= 2026 Sarawak state election =

General election for the 20th Sarawak State Legislative Assembly

- 12 December 2026

All 82 seats in the Legislative Assembly 42 seats needed for a majority
- Registered: 2,058,781
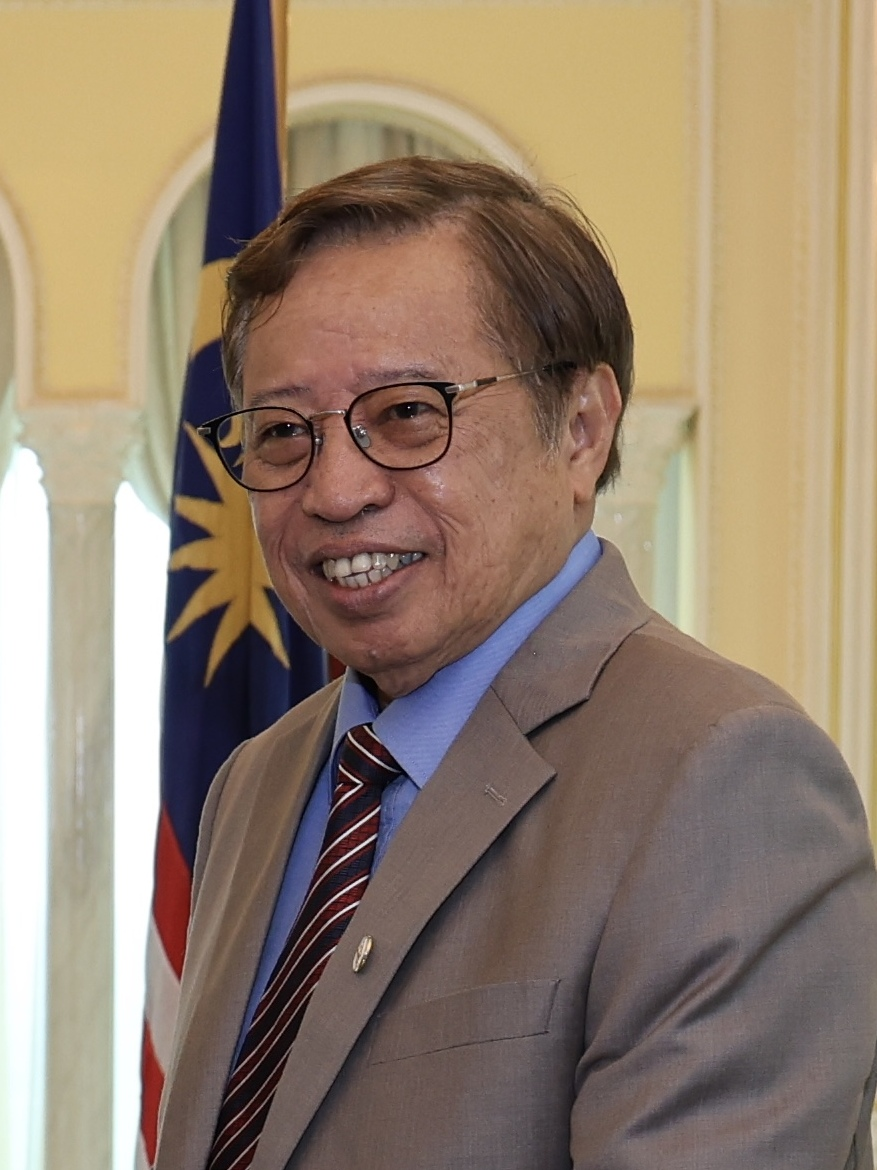

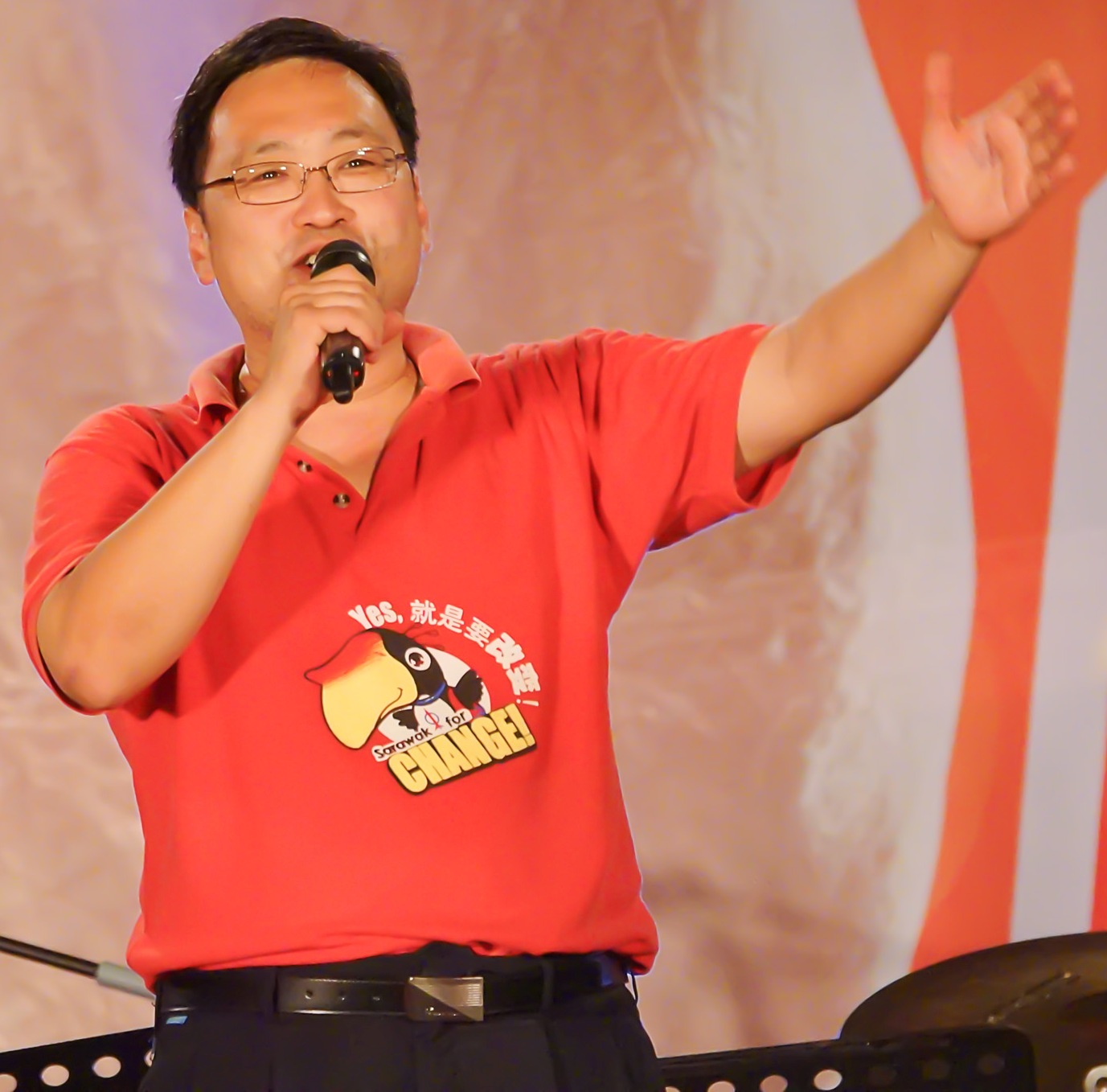
Leader	Abang Johari Tun Openg	Chong Chieng Jen
Party	PBB	DAP
Alliance	GPS	PH
Leader since	13 January 2017	10 June 2013
Leader's seat	Gedong	Kota Sentosa
Last election	76 seats	2 seats
Current seats	79	2
Seats needed	Steady	▲40
Incumbent Premier
Abang Johari
GPS-PBB

The 2026 Sarawak state election, formally the 13th Sarawak general election, will elect the 20th Sarawak State Legislative Assembly. It will be held on 12 December following the dissolution of the 19th Legislative Assembly on 26 October. A total of 82 seats will be up for election.

== Background ==
Due to the COVID-19 pandemic, the state election originally scheduled for 2021 was postponed following the implementation of the emergency proclamation. After the emergency was lifted, the state assembly was dissolved on 3 November 2021, with polling day being held on 18 December 2021. In the election, Gabungan Parti Sarawak won 76 out of 82 state assembly seats and formed the state government for the new term under the leadership of Abang Johari.

The new term of the state assembly began when members of the assembly were sworn in at the first sitting of the 19th Sarawak state assembly on 14 February 2022. The date marked the beginning of the five-year term of the state assembly as provided for in the state constitution. During this term, the state government continued to implement the Post-COVID-19 Development Strategy 2030, develop the green hydrogen sector, strengthen state-owned financial institutions and work related to the implementation and claim of Sarawak's rights under the Malaysia Agreement 1963.

In the election, Parti Sarawak Bersatu (PSB) contested in 70 of the 82 state assembly constituencies, the highest number of candidates among the opposition parties contesting. PSB won four seats, which saw it secure around 19% of the popular vote and became the largest opposition bloc in the assembly after the election. This overtook the federal-based opposition coalition that had previously had a larger representation in the assembly. PSB's position changed in August 2022 when Batu Lintang assemblyman, See Chee How, left the party and chose to run as an independent. The change reduced the number of PSB representatives in the Sarawak State Assembly to three seats. In 2024, PSB was officially dissolved after its dissolution application was approved by the Registrar of Societies in March 2024. In April of the same year, most of the former PSB leaders and members joined the Progressive Democratic Party, one of the component parties of Gabungan Parti Sarawak. This development led to a change in the political composition of the Sarawak State Assembly when several representatives who previously represented PSB joined the government bloc. After the changes, the opposition bloc in the Sarawak State Legislative Assembly consists mainly of the Democratic Action Party as well as several independent representatives.

Entering the mid-term, the state government approved a proposal to increase the number of state assembly seats from 82 to 99 as part of the constituency redelineation process. The proposal aims to take into account the changing population distribution and size of constituencies in several parts of Sarawak. However, the implementation of the new delineation is dependent on the completion of the process by the election commission, including public exhibition, preparation of the final report and approval by parliament. If the process is not completed before the dissolution of the assembly, the next state election is likely to be held using the existing configuration involving 82 seats.

As the last year of the legislative term approaches, political parties have begun to intensify their preparations for the election by organising conventions, political tours and organising grassroots machinery. During the same period, the implementation of automatic voter registration and the lowering of the voting age to 18 years (UNDI18) has increased the number of new voters in the state electoral roll. This has prompted political parties including Gabungan Parti Sarawak components such as Parti Pesaka Bumiputera Bersatu, Parti Rakyat Sarawak, Sarawak United People's Party and Progressive Democratic Party as well as opposition parties such as Democratic Action Party, Parti Keadilan Rakyat and several local parties to adjust their campaign approach by emphasising issues such as employment opportunities, higher education and economic development.

According to the state constitution, the maximum term of a state assembly is five years from the date of its first sitting. Therefore, the 19th Sarawak state legislative assembly will automatically dissolve on 14 February 2027 unless dissolved earlier by the governor on the advice of the premier. By mid-2026, several statements by government leaders and political developments had sparked speculation that the dissolution of the state legislature might occur before the end of its term.

== Electoral system ==
Elections in Malaysia are held at both the federal and state levels. The federal elections elect members of the Dewan Rakyat (lower house of parliament), while the state elections for each of the 13 states elect members of their respective state legislative assemblies. As Malaysia follows the Westminster system of government, the head of government (the Prime Minister at the federal level and the Menteri Besar/Chief Minister/Premier at the state level) is the individual who commands the confidence of the majority of the members of the legislative assembly, who is usually the leader of the party or coalition with the majority of seats.

The Sarawak state legislature is composed of Members of the State Legislative Assembly who are elected for a five-year term. As the redelineation process to expand the legislature to 99 seats has not yet been completed by the Election Commission, only 82 seats (which is the amount of seats prior to the 2025 amendment) are being contested. Each Member of the State Legislative Assembly is elected from a single constituency using a simple majority voting system (first-past-the-post). The party or coalition that obtains a majority of seats is entitled to form the state government. In the event of a hung parliament (no party obtains an absolute majority), the government can be formed through a new coalition or a confidence and supply agreement.

The voting age in Malaysia is 18 years. Through the full implementation of the Constitution (Amendment) Act 2019 which began on 15 December 2021, the automatic voter registration (AVR) system has been fully implemented. All citizens who have reached the age of 18 are registered as voters without having to apply manually. Elections are fully managed by the Election Commission of Malaysia. Malaysia does not practice a compulsory voting system.

== Constituencies ==
Electoral map of Sarawak, showing all 82 constituencies

== Composition before dissolution ==
GPS				PH	IND
79				2	1
47	13	11	8	2	1
PBB	SUPP	PRS	PDP	DAP	IND

== Timeline ==
The key dates are listed below:

Date	Event
26 October 2026	Dissolution of Sarawak State Legislative Assembly.
6 November 2026	Issue the Writ of Election.
28 November 2026	Nomination Day.
28 November–11 December 2026	Campaigning Period.
8–11 December 2026	Early Polling Days for Postal, Overseas and Advance Voters.
12 December 2026	Polling Day.

== Campaign slogans ==
Party	Slogan
Gabungan Parti Sarawak	
Parti Bansa Dayak Sarawak	
Pakatan Harapan	
Parti Bumi Kenyalang	

== Preparations ==
=== Political parties ===
In 2023, Abang Johari, the Sarawak Premier and chairman of the governing coalition GPS, announced that the coalition will contest all 82 seats in the next election.

Meanwhile, Democratic Action Party (DAP), has targeted up to 18 seats to contest in the next state election. DAP has been the sole opposition party in Sarawak Assembly, after Parti Sarawak Bersatu (PSB), the other opposition party, were dissolved and merged with Progressive Democratic Party, a component party of GPS in 2024.

PAS Sarawak has announced plans to contest at least eight state seats within the parliamentary constituencies of Betong, Batang Lupar, Bintulu, Sibuti, and Miri..

Additionally, local Sarawak-based parties, such as Wawasan Rakyat (PWR), have expressed their intention to participate in the upcoming election..

== Departing incumbents ==
The following members of the 19th Sarawak State Legislative Assembly did not seek re-election.

No.	State Constituency	Departing MLA	Coalition (Party)	Date confirmed	First elected	Reason
N15	Asajaya	Abdul Karim Rahman Hamzah	GPS (PBB)	2 August 2026	2001	Not seeking re-election
N25	Simunjan	Awla Dris	GPS (PBB)	15 November 2026	2016	Health issues
N45	Repok	Huang Tiong Sii	GPS (SUPP)		2016	Dropped by party (MP for Sarikei)

=== Incumbents contested in different constituency ===
MLA	Coalition (Party)	State Constituency		First elected
MLA	Coalition (Party)	Formerly	Current	First elected
Chong Chieng Jen	PH (DAP)	N09 Padungan	N12 Kota Sentosa	2006

== Candidates ==
Candidate announcements are expected closer to nomination day.

No.	Parliamentary constituency	No.	State Constituency	Number of Voters	Constituency Largest Ethnic	Incumbent Member	Incumbent Coalition (Party)	Political coalitions and respective candidates and coalitions																					
No.	Parliamentary constituency	No.	State Constituency	Number of Voters	Constituency Largest Ethnic	Incumbent Member	Incumbent Coalition (Party)	Gabungan Parti Sarawak (GPS)		Parti Bansa Dayak Sarawak Baru (PBDS)		Pakatan Harapan (PH)		Parti Bumi Kenyalang (PBK)		Parti Wawasan Rakyat (PWR)		BERSAMA - ASPIRASI Alliance		Others									
No.	Parliamentary constituency	No.	State Constituency	Number of Voters	Constituency Largest Ethnic	Incumbent Member	Incumbent Coalition (Party)	Candidate name	Party	Candidate name	Party	Candidate name	Party	Candidate name	Party	Candidate name	Party	Candidate name	Party	Candidate name	Party	Candidate name	Party	Candidate name	Party	Candidate name	Party	Candidate name	Party
P192	Mas Gading	N01	Opar		Bidayuh	Billy Sujang	GPS (SUPP)		SUPP	Bayang Teron	PBDS	Lim Nee Kon	DAP		PBK				ASPIRASI										
P192	Mas Gading	N02	Tasik Biru		Bidayuh	Henry Harry Jinep	GPS (PDP)	Henry Harry Jinep	PDP	Daniel Jani	PBDS	Not Contested			PBK			Buln Patrick Ribos	ASPIRASI										
P193	Santubong	N03	Tanjong Datu		Malay	Azizul Annuar Adenan	GPS (PBB)	Azizul Annuar Adenan	PBB			Not Contested				Muhamad Musyirin Hendri	PWR												
P193	Santubong	N04	Pantai Damai		Malay	Abdul Rahman Junaidi	GPS (PBB)		PBB			Not Contested			PBK	Affendi Jeman	PWR												
P193	Santubong	N05	Demak Laut		Malay	Hazland Abang Hipni	GPS (PBB)	Abang Johari Tun Openg	PBB			Not Contested				Yakup Khalid	PWR												
P194	Petra Jaya	N06	Tupong	56,019	Malay	Fazzrudin Abdul Rahman	GPS (PBB)	Fazzrudin Abdul Rahman	PBB			Not Contested																	
P194	Petra Jaya	N07	Samariang		Malay	Sharifah Hasidah Sayeed Aman Ghazali	GPS (PBB)		PBB			Not Contested				Hussain Zainudin	PWR											Jais Sahok	IND
P194	Petra Jaya	N08	Satok		Malay	Ibrahim Baki	GPS (PBB)	Ibrahim Baki	PBB			Not Contested			PBK														
P195	Bandar Kuching	N09	Padungan		Chinese	Chong Chieng Jen	PH (DAP)	Nicholas Wung Duk Ying	SUPP			Michael Kong Feng Nian	DAP	Tiong Ing Neng	PBK	Mahmud Sabli	PWR											Kushairi Abang	IND
P195	Bandar Kuching	N10	Pending	38,029	Chinese	Violet Yong Wui Wui	PH (DAP)	Kho Teck Wan	SUPP		PBDS	Violet Yong Wui Wui	DAP	Chiang Chen Kiat	PBK				ASPIRASI										
P195	Bandar Kuching	N11	Batu Lintang	47,315	Chinese	See Chee How	IND	Sih Hua Tong	SUPP			Kelvin Yii Lee Wuen	DAP	Voon Lee Shan	PBK				ASPIRASI										
P196	Stampin	N12	Kota Sentosa	48,460	Chinese	Wilfred Yap Yau Sin	GPS (SUPP)	Wilfred Yap Yau Sin	SUPP		PBDS	Chong Chieng Jen	DAP	Lue Cheng Hing	PBK													Tan Kun Gee	IND
P196	Stampin	N13	Batu Kitang	39,721	Chinese	Lo Khere Chiang	GPS (SUPP)	Lo Khere Chiang	SUPP		PBDS	Jordan Soo Tian Ren	DAP		PBK														
P196	Stampin	N14	Batu Kawah		Chinese	Sim Kui Hian	GPS (SUPP)	Sim Kui Hian	SUPP			Sim Kiat Leng	DAP		PBK	Mohamad Zulkarnaen Yusuf	PWR											Lee Chin Teck	IND
P197	Kota Samarahan	N15	Asajaya		Malay	Abdul Karim Rahman Hamzah	GPS (PBB)		PBB			Not Contested																	
P197	Kota Samarahan	N16	Muara Tuang		Malay	Idris Buang	GPS (PBB)		PBB		PBDS	Not Contested				Masmanis Mohamed Yusof	PWR			Niel Raffael	ASPINAS							Peter John Jaban	IND
P197	Kota Samarahan	N17	Stakan		Malay	Hamzah Brahim	GPS (PBB)	Hamzah Brahim	PBB	Kipli Ayom	PBDS	Not Contested		Atet Dego	PBK														
P198	Puncak Borneo	N18	Serembu		Bidayuh	Miro Simuh	GPS (PBB)	Iana Akam	PDP	Bego Sepop	PBDS	Not Contested																	
P198	Puncak Borneo	N19	Mambong		Bidayuh	Jerip Susil	GPS (PBB)		PDP	Sanjan Daik	PBDS	Not Contested		Rangen Jamang	PBK						ASPINAS			Diog Dios	PBM				
P198	Puncak Borneo	N20	Tarat		Bidayuh	Roland Sagah Wee Inn	GPS (PBB)		PDP	Lebanon Ero	PBDS	Not Contested																Dato Peter Minos	IND
P199	Serian	N21	Tebedu		Bidayuh	Simon Sinang Bada	GPS (PBB)		PBB			Not Contested							ASPIRASI										
P199	Serian	N22	Kedup		Bidayuh	Martin Ben	GPS (PBB)	Martin Ben	PBB	Dacky Daoh	PBDS	Not Contested		Stephen Sungan	PBK				ASPIRASI										
P199	Serian	N23	Bukit Semuja		Bidayuh	John Ilus	GPS (PBB)		PBB	Thomas Phillip Moss	PBDS	Not Contested		Anselm Diye	PBK														
P200	Batang Sadong	N24	Sadong Jaya	10,970	Malay	Aidel Lariwoo	GPS (PBB)		PBB			Not Contested																	
P200	Batang Sadong	N25	Simunjan	12,802	Malay	Awla Dris	GPS (PBB)	Sharbini Suhaili	PBB			Not Contested																	
P200	Batang Sadong	N26	Gedong	10,574	Malay	Abang Johari Tun Openg	GPS (PBB)	Hazland Abang Hipni	PBB			Not Contested		Saharuddin Abdullah	PBK														
P201	Batang Lupar	N27	Sebuyau		Malay	Julaihi Narawi	GPS (PBB)		PBB			Not Contested																	
P201	Batang Lupar	N28	Lingga		Malay	Dayang Noorazah Awang Sohor	GPS (PBB)		PBB			Not Contested			PBK														
P201	Batang Lupar	N29	Beting Maro		Malay	Razaili Gapor	GPS (PBB)		PBB			Not Contested																	
P202	Sri Aman	N30	Balai Ringin		Iban	Snowdan Lawan	GPS (PRS)		PBB	Lee Ramsay Richard Will	PBDS	Not Contested			PBK							Pok Ungkut	TERAS						
P202	Sri Aman	N31	Bukit Begunan		Iban	Mong Dagang	GPS (PRS)	Mohd Melintang Abdullah	PRS		PBDS	Not Contested			PBK														
P202	Sri Aman	N32	Simanggang		Iban	Francis Harden Hollis	GPS (SUPP)	Wilson Entebang	PDP			Not Contested			PBK													Daeloniel McDelon Bong	IND
P203	Lubok Antu	N33	Engkilili		Iban	Johnical Rayong Ngipa	GPS (PDP)	Johnical Rayong Ngipa	PDP			Not Contested			PBK														
P203	Lubok Antu	N34	Batang Ai		Iban	Malcom Mussen Lamoh	GPS (PRS)		PRS		PBDS	Not Contested			PBK			Hugh Lawrence Zehnder	ASPIRASI										
P204	Betong	N35	Saribas	17,382	Malay	Ricky @ Mohamad Razi Sitam	GPS (PBB)		PBB			Not Contested				Jenau Masing	PWR		BERSAMA										
P204	Betong	N36	Layar		Iban	Gerald Rentap Jabu	GPS (PBB)		PBB	Kembi Rigong	PBDS	Not Contested			PBK				ASPIRASI										
P204	Betong	N37	Bukit Saban		Iban	Douglas Uggah Embas	GPS (PBB)		PBB	Ambun Nyanggah	PBDS	Not Contested			PBK													Andrewson Ngalai	IND
P205	Saratok	N38	Kalaka	12,534	Malay	Mohamad Duri	GPS (PBB)		PBB	Muhammad Syafiq Thomas Abdullah	PBDS	Not Contested				Abdul Halim Abdullah	PWR												
P205	Saratok	N39	Krian		Iban	Friday Belik	GPS (PDP)		PDP	John Antau Linggang	PBDS	Not Contested						Jane Dripin	ASPIRASI										
P205	Saratok	N40	Kabong		Malay	Mohd Chee Kadir	GPS (PBB)		PBB			Not Contested		Not Contested															
P206	Tanjong Manis	N41	Kuala Rajang		Melanau	Len Talif Salleh	GPS (PBB)		PBB			Not Contested		Not Contested															
P206	Tanjong Manis	N42	Semop		Melanau	Abdullah Saidol	GPS (PBB)		PBB			Not Contested		Not Contested				Abdul Raafidin Majidi	BERSAMA										
P207	Igan	N43	Daro		Melanau	Safiee Ahmad	GPS (PBB)		PBB			Not Contested		Not Contested					BERSAMA										
P207	Igan	N44	Jemoreng		Melanau	Juanda Jaya	GPS (PBB)		PBB			Not Contested		Not Contested															
P208	Sarikei	N45	Repok		Chinese	Huang Tiong Sii	GPS (SUPP)		SUPP				DAP		PBK				ASPIRASI										
P208	Sarikei	N46	Meradong		Chinese	Ding Kuong Hiing	GPS (SUPP)	Ding Kuong Hiing	SUPP				DAP		PBK				ASPIRASI										
P209	Julau	N47	Pakan		Iban	William Mawan Ikom	GPS (PBB)	Sagu Unting	PBB			Not Contested			PBK									Larry Sng	PBM			Edwin Bandang	IND
P209	Julau	N48	Meluan		Iban	Rolland Duat Jubin	GPS (PDP)		PDP			Not Contested			PBK										PBM				
P210	Kanowit	N49	Ngemah		Iban	Anyi Jana	GPS (PRS)	Alexander Donald	PRS	Tedwin Beti	PBDS	Not Contested			PBK				ASPIRASI										
P210	Kanowit	N50	Machan		Iban	Allan Siden Gramong	GPS (PBB)		PBB	Satia Brain	PBDS	Not Contested			PBK				BERSAMA										
P211	Lanang	N51	Bukit Assek		Chinese	Chieng Jin Ek	GPS (SUPP)		SUPP			Stanley Chiew Sung Ngie	DAP		PBK	Fadhil Mohamad Isa @ Cardock	PWR												
P211	Lanang	N52	Dudong	56,555	Chinese	Tiong King Sing	GPS (PDP)		PDP			Not Contested		Priscilla Lau	PBK														
P212	Sibu	N53	Bawang Assan		Chinese	Wong Soon Koh	GPS (PDP)	Joshua Ting Fu Ying	PDP			Not Contested			PBK														
P212	Sibu	N54	Pelawan	52,601	Chinese	Michael Tiang Ming Tee	GPS (SUPP)	Michael Tiang Ming Tee	SUPP			Irene Wong Lee Ting	DAP		PBK														
P212	Sibu	N55	Nangka		Malay	Annuar Rapaee	GPS (PBB)	Annuar Rapaee	PBB			Not Contested																Datu Haji Mual Haji Suaud	IND
P213	Mukah	N56	Dalat		Melanau	Fatimah Abdullah	GPS (PBB)		PBB			Not Contested																	
P213	Mukah	N57	Tellian		Melanau	Royston Valentine	GPS (PBB)		PBB			Not Contested			PBK														
P213	Mukah	N58	Balingian		Melanau	Abdul Yakub Arbi	GPS (PBB)		PBB			Not Contested																Yussibnosh Balo	IND
P214	Selangau	N59	Tamin		Iban	Christopher Gira Sambang	GPS (PRS)	Christopher Gira Sambang	PRS		PBDS		PKR		PBK														
P214	Selangau	N60	Kakus		Iban	John Sikie Tayai	GPS (PRS)	John Sikie Tayai	PRS		PBDS		PKR		PBK														
P215	Kapit	N61	Pelagus	12,301	Iban	Wilson Nyabong Ijang	GPS (PRS)		PRS		PBDS	Not Contested			PBK														
P215	Kapit	N62	Katibas		Iban	Lidam Assan	GPS (PBB)		PBB			Not Contested			PBK				ASPIRASI										
P215	Kapit	N63	Bukit Goram		Iban	Jefferson Jamit Unyat	GPS (PBB)		PBB			Not Contested			PBK				ASPIRASI										
P216	Hulu Rajang	N64	Baleh		Iban	Nicholas Kudi Jantai Masing	GPS (PRS)		PBB		PBDS	Not Contested			PBK														
P216	Hulu Rajang	N65	Belaga	12,993	Kenyah	Liwan Lagang	GPS (PRS)		PRS			Not Contested																	
P216	Hulu Rajang	N66	Murum		Kenyah	Kennedy Chukpai Ugon	GPS (PRS)		PRS				PKR																
P217	Bintulu	N67	Jepak		Melanau	Iskandar Turkee	GPS (PBB)		PBB			Not Contested																	
P217	Bintulu	N68	Tanjong Batu		Chinese	Johnny Pang Leong Ming	GPS (SUPP)	Johnny Pang Leong Ming	SUPP				DAP		PBK														
P217	Bintulu	N69	Kemena		Iban	Stephen Rundi Utom	GPS (PBB)	Stephen Rundi Utom	PBB	John Brian Anthony	PBDS	Not Contested			PBK														
P217	Bintulu	N70	Samalaju		Iban	Majang Renggi	GPS (PRS)		PRS	Baba Emperan	PBDS	Not Contested			PBK														
P218	Sibuti	N71	Bekenu		Iban	Rosey Yunus	GPS (PBB)		PBB		PBDS	Not Contested							BERSAMA										
P218	Sibuti	N72	Lambir		Iban	Ripin Lamat	GPS (PBB)		PBB		PBDS	Not Contested							BERSAMA										
P219	Miri	N73	Piasau		Chinese	Sebastian Ting Chiew Yew	GPS (SUPP)		SUPP			Chiew Choon Man	PKR		PBK				ASPIRASI									Romuald Siew	IND
P219	Miri	N74	Pujut		Chinese	Adam Yii Siew Sang	GPS (SUPP)	Adam Yii Siew Sang	SUPP			Voon Kai Foo	DAP	Leslie Ting Siong Ngiap	PBK				ASPIRASI										
P219	Miri	N75	Senadin	75,641	Chinese	Lee Kim Shin	GPS (SUPP)		SUPP				PKR															Tibin Sidu	IND
P220	Baram	N76	Marudi		Iban	Penguang Manggil	GPS (PDP)		PDP			Not Contested			PBK														
P220	Baram	N77	Telang Usan		Kenyah	Dennis Ngau	GPS (PBB)		PBB		PBDS	Not Contested							ASPIRASI									Datu Ose Murang	IND
P220	Baram	N78	Mulu		Kelabit	Gerawat Gala	GPS (PBB)		PBB			Not Contested							ASPIRASI										
P221	Limbang	N79	Bukit Kota		Malay	Abdul Rahman Ismail	GPS (PBB)		PBB			Not Contested			PBK														
P221	Limbang	N80	Batu Danau		Iban	Paulus Palu Gumbang	GPS (PBB)		PBB			Not Contested			PBK														
P222	Lawas	N81	Ba'kelalan		Lun Bawang	Baru Bian	GPS (PDP)		PDP	Peter Asut	PBDS	Not Contested																	
P222	Lawas	N82	Bukit Sari		Malay	Awang Tengah Ali Hasan	GPS (PBB)		PBB			Not Contested			PBK														
