= Kabong =

State constituency in Sarawak, Malaysia

Kabong (N40)
Sarawak constituency

State constituency
- Legislature: Sarawak State Legislative Assembly
MLA
Vacant
- Constituency created: 2015
- First contested: 2016
- Last contested: 2026

Kabong is a state constituency in Sarawak, Malaysia, that has been represented in the Sarawak State Legislative Assembly since 2016.

The state constituency was created in the 2015 redistribution and is mandated to return a single member to the Sarawak State Legislative Assembly under the first past the post voting system.

== Demographics ==
Ethnic breakdown of Kabong's electorate as of 2022
1. Malay-Muslim bumiputera (65.7%)
2. Sarawak bumiputera (27.9%)
3. Chinese (5.90%)
4. Other ethnicities (0.50%)

== History ==
As of 2020, Kabong has a population of 13,087 people.

=== Polling districts ===
According to the gazette issued on 31 October 2022, the Kabong constituency has a total of 3 polling districts.

State constituency	Polling Districts	Code	Location
Kabong (N40)	Nyabor	205/40/01	SK Haji Junid Gerigat; SK Kpg. Alit Kabong; SK Engkabang Kabong; SK St. Michael Plassu; SK Sg. Pasir; SK To'Emam Nyabor; SK Empelam; SK Abang Moh Sesang
Kabong (N40)	Roban	205/40/02	SK Ulu Roban; SK St. Paul's Roban; SJK (C) Chung Hua Roban
Kabong (N40)	Kabong	205/40/03	SJK (C) Chung Hua Kabong; SK Abang Leman Kabong

=== Representation history ===
Members of the Legislative Assembly for Kabong
Assembly	No	Years	Member	Party
Constituency created from Krian and Kalaka
18th	N40	2016-2018	Mohd Chee Kadir	BN (PBB)
18th	N40	2018-2021	Mohd Chee Kadir	GPS (PBB)
19th	N40	2021–2026	Mohd Chee Kadir	GPS (PBB)

== Election results ==
Sarawak state election, 2026: Kabong
Party	Candidate	Votes	%	∆%
GPS				▲
PH				▲
Total valid votes				
Total rejected ballots				
Unreturned ballots				
Turnout				
Registered electors				
Majority				

Sarawak state election, 2021: Kabong
Party	Candidate	Votes	%	∆%
GPS	Mohd Chee Kadir	4,789	67.32	▲67.32
PSB	Wan Mohamad Madehi Wan Ali	2,026	28.48	▲28.48
PBK	Mohd Asri Kasim	208	2.92	▲2.92
Amanah	Hud Andri Zulkarnain	91	1.28	▼21.37
Total valid votes		7,114	100.00	
Total rejected ballots		82		
Unreturned ballots		38		
Turnout		7,234	71.55	▼0.68
Registered electors		10,111		
Majority		2,763	38.84	▼15.87
GPS gain from BN		Swing		?
Source(s) https://lom.agc.gov.my/ilims/upload/portal/akta/outputp/1718688/PUB687.pdf

Sarawak state election, 2016: Kabong
Party	Candidate	Votes	%
BN	Mohd Chee Kadir	5,069	77.35
Amanah	Jini Sahini	1,484	22.65
Total valid votes		6,553	100.00
Total rejected ballots		121	
Unreturned ballots		34	
Turnout		6,708	72.23
Registered electors		9,287	
Majority		3,585	54.71
This is a new seat contested.
Source(s) "Federal Government Gazette - Notice of Contested Election, State Legislative Assembly of the State of Sarawak [P.U. (B) 190/2016]" (PDF). Attorney General's Chambers of Malaysia. 25 April 2016. Archived from the original (PDF) on 2017-06-12. "Senarai Calon yang Disahkan Layak Bertanding Pilihan Raya Dewan Undangan Negeri ke-11". Election Commission of Malaysia. 25 April 2016. Archived from the original on 25 April 2016.
