= Tellian =

Electoral district in Sarawak, Malaysia

Tellian (N57)
Sarawak constituency

State constituency
- Legislature: Sarawak State Legislative Assembly
MLA
Vacant
- Constituency created: 2015
- First contested: 2016
- Last contested: 2026

Tellian is a state constituency in Sarawak, Malaysia, that has been represented in the Sarawak State Legislative Assembly since 2016.

The state constituency was created in the 2015 redistribution and is mandated to return a single member to the Sarawak State Legislative Assembly under the first past the post voting system.

== Demographics ==
Ethnic breakdown of Tellian's electorate as of 2022
1. Malay-Muslim bumiputera (54.8%)
2. Sarawak bumiputera (30.9%)
3. Chinese (13.4%)
4. Other ethnicities (0.90%)

== History ==
As of 2020, Tellian has a population of 16,729 people.

=== Polling districts ===
According to the gazette issued on 31 October 2022, the Tellian constituency has a total of 15 polling districts.

| State constituency | Polling Districts | Code | Location |
|---|---|---|---|
| Tellian (N57) | Baoh | 213/57/01 | SK St. Luke Ng. Baoh Dalat |
| Tellian (N57) | Penat | 213/57/02 | Balai Raya Kpg. Penat |
| Tellian (N57) | Sebakong | 213/57/03 | RH Mawar Tanjong Pedada Mukah; RH Richard Kilat Madang |
| Tellian (N57) | Ulu Baoh | 213/57/04 | SK Ulu Baoh Dalat |
| Tellian (N57) | Dijih | 213/57/05 | SK Dijih Mukah; SK Lubok Bemban Mukah |
| Tellian (N57) | Ulu Sikat | 213/57/06 | SK Ladang 3 |
| Tellian (N57) | Nangka Sikat | 213/57/07 | SK Ng. Sikat Mukah |
| Tellian (N57) | Engkerbai | 213/57/08 | SK Bukit Inkerbai Mukah |
| Tellian (N57) | Petanak Mukah | 213/57/09 | SRA (MIS) Mukah |
| Tellian (N57) | Tellian | 213/57/10 | SK Kpg. Tellian |
| Tellian (N57) | Judan | 213/57/11 | SK Dua Sg. Mukah |
| Tellian (N57) | Kuala Lama | 213/57/12 | SK St. Patrick Mukah |
| Tellian (N57) | Tellian Laut | 213/57/13 | Blok Lama SK Datuk Awang Udin |
| Tellian (N57) | Mukah | 213/57/14 | SJK (C) Chong Boon |
| Tellian (N57) | Penakop Permai | 213/57/15 | Makmal SK Datuk Awang Udin |

=== Representation history ===
Members of the Legislative Assembly for Tellian
| Assembly | No | Years | Member | Party |
Constituency created from Balingian, Dalat and Tamin
| 18th | N57 | 2016–2018 | Yussibnosh Balo | BN (PBB) |
| 18th | N57 | 2018–2021 | Yussibnosh Balo | GPS (PBB) |
| 19th | N57 | 2021–2026 | Royston Valentine | GPS (PBB) |

== Election results ==
Sarawak state election, 2026: Tellian
| Party | Candidate | Votes | % | ∆% |
|---|---|---|---|---|
| GPS | | | | ▲ |
| PH | | | | ▲ |
| Total valid votes | | | | |
| Total rejected ballots | | | | |
| Unreturned ballots | | | | |
| Turnout | | | | |
| Registered electors | | | | |
| Majority | | | | |

Sarawak state election, 2021: Tellian
| Party | Candidate | Votes | % | ∆% |
|---|---|---|---|---|
| GPS | Royston Valentine | 4,282 | 70.10 | ▲70.10 |
| PSB | Sait Junaidi | 1,365 | 22.35 | ▲22.35 |
| PKR | Mohd Arwin Abdullah | 287 | 4.70 | ▼6.88 |
| PBK | Zainuddin Budug | 174 | 2.85 | ▲2.85 |
| Total valid votes | | 6,108 | 100.00 | |
| Total rejected ballots | | 79 | | |
| Unreturned ballots | | 18 | | |
| Turnout | | 6,205 | 61.69 | ▼4.03 |
| Registered electors | | 10,059 | | |
| Majority | | 2,917 | 47.76 | ▲47.76 |
| GPS gain from BN | | Swing | | ? |
Source(s) https://lom.agc.gov.my/ilims/upload/portal/akta/outputp/1718688/PUB687.pdf

Sarawak state election, 2016: Tellian
| Party | Candidate | Votes | % |
|---|---|---|---|
| BN | Yussibnosh Balo | 5,087 | 88.42 |
| PKR | Asini @ Hasni Yahya | 666 | 11.58 |
| Total valid votes | | 5,753 | 100.00 |
| Total rejected ballots | | 83 | |
| Unreturned ballots | | 22 | |
| Turnout | | 5,858 | 65.72 |
| Registered electors | | 8,914 | |
| Majority | | 4,421 | 76.84 |
This was a new constituency created.
