= Bukit Semuja =

State constituency in Sarawak, Malaysia

Bukit Semuja (N23)
Sarawak constituency

State constituency
- Legislature: Sarawak State Legislative Assembly
MLA
Vacant
- Constituency created: 2015
- First contested: 2016
- Last contested: 2026

Bukit Semuja is a state constituency in Sarawak, Malaysia, that has been represented in the Sarawak State Legislative Assembly since 2016.

The state constituency was created in the 2015 redistribution and is mandated to return a single member to the Sarawak State Legislative Assembly under the first past the post voting system.

== Demographics ==
Ethnic breakdown of Bukit Semuja's electorate as of 2022
1. Sarawak bumiputera (62.2%)
2. Chinese (19.1%)
3. Malay-Muslim bumiputera (17.9%)
4. Other ethnicities (0.80%)

== History ==
=== Polling districts ===
According to the gazette issued on 31 October 2022, the Bukit Semuja constituency has a total of 6 polling districts.

State constituency	Polling Districts	Code	Location
Bukit Semuja (N23)	Sedihan	199/23/01	Balai Raya Kpg. Tebakang Dayak; SK Tebakang; Balai Raya Sorah Dayak; SK Pangkalan Sorah; SK koran
Bukit Semuja (N23)	Triboh	199/23/02	SK Merakai; Balai Raya Kpg. Kuala; SK Lebor Remun; SK Bedup; SK Melansai; SK Pengkalan Bedup
Bukit Semuja (N23)	Selabi	199/23/03	SK Riih Daso; Balai Raya Kpg. Riih Mawang; SK St. Patrick Tangga; Balai Raya Kpg. Rasau; SK St. Henry Selabi; Balai Raya Kpg. Seroban; SK Serian
Bukit Semuja (N23)	Pasar Serian	199/23/04	SJK (C) Chung Hua Serian
Bukit Semuja (N23)	Kakai	199/23/05	Balai Raya Kpg. Kakai
Bukit Semuja (N23)	Serian Hulu	199/23/06	Stadium Bola Keranjang Tertutup (Majlis Daerah Serian)

=== Representation history ===
Members of the Legislative Assembly for Bukit Semuja
Assembly	No	Years	Member	Party
Constituency created from Kedup, Tarat and Tebedu
18th	N23	2016-2018	John Ilus	BN (PBB)
18th	N23	2018-2021	John Ilus	GPS (PBB)
19th	N23	2021–2026	John Ilus	GPS (PBB)

== Election results ==
Sarawak state election, 2026: Bukit Semuja
Party	Candidate	Votes	%	∆%
GPS				▲
PH				▲
PBK	Anselm Diye			▲
Total valid votes				
Total rejected ballots				
Unreturned ballots				
Turnout				
Registered electors				
Majority				

Sarawak state election, 2021: Bukit Semuja
Party	Candidate	Votes	%	∆%
GPS	John Ilus	6,113	70.06	▲70.06
PSB	Elsiy Tingang	1,408	16.14	▲16.14
DAP	Brolin Nicholsion	777	8.91	▼16.33
PBK	Edward Andrew Luwak @ Edward Luwak	427	4.89	▲4.89
Total valid votes		8,725	100.00	
Total rejected ballots		153		
Unreturned ballots		45		
Turnout		8,923	59.91	▼10.81
Registered electors		14,893		
Majority		4,705	53.92	▲19.53
GPS gain from BN		Swing		?
Source(s) https://lom.agc.gov.my/ilims/upload/portal/akta/outputp/1718688/PUB687.pdf

Sarawak state election, 2016: Bukit Semuja
Party	Candidate	Votes	%
BN	John Ilus	5,451	59.64
DAP	Edward Andrew Luwak @ Edward Luwak	2,307	25.24
Independent	Frederick Bayoi Manggie	1,196	13.09
PBDS Baru	Cobbold Lusoi	133	1.46
STAR	Johnny Bob Aput	53	0.58
Total valid votes		9,140	100.00
Total rejected ballots		117	
Unreturned ballots		195	
Turnout		9,452	70.72
Registered electors		13,365	
Majority		3,144	34.40
This was a new constituency created.
Source(s) "Federal Government Gazette - Notice of Contested Election, State Legislative Assembly of the State of Sarawak [P.U. (B) 190/2016]" (PDF). Attorney General's Chambers of Malaysia. 25 April 2016. Archived from the original (PDF) on 12 June 2017. "Senarai Calon yang Disahkan Layak Bertanding Pilihan Raya Dewan Undangan Negeri ke-11". Election Commission of Malaysia. 25 April 2016. Archived from the original on 25 April 2016.
