= Kota Sentosa =

State constituency in Sarawak, Malaysia

Kota Sentosa (N12)
Sarawak constituency

State constituency
- Legislature: Sarawak State Legislative Assembly
MLA
Vacant
- Constituency created: 2005
- First contested: 2006
- Last contested: 2026

Kota Sentosa is a state constituency in Sarawak, Malaysia, that has been represented in the Sarawak State Legislative Assembly since 2006.

The state constituency was created in the 2005 redistribution and is mandated to return a single member to the Sarawak State Legislative Assembly under the first past the post voting system.

== Demographics ==
Ethnic breakdown of Kota Sentosa's electorate as of 2022
1. Chinese (73.0%)
2. Sarawak bumiputera (16.2%)
3. Malay-Muslim bumiputera (9.70%)
4. Other ethnicities (1.10%)

== History ==
As of 2020, Kota Sentosa has a population of 66,413 people.

=== Polling districts ===
According to the gazette issued on 31 October 2022, the Kota Sentosa constituency has a total of 6 polling districts.

State constituency	Polling Districts	Code	Location
Kota Sentosa (N12)	Stampin	196/12/01	Balai Raya Kpg. Stampin; SJK (C) Chung Hua No. 2
Kota Sentosa (N12)	Seledah	196/12/02	SJK (C) Stampin
Kota Sentosa (N12)	Satria Jaya	196/12/03	SK Satria Jaya; SK Sg. Stutong
Kota Sentosa (N12)	Batu Tujoh	196/12/04	SJK (C) Sam Hap Hin; SK St. Alban; SJK (C) Chung Hua Stampin (Sg. Tapang)
Kota Sentosa (N12)	Hui Sing	196/12/05	SMK Datuk Patinggi Haji Abdul Ghapor Stampin
Kota Sentosa (N12)	Batu Empat	196/12/06	SJK (C) Chung Hu Batu 4 ½

=== Representation history ===
Members of the Legislative Assembly for Kota Sentosa
Assembly	No	Years	Member	Party
Constituency created from Batu Lintang and Batu Kawah
16th	N12	2006-2011	Chong Chieng Jen (張健仁)	PR (DAP)
17th	N12	2011-2016	Chong Chieng Jen (張健仁)	PR (DAP)
18th	N12	2016-2021	Chong Chieng Jen (張健仁)	PH (DAP)
19th	N12	2021–2026	Wilfred Yap Yau Sin (葉燿星)	GPS (SUPP)

== Election results ==
Sarawak state election, 2026: Kota Sentosa
Party	Candidate	Votes	%	∆%
PBK	Lue Cheng Hing			▲
GPS				▲
DAP	Chong Chieng Jen			▲
Total valid votes				
Total rejected ballots				
Unreturned ballots				
Turnout				
Registered electors				
Majority				

Sarawak state election, 2021: Kota Sentosa
Party	Candidate	Votes	%	∆%
GPS	Wilfred Yap Yau Sin	5,806	43.05	▲43.05
DAP	Michael Kong Feng Nian	4,123	30.57	▼27.59
PSB	Lau Pang Heng	2,328	17.26	▲17.26
PBK	Lue Cheng Hing	1,015	7.53	▲7.53
ASPIRASI	Tan Kok Chiang	215	1.59	▲1.59
Total valid votes		13,487	100.00	
Total rejected ballots		139		
Unreturned ballots		72		
Turnout		13,698	48.25	▼19.66
Registered electors		28,392		
Majority		1,683	12.48	▼3.84
GPS gain from DAP		Swing		?
Source(s) https://lom.agc.gov.my/ilims/upload/portal/akta/outputp/1718688/PUB687.pdf

Sarawak state election, 2016: Kota Sentosa
Party	Candidate	Votes	%	∆%
DAP	Chong Chieng Jen	10,047	58.16	▼3.68
BN	Wilfred Yap Yau Sin	7,228	41.84	▲3.68
Total valid votes		17,275	100.00	
Total rejected ballots		196		
Unreturned ballots		24		
Turnout		17,495	67.91	▼7.50
Registered electors		25,761		
Majority		2,819	16.32	▼7.36
DAP hold		Swing		
Source(s) "Federal Government Gazette - Notice of Contested Election, State Legislative Assembly of the State of Sarawak [P.U. (B) 190/2016]" (PDF). Attorney General's Chambers of Malaysia. 25 April 2016. Archived from the original (PDF) on 2017-06-12. "Senarai Calon yang Disahkan Layak Bertanding Pilihan Raya Dewan Undangan Negeri ke-11". Election Commission of Malaysia. 25 April 2016. Archived from the original on 25 April 2016.

Sarawak state election, 2011: Kota Sentosa
Party	Candidate	Votes	%	∆%
DAP	Chong Chieng Jen	12,594	61.84	▲9.74
BN	Yap Chin Loi	7,770	38.16	▼9.74
Total valid votes		20,364	100.00	
Total rejected ballots		195		
Unreturned ballots		30		
Turnout		20,589	75.41	▲7.57
Registered electors		27,301		
Majority		4,824	23.69	▲19.48
DAP hold		Swing		
Source(s) "Federal Government Gazette - Results of Contested Election and Statements of the Poll after the Official Addition of Votes Sarawak [P.U. (B) 245/2011]" (PDF). Attorney General's Chambers of Malaysia. 29 April 2011.

Sarawak state election, 2006: Kota Sentosa
Party	Candidate	Votes	%
DAP	Chong Chieng Jen	6,579	52.10
BN	Yap Chin Loi	6,048	47.90
Total valid votes		12,627	100.00
Total rejected ballots		115	
Unreturned ballots		104	
Turnout		12,846	67.84
Registered electors		18,934	
Majority		531	4.21
This was a new constituency created.
