= Simunjan (state constituency) =

State constituency in Sarawak, Malaysia

Simunjan (N25)
Sarawak constituency

State constituency
- Legislature: Sarawak State Legislative Assembly
MLA
Vacant
- Constituency created: 1987
- First contested: 1991
- Last contested: 2026

Simunjan is a state constituency in Sarawak, Malaysia, that has been represented in the Sarawak State Legislative Assembly since 1991.

The state constituency was created in the 1987 redistribution and is mandated to return a single member to the Sarawak State Legislative Assembly under the first past the post voting system.

== Demographics ==
Ethnic breakdown of Simunjan's electorate as of 2022
1. Malay-Muslim bumiputera (63.8%)
2. Sarawak bumiputera (29.3%)
3. Chinese (6.40%)
4. Other ethnicities (0.50%)

== History ==
As of 2020, Simunjan has a population of 12,293 people.

=== Polling districts ===
According to the gazette issued on 31 October 2022, the Simunjan constituency has a total of 14 polling districts.

State constituency	Polling Districts	Code	Location
Simunjan (N25)	Rangkang	200/25/01	Dewan Kpg. Rangkang
Simunjan (N25)	Putin	200/25/02	SK Haji Bujang Rangawan Putin
Simunjan (N25)	Rangawan	200/25/03	Dewan Kpg. Rangawan
Simunjan (N25)	Terasi	200/25/04	SK Terasi
Simunjan (N25)	Senageh	200/25/05	Dewan Kpg. Senageh
Simunjan (N25)	Sungai Buloh	200/25/06	SK Sg. Bulu / Senageh
Simunjan (N25)	Ensengei	200/25/07	SK Sebuyau / Ensengei
Simunjan (N25)	Simunjan	200/25/08	SJK (C) Chung Hua Simunjan; Perpustakaan Kpg. Sual; SMK Sri Sadong
Simunjan (N25)	Temiang	200/25/09	SK Sg. Lingkau; Dewan Kpg. Temiang; SK Lepong Emplas; SK Gunung Ngeli
Simunjan (N25)	Sageng	200/25/10	SK Sageng; SK Abang Man
Simunjan (N25)	Sekendu	200/25/11	SK Sekendu
Simunjan (N25)	Sungai Apin	200/25/12	SK Sg. Apin
Simunjan (N25)	Tanjong Beluku	200/25/13	Dewan Kpg. Tanjung Harapan
Simunjan (N25)	Slangking	200/25/14	SK Tanjung Pisang

=== Representation history ===
Members of the Legislative Assembly for Simunjan
Assembly	No	Years	Member	Party
Constituency created from Gedong, Lingga and Tebakang
13th	N17	1991-1996	Mohd. Naroden Majais	BN (PBB)
14th	N19	1996-2001	Mohd. Naroden Majais	BN (PBB)
15th	N19	2001-2006	Mohd. Naroden Majais	BN (PBB)
16th	N21	2006-2011	Mohd. Naroden Majais	BN (PBB)
17th	N21	2011-2016	Mohd. Naroden Majais	BN (PBB)
18th	N25	2016-2018	Awla Dris	BN (PBB)
18th	N25	2018-2021	Awla Dris	GPS (PBB)
19th	N25	2021–2026	Awla Dris	GPS (PBB)

== Election results ==
Sarawak state election, 2026
Party	Candidate	Votes	%	∆%
GPS				▲
PH				▲
Total valid votes				
Total rejected ballots				
Unreturned ballots				
Turnout				
Registered electors				
Majority				

Sarawak state election, 2021
Party	Candidate	Votes	%	∆%
GPS	Awla Dris	4,276	73.02	▲73.02
PSB	Raily Reli Ali	925	15.80	▲15.80
PKR	Hapeni Fadil	518	8.85	▼15.24
PBK	Saharuddin Abdullah	137	2.34	▲2.34
Total valid votes		5,856	100.00	
Total rejected ballots		104		
Unreturned ballots		23		
Turnout		5,983	72.09	▼4.00
Registered electors		8,299		
Majority		3,351	57.22	▲10.18
GPS gain from BN		Swing		?
Source(s) https://lom.agc.gov.my/ilims/upload/portal/akta/outputp/1718688/PUB687.pdf

Sarawak state election, 2016
Party	Candidate	Votes	%	∆%
BN	Awla Dris	4,101	71.14	▼3.74
PKR	Jamilah Baharuddin	1,389	24.09	▲4.67
Independent	Hipni Kanaini	275	4.77	▲4.77
Total valid votes		5,765	100.00	
Total rejected ballots		123		
Unreturned ballots		27		
Turnout		5,915	76.09	▲2.80
Registered electors		7,774		
Majority		2,712	47.04	▼8.42
BN hold		Swing		
Source(s) "Federal Government Gazette - Notice of Contested Election, State Legislative Assembly of the State of Sarawak [P.U. (B) 190/2016]" (PDF). Attorney General's Chambers of Malaysia. 25 April 2016. "Senarai Calon yang Disahkan Layak Bertanding Pilihan Raya Dewan Undangan Negeri ke-11". Election Commission of Malaysia. 25 April 2016. Archived from the original on 25 April 2016.

Sarawak state election, 2011
Party	Candidate	Votes	%	∆%
BN	Mohd. Naroden Majais	5,465	74.88	▼2.04
PKR	Mashor Hossen	1,417	19.42	▼3.66
Love Malaysia Party	Mac Palima Nyambil	237	3.25	▲3.25
Independent	Zaini Le'	179	2.45	▲2.45
Total valid votes		7,298	100.00	
Total rejected ballots		85		
Unreturned ballots		22		
Turnout		7,405	73.29	▲9.11
Registered electors		10,104		
Majority		4,048	55.47	▲1.62
BN hold		Swing		
Source(s) "Federal Government Gazette - Results of Contested Election and Statements of the Poll after the Official Addition of Votes Sarawak [P.U. (B) 245/2011]" (PDF). Attorney General's Chambers of Malaysia. 29 April 2011.

Sarawak state election, 2006
Party	Candidate	Votes	%	∆%
BN	Mohd. Naroden Majais	4,786	76.92	▲15.22
PKR	Sakawi Nahari	1,436	23.08	▼13.87
Total valid votes		6,222	100.00	
Total rejected ballots		77		
Unreturned ballots		21		
Turnout		6,320	64.18	▼0.01
Registered electors		9,846		
Majority		3,350	53.84	▲29.09
BN hold		Swing		

Sarawak state election, 2001
Party	Candidate	Votes	%	∆%
BN	Mohd. Naroden Majais	4,088	61.70	▼28.43
PKR	Bujang Ulis	2,448	36.95	▲36.95
Independent	Muhammad Husain Mustapha	90	1.36	▲1.36
Total valid votes		6,626	100.00	
Total rejected ballots		64		
Unreturned ballots		11		
Turnout		6,701	64.19	▼3.07
Registered electors		10,439		
Majority		1,640	24.75	▼55.51
BN hold		Swing		

Sarawak state election, 1996
Party	Candidate	Votes	%	∆%
BN	Mohd. Naroden Majais	7,332	90.13	▲27.08
Independent	Shamsuddin Abdullah	803	9.87	▲9.87
Total valid votes		8,135	100.00	
Total rejected ballots		282		
Unreturned ballots		0		
Turnout		8,417	67.26	▼10.79
Registered electors		12,514		
Majority		6,529	80.26	▲48.63
BN hold		Swing		

Sarawak state election, 1991
Party	Candidate	Votes	%
BN	Mohd. Naroden Majais	4,948	63.05
PBDS	Jack Bujang	2,466	31.42
Independent	Sahari Pet	262	3.34
PERMAS	Shamsuddin Abdullah	97	1.24
NEGARA	Edmun Durong Inting	75	0.96
Total valid votes		7,848	100.00
Total rejected ballots		95	
Unreturned ballots		520	
Turnout		8,463	78.05
Registered electors		10,843	
Majority		2,482	31.63
This was a new constituency created.
