= Lingga (state constituency) =

State constituency in Sarawak, Malaysia

Lingga (N28)
Sarawak constituency

State constituency
- Legislature: Sarawak State Legislative Assembly
MLA
Vacant
- Constituency created: 1977
- First contested: 1979
- Last contested: 2026

Lingga is a state constituency in Sarawak, Malaysia, that has been represented in the Sarawak State Legislative Assembly since 1979.

The state constituency was created in the 1977 redistribution and is mandated to return a single member to the Sarawak State Legislative Assembly under the first past the post voting system.

== Demographics ==
Ethnic breakdown of Lingga's electorate as of 2022
1. Malay-Muslim bumiputera (65.3%)
2. Sarawak bumiputera (30.6%)
3. Chinese (3.60%)
4. Other ethnicities (0.50%)

== History ==
It was renamed to Bukit Begunan in 1991 (with the effect of 1987 Sarawak redelineation being applied for the 1991 elections) after it was redistributed. It was re-created in 2005.

As of 2020, Lingga has a population of 10,748 people.

=== Polling districts ===
According to the gazette issued on 31 October 2022, the Lingga constituency has a total of 6 polling districts.

State constituency	Polling Districts	Code	Location
Lingga (N28)	Lingga	201/28/01	SK St. Dunstan Seduku; SK Lela Pahlawan Lingga
Lingga (N28)	Meludam	201/28/02	Dewan Kpg. Sg. Mulon Meludam; Dewan Wanita Kpg. Triso; SJK (C) Chung Hua Meludam; SK Maludam
Lingga (N28)	Seduku	201/28/03	Bangunan Tadika KEMAS Seduku Baru; RH Augusine Nanta; RH Radin Putat
Lingga (N28)	Stumbin	201/28/04	Klinik Desa Tanjung Bijat; SMK Lingga; SK Gran / Stumbin
Lingga (N28)	Ladong	201/28/05	Tamu Simanggang; RH Charli Pruan A
Lingga (N28)	Lamanak	201/28/06	Mini Stadium Bandar Sri Aman; Dewan Sri Lamanak

=== Representation history ===
Members of the Legislative Assembly for Lingga
Assembly	No	Years	Member	Party
Constituency renamed from Lingga-Sebuyau
10th	N15	1979–1983	Daniel Tajem Miri	BN (SNAP)
11th	N15	1983–1987	Daniel Tajem Miri	PBDS
12th	N15	1987–1991	Donald Lawan	BN (PBDS)
Constituency renamed to Bukit Begunan, parts of it formed Beladin and Sebuyau
Constituency re-created from Sebuyau and Simanggang
16th	N23	2006–2011	Simoi Peri	BN (PBB)
17th	N23	2011–2016	Simoi Peri	BN (PBB)
18th	N28	2016–2018	Simoi Peri	BN (PBB)
18th	N28	2018–2021	Simoi Peri	GPS (PBB)
19th	N28	2021–2026	Dayang Noorazah Awang Sohor	GPS (PBB)

== Election results ==
Sarawak state election, 2026
Party	Candidate	Votes	%	∆%
GPS				▲
PH				▲
Total valid votes				
Total rejected ballots				
Unreturned ballots				
Turnout				
Registered electors				
Majority				

Sarawak state election, 2021
Party	Candidate	Votes	%	∆%
GPS	Dayang Noorazah Awang Sohor	3,700	58.10	▲58.10
PSB	Wan Abdillah Edruce Wan Abdul Rahman	1,427	22.41	▲8.91
Independent	Mohd Sepian Abang Daud	880	13.82	▲13.82
PBK	Baha Imam	139	2.18	▲2.18
PKR	Abang Kassim Abg Bujang	130	2.04	▼17.62
Parti Sabah Demokratik Rakyat	Abang Ahmad Abang Suni	92	1.44	▲1.44
Total valid votes		6,368	100.00	
Total rejected ballots		129		
Unreturned ballots		23		
Turnout		6,520	68.07	▼2.58
Registered electors		9,578		
Majority		2,273	35.69	▼11.49
GPS gain from BN		Swing		?

Sarawak state election, 2016
Party	Candidate	Votes	%	∆%
BN	Simoi Peri	4,169	66.84	▼3.98
PKR	Abang Zulkifli Abang Engkeh	1,226	19.66	▼2.56
Independent	Wan Abdillah Edruce Wan Abdul Rahman	842	13.50	▲13.50
Total valid votes		6,237	100.00	
Total rejected ballots		113		
Unreturned ballots		0		
Turnout		6,350	70.65	▲2.99
Registered electors		8,988		
Majority		2,943	47.19	▼1.40
BN hold		Swing		
Source(s) "Notice of Contested Election, State Legislative Assembly of the State of Sarawak [P.U. (B) 190/2016]" (PDF). Federal Government Gazette. Attorney General's Chambers of Malaysia. 25 April 2016. Archived from the original (PDF) on 12 June 2017. "Senarai Calon yang Disahkan Layak Bertanding Pilihan Raya Dewan Undangan Negeri ke-11". Election Commission of Malaysia. 25 April 2016. Archived from the original on 25 April 2016.

Sarawak state election, 2011
Party	Candidate	Votes	%	∆%
BN	Simoi Peri	3,652	70.82	▲0.58
PKR	Abang Ahmad Arabi Abang Bolhassan	1,146	22.22	▼7.54
SNAP	Abang Othman Abang Gom	359	6.96	▲6.96
Total valid votes		5,157	100.00	
Total rejected ballots		83		
Unreturned ballots		0		
Turnout		5,240	67.66	▲5.58
Registered electors		7,745		
Majority		2,506	48.59	▲8.12
BN hold		Swing		
Source(s) "Federal Government Gazette - Results of Contested Election and Statements of the Poll after the Official Addition of Votes Sarawak [P.U. (B) 245/2011]" (PDF). Attorney General's Chambers of Malaysia. 29 April 2011.

Sarawak state election, 2006
Party	Candidate	Votes	%	∆%
BN	Simoi Peri	3,245	70.24	▲70.24
PKR	Abang Othman Abang Gom	1,375	29.76	▲29.76
Total valid votes		4,620	100.00	
Total rejected ballots		52		
Unreturned ballots		12		
Turnout		4,684	62.08	
Registered electors		7,545		
Majority		1,870	40.48	
BN hold		Swing		

Sarawak state election, 1987
Party	Candidate	Votes	%	∆%
BN	Donald Lawan	4,468	50.33	▲11.18
PBDS	Daniel Tajem Miri	4,409	49.67	▼6.72
Total valid votes		8,877	100.00	
Total rejected ballots		136		
Unreturned ballots		0		
Turnout		9,013	71.09	
Registered electors		12,679		
Majority		59	0.66	▼16.59
BN gain from PBDS		Swing		?

Sarawak state election, 1983
Party	Candidate	Votes	%	∆%
PBDS	Daniel Tajem Miri	4,562	56.39	▲6.36
BN	Jacob Imang	3,167	39.15	▼10.88
Independent	Mursidi @ Mohd Morshidi Haji Umi	122	1.51	▲1.51
Independent	Donald Lawan	122	1.51	▲1.51
Independent	Wan Akil Tuanku Mahmud	116	1.43	▲1.43
Total valid votes		8,089	100.00	
Total rejected ballots		108		
Unreturned ballots		0		
Turnout		8,197	72.70	
Registered electors		11,275		
Majority		1,395	17.25	▲11.12
PBDS gain from BN		Swing		?

Sarawak state election, 1979
Party	Candidate	Votes	%
BN	Daniel Tajem Miri	3,602	50.03
Independent	Kho Su Ming	3,161	43.91
Independent	Syeed Idrus Syeed Mahmud	436	6.06
Total valid votes		7,199	100.00
Total rejected ballots		77	
Unreturned ballots		0	
Turnout		7,276	71.73
Registered electors		10,143	
Majority		441	6.13
This was a new constituency created.
