= Batu Danau =

State constituency in Sarawak, Malaysia

Batu Danau (N80)
Sarawak constituency

State constituency
- Legislature: Sarawak State Legislative Assembly
MLA
Vacant
- Constituency created: 2005
- First contested: 2006
- Last contested: 2026

Batu Danau is a state constituency in Sarawak, Malaysia, that has been represented in the Sarawak State Legislative Assembly since 2006.

The state constituency was created in the 2005 redistribution and is mandated to return a single member to the Sarawak State Legislative Assembly under the first past the post voting system.

== Demographics ==
Ethnic breakdown of Batu Danau's electorate as of 2022
1. Sarawak bumiputera (79.1%)
2. Other ethnicities (13.0%)
3. Malay-Muslim bumiputera (4.50%)
4. Chinese (3.40%)

== History ==
As of 2020, Batu Danau has a population of 13,328 people.

=== Polling districts ===
According to the Official Gazette dated 31 October 2022, the Batu Danau constituency has a total of 5 polling districts.

State constituency	Polling Districts	Code	Location
Batu Danau (N80)	Danau	221/80/01	SK Batu Danau; Dewan Kpg. Bidang; Dewan Pengkalan Madang; SK Pangkalan Jawa; SK Kuala Awang
Batu Danau (N80)	Lubai	221/80/02	SK Kuala Penganan; SK Ng. Merit; RH Luta Engkasing Lubai; SK Menuang; RH Dampin Ak Layan Terimah; RH Sli Ak Mingan Mengari, Jalan Medamit
Batu Danau (N80)	Ukong	221/80/03	RH Liban; Dewan Kpg. Lubok Lasas; Dewan Kpg. Ukong; Dewan Serbaguna Kpg. Buloh Balui; SK Tanjong; Dewan Batu Danau
Batu Danau (N80)	Medihit	221/80/04	SK Lg. Napir; RH Lawai; RH Brain; RH Sing; SK Melaban; SK Ng. Medalam
Batu Danau (N80)	Medamit	221/80/05	RH Ekom Sepangah; Dewan Masyarakat Medamit; RH Akoh Karangan Medamit; RH Tan Anak Kayan; SK Bukit Batu

=== Representation history ===
Members of the Legislative Assembly for Batu Danau
Assembly	No	Years	Member	Party
Constituency created from Ba'kelalan and Limbang
16th	N69	2006-2011	Paulus Palu Gumbang	BN (PDP)
17th	N69	2011-2014	Paulus Palu Gumbang	BN (PDP)
17th	N69	2014-2016	Paulus Palu Gumbang	TERAS
18th	N80	2016-2018	Paulus Palu Gumbang	BN (PBB)
18th	N80	2018-2021	Paulus Palu Gumbang	GPS (PBB)
19th	N80	2021–2026	Paulus Palu Gumbang	GPS (PBB)

== Election results ==
Sarawak state election, 2026: Batu Danau
Party	Candidate	Votes	%	∆%
GPS				▲
PH				▲
Total valid votes				
Total rejected ballots				
Unreturned ballots				
Turnout				
Registered electors				
Majority				

Sarawak state election, 2021: Batu Danau
Party	Candidate	Votes	%	∆%
GPS	Paulus Palu Gumbang	3,030	53.14	▲53.14
PSB	Ali Adap	2,324	40.76	▲40.76
PKR	Racha Balang	268	4.70	▲4.70
PBK	Petrus Bulan	80	1.40	▲1.40
Total valid votes		5,702	100.00	
Total rejected ballots		68		
Unreturned ballots		22		
Turnout		5,792	61.78	▼6.48
Registered electors		9,375		
Majority		706	12.38	▲38.36
GPS gain from BN		Swing		?
Source(s) https://lom.agc.gov.my/ilims/upload/portal/akta/outputp/1718688/PUB687.pdf

Sarawak state election, 2016: Batu Danau
Party	Candidate	Votes	%	∆%
BN	Paulus Palu Gumbang	4,366	75.37	▲4.24
Independent	Ali Adap	1,427	24.63	▲24.63
Total valid votes		5,793	100.00	
Total rejected ballots		103		
Unreturned ballots		13		
Turnout		5,909	68.26	▼0.19
Registered electors		8,657		
Majority		2,939	50.74	▲5.80
BN hold		Swing		{{{2}}}
Source(s) "Federal Government Gazette - Notice of Contested Election, State Legislative Assembly of the State of Sarawak [P.U. (B) 190/2016]" (PDF). Attorney General's Chambers of Malaysia. 25 April 2016. Archived from the original (PDF) on 12 June 2017. "Senarai Calon yang Disahkan Layak Bertanding Pilihan Raya Dewan Undangan Negeri ke-11". Election Commission of Malaysia. 25 April 2016. Archived from the original on 2016-04-25.

Sarawak state election, 2011: Batu Danau
Party	Candidate	Votes	%	∆%
BN	Paulus Palu Gumbang	3,667	71.13	▲7.59
PKR	Lau Liak Koi	1,348	26.15	▲26.15
SNAP	Lawrence Cosmas Sunang Simpang	140	2.72	▼33.74
Total valid votes		5,155	100.00	
Total rejected ballots		72		
Unreturned ballots		0		
Turnout		5,227	68.45	▼0.42
Registered electors		7,636		
Majority		2,319	44.98	▲17.90
BN hold		Swing		{{{2}}}
Source(s) "Federal Government Gazette - Results of Contested Election and Statements of the Poll after the Official Addition of Votes Sarawak [P.U. (B) 245/2011]" (PDF). Attorney General's Chambers of Malaysia. 29 April 2011.

Sarawak state election, 2006: Batu Danau
Party	Candidate	Votes	%
BN	Paulus Palu Gumbang	2,961	63.54
SNAP	Christopher Sawan Jiram	1,699	36.46
Total valid votes		4,660	100.00
Total rejected ballots		79	
Unreturned ballots		6	
Turnout		4,745	68.87
Registered electors		6,889	
Majority		1,262	27.08
This was a new constituency created.
