= Bukit Goram =

Bukit Goram (N63)
Sarawak constituency

State constituency
- Legislature: Sarawak State Legislative Assembly
MLA
Vacant
- Constituency created: 2015
- First contested: 2016
- Last contested: 2026

Bukit Goram is a state constituency in Sarawak, Malaysia, that has been represented in the Sarawak State Legislative Assembly since 2016.

The state constituency was created in the 2015 redistribution and is mandated to return a single member to the Sarawak State Legislative Assembly under the first past the post voting system.

== Demographics ==
Ethnic breakdown of Bukit Goram's electorate as of 2022
1. Sarawak bumiputera (76.4%)
2. Chinese (17.2%)
3. Malay-Muslim bumiputera (5.50%)
4. Other ethnicities (0.90%)

== History ==
As of 2020, Bukit Goram has a population of 22,570 people.

=== Polling districts ===
According to the gazette issued on 31 October 2022, the Bukit Goram constituency has a total of 8 polling districts.

State constituency	Polling Districts	Code	Location
Bukit Goram (N63)	Sungai Kapit	215/63/01	SK Sg. Kapit; RH Bundong, Sebabai Ili, Jalan Bukit Goram
Bukit Goram (N63)	Kapit	215/63/02	SJK (C) Hock Lam Kapit
Bukit Goram (N63)	Menuan	215/63/03	SK Ulu Menuan; RH Sli Sg. Menuan; RH Manggan Menuan; RH Lampoh Sg Menuan; SK Lepong Menuan; RH Jambon, Ng. Ensilai; RH Dingai Ng. Goh
Bukit Goram (N63)	Ibau	215/63/04	SK Ulu Yong; RH Manok Sg Yong; RH Empawi Sg. Yong; RH Ngelai Sg. Yong; SK Ng. Terusa; RH Nuga, Semujan Ili Belawai; RH Seliong, Sekerangan Atas, Sg. Belawai; RH Bena, Ng Sema. Sg Yong; RH Ekau, Ng Semawang, Batang Rajang; RH Kayan, Ng Dia, Batang Rajang; SK Ng. Segenok; RH Beli, Ng Ensurai, Sg. Ibau; SK Ng Ibau
Bukit Goram (N63)	Kampung Baru	215/63/05	SK Kapit
Bukit Goram (N63)	Selirik	215/63/06	SK Methodist; RH Juin, Rantau Tapang, Sg Seranau; RH Barnabas, Kampung Serian, Batang Rajang; RH Ayu, Ng. Tulie Baruh
Bukit Goram (N63)	Sibau	215/63/07	RH John Sg. Sibau
Bukit Goram (N63)	Entagai	215/63/08	RH Baja Sg. Entangai; SK Ulu Melipis; RH Untat Sg. Melipis; RH Robert

=== Representation history ===
Members of the Legislative Assembly for Bukit Goram
Assembly	No	Years	Member	Party
Constituency created from Pelagus and Katibas
18th	N63	2016-2018	Jefferson Jamit Unyat	BN (PBB)
18th	N63	2018-2021	Jefferson Jamit Unyat	GPS (PBB)
19th	N63	2021–2026	Jefferson Jamit Unyat	GPS (PBB)

== Election results ==
Sarawak state election, 2026: Bukit Goram
Party	Candidate	Votes	%	∆%
GPS				▲
PH				▲
Total valid votes				
Total rejected ballots				
Unreturned ballots				
Turnout				
Registered electors				
Majority				

Sarawak state election, 2021: Bukit Goram
Party	Candidate	Votes	%	∆%
GPS	Jefferson Jamit Unyat	4,253	68.45	▲68.45
DAP	Joseph Jinggut	715	11.51	▼18.92
PSB	Robert Segie	689	11.09	▲11.09
PBK	Puso Bujang	297	4.78	▲4.78
PBDS Baru	Robert Saweng	259	4.17	▲4.17
Total valid votes		6,213	100.00	
Total rejected ballots		111		
Unreturned ballots		56		
Turnout		6,380	52.51	▼6.24
Registered electors		12,150		
Majority		3,538	56.94	▲17.79
GPS gain from BN		Swing		▼1.12
Source(s) https://lom.agc.gov.my/ilims/upload/portal/akta/outputp/1718688/PUB687.pdf

Sarawak state election, 2016: Bukit Goram
Party	Candidate	Votes	%
BN	Jefferson Jamit Unyat	4,596	69.57
DAP	Larry Asap	2,010	30.43
Total valid votes		6,606	100.00
Total rejected ballots		110	
Unreturned ballots		46	
Turnout		6,762	58.75
Registered electors		11,510	
Majority		2,586	39.15
Source(s) "Federal Government Gazette - Notice of Contested Election, State Legislative Assembly of the State of Sarawak [P.U. (B) 190/2016]" (PDF). Attorney General's Chambers of Malaysia. 25 April 2016. Archived from the original (PDF) on 12 June 2017. "Senarai Calon yang Disahkan Layak Bertanding Pilihan Raya Dewan Undangan Negeri ke-11". Election Commission of Malaysia. 25 April 2016. Archived from the original on 2016-04-25.
