= Serembu =

State constituency in Sarawak, Malaysia

Serembu (N18)
Sarawak constituency

State constituency
- Legislature: Sarawak State Legislative Assembly
MLA
Vacant
- Constituency created: 2015
- First contested: 2016
- Last contested: 2026

Serembu is a state constituency in Sarawak, Malaysia, that has been represented in the Sarawak State Legislative Assembly since 2016.

The state constituency was created in the 2015 redistribution and is mandated to return a single member to the Sarawak State Legislative Assembly under the first past the post voting system.

== Demographics ==
Ethnic breakdown of Serembu's electorate as of 2022
1. Sarawak bumiputera (73.9%)
2. Chinese (20.2%)
3. Malay-Muslim bumiputera (5.40%)
4. Other ethnicities (0.50%)

== History ==
As of 2020, Serembu has a population of 16,746 people.

=== Polling districts ===
According to the gazette issued on 31 October 2022, the Serembu constituency has a total of 22 polling districts.

State constituency	Polling Districts	Code	Location
Serembu（N18）	Siniawan	198/18/01	SJK (C) Chung Hua Siniawan
Serembu（N18）	Kranji	198/18/02	SJK (C) Chung Hua Keranji
Serembu（N18）	Kopit	198/18/03	Balai Raya Kpg. Kopit
Serembu（N18）	Krokong	198/18/04	Dewan Masyarakat Krokong
Serembu（N18）	Podam	198/18/05	SK Podam
Serembu（N18）	Penijau Baru	198/18/06	Balai Raya Kpg. Peninjau Baru
Serembu（N18）	Merembeh	198/18/07	Balai Raya Merembeh
Serembu（N18）	Kandis	198/18/08	SK Siniawan
Serembu（N18）	Sungai Pinang	198/18/09	SK Sg. Pinang
Serembu（N18）	Paku	198/18/10	SJK (C) Chung Hua Paku
Serembu（N18）	Tanjung Durian	198/18/11	SK Serembu
Serembu（N18）	Seropak	198/18/12	Balai Raya Kpg. Seropak
Serembu（N18）	Seromah	198/18/13	Balai Raya Kpg. Seromah
Serembu（N18）	Segubang	198/18/14	Balai Raya Kpg. Segubang
Serembu（N18）	Sogo	198/18/15	Dewan Serbaguna Kpg. Skio; Balai Raya Kpg. Sogo
Serembu（N18）	Rabak Rotan	198/18/16	Dewan Tringgus Bong
Serembu（N18）	Pangkalan Tebang	198/18/17	Balai Raya Pangkalan Tebang; Balai Raya Ledan Gumbang
Serembu（N18）	Monggak	198/18/18	Balai Raya Bijurey
Serembu（N18）	Blimbin	198/18/19	Balai Raya Kpg. Blimbin
Serembu（N18）	Gumbang	198/18/20	Balai Raya Kpg. Gumbang
Serembu（N18）	Padang Pan	198/18/21	Dewan Serbaguna Kpg. Padang Pan
Serembu（N18）	Puak Krokong	198/18/22	Dewan Serbaguna Kpg. Puak Krokong (Baru)

=== Representation history ===
Members of the Legislative Assembly for Serembu
Assembly	No	Years	Member	Party
Constituency created from Bengoh and Tasik Biru
18th	N18	2016-2018	Miro Simuh	BN (PBB)
18th	N18	2018–2021	Miro Simuh	GPS (PBB)
19th	N18	2021–2026	Miro Simuh	GPS (PBB)

== Election results ==
Sarawak state election, 2026: Serembu
Party	Candidate	Votes	%	∆%
GPS				▲
PH				▲
Total valid votes				
Total rejected ballots				
Unreturned ballots				
Turnout				
Registered electors				
Majority				

Sarawak state election, 2021: Serembu
Party	Candidate	Votes	%	∆%
GPS	Miro Simuh	4,068	57.69	▲57.69
PSB	Iana Akam	2,418	34.29	▲34.29
PBK	Jecky Misieng	257	3.64	▲3.64
PKR	Michael Sawing	217	3.08	▼14.71
ASPIRASI	Buln Ribos	92	1.30	▲1.30
Total valid votes		7,052	100.00	
Total rejected ballots		95		
Unreturned ballots		8		
Turnout		7,155	72.76	▼4.48
Registered electors		9,834		
Majority		1,650	23.40	▲2.99
GPS gain from BN		Swing		?
Source(s) https://lom.agc.gov.my/ilims/upload/portal/akta/outputp/1718688/PUB687.pdf

Sarawak state election, 2016: Serembu
Party	Candidate	Votes	%
BN	Miro Simuh	3,452	50.43
Independent	Nyomek Nyeap	2,055	30.02
PKR	Athina Klaywa Sim	1,218	17.79
STAR	Buln Patrick Ribos	120	1.75
Total valid votes		6,845	100.00
Total rejected ballots		138	
Unreturned ballots		19	
Turnout		7,002	77.24
Registered electors		9,065	
Majority		1,397	20.41
This was a new constituency created.
Source(s) "Federal Government Gazette - Notice of Contested Election, State Legislative Assembly of the State of Sarawak [P.U. (B) 190/2016]" (PDF). Attorney General's Chambers of Malaysia. 25 April 2016. Archived from the original (PDF) on 2017-06-12. "Senarai Calon yang Disahkan Layak Bertanding Pilihan Raya Dewan Undangan Negeri ke-11". Election Commission of Malaysia. 25 April 2016. Archived from the original on 25 April 2016.
