= Samalaju =

State constituency in Sarawak, Malaysia

Samalaju (N70)
Sarawak constituency

State constituency
- Legislature: Sarawak State Legislative Assembly
MLA
Vacant
- Constituency created: 2015
- First contested: 2016
- Last contested: 2026

Samalaju is a state constituency in Sarawak, Malaysia, that has been represented in the Sarawak State Legislative Assembly since 2016.

The state constituency was created in the 2015 redistribution and is mandated to return a single member to the Sarawak State Legislative Assembly under the first past the post voting system.

== Demographics ==
Ethnic breakdown of Samalaju's electorate as of 2022
1. Sarawak bumiputera (66.6%)
2. Malay-Muslim bumiputera (21.4%)
3. Chinese (10.6%)
4. Other ethnicities (1.40%)

== History ==
As of 2020, Samalaju has a population of 78,734 people.

=== Polling districts ===
According to the gazette issued on 31 October 2022, the Samalaju constituency has a total of 7 polling districts.

State constituency	Polling Districts	Code	Location
Samalaju (N70)	Sibiew Similaju	217/70/01	SK Kem Batu 18; Blok A & B SJK (C) Sebiew Chinese
Samalaju (N70)	Tanjung Kidurong	217/70/02	SMK Asyakirin
Samalaju (N70)	Suai	217/70/03	RH Galau Ak Sawing, Sg. Telong; SK Kpg. Tegaging; SK Kpg. Iran; SK Sg. Sebatu; SK Kuala Nyalau
Samalaju (N70)	Melor	217/70/04	SMK Kidurong
Samalaju (N70)	Mawar	217/70/05	SK Kidurong
Samalaju (N70)	RPR Kidurong	217/70/06	SK Kidurong II
Samalaju (N70)	LKTS Suai	217/70/07	SK Suai Satu Niah

=== Representation history ===
Members of the Legislative Assembly for Samalaju
Assembly	No	Years	Member	Party
Constituency created from Kidurong and Kemena
18th	N70	2016-2018	Majang Renggi	BN (PRS)
18th	N70	2018-2021	Majang Renggi	GPS (PRS)
19th	N70	2021–2026	Majang Renggi	GPS (PRS)

== Election results ==
Sarawak state election, 2026: Samalaju
Party	Candidate	Votes	%	∆%
GPS				▲
PH				▲
Total valid votes				
Total rejected ballots				
Unreturned ballots				
Turnout				
Registered electors				
Majority				

Sarawak state election, 2021: Samalaju
Party	Candidate	Votes	%	∆%
GPS	Majang Renggi	7,547	67.05	▲67.05
DAP	Tony Ung	1,504	13.36	▼20.28
PSB	Reggie Suel	1,496	13.29	▲13.29
PBK	Leighton Manjah	509	4.52	▲4.52
PBDS Baru	Baba Emperan	199	1.77	▲1.77
Total valid votes		11,255	100.00	
Total rejected ballots		171		
Unreturned ballots		25		
Turnout		11,451	63.68	▼4.44
Registered electors		17,981		
Majority		6,042	53.68	▲25.98
GPS gain from BN		Swing		?
Source(s) https://lom.agc.gov.my/ilims/upload/portal/akta/outputp/1718688/PUB687.pdf

Sarawak state election, 2016: Samalaju
Party	Candidate	Votes	%
BN	Majang Renggi	5,456	61.34
DAP	Baba Emperan	2,992	33.64
PAS	Zharudin Narudin	447	5.03
Total valid votes		8,895	100.00
Total rejected ballots		120	
Unreturned ballots		11	
Turnout		9,026	68.12
Registered electors		13,251	
Majority		2,464	27.70
Source(s) "Federal Government Gazette - Notice of Contested Election, State Legislative Assembly of the State of Sarawak [P.U. (B) 190/2016]" (PDF). Attorney General's Chambers of Malaysia. 25 April 2016. Archived from the original (PDF) on 2017-06-12. "Senarai Calon yang Disahkan Layak Bertanding Pilihan Raya Dewan Undangan Negeri ke-11". Election Commission of Malaysia. 25 April 2016. Archived from the original on 25 April 2016.
