= Padungan (state constituency) =

State constituency in Sarawak, Malaysia

Padungan (N09)
Sarawak constituency

State constituency
- Legislature: Sarawak State Legislative Assembly
MLA
Vacant
- Constituency created: 1977
- First contested: 1979
- Last contested: 2026

Padungan is a state constituency in Sarawak, Malaysia, that has been represented in the Sarawak State Legislative Assembly since 1979.

The state constituency was created in the 1977 redistribution and is mandated to return a single member to the Sarawak State Legislative Assembly under the first past the post voting system.

== Demographics ==
Ethnic breakdown of Padungan's electorate as of 2022
1. Chinese (89.1%)
2. Malay-Muslim bumiputera (5.70%)
3. Sarawak bumiputera (3.60%)
4. Other ethnicities (1.40%)

== History ==
As of 2020, Padungan has a population of 14,179 people.

=== Polling districts ===
According to the gazette issued on 31 October 2022, the Padungan constituency has a total of 13 polling districts.

State constituency	Polling Districts	Code	Location
Padungan (N09)	Market	195/09/01	SMK St. Thomas Kuching
Padungan (N09)	Bazaar	195/09/02	SK St. Mary Kuching
Padungan (N09)	Padungan	195/09/03	SMK Tinggi Kuching
Padungan (N09)	Abell	195/09/04	SJK (C) Song Keng Hai (Blok A)
Padungan (N09)	Deshon	195/09/05	SJK (C) Chung Hua No.3 (Kanan)
Padungan (N09)	Sekama	195/09/06	SK Lumba Kuda Kuching (Blok A)
Padungan (N09)	Bukit Tuan	195/09/07	SK Batu Lintang Kuching
Padungan (N09)	Kinyang	195/09/08	SK Catholic English Kuching
Padungan (N09)	Ellis	195/09/09	SMK Padungan (Blok A)
Padungan (N09)	Ban Hock	195/05/10	SJK (C) Song Kueng Hai (Blok B)
Padungan (N09)	Lumba Kuda	195/09/11	SMK Padungan (Blok B)
Padungan (N09)	Central	195/09/12	SJK (C) Chung Hua 3 (Kiri)
Padungan (N09)	Petanak	195/09/13	SK Lumba Kuda Kuching (Block B)

=== Representation history ===
Members of the Legislative Assembly for Padungan
Assembly	No	Years	Member	Party
Constituency created from Kuching Timor
10th	N03	1979-1983	Tan Meng Chong (陳明聰)	Independent
11th	N03	1983-1987	Song Swee Guan (宋瑞源)	BN (SUPP)
12th	N03	1987-1991	Song Swee Guan (宋瑞源)	BN (SUPP)
13th	N07	1991-1996	Song Swee Guan (宋瑞源)	BN (SUPP)
14th	N08	1996-2001	Song Swee Guan (宋瑞源)	BN (SUPP)
15th	N08	2001-2006	Lily Yong Lee Lee (楊莉)	BN (SUPP)
16th	N09	2006-2011	Dominique Ng Kim Ho (黃錦河)	PR (PKR)
17th	N09	2011-2016	Wong King Wei (黃慶偉)	PR (DAP)
18th	N09	2016-2020	Wong King Wei (黃慶偉)	PH (DAP)
18th	N09	2020-2021	Wong King Wei (黃慶偉)	Independent
19th	N09	2021–2026	Chong Chieng Jen (張健仁)	PH (DAP)

== Election results ==
Sarawak state election, 2026
Party	Candidate	Votes	%	∆%
GPS				▲
DAP	Michael Kong Feng Nian			▲
PBK	Tiong Ing Neng			▲
Total valid votes				
Total rejected ballots				
Unreturned ballots				
Turnout				
Registered electors				
Majority				

Sarawak state election, 2021
Party	Candidate	Votes	%	∆%
DAP	Chong Chieng Jen	4,686	50.40	▼13.91
GPS	Wee Hong Seng	3,488	37.52	▲37.52
PBK	Raymond Thong Ee Yu	930	10.00	▲10.00
ASPIRASI	Soo Lina	193	2.08	▲1.28
Total valid votes		9,297	100.00	
Total rejected ballots		53		
Unreturned ballots		26		
Turnout		9,376	44.76	▼20.72
Registered electors		20,949		
Majority		1,198	12.89	▼16.54
DAP hold		Swing		
Source(s) https://lom.agc.gov.my/ilims/upload/portal/akta/outputp/1718688/PUB687.pdf

Sarawak state election, 2016
Party	Candidate	Votes	%	∆%
DAP	Wong King Wei	9,332	64.31	▼8.29
BN	Pau Kiu Sung	5,062	34.89	▲10.16
STAR	Teo Kuang Kim	116	0.80	▲0.80
Total valid votes		14,510	100.00	
Total rejected ballots		78		
Unreturned ballots		14		
Turnout		14,602	65.48	▼4.75
Registered electors		22,301		
Majority		4,270	29.43	▼18.44
DAP hold		Swing		
Source(s) "Federal Government Gazette - Notice of Contested Election, State Legislative Assembly of the State of Sarawak [P.U. (B) 190/2016]" (PDF). Attorney General's Chambers of Malaysia. 25 April 2016. Archived from the original (PDF) on 12 June 2017. "Senarai Calon yang Disahkan Layak Bertanding Pilihan Raya Dewan Undangan Negeri ke-11". Election Commission of Malaysia. 25 April 2016. Archived from the original on 25 April 2016.

Sarawak state election, 2011
Party	Candidate	Votes	%	∆%
DAP	Wong King Wei	11,957	72.60	▲72.60
BN	Sim Kiang Chiok	4,073	24.73	▼20.41
Independent	Dominique Ng Kim Ho	439	2.67	▲2.67
Total valid votes		16,469	100.00	
Total rejected ballots		69		
Unreturned ballots		20		
Turnout		16,558	70.23	▲10.04
Registered electors		23,576		
Majority		7,884	47.87	▲38.16
DAP gain from PKR		Swing		?
Source(s) "Federal Government Gazette - Results of Contested Election and Statements of the Poll after the Official Addition of Votes Sarawak [P.U. (B) 245/2011]" (PDF). Attorney General's Chambers of Malaysia. 29 April 2011.

Sarawak state election, 2006
Party	Candidate	Votes	%	∆%
PKR	Ng Kim Ho	8,002	54.86	▲54.86
BN	Lily Yong Lee Lee	6,585	45.14	▼8.13
Total valid votes		14,587	100.00	
Total rejected ballots		118		
Unreturned ballots		50		
Turnout		14,755	60.19	▼4.91
Registered electors		24,512		
Majority		1,417	9.71	▲3.16
PKR gain from BN		Swing		?

Sarawak state election, 2001
Party	Candidate	Votes	%	∆%
BN	Lily Yong Lee Lee	8,402	53.27	▼2.99
DAP	Chong Chieng Jen	7,369	46.73	▲4.89
Total valid votes		15,771	100.00	
Total rejected ballots		280		
Unreturned ballots		208		
Turnout		16,259	65.10	▲3.75
Registered electors		24,977		
Majority		1,033	6.55	▼7.87
BN hold		Swing		

Sarawak state election, 1996
Party	Candidate	Votes	%	∆%
BN	Song Swee Guan	8,319	56.26	▼9.28
DAP	Ng Kim Ho	6,187	41.84	▲7.38
Independent	Eric Lee Hie Kui	282	1.91	▲1.91
Total valid votes		14,788	100.00	
Total rejected ballots		84		
Unreturned ballots		43		
Turnout		14,915	61.35	▼9.71
Registered electors		24,310		
Majority		2,132	14.42	▼16.66
BN hold		Swing		

Sarawak state election, 1991
Party	Candidate	Votes	%	∆%
BN	Song Swee Guan	8,836	65.54	▲2.59
DAP	Ng Kim Ho	4,646	34.46	▼2.59
Total valid votes		13,482	100.00	
Total rejected ballots		67		
Unreturned ballots		25		
Turnout		13,574	71.06	▼3.61
Registered electors		19,101		
Majority		4,190	31.08	▲5.21
BN hold		Swing		

Sarawak state election, 1987
Party	Candidate	Votes	%	∆%
BN	Song Swee Guan	14,499	62.94	▲6.99
DAP	Tay Cheo Hong	8,538	37.06	▼1.89
Total valid votes		23,037	100.00	
Total rejected ballots		92		
Unreturned ballots		0		
Turnout		23,129	74.89	▼2.41
Registered electors		30,882		
Majority		5,961	25.88	▲8.87
BN hold		Swing		

Sarawak state election, 1983
Party	Candidate	Votes	%	∆%
BN	Song Swee Guan	11,665	55.96	▲5.71
DAP	Sim Kwang Yang	8,121	38.96	▲2.25
SNAP	Alexander John Shek Kwok Bun	1,058	5.08	▼6.55
Total valid votes		20,844	100.00	
Total rejected ballots		124		
Unreturned ballots		0		
Turnout		20,968	77.76	▲1.31
Registered electors		26,966		
Majority		3,544	17.00	▲3.49
BN gain from Independent		Swing		?

Sarawak state election, 1979
Party	Candidate	Votes	%
Independent	Tan Meng Chong	8,041	50.22
DAP	Sim Kwang Yang	5,877	36.71
BN	Cheng Yew Kiew	1,861	11.62
Independent	Tan Tak Seng	174	1.09
Independent	Sieh Tzu Tsing	59	0.37
Total valid votes		16,012	100.00
Total rejected ballots		98	
Unreturned ballots		0	
Turnout		16,110	76.93
Registered electors		20,941	
Majority		2,164	13.51
This was a new constituency created.
