= Dominique Ng Kim Ho =

Malaysian politician

Member of the Sarawak State Legislative Assembly for Padungan
- In office 20 May 2006 – 16 April 2011
- Preceded by: Lily Yong Lee Lee (BN–SUPP)
- Succeeded by: Wong King Wei (PR–DAP)
- Majority: 1,417 (2006)

Personal details
- Born: 4 April 1961 (age 65)
- Party: People's Justice Party (PKR) (–2011; 2020–present)
- Other political affiliations: Pakatan Rakyat (PR) (2008–2011); Pakatan Harapan (PH) (2020–present)
- Children: Cherishe Ng Phuay Hui (Daughter)
- Occupation: Politician

Dominique Ng Kim Ho (born 4 April 1961) is a Malaysian politician who served as Member of the Sarawak State Legislative Assembly (MLA) for Padungan from May 2006 to April 2011. He is a member of People's Justice Party (PKR) and was a member of Democratic Action Party (DAP), a component party of Pakatan Harapan (PH) and formerly Pakatan Rakyat (PR) coalitions. He is the father of Cherishe Ng Phuay Hui, PKR candidate of Batu Lintang.

== Political career ==
Dominique Ng Kim Ho rejoined PKR in 2020 after he left the party in 2011.

He was elected as Bandar Kuching PKR Branch Chief unopposed in 2025.

== Election results ==
Parliament of Malaysia
Year	Constituency	Candidate	Votes	Pct	Opponent(s)	Votes	Pct	Ballots cast	Majority	Turnout
1999	P169 Bandar Kuching	Dominique Ng Kim Ho (IND)	9,850	28.97%	Song Swee Guan (SUPP)	18,239	53.64%	34,693	8,389	63.06%
1999	P169 Bandar Kuching	Dominique Ng Kim Ho (IND)	9,850	28.97%	Chong Chieng Jen (DAP)	5,913	17.39%	34,693	8,389	63.06%

Sarawak State Legislative Assembly
Year	Constituency	Candidate	Votes	Pct	Opponent(s)	Votes	Pct	Ballots cast	Majority	Turnout
1991	N07 Padungan	Dominique Ng Kim Ho (DAP)	4,646	34.46%	Song Swee Guan (SUPP)	8,836	65.54%	13,574	4,190	71.06%
1996	N08 Padungan	Dominique Ng Kim Ho (DAP)	6,187	41.84%	Song Swee Guan (SUPP)	8,319	56.26%	14,915	2,132	61.35%
1996	N08 Padungan	Dominique Ng Kim Ho (DAP)	6,187	41.84%	Eric Lee Hie Kui (IND)	282	1.91%	14,915	2,132	61.35%
2006	N09 Padungan	Dominique Ng Kim Ho (PKR)	8,002	54.86%	Lily Yong Lee Lee (SUPP)	6,585	45.14%	14,755	1,417	60.19%
2011	N09 Padungan	Dominique Ng Kim Ho (IND)	439	2.67%	Wong King Wei (DAP)	11,957	72.60%	16,558	7,884	70.23%
2011	N09 Padungan	Dominique Ng Kim Ho (IND)	439	2.67%	Sim Kiang Chiok (SUPP)	4,073	24.73%	16,558	7,884	70.23%
