= Daro (state constituency) =

State constituency in Sarawak, Malaysia

Daro (N43)
Sarawak constituency

State constituency
- Legislature: Sarawak State Legislative Assembly
MLA
Vacant
- Constituency created: 2005
- First contested: 2006
- Last contested: 2026

Daro is a state constituency in Sarawak, Malaysia, that has been represented in the Sarawak State Legislative Assembly since 2006.

The state constituency was created in the 2005 redistribution and is mandated to return a single member to the Sarawak State Legislative Assembly under the first past the post voting system.

== Demographics ==
Ethnic breakdown of Daro's electorate as of 2022
1. Malay-Muslim bumiputera (68.7%)
2. Sarawak bumiputera (26.9%)
3. Chinese (3.60%)
4. Other ethnicities (0.80%)

== History ==
As of 2020, Daro has a population of 14,409 people.

=== Polling districts ===
According to the gazette issued on 31 October 2022, the Daro constituency has a total of 6 polling districts.

State constituency	Polling Districts	Code	Location
Daro (N43）	Semah	207/43/01	RH Magerat Ak Rentap; SK Ng. Semah; SK Sebena; SK Penasu
Daro (N43）	Tebaang	207/43/02	SK Campuran Daro; SK Kpg. Tebaang
Daro (N43）	Daro	207/43/03	SK Kpg. Nangar; SK Hijrah Badong; Tadika Kie Ming Daro
Daro (N43）	Lemang Peh	207/43/04	SK Ulu Daro; SK Kpg. Pabgtray Daro
Daro (N43）	Lassa	207/43/05	SK Sg. Lengan; SK Sg. Singat; SK Sawai; SK Sg. Pasin; SK Batang Lassa
Daro (N43）	Lebaan	207/43/06	SK Bukit Papit

=== Representation history ===
Members of the Legislative Assembly for Daro
Assembly	No	Years	Member	Party
Constituency created, created from Matu-Daro and Serdeng
16th	N37	2006-2011	Murni Suhaili	BN (PBB)
17th	N37	2011-2016	Murni Suhaili	BN (PBB)
18th	N43	2016–2018	Safiee Ahmad	BN (PBB)
18th	N43	2018-2021	Safiee Ahmad	GPS (PBB)
19th	N43	2021–2026	Safiee Ahmad	GPS (PBB)

== Election results ==
Sarawak state election, 2026
Party	Candidate	Votes	%	∆%
GPS				▲
PH				▲
Total valid votes				
Total rejected ballots				
Unreturned ballots				
Turnout				
Registered electors				
Majority				

Sarawak state election, 2021
Party	Candidate	Votes	%	∆%
GPS	Safiee Ahmad	5,317	93.18	▲93.18
Independent	Jamaludin Ibrahim	205	3.59	▲3.59
PBK	Ting Ing Hua	184	3.22	▲3.22
Total valid votes		5,706	100.00	
Total rejected ballots		101		
Unreturned ballots		23		
Turnout		5,830	63.40	▼4.13
Registered electors		9,195		
Majority		5,112	89.59	▲9.99
GPS gain from BN		Swing		?
Source(s) https://lom.agc.gov.my/ilims/upload/portal/akta/outputp/1718688/PUB687.pdf

Sarawak state election, 2016
Party	Candidate	Votes	%	∆%
BN	Safiee Ahmad	5,001	89.78	▲14.56
Amanah	Ibrahim Bayau	569	10.22	▲10.22
Total valid votes		5,570	100.00	
Total rejected ballots		147		
Unreturned ballots		17		
Turnout		5,734	67.53	▼4.54
Registered electors		8,491		
Majority		4,432	79.60	▲17.40
BN hold		Swing		
Source(s) "Federal Government Gazette - Notice of Contested Election, State Legislative Assembly of the State of Sarawak [P.U. (B) 190/2016]" (PDF). Attorney General's Chambers of Malaysia. 25 April 2016. Archived from the original (PDF) on 2017-06-12. "Senarai Calon yang Disahkan Layak Bertanding Pilihan Raya Dewan Undangan Negeri ke-11". Election Commission of Malaysia. 25 April 2016. Archived from the original on 2016-04-25.

Sarawak state election, 2011
Party	Candidate	Votes	%	∆%
BN	Murni Suhaili	3,867	75.22	▲75.22
Independent	Mohamad Zamhari Berawi	670	13.03	▲13.03
PKR	Jamaludin Ibrahim	475	9.24	▲9.24
Independent	Noh @ Mohamad Noh Bakri @ Bakeri	129	2.51	▲2.51
Total valid votes		5,141	100.00	
Total rejected ballots		105		
Unreturned ballots		19		
Turnout		5,265	72.07	
Registered electors		7,305		
Majority		3,197	62.20	
BN hold		Swing		
Source(s) "Federal Government Gazette - Results of Contested Election and Statements of the Poll after the Official Addition of Votes Sarawak [P.U. (B) 245/2011]" (PDF). Attorney General's Chambers of Malaysia. 29 April 2011.

Sarawak state election, 2006
Party	Candidate	Votes	%
On the nomination day, Murni Suhaili won uncontested.
BN	Murni Suhaili		
Total valid votes			100.00
Total rejected ballots			
Unreturned ballots			
Turnout			
Registered electors		7,411	
Majority			
This was a new constituency created.
