= Simoi Peri =

Malaysian politician

Hajah Simoi Peri KMN

Member of the Sarawak State Legislative Assembly for Lingga
- In office 20 May 2006 – 3 November 2021
- Preceded by: Constituency created
- Succeeded by: Dayang Noorazah Awang Sohor (GPS−PBB)
- Majority: 2,943 (2016)

Personal details
- Born: 20 January 1964 (age 62) Sarawak
- Party: Parti Pesaka Bumiputera Bersatu (PBB)
- Other political affiliations: Barisan Nasional (BN) (−2018); Gabungan Parti Sarawak (GPS) (2018–present)
- Occupation: Politician

Simoi binti Peri is a Malaysian politician based in the state of Sarawak from the Parti Pesaka Bumiputera Bersatu (PBB), a major component party of the ruling Gabungan Parti Sarawak (GPS) coalition of the state. He has also served as the Member of the Sarawak State Legislative Assembly (MLA) for Lingga from 2006 to 2021.

Prior to being elected, she worked at the State Islamic Department. In 2006, she joined the Parti Pesaka Bumiputera Bersatu (PBB). She defeated Abang Othman Abang Gom of the People's Justice Party to win the Lingga seat in the state assembly. In March 2011, Peri announced that she would not run for reelection. However, she was subsequently re-nominated and ran for reelection at the request of the leadership of the Barisan Nasional party. Peri was re-elected in 2011 and in 2016.

She also served as chief of PBB Lingga and as a member of the Supreme Council of the Women's Wing of PBB Sarawak.

== Election results ==
Sarawak State Legislative Assembly
Year	Constituency	Candidate	Votes	Pct	Opponent(s)	Votes	Pct	Ballots cast	Majority	Turnout
2006	N23 Lingga	Simoi Peri (PBB)	3,245	70.24%	Abang Othman Abang Gom (PKR)	1,375	29.76%	4,684	1,870	62.08%
2011	N23 Lingga	Simoi Peri (PBB)	3,652	70.82%	Abang Ahmad Arabi Abang Bolhassan (PKR)	1,146	22.22%	5,240	2,506	67.66%
2011	N23 Lingga	Simoi Peri (PBB)	3,652	70.82%	Abang Othman Abang Gom (SNAP)	359	6.96%	5,240	2,506	67.66%
2016	N28 Lingga	Simoi Peri (PBB)	4,169	66.84%	Abang Zulkifli Abang Engkeh (PKR)	1,226	19.66%	6,350	2,943	70.65%
2016	N28 Lingga	Simoi Peri (PBB)	4,169	66.84%	Wan Abdillah Edruce Wan Abdul Rahman (IND)	842	13.50%	6,350	2,943	70.65%

== Honours ==
- Malaysia
  - Officer of the Order of the Defender of the Realm (KMN) (2015)
