= Awla Dris =

Malaysian politician

Yang Berhormat Awla Dris MLA
- اولا دريس

Member of the Sarawak State Legislative Assembly for Simunjan
- Incumbent
- Assumed office 2016
- Preceded by: Mohd. Naroden Majais

Personal details
- Born: Awla bin Dris Sarawak
- Citizenship: Malaysian
- Party: PBB
- Other political affiliations: Barisan Nasional (till 2018); Gabungan Parti Sarawak (since 2018)
- Occupation: Politician

Awla bin Dris is a Malaysian politician from PBB. He has served as the Member of the Sarawak State Legislative Assembly for Simunjan since 2016.

== Election results ==
Sarawak State Legislative Assembly
Year	Constituency	Candidate	Votes	Pct.	Opponent(s)	Votes	Pct.	Ballots cast	Majority	Turnout
2016	N25 Simunjan	Awla Dris (PBB)	4,101	71.14%	Jamilah Baharuddin (PKR)	1,389	24.09%	5,915	2,712	76.09%
2016	N25 Simunjan	Awla Dris (PBB)	4,101	71.14%	Hipni Kanaini (IND)	275	4.77%	5,915	2,712	76.09%
2021	N25 Simunjan	Awla Dris (PBB)	4,276	73.02%	Raily Reli Ali (PSB)	925	15.80%	5,983	3,351	72.09%
2021	N25 Simunjan	Awla Dris (PBB)	4,276	73.02%	Hapeni Fadil (PKR)	518	8.85%	5,983	3,351	72.09%
2021	N25 Simunjan	Awla Dris (PBB)	4,276	73.02%	Saharuddin Abdullah (PBK)	137	2.34%	5,983	3,351	72.09%
