= Royston Valentine =

Malaysian politician

Yang Berhormat Royston Valentine MLA
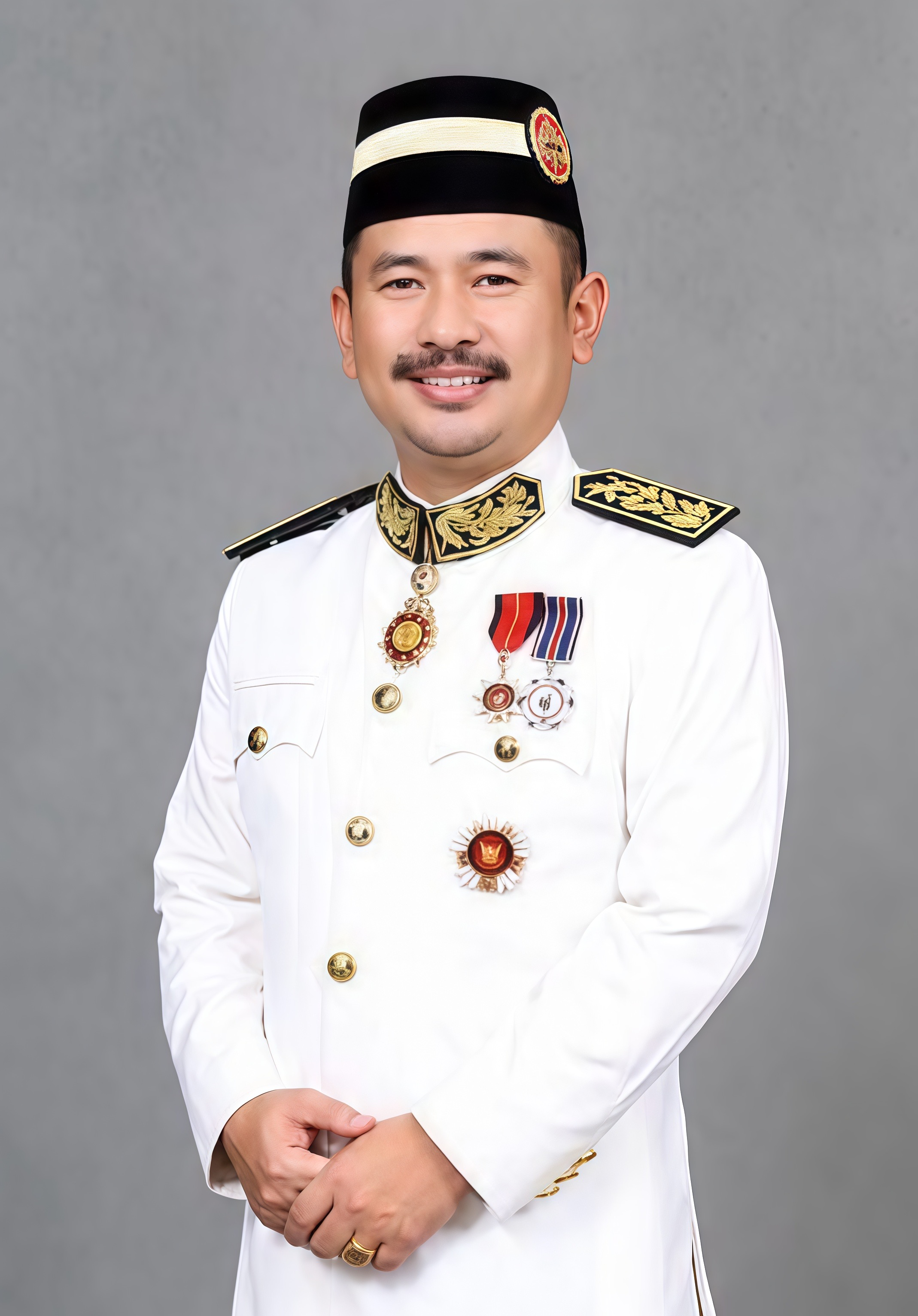

Member of the Sarawak State Legislative Assembly for Tellian
- Incumbent
- Assumed office 2021
- Preceded by: Yussibnosh Balo

Personal details
- Born: Royston bin Valentine; 28 November 1986 (age 39) Sarawak
- Citizenship: Malaysian
- Party: PBB
- Other political affiliations: Gabungan Parti Sarawak
- Spouse: Menz Gonzalez
- Occupation: Politician

Royston bin Valentine is a Malaysian politician from PBB. He has served as the Member of the Sarawak State Legislative Assembly for Tellian since 2021.

== Election results ==
Sarawak State Legislative Assembly
Year	Constituency	Candidate	Votes	Pct.	Opponent(s)	Votes	Pct.	Ballots cast	Majority	Turnout
2021	N57 Tellian	Royston Valentine (PBB)	4,282	70.10%	Sait Junaidi (PSB)	1,365	22.35%	6,205	2,917	61.69%
2021	N57 Tellian	Royston Valentine (PBB)	4,282	70.10%	Mohd Arwin Abdullah (PKR)	287	4.70%	6,205	2,917	61.69%
2021	N57 Tellian	Royston Valentine (PBB)	4,282	70.10%	Zainuddin Budug (PBK)	174	2.85%	6,205	2,917	61.69%
