= Jefferson Jamit Unyat =

Malaysian politician

Yang Berhormat Datuk Jefferson Jamit Unyat PGBK JBS KMN MLA

Member of the Sarawak State Legislative Assembly for Bukit Goram
- Incumbent
- Assumed office 2016
- Preceded by: Constituency created

Personal details
- Born: Jefferson Jamit anak Unyat Sarawak
- Citizenship: Malaysian
- Party: PBB
- Other political affiliations: Barisan Nasional (till 2018); Gabungan Parti Sarawak (since 2018)
- Occupation: Politician

Jefferson Jamit anak Unyat is a Malaysian politician from PBB. He has served as the Member of the Sarawak State Legislative Assembly for Bukit Goram since 2016.

== Election results ==
Sarawak State Legislative Assembly
Year	Constituency	Candidate	Votes	Pct.	Opponent(s)	Votes	Pct.	Ballots cast	Majority	Turnout
2016	N63 Bukit Goram	Jefferson Jamit Unyat (PBB)	4,596	69.57%	Larry Asap (DAP)	2,010	30.43%	6,762	2,586	58.75%
2021	N63 Bukit Goram	Jefferson Jamit Unyat (PBB)	4,253	68.45%	Joseph Jinggut (DAP)	715	11.51%	6,380	3,538	52.51%
2021	N63 Bukit Goram	Jefferson Jamit Unyat (PBB)	4,253	68.45%	Robert Segie (PSB)	689	11.09%	6,380	3,538	52.51%
2021	N63 Bukit Goram	Jefferson Jamit Unyat (PBB)	4,253	68.45%	Puso Bujang (PBK)	297	4.78%	6,380	3,538	52.51%
2021	N63 Bukit Goram	Jefferson Jamit Unyat (PBB)	4,253	68.45%	Robert Saweng (PBDS Baru)	259	4.17%	6,380	3,538	52.51%

== Honours ==
- Malaysia
  - Officer of the Order of the Defender of the Realm (KMN) (2015)
- Sarawak
  - Commander of the Order of the Star of Hornbill Sarawak (PGBK) – Datuk (2023)
  - Companion of the Most Exalted Order of the Star of Sarawak (JBS) (2020)
