= Mohd Chee Kadir =

Malaysian politician

Yang Berhormat Dato Mohd Chee Kadir MLA PSBS
- محمد چه کادير

Member of the Sarawak State Legislative Assembly for Kabong
- Incumbent
- Assumed office 2016
- Preceded by: Constituency created

Personal details
- Born: Mohd Chee bin Kadir Sarawak
- Citizenship: Malaysian
- Party: PBB
- Other political affiliations: Gabungan Parti Sarawak
- Spouse: Meryani Yassin
- Education: International Islamic University Malaysia; Thames Valley University
- Occupation: Politician
- Profession: Lawyer

Mohd Chee bin Kadir is a Malaysian politician from PBB. He has served as the Member of the Sarawak State Legislative Assembly for Kabong since 2016.

== Election results ==
Sarawak State Legislative Assembly
Year	Constituency	Candidate	Votes	Pct.	Opponent(s)	Votes	Pct.	Ballots cast	Majority	Turnout
2016	N40 Kabong	Mohd Chee Kadir (PBB)	5,069	77.35%	Jini Sahini (AMANAH)	1,484	22.65%	6,708	3,585	72.23%
2021	N40 Kabong	Mohd Chee Kadir (PBB)	4,789	67.32%	Wan Mohamad Madehi Wan Ali (PSB)	2,026	28.48%	7,234	2,763	71.55%
2021	N40 Kabong	Mohd Chee Kadir (PBB)	4,789	67.32%	Mohd Asri Kasim (PBK)	208	2.92%	7,234	2,763	71.55%
2021	N40 Kabong	Mohd Chee Kadir (PBB)	4,789	67.32%	Hud Andri Zulkarnain (AMANAH)	91	1.28%	7,234	2,763	71.55%

== Honours ==
- Sarawak :
  - Commander of the Most Exalted Order of the Star of Sarawak (PSBS) – Dato (2024)
