= Dayang Noorazah Awang Sohor =

Malaysian politician

Yang Berhormat Dayang Noorazah Awang Sohor MLA
- دايڠ نوورازاه اوڠ سوهور

Member of the Sarawak State Legislative Assembly for Lingga
- Incumbent
- Assumed office 2021
- Preceded by: Simoi Peri

Personal details
- Born: Dayang Noorazah binti Awang Sohor; 1988 (age 37–38) Sarawak
- Citizenship: Malaysian
- Party: PBB
- Other political affiliations: Gabungan Parti Sarawak
- Education: Swinburne University of Technology
- Occupation: Politician

Dayang Noorazah binti Awang Sohor is a Malaysian politician from PBB. She has served as the Member of the Sarawak State Legislative Assembly for Lingga since 2021.

== Election result ==
Sarawak State Legislative Assembly
| Year | Constituency | Candidate | Votes | Pct. | Opponent(s) | Votes | Pct. | Ballots cast | Majority | Turnout |
|---|---|---|---|---|---|---|---|---|---|---|
| 2021 | N28 Lingga | Dayang Noorazah Awang Sohor (PBB) | 3,700 | 58.10% | Wan Abdillah Edruce Wan Abdul Rahman (PSB) | 1,427 | 22.41% | 6,368 | 2,273 | 66.51% |
| 2021 | N28 Lingga | Dayang Noorazah Awang Sohor (PBB) | 3,700 | 58.10% | Mohd Sepian Abang Daud (IND) | 880 | 13.82% | 6,368 | 2,273 | 66.51% |
| 2021 | N28 Lingga | Dayang Noorazah Awang Sohor (PBB) | 3,700 | 58.10% | Baha Imam (PBK) | 139 | 2.19% | 6,368 | 2,273 | 66.51% |
| 2021 | N28 Lingga | Dayang Noorazah Awang Sohor (PBB) | 3,700 | 58.10% | Abang Kassim Abg Bujang (PKR) | 130 | 2.04% | 6,368 | 2,273 | 66.51% |
| 2021 | N28 Lingga | Dayang Noorazah Awang Sohor (PBB) | 3,700 | 58.10% | Abang Ahmad Abang Suni (SEDAR) | 92 | 1.44% | 6,368 | 2,273 | 66.51% |
