= John Ilus =

Malaysian politician

Yang Berhormat John Ilus MLA

Member of the Sarawak State Legislative Assembly for Bukit Semuja
- Incumbent
- Assumed office 2016
- Preceded by: Constituency created

Personal details
- Born: John anak Ilus Sarawak
- Citizenship: Malaysian
- Party: PBB
- Other political affiliations: Barisan Nasional (till 2018); Gabungan Parti Sarawak (since 2018)
- Occupation: Politician

John anak Ilus is a Malaysian politician from PBB. He has served as the Member of the Sarawak State Legislative Assembly for Bukit Semuja since 2016.

== Election results ==
Sarawak State Legislative Assembly
Year	Constituency	Candidate	Votes	Pct.	Opponent(s)	Votes	Pct.	Ballots cast	Majority	Turnout
2016	N23 Bukit Semuja	John Ilus (PBB)	5,451	59.64%	Edward Andrew Luwak (DAP)	2,307	25.24%	9,452	3,144	70.72%
2016	N23 Bukit Semuja	John Ilus (PBB)	5,451	59.64%	Frederick Bayoi Manggie (IND)	1,196	13.09%	9,452	3,144	70.72%
2016	N23 Bukit Semuja	John Ilus (PBB)	5,451	59.64%	Cobbold Lusoi (PBDS Baru)	133	1.46%	9,452	3,144	70.72%
2016	N23 Bukit Semuja	John Ilus (PBB)	5,451	59.64%	Johnny Bob Aput (STAR)	53	0.58%	9,452	3,144	70.72%
2021	N23 Bukit Semuja	John Ilus (PBB)	6,113	70.06%	Elsiy Tingang (PSB)	1,408	16.14%	8,923	4,705	59.91%
2021	N23 Bukit Semuja	John Ilus (PBB)	6,113	70.06%	Brolin Nicholsion (DAP)	777	8.91%	8,923	4,705	59.91%
2021	N23 Bukit Semuja	John Ilus (PBB)	6,113	70.06%	Edward Andrew Luwak (PBK)	427	4.89%	8,923	4,705	59.91%
