= Chong Chieng Jen =

Malaysian politician and lawyer

Yang Berhormat Tuan Chong Chieng Jen MP MLA
- 张健仁
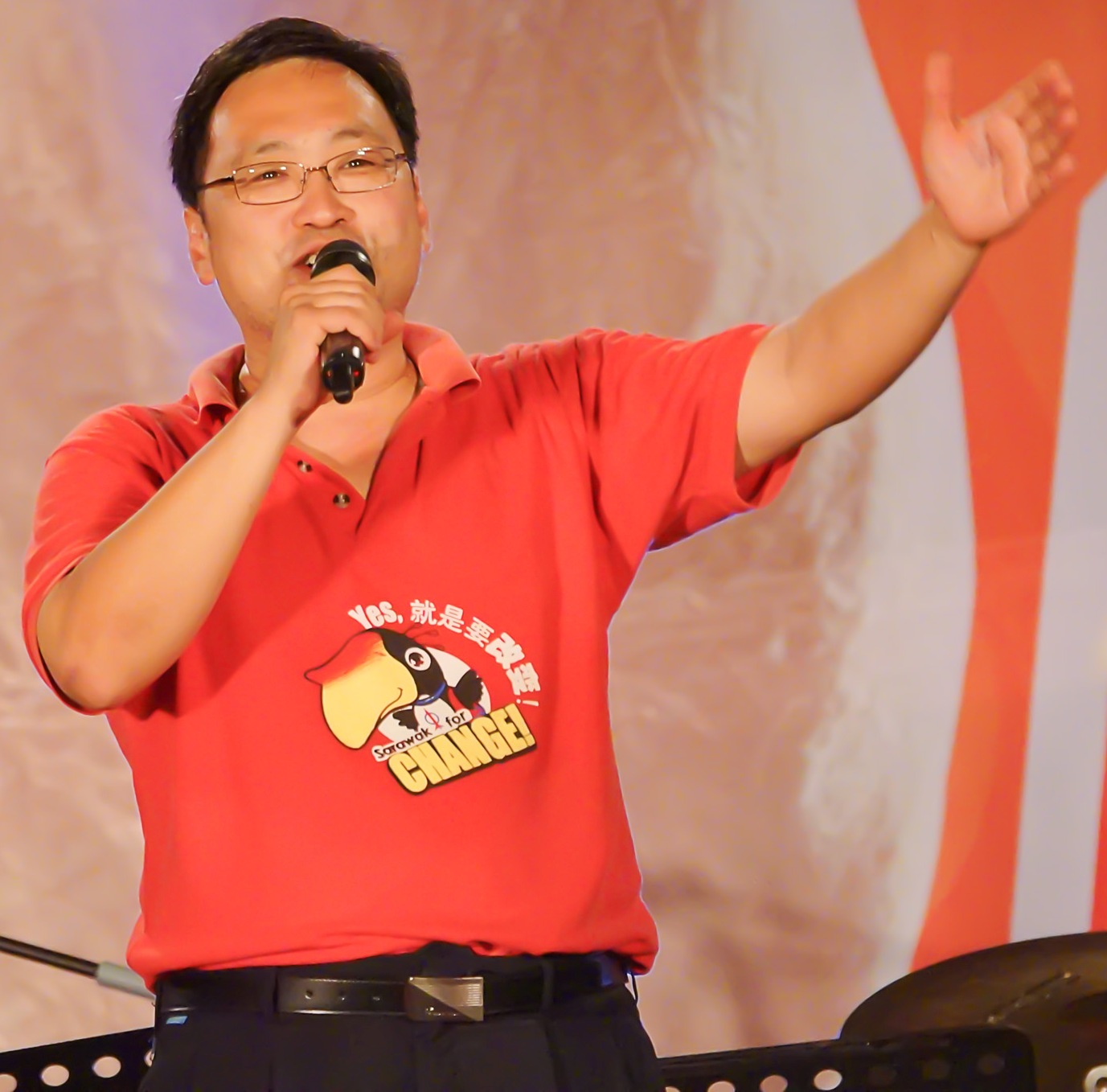
- Chong in 2013

Chairman of the National Institute of Occupational Safety and Health
- Incumbent
- Assumed office 19 February 2024
- Minister: Steven Sim Chee Keong
- Deputy: Manivannan Gowindasamy
- Preceded by: Wilson Ugak Kumbong

State Leader of the Opposition of Sarawak
- Incumbent
- Assumed office 19 March 2024
- Governor: Wan Junaidi Tuanku Jaafar
- Premier: Abang Abdul Rahman Zohari
- Preceded by: Wong Soon Koh
- Constituency: Padungan
- In office 10 June 2013 – 8 November 2020
- Governor: Abdul Taib Mahmud
- Chief Minister: Adenan Satem (2013–2017); Abang Abdul Rahman Johari (2017–2020)
- Preceded by: Wong Ho Leng
- Succeeded by: Wong Soon Koh
- Constituency: Kota Sentosa

Deputy Minister of Domestic Trade and Consumer Affairs
- In office 2 July 2018 – 24 February 2020
- Monarchs: Muhammad V (2018–2019); Abdullah (2019–2020)
- Prime Minister: Mahathir Mohamad
- Minister: Saifuddin Nasution Ismail
- Preceded by: Henry Sum Agong (Deputy Minister of Domestic Trade, Co-operatives and Consumerism)
- Succeeded by: Rosol Wahid
- Constituency: Stampin

Member of the Malaysian Parliament for Stampin
- Incumbent
- Assumed office 9 May 2018
- Preceded by: Julian Tan Kok Ping (PR–DAP)
- Majority: 14,221 (2018); 7,158 (2022)

Member of the Malaysian Parliament for Bandar Kuching
- In office 21 March 2004 – 9 May 2018
- Preceded by: Song Swee Guan (BN–SUPP)
- Succeeded by: Kelvin Yii Lee Wuen (PH–DAP)
- Majority: 2,041 (2004); 9,952 (2008); 19,642 (2013)

Member of the Sarawak State Legislative Assembly for Padungan
- Incumbent
- Assumed office 18 December 2021
- Preceded by: Wong King Wei (PH–DAP)
- Majority: 1,198 (2021)

Member of the Sarawak State Legislative Assembly for Kota Sentosa
- In office 20 May 2006 – 18 December 2021
- Preceded by: Position established
- Succeeded by: Wilfred Yap Yau Sin (GPS–SUPP)
- Majority: 531 (2006); 4,824 (2011); 2,819 (2016)

State Chairman of Pakatan Harapan of Sarawak
- Incumbent
- Assumed office 30 August 2017
- National Chairman: Mahathir Mohamad (2017–2020); Anwar Ibrahim (since 2020)
- Preceded by: Himself

National Vice Chairman of the Democratic Action Party
- Incumbent
- Assumed office 16 December 2012 Serving with: Chow Kon Yeow (2012–2025) &; M. Kulasegaran (2012–2025) &; Tengku Zulpuri Shah Raja Puji (2017–2022) &; Nga Kor Ming (2022–2025) &; Teresa Kok Suh Sim (2022–2025) &; Teo Nie Ching (since 2025) &; Ng Suee Lim (since 2025) &; Syahredzan Johan (since 2025) &; Arul Kumar Jambunathan (since 2025)
- National Chairman: Karpal Singh (2012–2014); Tan Kok Wai (2014–2022); Lim Guan Eng (2022–2025); Gobind Singh Deo (since 2025)
- Secretary-General: Lim Guan Eng (2012–2022); Anthony Loke Siew Fook (since 2022)

State Chairman of the Democratic Action Party of Sarawak
- Incumbent
- Assumed office 10 June 2013
- Deputy: David Wong Kee Woan; Alice Lau Kiong Yieng
- Secretary-General: Lim Guan Eng (2013–2022); Anthony Loke Siew Fook (since 2022)
- Preceded by: Wong Ho Leng

4th Parliamentary Leader of the Democratic Action Party
- Incumbent
- Assumed office 23 June 2025
- National Chairman: Gobind Singh Deo
- Secretary-General: Anthony Loke Siew Fook
- Preceded by: Nga Kor Ming

Personal details
- Born: Chong Chieng Jen; 12 February 1971 (age 55) Kuching, Sarawak, Malaysia
- Party: Democratic Action Party (DAP)
- Other political affiliations: Barisan Alternatif (BA) (1999–2004); Pakatan Rakyat (PR) (2008–2015); Pakatan Harapan (PH) (since 2015)
- Spouse: Tan Hui Poh
- Relations: Chong Siew Chang (father); Sim Yaw Sik (mother)
- Children: 2 daughters; 1 son
- Education: Australian National University
- Occupation: Politician
- Profession: Lawyer
- Website: chiengjen.blogspot.com

Chong Chieng Jen (simplified Chinese: 张健仁; traditional Chinese: 張健仁; pinyin: Zhāng Jiànrén; Pe̍h-ōe-jī: Tiuⁿ Kiān-jîn; Pha̍k-fa-sṳ: Chông Khien-ìn, born 12 February 1971), is a Malaysian politician and lawyer who has served as Chairman of the National Institute of Occupational Safety and Health (NIOSH) since February 2024, State Leader of the Opposition of Sarawak from June 2013 to November 2020 and again since March 2024, Member of Parliament (MP) for Stampin since May 2018 and Member of the Sarawak State Legislative Assembly (MLA) for Padungan since December 2021. He served as the Deputy Minister of Domestic Trade and Consumer Affairs in the Pakatan Harapan (PH) administration under former Prime Minister Mahathir Mohamad and former Minister Saifuddin Nasution Ismail from July 2018 to the collapse of the PH administration in February 2020, MP for Bandar Kuching from March 2004 to May 2018 and MLA for Kota Sentosa from May 2006 to December 2021. He is a member, National Vice Chairman, State Chairman of Sarawak, Branch Chairman of Bandar Kuching and State Youth Advisor of Sarawak as well as Bandar Kuching of the Democratic Action Party (DAP), a component party of the PH and formerly Pakatan Rakyat (PR) and Barisan Alternatif (BA) coalitions.

== Early life and education ==
Chong started his primary education in SJK(C) Methodist (Methodist Chinese National Primary School), Sibu. He continued his Primary 3 to 5 education at Kuching's SJK(C) Chung Hua No. 3 (Chung Hua No. 3 Chinese National Primary School), and Primary 6 at SRK St. Theresa Padungan (St. Theresa Padungan National Primary School), Kuching. Chong later undertook his secondary education in SMK St. Joseph, Kuching (St. Joseph, Kuching National Secondary School) and Saint Patrick's School, Singapore. He was admitted into Victoria Junior College, one of the top junior colleges in Singapore.

Chong pursued his tertiary studies at the Australian National University, Canberra and graduated with a Bachelor of Commerce, majoring in accounting & economics, and Bachelor of Laws.

== Legal career ==
He works as an advocate in Kuching and is attached to the legal firm Messrs Chong Brothers Advocates.

== Political career ==
Chong first took part in the 10th Malaysian general election, contesting for the Bandar Kuching parliamentary seat as a DAP candidate but lost to Sarawak United People's Party (SUPP) candidate, Song Swee Guan. In the following 10th Sarawak state election, he contested for the Padungan state seat, eventually losing out to Lily Yong Lee Lee, also a SUPP candidate.

In the 11th Malaysian general election, Chong was elected as MP for Bandar Kuching with a 2,041 majority vote, and later, Sarawak state assemblyman for the newly created seat of Kota Sentosa in following the results of the 11th Sarawak state election.

Chong defended his parliamentary seat in the 12th Malaysian general election with an increased majority. In 2011, he once again, he defended his state seat, this time against Yap Chin Loi, with a majority vote of 4,824.

On 17 December 2012, during the DAP 16th National Congress, Chong was among seven DAP leaders appointed to the party's Central Executive Committee (CEC). On 5 May 2013, he contested for the Bandar Kuching parliamentary seat for the final time in the 13th Malaysian general election and retained the seat with an even larger majority of 19,642 against SUPP's Tan Kai.

On 7 May 2016, during the 11th Sarawak state election, Chong retained his Kota Sentosa state seat with a majority vote of 2,819 against Yap Yau Sin. On 12 November 2017, during the DAP Central Executive Committee (CEC) re-election, Chong was re-elected as one of the party's five national vice-chairperson.

Following incumbent Stampin MP Julian Tan Kok Ping's decision to retire from politics, Chong moved to contest the Stampin parliamentary seat against SUPP president Sim Kui Hian in the 14th Malaysian general election (GE14) on 9 May 2018, which was seen as a 'grey' or unsafe seat following redelineation by the Election Commission (EC). His special assistant, Kelvin Yii Lee Wuen, contested for the Bandar Kuching seat. Chong went on to win with a majority vote of 14,221. Following the historic events of the GE14 which saw the first-ever change in the Government of Malaysia and end of six decades of National Front (BN) rule, on 2 July 2018, Chong was sworn-in as Deputy Minister of Domestic Trade and Consumer Affairs of Malaysia by the Yang di-Pertuan Agong (King of Malaysia).

In the 12th Sarawak state election, Chong's special assistant, Michael Kong Feng Nian was selected to contest in Kota Sentosa whereas Chong went on to contest in the Padungan state seat against the mayor of Kuching South, Datuk Wee Hong Seng. Chong went on to win the Padungan state seat with a majority of 1,198.

== Issues raised ==
In 2009, Chong issued a statement claiming that the Sarawak finance minister controlled 80% of the development fund. Chong was later suspended from the state assembly for contempt of the House.

In 2013, Chong alleged that RM 11 billion of Sarawak state funds had disappeared into a "black hole". The Sarawak government and the Sarawak financial authority then sued Chong for defamation. In 2022, the High Court of Sarawak ruled that Chong had defamed the Sarawak government and ordered him to pay RM 150,000 in damages. In 2026, Chong failed in his bid to appeal the decision in the Court of Appeal, and the damages to be paid were increased to RM 300,000. The Court of Appeal has decided that a Malaysian government entity has the right to sue its citizens. Chong decided to appeal against the ruling in the Malaysian federal court because the court decision is against the public interest. He argued that other Commonwealth countries that adhered to the common law hold that a governmental entity has no right to sue its citizens.

During a state assembly sitting in November 2013, Chong said that "Over these years I have observed the member from Satok (Abang Johari Openg). He is a gentleman but recently I think there is a change of behaviour ... demeanour resembling an UMNO politician in Parliament." Chong was ordered to withdraw the remark, but he only agreed on the condition that the assembly adopts a motion of barring UMNO, a right-wing political party based in the Peninsular Malaysia from entering Sarawak. The assembly eventually suspended Chong.

In November 2016, Chong tried to file a motion against Sarawak's chief minister, Adenan Satem, over allegations of misappropriating RM 250 million from minor rural projects. Chong refused to withdraw the allegation and was suspended for the rest of the assembly sitting.

In March 2018, the federal Pakatan Harapan (PH) opposition coalition unveiled a manifesto that promised to increase the oil royalty payment to 20% for Sarawak and Sabah, with a return of up to 50 percent of the tax revenue collected in both the states to be spent on development needs. In April 2018, Chong, as the chairman of the Sarawak PH opposition coalition, offered an agreement that promised 20% oil royalty and 50% return of tax collected together with devolution of autonomies such as healtcare and education to the Sarawak government if the former wins the federal power in 2018 Malaysian general election, however, Sarawak refused to sign it because it has no legal standing. In September 2019, prime minister Mahathir of the PH coalition stated that payment of 20% oil royalty is not possible for Sabah and Sarawak because it may compromise financial status of Petronas. In response to the statement by Mahathir, a colleague of Chong, Wong King Wei claimed that the 20% oil royalty will only be given to Sarawak if the Sarawak agreed to assume the responsibilities in healthcare and education matters. In a court case in July 2022, Violet Yong, a colleague of Chong, disagreed that the execution of the promise rests in the hands of the federal cabinet. She said the PH coalition might take a different approach than the former Barisan Nasional government in implementing the promise. She also claimed that the agreement had received the consent of PH coalition parties at both the state and federal levels. She insisted that the promise was not met because the Sarawak state government did not sign the deal.

In July 2023, Chong described the RM 30 million 99-metre Sarawak flagpole, which was the nation's tallest flagpole at that time, as a symbol of extravagance and lack of accountability and "with RM30 million, you can build three schools that can cater to more than 1,000 students per school". Chief political secretary of Sarawak premier replied that the cost of the flagpole include other amenities such as an English Tea House and a water cascading feature. In December 2023, the Sarawak premier stated that the Malaysian national oil company Petronas and Sarawak oil company Petros funded the erection of this flagpole as part of the corporate social responsibility (CSR). In 2026, another state in Malaysia named Selangor constructed a taller 120-metre flagpole at RM 8.5 million. The special assistant to Chong, Michael Kong, claimed that a 99-metre flagpole ranged from RM5.59 million to RM6.45 million based on professional engineers’ estimates.

In January 2026, Chong mooted an idea of giving away a 30% stake in Petronas to Sarawak to resolve the gas aggregator rights dispute between Petronas (own by Malaysian federal government) to Petros (owned by Sarawak state government).

Since August 2026, Chong has questioned the rationale of the Sarawak government paying RM 70 million for the dry lease of the Falcon 8X private jet that was valued at RM 40 million without an open tender, and the government does not own the plane after the 5-year rental period. Deputy Premier Douglas Uggah Embas replied that the government selected the company based on the company’s aviation support experience and established procurement procedures.

In October 2026, Chong urged the Sarawak state government to scrap the building of new Kuching international airport, halt the ongoing Autonomous Rapid Transit (ART) construction project and scrap the construction of deep sea port at Tanjung Embang due to overspending concerns.

Chong was suspended from the state assembly sitting on 15 October 2026 for misleading the House by questioning the reliability of the Sarawak budget document because of a pagination error and for insulting another state assemblyman (Kota Sentosa) by saying, "..., something criminal is being committed ..."

== Election results ==
Parliament of Malaysia
Year	Constituency	Candidate	Votes	Pct	Opponent(s)	Votes	Pct	Ballots cast	Majority	Turnout
1999	P169 Bandar Kuching	Chong Chieng Jen (DAP)	5,913	17.39%	Song Swee Guan (SUPP)	18,239	53.64%	34,693	8,389	63.06%
1999	P169 Bandar Kuching	Chong Chieng Jen (DAP)	5,913	17.39%	Dominique Ng Kim Ho (IND)	9,850	28.97%	34,693	8,389	63.06%
2004	P195 Bandar Kuching	Chong Chieng Jen (DAP)	17,914	53.02%	Wee Kok Tiong (SUPP)	15,873	46.98%	34,693	2,041	63.06%
2008	P195 Bandar Kuching	Chong Chieng Jen (DAP)	22,901	63.88%	Sim Yaw Yen (SUPP)	12,949	36.12%	36,257	9,952	68.13%
2013	P195 Bandar Kuching	Chong Chieng Jen (DAP)	30,133	74.18%	Tan Kai (SUPP)	10,491	25.82%	40,879	19,642	76.64%
2018	P196 Stampin	Chong Chieng Jen (DAP)	33,060	63.70%	Sim Kui Hian (SUPP)	18,839	36.30%	52,550	14,221	79.33%
2022	P196 Stampin	Chong Chieng Jen (DAP)	39,310	53.30%	Lo Khere Chiang (SUPP)	32,152	43.59%	73,759	7,158	60.95%
2022	P196 Stampin	Chong Chieng Jen (DAP)	39,310	53.30%	Lue Cheng Hing (PSB)	2,291	3.11%	73,759	7,158	60.95%

Sarawak State Legislative Assembly
Year	Constituency	Candidate	Votes	Pct	Opponent(s)	Votes	Pct	Ballots cast	Majority	Turnout
2001	N08 Padungan	Chong Chieng Jen (DAP)	7,369	46.73%	Lily Yong Lee Lee (SUPP)	8,402	53.27%	16,259	1,033	65.10%
2006	N12 Kota Sentosa	Chong Chieng Jen (DAP)	6,579	52.10%	Yap Chin Loi (SUPP)	6,048	47.90%	12,846	531	67.84%
2011	N12 Kota Sentosa	Chong Chieng Jen (DAP)	12,594	61.84%	Yap Chin Loi (SUPP)	7,770	38.16%	20,589	4,824	75.41%
2016	N12 Kota Sentosa	Chong Chieng Jen (DAP)	10,047	58.16%	Wilfred Yap Yau Sin (SUPP)	7,228	41.84%	17,495	2,819	67.91%
2021	N09 Padungan	Chong Chieng Jen (DAP)	4,686	50.40%	Wee Hong Seng (SUPP)	3,488	37.52%	9,297	1,198	44.94%
2021	N09 Padungan	Chong Chieng Jen (DAP)	4,686	50.40%	Raymond Thong Ee Yu (PBK)	930	10.00%	9,297	1,198	44.94%
2021	N09 Padungan	Chong Chieng Jen (DAP)	4,686	50.40%	Soo Lina (ASPIRASI)	193	2.08%	9,297	1,198	44.94%

== Honours ==
=== Honours of Malaysia ===
- Malaysia
  - Recipient of the 17th Yang di-Pertuan Agong Installation Medal (2025)
