= Miro Simuh =

Malaysian politician

Yang Berhormat Miro Simuh MLA AMN

Member of the Sarawak State Legislative Assembly for Serembu
- Incumbent
- Assumed office 2016
- Preceded by: Constituency created

Personal details
- Born: Miro anak Simuh Sarawak
- Citizenship: Malaysian
- Party: PBB
- Other political affiliations: Barisan Nasional (till 2018); Gabungan Parti Sarawak (since 2018)
- Occupation: Politician

Miro anak Simuhis a Malaysian politician from PBB. He has served as the Member of the Sarawak State Legislative Assembly for Serembu since 2016.

== Political career ==
Miro served as Chief of PBB Youth Wing from 2022 to 2025.

== Election results ==
Sarawak State Legislative Assembly
Year	Constituency	Candidate	Votes	Pct.	Opponent(s)	Votes	Pct.	Ballots cast	Majority	Turnout
2016	N18 Serembu	Miro Simuh (PBB)	3,452	50.43%	Nyomek Nyeap (IND)	2,055	30.02%	7,002	1,397	77.24%
2016	N18 Serembu	Miro Simuh (PBB)	3,452	50.43%	Athina Klaywa Sim (PKR)	1,218	17.79%	7,002	1,397	77.24%
2016	N18 Serembu	Miro Simuh (PBB)	3,452	50.43%	Buln Patrick Ribos (STAR)	120	1.75%	7,002	1,397	77.24%
2021	N18 Serembu	Miro Simuh (PBB)	4,068	57.69%	Iana Akam (PSB)	2,418	34.29	7,155	1,650	72.76%
2021	N18 Serembu	Miro Simuh (PBB)	4,068	57.69%	Jecky Misieng (PBK)	257	3.64%	7,155	1,650	72.76%
2021	N18 Serembu	Miro Simuh (PBB)	4,068	57.69%	Micahel Sawing (PKR)	217	3.08%	7,155	1,650	72.76%
2021	N18 Serembu	Miro Simuh (PBB)	4,068	57.69%	Buln Ribos (ASPIRASI)	92	1.30%	7,155	1,650	72.76%

== Honours ==
- Malaysia :
  - Member of the Order of the Defender of the Realm (AMN) (2017)
