= Wilfred Yap Yau Sin =

Malaysian politician

Yang Berhormat Wilfred Yap Yau Sin MLA KMN
- 叶耀星

Member of the Sarawak State Legislative Assembly for Kota Sentosa
- Incumbent
- Assumed office 2021
- Preceded by: Chong Chieng Jen

Personal details
- Born: 18 October 1966 (age 59) Kuching, Sarawak
- Citizenship: Malaysian
- Party: SUPP
- Other political affiliations: Barisan Nasional (till 2018); Gabungan Parti Sarawak (since 2018)
- Occupation: Politician
- Profession: Lawyer

Wilfred Yap Yau Sin is a Malaysian politician from SUPP. He has served as the Member of the Sarawak State Legislative Assembly for Kota Sentosa since 2021.

== Election results ==
Sarawak State Legislative Assembly
| Year | Constituency | Candidate | Votes | Pct. | Opponent(s) | Votes | Pct. | Ballots cast | Majority | Turnout |
|---|---|---|---|---|---|---|---|---|---|---|
| 2016 | N12 Kota Sentosa | Wilfred Yap Yau Sin (SUPP) | 7,228 | 41.84% | Chong Chieng Jen (DAP) | 10,047 | 58.16% | 17,495 | 2,819 | 67.91% |
| 2021 | N12 Kota Sentosa | Wilfred Yap Yau Sin (SUPP) | 5,806 | 43.05% | Michael Kong Feng Nian (DAP) | 4,123 | 30.57% | 13,698 | 1,683 | 48.25% |
| 2021 | N12 Kota Sentosa | Wilfred Yap Yau Sin (SUPP) | 5,806 | 43.05% | Lau Pang Heng (PSB) | 2,328 | 17.26% | 13,698 | 1,683 | 48.25% |
| 2021 | N12 Kota Sentosa | Wilfred Yap Yau Sin (SUPP) | 5,806 | 43.05% | Lue Cheng Hing (PBK) | 1,015 | 7.53% | 13,698 | 1,683 | 48.25% |
| 2021 | N12 Kota Sentosa | Wilfred Yap Yau Sin (SUPP) | 5,806 | 43.05% | Tan Kok Chiang (ASPIRASI) | 215 | 1.59% | 13,698 | 1,683 | 48.25% |

== Honours ==
- Malaysia :
  - Officer of the Order of the Defender of the Realm (KMN) (2021)
