= Hamzah Brahim =

Malaysian politician

Yang Berhormat Datuk Hamzah Brahim PMW AMN MLA

Political Secretary to Minister of Energy Transition and Water Transformation
- Incumbent
- Assumed office 27 January 2023
- Prime Minister: Anwar Ibrahim
- Minister: Fadillah Yusof

Political Secretary to Minister of Plantation and Commodities
- In office 2022–2023
- Prime Minister: Anwar Ibrahim
- Minister: Fadillah Yusof

Member of the Sarawak State Legislative Assembly for Stakan
- Incumbent
- Assumed office 18 December 2021
- Preceded by: Mohd Ali Mahmud (BN–PBB)
- Majority: 5,807 (2021)

Personal details
- Party: Parti Pesaka Bumiputera Bersatu (PBB)
- Other political affiliations: Barisan Nasional (BN) (–2018); Gabungan Parti Sarawak (GPS) (2018–present)
- Occupation: Politician

Hamzah bin Brahim is a Malaysian politician who served as Political Secretary to Minister of Energy Transition and Water Transformation Fadillah Yusof since January 2023 and Minister of Plantation and Commodities from 2022 to 2023 as well as Member of the Sarawak State Legislative Assembly (MLA) for Stakan since December 2021.

== Political career ==
Hamzah Brahim elected as Stakan assemblyman in 2021 Sarawak state election. In 2022, he was served as Political Secretary to Minister of Plantation and Commodities and in 2023 he served as Political Secretary to Minister of Energy Transition and Water Transformation.

== Election results ==
Sarawak State Legislative Assembly
Year	Constituency	Candidate	Votes	Pct	Opponent(s)	Votes	Pct	Ballots cast	Majority	Turnout
2021	N17 Stakan	Hamzah Brahim (PBB)	7,854	72.45%	George Young Si Ricord Junior (PSB）	2,047	18.88%	11,070	5,807	65.15%
2021	N17 Stakan	Hamzah Brahim (PBB)	7,854	72.45%	Leslie Ting Xiang Zhi (DAP)	524	4.83%	11,070	5,807	65.15%
2021	N17 Stakan	Hamzah Brahim (PBB)	7,854	72.45%	Atet Dego (PBK)	415	3.83%	11,070	5,807	65.15%

== Honours ==
- Malaysia
  - Member of the Order of the Defender of the Realm (AMN) (2013)
- Federal Territory (Malaysia)
  - Commander of the Order of the Territorial Crown (PMW) – Datuk (2021)
