= Safiee Ahmad (Sarawak politician) =

Malaysian politician

Yang Berhormat Safiee Ahmad JBK MLA
- سافي أحمد

Member of the Sarawak State Legislative Assembly for Daro
- Incumbent
- Assumed office 2016
- Preceded by: Murni Suhaili

Personal details
- Born: Safiee bin Ahmad Sarawak
- Citizenship: Malaysian
- Party: PBB
- Other political affiliations: Barisan Nasional (till 2018); Gabungan Parti Sarawak (since 2018)
- Spouse: Robiah Tajudin
- Education: Universiti Utara Malaysia; Universiti Kebangsaan Malaysia
- Occupation: Politician

Safiee bin Ahmad is a Malaysian politician from PBB. He has served as the Member of the Sarawak State Legislative Assembly for Daro since 2016.

== Election results ==
Sarawak State Legislative Assembly
Year	Constituency	Candidate	Votes	Pct.	Opponent(s)	Votes	Pct.	Ballots cast	Majority	Turnout
2016	N43 Daro	Safiee Ahmad (PBB)	5,001	89.78%	Ibrahim Bayau (AMANAH)	569	10.22%	5,734	4,432	67.53%
2021	N43 Daro	Safiee Ahmad (PBB)	5,317	93.18%	Jamaludin Ibrahim (IND)	205	3.59%	5,830	5,112	63.40%
2021	N43 Daro	Safiee Ahmad (PBB)	5,317	93.18%	Ting Ing Hua (PBK)	184	3.22%	5,830	5,112	63.40%

== Honours ==
- Sarawak
  - Companion of the Order of the Star of Hornbill Sarawak (JBK) (2020)
