= Majang Renggi =

Malaysian politician

Yang Berhormat Datuk Dato Majang Renggi MLA PSBS KMN

Deputy Minister for Infrastructure and Port Development
- Incumbent
- Assumed office 2022 Serving with Aidel Lariwoo
- Minister: Douglas Uggah Embas
- Governor: Abdul Taib Mahmud (2022-2024); Wan Junaidi Tuanku Jaafar (since 2024)
- Premier: Abang Johari
- Preceded by: Position established

Member of the Sarawak State Legislative Assembly for Samalaju
- Incumbent
- Assumed office 2016
- Preceded by: Constituency created

Personal details
- Born: Majang anak Renggi Sarawak
- Citizenship: Malaysian
- Party: PRS
- Other political affiliations: Barisan Nasional (till 2018); Gabungan Parti Sarawak (since 2018)
- Spouse: Evelyn Hasan
- Occupation: Politician

Majang anak Renggi is a Malaysian politician from PRS. He has served as the Member of the Sarawak State Legislative Assembly for Samalaju since 2016. He is also the Sarawak Deputy Minister for Infrastructure and Port Development.

== Political career ==
Majang is the Deputy President of PRS.

== Election results ==
Sarawak State Legislative Assembly
Year	Constituency	Candidate	Votes	Pct.	Opponent(s)	Votes	Pct.	Ballots cast	Majority	Turnout
2016	N70 Samalaju	Majang Renggi (PRS)	5,456	61.34%	Baba Emperan (DAP)	2,992	33.64%	9,026	2,464	68.12%
2016	N70 Samalaju	Majang Renggi (PRS)	5,456	61.34%	Zharudin Narudin (PAS)	447	5.03%	9,026	2,464	68.12%
2021	N70 Samalaju	Majang Renggi (PRS)	7,547	67.05%	Tony Ung (DAP)	1,504	13.36%	11,451	6,042	63.68%
2021	N70 Samalaju	Majang Renggi (PRS)	7,547	67.05%	Reggie Suel (PSB)	1,496	13.29%	11,451	6,042	63.68%
2021	N70 Samalaju	Majang Renggi (PRS)	7,547	67.05%	Leighton Manjah (PBK)	509	4.52%	11,451	6,042	63.68%
2021	N70 Samalaju	Majang Renggi (PRS)	7,547	67.05%	Baba Emperan (PBDS Baru)	199	1.77%	11,451	6,042	63.68%

== Honours ==
- Malaysia :
  - Officer of the Order of the Defender of the Realm (KMN) (2021)
- Sarawak :
  - Commander of the Most Exalted Order of the Star of Sarawak (PSBS) – Dato (2021)
