= Paulus Palu Gumbang =

Malaysian politician

Yang Berhormat Paulus Palu Gumbang MLA AMN

Member of the Sarawak State Legislative Assembly for Batu Danau
- Incumbent
- Assumed office 2006
- Preceded by: Constituency created

Personal details
- Born: Paulus Palu anak Gumbang; 29 August 1951 (age 74) Sarawak
- Citizenship: Malaysian
- Party: SPDP (till 2013); TERAS (2013-2016); PBB (since 2016)
- Other political affiliations: Barisan Nasional (till 2013, 2016–2018); Gabungan Parti Sarawak (since 2018)
- Occupation: Politician

Paulus Palu anak Gumbang is a Malaysian politician from PBB. He has served as the Member of the Sarawak State Legislative Assembly for Batu Danau since 2006.

== Election results ==
Sarawak State Legislative Assembly
| Year | Constituency | Candidate | Votes | Pct. | Opponent(s) | Votes | Pct. | Ballots cast | Majority | Turnout |
|---|---|---|---|---|---|---|---|---|---|---|
| 2006 | N69 Batu Danau | Paulus Palu Gumbang (SPDP) | 2,961 | 63.54% | Christopher Sawan Jiram (SNAP) | 1,699 | 36.46% | 4,745 | 1,262 | 68.87% |
| 2011 | N69 Batu Danau | Paulus Palu Gumbang (SPDP) | 3,667 | 71.13% | Lau Liak Koi (PKR) | 1,348 | 26.15% | 5,227 | 2,319 | 68.45% |
| 2011 | N69 Batu Danau | Paulus Palu Gumbang (SPDP) | 3,667 | 71.13% | Lawrence Cosmas Sunang Simpang (SNAP) | 140 | 2.72% | 5,227 | 2,319 | 68.45% |
| 2016 | N80 Batu Danau | Paulus Palu Gumbang (BN Direct) | 4,366 | 75.37% | Ali Adap (IND) | 1,427 | 24.63% | 5,909 | 2,939 | 68.26% |
| 2021 | N80 Batu Danau | Paulus Palu Gumbang (PBB) | 3,030 | 53.14% | Ali Adap (PSB) | 2,324 | 40.76% | 5,792 | 706 | 61.78% |
| 2021 | N80 Batu Danau | Paulus Palu Gumbang (PBB) | 3,030 | 53.14% | Racha Balang (PKR) | 268 | 4.70% | 5,792 | 706 | 61.78% |
| 2021 | N80 Batu Danau | Paulus Palu Gumbang (PBB) | 3,030 | 53.14% | Petrus Bulan (PBK) | 80 | 1.40% | 5,792 | 706 | 61.78% |

== Honours ==
- Malaysia :
  - Member of the Order of the Defender of the Realm (AMN) (1999)
