= 2004 Ba'kelalan by-election =

← 2001	18 September 2004	2006 →

Ba'kelalan seat in the Sarawak State Legislative Assembly
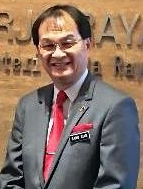
	BN
Candidate	Nelson Balang Rining	Baru Bian
Party	BN (SPDP)	Independent
Popular vote	2,843	1,391
Percentage	67.2%	32.9%
Ba'kelalan assemblyman before election
Dr Judson Sakai Tagal
BN
Elected Ba'kelalan assemblyman
Nelson Balang Rining
BN

The Ba'kelalan by-election was a by-election for the seat of Ba'kelalan state constituency in the Sarawak State Legislative Assembly. The seat fell vacant after the death if its incumbent member, Dr Judson Sakai Tagal in a helicopter crash at Mount Murud. The seat was defended for Barisan Nasional (BN) coalition government by Nelson Balang Rining of the Sarawak Progressive Democratic Party (SPDP), while an independent politician Baru Bian contested against BN in a straight one-to-one fight.

At the time of the election, there were 7,976 voters, a majority of whom were the Lun Bawang and Kelabit people. Since the creation of the constituency in 1995, the incumbent Dr Judson Sakai Tagal won the seat for two consecutive terms uncontested. This is the first time that the Ba'kelalan residents are able to exercise their rights to vote since the creation of the constituency. The seat has been won continuously by BN since the constituency creation.

In this by-election, Nelson Balang Rining successfully defended the seat at a 1,452 majority. Baru Bian, who only decided to contest within 24 hours of the nomination day was able to garner 1,391 votes although he was widely believed to have lost deposit (garner less than 1/8 of the total votes cast) before the polling day.

== Background and history ==
The Ba'kelalan state constituency has various ethnic groups which can be grouped under Orang Ulu people ("upriver people"). The Lun Bawang and the Kelabit people forms the majority of the ethnic groups here. The Ba'kelalan state constituency was formally part of the Lawas state constituency. In 1995, Ba'kelalan state constituency was separated from Lawas during a delineation exercise. At the time of the by-election, there were a total of 7,976 eligible voters with 70% of them were Kelabits or Lun Bawang, 1.2% Chinese, 0.8 percent Bidayuh, 0.9% Malay/Melanau, and 0.1% other ethnic groups. Since the creation of the constituency in 1995, the Ba'kelalan residents never voted before because the incumbent Dr Judson Sakai Tagal, won uncontested for two consecutive terms in 1996 and 2001 state elections. Therefore, this by-election was the first time that residents was able to exercise their voting rights since the creation of the constituency.

Ba'kelalan is situated deep in the interior of Sarawak bordering Indonesian Kalimantan. Therefore, the only convenient mode of access is by air.

== Nomination of candidates ==
Nomination of candidates have become an issue in this election. Firstly, the Sarawak BN coalition has nominated several names, followed by another few names by the Sarawak Progressive Democratic Party (SPDP) leaders, and several names from the grassroots (people of Ba'kelalan). Meanwhile, other Sarawak BN component parties such as Parti Pesaka Bumiputera Bersatu (PBB) and Parti Bansa Dayak Sarawak (PBDS) decided to rally behind any BN candidate being nominated. The state BN chairman, Abdul Taib Mahmud, preferred Nelson Balang, Judson Sakai's political secretary and SPDP youth chief, because he is familiar with the area and its people. On the other hand, SPDP president William Mawam Ikom, has his own list of candidates. The list did not include Nelsong Balang but choose Bob Baru, a Miri based dentist because has high education background and well-liked by the Ba'kelalan community. Besides, SPDP also suggested another candidate, Roland Mattu as a possible candidate. However, BN top leadership did not favour Bob Baru because he has a strong Christian background which could be affecting the state political scene dominated by Muslim Melanau. Finally, SPDP succumb to the choice of the top leadership in Sarawak BN.

With rumours spreading that BN would win the by-election on the nomination day, a Lun Bawang lawyer based in Kuching named Baru Bian unexpectedly offered himself as an independent candidate to campaign against BN on the day before the nomination day. Baru was a Parti Bansa Dayak Sarawak (PBDS) supreme council member. He resigned from PBDS and made a press statement that he would contest as an independent because PBDS, as a member of the BN coalition, cannot contest against each other. Unlike BN, Baru Bian relied on his previous record on defending Native Customary Rights (NCR) cases against property developers in court. He is well known in the Lun Bawang community because of his strong principles and exceptional faith. Baru Bian decided to contest in the last minute because of requests by certain Ba'kelalan residents to represent them. He also noted that a considerable number of the Ba'kelalan residents did not favour Nelson Balang. Baru previously contested against PBB's Awang Tengah Ali Hassan at Lawas constituency under PBDS ticket but lost. Baru Bian is the cousin of Nelson Balang. Baru was also a senior pastor of Borneo Evangelical Mission (BEM) church.

Another independent candidate named Wilson Lio Apoi also expressed interests in contesting in this election. He claimed that he obtained support from Bario and Lawas. However, his nominating paper was rejected by returning officer. Other candidates such as Frank Samuel Agong, and Mohamed Brahim also had their nomination papers rejected due to technical errors. Sarawak National Party (SNAP) was an opposition party. It declined to reveal its own list of possible candidates. The party then decided to withdraw from contesting in this by-election a few days before the nomination day. Meanwhile, Sarawak Democratic Action Party (DAP) refused to involve in this by-election. Sarawak DAP chairman Wong Ho Leng opined that a different kind of voice is needed to break the BN dominance in Sarawak politics.

== Election campaign issues ==
=== Barisan Nasional ===
Sarawak BN has always been campaigning on the platform of developing Ba'kelalan and improve the region's socioeconomic status. The BN candidate Nelson Balang stated that he will continue to bring development to Ba'kelalan. This includes better electricity, water supply, and roads to the constituents. Alfred Jabu Numpang, the Sarawak deputy chief minister told the Ba'kelalan voters that only BN can bring to development to them. Meanwhile, a senior minister in the Sarawak cabinet Awang Tengah Ali Hassan stated that an independent candidate will not be able to bring any changes to Ba'kelalan. Under previous state assemblyman Judson Sakai, Ba'kelalan had slightly better road access and electricity supply although the some road sare still inaccessible by small vehicles. BN also hired four-wheel drives to bring voters to polling stations.

BN also announced that they Ba'kelalan would be developed as a tourism destination. Meanwhile, Awang Tengah announced that a RM 76 million water supply project would be implemented soon in this region.

=== Baru Bian ===
On the other hand, Baru Bian viewed development in terms of both mental and spiritual developments. He clarify that he was not totally against BN in this election as he was providing alternative voice for the people. This was because Nelson Belong was not well accepted by the Ba'kelalan constituents. He also stressed that land rights and land acquisitions are both important in the development of Ba'kelalan. As a devout Christian, Baru also had a chance to influence those who are sympathetic to his religious outlook. Baru said that:

We stand to defend our right to decide who we want, for all the good that God had taught us, for honesty and intergrity. This is more important in our teaching that material wealth and possession. Our faith had taught us man shall not live by bread alone.

— by Baru Bian

== Results ==
There were 56% of the voters participated in this election. As expected, Nelson Balang won the election with a majority of 1,452 votes. In terms of percentage, Nelson obtained 67% of the votes while Baru Bian obtained 36%. Older voters tend to vote for BN for more developments in Ba'kelalan while younger voters opted for Baru Bian because of his academic qualifications and championing of native customary rights. The Kelabit people voted for Nelson Balang while Lun Bawang people voted for Baru Bian. Areas such as Limbang, Bario, and Medamit are known to vote for Nelson Balang while the people from the interior of Ba'kelalan such as Long Tuma, Long Tuping, and Long Sebangang voted for Baru Bian. Baru Bian won in 32 polling stations in the lowland regions of the constituency while Nelson Balang won in the highland villages of Ba'kelalan and Bario.

Sarawak state by-election, 18 September 2004: Ba'kelalan Upon the death of incumbent, Judson Sakai Tagal
Party	Candidate	Votes	%	∆%
BN	Nelson Balang Rining	2,843	67.15	
Independent	Baru Bian	1,391	32.85	
Total valid votes		4,234	100.00	
Total rejected ballots		79		
Unreturned ballots				
Turnout		4,313	56.04	
Registered electors		7,696		
Majority		1,452		
BN hold		Swing		{{{2}}}

== Aftermath ==
After the by-election, Nelson Balang vowed to continue Dr Judson Sakai's legacy in developing Ba'kelalan. Meanwhile, Baru Bian accepted his defeat. He said he will continue to defend native land rights. Baru was also willing to contest the seat again in the coming 2006 state election. Baru also reminded BN on finding the cause on why there is considerable number of voters not supporting BN. He also hoped that BN will help to alleviate the socio-economic and infrastructure problems in Ba'kelalan. Baru also congratulated his cousin after the election.

Prime minister Abdullah Ahmad Badawi thanked the voters and congratulated Sarawak chief minister Abdul Taib Mahmud for winning the by-election. Malaysian deputy prime minister Najib Razak said that Barisan win was expected because the people already expressed their wish for more development.
