= Francis Harden Hollis =

Malaysian politician

Yang Berhormat Datuk Francis Harden Hollis MLA PGBK
- Incumbent
- Assumed office 2021
- Preceded by: Michael Pilo Gangga

Deputy Minister for Education, Innovation and Talent Development
- Incumbent
- Assumed office 2022 Serving with Annuar Rapaee
- Governor: Abdul Taib Mahmud (2022-2024); Wan Junaidi Tuanku Jaafar (since 2024)
- Premier: Abang Johari
- Preceded by: Position established

Personal details
- Born: Francis Harden anak Hollis; 25 August 1956 (age 69) Sarawak
- Citizenship: Malaysian
- Party: SUPP
- Other political affiliations: Barisan Nasional (till 2018); Gabungan Parti Sarawak (since 2018)
- Spouse: Simba Nalang
- Occupation: Politician

Francis Harden anak Hollis is a Malaysian politician from SUPP. He has served as the Member of the Sarawak State Legislative Assembly for Simanggang since 1996. He is also the Sarawak Deputy Minister for Education, Innovation and Talent Development.

== Political career ==
Francis is also the Treasurer of SUPP.

== Election results ==
Sarawak State Legislative Assembly
| Year | Constituency | Candidate | Votes | Pct. | Opponent(s) | Votes | Pct. | Ballots cast | Majority | Turnout |
|---|---|---|---|---|---|---|---|---|---|---|
| 1996 | N23 Simanggang | Francis Harden Hollis (SUPP) | 8,215 | 86.55% | Othman Abdullah (IND) | 1,277 | 13.45% | 9,928 | 6,938 | 64.12% |
| 2001 | N23 Simanggang | Francis Harden Hollis (SUPP) | 8,408 | 85.38% | Asem Mansor (IND) | 1,440 | 14.62% | 10,195 | 6,968 | 64.11% |
| 2006 | N27 Simanggang | Francis Harden Hollis (SUPP) | 5,144 | 85.31% | Peli Aron (SNAP) | 886 | 14.69% | 6,249 | 4,258 | 63.44% |
| 2011 | N27 Simanggang | Francis Harden Hollis (SUPP) | 4,758 | 67.31% | Leon Jimat Donald (DAP) | 2,311 | 32.69% | 7,171 | 2,447 | 68.37% |
| 2016 | N32 Simanggang | Francis Harden Hollis (SUPP) | 4,094 | 50.70% | Ngu Piew Seng (IND) | 2,706 | 33.51% | 8,205 | 1,388 | 71.52% |
| 2016 | N32 Simanggang | Francis Harden Hollis (SUPP) | 4,094 | 50.70% | Leon Jimat Donald (DAP) | 695 | 8.61% | 8,205 | 1,388 | 71.52% |
| 2016 | N32 Simanggang | Francis Harden Hollis (SUPP) | 4,094 | 50.70% | Norina Umoi Utot (PKR) | 580 | 7.18% | 8,205 | 1,388 | 71.52% |
| 2021 | N32 Simanggang | Francis Harden Hollis (SUPP) | 3,954 | 48.94% | Wilson Entabang (PSB) | 3,779 | 46.77% | 8,234 | 175 | 62.27% |
| 2021 | N32 Simanggang | Francis Harden Hollis (SUPP) | 3,954 | 48.94% | Leon Jimat Donald (DAP) | 212 | 2.62% | 8,234 | 175 | 62.27% |
| 2021 | N32 Simanggang | Francis Harden Hollis (SUPP) | 3,954 | 48.94% | Peli Aron (PBK) | 135 | 1.67% | 8,234 | 175 | 62.27% |

== Honours ==
- Sarawak :
  - Commander of the Order of the Star of Hornbill Sarawak (PGBK) – Datuk (2008)
