= Tarat (state constituency) =

State constituency in Sarawak, Malaysia

Tarat (N20)
Sarawak constituency

State constituency
- Legislature: Sarawak State Legislative Assembly
MLA
Vacant
- Constituency created: 1968
- First contested: 1969
- Last contested: 2026

Tarat is a state constituency in Sarawak, Malaysia, that has been represented in the Sarawak State Legislative Assembly since 1969.

The state constituency was created in the 1968 redistribution and is mandated to return a single member to the Sarawak State Legislative Assembly under the first past the post voting system.

== Demographics ==
Ethnic breakdown of Tarat's electorate as of 2022
1. Sarawak bumiputera (65.5%)
2. Chinese (28.2%)
3. Malay-Muslim bumiputera (5.60%)
4. Other ethnicities (0.70%)

== History ==
As of 2020, Tarat has a population of 25,806 people.

=== Polling districts ===
According to the gazette issued on 31 October 2022, the Tarat constituency has a total of 33 polling districts.

State constituency	Polling Districts	Code	Location
Tarat（N20）	Tijirak	198/20/01	SK St. Elizabeth Tijirak
Tarat（N20）	Petung	198/20/02	SK Patung
Tarat（N20）	Tabuan Rabak	198/20/03	Balai Raya Tabuan Rabak
Tarat（N20）	Simpuk	198/20/04	SK St. Peter Simpuk
Tarat（N20）	Sekuduk	198/20/05	SK Swithun Payang
Tarat（N20）	Panchor	198/20/06	SK St. Ambrose Kpg. Panchor
Tarat（N20）	Pekan Tarat	198/20/07	SJK (C) Chung Hua Batu 35
Tarat（N20）	Baki	198/20/08	SJK (C) Chung Hua Batu 32
Tarat（N20）	Ampungan	198/20/09	SK St. Alban Ampungan
Tarat（N20）	Tapah	198/20/10	SJK (C) Tapah
Tarat（N20）	Mundai	198/20/11	SK St. Mathew Mundai
Tarat（N20）	Beratok	198/20/12	SJK (C) Beratok
Tarat（N20）	Pesang	198/20/13	SK Pesang Begu; Dewan Serbaguna Kpg. Serumah
Tarat（N20）	Gayu	198/20/14	SK Kpg. Gayu
Tarat（N20）	Sarig	198/20/15	Balai Raya Kpg. Sarig
Tarat（N20）	Sira	198/20/16	Balai Raya Kpg. Sira
Tarat（N20）	Teng Bungkap	198/20/17	Balai Raya Kpg. Krian
Tarat（N20）	Subang	198/20/18	Balai Raya Kpg. Subang
Tarat（N20）	Stabut	199/20/19	Balai Raya Kpg. Stabut
Tarat（N20）	Peraya	198/20/20	Balai Raya Kpg. Peraya
Tarat（N20）	Maang	198/20/21	SK St. Dunstan
Tarat（N20）	Merakep	198/20/22	SK St. James Rayang
Tarat（N20）	Bisira	198/20/23	Balai Raya Kpg. Bisira
Tarat（N20）	Dunuk	198/20/24	SK Pelaman Sindunuk
Tarat（N20）	Semaru	198/20/25	Dewan Serbaguna Kpg. Semaru
Tarat（N20）	Belimbing	198/20/26	SK St. Edward Belimbing
Tarat（N20）	Retoh	198/20/27	SK Rituh
Tarat（N20）	Sungai Barie	198/20/28	Balai Raya Kpg. Entawa Sg. Barie; SK Sg. Kenyah
Tarat（N20）	Tarat Baru	198/20/29	SK Tarat
Tarat（N20）	Munggu Lalang	198/20/30	SK St. Bernabas Baru
Tarat（N20）	Rayang	198/20/31	SK Rayang
Tarat（N20）	Sebemban	198/20/32	SK Sebemban
Tarat（N20）	Tanah Puteh	198/20/33	SK Tanah Puteh; RH Panjang, Kpg. Munggu Kopi

=== Representation history ===
Members of the Legislative Assembly for Tarat
Assembly	No	Years	Member	Party
Constituency created
8th	N11	1970-1974	Nelson Kundai Ngareng	SNAP
9th	N11	1974-1979	Arthur Mading	BN (PBB)
10th	N11	1979-1983	Robert Jacob Ridu	BN (PBB)
11th	N11	1983-1987	Robert Jacob Ridu	BN (PBB)
12th	N11	1987-1991	Frederick Bayoi Manggie	BN (PBB)
13th	N14	1991-1996	Frederick Bayoi Manggie	BN (PBB)
14th	N15	1996-2001	Roland Sagah Wee Inn	BN (PBB)
15th	N15	2001-2006	Roland Sagah Wee Inn	BN (PBB)
16th	N17	2006-2011	Roland Sagah Wee Inn	BN (PBB)
17th	N17	2011-2016	Roland Sagah Wee Inn	BN (PBB)
18th	N20	2016-2018	Roland Sagah Wee Inn	BN (PBB)
18th	N20	2018-2021	Roland Sagah Wee Inn	GPS (PBB)
19th	N20	2021–2026	Roland Sagah Wee Inn	GPS (PBB)

== Election results ==
Sarawak state election, 2026
Party	Candidate	Votes	%	∆%
GPS				▲
PH				▲
Total valid votes				
Total rejected ballots				
Unreturned ballots				
Turnout				
Registered electors				
Majority				

Sarawak state election, 2021
Party	Candidate	Votes	%	∆%
GPS	Roland Sagah Wee Inn	6,500	60.25	▲60.25
PSB	Dadi Tiap Juul	1,492	13.83	▲13.83
PKR	Christo Michael	1,445	13.39	▼13.00
PBK	Edison Jamang	1,183	10.96	▲10.96
Independent	Bai Udin Dungak	169	1.57	▲1.57
Total valid votes		10,789	100.00	
Total rejected ballots		262		
Unreturned ballots		54		
Turnout		11,105	62.68	▼8.99
Registered electors		17,717		
Majority		5,008	46.42	▼0.81
GPS gain from BN		Swing		?
Source(s) https://lom.agc.gov.my/ilims/upload/portal/akta/outputp/1718688/PUB687.pdf

Sarawak state election, 2016
Party	Candidate	Votes	%	∆%
BN	Roland Sagah Wee Inn	8,450	73.61	▲17.20
PKR	Musa Ngog	3,029	26.39	▼12.12
Total valid votes		11,479	100.00	
Total rejected ballots		214		
Unreturned ballots		55		
Turnout		11,748	71.67	▲2.06
Registered electors		16,391		
Majority		5,421	47.22	▲29.32
BN hold		Swing		
Source(s) "Federal Government Gazette - Notice of Contested Election, State Legislative Assembly of the State of Sarawak [P.U. (B) 190/2016]" (PDF). Attorney General's Chambers of Malaysia. 25 April 2016. Archived from the original (PDF) on 2017-06-12. "Senarai Calon yang Disahkan Layak Bertanding Pilihan Raya Dewan Undangan Negeri ke-11". Election Commission of Malaysia. 25 April 2016. Archived from the original on 25 April 2016.

Sarawak state election, 2011
Party	Candidate	Votes	%	∆%
BN	Roland Sagah Wee Inn	6,287	56.41	▼12.85
PKR	Peter Ato Ana Mayau	4,292	38.51	▲38.51
SNAP	Ateng Jeros	567	5.08	▼25.66
Total valid votes		11,146	100.00	
Total rejected ballots		209		
Unreturned ballots		27		
Turnout		11,382	69.61	▲12.41
Registered electors		16,352		
Majority		1,995	17.90	▼20.63
BN hold		Swing		
Source(s) "Federal Government Gazette - Results of Contested Election and Statements of the Poll after the Official Addition of Votes Sarawak [P.U. (B) 245/2011]" (PDF). Attorney General's Chambers of Malaysia. 29 April 2011.

Sarawak state election, 2006
Party	Candidate	Votes	%	∆%
BN	Roland Sagah Wee Inn	5,854	69.26	▼10.37
SNAP	Alex Saben Nipong @ Nyipong	2,598	30.74	▲30.74
Total valid votes		8,452	100.00	
Total rejected ballots		216		
Unreturned ballots		10		
Turnout		8,678	57.20	▼7.34
Registered electors		15,171		
Majority		3,256	38.52	▼27.86
BN hold		Swing		

Sarawak state election, 2001
Party	Candidate	Votes	%	∆%
BN	Roland Sagah Wee Inn	7,555	79.63	▲79.63
Independent	Tusa Lo Tai Chai	1,268	13.36	▲13.36
Independent	Jeffrey Gugui Jiwan	665	7.01	▲7.01
Total valid votes		9,488	100.00	
Total rejected ballots		173		
Unreturned ballots		0		
Turnout		9,661	64.54	
Registered electors		14,968		
Majority		6,287	66.26	
BN hold		Swing		

Sarawak state election, 1996
Party	Candidate	Votes	%	∆%
On the nomination day, Roland Sagah Wee Inn won uncontested.
BN	Roland Sagah Wee Inn			
Total valid votes			100.00	
Total rejected ballots				
Unreturned ballots				
Turnout				
Registered electors		14,855		
Majority				
BN hold		Swing		

Sarawak state election, 1991
Party	Candidate	Votes	%	∆%
BN	Frederick Bayoi Manggie	4,615	50.63	▼3.09
PBDS	Peter Runin	3,969	43.54	▲1.53
NEGARA	Bujang Ngadan	532	5.84	▲5.84
Total valid votes		9,116	100.00	
Total rejected ballots		178		
Unreturned ballots		0		
Turnout		9,294	72.25	▼0.36
Registered electors		12,864		
Majority		646	7.09	▼4.62
BN hold		Swing		

Sarawak state election, 1987
Party	Candidate	Votes	%	∆%
BN	Frederick Bayoi Manggie	5,107	53.72	▲8.65
PBDS	Richard Riot Jaem	3,994	42.01	▲2.06
Independent	Lai Boon Luan	405	4.26	▲4.26
Total valid votes		9,506	100.00	
Total rejected ballots		176		
Unreturned ballots		0		
Turnout		9,682	72.61	▼1.08
Registered electors		13,344		
Majority		1,113	11.71	▲6.60
BN hold		Swing		
Source(s) https://github.com/TindakMalaysia/HISTORICAL-ELECTION-RESULTS/blob/main/1987-SARAWAK-STATE-ELECTIONS/SARAWAK_1987_DUN_RESULTS.csv

Sarawak state election, 1983
Party	Candidate	Votes	%	∆%
BN	Robert Jacob Ridu	3,950	45.07	▼22.02
Independent	Rahun Dabak	3,502	39.95	▲7.04
Independent	Chai Mok Shin	633	7.22	▲7.22
Independent	Narayanan Sachidanandan	574	6.55	▲6.55
Independent	Bangkik Kandong	105	1.20	▲1.20
Total valid votes		8,764	100.00	
Total rejected ballots		191		
Unreturned ballots		0		
Turnout		8,955	73.69	▲1.74
Registered electors		12,153		
Majority		448	5.11	▼29.07
BN hold		Swing		
Source(s) https://github.com/TindakMalaysia/HISTORICAL-ELECTION-RESULTS/blob/main/1983-SARAWAK-STATE-ELECTIONS/SARAWAK_1983_DUN_RESULTS.csv

Sarawak state election, 1979
Party	Candidate	Votes	%	∆%
BN	Robert Jacob Ridu	4,913	67.09	▲17.42
Parti Anak Jati Sarawak	Johnny Rueh	2,410	32.91	▲32.91
Total valid votes		7,323	100.00	
Total rejected ballots		322		
Unreturned ballots		0		
Turnout		7,645	71.95	▼8.25
Registered electors		10,626		
Majority		2,503	34.18	▲24.45
BN hold		Swing		
Source(s) https://github.com/TindakMalaysia/HISTORICAL-ELECTION-RESULTS/blob/main/1979-SARAWAK-STATE-ELECTIONS/SARAWAK_1979_DUN_RESULTS.csv

Sarawak state election, 1974
Party	Candidate	Votes	%	∆%
BN	Arthur Madeng	3,421	49.67	▲6.46
SNAP	Robert Bangkik Kandong	2,751	39.93	▼3.28
Parti Bisamah Sarawak	Lawrence Pohan	716	10.39	▲10.39
Total valid votes		6,888	100.00	
Total rejected ballots		981		
Unreturned ballots		0		
Turnout		7,869	80.20	▼9.34
Registered electors		9,812		
Majority		670	9.73	▼4.89
BN gain from SNAP		Swing		?
Source(s) https://github.com/TindakMalaysia/HISTORICAL-ELECTION-RESULTS/blob/main/1974-ELECTION-RESULTS/MALAYSIA_1974_DUN_RESULTS.csv

Sarawak state election, 1969
Party	Candidate	Votes	%
SNAP	Nelson Kundai Ngareng	3,160	43.21
SCA	Teo Kui Seng	2,091	28.59
SUPP	Nyadang Nador	2,062	28.20
Total valid votes		7,313	100.00
Total rejected ballots		392	
Unreturned ballots		0	
Turnout		7,705	89.54
Registered electors		8,605	
Majority		1,069	14.62
This was a new constituency created.
