= Baru Bian =

Malaysian politician and lawyer

Yang Berhormat Tuan Baru Bian MLA
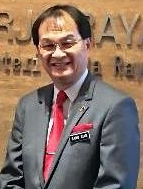
- Baru Bian as Minister of Works in 2019

Minister of Works
- In office 2 July 2018 – 24 February 2020
- Monarchs: Muhammad V (2018–2019); Abdullah (2019–2020)
- Prime Minister: Mahathir Mohamad
- Deputy: Mohd Anuar Mohd Tahir
- Preceded by: Fadillah Yusof
- Succeeded by: Fadillah Yusof
- Constituency: Selangau

Vice President of the Progressive Democratic Party
- Incumbent
- Assumed office 6 April 2024 Serving with Alexander Asing Sadai (Vice President I) & Friday Belik (Vice President II) & Roland Ting Hua Sing (Vice President III) & Johnical Rayong Ngipa
- President: Tiong King Sing

State Chairman of the People's Justice Party of Sarawak
- In office 15 December 2009 – 24 February 2020
- President: Wan Azizah Wan Ismail (2009–2018); Anwar Ibrahim (2018–2020)
- Deputy: Wan Zainal Wan Sanusi
- Preceded by: Anwar Ibrahim (Acting)
- Succeeded by: Larry Sng Wei Shien

Member of the Malaysian Parliament for Selangau
- In office 9 May 2018 – 19 November 2022
- Preceded by: Joseph Entulu Belaun (BN–PRS)
- Succeeded by: Edwin Banta (GPS–PRS)
- Majority: 486 (2018)

Member of the Sarawak State Legislative Assembly for Ba'kelalan
- Incumbent
- Assumed office 16 April 2011
- Preceded by: Nelson Balang Rining (BN–SPDP)
- Majority: 473 (2011); 538 (2016); 680 (2021)

Faction represented in Dewan Rakyat
- 2018–2020: Pakatan Harapan (PKR)
- 2020: Independent
- 2020–2022: Parti Sarawak Bersatu

Faction represented in Sarawak State Legislative Assembly
- 2011–2018: People's Justice Party
- 2018–2020: Pakatan Harapan
- 2020: Independent
- 2020–2024: Parti Sarawak Bersatu
- 2024–: Gabungan Parti Sarawak

Personal details
- Born: Baru Bian; 9 September 1958 (age 67) Lawas, Crown Colony of Sarawak (now Sarawak, Malaysia
- Citizenship: Malaysian
- Party: Parti Bansa Dayak Sarawak (PBDS) (1987–2004); Malaysian Dayak Congress (MDC) (2005); Sarawak National Party (SNAP) (2006–2008); People's Justice Party (PKR) (2008–2020); Parti Sarawak Bersatu (PSB) (2020–2024); Progressive Democratic Party (PDP) (since 2024)
- Other political affiliations: Pakatan Rakyat (PR) (2008–2015); Pakatan Harapan (PH) (2015–2020); Gabungan Parti Sarawak (GPS) (since 2024)
- Spouse: Yu Ching Sieu
- Education: Universiti Teknologi MARA; University of Melbourne; Malaysian Evangelical Theological Seminary (METS)
- Occupation: Politician
- Profession: Lawyer
- Website: www.barubian.net
- Baru Bian on Facebook; Baru Bian on Parliament of Malaysia

Baru Bian (born 9 September 1958) is a Malaysian politician and lawyer who has served as Member of the Sarawak State Legislative Assembly (MLA) for Ba'kelalan since April 2011. He served as the Minister of Works in the Pakatan Harapan (PH) administration under former Prime Minister Mahathir Mohamad from July 2018 to the collapse of the PH administration in February 2020 and the Member of Parliament (MP) for Selangau from May 2018 to November 2022. He is a member of the Progressive Democratic Party (PDP), a component party of the Gabungan Parti Sarawak (GPS) coalition and was a member of the Parti Sarawak Bersatu (PSB), People's Justice Party (PKR), a component party of the PH and formerly Pakatan Rakyat (PR) coalitions. He has also served as the Vice President of PDP since April 2024. He also served as the State Chairman of PKR of Sarawak from December 2009 to his resignation from the party in February 2020. He became the first ever federal minister of the Lun Bawang ethnicity in the Malaysian history.

== Early life and education ==
Baru Bian was born in an impoverished Lun Bawang family on 9 September 1958, to Bian Labo (father) and Takong Taie (mother) in Long Lopeng, Sarawak.The ancestry of Baru Bian can be traced back to Berunut area, near the Adang river, where the latter is the tributary of the Limbang River. All the genuine Lun Bawang people should be able to trace their ancestry to one single common ancestor named Terur Aco. Baru Bian and his six siblings are the twentieth generation since the first Lun Bawang. He is the third child and the eldest son in the family. Both Baru's parents were pastors. Baru's father, Bian Labo was trained at Lawas bible school which was under the Sidang Injil Borneo (SIB) church. Baru's family moved from one village to another because his father was posted to different villages every year. Brought up in a Christian family since childhood, Baru was taught of discipline and doing the right things by his father.

By the age of seven or eight, he followed his father into the jungle to learn hunting and fishing. As he became older, he would learn jungle survival skills, geography and boundary of the ancestral lands, and memorise twenty generations of ancestral names. He attended Primary 1 to 2 at Long Lellang (1966 to 1967), Primary 3 to 4 at Long Semado (1968-1969), and passed common entrance examination at Long Napir (1970 to 1971). After that, he attended Limbang secondary school until Form 5. At one point, he would need to wear modified school blouse left by her sister for the secondary school. He need to hike in the jungles for three days before reaching Lawas and another day journey to reach Limbang. His experiences during journeys through the jungles and mountain streams led him to understand the value of native customary rights (NCR) for pemakai menoa (territorial domain) and pulau galau (communal forest reserve) and also the environmental protection. During the year-end school holidays in 1980, Baru Bian interviewed his father and his uncle Lasong Labo about the history of their family's NCR land. He drew the boundaries of their NCR land and signed by the village headman. The map later proved to be useful in fighting against six logging companies encroaching their lands in Berunut from 1986 to 1990s.

He attended Kolej Tun Datu Tuanku Haji Bujang for Form 6 at Tanjong Lobang, Miri, Sarawak. He got a satisfactory result in GCE Ordinary Level examination. After completing his secondary education, he served as a temporary teacher at SMK Medamit, Limbang from 1979 to 1981. He taught geography, History, Physical Education and General Science there. His passion towards native land rights had led him pursued his tertiary education at Institut Teknology Mara (ITM), now Universiti Teknologi MARA (UiTM), Shah Alam, Selangor in Diploma in Law (DIL). His uncle, Libat Langub, who was a former student at ITM, encouraged him to study law there. He went to Melbourne to further his studies on Law in 1985. He applied for scholarship from ITM but was denied. Therefore, he decided to take a study loan instead. He subsequently obtained Bachelor of Laws (LL.B) from the University of Melbourne, Australia in 1986. After his graduation in Australia, Baru decided to come back to Malaysia to serve the needy instead of applying for permanent residency in Australia.

== Activism and legal career ==
Upon graduation, he became a trainee in a law firm named Rashid & Lee in Kuala Lumpur for six months before the law firm stopped paying allowances due to financial difficulties. He then continued his training at Eddy Chung & Co and was employed there until he returned to Kuching in 1988. Baru was subsequently admitted to the Malayan Bar as a lawyer and solicitor. By 1990, Baru became a partner in the firm of Messrs Anthony Ting, Baru Bian & Co. in Kuching, Sarawak. Baru taught himself about native customary rights (NCR) law through Sahabat Alam Malaysia (SAM), an NGO led by Harrison Ngau Laing, an environmentalist. Baru would later become a legal advisor for SAM. In the same year, he represented SAM to Yokohama, Japan to protest against the International Tropical Timber Organization (ITTO) for not including the issues of native customary rights in their report. It was also at this time that Baru Bian met the Swiss activist, Bruno Manser. Bruno would later help Baru to raise RM 30,000 from overseas supporters to fund Baru's 1991 election endeavour. However, Malaysian embassy officials would later take a photo of Baru Bian and Bruno Manser in Yokohama and used the photo to depict Baru as a traitor to Malaysian interests in 1991 election.

Baru filed his first NCR case in 1991 on behalf of his extended family whose ancestral lands in Berunut was encroached by logging companies. However, the case was pending in court after two years. Therefore, Baru and his family members took part in timber blockades which successfully led Samling, a logging company to compensate them RM 100,000. As part of the agreement, Baru withdrew the court case. He set up Messrs Baru Bian Advocates and Solicitors in Kuching in 1992. Baru would later found a legal partner named See Chee How. See is a human rights activist and a lawyer from Kuching. Together, they were involved in numerous native land rights cases. Baru also took up cases related to wrongful arrests or jailed without remand. In 2001, Baru Bian won the Rumah Nor Nyawai case in Sarawak High Court. This was the first time in the history of Malaysian courts that NCR rights was upheld. In 2007, the Federal Court of Malaysia upheld the decision on Rumah Nor Nyawai case that pemakai menua and pulau galau, in addition to temuda (cultivated land before 1 January 1958) are included in the definition of NCR land. In March 2011, Baru successfully led the legal defence team consisting of Civil Rights Lawyers See Chee How & Desmond Kho, resulting in the acquittal of Numpang Suntai who was accused of burning ten items of machinery in a logging camp at Sebangan, Simunjan District for encroaching the latter's ancestral land. By 2013, Baru Bian's law firm had processed more than 200 native land rights cases in court.

Baru's strong belief in the freedom of religion guaranteed by the Constitution of Malaysia had prompted him to take up cases for those who wished to leave the religion of Islam. His representations in the apostasy cases has drawn criticisms from Pan-Malaysian Islamic Party (PAS), accusing him of contempt against the Islamic religion. He has also been fighting regarding the rights by Christians of Sabah and Sarawak to carry on using the word Allah in the general practise of their Christian faith for generations.

Baru has been a popularly known activist and lawyer who had handled many ancestral lands as well as native customary rights cases and has strong support from churches notably SIB and Dayak community. As an Orang Ulu of Lun Bawang descent, Baru is seen as a hero and fighter especially within the interior Sarawak's Dayak community for his selfless contributions. Later as politician and even minister, Baru continue to champion better opportunities and provision of education and healthcare facilities in Sarawak and attempts to use the Sarawak Wealth Fund to ensure better development and wealth distribution among all Sarawakians.

== Political career ==
In 1987, Baru had joined Parti Bansa Dayak Sarawak (PBDS) at the beginning because the party was advocating NCR rights in Sarawak. In 1989, Baru was elected as PBDS Youth Executive Council member. Baru was also a supreme council member of PBDS. He first contested against Sarawak Barisan Nasional (BN) governing coalition at Lawas in 1991 but lost. After that, PBDS started negotiating to rejoin Sarawak BN in 1992 and was subsequently admitted into BN in 1994. One of the condition for PBDS to rejoin BN was to stop raising the NCR issues within the state government. However, Baru Bian decided to continue his pursue towards NCR rights cases in court. In September 2004, Baru decided to quit PBDS and went to contest against BN in Ba'kelalan by-election as an Independent but lost again. The already in leadership crisis PBDS was then deregister on 5 October 2004. Baru believed in continuing to uphold the NCR lands among the natives and the need to change the Sarawak state government in order to solve the NCR problems permanently. Baru later tried to join newly formed Malaysian Dayak Congress (MDC) to succeed PBDS but its registration never get to be approved for 2006 Sarawak state election, Baru chose to join Sarawak National Party (SNAP) instead to contest again the Ba'kelalan under SNAP ticket but had lost for the third time. He filed an election petition to Miri High Court on Barisan Nasional (BN)'s vote buying activities in Ba'kelalan but the petition was struck out on technicality grounds. He then decided to retire from politics temporary because he already lost three times in elections.

Following the 2008 Malaysian general election (GE12) which see the ruling coalition, BN's lose its two-thirds majority in the parliament and five states to the opposition since Malaysia's Independence. Baru decided to rejoin politics again to strengthen the two-party system and joined People's Justice Party (PKR) in April 2008, the same time of formation of new Pakatan Rakyat, as a reforms-hopeful informal coalition. In 2009, Baru was appointed as the chairman of PKR Sarawak. He then proceed to win the Ba'kelalan state constituency under PKR banner for the first time during 2011 Sarawak state election, having defeated the candidate for the BN coalition, Willie Liau, who is also his nephew, by a narrow 473-vote majority.

In 2013 Malaysian general election (GE13), Baru Bian decided to contest in Limbang parliamentary seat as PKR candidate. However, he was defeated by a huge margin against BN. In 2015, Sarawak chief minister Adenan Satem invited Baru to join BN, however, he declined the offer. Baru retained the seat in the 2016 Sarawak state election as PKR candidate with an increased majority of 538 votes, also against Willie.

During the 2018 Malaysian general election (GE14), NCR issues at Selangau prompted Baru to contest for the seat. He subsequently won the parliamentary seat against BN's Rita Sarimah with a majority of 486 votes. PKR successfully won four seats in Sarawak in GE14 then, pointing to the party newly gained grassroots support and a disunited split in BN's component parties, United Bumiputera Heritage Party (PBB) in Puncak Borneo, Sarawak United Peoples' Party (SUPP) in Miri; and also BN coalition's own disarrays in Saratok and Selangau. On 2 July 2018, Baru was sworn in as the Minister of Works of Malaysia at National Palace.

In 2020 Malaysian political crisis, Baru with 10 other PKR MPs led by Mohamed Azmin Ali decided to leave the party to support Malaysian United Indigenous Party (BERSATU) Prime Minister candidate Mahathir Mohamad to remain as the Prime Minister. However, after Mahathir resigns, BERSATU picked Muhyiddin for the Prime Minister position. Amidst PH also changed their support to Anwar Ibrahim from Mahathir for Prime Minister, Baru had turned Independent rather than follow Azmin's group, joining BERSATU to form the Perikatan Nasional (PN) government with Muhyiddin as Prime Minister, and be accused a hypocrite as well as opportunistic politician. In the aftermath, Baru had finally chosen to join the Sarawak-based United Sarawak Party (PSB) on 30 May 2020.

Baru has managed to retain the Ba'kelalan seat for the third term but as a PSB candidate in a 5 corner contest in the 2021 Sarawak state election.

== Personal life ==
=== Family ===
Baru met his current wife Yu Ching Sieu during his studies at Melbourne, Australia when he joined Overseas Christian Fellowship (OCF). Baru returned to Malaysia after graduation in 1986, Ching Sieu was still studying for another year for her double degree. She only returned to Malaysia in 1987. Baru and Ching Sieu was married on 17 December 1988. Baru and Ching Sieu raised three children, all three are now practicing Lawyers. Meanwhile, Ching Sieu is a full-time housewife.

He has six siblings and is the third child and the eldest son. His elder sisters are Mina and Serina. Freddie is his younger brother, followed by a sister named Sigang, a brother Paulus, and another sister named Litad. Baru's father died of stomach cancer in 1993 at the age of 62 and was buried at Miri.

=== Religion ===
Baru was baptised at Limbang River in 1973 by a New Zealand missionary named Murray Munroe. A few months before baptism, a testimony given by a former gangster from Singapore during an Inter-School Christian Fellowship (ISCF) meeting had strengthen Baru's belief in Christianity. Baru started to play guitar for Christian songs while he was a member of ISCF at SMK Limbang. He later become the president of ICSF during Form 4 and Form 5. He participated in Young Christian Students Movement (YCSM) year-end mission trips during his secondary school years. During his years at ITM, he attended Full Gospel Assembly Church service at Old Klang Road. He also attended a Christian Fellowship in ITM. When Baru studied at Melbourne, Australia, he attended Overseas Christian Fellowship (OCF).

=== Hobbies and interests ===
Baru learned Ngajat dance during his primary school years at Long Lellang. He is able to sing songs in alto since he was in Form 4. Baru also started to play football while he was in Form 6.

== Election results ==
Sarawak State Legislative Assembly
Year	Constituency	Candidate	Votes	Pct	Opponent(s)	Votes	Pct	Ballots cast	Majority	Turnout
1991	N56 Lawas	Baru Bian (PBDS)	2,433	28.59%	Tengah Ali Hassin (PBB)	6,076	71.41%	8,619	3,643	74.10%
2004	N62 Ba'kelalan	Baru Bian (IND)	1,391	32.85%	Nelson Balang Rining (SPDP)	2,843	67.15%	4,313	1,452	56.04%
2006	N70 Ba'kelalan	Baru Bian (SNAP)	1,589	43.50%	Nelson Balang Rining (SPDP)	2,064	56.50%	3,680	475	58.56%
2011	N70 Ba'kelalan	Baru Bian (PKR)	2,505	55.21%	Willie Liau (SPDP)	2,032	44.79%	4,585	473	65.90%
2016	N81 Ba'kelalan	Baru Bian (PKR)	2,858	55.20%	Willie Liau (SPDP)	2,320	44.80%	5,229	538	70.90%
2021	N81 Ba'kelalan	Baru Bian (PSB)	2,687	54.66%	Sam Laya (PDP)	2,007	40.83%	4,916	680	
2021	N81 Ba'kelalan	Baru Bian (PSB)	2,687	54.66%	Pita Asut @ Peter Asut (PBK)	110	2.24%	4,916	680	
2021	N81 Ba'kelalan	Baru Bian (PSB)	2,687	54.66%	Martin Labo (PKR)	57	1.16%	4,916	680	
2021	N81 Ba'kelalan	Baru Bian (PSB)	2,687	54.66%	Agnes Padan (IND)	55	1.12%	4,916	680	

Parliament of Malaysia
Year	Constituency	Candidate	Votes	Pct	Opponent(s)	Votes	Pct	Ballots cast	Majority	Turnout
2013	P221 Limbang	Baru Bian (PKR)	4,698	26.55%	Hasbi Habibollah (PBB)	12,999	73.45%	17,912	8,301	73.78%
2018	P214 Selangau	Baru Bian (PKR)	11,228	51.11%	Rita Sarimah Patrick Insol (PRS)	10,742	48.89%	22,352	486	74.44%
2022	P222 Lawas	Baru Bian (PSB)	5,684	31.22%	Henry Sum Agong (PBB)	11,361	62.40%	18,208	5,677	54.10%
2022	P222 Lawas	Baru Bian (PSB)	5,684	31.22%	Japar Suyut (PKR)	1,163	6.39%	18,208	5,677	54.10%

== Publications ==
Baru's memoir, The Long Awakening, coauthored with journalist Deborah Loh, chronicles the Sarawakian leader's personal and political life.

- Baru, Bian; Deborah, Loh (2014). The Long Awakening. Kuching, Sarawak: Baru Bian. ISBN 978-967-12316-0-9.
