= Simanggang (state constituency) =

State constituency in Sarawak, Malaysia

Simanggang (N32)
Sarawak constituency

State constituency
- Legislature: Sarawak State Legislative Assembly
MLA
Vacant
- Constituency created: 1968
- First contested: 1969
- Last contested: 2026

Simanggang is a state constituency in Sarawak, Malaysia, that has been represented in the Sarawak State Legislative Assembly from 1969 to 1979, from 1991 to present.

The state constituency was created in the 1968 redistribution and is mandated to return a single member to the Sarawak State Legislative Assembly under the first past the post voting system.

== Demographics ==
Ethnic breakdown of Simanggang's electorate as of 2022
1. Sarawak bumiputera (54.9%)
2. Chinese (30.9%)
3. Malay-Muslim bumiputera (13.5%)
4. Other ethnicities (0.70%)

== History ==
It was abolished in 1979 after it was redistributed. It was re-created in 1987.

As of 2020, Simanggang has a population of 29,026 people.

=== Polling districts ===
According to the gazette issued on 31 October 2022, the Simanggang constituency has a total of 7 polling districts.

State constituency	Polling Districts	Code	Location
Simanggang (N32)	Sabu	202/32/01	SK St. Lawrance
Simanggang (N32)	Simanggang	202/32/02	SK Abang Aing Sri Aman; SK Sri Aman; Dewan SMK Sri Aman
Simanggang (N32)	Lumanak Seberang	202/32/03	RH Thomas Lepong Empeliau; SJK (C) Chung Hua Simanggang
Simanggang (N32)	Munggu Sabun	202/32/04	Bangunan Perkumpulan Wanita
Simanggang (N32)	Sengat	202/32/05	RH Rengkang Lepong Empeliau; RH Lutang; SK Nangga Klassim Undop
Simanggang (N32)	Undup	202/32/06	RH Thomas Laman Sengkuang; RH Bandi Sebangkoi Undop; SK Batu Lintang Undop; SK Paku Undop; RH Pilit Kaong
Simanggang (N32)	Bayai	202/32/07	RH Empol Sg. Tenggak; Balai Raya RH Lichang, Kpg. Entawa, Undop; Bangunan Tabika KEMAS Kpg. Siga Jalan Paip, Undop

=== Representation history ===
Members of the Legislative Assembly for Simanggang
Assembly	No	Years	Member	Party
Constituency created
8th	N16	1970-1974	Nelson Liap Kudu	SNAP
9th	N16	1974-1979	Hollis Tini	BN (SUPP)
Constituency abolished, renamed to Sri Aman
Constituency re-created from Sri Aman
13th	N21	1991-1996	Michael Pilo Gangga	BN (SUPP)
14th	N23	1996-2001	Francis Harden Hollis	BN (SUPP)
15th	N23	2001-2006	Francis Harden Hollis	BN (SUPP)
16th	N27	2006-2011	Francis Harden Hollis	BN (SUPP)
17th	N27	2011-2016	Francis Harden Hollis	BN (SUPP)
18th	N32	2016-2018	Francis Harden Hollis	BN (SUPP)
18th	N32	2018-2021	Francis Harden Hollis	GPS (SUPP)
19th	N32	2021–2026	Francis Harden Hollis	GPS (SUPP)

== Election results ==
Sarawak state election, 2026
Party	Candidate	Votes	%	∆%
GPS				▲
PH				▲
Total valid votes				
Total rejected ballots				
Unreturned ballots				
Turnout				
Registered electors				
Majority				

Sarawak state election, 2021
Party	Candidate	Votes	%	∆%
GPS	Francis Harden Hollis	3,954	48.94	▲48.94
PSB	Wilson Entabang	3,779	46.77	▲46.77
DAP	Leon Jimat Donald	212	2.62	▼5.99
PBK	Peli Aron	135	1.67	▲1.67
Total valid votes		8,080	100.00	
Total rejected ballots		115		
Unreturned ballots		39		
Turnout		8,234	62.27	▼9.25
Registered electors		13,224		
Majority		175	2.17	▼15.02
GPS gain from BN		Swing		?
Source(s) https://lom.agc.gov.my/ilims/upload/portal/akta/outputp/1718688/PUB687.pdf

Sarawak state election, 2016
Party	Candidate	Votes	%	∆%
BN	Francis Harden Hollis	4,094	50.70	▼16.61
Independent	Ngu Piew Seng	2,706	33.51	▲33.51
DAP	Leon Jimat Donald	695	8.61	▼24.08
PKR	Norina Umoi Utot	580	7.18	▲7.18
Total valid votes		8,075	100.00	
Total rejected ballots		83		
Unreturned ballots		47		
Turnout		8,205	71.52	▲3.15
Registered electors		11,472		
Majority		1,388	17.19	▼17.42
BN hold		Swing		
Source(s) "Federal Government Gazette - Notice of Contested Election, State Legislative Assembly of the State of Sarawak [P.U. (B) 190/2016]" (PDF). Attorney General's Chambers of Malaysia. 25 April 2016. "Senarai Calon yang Disahkan Layak Bertanding Pilihan Raya Dewan Undangan Negeri ke-11". Election Commission of Malaysia. 25 April 2016. Archived from the original on 25 April 2016.

Sarawak state election, 2011
Party	Candidate	Votes	%	∆%
BN	Francis Harden Hollis	4,758	67.31	▼18.00
DAP	Leon Jimat Donald	2,311	32.69	▲32.69
Total valid votes		7,069	100.00	
Total rejected ballots		67		
Unreturned ballots		35		
Turnout		7,171	68.37	▲4.93
Registered electors		10,488		
Majority		2,447	34.62	▼36.00
BN hold		Swing		
Source(s) "Federal Government Gazette - Results of Contested Election and Statements of the Poll after the Official Addition of Votes Sarawak [P.U. (B) 245/2011]" (PDF). Attorney General's Chambers of Malaysia. 29 April 2011.

Sarawak state election, 2006
Party	Candidate	Votes	%	∆%
BN	Francis Harden Hollis	5,144	85.31	▼0.07
SNAP	Peli Aron	886	14.69	▲14.69
Total valid votes		6,030	100.00	
Total rejected ballots		145		
Unreturned ballots		74		
Turnout		6,249	63.44	▼0.67
Registered electors		9,849		
Majority		4,258	70.61	▼0.14
BN hold		Swing		

Sarawak state election, 2001
Party	Candidate	Votes	%	∆%
BN	Francis Harden Hollis	8,408	85.38	▼1.17
Independent	Asem Mansor	1,440	14.62	▲14.62
Total valid votes		9,848	100.00	
Total rejected ballots		159		
Unreturned ballots		188		
Turnout		10,195	64.11	▼0.01
Registered electors		15,903		
Majority		6,968	70.75	▼2.34
BN hold		Swing		

Sarawak state election, 1996
Party	Candidate	Votes	%	∆%
BN	Francis Harden Hollis	8,215	86.55	▲36.91
Independent	Othman Abdullah	1,277	13.45	▲13.45
Total valid votes		9,492	100.00	
Total rejected ballots		194		
Unreturned ballots		242		
Turnout		9,928	64.12	▼8.34
Registered electors		15,484		
Majority		6,938	73.09	▲71.06
BN hold		Swing		

Sarawak state election, 1991
Party	Candidate	Votes	%	∆%
BN	Michael Pilo Gangga	4,818	49.64	▼4.28
PBDS	Ngu Piew Seng	4,621	47.61	▲1.53
Independent	Azmi Lamat	165	1.70	▲1.70
Independent	Simong Naga	62	0.64	▲0.64
NEGARA	Banie Laba	39	0.40	▲0.40
Total valid votes		9,705	100.00	
Total rejected ballots		94		
Unreturned ballots		21		
Turnout		9,820	72.46	
Registered electors		13,553		
Majority		197	2.03	▼5.81
BN hold		Swing		

Sarawak state election, 1974
Party	Candidate	Votes	%	∆%
BN	Hollis Tini	3,726	53.92	▲26.47
SNAP	Nelson Liap Kudu	3,184	46.08	▲9.37
Total valid votes		6,910	100.00	
Total rejected ballots				
Unreturned ballots				
Turnout				
Registered electors		9,711		
Majority		542	7.84	▼1.42
BN gain from SNAP		Swing		?

Sarawak state election, 1969
Party	Candidate	Votes	%
SNAP	Nelson Liap Kudu	2,513	36.71
SUPP	Hollis Tini	1,879	27.45
PBB	Rabaie Ahmad @ Wang	1,048	15.31
PESAKA	Jimbai Maja	718	10.49
Independent	Awang Johari Pengiran Azid	279	4.08
Independent	Joshua Jangga	192	2.80
Independent	Goh Teo Chun	143	2.09
Independent	Anthony Jiram	73	1.07
Total valid votes		6,845	100.00
Total rejected ballots		445	
Unreturned ballots		0	
Turnout		7,290	80.11
Registered electors		9,100	
Majority		634	9.26
This was a new constituency created.
