= Asajaya (state constituency) =

State constituency in Sarawak, Malaysia

Asajaya (N15)
Sarawak constituency

State constituency
- Legislature: Sarawak State Legislative Assembly
MLA
Vacant
- Constituency created: 1987
- First contested: 1991
- Last contested: 2026

Asajaya is a state constituency in Sarawak, Malaysia, that has been represented in the Sarawak State Legislative Assembly since 1991.

The state constituency was created in the 1987 redistribution and is mandated to return a single member to the Sarawak State Legislative Assembly under the first past the post voting system.

== Demographics ==
Ethnic breakdown of Asajaya's electorate as of 2022
1. Malay-Muslim bumiputera (80.2%)
2. Sarawak bumiputera (10.2%)
3. Chinese (9.30%)
4. Other ethnicities (0.30%)

== History ==
As of 2020, Asajaya has a population of 20,017 people.

=== Polling districts ===
According to the gazette issued on 31 October 2022, the Asajaya constituency has a total of 19 polling districts.

State constituency	Polling Districts	Code	Location
Asajaya（N15）	Beliong	197/15/01	SK Beliong
Asajaya（N15）	Tanjung Apong	197/15/02	SK Tanjung Apong; Dewan Kpg. Sri Tajo
Asajaya（N15）	Tambirat	197/15/03	SMK Asajaya No. 2
Asajaya（N15）	Tambey	197/15/04	SK Tambey
Asajaya（N15）	Sui	197/15/05	(Ruang B) Dewan Serbaguna Kpg. Semawang
Asajaya（N15）	Sambir	197/15/06	SK Sambir
Asajaya（N15）	Sebandi Matang	197/15/07	SK Sebandi Matang
Asajaya（N15）	Sebandi Ulu	197/15/08	SK Sebandi Ulu
Asajaya（N15）	Subi	197/15/09	SJK (C) Chung Hua Sambir
Asajaya（N15）	Moyan	197/15/10	SK Moyan Laut
Asajaya（N15）	Reba	197/15/11	SK Rebak
Asajaya（N15）	Moyan Ulu	197/15/12	Dewan Kpg. Moyan Ulu
Asajaya（N15）	Moyan Ledang	197/15/13	Dewan Kpg. Moyan Ledang
Asajaya（N15）	Serpan	197/15/14	SK Serpan
Asajaya（N15）	Serpan Ulu	197/15/15	Dewan Kpg. Serpan Ulu
Asajaya（N15）	Asajaya	197/15/16	SK Asajaya Ulu
Asajaya（N15）	Asajaya Laut	197/15/17	SK Asajaya Laut; Dewan Serbaguna Kampung Asajaya Tengah
Asajaya（N15）	Tebun	197/15/18	SK Sampun Tebun
Asajaya（N15）	Sampum	197/15/19	Balai Raya Sampun Gerunggang

=== Representation history ===
Members of the Legislative Assembly for Asajaya
Assembly	No	Years	Member	Party
Constituency created from Sebandi and Muara Tuang
13th	N12	1991–1996	Abdul Taib Mahmud	BN (PBB)
14th	N12	1996–2001	Abdul Taib Mahmud	BN (PBB)
15th	N12	2001–2006	Abdul Karim Rahman Hamzah	BN (PBB)
16th	N14	2006–2011	Abdul Karim Rahman Hamzah	BN (PBB)
17th	N14	2011–2016	Abdul Karim Rahman Hamzah	BN (PBB)
18th	N15	2016–2018	Abdul Karim Rahman Hamzah	BN (PBB)
18th	N15	2018–2021	Abdul Karim Rahman Hamzah	GPS (PBB)
19th	N15	2021–2026	Abdul Karim Rahman Hamzah	GPS (PBB)

== Election results ==
Sarawak state election, 2026
Party	Candidate	Votes	%	∆%
GPS				▲
PH				▲
Total valid votes				
Total rejected ballots				
Unreturned ballots				
Turnout				
Registered electors				
Majority				

Sarawak state election, 2021
Party	Candidate	Votes	%	∆%
GPS	Abdul Karim Rahman Hamzah	6,380	70.04	▲70.04
PSB	Ishak Buji	1,849	20.30	▲20.30
PKR	Mahmud Epah	721	7.92	▼17.36
PBK	Mohamad Mahdeen Saharuddin	159	1.75	▲1.75
Total valid votes		9,109	100.00	
Total rejected ballots		171		
Unreturned ballots		76		
Turnout		9,356	75.77	▼0.56
Registered electors		12,349		
Majority		4,531	49.74	▲0.30
GPS gain from BN		Swing		?
Source(s) https://lom.agc.gov.my/ilims/upload/portal/akta/outputp/1718688/PUB687.pdf

Sarawak state election, 2016
Party	Candidate	Votes	%	∆%
BN	Abdul Karim Rahman Hamzah	6,163	74.72	▲3.75
PKR	Abang Junaidi Abang Gom	2,085	25.28	▼3.75
Total valid votes		8,248	100.00	
Total rejected ballots		107		
Unreturned ballots		16		
Turnout		8,371	76.33	▼2.52
Registered electors		10,967		
Majority		4,078	49.44	▲7.51
BN hold		Swing		
Source(s) "Federal Government Gazette - Notice of Contested Election, State Legislative Assembly of the State of Sarawak [P.U. (B) 190/2016]" (PDF). Attorney General's Chambers of Malaysia. 25 April 2016. Archived from the original (PDF) on 12 June 2017. "Senarai Calon yang Disahkan Layak Bertanding Pilihan Raya Dewan Undangan Negeri ke-11". Election Commission of Malaysia. 25 April 2016. Archived from the original on 25 April 2016.

Sarawak state election, 2011
Party	Candidate	Votes	%	∆%
BN	Abdul Karim Rahman Hamzah	7,597	70.97	▼7.68
PKR	Arip Ameran	3,108	29.03	▲7.68
Total valid votes		10,705	100.00	
Total rejected ballots		148		
Unreturned ballots		28		
Turnout		10,881	78.85	▲3.86
Registered electors		13,799		
Majority		4,489	41.93	▼15.37
BN hold		Swing		
Source(s) "Federal Government Gazette - Results of Contested Election and Statements of the Poll after the Official Addition of Votes Sarawak [P.U. (B) 245/2011]" (PDF). Attorney General's Chambers of Malaysia. 29 April 2011.

Sarawak state election, 2006
Party	Candidate	Votes	%	∆%
BN	Abdul Karim Rahman Hamzah	6,949	78.65	▲8.05
PKR	Mosidi Sait	1,886	21.35	▲11.50
Total valid votes		8,835	100.00	
Total rejected ballots		168		
Unreturned ballots		8		
Turnout		9,011	74.99	▼3.06
Registered electors		12,016		
Majority		5,063	57.30	▲6.25
BN hold		Swing		

Sarawak state election, 2001
Party	Candidate	Votes	%	∆%
BN	Abdul Karim Rahman Hamzah	5,068	70.60	▲70.60
Independent	Abang Abu Bakar Abang Mustapha	1,403	19.55	▲19.55
PKR	Abdullah Daraup	707	9.85	▲9.85
Total valid votes		7,178	100.00	
Total rejected ballots		90		
Unreturned ballots		0		
Turnout		7,268	78.05	
Registered electors		9,312		
Majority		3,665	51.06	
BN hold		Swing		

Sarawak state election, 1996
Party	Candidate	Votes	%	∆%
On the nomination day, Abdul Taib Mahmud won uncontested.
BN	Abdul Taib Mahmud			
Total valid votes			100.00	
Total rejected ballots				
Unreturned ballots				
Turnout				
Registered electors		9,453		
Majority				
BN hold		Swing		

Sarawak state election, 1991
Party	Candidate	Votes	%
BN	Abdul Taib Mahmud	4,601	68.43
PERMAS	Wan Zainal Senusi	1,465	21.79
DAP	Bujang Bakar	617	9.18
NEGARA	Mohd Adam Shah Anuar	41	0.61
Total valid votes		6,724	100.00
Total rejected ballots		61	
Unreturned ballots		16	
Turnout		6,801	78.48
Registered electors		8,666	
Majority		3,136	46.64
This was a new constituency created.
