= Roland Sagah Wee Inn =

Malaysian politician

Yang Berhormat Dato Sri Datuk Roland Sagah Wee Inn MLA PNBS PGBK
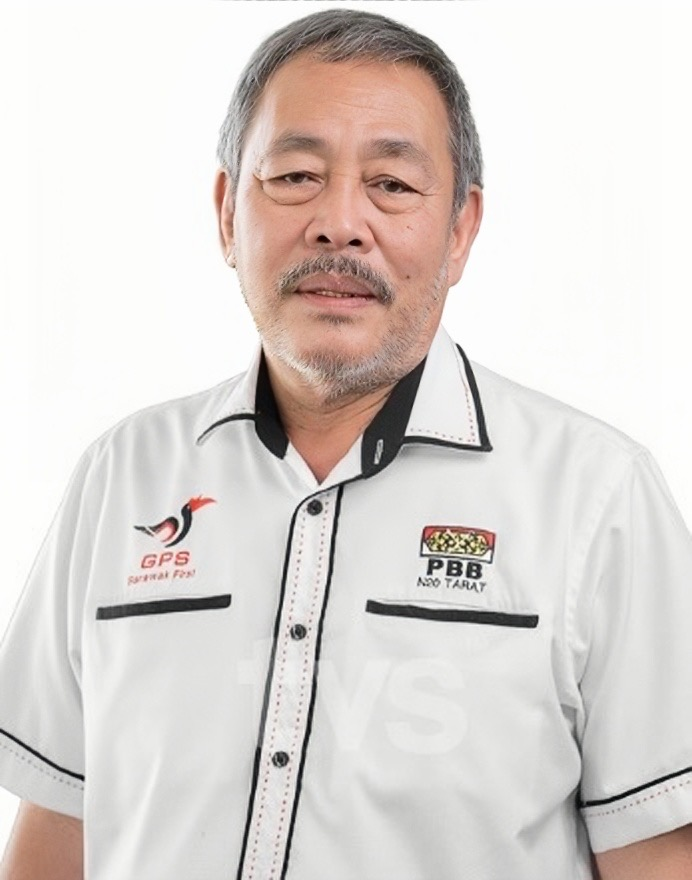

Minister for Education, Innovation and Talent Development
- Incumbent
- Assumed office 2022
- Governor: Abdul Taib Mahmud (2022-2024); Wan Junaidi Tuanku Jaafar (since 2024)
- Premier: Abang Johari
- Preceded by: Position established

Member of the Sarawak State Legislative Assembly for Tarat
- Incumbent
- Assumed office 1996
- Preceded by: Frederick Bayoi Manggie

Personal details
- Citizenship: Malaysian
- Party: PBB
- Other political affiliations: Barisan Nasional (till 2018); Gabungan Parti Sarawak (since 2018)
- Spouse: Kelly Ak Rebid
- Occupation: Politician

Roland Sagah Wee Inn is a Malaysian politician from PBB. He has served as the Member of the Sarawak State Legislative Assembly for Tarat since 1996. He is also Minister for Education, Innovation and Talent Development for Sarawak.

== Political career ==
Roland is one of the Vice Presidents of PBB.

== Election results ==
Sarawak State Legislative Assembly
Year	Constituency	Candidate	Votes	Pct.	Opponent(s)	Votes	Pct.	Ballots cast	Majority	Turnout
1996	N15 Tarat	Roland Sagah Wee Inn (PBB)	Unopposed							
2001	N15 Tarat	Roland Sagah Wee Inn (PBB)	7,555	79.63%	Tusa Lo Tai Chai (IND)	1,268	13.36%	9,661	6,297	64.54%
2001	N15 Tarat	Roland Sagah Wee Inn (PBB)	7,555	79.63%	Jeffrey Gugui Jiwan (IND)	665	7.01%	9,661	6,297	64.54%
2006	N17 Tarat	Roland Sagah Wee Inn (PBB)	5,854	69.26%	Alex Saben Nipong (SNAP)	2,598	30.74%	8,678	3,256	57.20%
2011	N17 Tarat	Roland Sagah Wee Inn (PBB)	6,287	56.41%	Peter Ato Ana Mayau (PKR)	4,292	38.51%	11,382	1,995	69.61%
2011	N17 Tarat	Roland Sagah Wee Inn (PBB)	6,287	56.41%	Ateng Jeros (SNAP)	567	5.08%	11,382	1,995	69.61%
2016	N20 Tarat	Roland Sagah Wee Inn (PBB)	8,450	73.61%	Musa Ngog (PKR)	3,029	26.39%	11,748	5,421	71.67%
2021	N20 Tarat	Roland Sagah Wee Inn (PBB)	6,500	60.25%	Dadi Tiap Juul (PSB)	1,492	13.83%	11,014	5,008	62.67%
2021	N20 Tarat	Roland Sagah Wee Inn (PBB)	6,500	60.25%	Christo Michael (PKR)	1,445	13.39%	11,014	5,008	62.67%
2021	N20 Tarat	Roland Sagah Wee Inn (PBB)	6,500	60.25%	Edison Jamang (PBK)	1,183	10.96%	11,014	5,008	62.67%
2021	N20 Tarat	Roland Sagah Wee Inn (PBB)	6,500	60.25%	Bai Udin Dungak (IND)	169	1.57%	11,014	5,008	62.67%

== Honours ==
- Sarawak :
  - Commander of the Order of the Star of Hornbill Sarawak (PGBK) – Datuk (2011)
  - Knight Commander of the Most Exalted Order of the Star of Sarawak (PNBS) – Dato Sri (2023)
