= Nelson Balang Rining =

Malaysian politician

Yang Berbahagia Datuk Nelson Balang Rining PJN JMN PBS

Member of the Sarawak State Legislative Assembly for Ba'kelalan
- In office 2004–2011
- Preceded by: Judson Sakai Tagal
- Succeeded by: Baru Bian

Chairman of LAKU Management Sdn Bhd
- In office 20 February 2020 – 01 March 2025
- Preceded by: Ahmad Lai Bujang; Alice Jalan Empaling

Personal details
- Born: Balang anak Rining
- Citizenship: Malaysian
- Party: PDP
- Other political affiliations: BN (till 2018); GPS (since 2018); PN (since 2020)
- Occupation: Politician

Nelson Balang Rining is a Malaysian politician from PDP. He was the Member of Sarawak State Legislative Assembly for Ba'kelalan from 2004 to 2011 and is currently the Deputy President of PDP. He is one of the member of the Board of Directors of LAKU Management Sdn Bhd, a Sarawak government owned company, after being appointed on 20 February 2020.

== Election results ==
Sarawak State Legislative Assembly
Year	Constituency	Candidate	Votes	Pct.	Opponent(s)	Votes	Pct.	Total votes	Majority	Turnout
2004	N62 Ba'kelalan	Nelson Balang Rining (SPDP)	2,843	67.15%	Baru Bian (IND)	1,391	32.85%	4,313	1,452	56.04%
2006	N70 Ba'kelalan	Nelson Balang Rining (SPDP)	2,064	56.50%	Baru Bian (SNAP)	1,589	43.50%	3,680	475	58.56%

== Awards and recognitions ==
- Malaysia
  - Commander of the Order of Meritorious Service (PJN) – Datuk (2012)
  - Companion of the Order of the Defender of the Realm (JMN) (2010)
- Sarawak
  - Officer of the Most Exalted Order of the Star of Sarawak (PBS) (2010)
  - Silver Medal of the Sarawak Independence Diamond Jubilee Medal (2024)
