= Saribas (state constituency) =

State constituency in Sarawak, Malaysia

Saribas (N35)
Sarawak constituency

State constituency
- Legislature: Sarawak State Legislative Assembly
MLA
Vacant
- Constituency created: 1968
- First contested: 1969
- Last contested: 2026

Saribas is a state constituency in Sarawak, Malaysia, that has been represented in the Sarawak State Legislative Assembly since 1969.

The state constituency was created in the 1968 redistribution and is mandated to return a single member to the Sarawak State Legislative Assembly under the first past the post voting system.

== Demographics ==
Ethnic breakdown of Saribas's electorate as of 2022
1. Malay-Muslim bumiputera (82.3%)
2. Sarawak bumiputera (14.4%)
3. Chinese (2.80%)
4. Other ethnicities (0.50%)

== History ==
As of 2020, Saribas has a population of 11,477 people.

=== Polling districts ===
According to the gazette issued on 31 October 2022, the Saribas constituency has a total of 21 polling districts.

State constituency	Polling Districts	Code	Location
Saribas (N35)	Manggut	204/35/01	SK Manggut
Saribas (N35)	Tui	204/35/02	SK Tui
Saribas (N35)	Debak	204/35/03	SJK (C) Chung Hua Debak
Saribas (N35)	Bungin	204/35/04	SK Bungin
Saribas (N35)	Likis	204/35/05	SK St. Christopher Debak
Saribas (N35)	Supa	204/35/06	SK Supa
Saribas (N35)	Engkaras	204/35/07	SK Medang
Saribas (N35)	Buda	204/35/08	SK Buda
Saribas (N35)	Serabang	204/35/09	SK Serabang
Saribas (N35)	Belasu	204/35/10	SK St. Barnabas Belasau
Saribas (N35)	Sabar	204/35/11	RH Inchok Sabar
Saribas (N35)	Dit	204/35/12	SK Dit
Saribas (N35)	Dit Hulu	204/35/13	RH Jimbat Dit Ulu
Saribas (N35)	Bungei	204/35/14	SK Datuk Bandar Debak
Saribas (N35)	Jerai	204/35/15	RH Stephen Lambor Jerai
Saribas (N35)	Debak Laut	204/35/16	Dewan JKKK Kpg. Debak Laut
Saribas (N35)	Serembang	204/35/17	SK Serembang
Saribas (N35)	Tanjong Assam	205/35/18	SK Tanjung Assam
Saribas (N35)	Sebemban	204/35/19	SK Sebemban
Saribas (N35)	Belingan	204/35/20	SK Balingan
Saribas (N35)	Budak	204/35/21	RH James Tujuh Ak Panggau Budak Ili

=== Representation history ===
Members of the Legislative Assembly for Saribas
Assembly	No	Years	Member	Party
Constituency created
8th	N19	1970-1973	Kihok Amat	BUMIPUTERA
8th	N19	1973-1974	Kihok Amat	BN (PBB)
9th	N19	1974-1979	Abang Ahmad Urai	BN (PBB)
10th	N19	1979-1983	Zainuddin Satem	BN (PBB)
11th	N19	1983-1987	Zainuddin Satem	BN (PBB)
12th	N19	1987-1991	Bolhassan Di	BN (PBB)
13th	N24	1991-1996	Wahbi Junaidi	BN (PBB)
14th	N26	1996-2001	Wahbi Junaidi	BN (PBB)
15th	N26	2001-2006	Wahbi Junaidi	BN (PBB)
16th	N30	2006-2011	Wahbi Junaidi	BN (PBB)
17th	N30	2011-2016	Mohammad Razi Sitam	BN (PBB)
18th	N35	2016–2018	Mohammad Razi Sitam	BN (PBB)
18th	N35	2018-2021	Mohammad Razi Sitam	GPS (PBB)
19th	N35	2021–2026	Mohammad Razi Sitam	GPS (PBB)

== Election results ==
Sarawak state election, 2026
Party	Candidate	Votes	%	∆%
GPS				▲
PH				▲
Total valid votes				
Total rejected ballots				
Unreturned ballots				
Turnout				
Registered electors				
Majority				

Sarawak state election, 2021
Party	Candidate	Votes	%	∆%
GPS	Mohammad Razi Sitam	5,138	65.52	▲65.52
PKR	Patrick Kamis	1,902	24.25	▲3.82
PSB	Melaini Bolhassan	668	8.52	▲8.52
PBK	Sim Min Leong	74	0.94	▲0.94
Parti Sabah Demokratik Rakyat	Kurnaen Boben	60	0.77	▲0.77
Total valid votes		7,842	100.00	
Total rejected ballots		141		
Unreturned ballots		45		
Turnout		8,028	73.09	▼6.71
Registered electors		10,984		
Majority		3,236	41.26	▼17.88
GPS gain from BN		Swing		?
Source(s) https://lom.agc.gov.my/ilims/upload/portal/akta/outputp/1718688/PUB687.pdf

Sarawak state election, 2016
Party	Candidate	Votes	%	∆%
BN	Mohammad Razi Sitam	5,963	79.57	▲15.17
PKR	Yakup Daud	1,531	20.43	▼15.17
Total valid votes		7,494	100.00	
Total rejected ballots		112		
Unreturned ballots		277		
Turnout		7,883	79.80	▲3.98
Registered electors		9,879		
Majority		4,432	59.14	▲30.35
BN hold		Swing		
Source(s) "Federal Government Gazette - Notice of Contested Election, State Legislative Assembly of the State of Sarawak [P.U. (B) 190/2016]" (PDF). Attorney General's Chambers of Malaysia. 25 April 2016. Archived from the original (PDF) on 2017-06-12. "Senarai Calon yang Disahkan Layak Bertanding Pilihan Raya Dewan Undangan Negeri ke-11". Election Commission of Malaysia. 25 April 2016. Archived from the original on 25 April 2016.

Sarawak state election, 2011
Party	Candidate	Votes	%	∆%
BN	Mohammad Razi Sitam	3,865	64.40	▲13.42
PKR	Abang Zulkifli Awang Engkeh	2,137	35.60	▼13.42
Total valid votes		6,002	100.00	
Total rejected ballots		76		
Unreturned ballots		29		
Turnout		6,107	75.82	▲7.57
Registered electors		8,054		
Majority		1,728	28.79	▲26.83
BN hold		Swing		
Source(s) "Federal Government Gazette - Results of Contested Election and Statements of the Poll after the Official Addition of Votes Sarawak [P.U. (B) 245/2011]" (PDF). Attorney General's Chambers of Malaysia. 29 April 2011.

Sarawak state election, 2006
Party	Candidate	Votes	%	∆%
BN	Wahbi Junaidi	2,441	50.98	▼12.22
PKR	Abang Zulkifli Awang Engkeh	2,347	49.02	▲23.24
Total valid votes		4,788	100.00	
Total rejected ballots		84		
Unreturned ballots		5		
Turnout		4,877	68.25	▲2.80
Registered electors		7,145		
Majority		94	1.96	▼35.46
BN hold		Swing		

Sarawak state election, 2001
Party	Candidate	Votes	%	∆%
BN	Wahbi Junaidi	3,710	63.20	▲6.49
PKR	Abang Othman Abang Gom	1,513	25.78	▲25.78
Independent	Abang Ahmad Arabi Abang Bolhassan	384	6.54	▲6.54
Independent	James Entika Gubar	207	3.53	▲3.53
Independent	Chin Man Tak @ Raphael Mada	56	0.95	▲0.95
Total valid votes		5,870	100.00	
Total rejected ballots		114		
Unreturned ballots		3		
Turnout		5,987	65.45	▲3.58
Registered electors		9,148		
Majority		2,197	37.43	▲1.61
BN hold		Swing		

Sarawak state election, 1996
Party	Candidate	Votes	%	∆%
BN	Wahbi Junaidi	3,161	56.71	▲56.71
Independent	Zaini Sitam	1,165	20.90	▲20.90
Independent	Albert Dass	802	14.39	▲14.39
Independent	Jemat Panjang	446	8.00	▲8.00
Total valid votes		5,574	100.00	
Total rejected ballots		123		
Unreturned ballots		11		
Turnout		5,708	61.87	
Registered electors		9,226		
Majority		1,996	35.81	
BN hold		Swing		

Sarawak state election, 1991
Party	Candidate	Votes	%	∆%
On the nomination day, Wahbi Junaidi won uncontested.
BN	Wahbi Junaidi			
Total valid votes			100.00	
Total rejected ballots				
Unreturned ballots				
Turnout				
Registered electors		8,067		
Majority				
BN hold		Swing		

Sarawak state election, 1987
Party	Candidate	Votes	%	∆%
BN	Bolhassan Di	4,620	58.39	▲10.25
PERMAS	Zainuddin Satem	3,184	40.24	▼7.90
Independent	Ahmad Johan	108	1.37	▲1.37
Total valid votes		7,912	100.00	
Total rejected ballots		73		
Unreturned ballots		0		
Turnout		7,985	72.50	▲6.85
Registered electors		11,014		
Majority		1,436	18.15	▼0.77
BN hold		Swing		

Sarawak state election, 1983
Party	Candidate	Votes	%	∆%
BN	Zainuddin Satem	3,119	48.14	▼13.69
Independent	Mohd Parhi Bujang	1,893	29.22	▲29.22
Independent	Abang Madati Abang Dahanan	1,467	22.64	▲22.64
Total valid votes		6,479	100.00	
Total rejected ballots		116		
Unreturned ballots		0		
Turnout		6,595	65.77	▼3.02
Registered electors		10,028		
Majority		1,226	18.92	▼8.91
BN hold		Swing		

Sarawak state election, 1979
Party	Candidate	Votes	%	∆%
BN	Zainuddin Satem	3,613	61.83	▲1.96
Parti Anak Jati Sarawak	Alli Kawi	1,987	34.01	▲34.01
Independent	Abang Hipni Abang Turkey	161	2.76	▲2.76
Independent	Andrew Mara Walter Unjah	82	1.40	▲1.40
Total valid votes		5,843	100.00	
Total rejected ballots		107		
Unreturned ballots		0		
Turnout		5,950	68.96	▼10.75
Registered electors		8,628		
Majority		1,626	27.83	▲8.10
BN hold		Swing		

Sarawak state election, 1974
Party	Candidate	Votes	%	∆%
BN	Abang Ahmad Urai	3,224	59.87	▲17.28
SNAP	Stephen Chong Kai Hong	2,161	40.13	▲9.91
Total valid votes		5,385	100.00	
Total rejected ballots		436		
Unreturned ballots		0		
Turnout		5,821	79.70	▲10.13
Registered electors		7,304		
Majority		1,063	19.74	▲7.37
BN gain from PBB		Swing		?

Sarawak state election, 1969
Party	Candidate	Votes	%
PBB	Kihok Amat	1,849	42.59
SNAP	Jocelyn Beduru Makap	1,312	30.22
PESAKA	Hamsawi Omar	747	17.21
Independent	Denis Luat	252	5.81
Independent	Cr. Laili	181	4.17
Total valid votes		4,341	100.00
Total rejected ballots		266	
Unreturned ballots		0	
Turnout		4,607	69.57
Registered electors		6,622	
Majority		537	12.37
This was a new constituency created.
