= Ba'kelalan (state constituency) =

Constituency in Sarawak, Malaysia

Ba'kelalan (N81)
Sarawak constituency

State constituency
- Legislature: Sarawak State Legislative Assembly
MLA
Vacant
- Constituency created: 1996
- First contested: 1996
- Last contested: 2026

Ba'kelalan is a state constituency in Sarawak, Malaysia, that has been represented in the Sarawak State Legislative Assembly since 1996.

The state constituency was created in the 1996 redistribution and is mandated to return a single member to the Sarawak State Legislative Assembly under the first past the post voting system.

== Demographics ==
Ethnic breakdown of Ba'kelalan's electorate as of 2022
1. Sarawak bumiputera (86.9%)
2. Chinese (5.00%)
3. Malay-Muslim bumiputera (3.60%)
4. Other ethnicities (4.50%)

== History ==
As of 2020, Ba`Kelalan has a population of 2,453,677 people.

=== Polling districts ===
According to the Official Gazette dated 31 October 2022, the Ba'kelalan constituency has a total of 22 polling districts.

| State constituency | Polling Districts | Code | Location |
|---|---|---|---|
| Ba'kelalan（N81） | Semadoh | 222/81/01 | SK Lg. Semadoh |
| Ba'kelalan（N81） | Beriwan | 222/81/02 | Dewan Kpg. Puru Sia; SK Puru Sia |
| Ba'kelalan（N81） | Maligan | 222/81/03 | SK Lg. Sebangan |
| Ba'kelalan（N81） | Trusan | 222/81/04 | Dewan Masyarakat Trusan |
| Ba'kelalan（N81） | Sukang | 222/81/05 | SK Lg. Sukang |
| Ba'kelalan（N81） | Lupeng | 222/81/06 | SK Lg. Lupeng |
| Ba'kelalan（N81） | Ba'kelalan | 222/81/07 | SK Ba'kelalan |
| Ba'kelalan（N81） | Temarop | 222/81/08 | Dewan Masyarakat Lg. Temarop |
| Ba'kelalan（N81） | Suang | 222/81/09 | Balai Raya Long Kachu |
| Ba'kelalan（N81） | Talis | 222/81/10 | Pusat Kebudayaan Lun Bawang Kpg. Lg. Tuan |
| Ba'kelalan（N81） | Lapadan | 222/81/11 | SK Tang Lapadan |
| Ba'kelalan（N81） | Tengoa | 222/81/12 | SK Lg. Tengoa |
| Ba'kelalan（N81） | Tuma | 222/81/13 | SK Lg. Tuma Lawas |
| Ba'kelalan（N81） | Pengaleh | 222/81/14 | Dewan Masyarakat Kpg. Lg. Pengaleh |
| Ba'kelalan（N81） | Siang | 222/81/15 | SK Siang-Siang Lawas |
| Ba'kelalan（N81） | Pangi | 222/81/16 | SK Batu Lima |
| Ba'kelalan（N81） | Batu Tiga | 222/81/17 | Institut Latihan Islam Malaysia (ILIM), Kampus Lawas JAKIM |
| Ba'kelalan（N81） | Lampaki | 222/81/18 | Balai Raya Kpg. Undop |
| Ba'kelalan（N81） | Muncu | 222/81/19 | Balai Raya Kpg. Muncu Merapok |
| Ba'kelalan（N81） | Ranchangan | 222/81/20 | SK Kpg. Lintang Trusan |

=== Representation history ===
Members of the Legislative Assembly for Ba'kelalan
| Assembly | No | Years | Member | Party |
Constituency created from Telang Usan, Limbang and Lawas
| 14th | N62 | 1996-2001 | Judson Sakai Tagal | BN (SNAP) |
| 15th | N62 | 2001-2004 | Judson Sakai Tagal | BN (SNAP) |
| 15th | N62 | 2004-2006 | Nelson Balang Rining | BN (SPDP) |
| 16th | N70 | 2006-2011 | Nelson Balang Rining | BN (SPDP) |
| 17th | N70 | 2011-2016 | Baru Bian | PR (PKR) |
| 18th | N81 | 2016-2020 | Baru Bian | PH (PKR) |
| 18th | N81 | 2020 | Baru Bian | Independent |
| 18th | N81 | 2020-2021 | Baru Bian | PSB |
| 19th | N81 | 2021-2024 | Baru Bian | PSB |
| 19th | N81 | 2024 - 2026 | Baru Bian | GPS (PDP) |

== Election results ==
Sarawak state election, 2026
| Party | Candidate | Votes | % | ∆% |
|---|---|---|---|---|
| GPS | | | | ▲ |
| PH | | | | ▲ |
| Total valid votes | | | | |
| Total rejected ballots | | | | |
| Unreturned ballots | | | | |
| Turnout | | | | |
| Registered electors | | | | |
| Majority | | | | |

Sarawak state election, 2021
| Party | Candidate | Votes | % | ∆% |
|---|---|---|---|---|
| PSB | Baru Bian | 2,687 | 54.66 | ▲54.66 |
| GPS | Sam Laya | 2,007 | 40.83 | ▲40.83 |
| PBK | Peter Asut | 110 | 2.24 | ▲2.24 |
| PKR | Martin Samuel Labo | 57 | 1.16 | ▼54.04 |
| Independent | Agnes Padan | 55 | 1.12 | ▲1.12 |
| Total valid votes | | 4,916 | 100.00 | |
| Total rejected ballots | | 62 | | |
| Unreturned ballots | | 26 | | |
| Turnout | | 5,054 | 58.85 | ▲12.05 |
| Registered electors | | 8,503 | | |
| Majority | | 680 | 13.83 | ▲3.43 |
| PSB gain | | Swing | | |

Sarawak state election, 2016
| Party | Candidate | Votes | % | ∆% |
|---|---|---|---|---|
| PKR | Baru Bian | 2,858 | 55.20 | ▼0.01 |
| BN | Willie Liau | 2,320 | 44.80 | ▲0.01 |
| Total valid votes | | 5,178 | 100.00 | |
| Total rejected ballots | | 35 | | |
| Unreturned ballots | | 16 | | |
| Turnout | | 5,229 | 70.90 | ▲5.00 |
| Registered electors | | 7,375 | 10.40 | |
| Majority | | 538 | 10.40 | ▼0.02 |
| PKR hold | | Swing | | |
Source(s) "Federal Government Gazette - Notice of Contested Election, State Legislative Assembly of the State of Sarawak [P.U. (B) 190/2016]" (PDF). Attorney General's Chambers of Malaysia. 25 April 2016. Archived from the original (PDF) on 12 June 2017. "Senarai Calon yang Disahkan Layak Bertanding Pilihan Raya Dewan Undangan Negeri ke-11". Election Commission of Malaysia. 25 April 2016. Archived from the original on 25 April 2016.

Sarawak state election, 2011
| Party | Candidate | Votes | % | ∆% |
|---|---|---|---|---|
| PKR | Baru Bian | 2,505 | 55.21 | ▲55.21 |
| BN | Willie Liau | 2,032 | 44.79 | ▼11.71 |
| Total valid votes | | 4,537 | 100.00 | |
| Total rejected ballots | | 37 | | |
| Unreturned ballots | | 11 | | |
| Turnout | | 4,585 | 65.90 | ▲7.34 |
| Registered electors | | 6,958 | | |
| Majority | | 473 | 10.42 | ▼2.58 |
| PKR gain from BN | | Swing | | ? |
Source(s) "Federal Government Gazette - Results of Contested Election and Statements of the Poll after the Official Addition of Votes Sarawak [P.U. (B) 245/2011]" (PDF). Attorney General's Chambers of Malaysia. 29 April 2011.

Sarawak state election, 2006
| Party | Candidate | Votes | % | ∆% |
|---|---|---|---|---|
| BN | Nelson Balang Rining | 2,064 | 56.50 | ▼10.65 |
| SNAP | Baru Bian | 1,589 | 43.50 | ▲43.50 |
| Total valid votes | | 3,653 | 100.00 | |
| Total rejected ballots | | 26 | | |
| Unreturned ballots | | 1 | | |
| Turnout | | 3,680 | 58.56 | ▲2.52 |
| Registered electors | | 6,284 | | |
| Majority | | 475 | 13.00 | ▼21.30 |
| BN hold | | Swing | | {{{2}}} |

Sarawak state by-election, 18 September 2004 By-election was called upon the death of incumbent, Judson Sakai Tagal
| Party | Candidate | Votes | % | ∆% |
|---|---|---|---|---|
| BN | Nelson Balang Rining | 2,843 | 67.15 | ▲67.15 |
| Independent | Baru Bian | 1,391 | 32.85 | ▲32.85 |
| Total valid votes | | 4,234 | 100.00 | |
| Total rejected ballots | | 79 | | |
| Unreturned ballots | | 0 | | |
| Turnout | | 4,313 | 56.04 | |
| Registered electors | | 7,696 | | |
| Majority | | 1,452 | 34.30 | |
| BN hold | | Swing | | {{{2}}} |

Sarawak state election, 2001
| Party | Candidate | Votes | % | ∆% |
|---|---|---|---|---|
On the nomination day, Judson Sakai Tagal won uncontested.
| BN | Judson Sakai Tagal | | | |
| Total valid votes | | | 100.00 | |
| Total rejected ballots | | | | |
| Unreturned ballots | | | | |
| Turnout | | | | |
| Registered electors | | 7,787 | | |
| Majority | | | | |
| BN hold | | Swing | | {{{2}}} |

Sarawak state election, 1996
| Party | Candidate | Votes | % | ∆% |
|---|---|---|---|---|
On the nomination day, Judson Sakai Tagal won uncontested.
| BN | Judson Sakai Tagal | | | |
| Total valid votes | | | 100.00 | |
| Total rejected ballots | | | | |
| Unreturned ballots | | | | |
| Turnout | | | | |
| Registered electors | | 7,172 | | |
| Majority | | | | |
This was a new constituency created.
