= Lawas (disambiguation) =

Lawas may refer to:

- Lawas
- Lawas (federal constituency), represented in the Dewan Rakyat
- Lawas (state constituency), formerly represented in the Sarawak State Legislative Assembly (1969–2006)
