= Opar (state constituency) =

State constituency in Sarawak, Malaysia

Opar (N01)
Sarawak constituency

State constituency
- Legislature: Sarawak State Legislative Assembly
MLA
Vacant
- Constituency created: 2005
- First contested: 2006
- Last contested: 2026

Opar is a state constituency in Sarawak, Malaysia, that has been represented in the Sarawak State Legislative Assembly since 2006.

The state constituency was created in the 2005 redistribution and is mandated to return a single member to the Sarawak State Legislative Assembly under the first past the post voting system.

As of 2020, Opar has a population of 21,764 people.

== Demographics ==
Ethnic breakdown of Opar's electorate as of 2022
1. Sarawak bumiputera (88.3%)
2. Chinese (7.00%)
3. Malay-Muslim bumiputera (3.80%)
4. Other ethnicities (0.90%)

== History ==
=== Polling districts ===
According to the gazette issued on 31 October 2022, the Opar constituency has a total of 22 polling districts.

State constituency	Polling Districts	Code	Location
Opar（N01）	Sebiris	192/01/01	SK Sebiris
Opar（N01）	Jangkar	192/01/02	SK Jangkar
Opar（N01）	Sebandi	192/01/03	SK Sebandi
Opar（N01）	Temaga	192/02/04	SK Temaga/Paon
Opar（N01）	Stungkor	192/01/05	SK Kpg. Stungkor
Opar（N01）	Opar	192/01/06	SK Opar
Opar（N01）	Serayan	192/01/07	SK Serayan/Keranji
Opar（N01）	Rukam	192/01/08	SK Holy Name Kpg. Rukam
Opar（N01）	Senbawang	192/01/09	Balai Raya Perundang
Opar（N01）	Kandaie	192/01/10	Balai Raya Kpg. Kandaie
Opar（N01）	Pasir Tengah	192/01/11	SK Pasir Tengah
Opar（N01）	Sedaing	192/01/12	Balai Raya Kpg. Opek
Opar（N01）	Biawak	192/01/13	SK Biawak
Opar（N01）	Senibong	192/01/14	SK Senibong
Opar（N01）	Sebako	192/01/15	SK Sebako
Opar（N01）	Raso	192/01/16	Balai Raya Raso I
Opar（N01）	Raso II	192/01/17	Balai Raya Raso II
Opar（N01）	Bokah	192/01/18	SK Bokah
Opar（N01）	Stom Muda	192/01/19	Balai Raya Kpg. Stom Muda
Opar（N01）	Selampit	192/01/20	SK Kpg. Selampit
Opar（N01）	Jugan	192/01/21	SK Tembawang
Opar（N01）	Setenggeng	192/01/22	SK St. Teresa

=== Representation history ===
Members of the Legislative Assembly for Opar
Assembly	No	Years	Member	Party
Constituency created from Tanjong Datu and Tasik Biru
16th	N01	2006-2011	Ranum Mina	BN (SUPP)
17th	N01	2011-2014	Ranum Mina	BN (SUPP)
17th	N01	2014	Ranum Mina	TERAS
17th	N01	2014-2016	Ranum Mina	UPP
18th	N01	2016-2018	Ranum Mina	BN (Direct)
18th	N01	2018-2021	Ranum Mina	PSB
19th	N01	2021–2026	Billy Sujang	GPS (SUPP)

== Election results ==
Sarawak state election, 2026
Party	Candidate	Votes	%	∆%
GPS				▲
DAP	Lim Nee Kon			▲
Total valid votes				
Total rejected ballots				
Unreturned ballots				
Turnout				
Registered electors				
Majority				

Sarawak state election, 2021
Party	Candidate	Votes	%	∆%
GPS	Billy Sujang	3,659	46.77	▲46.77
PSB	Ranum Mina	1,970	25.18	▲25.18
PBK	Freedy Misid	1,487	19.01	▲19.01
PKR	Meneng Biris	327	4.18	▼16.98
PBDS Baru	Saini Kakong	220	2.81	▲2.81
Parti Sedar Rakyat	Bayang Telon	160	2.05	▲2.05
Total valid votes		7,823		
Total rejected ballots		112		
Unreturned ballots		23		
Turnout		7,958	69.59	▼6.78
Registered electors		11,436		
Majority		1,689	21.59	▼18.88
GPS gain from BN		Swing		?
Source(s) https://lom.agc.gov.my/ilims/upload/portal/akta/outputp/1718688/PUB687.pdf

Sarawak state election, 2016
Party	Candidate	Votes	%	∆%
BN	Ranum Mina	3,665	50.06	▼7.25
Independent	Niponi Undek	1,583	21.62	▲21.62
PKR	Francis Teron Kadap Noyet	1,549	21.16	▼1.93
PBDS Baru	Patrick Uren	524	7.16	▲7.16
Total valid votes		7,321	100.00	
Total rejected ballots		57		
Unreturned ballots		41		
Turnout		7,419	76.37	▲2.90
Registered electors		9,714		
Majority		2,082	28.44	▲3.79
BN hold		Swing		
Source(s) "Federal Government Gazette - Notice of Contested Election, State Legislative Assembly of the State of Sarawak [P.U. (B) 190/2016]" (PDF). Attorney General's Chambers of Malaysia. 25 April 2016. Archived from the original (PDF) on 12 June 2017. "Senarai Calon yang Disahkan Layak Bertanding Pilihan Raya Dewan Undangan Negeri ke- 11". Election Commission of Malaysia. 25 April 2016. Archived from the original on 25 April 2016.

Sarawak state election, 2011
Party	Candidate	Votes	%	∆%
BN	Ranum Mina	3,360	57.31	▼14.58
PKR	Boniface Willy Tumek	1,354	23.09	▲23.09
SNAP	Stephen Sagir	674	11.50	▼16.61
Independent	Joseph Jindy Peter Rosen	475	8.10	▲8.10
Total valid votes		5,863	100.00	
Total rejected ballots		68		
Unreturned ballots		19		
Turnout		5,950	73.47	▲4.58
Registered electors		8,099		
Majority		2,006	34.21	▼8.11
BN hold		Swing		
Source(s) https://github.com/TindakMalaysia/HISTORICAL-ELECTION-RESULTS/blob/main/2011-SARAWAK-STATE-ELECTIONS/SARAWAK_2011_DUN_RESULTS.csv

Sarawak state election, 2006
Party	Candidate	Votes	%
BN	Ranum Mina	3,585	71.89
SNAP	Patrick Uren	1,402	28.11
Total valid votes		4,987	100.00
Total rejected ballots		91	
Unreturned ballots		6	
Turnout		5,084	68.89
Registered electors		7,379	
Majority		2,183	43.77
This was a new constituency created.
Source(s) https://github.com/TindakMalaysia/HISTORICAL-ELECTION-RESULTS/blob/main/2006-SARAWAK-STATE-ELECTIONS/Sarawak_2006_DUN_Results.csv
