= Balai Ringin (state constituency) =

State constituency in Sarawak, Malaysia

Balai Ringin (N30)
Sarawak constituency

State constituency
- Legislature: Sarawak State Legislative Assembly
MLA
Vacant
- Constituency created: 2005
- First contested: 2006
- Last contested: 2026

Balai Ringin is a state constituency in Sarawak, Malaysia, that has been represented in the Sarawak State Legislative Assembly since 2006.

The state constituency was created in the 2005 redistribution and is mandated to return a single member to the Sarawak State Legislative Assembly under the first past the post voting system.

== Demographics ==
Ethnic breakdown of Balai Ringin's electorate as of 2022
1. Sarawak bumiputera (87.5%)
2. Chinese (7.20%)
3. Malay-Muslim bumiputera (5.10%)
4. Other ethnicities (0.70%)

== History ==
As of 2020, Balai Ringin has a population of 15,165 people.

=== Polling districts ===
According to the gazette issued on 31 October 2022, the Balai Ringin constituency has a total of 7 polling districts.

State constituency	Polling Districts	Code	Location
Balai Ringin（N30）	Isu	202/30/01	Balai Raya Kpg. Kesindu Simunjan; RH Suntat Galung Kpg. Sebangkoi Jaya Simunjan; RH Ganti Anak Jentai, Sabal Kruin; SK Sg. Pinang; SK Gawang Empili; SK Nyelitak; SK Telagus / Jerok; Sabal Nursery Centre
Balai Ringin（N30）	Balai Ringin	202/30/02	SK Semada; Balai Raya Kpg. Ensebang Kuari; SK Balai Ringin; RH Rentap Ak Gasan Melikin Sg. Panggil; RH Aning Anak Melintang Ensebang Pelai; Balai Raya Tanah Mawang
Balai Ringin（N30）	Ruan	202/30/03	Dewan Serbaguna Kpg. Kepit Bukit Punda Simunjan; RH Jepit Kpg. Spaoh Raba; Dewan Sri Kumang SK Padang Pedalai
Balai Ringin（N30）	Kedumpai	202/30/04	RH Enterus Kpg. Sega; SK Kedumpai; RH Umpang Anak Kiot. Kampung Pendawan, Simunjan; SK Tuba; SK Mentu Ulu Sebuyau; RH Menari Ipoh; RH Merajan Semawa; SK Muding
Balai Ringin（N30）	Ubah	202/30/05	RH Ngulu Empaling A; RH Jawan Tekuyong B; SK Jaong; SK Abok; SK Aping; RH Langie Anak Tawie Sebemban; SK St. Leo Gayau
Balai Ringin（N30）	Pantu	202/30/06	Tadika Kemas Rapak; RH Hearold Selantel III Pantu; SJK (C) Chung Hua Pantu; SK Pantu
Balai Ringin（N30）	Keranggas	202/30/07	SK Keranggas Pantu; Tadika Kemas Sapak

=== Representation history ===
Members of the Legislative Assembly for Balai Ringin
Assembly	No	Years	Member	Party
Constituency created from Bukit Begunan, Simunjan and Kedup
16th	N25	2006–2011	Snowdan Lawan	BN (PRS)
17th	N25	2011–2016	Snowdan Lawan	BN (PRS)
18th	N30	2016-2018	Snowdan Lawan	BN (PRS)
18th	N30	2018-2021	Snowdan Lawan	GPS (PRS)
19th	N30	2021–2026	Snowdan Lawan	GPS (PRS)

== Election results ==
Sarawak state election, 2026
Party	Candidate	Votes	%	∆%
GPS				▲
PH				▲
Total valid votes				
Total rejected ballots				
Unreturned ballots				
Turnout				
Registered electors				
Majority				

Sarawak state election, 2021
Party	Candidate	Votes	%	∆%
GPS	Snowdan Lawan	4,816	56.38	▲56.38
PSB	Masir Kujat	3,531	41.34	▲41.34
PBK	Kasim Mana	195	2.28	▲2.28
Total valid votes		8,542	100.00	
Total rejected ballots		101		
Unreturned ballots		24		
Turnout		8,667	80.32	▲1.95
Registered electors		10,791		
Majority		1,285	15.04	▼11.41
GPS gain from BN		Swing		?
Source(s) https://lom.agc.gov.my/ilims/upload/portal/akta/outputp/1718688/PUB687.pdf

Sarawak state election, 2016
Party	Candidate	Votes	%	∆%
BN	Snowdan Lawan	4,478	58.10	▼6.53
Independent	Entusa Imam	2,439	31.65	▲31.65
PKR	Nicholas Mujah Ason	700	9.08	▼10.57
PBDS Baru	Pok Ungkut	90	1.17	▲1.17
Total valid votes		7,707	100.00	
Total rejected ballots		0		
Unreturned ballots		87		
Turnout		7,794	78.37	▲3.99
Registered electors		9,945		
Majority		2,039	26.46	▼18.53
BN hold		Swing		
Source(s) "Federal Government Gazette - Notice of Contested Election, State Legislative Assembly of the State of Sarawak [P.U. (B) 190/2016]" (PDF). Attorney General's Chambers of Malaysia. 25 April 2016. Archived from the original (PDF) on 12 June 2017. "Senarai Calon yang Disahkan Layak Bertanding Pilihan Raya Dewan Undangan Negeri ke-11". Election Commission of Malaysia. 25 April 2016. Archived from the original on 25 April 2016.

Sarawak state election, 2011
Party	Candidate	Votes	%	∆%
BN	Snowdan Lawan	4,145	64.63	▲7.43
PKR	Ibi Uding	1,260	19.65	▲19.65
SNAP	Dan Giang	765	11.93	▼17.07
Love Malaysia Party	Lipeh Mawi	126	1.96	▲1.96
Independent	Cobbold Lusoi	85	1.33	▼12.47
Independent	Sujal Gansi	32	0.50	▲0.50
Total valid votes		6,413	100.00	
Total rejected ballots		110		
Unreturned ballots		21		
Turnout		6,544	74.38	▲8.03
Registered electors		8,798		
Majority		2,885	44.99	▲16.79
BN hold		Swing		
Source(s) "Federal Government Gazette - Results of Contested Election and Statements of the Poll after the Official Addition of Votes Sarawak [P.U. (B) 245/2011]" (PDF). Attorney General's Chambers of Malaysia. 29 April 2011.

Sarawak state election, 2006
Party	Candidate	Votes	%
BN	Snowdan Lawan	3,075	57.20
SNAP	Ibi Uding	1,559	29.00
Independent	Cobbold Lusoi	742	13.80
Total valid votes		5,376	100.00
Total rejected ballots		76	
Unreturned ballots		18	
Turnout		5,470	66.35
Registered electors		8,244	
Majority		1,516	28.20
This was a new constituency created.
