= Mohammad Razi Sitam =

Malaysian politician

Yang Berhormat Datuk Mohammad Razi Sitam PGBK JBS KMN MLA
- موهامماد رازي سيتام

Deputy Minister for Women, Early Childhood and Community Wellbeing Development
- Incumbent
- Assumed office 2022 Serving with Rosey Yunus
- Governor: Abdul Taib Mahmud (2022-2024); Wan Junaidi Tuanku Jaafar (since 2024)
- Premier: Abang Johari
- Preceded by: Position established

Member of the Sarawak State Legislative Assembly for Saribas
- Incumbent
- Assumed office 2011
- Preceded by: Wahbi Junaidi

Personal details
- Born: Mohammad Razi bin Sitam Sarawak
- Citizenship: Malaysian
- Party: PBB
- Other political affiliations: Barisan Nasional (till 2018); Gabungan Parti Sarawak (since 2018)
- Occupation: Politician

Ricky @ Mohammad Razi bin Sitam is a Malaysian politician from PBB. He has served as the Member of the Sarawak State Legislative Assembly for Saribas since 2011. He is also the Sarawak Deputy Minister for Youth, Sport and Entrepreneur Development.

== Election results ==
Sarawak State Legislative Assembly
Year	Constituency	Candidate	Votes	Pct.	Opponent(s)	Votes	Pct.	Ballots cast	Majority	Turnout
2011	N30 Saribas	Mohammad Razi Sitam (PBB)	3,865	64.40%	Abang Zulkifli Awang Engkeh (PKR)	2,137	35.60%	6,107	1,728	75.82%
2016	N35 Saribas	Mohammad Razi Sitam (PBB)	5,963	79.57%	Yakup Daud (PKR)	1,531	20.43%	7,883	4,432	79.80%
2021	N35 Saribas	Mohammad Razi Sitam (PBB)	5,138	65.52%	Patrick Kamis (PKR)	1,902	24.25%	8,028	3,236	73.09%
2021	N35 Saribas	Mohammad Razi Sitam (PBB)	5,138	65.52%	Melaini Bolhassan (PSB)	668	8.52%	8,028	3,236	73.09%
2021	N35 Saribas	Mohammad Razi Sitam (PBB)	5,138	65.52%	Sim Min Leong (PBK)	74	0.94%	8,028	3,236	73.09%
2021	N35 Saribas	Mohammad Razi Sitam (PBB)	5,138	65.52%	Kurnaen Boben (SEDAR)	60	0.77%	8,028	3,236	73.09%

== Honours ==
- Malaysia
  - Officer of the Order of the Defender of the Realm (KMN) (2017)
- Sarawak
  - Commander of the Order of the Star of Hornbill Sarawak (PGBK) – Datuk (2024)
  - Companion of the Most Exalted Order of the Star of Sarawak (JBS) (2020)
