= Abdul Karim Rahman Hamzah =

Malaysian politician

Yang Berhormat Dato Sri Abdul Karim Rahman Hamzah PNBS PGBK MLA
- عبد الكريم الرحمن حمزة
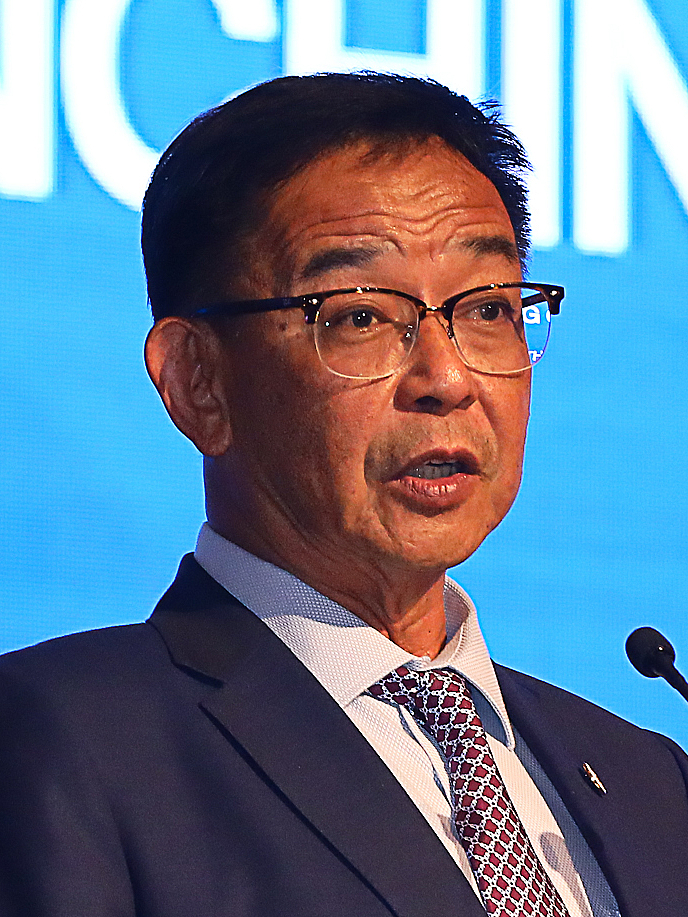
- Abdul Karim in 2020

Ministerial roles (Sarawak)
- 2011–2017: Assistant Minister of Housing and Youth Development
- 2017: Assistant Minister of Youth and Sports
- 2017–: Minister of Tourism, Art, Culture, Youth and Sports

Faction represented in Sarawak State Legislative Assembly
- 2001–2018: Barisan Nasional
- 2018: Parti Pesaka Bumiputera Bersatu
- 2018–: Gabungan Parti Sarawak

Personal details
- Born: Abdul Karim bin Rahman Hamzah; 15 May 1960 (age 66) Crown Colony of Sarawak
- Citizenship: Malaysia
- Party: Parti Pesaka Bumiputera Bersatu
- Other political affiliations: Barisan Nasional (until 2018); Gabungan Parti Sarawak (since 2018)
- Occupation: Politician; lawyer

Abdul Karim bin Rahman Hamzah (Jawi: عبد الكريم الرحمن حمزة; born 15 May 1960) is a Malaysian politician who served as Sarawak State Minister for Tourism, Creative Industry and Performing Arts since 2017. A member of Parti Pesaka Bumiputera Bersatu, he represented Asajaya in Sarawak State Legislative Assembly since 2001.

== Early life ==
Abdul Karim was born on 15 May 1960.

== Political career ==
Abdul Karim was first appointed as Assistant Minister for Housing and Youth Development after successfully defending his seat and becoming a three-term MLA in 2011.

In May 2017, Abdul Karim was promoted to full minister by the sixth Chief Minister of Sarawak Abang Johari to head the Ministry of Tourism, Art, Culture, Youth and Sports.

== Election results ==
Sarawak State Legislative Assembly
Year	Constituency	Candidate	Votes	Pct	Opponent(s)	Votes	Pct	Ballots cast	Majority	Turnout
2001	N12 Asajaya	Abdul Karim Rahman Hamzah (PBB)	5,068	70.60%	Abang Abu Bakar Abang Mustapha (IND)	1,403	19.55%	7,268	3,655	78.05%
2001	N12 Asajaya	Abdul Karim Rahman Hamzah (PBB)	5,068	70.60%	Abdullah Daraup (keADILan)	707	9.85%	7,268	3,655	78.05%
2006	N14 Asajaya	Abdul Karim Rahman Hamzah (PBB)	6,949	78.65%	Mosidi Sait (PKR)	1,886	19.55%	9,011	5,063	74.99%
2011	N14 Asajaya	Abdul Karim Rahman Hamzah (PBB)	7,597	70.97%	Arip Ameran (PKR)	3,108	29.03%	10,881	4,489	78.85%
2016	N15 Asajaya	Abdul Karim Rahman Hamzah (PBB)	6,163	74.72%	Abang Junaidi Abang Gom (PKR)	2,085	25.28%	8,371	4,078	76.63%
2021	N15 Asajaya	Abdul Karim Rahman Hamzah (PBB)	6,380	70.04%	Mahmud Epah (PKR)	721	7.92%	9,109	4,531	73.83%
2021	N15 Asajaya	Abdul Karim Rahman Hamzah (PBB)	6,380	70.04%	Ishak Buji (PSB)	1,849	20.30%	9,109	4,531	73.83%
2021	N15 Asajaya	Abdul Karim Rahman Hamzah (PBB)	6,380	70.04%	Mohamad Mahdeen Saharuddin (PBK)	159	1.75%	9,109	4,531	73.83%

== Honours ==
- Sarawak
  - Knight Commander of the Most Exalted Order of the Star of Sarawak (PNBS) – Dato Sri (2021)
  - Commander of the Order of the Star of Hornbill Sarawak (PGBK) – Datuk (2013)
  - Gold Medal of the Sarawak Independence Diamond Jubilee Medal (2023)

== See also ==
- Asajaya (state constituency)
