= Billy Sujang =

Malaysian politician

Yang Berhormat Billy Sujang MLA

Member of the Sarawak State Legislative Assembly for Opar
- Incumbent
- Assumed office 2021
- Preceded by: Ranum Mina

Personal details
- Born: Billy anak Sujang Sarawak
- Citizenship: Malaysian
- Party: SUPP
- Other political affiliations: Barisan Nasional (till 2018); Gabungan Parti Sarawak (since 2018)
- Education: Kolej DPAH Abdillah; University of Selangor
- Occupation: Politician

Billy anak Sujang is a Malaysian politician from SUPP. He has served as the Member of the Sarawak State Legislative Assembly for Opar since 2021.

== Election result ==
Sarawak State Legislative Assembly
Year	Constituency	Candidate	Votes	Pct.	Opponent(s)	Votes	Pct.	Ballots cast	Majority	Turnout
2021	N01 Opar	Billy Sujang (SUPP)	3,659	46.77%	Ranum Mina (PSB)	1,970	25.18%	7,958	1,689	69.59%
2021	N01 Opar	Billy Sujang (SUPP)	3,659	46.77%	Freedy Misid (PBK)	1,487	19.01%	7,958	1,689	69.59%
2021	N01 Opar	Billy Sujang (SUPP)	3,659	46.77%	Meneng Biris (PKR)	327	4.18%	7,958	1,689	69.59%
2021	N01 Opar	Billy Sujang (SUPP)	3,659	46.77%	Saini Kakong (PBDS Baru)	220	2.81%	7,958	1,689	69.59%
2021	N01 Opar	Billy Sujang (SUPP)	3,659	46.77%	Bayang Telon (SEDAR)	160	2.05%	7,958	1,689	69.59%
