= Lawas (state constituency) =

State constituency in Sarawak, Malaysia

Sarawak constituency

Defunct state constituency
- Legislature: Sarawak State Legislative Assembly
- Constituency created: 1968
- Constituency abolished: 2006
- First contested: 1969
- Last contested: 2001

Lawas was a state constituency in Sarawak, Malaysia, that was represented in the Sarawak State Legislative Assembly from 1969 to 2006.

The state constituency was created in the 1968 redistribution and was mandated to return a single member to the Sarawak State Legislative Assembly under the first past the post voting system.

== History ==
It was abolished in 2006 after it was redistributed.

=== Representation history ===
Members of the Legislative Assembly for Lawas
Assembly	No	Years	Member	Party
Constituency created
8th	N48	1970-1973	Awang Daud Pengiran Matusin	BUMIPUTERA
8th	N48	1973-1974	Awang Daud Pengiran Matusin	BN (PBB)
9th	N48	1974-1979	Awang Daud Pengiran Matusin	BN (PBB)
10th	N48	1979-1983	Noor Tahir	BN (PBB)
11th	N48	1983-1987	Noor Tahir	BN (PBB)
12th	N48	1987-1991	Tengah Ali Hassin	BN (PBB)
13th	N56	1991-1996	Tengah Ali Hassin	BN (PBB)
14th	N61	1996-2001	Tengah Ali Hassin	BN (PBB)
15th	N61	2001-2006	Tengah Ali Hassin	BN (PBB)
Constituency abolished, renamed to Bukit Sari

== Election results ==
Sarawak state election, 2001
Party	Candidate	Votes	%	∆%
BN	Tengah Ali Hassin	6,299	95.61	
PKR	Japar Suyut	289	4.39	
Total valid votes		6,588	100.00	
Total rejected ballots		64		
Unreturned ballots		14		
Turnout		6,666	67.18	
Registered electors		9,922		
Majority		6,010	91.23	
BN hold		Swing		

Sarawak state election, 1996
Party	Candidate	Votes	%	∆%
On the nomination day, Tengah Ali Hassin won uncontested.
BN	Tengah Ali Hassin			
Total valid votes			100.00	
Total rejected ballots				
Unreturned ballots				
Turnout				
Registered electors		10,121		
Majority				
BN hold		Swing		

Sarawak state election, 1991
Party	Candidate	Votes	%	∆%
BN	Tengah Ali Hassin	6,076	71.41	▲19.20
PBDS	Baru Bian	2,433	28.59	▲28.59
Total valid votes		8,509	100.00	
Total rejected ballots		92		
Unreturned ballots		18		
Turnout		8,619	74.10	▲1.87
Registered electors		11,632		
Majority		3,643	42.81	▲31.45
BN hold		Swing		

Sarawak state election, 1987
Party	Candidate	Votes	%	∆%
BN	Tengah Ali Hassin	3,722	52.21	▼15.68
Independent	Michael Labo Buaye	2,912	40.85	▲8.73
PERMAS	Awangku Yusof Pengiran Bongsu	495	6.94	▲6.94
Total valid votes		7,129	100.00	
Total rejected ballots		50		
Unreturned ballots		0		
Turnout		7,179	72.22	▼3.77
Registered electors		9,940		
Majority		810	11.36	▼24.41
BN hold		Swing		

Sarawak state election, 1983
Party	Candidate	Votes	%	∆%
BN	Noor Tahir	4,194	67.89	▲4.24
Independent	Pagag Agong	1,984	32.11	▲29.43
Total valid votes		6,178	100.00	
Total rejected ballots		149		
Unreturned ballots		0		
Turnout		6,327	75.99	▼0.41
Registered electors		8,326		
Majority		2,210	35.77	▼6.56
BN hold		Swing		

Sarawak state election, 1979
Party	Candidate	Votes	%	∆%
BN	Noor Tahir	3,246	63.65	▼6.54
Independent	Panai Siger	1,087	21.31	▲21.31
Independent	Loh Teng Kong	537	10.53	▲10.53
Independent	Yusup Buaya	137	2.69	▲2.69
PAJAR	Mansor Osman	93	1.82	▲1.82
Total valid votes		5,100	100.00	
Total rejected ballots		115		
Unreturned ballots		0		
Turnout		5,215	76.40	▼2.16
Registered electors		6,826		
Majority		2,159	42.33	▲1.96
BN hold		Swing		

Sarawak state election, 1974
Party	Candidate	Votes	%	∆%
BN	Awang Daud Pengiran Matusin	3,461	70.19	▲70.19
SNAP	Balang Itai @ Leo Balang	1,470	29.81	▼4.00
Total valid votes		4,931	100.00	
Total rejected ballots		30		
Unreturned ballots		0		
Turnout		4,961	78.56	▼5.88
Registered electors		6,315		
Majority		1,991	40.38	▲35.19
BN gain from PBB		Swing		?

Sarawak state election, 1969
Party	Candidate	Votes	%
PBB	Awang Daud Pengiran Matusin	1,698	39.01
SNAP	Pudun Rangat	1,472	33.82
PESAKA	Racha Umong	1,053	24.19
Independent	Ling Tung Kien	82	1.88
Independent	Mah Chuan Sin	48	1.10
Total valid votes		4,353	100.00
Total rejected ballots		190	
Unreturned ballots		0	
Turnout		4,543	84.44
Registered electors		5,380	
Majority		226	5.19
This was a new constituency created.
