= Malaysian Dayak Congress =

Malaysian Dayak Congress Kongres Dayak Malaysia MDC
- Abbreviation: MDC
- President: Nicholas Bawin ak Anggat (Pro Tem President)
- Founded: Registration submitted (6 May 2005)
- Legalised: Registration rejected (19 July 2006)
- Dissolved: Registration abandoned (28 June 2008)
- Split from: Parti Bansa Dayak Sarawak (PBDS)
- Succeeded by: Parti Bansa Dayak Sarawak Baru (PBDS Baru)
- Headquarters: Kuching
- Ideology: Dayak minority politics
- Colours: Black, yellow, red

Website
- Facebook MDC

The Malaysian Dayak Congress (MDC) or Malay: Kongres Dayak Malaysia is a political party in based in Sarawak, Malaysia representing the Dayak indigenous population. The MDC submitted the relevant documents to the Registrar of Societies (ROS) for registration on 6 May 2005. It is formed by group of supporters and leaders of the deregistered and defunct Parti Bansa Dayak Sarawak (PBDS) where most of them are supporters of the ex-Deputy President of PBDS, Datuk Seri Daniel Tajem who has involved in the 2003-2004 internal party leadership crisis. As a result of the tussle of the PBDS internal leadership which Daniel Tajem supposedly take over but was disagreed by the party information chief, Daniel Tajem has caused PBDS to deregistered twice; on 5 December 2003 and 21 October 2004 by ROS. After the crisis and dissolution of PBDS, James Jemut Masing's group has formed and founded a new party Sarawak People's Party (PRS) that has joined the Barisan Nasional (BN) coalition. Meanwhile attempt for the registration of MDC by Daniel Tajem's group was declined by the Ministry of Home Affairs (KDN) through its letters dated 9 April 2008 informing ROS decision on 19 July 2006 has rejected MDC application due to "Public Order and Security" under Article 7 of Societies Act 1966. The pro tem committee of MDC has submitted their appeal on 12 August 2006, however up until now, the party never received its status as legal political party's status in Malaysia from ROS. The delay and reluctance of ROS to approve the registration of MDC has caused its pro tem committee deadlocked in their effort since they decided not to bring their case to the Judicial Court and just to leave their fate to god and ROS on 28 June 2008.

In the aftermath of MDC fail registration, there was also continue attempt to revive the PBDS and it was finally successfully approved and re-registered as Parti Bansa Dayak Sarawak (Baru) in 2013.

== See also ==
- Politics of Malaysia
- List of political parties in Malaysia
