= 2006 Sarawak state election =

Malaysian state legislative election

- 20 May 2006

All 71 seats in the Sarawak State Legislative Assembly 36 seats needed for a majority
- Registered: 873,703
- Turnout: 552,350 (63.18%)
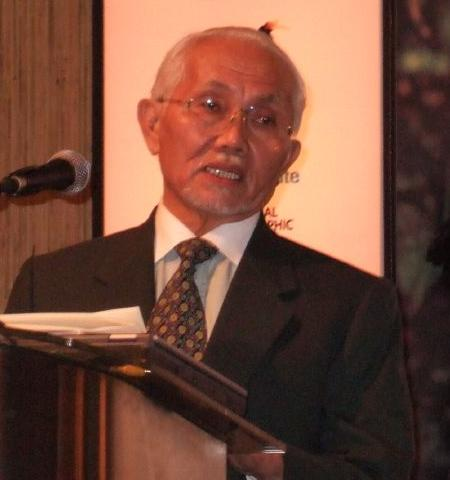
	Majority party	Minority party	Third party
		DAP	SNAP
Leader	Abdul Taib Mahmud	Wong Ho Leng	Edwin Dundang Bugak
Party	BN	DAP	SNAP
Leader since	26 March 1981	12 February 2001	18 May 2003
Leader's seat	Balingian	Bukit Assek	Bukit Saban (lost)
Last election	60 seats, 71.2%	1 seat, 8.4%	6 seats, 5.5% (part of Barisan Nasional)
Seats before	60	1	6
Seats won	62	6	1
Seat change	▲2	▲5	▼5
Popular vote	341,587	82,134	51,459
Percentage	63.0%	15.1%	9.5%
Swing	▼8.2%	▲6.7%	▲4.0%
Chief Minister before election
Abdul Taib Mahmud
BN
Subsequent chief minister
Abdul Taib Mahmud
BN

The ninth Sarawak state election was held on Saturday, 20 May 2006 with nomination day on Tuesday, 9 May 2006. The election functioned to elect 71 representatives to the Sarawak State Assembly (Dewan Undangan Negeri in Malay). The eighth state assembly was dissolved by Yang di-Pertua Negeri Sarawak, Tun Abang Muhammad Salahuddin Abang Barieng by the advice of Chief Minister Abdul Taib Mahmud, on 24 April 2006.

On nomination day, Barisan Nasional won two seats without contest.

This election has an electoral roll of count of 892,537 but with two uncontested seats, total voters in contested constituencies is 873,703.

The previous state election was held in 2001, when the ruling Barisan Nasional (BN) won 60 out of 62 seats in the eighth state assembly. The Democratic Action Party won one, while another went to an independent candidate. The eighth state assembly's mandate would expire on 18 November 2006, necessitating the calling of an election beforehand.

Barisan Nasional fielded candidates for all 71 seats:

- 35 seats by United Traditional Bumiputera Party (PBB)
- 19 seats by Sarawak United People's Party (SUPP)
- 9 seats by Sarawak Peoples Party (PRS)
- 8 seats by Sarawak Progressive Democratic Party (SPDP)

A total of 29 seats was contested by Sarawak National Party (SNAP), followed by People's Justice Party (PKR) (25 seats), Democratic Action Party (DAP) (12 seats), and Pan-Malaysian Islamic Party (1 seat). There were 20 independents contesting for 16 seats.

== Background ==
Sarawak is the largest state in Malaysia, comprising 124,450 square kilometers, almost as large as the Malay Peninsula. In 1963, Sarawak and Sabah together with the Federation of Malaya formed a greater federation named Malaysia. Since then, Sarawak nationalism dominates in every state election. The people of Sarawak generally resented the control of the Malay Peninsula on Sarawak affairs such as autonomy in decision making, dissatisfaction over the 5% allocation of oil royalty to Sarawak, and the tendencies to support local parties in Sarawak.

Since rural areas dominated Sarawak lands, the control over the rural areas is essential for electoral successes. In the 1990s, deforestation in Sarawak became a major issue whereby logging companies with close political ties to the regime were given large amount of concessions for logging. As the source of timber in Sarawak forests became depleted, oil palm plantations became a priority. The Sarawak government had encroached on the Native customary rights (NCR) lands to convert them into state lands for logging, plantations, and infrastructure developments. In return, the government promised infrastructure projects that can benefit the rural community. However, tenders for the infrastructure projects were also awarded according to party lines. Poverty in the rural areas had fostered dependence on government handouts, thus rural communities showed more loyalty to the government when compared to urban areas.

Sarawak is ethnically diverse. The Iban people is the largest group, followed by Chinese, Malay, Melanau people, Bidayuh, and Orang Ulu. The Ibans are primarily located in rural areas, the Chinese is primarily located in the urban areas; Bidayuh was traditionally rural but has been increasingly urbanised. Since the 1970s, the chief minister of Sarawak traditionally come from Melanau ethnic group. Similar to Peninsular Malaysia, delineation of constituencies and campaign issues are organised along racial lines.

== Electoral system ==
Since formation of Malaysia in 1963, Sarawak has hold nine state elections. Since 1979, Sarawak hold state elections separately from the national parliamentary elections. Thus, Sarawak elections become a measure of support of the incumbent government before the next Malaysian general elections. Malaysian electoral system uses the first-past-the-post voting system, where winners take all. Therefore, Sarawak BN consistently won greater proportion of seats than the share of popular vote. Election Commission of Malaysia (EC) had been alleged to be politically aligned with the incumbent government since 1961. The chairman of EC is appointed by the incumbent government and is answerable to the Malaysian prime minister department.

== Nomination ==
The Sarawak State Legislative Assembly was dissolved by chief minister Abdul Taib Mahmud. The nomination date was set on 9 May 2006 with campaign period set from 10 to 19 May. This election also saw larger number of women candidates being fielded by both government and opposition parties. BN nominated six women candidates while the opposition slated four women candidates. BN has introduced 18 new faces in the election.

There were only a total of 892,537 registered voters in this election, which was less than a third of the 2.5 million total population in Sarawak.

Out of 71 seats, only 69 seats saw contests between various candidates. Two seats – namely Daro and Dalat – were won uncontested by candidates from Parti Pesaka Bumiputra Bersatu, a component party in Barisan Nasional.

== Parties and leaders ==
=== Government ===
Sarawak Barisan Nasional (BN) coalition and its predecessor Alliance has been securing decisive victories in every state elections since the formation of Malaysia. Sarawak is also one of the five states in Malaysia where the governing BN coalition secured more than 90% of the seats in almost every election. Other states are: Malacca, Perlis, Negeri Sembilan, and Johor. Sarawak BN consists of entirely local parties: United Traditional Bumiputera Party (PBB), Sarawak United People's Party (SUPP), Sarawak Peoples Party (PRS), and Sarawak Progressive Democratic Party (SPDP). Sarawak chief minister Abdul Taib Mahmud is the president of PBB. He is also the chairman of Sarawak BN. His party consists of Malay-Melanau party members. SUPP is predominantly Chinese, although the party also has several Iban members. PRS is the combination of Iban and Chinese members while SPDP is predominantly Iban. Both PRS and SPDP are either direct or indirect splinter parties from Sarawak National Party (SNAP).

=== Opposition ===
Sarawak National Party (SNAP) was a component party in Sarawak BN in 2001. However, in 2002, SNAP was grippled by a leadership crisis. It was later deregistered by the Malaysian Registrar of Societies (ROS) on 5 November 2002 due to the persistent unresolved leadership crisis. The party then filed a judicial review against the ROS decision. The review was dismissed by the High Court in September 2006. During the 2002 SNAP crisis, Sarawak Progressive Democratic Party (SPDP) was formed and admitted into Sarawak BN. SNAP then departed from BN and became an opposition party in 2004. In the same year, another component party of Sarawak BN, Parti Bangsa Dayak Sarawak (PBDS), which was a splinter party from SNAP in 1983, faced a leadership crisis and was deregistered. Sarawak Peoples Party (PRS) was formed later and admitted into Sarawak BN.

Amongst all the opposition parties in Sarawak, only Democratic Action Party (DAP) has a seat in Kidurong since 2001 election. DAP had left Barisan Alternatif (BA) before the 2001 election. It has reached an informal agreement with People's Justice Party (PKR) for the latter to contest at Padungan in return for not contesting against DAP in 2004 Malaysian general election.

Meanwhile, People's Justice Party (PKR) together with Sarawak National Party (SNAP) teamed up to form the Sarawak United Front (Barisan Bersatu Sarawak, BBS). Malaysian Dayak Congress (MDC), being one of the two parties split from the deregistered PBDS in 2004, was awaiting for registration approval from ROS. Therefore, BBS had allowed candidates from MDC to use SNAP party symbol to contest in this election. Meanwhile, Malaysian Islamic Party (PAS) decided to contest in only one seat in view of voters base in Sarawak mainly consists of non-Muslims.

Most of the seats saw two corner fights with the agreement of the opposition on not contesting against each other. The number of independent candidates also dropped from the last election where only 15 seats saw the participation of the independent candidates.

== Campaign ==
=== Barisan Nasional ===
The BN government lifted the ban of helicopter flights to ease the dissemination of manifestos in the rural areas. Sarawak BN mainly campaigned on theme of "development and stability" with messages such as "A Peaceful, Progressive and Prosperous Sarawak". BN put heavy emphasis on rural development in terms on agricultural expansion such as palm oil, pepper, and cocoa. It is stressed that continued rural development is depended upon the rural voters' political loyalty. For example, chief minister Taib Mahmud had spoken the following words to the voters at Bekenu:

It is the policy of the government to always help the people, and that is why we have a development plan. Since the First Malaysia Plan (1MP), the government has spent hundreds of billions of ringgit to provide the infrastructure and basic amenities for the rakyat (people). They [the opposition] have no capital to help the people so they spread lies, but do you want to wait another 50 years to see development to your area?”

— by Abdul Taib Mahmud

Sarawak government allocated projects under the SALCRA agency (Sarawak Land Consolidation and Rehabilitation Authority) in rural areas. Rural Growth Centres (RGC) were also opened throughout Sarawak. These centres were aimed to "create job opportunities and income". A total of RM 2.12 billion (US$0.57 billion) would be allocated exclusively for rural development. BN also linked Ninth Malaysia Plan to Sarawak development. The Malaysian federal government allocated RM 13.4 billion (US$3.62 billion) to win support in this campaign. For example, Plantation Industries and Commodities Minister Peter Chin announced his plans of boosting cocoa and pepper production in Sarawak. Awang Tengah, a senior politician from Parti Pesaka Bumiputera Bersatu (PBB) highlighated the RM400 million (US$108 million) allocation for Rural Electrification Scheme (RES) in Sarawak. Samy Vellu, Malaysian Minister of Works announced allocations for upgrading Mambong-Sejingkat road (Kuching), Miri-Lutong road (Miri), Limbang-Lawas road, and an elevated road in Miri.

A PBB leader named Abdul Wahab Aziz stressed that Mukah and Balingian only got development when Taib Mahmud represented Balingian since 2001. Since the discovery of coal in Mukah, a coal power plant was built in Balingian, an oil palm plantation was planted in Mukah, and a deep sea fishing port was built at Tanjung Manis. In Ba'kelalan (near Indonesian border of Kalimantan), BN candidate Nelson Balang emphasised regarding the risk of them being left behind for 10 to 20 years if they do not vote for BN in the next five years. The issue of connectivity of Ba'kelalan to other towns in Sarawak had also been highlighted. A road project was also politicised in Bekenu (near Miri). Besides, BN also emphasized on the importance of political stability in bringing developments to the people while saying the opposition only bring chaos to the community. Politicians from BN coalition also argued that supporting BN is also necessary in maintaining Sarawak's autonomy in decision making and with local leaders in control because Sarawak BN are consisted of local parties. A vote for the opposition will let Peninsular Malaysia to have more control over Sarawak. This election was also portrayed as the last election for the chief minister Abdul Taib Mahmud. The election day coincidentally fell on the date of his birthday. Therefore, Sarawak BN regularly featured a headline read as "Give CM special birthday gift" on newspapers.

=== Opposition parties ===
Sarawak National Party (SNAP) campaigned on the Native Customary Rights (NCR) platform, arguing that BN has not been respecting Dayak NCR rights while using their lands in various development platforms. SNAP has been focusing on personalities of a Dayak long-time leader Daniel Tajem, however Daniel lost the Balai Ringin constituency eventually. Meanwhile, Parti Keadilan Rakyat (PKR) emphasized on good governance with less corruption, better human rights protection, lower inflation, and equitable allocation of resources. PKR national advisor Anwar Ibrahim came to Sarawak for three days and highlighted these issues during his campaign. The meagre 5% oil royalty, removal of fuel subsidies, and uncertainty associated with the renewal of the 60-year land lease among the urban residents were highlighted during the PKR campaign. The PKR campaign was relied heavily on machinery and resources from Peninsular Malaysia. Malaysian Islamic Party (PAS) also emphasized on similar issues with endorsement on Islamic governance. Although PAS only focus on one constituency, their own PAS candidate was not loyal to the party. Therefore, the candidate did not receive the required amount of support from party leadership to campaign.

Democratic Action Party (DAP) has the strongest campaign amongst all the opposition parties. They portrayed themselves as the watchdog of the government with the themes "Enough is enough" and "Sarawak deserves better". They also presented themselves as the probable alternative with a united team to the urban Chinese voters. Price hikes, land lease renewal problems, and corruption issues were highlighted. In response to opposition accusations, BN "approved" 835 owners in Sibu and 85 owners in Kuching to renew their land leases but only with the final approval from the Sarawak Land and Survey Department and the fees were not announced. BN labelled the oppositions such as DAP, PKR, and PAS as "West Malaysia opportunists", "liars" and "rejects". They even labelled DAP as "dangerous and poisonous". BN also labelled the opposition as the transversities welcoming Anwar Ibrahim at Kuching airport. Meanwhile, the opposition lashed back and lablled BN as "Barang Naik" (goods increase") in reference to inflation of prices of daily necessities under BN governance. The opposition also attacked the character of the chief minister Taib Mahmud. The largest opposition public meeting on the night before the polling day was at Kings Centre Shopping Plaza at Kuching, with over 5,000 voters.

== Polling ==
On the polling day, 63.2% of the registered voters went our for voting. The election commission spent RM 31 million in this election. They used 3,889 land vehicles, 1,007 boats and 48 speedboats to reach the 1,705 polling centres staffed with 14,571 officers, 71 returning officers and 170 assistant returning officers. Voters from rural areas such as Ba'kelalan and Telang Usan went to polls early in the morning and the polling was stopped at noon with certain polling stations opened for half an hour. DAP, SNAP, and PKR parties were able to put more polling agents to supervise voting counting at polling stations. There was no incidence of violence reported. The polling day was peaceful.

== Results ==
By 8 pm on the same day, results started to pour in with overall results known by midnight. Barisan successfully captured 61 seats out of 71 seats, but lost a total of nine seats; eight seats to opposition and one seat to an independent. Meanwhile, the opposition managed to captured 8 seats. This was the first time since the 1987 election that the opposition made a significant inroad in a state election. SUPP, a component party in the BN coalition, is the biggest loser as it lost six seats to DAP in Chinese urban areas. SUPP almost lost all the seats in the Kuching city (Padungan, Pending, Kota Sentosa, and Batu Lintang) but able to retain one seat Batu Kawah. Meanwhile, twenty one candidates lost their deposits (garnered less than 1/8 of the total votes cast), mostly independents.

BN was managed to secure 63.0% of the popular vote in this election, a significant reduction when compared to 71.2% in the last election. Meanwhile, the opposition together won 37.1% of the popular vote. BN experienced a general drop in support from multiple ethnic groups, with the biggest loss of support from the Chinese. Younger generation have more tendency to support the opposition than the older generation. Poorer voters tend to be more receptive of the BN development promises while wealthier voters tend to sympathise the opposition. BN suffered an average of five percent decline in vote share across all constituencies. BN suffered 19 percent decline in Chinese majority seats, four percent decline in Iban and Bidayuh seats, six percent decline in mixed constituencies, and two percent increase in Malay-Melanau areas.

According to political scientist Bridget Welsh, the loss of BN support in Sarawak was attributed partially to national issues such as fuel price hike, high electricity tariffs, increased inflation, slowing of reform, and the lack of direction by the Abdullah Ahmad Badawi administration. As the media become more open under Abdullah administration, voters gain more access to information, including the opposition; thus favouring the chances of the opposition in this election. Locally, chief minister Taib long tenure in office and his exertion of political power in economy through firms allegedly linked to his family members and associates have raised concerns amongst the voters. Lack of job opportunities in the state led to out-migration of the younger people. The Chinese questioned the voice of SUPP within Sarawak BN. The SUPP handling of land leases involving oil palm plantations was seen as benefiting only a selected few and did not contribute to a wider Chinese community. Factional infighting amongst the SUPP led to sabotage of candidates during the election. DAP was seen as offering a more dynamic range of younger candidates when compared to SUPP which offered only old candidates.

=== Summary ===
Party or alliance		Votes	%	Seats	+/–
Barisan Nasional	Parti Pesaka Bumiputera Bersatu	160,331	29.55	35	+5
Barisan Nasional	Sarawak United Peoples' Party	113,505	20.92	11	-5
Barisan Nasional	Sarawak Progressive Democratic Party	34,737	6.40	8	New
Barisan Nasional	Parti Rakyat Sarawak	33,014	6.08	8	New
Barisan Nasional	Total	341,587	62.95	62	0
Democratic Action Party		82,134	15.14	6	+5
Sarawak National Party		51,459	9.48	1	-5
People's Justice Party		47,350	8.73	1	+1
Pan-Malaysian Islamic Party		1,901	0.35	0	0
Independents		18,213	3.36	1	0
Total		542,644	100.00	71	+9
Valid votes		542,644	98.30		
Invalid/blank votes		9,386	1.70		
Total votes		552,030	100.00		
Registered voters/turnout		873,703	63.18		

The above registered voter count represents total electorate of contested constituencies. Total electorate for Sarawak 2006 is 892,537 where this includes 2 uncontested seats. The invalid vote count includes 6959 Rejected Votes and 2427 Unreturned Ballots.

=== Results by constituency ===
No.	State constituency	Elected state assembly members	Elected party
BN 62 | DAP 6 | PKR 1 | SNAP 1 | IND 1
N01	Opar	Ranum Mina	BN (SUPP)
N02	Tasik Biru	Peter Nansian Ngusie	BN (SPDP)
N03	Tanjong Datu	Adenan Satem	BN (PBB)
N04	Pantai Damai	Abdul Rahman Junaidi	BN (PBB)
N05	Demak Laut	Abg. Abdul Rauf Abg. Zen	BN (PBB)
N06	Tupong	Daud Abdul Rahman	BN (PBB)
N07	Samariang	Sharifah Hasidah Sayeed Aman Ghazali	BN (PBB)
N08	Satok	Abang Abdul Rahman Zohari Abang Openg	BN (PBB)
N09	Padungan	Dominique Ng Kim Ho	PKR
N10	Pending	Violet Yong Wui Wui	DAP
N11	Batu Lintang	Voon Lee Shan	DAP
N12	Kota Sentosa	Chong Chieng Jen	DAP
N13	Batu Kawa	Tan Joo Phoi	BN (SUPP)
N14	Asajaya	Abdul Karim Rahman Hamzah	BN (PBB)
N15	Muara Tuang	Mohamad Ali Mahmud	BN (PBB)
N16	Bengoh	Jerip Susil	BN (SUPP)
N17	Tarat	Roland Sagah Wee Inn	BN (PBB)
N18	Tebedu	Michael Manyin Jawong	BN (PBB)
N19	Kedup	Federick Bayoi Manggie	BN (PBB)
N20	Sadong Jaya	Wan Abd. Wahab Wan Sanusi	BN (PBB)
N21	Simunjan	Mohd. Naroden Majais	BN (PBB)
N22	Sebuyau	Julaihi Narawi	BN (PBB)
N23	Lingga	Simoi Peri	BN (PBB)
N24	Beting-Maro	Bolhassan Di	BN (PBB)
N25	Balai Ringin	Snowdan Lawan	BN (PRS)
N26	Bukit Begunan	Mong Dagang	BN (PRS)
N27	Simanggang	Francis Harden Hollis	BN (SUPP)
N28	Engkilili	Johnichal Rayong	SNAP
N29	Batang Air	Dublin Unting Ingkot	BN (PRS)
N30	Saribas	Wahbi Junaidi	BN (PBB)
N31	Layar	Alfred Jabu Numpang	BN (PBB)
N32	Bukit Saban	Robert Lawson Chuat Vincent	BN (PBB)
N33	Kalaka	Abdul Wahab Aziz	BN (PBB)
N34	Krian	Peter Nyarok Entrie	BN (SPDP)
N35	Belawai	Hamden Ahmad	BN (PBB)
N36	Semop	Mohd. Asfia Awang Nassar	BN (PBB)
N37	Daro	Murni Suhaili	BN (PBB)
N38	Jemoreng	Abu Seman Jahwie	BN (PBB)
N39	Jepok	David Teng Lung Chi	BN (SUPP)
N40	Meradong	Ting Tze Fui	DAP
N41	Pakan	William Mawan Ikom	BN (SPDP)
N42	Meluan	Wong Judat	BN (SPDP)
N43	Ngemah	Gabriel Adit Demong	IND
N44	Machan	Gramong Juna	BN (PBB)
N45	Bukit Assek	Wong Ho Leng	DAP
N46	Dudong	Soon Choon Teck	BN(SUPP)
N47	Bawang Assan	Wong Soon Koh	BN (SUPP)
N48	Pelawan	Vincent Goh Chung Siong	BN (SUPP)
N49	Nangka	Awg. Bemee Awg. Ali Basah	BN (PBB)
N50	Dalat	Fatimah Abdullah	BN (PBB)
N51	Balingian	Abdul Taib Mahmud	BN (PBB)
N52	Tamin	Joseph Mauh Ikeh	BN (PRS)
N53	Kakus	John Sikie Tayai	BN (PRS)
N54	Pelagus	Larry Sng Wei Shien	BN (PRS)
N55	Katibas	Ambrose Blikau Enturan	BN (PBB)
N56	Baleh	James Jemut Masing	BN (PRS)
N57	Belaga	Liwan Lagang	BN (PRS)
N58	Jepak	Talib Zulpilip	BN (PBB)
N59	Kidurong	Chiew Chin Sing	DAP
N60	Kemena	Stephen Rundi Utom	BN (PBB)
N61	Bekenu	Rosey Yunus	BN (SPDP)
N62	Lambir	Aidan Wing	BN (PBB)
N63	Piasau	George Chan Hong Nam	BN (SUPP)
N64	Pujut	Andy Chia Chu Fatt	BN (SUPP)
N65	Senadin	Lee Kim Shin	BN (SUPP)
N66	Marudi	Sylvester Entrie Muran	BN (SPDP)
N67	Telang Usan	Lihan Jok	BN (PBB)
N68	Bukit Kota	Abdul Rahman Ismail	BN (PBB)
N69	Batu Danau	Palu @ Paulus Gumbang	BN (SPDP)
N70	Ba'kelalan	Nelson Balang Rining	BN (SPDP)
N71	Bukit Sari	Awang Tengah Ali Hasan	BN(PBB)

== Controversies ==
During this election, DAP had made police reports at Opar, Balai Ringin, and Saribas for alleged vote-buying. The opposition also protested on postal votes that greatly favoured the incumbent government. Sarawak BN also used government machinery such as government vehicles and public officials during campaign. Public officials were expected to be rewarded for helping BN during campaign. The Sarawak media were also expected to feature news favouring the incumbent government. An NGO named "The Malaysians for Free and Fair Elections" (MAFREL) raised concerns on the discrepancies in the electoral roll where voters were registered without addresses, and a case of voter impersonation was recorded.

== Aftermath ==
After the election, both BN and the opposition tried to build momentum in the next general election, with DAP being more optimistic about its outcomes. SUPP lost the mayoralty of the Kuching South City Council (MBKS) after their devastating defeat in the Kuching city. The mayor of the Kuching South was usually a political appointee from SUPP.

Johnichal Rayong, who won the N28 Engkilili seat on SNAP ticket, joined SUPP in December 2010, contributed another seat for BN. Dublin Unting, the state assemblyman for N29 Batang Ai, died at the Normah Medical Specialist Centre, Kuching on 24 February 2009 after a coma. This resulted in the necessity to call for a by-election. Malcolm Mussen Lamoh later successfully defended the seat for Barisan Nasional. Gabriel Adit Demong previously an independent for N43 Ngemah constituency joined PKR in November 2008. He later quit PKR and joined Parti Cinta Malaysia in December 2009. Larry Sng, who won the N54 Pelagus seat for BN, was sacked by Sarawak Peoples Party (PRS) in 2007. Although partyless, Sng is regarded as a loyal member of BN by Abdul Taib Mahmud, the chairman of Sarawak BN coalition.
