= 2001 Sarawak state election =

Malaysian state legislative election

- 27 September 2001

All 62 seats in the Sarawak State Legislative Assembly 32 seats needed for a majority
- Registered: 815,932
- Turnout: 546,851 (67.02%)
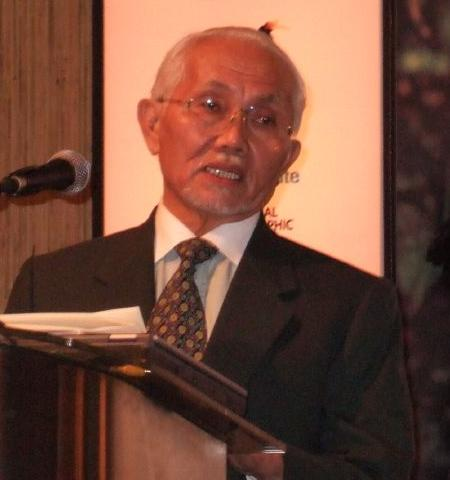
	Majority party	Minority party
		DAP
Leader	Abdul Taib Mahmud	Wong Ho Leng
Party	BN	DAP
Leader since	26 March 1981	12 February 2001
Leader's seat	Balingian	Bukit Assek (lost)
Last election	57 seats, 66.6%	3 seats, 8.9%
Seats before	57	3
Seats won	60	1
Seat change	▲3	▼2
Popular vote	382,227	45,327
Percentage	71.2%	8.4%
Swing	▲4.6%	▼0.4%
Chief Minister before election
Abdul Taib Mahmud
BN
Subsequent chief minister
Abdul Taib Mahmud
BN

The eighth Sarawak state election was held on Thursday, 27 September 2001 with nomination date on Tuesday, 18 September 2001. The state assembly was supposed to be expired on 18 November 2001 but it was dissolved by the governor of Sarawak 2 months earlier on 3 September 2001.

The election saw 815,932 citizens eligible to vote but only 67.02% of the total voters or 546,851 voters had turned up to vote in this election.

There were 171 candidates pursuing for 62 state seats in Sarawak. Sarawak Barisan Nasional (National Front) won 60 out of 62 seats while the remaining two seats were won by Democratic Action Party (DAP) and independent respectively.

== Results ==
=== Summary ===
Party or alliance		Votes	%	Seats	+/–
Barisan Nasional	Parti Pesaka Bumiputera Bersatu	174,699	32.53	30	+1
Barisan Nasional	Sarawak United Peoples' Party	143,593	26.74	16	+3
Barisan Nasional	Sarawak National Party	29,329	5.46	6	–2
Barisan Nasional	Parti Bansa Dayak Sarawak	34,606	6.44	8	+1
Barisan Nasional	Total	382,227	71.17	60	+3
Democratic Action Party		45,327	8.44	1	–2
National Justice Party		37,244	6.93	0	New
State Reform Party		12,211	2.27	0	New
Pan-Malaysian Islamic Party		2,854	0.53	0	0
Independents		57,220	10.65	1	–1
Total		537,083	100.00	62	0
Valid votes		537,083	98.21		
Invalid/blank votes		9,768	1.79		
Total votes		546,851	100.00		
Registered voters/turnout		815,932	67.02		

The above registered voter count represents total electorate of contested constituencies. Total electorate for Sarawak 2001 is 868487 where this includes 4 uncontested seats. The invalid vote count includes 7073 Rejected Votes and 2695 Unreturned Ballots.

=== Results by constituency ===
4 state seats were won unopposed by Sarawak National Front on the nomination day. They were:

N11. Batu Kawah – Alfred Yap Chin Loi by Sarawak United Peoples' Party (SUPP)

N25. Batang Ai – Dublin Unting anak Ingkot by Sarawak Dayak People's Party (PBDS)

N49. Katibas – Ambrose Blikau by United Traditional Bumiputera Party (PBB)

N62. Ba'kelalan – Dr Judson Tagal by Sarawak National Party (SNAP)

There were two election petitions filed to the Sarawak high court for N48 Pelagus and N60 Limbang constituency respectively after the election.

The full list of representatives is shown below:

No.	State Constituency	Elected state assembly members	Elected party
BN 60 | DAP 1 | KeADILan 0 | PAS 0 | STAR 0 | IND 1
N01	Tanjung Datu	Ranum Mina	BN (SUPP)
N02	Tasik Biru	Peter Nansian Ngusie	BN (SNAP)
N03	Pantai Damai	Abdul Rahman Junaidi	BN (PBB)
N04	Demak Laut	Abang Draup Zamahari @ Abang Abdul Rauf Abang Zen	BN (PBB)
N05	Tupong	Daud Abdul Rahman	BN (PBB)
N06	Satok	Abang Johari Abang Openg	BN (PBB)
N07	Samariang	Sharifah Mordiah Tuanku Fauzi	BN (PBB)
N08	Padungan	Lily Yong Lee Lee	BN (SUPP)
N09	Pending	Sim Kheng Hui	BN (SUPP)
N10	Batu Lintang	Chan Seng Khai	BN (SUPP)
N11	Batu Kawah	Alfred Yap Chin Loi	BN (SUPP)
N12	Asajaya	Abdul Karim Rahman Hamzah	BN (PBB)
N13	Muara Tuang	Adenan Satem	BN (PBB)
N14	Bengoh	Jerip Susil	BN (SUPP)
N15	Tarat	Roland Sagah	BN (PBB)
N16	Tebedu	Michael Manyin	BN (PBB)
N17	Kedup	Federick Bayoi Manggie	BN (PBB)
N18	Sadong Jaya	Wan Abdul Wahab Wan Sanusi	BN (PBB)
N19	Simunjan	Naroden Majais	BN (PBB)
N20	Sebuyau	Julaihi Narawi	BN (PBB)
N21	Beting Maro	Bolhassan Di	BN (PBB)
N22	Bukit Begunan	Mong Dagang	BN (PBDS)
N23	Simanggang	Francis Harden Hollis	BN (SUPP)
N24	Engkilili	Toh Heng San	BN (SUPP)
N25	Batang Ai	Dublin Unting Ingkot	BN (PBDS)
N26	Saribas	Wahbi Junaidi	BN (PBB)
N27	Layar	Alfred Jabu Numpang	BN (PBB)
N28	Kalaka	Abdul Wahab Aziz	BN (PBB)
N29	Krian	Peter Nyarok Entrie	BN (SNAP)
N30	Belawai	Hamden Ahmad	BN (PBB)
N31	Serdeng	Mohamad Asfia Awang Nasar	BN (PBB)
N32	Matu Daro	Wahab Dolah	BN (PBB)
N33	Meradong	Ting Check Sii	BN (SUPP)
N34	Repok	David Teng Lung Chi	BN (SUPP)
N35	Pakan	William Mawan Ikom	BN (SNAP)
N36	Meluan	Wong Judat	IND
N37	Ngemah	Gabriel Adit Demong	BN (PBDS)
N38	Machan	Gramong Juna	BN (PBB)
N39	Bukit Assek	Daniel Ngieng Kiong Ann	BN (SUPP)
N40	Dudong	Soon Choon Teck	BN (SUPP)
N41	Bawang Assan	Wong Soon Koh	BN (SUPP)
N42	Pelawan	Vincent Goh Chung Siong	BN (SUPP)
N43	Nangka	Awang Bemee Awang Ali Basah	BN (PBB)
N44	Dalat	Fatimah Abdullah	BN (PBB)
N45	Balingian	Abdul Taib Mahmud	BN (PBB)
N46	Tamin	Joseph Entulu Belaun	BN (PBDS)
N47	Kakus	John Sikei Tayai	BN (PBDS)
N48	Pelagus	Larry Soon @ Larry Sng Wei Shien	BN (PBDS)
N49	Katibas	Ambrose Blikau	BN (PBB)
N50	Baleh	James Jemut Masing	BN (PBDS)
N51	Belaga	Stanley Ajang Batok	BN (PBDS)
N52	Kemena	Stephen Rundi Utom	BN (PBB)
N53	Kidurong	Chiew Chiu Sing	DAP
N54	Jepak	Talib Zulpilip	BN (PBB)
N55	Lambir	Aidan Wing	BN (PBB)
N56	Piasau	George Chan Hong Nam	BN (SUPP)
N57	Senadin	Lee Kim Shin	BN (SUPP)
N58	Marudi	Sylvester Entri Muran	BN (SNAP)
N59	Telang Usan	Lihan Jok	BN (PBB)
N60	Limbang	Richard Wong Shoan Fook	BN (SNAP)
N61	Lawas	Awang Tengah Ali Hasan	BN (PBB)
N62	Ba'kelalan	Judson Tagal	BN (SNAP)

== Aftermath ==
Wong Judat, the independent candidate who won the Meluan seat, joined BN through its component party Sarawak Progressive Democratic Party (SPDP), an offshoot of deregistered SNAP, in 2003, 2 years after his victory.
