= List of candidates in the 2016 Sarawak state election =

This is a list of the candidates of the 2016 Sarawak state election.

== Barisan Nasional candidates (82 of 82 seats) ==
This is a list of the candidates who ran for the Barisan Nasional (using the dacing election symbol) in the 11th Sarawak state election. The party ran a full slate of 82, winning 72.

State Constituency	Candidate name	Party	Gender	Residence	Occupation / Notes	Votes	%	Rank
N.01 Opar	Ranum Mina	BN Direct	male			3,665	50.06	1/4
N.02 Tasik Biru	Henry @ Harry Jinep	SPDP	male			6,922	55.13	1/2
N.03 Tanjong Datu	Adenan Satem	PBB	male		BN state chairman	6,360	93.15	1/2
N.04 Pantai Damai	Abdul Rahman Junaidi	PBB	male			10,918	86.82	1/2
N.05 Demak Laut	Hazland Abang Hipni	PBB	male			8,539	88.07	1/2
N.06 Tupong	Fazzrudin Abdul Rahman	PBB	male			10,942	79.12	1/2
N.07 Samariang	Sharifah Hasidah Sayeed Aman Ghazali	PBB	female			9,795	80.16	1/3
N.08 Satok	Abang Abdul Rahman Zohari Abang Openg	PBB	male			6,854	79.12	1/2
N.09 Padungan	Pau Kiu Sung	SUPP	male			5,062	34.89	2/3
N.10 Pending	Milton Foo Tiang Wee	SUPP	male			7,442	37.40	2/2
N.11 Batu Lintang	Sih Hua Tong	SUPP	male			6,373	36.50	2/3
N.12 Kota Sentosa	Yap Yau Sin	SUPP	male			7,228	41.84	2/2
N.13 Batu Kitang	Lo Khere Chiang	SUPP	male			6,466	53.48	1/5
N.14 Batu Kawah	Sim Kui Hian	SUPP	male		SUPP president	6,414	54.12	1/3
N.15 Asajaya	Abdul Karim Rahman Hamzah	PBB	male			6,163	74.72	1/2
N.16 Muara Tuang	Idris Buang	PBB	male			10,086	81.61	1/3
N.17 Stakan	Mohamad Ali Mahmud	PBB	male			8,820	83.22	1/2
N.18 Serembu	Miro Simuh	BN Direct	male			3,452	50.43	1/4
N.19 Mambong	Jerip Susil	BN Direct	male			6,161	52.96	1/3
N.20 Tarat	Roland Sagah Wee Inn	PBB	male			8,450	73.61	1/2
N.21 Tebedu	Michael Manyin Jawong	PBB	male			7,357	86.34	1/2
N.22 Kedup	Maclaine Ben @ Martin Ben	PBB	male			5,769	73.23	1/3
N.23 Bukit Semuja	John Ilus	BN Direct	male			5,451	59.64	1/5
N.24 Sadong Jaya	Aidel Lariwoo	PBB	male			3,925	82.22	1/4
N.25 Simunjan	Awla Dris	PBB	male			4,101	71.14	1/3
N.26 Gedong	Mohd Naroden Majais	PBB	male			4,064	78.77	1/3
N.27 Sebuyau	Julaihi Narawi	PBB	male			4,531	69.88	1/3
N.28 Lingga	Simoi Peri	PBB	female			4,169	66.84	1/3
N.29 Beting Maro	Razaili Gapor	PBB	male			4,758	60.14	1/3
N.30 Balai Ringin	Snowdan Lawan	PRS	male			4,478	58.10	1/4
N.31 Bukit Begunan	Mong Dagang	PRS	male			5,550	86.65	1/2
N.32 Simanggang	Francis Harden Hollis	SUPP	male			4,094	50.70	1/4
N.33 Engkilili	Johnichal Rayong Ngipa	BN Direct	male			5,513	70.75	1/4
N.34 Batang Ai	Malcom Mussen Lamoh	PRS	male			4,884	74.20	1/2
N.35 Saribas	Ricky @ Mohammad Razi Sitam	PBB	male			5,963	79.57	1/2
N.36 Layar	Gerald Rentap Jabu	PBB	male			3,931	61.10	1/2
N.37 Bukit Saban	Douglas Uggah Embas	PBB	male			5,524	85.66	1/2
N.38 Kalaka	Abdul Wahab Aziz	PBB	male			3,988	77.57	1/2
N.39 Krian	Kilat Beriak	SPDP	male			3,748	41.02	2/2
N.40 Kabong	Mohd Chee Kadir	PBB	male			5,069	77.35	1/2
N.41 Kuala Rajang	Talif @ Len Salleh	PBB	male			6,235	88.60	1/3
N.42 Semop	Abdullah Saidol	PBB	male			5,290	85.77	1/2
N.43 Daro	Safiee Ahmad	PBB	male			5,001	89.78	1/2
N.44 Jemoreng	Juanda Jaya	PBB	male			5,084	77.43	1/3
N.45 Repok	Huang Tiong Sii	SUPP	male			7,446	51.96	1/3
N.46 Meradong	Ding Kuong Hiing	SUPP	male			6,865	56.21	1/2
N.47 Pakan	William Mawan Ikom	BN Direct	male		former TERAS president	3,999	50.90	1/3
N.48 Meluan	Rolland Duat Jubin	SPDP	male			3,363	37.40	1/4
N.49 Ngemah	Alexander Vincent	PRS	male			2,888	46.13	1/4
N.50 Machan	Allan Siden Gramong	PBB	male			4,550	60.43	1/3
N.51 Bukit Assek	Chieng Buong Toon	SUPP	male			6,895	36.95	2/3
N.52 Dudong	Tiong Thai King	BN Direct	male			9,700	46.36	1/5
N.53 Bawang Assan	Wong Soon Koh	BN Direct	male		former UPP president	9,015	61.62	1/5
N.54 Pelawan	Lau Ung Hie	BN Direct	female			8,742	39.04	2/3
N.55 Nangka	Annuar Rapaee	PBB	male			9,617	77.62	1/3
N.56 Dalat	Fatimah Abdullah @ Ting Sai Ming	PBB	female			7,107	90.14	1/2
N.57 Tellian	Yussibnosh Balo	PBB	male			5,087	88.42	1/2
N.58 Balingian	Abdul Yakub Arbi	PBB	male			4,208	77.18	1/2
N.59 Tamin	Christopher Gira @ Gira Sambang	PRS	male			6,230	54.99	1/3
N.60 Kakus	John Sikie Tayai	PRS	male			7,054	75.21	1/3
N.61 Pelagus	Wilson Nyabong Ijang	PRS	male			3,778	82.26	1/3
N.62 Katibas	Ambrose Blikau Enturan	PBB	male			4,681	74.20	1/2
N.63 Bukit Goram	Jefferson Jamit Unyat	PBB	male			4,596	69.57	1/2
N.64 Baleh	James Jemut Masing	PRS	male		PRS president	5,272	91.67	1/2
N.65 Belaga	Liwan Lagang	PRS	male			4,149	89.96	1/2
N.66 Murum	Chukpai Ugon	PRS	male			3,265	54.00	1/4
N.67 Jepak	Talib Zulpilip	PBB	male			6,342	68.82	1/5
N.68 Tanjong Batu	Pau Chiong Ung	SUPP	male			5,436	40.24	2/3
N.69 Kemena	Stephen Rundi Utom	PBB	male			7,192	75.58	1/2
N.70 Samalaju	Majang Renggi	PRS	male			5,456	61.34	1/3
N.71 Bekenu	Rosey Yunus	BN Direct	female			6,009	71.68	1/4
N.72 Lambir	Ripin Lamat	PBB	male			7,503	68.66	1/3
N.73 Piasau	Sebastian Ting Chiew Yew	SUPP	male			7,799	57.83	1/2
N.74 Pujut	Hii King Chiong	BN Direct	male			7,140	42.18	2/4
N.75 Senadin	Lee Kim Sin @ Lee Kim Shin	SUPP	male			10,683	58.84	1/3
N.76 Marudi	Penguang Manggil	SPDP	male			5,493	56.89	1/3
N.77 Telang Usan	Dennis Ngau	PBB	male			3,231	51.33	1/2
N.78 Mulu	Gerawat Gala	BN Direct	male			3,198	61.08	1/4
N.79 Bukit Kota	Abdul Rahman Ismail	PBB	male			-	-	1/1
N.80 Batu Danau	Palu @ Paulus Palu Gumbang	BN Direct	male			4,366	75.37	1/2
N.81 Ba'kelalan	Willie Liau	SPDP	male			2,320	44.80	2/2
N.82 Bukit Sari	Tengah Ali Hassin	PBB	male			-	-	1/1

== People's Justice Party candidates (40 of 82 seats) ==
This is a list of the candidates who ran for the People's Justice Party (using the mata election symbol) in the 11th Sarawak state election. The party nominated candidates in 40 of the 82 state constituencies, winning 3.

State Constituency	Candidate name	Gender	Residence	Occupation / Notes	Votes	%	Rank
N.01 Opar	Francis Teron Kadap Noyet	male			1,549	21.16	3/4
N.02 Tasik Biru							
N.03 Tanjong Datu	Jazolkipli Numan	male			468	6.85	2/2
N.04 Pantai Damai							
N.05 Demak Laut							
N.06 Tupong	Nurhanim Hanna Mokhsen	female			2,887	20.88	2/2
N.07 Samariang							
N.08 Satok	Mohamed Salleh Shawkatali	male			1,809	20.88	2/2
N.09 Padungan							
N.10 Pending							
N.11 Batu Lintang	See Chee How	male			10,758	61.61	1/3
N.12 Kota Sentosa							
N.13 Batu Kitang	Voon Shiak Ni	female			883	7.30	3/5
N.14 Batu Kawah							
N.15 Asajaya	Abang Junaidi Abang Gom	male			2,085	25.28	2/2
N.16 Muara Tuang							
N.17 Stakan							
N.18 Serembu	Athina Klaywa Sim	female			1,218	17.79	3/4
N.19 Mambong	Willie Mongin	male			2,645	22.74	3/3
N.20 Tarat	Musa Ngog	male			3,029	26.39	2/2
N.21 Tebedu	Alex Saben Nipong @ Nyipong	male			1,164	13.66	2/2
N.22 Kedup							
N.23 Bukit Semuja							
N.24 Sadong Jaya							
N.25 Simunjan	Jamilah Baharuddin	female			1,389	24.09	2/3
N.26 Gedong							
N.27 Sebuyau							
N.28 Lingga	Abang Zulkifli Abang Engkeh	male			1,226	19.66	2/3
N.29 Beting Maro							
N.30 Balai Ringin	Nicholas Mujah Ason	male			700	9.08	3/4
N.31 Bukit Begunan	Jubri Atak	male			855	13.35	2/2
N.32 Simanggang	Norina Umoi Utot	female			580	7.18	4/4
N.33 Engkilili	Nicholas Bawin Anggat	male			532	6.83	3/4
N.34 Batang Ai	Kolien Liong	male			1,698	25.80	2/2
N.35 Saribas	Yakup Daud	male			1,531	20.43	2/2
N.36 Layar	Vernon Albert Kedit	male			2,503	38.90	2/2
N.37 Bukit Saban	Noel Changgai Bucking	male			925	14.34	2/2
N.38 Kalaka	Jemat Panjang	male			1,153	22.43	2/2
N.39 Krian	Ali Biju	male			5,388	58.98	1/2
N.40 Kabong							
N.41 Kuala Rajang							
N.42 Semop							
N.43 Daro							
N.44 Jemoreng							
N.45 Repok							
N.46 Meradong							
N.47 Pakan							
N.48 Meluan	Semana Sawang	male			2,088	22.33	3/4
N.49 Ngemah	Thomas Laja Besi	male			396	6.32	3/4
N.50 Machan	Chen Nguk Fa	male			1,381	18.34	3/3
N.51 Bukit Assek							
N.52 Dudong							
N.53 Bawang Assan							
N.54 Pelawan							
N.55 Nangka	Abdul Raafidin Majidi	male			2,000	16.14	2/3
N.56 Dalat	Sim Eng Hua	male			777	9.86	2/2
N.57 Tellian	Asini @ Hasni Yahya	male			666	11.58	2/2
N.58 Balingian							
N.59 Tamin	Simon Joseph	male			954	8.42	3/3
N.60 Kakus	Joshua Jabing @ Joshua Jabeng	male			1,843	19.65	2/3
N.61 Pelagus							
N.62 Katibas							
N.63 Bukit Goram							
N.64 Baleh							
N.65 Belaga	Alexander Lehan	male			463	10.04	2/2
N.66 Murum	Abun Sui Anyit	male			1,065	17.61	2/4
N.67 Jepak	Abdul Jalil Bujang	male			2,141	23.23	2/5
N.68 Tanjong Batu							
N.69 Kemena							
N.70 Samalaju							
N.71 Bekenu	Bill Kayong	male			1,220	14.55	2/4
N.72 Lambir	Mohdak Ismail	male			2,596	23.76	2/3
N.73 Piasau							
N.74 Pujut							
N.75 Senadin							
N.76 Marudi	Elia Bit	female			4,106	42.53	2/3
N.77 Telang Usan	Roland Engan	male			3,064	48.67	2/2
N.78 Mulu	Pauls Baya	male			1,490	28.46	2/4
N.79 Bukit Kota							
N.80 Batu Danau							
N.81 Ba'kelalan	Baru Bian	male		PKR state chairman	2,858	55.20	1/2
N.82 Bukit Sari							

== Independent candidates (36 candidates contesting in 30 of 82 seats) ==
This is a list of the candidates who ran as independent candidate (using the EC-approved election symbol) in the 11th Sarawak state election. A total of 36 independent candidates contested in 30 seats, end up without any elected representative.

State constituency	Candidate name	Election symbol	Gender	Residence	Occupation / Notes	Votes	%	Rank
N.01 Opar	Niponi Undek	Pokok	male			1,583	21.62	2/4
N.02 Tasik Biru								
N.03 Tanjong Datu								
N.04 Pantai Damai								
N.05 Demak Laut								
N.06 Tupong								
N.07 Samariang								
N.08 Satok								
N.09 Padungan								
N.10 Pending								
N.11 Batu Lintang								
N.12 Kota Sentosa								
N.13 Batu Kitang	Sulaiman Kadir	Kunci	male			61	0.50	4/5
N.13 Batu Kitang	Othman Bojeng	Burung	male			54	0.45	5/5
N.14 Batu Kawah	Liu Thian Leong	Kunci	male			1,109	9.36	3/3
N.15 Asajaya								
N.16 Muara Tuang								
N.17 Stakan								
N.18 Serembu	Nyomek Nyeap	Buku	male			2,055	30.02	2/4
N.19 Mambong								
N.20 Tarat								
N.21 Tebedu								
N.22 Kedup								
N.23 Bukit Semuja	Frederick Bayoi Manggie	Bunga	male			1,196	13.09	3/5
N.24 Sadong Jaya	Awang Rabiee Awang Hosen	Bunga	male			234	4.90	3/4
N.25 Simunjan	Hipni Kanaini	Kunci	male			275	4.77	3/3
N.26 Gedong	Uja Bansi	Kunci	male			396	7.68	3/3
N.27 Sebuyau								
N.28 Lingga	Wan Abdillah Edruce Wan Abdul Rahman	Pokok	male			842	13.50	3/3
N.29 Beting Maro								
N.30 Balai Ringin	Entusa Imam	Kerusi	male			2,439	31.65	2/4
N.31 Bukit Begunan								
N.32 Simanggang	Ngu Piew Seng	Kunci	male			2,706	33.51	2/4
N.33 Engkilili	Adan Sandom	Burung	male			91	1.17	4/4
N.33 Engkilili	Ridi Bauk	Bunga	male			1,656	21.25	2/4
N.34 Batang Ai								
N.35 Saribas								
N.36 Layar								
N.37 Bukit Saban								
N.38 Kalaka								
N.39 Krian								
N.40 Kabong								
N.41 Kuala Rajang	Asbor Abdullah	Perahu	male			153	2.17	3/3
N.42 Semop								
N.43 Daro								
N.44 Jemoreng	Abdullah Saminan	Pokok	male			1,295	19.72	2/3
N.45 Repok	Wong Chin King	Bunga	male			381	2.66	3/3
N.46 Meradong								
N.47 Pakan	Jawie Jingot @ Jenggot	Pokok	male			3,573	45.48	2/3
N.48 Meluan	Remiguis Noel @ Jerry Clement	Pokok	male			934	10.39	4/4
N.48 Meluan	Elly Lawai Ngalai	Kunci	male			2,686	29.87	2/4
N.49 Ngemah	Joseph Jawa Kendawang	Cangkul	male			2,734	43.67	2/4
N.50 Machan	Semawi Paong	Bunga	male			1,598	21.22	2/3
N.51 Bukit Assek								
N.52 Dudong	Benny Lee Chung Fatt	Kunci	male			3,288	15.72	3/5
N.52 Dudong	Casper Kayong Umping	Kerusi	male			228	1.09	4/5
N.53 Bawang Assan	Watson Bangau Johnathan Renang	Burung	male			569	3.89	3/5
N.53 Bawang Assan	Yeu Bang Keng	Kunci	male			63	0.43	5/5
N.54 Pelawan								
N.55 Nangka								
N.56 Dalat								
N.57 Tellian								
N.58 Balingian								
N.59 Tamin	Ali Puji	Kapal Terbang	male		medical doctor	4,145	36.59	2/3
N.60 Kakus								
N.61 Pelagus	Yong Sibat	Bunga	male			321	6.99	3/3
N.62 Katibas								
N.63 Bukit Goram								
N.64 Baleh								
N.65 Belaga								
N.66 Murum	Stanley Ajang Batok	Kunci	male			1,029	17.02	3/4
N.67 Jepak	Wong Hau Ming	Kapal Terbang	male			190	2.06	4/5
N.68 Tanjong Batu								
N.69 Kemena								
N.70 Samalaju								
N.71 Bekenu	Austin Sigi Melu	Cincin	male			589	7.03	3/4
N.71 Bekenu	Joe @ Peter Jelin	Bunga	male			565	6.74	4/4
N.72 Lambir								
N.73 Piasau								
N.74 Pujut	Fong Pau Teck	Kunci	male			375	2.22	4/4
N.75 Senadin								
N.76 Marudi	Louis Jalong	Ikan	male			56	0.58	3/3
N.77 Telang Usan								
N.78 Mulu	Roland Dom Mattu	Pokok	male			239	4.56	4/4
N.79 Bukit Kota								
N.80 Batu Danau	Ali Adap	Bunga	male			1,427	24.63	2/2
N.81 Ba'kelalan								
N.82 Bukit Sari								

== Democratic Action Party candidates (31 of 82 seats) ==
This is a list of the candidates who ran for the Democratic Action Party (using the "rocket" election symbol) in the 11th Sarawak state election. The party nominated candidates in 31 of the 82 state constituencies, winning 7.

State Constituency	Candidate name	Gender	Residence	Occupation / Notes	Votes	%	Rank
N.01 Opar							
N.02 Tasik Biru	Mordi Bimol	male			5,634	44.87	2/2
N.03 Tanjong Datu							
N.04 Pantai Damai							
N.05 Demak Laut							
N.06 Tupong							
N.07 Samariang							
N.08 Satok							
N.09 Padungan	Wong King Wei	male			9,332	64.31	1/3
N.10 Pending	Violet Yong Wui Wui	female			12,454	62.60	1/2
N.11 Batu Lintang							
N.12 Kota Sentosa	Chong Chieng Jen	male		DAP state chairman	10,047	58.16	1/2
N.13 Batu Kitang	Abdul Aziz Isa Marindo	male			4,626	38.26	2/5
N.14 Batu Kawah	Chiew Wang See	female			4,329	36.53	2/3
N.15 Asajaya							
N.16 Muara Tuang							
N.17 Stakan	Leslie Ting Xiang Zhi	male		sales executive	1,778	16.78	2/2
N.18 Serembu							
N.19 Mambong	Sanjan Daik	male			2,828	24.31	2/3
N.20 Tarat							
N.21 Tebedu							
N.22 Kedup	Andrew Nyabe	male			1,941	24.64	2/3
N.23 Bukit Semuja	Edward Andrew Luwak @ Edward Luwak	male			2,307	25.24	2/5
N.24 Sadong Jaya							
N.25 Simunjan							
N.26 Gedong							
N.27 Sebuyau							
N.28 Lingga							
N.29 Beting Maro							
N.30 Balai Ringin							
N.31 Bukit Begunan							
N.32 Simanggang	Leon Jimat Donald	male			695	8.61	3/4
N.33 Engkilili							
N.34 Batang Ai							
N.35 Saribas							
N.36 Layar							
N.37 Bukit Saban							
N.38 Kalaka							
N.39 Krian							
N.40 Kabong							
N.41 Kuala Rajang							
N.42 Semop							
N.43 Daro							
N.44 Jemoreng							
N.45 Repok	Yong Siew Wei	female			6,503	45.38	2/3
N.46 Meradong	Ting Tze Fui	female			5,349	43.79	2/2
N.47 Pakan	Rinda Juliza Alexander	female			285	3.63	3/3
N.48 Meluan							
N.49 Ngemah	Richard Lias	male			243	3.88	4/4
N.50 Machan							
N.51 Bukit Assek	Irene Mary Chang Oi Ling	female			11,392	61.05	1/3
N.52 Dudong	Yap Hoi Liong	male			7,554	36.11	2/5
N.53 Bawang Assan	Chiew Sung Ngie	male			4,884	33.38	2/5
N.54 Pelawan	Wong Kee Woan	male			13,056	58.30	1/3
N.55 Nangka							
N.56 Dalat							
N.57 Tellian							
N.58 Balingian							
N.59 Tamin							
N.60 Kakus							
N.61 Pelagus	Bendindang Manjah	male			494	10.76	2/3
N.62 Katibas	Paren Nyawi	male			1,628	25.80	2/2
N.63 Bukit Goram	Larry Asap	male			2,010	30.43	2/2
N.64 Baleh	Agop Linsong	male			479	8.33	2/2
N.65 Belaga							
N.66 Murum	Mathew Silek	male			687	11.36	4/4
N.67 Jepak							
N.68 Tanjong Batu	Chiew Chiu Sing	male			7,984	59.10	1/3
N.69 Kemena	Leighton Manjah	male			2,324	24.42	2/2
N.70 Samalaju	Baba Emperan	male			2,992	33.64	2/3
N.71 Bekenu							
N.72 Lambir							
N.73 Piasau	Alan Ling Sie Kiong	male			5,687	42.17	2/2
N.74 Pujut	Ting Tiong Choon	male			8,899	52.57	1/4
N.75 Senadin	Baru Langub	male			7,145	39.35	2/3
N.76 Marudi							
N.77 Telang Usan							
N.78 Mulu	Paul Anyie Raja	male			309	5.90	3/4
N.79 Bukit Kota							
N.80 Batu Danau							
N.81 Ba'kelalan							
N.82 Bukit Sari							

== National Trust Party candidates (13 of 82 seats) ==
This is a list of the candidates who ran for the National Trust Party (using the A election symbol) in the 11th Sarawak state election. The party nominated candidates in 13 of the 82 state constituencies, end up without any elected representative.

State constituency	Candidate name	Gender	Residence	Occupation / Notes	Votes	%	Rank
N.01 Opar							
N.02 Tasik Biru							
N.03 Tanjong Datu							
N.04 Pantai Damai							
N.05 Demak Laut	Mohammad Fidzuan Zaidi	male		AMANAH state chairman	1,157	11.93	2/2
N.06 Tupong							
N.07 Samariang	Nani Sahari	female			389	3.18	3/3
N.08 Satok							
N.09 Padungan							
N.10 Pending							
N.11 Batu Lintang							
N.12 Kota Sentosa							
N.13 Batu Kitang							
N.14 Batu Kawah							
N.15 Asajaya							
N.16 Muara Tuang	Abang Abdul Halil Abang Naili	male			765	6.19	3/3
N.17 Stakan							
N.18 Serembu							
N.19 Mambong							
N.20 Tarat							
N.21 Tebedu							
N.22 Kedup							
N.23 Bukit Semuja							
N.24 Sadong Jaya	Othman Mustapha @ Mos	male			157	3.29	4/4
N.25 Simunjan							
N.26 Gedong	Rapelson Richard Hamit	male			699	13.55	2/3
N.27 Sebuyau	Andrew Jain	male			164	2.53	3/3
N.28 Lingga							
N.29 Beting Maro	Andri Zulkarnaen Hamden	male			103	1.30	3/3
N.30 Balai Ringin							
N.31 Bukit Begunan							
N.32 Simanggang							
N.33 Engkilili							
N.34 Batang Ai							
N.35 Saribas							
N.36 Layar							
N.37 Bukit Saban							
N.38 Kalaka							
N.39 Krian							
N.40 Kabong	Jini Sahini	male			1,484	22.65	2/2
N.41 Kuala Rajang	Sufian Julaihi	male			649	9.22	2/3
N.42 Semop	Mohamad Fadillah Sabali	male			878	14.23	2/2
N.43 Daro	Ibrahim Bayau	male			569	10.22	2/2
N.44 Jemoreng	Kiprawi Suhaili	male			187	2.85	3/3
N.45 Repok							
N.46 Meradong							
N.47 Pakan							
N.48 Meluan							
N.49 Ngemah							
N.50 Machan							
N.51 Bukit Assek							
N.52 Dudong							
N.53 Bawang Assan							
N.54 Pelawan							
N.55 Nangka							
N.56 Dalat							
N.57 Tellian							
N.58 Balingian	Nurzaiti Hamdan	female			1,244	22.82	2/2
N.59 Tamin							
N.60 Kakus							
N.61 Pelagus							
N.62 Katibas							
N.63 Bukit Goram							
N.64 Baleh							
N.65 Belaga							
N.66 Murum							
N.67 Jepak							
N.68 Tanjong Batu							
N.69 Kemena							
N.70 Samalaju							
N.71 Bekenu							
N.72 Lambir							
N.73 Piasau							
N.74 Pujut							
N.75 Senadin							
N.76 Marudi							
N.77 Telang Usan							
N.78 Mulu							
N.79 Bukit Kota							
N.80 Batu Danau							
N.81 Ba'kelalan							
N.82 Bukit Sari							

== Pan-Malaysian Islamic Party candidates (11 of 82 seats) ==
This is a list of the candidates who ran for the Pan-Malaysian Islamic Party (using the bulan election symbol) in the 11th Sarawak state election. The party nominated candidates in 11 of the 82 state constituencies, end up without any elected representative.

State Constituency	Candidate name	Gender	Residence	Occupation / Notes	Votes	%	Rank
N.01 Opar							
N.02 Tasik Biru							
N.03 Tanjong Datu							
N.04 Pantai Damai	Zainal Abidin Yet	male			1,658	13.18	2/2
N.05 Demak Laut							
N.06 Tupong							
N.07 Samariang	Yusof Assidiqqi Ahmad Sharkawi	male			2,035	16.65	2/3
N.08 Satok							
N.09 Padungan							
N.10 Pending							
N.11 Batu Lintang							
N.12 Kota Sentosa							
N.13 Batu Kitang							
N.14 Batu Kawah							
N.15 Asajaya							
N.16 Muara Tuang	Zulkipli Ramzi	male			1,508	12.20	2/3
N.17 Stakan							
N.18 Serembu							
N.19 Mambong							
N.20 Tarat							
N.21 Tebedu							
N.22 Kedup							
N.23 Bukit Semuja							
N.24 Sadong Jaya	Asan Singkro	male			458	9.59	2/4
N.25 Simunjan							
N.26 Gedong							
N.27 Sebuyau	Wan Abdillah Wan Ahmad	male			1,789	27.59	2/3
N.28 Lingga							
N.29 Beting Maro	Hamidah Mokhtar	female			3,051	38.56	2/3
N.30 Balai Ringin							
N.31 Bukit Begunan							
N.32 Simanggang							
N.33 Engkilili							
N.34 Batang Ai							
N.35 Saribas							
N.36 Layar							
N.37 Bukit Saban							
N.38 Kalaka							
N.39 Krian							
N.40 Kabong							
N.41 Kuala Rajang							
N.42 Semop							
N.43 Daro							
N.44 Jemoreng							
N.45 Repok							
N.46 Meradong							
N.47 Pakan							
N.48 Meluan							
N.49 Ngemah							
N.50 Machan							
N.51 Bukit Assek							
N.52 Dudong							
N.53 Bawang Assan							
N.54 Pelawan							
N.55 Nangka							
N.56 Dalat							
N.57 Tellian							
N.58 Balingian							
N.59 Tamin							
N.60 Kakus	Clement Bayang	male			482	5.14	3/3
N.61 Pelagus							
N.62 Katibas							
N.63 Bukit Goram							
N.64 Baleh							
N.65 Belaga							
N.66 Murum							
N.67 Jepak	Kiprawi Aman	male			406	4.41	3/5
N.68 Tanjong Batu							
N.69 Kemena							
N.70 Samalaju	Zharudin Narudin	male			447	5.03	3/3
N.71 Bekenu							
N.72 Lambir	Mohammad Arifiriazul Paijo	male			829	7.59	3/3
N.73 Piasau							
N.74 Pujut	Jofri Jaraiee	male		PAS state commissioner	513	3.03	3/4
N.75 Senadin							
N.76 Marudi							
N.77 Telang Usan							
N.78 Mulu							
N.79 Bukit Kota							
N.80 Batu Danau							
N.81 Ba'kelalan							
N.82 Bukit Sari							

== State Reform Party candidates (11 of 82 seats) ==
This is a list of the candidates who ran for the State Reform Party (using the "Bintang 9 Bucu" election symbol) in the 11th Sarawak state election. The party nominated candidates in 11 of the 82 state constituencies, end up without any elected representative.

State constituency	Candidate name	Gender	Residence	Occupation / Notes	Votes	%	Rank
N.01 Opar							
N.02 Tasik Biru							
N.03 Tanjong Datu							
N.04 Pantai Damai							
N.05 Demak Laut							
N.06 Tupong							
N.07 Samariang							
N.08 Satok							
N.09 Padungan	Teo Kuang Kim	male			116	0.80	3/3
N.10 Pending							
N.11 Batu Lintang	Soo Lina	female		STAR president	331	1.90	3/3
N.12 Kota Sentosa							
N.13 Batu Kitang							
N.14 Batu Kawah							
N.15 Asajaya							
N.16 Muara Tuang							
N.17 Stakan							
N.18 Serembu	Buln Patrick Ribos	male			120	1.75	4/4
N.19 Mambong							
N.20 Tarat							
N.21 Tebedu							
N.22 Kedup							
N.23 Bukit Semuja	Johnny Bob Aput	male			53	0.58	5/5
N.24 Sadong Jaya							
N.25 Simunjan							
N.26 Gedong							
N.27 Sebuyau							
N.28 Lingga							
N.29 Beting Maro							
N.30 Balai Ringin							
N.31 Bukit Begunan							
N.32 Simanggang							
N.33 Engkilili							
N.34 Batang Ai							
N.35 Saribas							
N.36 Layar							
N.37 Bukit Saban							
N.38 Kalaka							
N.39 Krian							
N.40 Kabong							
N.41 Kuala Rajang							
N.42 Semop							
N.43 Daro							
N.44 Jemoreng							
N.45 Repok							
N.46 Meradong							
N.47 Pakan							
N.48 Meluan							
N.49 Ngemah							
N.50 Machan							
N.51 Bukit Assek	Moh Hiong King	male			374	2.00	3/3
N.52 Dudong	Ting Yiik Hong	female			152	0.73	5/5
N.53 Bawang Assan	Wong Sing Wei	male			100	0.68	4/5
N.54 Pelawan	Priscilla Lau	female			597	2.67	3/3
N.55 Nangka	Tiong Ing Tung	male			773	6.24	3/3
N.56 Dalat							
N.57 Tellian							
N.58 Balingian							
N.59 Tamin							
N.60 Kakus							
N.61 Pelagus							
N.62 Katibas							
N.63 Bukit Goram							
N.64 Baleh							
N.65 Belaga							
N.66 Murum							
N.67 Jepak	Mohammed Anuar Abd Hamid	male			136	1.48	5/5
N.68 Tanjong Batu	Chieng Lea Phing	male			89	0.66	3/3
N.69 Kemena							
N.70 Samalaju							
N.71 Bekenu							
N.72 Lambir							
N.73 Piasau							
N.74 Pujut							
N.75 Senadin							
N.76 Marudi							
N.77 Telang Usan							
N.78 Mulu							
N.79 Bukit Kota							
N.80 Batu Danau							
N.81 Ba'kelalan							
N.82 Bukit Sari							

== Parti Bansa Dayak Sarawak Baru candidates (5 of 82 seats) ==
This is a list of the candidates who ran for the Parti Bansa Dayak Sarawak Baru (using the Perisai Parang Lembing election symbol) in the 11th Sarawak state election. The party nominated candidates in 5 of the 82 state constituencies, end up without any elected representative.

State constituency	Candidate name	Gender	Residence	Occupation / Notes	Votes	%	Rank
N.01 Opar	Patrick Uren	male		PBDS Baru deputy president	524	7.16	4/4
N.02 Tasik Biru							
N.03 Tanjong Datu							
N.04 Pantai Damai							
N.05 Demak Laut							
N.06 Tupong							
N.07 Samariang							
N.08 Satok							
N.09 Padungan							
N.10 Pending							
N.11 Batu Lintang							
N.12 Kota Sentosa							
N.13 Batu Kitang							
N.14 Batu Kawah							
N.15 Asajaya							
N.16 Muara Tuang							
N.17 Stakan							
N.18 Serembu							
N.19 Mambong							
N.20 Tarat							
N.21 Tebedu							
N.22 Kedup	Mark Murau Sumon	male			168	2.13	3/3
N.23 Bukit Semuja	Cobbold Lusoi	male			133	1.46	4/5
N.24 Sadong Jaya							
N.25 Simunjan							
N.26 Gedong							
N.27 Sebuyau							
N.28 Lingga							
N.29 Beting Maro							
N.30 Balai Ringin	Pok Ungkut	male			90	1.17	4/4
N.31 Bukit Begunan							
N.32 Simanggang							
N.33 Engkilili							
N.34 Batang Ai							
N.35 Saribas							
N.36 Layar							
N.37 Bukit Saban							
N.38 Kalaka							
N.39 Krian							
N.40 Kabong							
N.41 Kuala Rajang							
N.42 Semop							
N.43 Daro							
N.44 Jemoreng							
N.45 Repok							
N.46 Meradong							
N.47 Pakan							
N.48 Meluan							
N.49 Ngemah							
N.50 Machan							
N.51 Bukit Assek							
N.52 Dudong							
N.53 Bawang Assan							
N.54 Pelawan							
N.55 Nangka							
N.56 Dalat							
N.57 Tellian							
N.58 Balingian							
N.59 Tamin							
N.60 Kakus							
N.61 Pelagus							
N.62 Katibas							
N.63 Bukit Goram							
N.64 Baleh							
N.65 Belaga							
N.66 Murum							
N.67 Jepak							
N.68 Tanjong Batu							
N.69 Kemena							
N.70 Samalaju							
N.71 Bekenu							
N.72 Lambir							
N.73 Piasau							
N.74 Pujut							
N.75 Senadin	Philemon John Edan	male			329	1.81	3/3
N.76 Marudi							
N.77 Telang Usan							
N.78 Mulu							
N.79 Bukit Kota							
N.80 Batu Danau							
N.81 Ba'kelalan							
N.82 Bukit Sari							
