= Cabinet of Sarawak =

Executive branch of the Sarawak government

- Kabinet Sarawak
- Coat of arms of Sarawak

Overview
- Established: 16 September 1963
- State: Sarawak
- Leader: Premier
- Appointed by: Governor on the advice of the Premier
- Responsible to: Legislative Assembly

The cabinet of Sarawak (Malay: Kabinet Sarawak) serves as the primary decision-making body within the executive branch of the Government of Sarawak. Its composition mirrors that of the federal level, albeit on a smaller scale. At its core is the Premier, appointed by the Yang di-Pertua Negeri (Governor) based on their ability to secure majority support in the Sarawak State Legislative Assembly. The Cabinet comprises ministers drawn from the legislative body, appointed by the Premier's recommendation.

Much like at the federal level, each Cabinet minister heads a specific ministry. However, due to variations in federal and state jurisdictions, certain portfolios may differ between the two levels of government.

== History ==
The Supreme Council served as the executive branch of the government prior to Sarawak's independence, led by the Rajah of Sarawak. Then-Rajah Charles Brooke primarily appointed relatives, friends and family members to the cabinet, each in charge of specific races or divisions in Sarawak.

Upon independence on Sarawak Day, Supreme Council members appointed by outgoing governor Alexander Waddell became the first Cabinet of Sarawak.

== Cabinet appointments ==
The state constitution mandates a structured process for the appointment of members to the Cabinet. The Governor appoints the Premier, who must be a member of the State Legislative Assembly and is likely to gain the trust of the majority of its members. Subsequently, the Premier advises the Governor on the appointment of other Cabinet members, with the Governor appointing no more than ten and no fewer than four members from among the sitting members of the State Legislative Assembly. The constitution also includes provisions for appointments during the dissolution of the State Legislative Assembly and for Cabinet members who cease to be members of the State Legislative Assembly.

Before assuming the functions of their office, a member of the Cabinet is required to take and subscribe to an oath in the presence of the Governor.

=== Tenure ===
The state constitution also defines the tenure of office for members of the Cabinet through several provisions. Firstly, it stipulates that if the Premier, who leads the Cabinet, loses the confidence of a majority of the members of the State Legislative Assembly, they are required to tender the resignation of the entire Cabinet. However, the Premier may alternatively request the Governor to dissolve the State Legislative Assembly, potentially leading to new elections.

Secondly, the constitution allows members of the Cabinet to resign from their positions at any time by submitting a written resignation to the Governor. If a member of the Cabinet, excluding the Premier, has their appointment revoked by the Governor upon the advice of the Premier, they are also required to vacate their office.

Thirdly, except for the Premier, who is contingent upon the confidence of the State Legislative Assembly, members of the Cabinet serve at the pleasure of the Governor. This means that their tenure in office is at the discretion of the Governor, and they may continue to hold office unless they voluntarily resign or have their appointment revoked.

=== Deputy ministers ===
The constitution also provides for the appointment of Deputy Ministers by the Governor upon the advice of the Premier from among the members of the State Legislative Assembly. Deputy Ministers do not hold Cabinet membership. There are specific provisions for appointments during the dissolution of the State Legislative Assembly and for the continuation of office in case of ceasing membership in the Assembly. The primary role of Deputy Ministers is to assist the Premier and Ministers in their duties, with powers equivalent to Ministers. Certain provisions applicable to Cabinet members also extend to Deputy Ministers for consistency in governance.

This post was known as Assistant Minister before an amendment to the constitution regarding the matter was successfully passed on 15 February 2022, renaming the post to "Deputy Minister". The constitutional amendment was gazetted and came into effect on 1 March 2022.

== Responsibilities and restrictions of cabinet members ==
The state constitution delineates the assignment of responsibilities to members of the Cabinet and imposes restrictions on their engagement in trade, business, or profession. Firstly, the Governor, upon the advice of the Premier, holds the authority to allocate specific governmental tasks to Cabinet members, encompassing the management of state affairs and the administration of government departments. Under this provision, any Cabinet member entrusted with such responsibilities is designated with the title of "Minister".

In addition to the assignment of duties, the Constitution imposes limitations on the commercial activities of Cabinet members. Specifically, members of the Cabinet are prohibited from participating in any trade, business, or profession that is directly connected with the subject or department of government for which they are responsible. Furthermore, they are barred from involvement in Cabinet decisions pertaining to their trade, business, or profession, or decisions that could potentially impact their financial interests in these pursuits, for as long as they continue to engage in them.

=== Governor to act on advice ===
Article 10 of the Constitution outlines the governance structure regarding the role and powers of the Governor in relation to the Cabinet and the exercise of their functions. It delineates specific scenarios where the Governor is mandated to act on advice from the Premier or a member of the Cabinet, and those where they retain discretionary powers.

In accordance with the constitutional framework, the Governor is primarily required to act on the advice of the Premier or a member of the Cabinet in the execution of their functions.

However, the provision also acknowledges instances where the Governor exercises discretion. Notably, the Governor retains the authority to independently appoint a Premier and to withhold consent for the dissolution of the State Legislative Assembly.

Furthermore, the State Legislative Assembly is granted the authority to enact laws that regulate the Governor's exercise of functions, including provisions for consultation or recommendations from entities other than the Cabinet.

== Present composition ==
=== Ministers ===
GPS (11)
PBB (8)	SUPP (2)	PRS (1)	PDP (0)

Portfolio	Officeholder	Party	Constituency	Term start	Term end
Premier	Datuk Patinggi Tan Sri Dr. Abang Haji Abdul Rahman Zohari bin Tun Datuk Abang Haji Openg	PBB	Gedong	18 December 2021	Incumbent
Deputy Premiers	Datuk Amar Douglas Uggah Embas	PBB	Bukit Saban	4 January 2022	Incumbent
Deputy Premiers	Datuk Amar Haji Awang Tengah bin Ali Hasan	PBB	Bukit Sari	4 January 2022	Incumbent
Deputy Premiers	Prof. Datuk Amar Dr. Sim Kui Hian	SUPP	Batu Kawah	4 January 2022	Incumbent
Minister in the Premier's Department	Dato Sri John Sikie Tayai	PRS	Kakus	4 January 2022	Incumbent
Minister for Finance and New Economy	Datuk Patinggi Tan Sri Dr. Abang Haji Abdul Rahman Zohari bin Tun Datuk Abang Haji Openg	PBB	Gedong	4 January 2022	Incumbent
Minister for Finance and New Economy	Datuk Amar Douglas Uggah Embas (as Second Minister)	PBB	Bukit Saban	4 January 2022	Incumbent
Minister for Natural Resources and Urban Development	Datuk Patinggi Tan Sri Dr. Abang Haji Abdul Rahman Zohari bin Tun Datuk Abang Haji Openg	PBB	Gedong	4 January 2022	Incumbent
Minister for Natural Resources and Urban Development	Datuk Amar Haji Awang Tengah bin Ali Hasan (as Second Minister)	PBB	Bukit Sari	4 January 2022	Incumbent
Minister for Energy and Environmental Sustainability	Datuk Patinggi Tan Sri Dr. Abang Haji Abdul Rahman Zohari bin Tun Datuk Abang Haji Openg	PBB	Gedong	4 January 2022	Incumbent
Minister for Infrastructure and Port Development	Datuk Amar Douglas Uggah Embas	PBB	Bukit Saban	4 January 2022	Incumbent
Minister for International Trade, Industry and Investment	Datuk Amar Haji Awang Tengah bin Ali Hasan	PBB	Bukit Sari	4 January 2022	Incumbent
Minister for Public Health, Housing and Local Government	Prof. Datuk Amar Dr. Sim Kui Hian	SUPP	Batu Kawah	4 January 2022	Incumbent
Minister for Women, Childhood and Community Wellbeing Development	Dato Sri Hajah Fatimah Abdullah	PBB	Dalat	4 January 2022	Incumbent
Minister for Food Industry, Commodity and Regional Development	Dato Sri Dr. Stephen Rundi Utom	PBB	Kemena	4 January 2022	Incumbent
Minister for Transport	Dato Sri Lee Kim Shin	SUPP	Senadin	4 January 2022	Incumbent
Minister for Utility and Telecommunication	Dato Sri Haji Julaihi bin Haji Narawi	PBB	Sebuyau	4 January 2022	Incumbent
Minister for Tourism, Creative Industry and Performing Arts	Dato Sri Abdul Karim Rahman Hamzah	PBB	Asajaya	4 January 2022	Incumbent
Minister for Youth, Sports and Entrepreneur Development	Dato Sri Abdul Karim Rahman Hamzah	PBB	Asajaya	4 January 2022	Incumbent
Minister for Education, Innovation and Talent Development	Dato Sri Roland Sagah Wee Inn	PBB	Tarat	4 January 2022	Incumbent

=== Deputy Ministers ===
GPS (27)
PBB (18)	SUPP (3)	PRS (4)	PDP (2)

Portfolio	Officeholder	Party		Constituency	Term start	Term end
Deputy Minister in the Premier's Department	Datuk Hajjah Sharifah Hasidah binti Sayeed Aman Ghazali (Law, MA63 and State-Federal Relations)		PBB	Samariang	4 January 2022	Incumbent
Deputy Minister in the Premier's Department	Datuk Gerawat Gala (Labour, Immigration and Project Monitoring)		PBB	Mulu	4 January 2022	Incumbent
Deputy Minister in the Premier's Department	Datuk Abdullah bin Haji Saidol (Corporate Affairs and UKAS)		PBB	Semop	4 January 2022	Incumbent
Deputy Minister in the Premier's Department	Dato Murshid Diraja Dr. Juanda Jaya (Integrity and Ombudsman)		PBB	Jemoreng	4 January 2022	Incumbent
Deputy Minister in the Premier's Department	Datuk Jefferson Jamit anak Unyat (Native Law and Customs)		PBB	Bukit Goram	4 January 2022	Incumbent
Deputy Minister in the Premier's Department	Datuk Dr. Haji Abdul Rahman bin Haji Junaidi (DBKU, Islamic Affairs & Project Coordinator for Regional Development Agency)		PBB	Pantai Damai	17 March 2025	Incumbent
Deputy Minister for Natural Resources and Urban Development	Datuk Haji Len Talif Salleh (Urban Planning Land Administration and Environment)		PBB	Kuala Rajang	4 January 2022	Incumbent
Deputy Minister for Energy and Environmental Sustainability	Datuk Dr. Haji Hazland Abang Hipni		PBB	Demak Laut	4 January 2022	Incumbent
Deputy Minister for Infrastructure and Port Development	Datuk Ir. Aidel bin Lariwoo (Infrastructure Development)		PBB	Sadong Jaya	4 January 2022	Incumbent
Deputy Minister for Infrastructure and Port Development	Datuk Majang anak Renggi (Port Development)		PRS	Samalaju	4 January 2022	Incumbent
Deputy Minister for International Trade and Investment	Datuk Dr. Malcom Mussen anak Lamoh		PRS	Batang Ai	4 January 2022	Incumbent
Deputy Minister for Public Health, Housing and Local Government	Datuk Dr. Penguang anak Manggil (Public Health and Housing)		PDP	Marudi	4 January 2022	Incumbent
Deputy Minister for Public Health, Housing and Local Government	Datuk Michael Tiang Ming Tee (Local Government)		SUPP	Pelawan	4 January 2022	Incumbent
Deputy Minister for Food Industry, Commodity and Regional Development	Datuk Dr. Haji Abdul Rahman bin Haji Ismail (Modernisation of Agriculture)	`	PBB	Bukit Kota	4 January 2022	Incumbent
Deputy Minister for Food Industry, Commodity and Regional Development	Datuk Maclaine @ Martin Ben (Regional Development)		PBB	Kedup	4 January 2022	Incumbent
Deputy Minister for Transport	Datuk Dr. Jerip anak Susil		PBB	Mambong	4 January 2022	Incumbent
Deputy Minister for Transport	Datuk Henry Harry anak Jinep		PDP	Tasik Biru	4 January 2022	Incumbent
Deputy Minister for Utility and Telecommunication	Datuk Dr. Haji Abdul Rahman bin Haji Junaidi (Utility)		PBB	Pantai Damai	4 January 2022	17 March 2025
Deputy Minister for Utility and Telecommunication	Datuk Ibrahim Baki (Utility)		PBB	Satok	17 March 2025	Incumbent
Deputy Minister for Utility and Telecommunication	Datuk Liwan Lagang (Telecommunication)		PRS	Belaga	4 January 2022	Incumbent
Deputy Minister for Tourism, Creative Industry and Performing Arts	Datuk Sebastian Ting Chiew Yew (Tourism)		SUPP	Piasau	4 January 2022	Incumbent
Deputy Minister for Tourism, Creative Industry and Performing Arts	Datuk Snowdan anak Lawan (Creative Industry and Performing Arts)		PRS	Balai Ringin	4 January 2022	Incumbent
Deputy Minister for Youth, Sport and Entrepreneur Development	Datuk Gerald Rentap Jabu (Youth and Sport Development)		PBB	Layar	4 January 2022	Incumbent
Deputy Minister for Youth, Sport and Entrepreneur Development	Datuk Dr. Ripin bin Lamat (Entrepreneur Development)		PBB	Lambir	4 January 2022	Incumbent
Deputy Minister for Women, Childhood and Community Wellbeing Development	Datuk Hajah Rosey Haji Yunus (Women and Early Childhood Development)		PBB	Bekenu	4 January 2022	Incumbent
Deputy Minister for Women, Childhood and Community Wellbeing Development	Datuk Ricky @ Mohd Razi bin Sitam (Community Wellbeing Development)		PBB	Saribas	4 January 2022	Incumbent
Deputy Minister for Education, Innovation and Talent Development	Datuk Dr. Haji Annuar bin Rapaee (Education and Innovation)		PBB	Nangka	4 January 2022	Incumbent
Deputy Minister for Education, Innovation and Talent Development	Datuk Francis Harden anak Hollis (Talent Development)		SUPP	Simanggang	4 January 2022	Incumbent

== List of cabinets ==
No.	Cabinet	Term began	Term ended	Cabinet composition	Legislative term (election)
					1st
					2nd
					3rd
					4th
					5th
					6th
	Stephen Kalong I	1963	1966	Alliance (SNAP–SCA–BARJASA–PESAKA)	7th
	Tawi Sli I	1966	1966	Alliance (PESAKA–BARJASA–SCA)	7th
	Stephen Kalong II	1966	1966	SNAP (minority)	7th
	Tawi Sli II	1966	1970	Alliance (PESAKA–BARJASA–SCA)	7th
	Abdul Rahman I	1970	1974	Alliance (BUMIPUTERA–SCA) (until 1973)	8th (1969–70)
	Abdul Rahman I	1970	1974	BN (PBB–SUPP) (from 1973)	8th (1969–70)
	Rahman II	1974	1979	BN (PBB–SUPP)	9th (1974)
	Rahman III	1979	1981	BN (PBB–SUPP)	10th (1979)
	Abdul Taib I	1981	1983	BN (PBB–SUPP)	10th (1979)
	Abdul Taib II	1983	1987	BN (PBB–SUPP)	11th (1983)
	Abdul Taib III	1987	1991	BN (PBB–SUPP–SNP)	12th (1987)
	Abdul Taib IV	1991	1996	BN (PBB–SUPP–SNP)	13th (1991)
	Abdul Taib V	1996	2001	BN (PBB–SUPP–PBDS–SNP)	14th (1996)
	Abdul Taib VI	2001	2006	BN (PBB–SUPP–PBDS–SNP)	15th (2001)
	Abdul Taib VII	2006	2011	BN (PBB–SUPP–PRS–SPDP)	16th (2006)
	Abdul Taib VIII	2011	2014	BN (PBB–PRS–SUPP–SPDP)	17th (2011)
	Adenan Satem I	2014	2016	BN (PBB–PRS–SUPP–SPDP)	17th (2011)
	Adenan Satem II	8 May 2016	11 January 2017	BN (PBB–PRS–SUPP–PDP) – UPP	18th (2016)
	Abang Johari I	11 January 2017	3 January 2022	BN (PBB–PRS–SUPP–PDP) – UPP (2017–2018)	18th (2016)
	Abang Johari I	11 January 2017	3 January 2022	GPS (PBB–PRS–SUPP–PDP) – PSB (2018–2019)	18th (2016)
	Abang Johari I	11 January 2017	3 January 2022	GPS (PBB–PRS–SUPP–PDP) (2019–2021)	18th (2016)
	Abang Johari II	4 January 2022	26 October 2026	GPS (PBB–PRS–SUPP–PDP)	19th (2021)
	Abang Johari III				

== See also ==
- Yang di-Pertua Negeri of Sarawak
- Premier of Sarawak
- Sarawak State Legislative Assembly
