= First Abang Johari cabinet =

- 18th cabinet of Sarawak
- 2017–2022
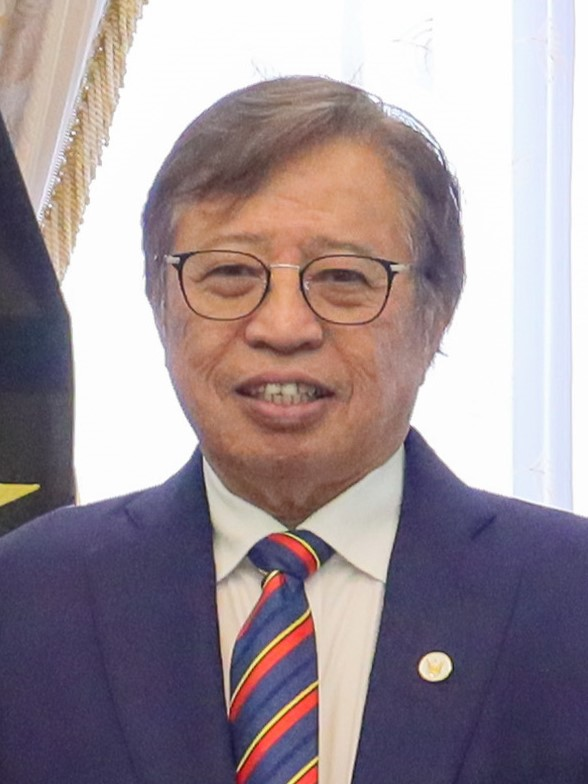
- Date formed: 19 January 2017
- Date dissolved: 3 January 2022

People and organisations
- Governor: Abdul Taib Mahmud
- Chief Minister: Abang Abdul Rahman Johari Abang Openg
- No. of ministers: 11 ministers
- Member parties: Gabungan Parti Sarawak: Parti Pesaka Bumiputera Bersatu; Sarawak United Peoples' Party; Parti Rakyat Sarawak; Progressive Democratic Party
- Status in legislature: Majority (coalition) with confidence & supply from BERSATU 68 / 82 (83%)
- Opposition parties: Parti Sarawak Bersatu; Pakatan Harapan; Democratic Action Party
- Opposition leaders: Chong Chieng Jen (2017–2020); Wong Soon Koh (2020–2022)

History
- Election: 2016 state election
- Legislature term: 18th Legislative Assembly
- Predecessor: Second Adenan cabinet
- Successor: Second Abang Johari cabinet

The First Abang Johari cabinet took office on 19 January 2017, six days after the election of Abang Abdul Rahman Zohari Abang Openg to the leadership of Parti Pesaka Bumiputera Bersatu (PBB) and his appointment as Chief Minister of Sarawak, Malaysia. It succeeded the second Adenan cabinet, which dissolved on 11 January 2017 following the death of the previous Chief Minister Adenan Satem.

The cabinet consists of ministers and assistant ministers from PBB, the Sarawak United Peoples' Party (SUPP), Parti Rakyat Sarawak (PRS) and Progressive Democratic Party (PDP) and it remained in office during the departure of the four governing parties from the Barisan Nasional coalition and the formation of the Gabungan Parti Sarawak coalition on 12 June 2018.

The cabinet was dissolved on 4 January 2022, just after the Second Abang Johari cabinet was sworn into office with effect.

== Composition ==
=== Ministers ===
GPS (11)
PBB (8)	SUPP (2)	PRS (1)

Portfolio	Officeholder	Party	Constituency	Term start	Term end
Chief Minister	Datuk Patinggi Tan Sri Dr. Abang Abdul Rahman Johari Abang Openg	PBB	Satok	14 January 2017	3 January 2022
Deputy Chief Minister	Datuk Amar Douglas Uggah Embas	PBB	Bukit Saban	19 January 2017	3 January 2022
Deputy Chief Minister	Tan Sri Datuk Amar Dr. James Jemut Masing	PRS	Baleh	19 January 2017	31 October 2021
Deputy Chief Minister	Datuk Amar Haji Awang Tengah Ali Hasan	PBB	Bukit Sari	19 January 2017	3 January 2022
Minister of Finance and Economic Planning	Datuk Patinggi Tan Sri Dr. Abang Abdul Rahman Johari Abang Openg	PBB	Satok	19 January 2017	3 January 2022
Minister of Finance and Economic Planning	Datuk Amar Douglas Uggah Embas (as Second Minister of Finance)	PBB	Bukit Saban	19 January 2017	3 January 2022
Minister of Urban Development and Resources	Datuk Patinggi Tan Sri Dr. Abang Abdul Rahman Johari Abang Openg	PBB	Satok	19 January 2017	3 January 2022
Minister of Urban Development and Resources	Datuk Amar Haji Awang Tengah Ali Hasan (as Second Minister of Urban Development and Resources)	PBB	Bukit Sari	19 January 2017	3 January 2022
Minister of Agriculture, Native Land and Regional Development	Datuk Amar Douglas Uggah Embas	PBB	Bukit Saban	19 January 2017	3 January 2022
Minister of Infrastructure and Ports Development	Tan Sri Datuk Amar Dr. James Jemut Masing	PRS	Baleh	19 January 2017	31 October 2021
Minister of International Trade and Industry, Industrial Terminal and Entrepreneur Development	Datuk Amar Haji Awang Tengah Ali Hasan	PBB	Bukit Sari	19 January 2017	3 January 2022
Minister in the Chief Minister's Department	Datuk Haji Talip Zulpilip (Integrity & Ombudsman)	PBB	Jepak	19 January 2017	3 January 2022
Minister of Education, Science and Technological Research	Datuk Amar Michael Manyin Jawong	PBB	Tebedu	19 January 2017	3 January 2022
Minister of Local Government and Housing	Dato Sri Prof Dr. Sim Kui Hian	SUPP	Batu Kawah	19 January 2017	3 January 2022
Minister of Transport	Datuk Lee Kim Shin	SUPP	Senadin	22 August 2019	3 January 2022
Minister of Tourism, Arts and Culture	Datuk Haji Abdul Karim Rahman Hamzah	PBB	Asajaya	19 January 2017	3 January 2022
Minister of Youth and Sports	Datuk Haji Abdul Karim Rahman Hamzah	PBB	Asajaya	19 January 2017	3 January 2022
Minister of Utilities	Dato Sri Dr. Stephen Rundi Utom	PBB	Kemena	19 January 2017	3 January 2022
Minister of Welfare, Community Wellbeing, Women, Family and Childhood Development	Dato Sri Hajah Fatimah Abdullah	PBB	Dalat	19 January 2017	3 January 2022

=== Assistant ministers ===
GPS (18)
PBB (11)	PRS (4)	SUPP (2)	PDP (1)

Portfolio	Officeholder	Party	Constituency	Term start	Term end
Assistant Minister in the Chief Minister's Department	Datuk Abdullah Saidol (Corporate Affairs & Sarawak Public Communications Unit)	PBB	Semop	19 July 2017	3 January 2022
Assistant Minister in the Chief Minister's Department	Datuk Dr. Haji Abdul Rahman Junaidi (Islamic Affairs & Kuching North CIty Commission)	PBB	Pantai Damai	19 July 2017	3 January 2022
Assistant Minister in the Chief Minister's Department	Datuk Hajah Sharifah Hasidah Sayeed Aman Ghazali (Law, State-Federal Relations and Project Monitoring)	PBB	Samariang	19 July 2017	3 January 2022
Assistant Minister in the Chief Minister's Department	Datuk John Sikie Tayai (Native Law and Customs)	PRS	Kakus	19 July 2017	3 January 2022
Assistant Minister of Agriculture, Native Land and Regional Development	Datuk Roland Sagah Wee Inn (Native Land Development)	PBB	Tarat	22 September 2021	3 January 2022
Assistant Minister of Agriculture, Native Land and Regional Development	Datuk Dr. Haji Abdul Rahman Ismail	PBB	Bukit Kota	19 July 2017	3 January 2022
Assistant Minister of Infrastructure and Ports Development	Datuk Haji Julaihi Narawi	PBB	Sebuyau	19 July 2017	3 January 2022
Assistant Minister of International Trade and Industry, Industrial Terminal and Entrepreneur Development	Datuk Haji Mohd Naroden Majais	PBB	Gedong	19 July 2017	3 January 2022
Assistant Minister of International Trade and Industry, Industrial Terminal and Entrepreneur Development	Datuk Malcolm Mussen Lamoh (Development and Industry)	PRS	Batang Ai	22 September 2021	3 January 2022
Assistant Minister of Education, Science and Technological Research	Datuk Dr. Haji Annuar Rapa’ee	PBB	Nangka	19 July 2017	3 January 2022
Assistant Minister of Local Government and Housing	Datu Dr. Penguang Manggil (Local Government)	PDP	Marudi	22 September 2021	3 January 2022
Assistant Minister of Local Government and Housing	Datuk Dr. Haji Annuar Rapa'ee (Housing and Public Health)	PBB	Nangka	22 September 2021	3 January 2022
Assistant Minister of Tourism, Arts and Culture	Datuk Sebastian Ting Chiew Yew	SUPP	Piasau	22 August 2019	3 January 2022
Assistant Minister of Transport	Datuk Dr. Jerip Susil	PBB	Mambong	19 July 2017	3 January 2022
Assistant Minister of Urban Development and Resources	Datu Haji Len Talif Salleh (Urban Planning, Land Administration and Environment)	PBB	Kuala Rajang	22 September 2021	3 January 2022
Assistant Minister of Utilities	Datuk Dr. Haji Abdul Rahman Junaidi (Water Supply)	PBB	Pantai Damai	19 July 2017	3 January 2022
Assistant Minister of Utilities	Datuk Liwan Lagang (Rural Electricity)	PRS	Belaga	19 July 2017	3 January 2022
Assistant Minister of Welfare, Community Wellbeing, Women, Family and Childhood Development	Datuk Francis Harden Hollis (Community Wellbeing)	SUPP	Simanggang	22 September 2021	3 January 2022
Assistant Minister of Welfare, Community Wellbeing, Women, Family and Childhood Development	Datuk Hajah Rosey Yunus (Women, Family and Childhood Development)	PBB	Bekenu	22 September 2021	3 January 2022
Assistant Minister of Youth and Sports	Datuk Snowdan Lawan	PRS	Balai Ringin	19 July 2017	3 January 2022

=== Ex-officio members ===
Officeholder	Portfolio
Datuk Amar Jaul Samion	State Secretary
Datuk Talat Mahmood Abdul Rashid	Attorney-General
Datu Dr. Haji Wan Lizozman Wan Omar	Financial Secretary
