= Second Abang Johari cabinet =

- 19th cabinet of Sarawak
- 2022–present
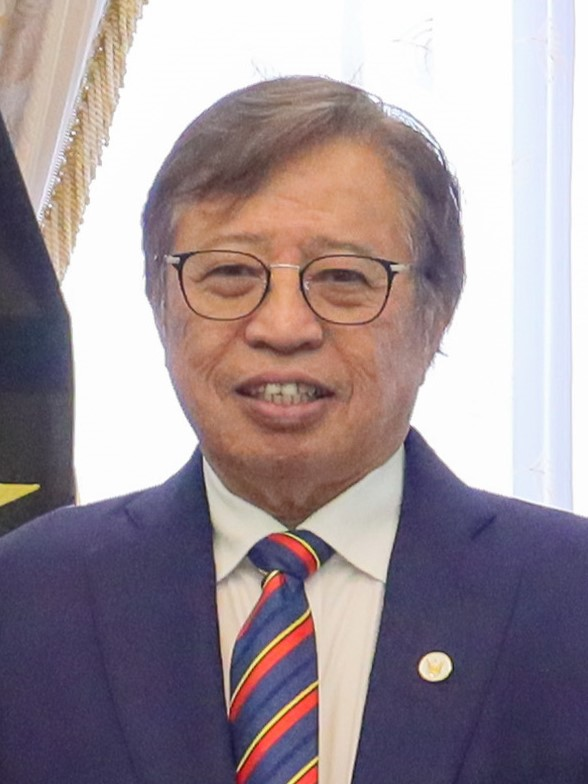
- Date formed: 4 January 2022

People and organisations
- Governor: Abdul Taib Mahmud (until 2024); Wan Junaidi Tuanku Jaafar (2024–present)
- Premier: Abang Abdul Rahman Zohari Abang Openg
- Member parties: Gabungan Parti Sarawak: Parti Pesaka Bumiputera Bersatu; Parti Rakyat Sarawak; Sarawak United Peoples' Party; Progressive Democratic Party
- Status in legislature: Supermajority (coalition) 79 / 82 (96%)
- Opposition parties: Parti Sarawak Bersatu; Pakatan Harapan; Democratic Action Party
- Opposition leaders: Wong Soon Koh (2021–2023); Chong Chieng Jen (2023–present)

History
- Election: 2021 state election
- Legislature term: 19th Legislative Assembly
- Predecessor: First Abang Johari cabinet

Abang Abdul Rahman Zohari Abang Openg formed the second Abang Johari cabinet after being invited by Abdul Taib Mahmud to begin a new government following the victory in the 18 December 2021 general election in the state of Sarawak, Malaysia. In order to be the Premier, Abang Johari was immediately sworn in before the Yang di-Pertua Negeri Sarawak on the same day that night. Prior to the election, Abang Johari led (as Premier) the first Abang Johari cabinet, a coalition government that consisted of members of the component parties of Gabungan Parti Sarawak (previously it was the Sarawak Barisan Nasional-led cabinet).

The new Cabinet line-up was announced by Abang Johari on 30 December 2021. The ministers and deputy ministers were then sworn in before the governor on 4 January 2022.

== Composition ==
=== Ministers ===
GPS (11)
PBB (8)	SUPP (2)	PRS (1)	PDP (0)

Portfolio	Officeholder	Party	Constituency	Term start	Term end
Premier	Datuk Patinggi Tan Sri (Dr.) Abang Haji Abdul Rahman Zohari bin Tun Datuk Abang Haji Openg	PBB	Gedong	18 December 2021	Incumbent
Deputy Premiers	Datuk Amar Douglas Uggah Embas	PBB	Bukit Saban	4 January 2022	Incumbent
Deputy Premiers	Datuk Amar Haji Awang Tengah bin Ali Hasan	PBB	Bukit Sari	4 January 2022	Incumbent
Deputy Premiers	Datuk Amar Prof. Dr. Sim Kui Hian	SUPP	Batu Kawah	4 January 2022	Incumbent
Minister in the Premier's Department	Dato Sri John Sikie Tayai	PRS	Kakus	4 January 2022	Incumbent
Minister for Finance and New Economy	Datuk Patinggi Tan Sri (Dr.) Abang Haji Abdul Rahman Zohari bin Tun Datuk Abang Haji Openg	PBB	Gedong	4 January 2022	Incumbent
Minister for Finance and New Economy	Datuk Amar Douglas Uggah Embas (as Second Minister)	PBB	Bukit Saban	4 January 2022	Incumbent
Minister for Natural Resources and Urban Development	Datuk Patinggi Tan Sri (Dr.) Abang Haji Abdul Rahman Zohari bin Tun Datuk Abang Haji Openg	PBB	Gedong	4 January 2022	Incumbent
Minister for Natural Resources and Urban Development	Datuk Amar Haji Awang Tengah bin Ali Hasan (as Second Minister)	PBB	Bukit Sari	4 January 2022	Incumbent
Minister for Energy and Environmental Sustainability	Datuk Patinggi Tan Sri (Dr.) Abang Haji Abdul Rahman Zohari bin Tun Datuk Abang Haji Openg	PBB	Gedong	4 January 2022	Incumbent
Minister for Infrastructure and Port Development	Datuk Amar Douglas Uggah Embas	PBB	Bukit Saban	4 January 2022	Incumbent
Minister for International Trade and Investment	Datuk Amar Haji Awang Tengah bin Ali Hasan	PBB	Bukit Sari	4 January 2022	Incumbent
Minister for Public Health, Housing and Local Government	Datuk Amar Prof. Dr. Sim Kui Hian	SUPP	Batu Kawah	4 January 2022	Incumbent
Minister for Modernisation of Agriculture and Regional Development	Dato Sri Dr. Stephen Rundi Utom	PBB	Kemena	4 January 2022	Incumbent
Minister for Transport	Dato Sri Lee Kim Shin	SUPP	Senadin	4 January 2022	Incumbent
Minister for Utility and Telecommunication	Dato Sri Julaihi Narawi	PBB	Sebuyau	4 January 2022	Incumbent
Minister for Tourism, Creative Industry and Performing Arts	Dato Sri Abdul Karim Rahman Hamzah	PBB	Asajaya	4 January 2022	Incumbent
Minister for Youth, Sport and Entrepreneur Development	Dato Sri Abdul Karim Rahman Hamzah	PBB	Asajaya	4 January 2022	Incumbent
Minister for Women, Childhood and Community Wellbeing Development	Dato Sri Hajah Fatimah Abdullah	PBB	Dalat	4 January 2022	Incumbent
Minister for Education, Innovation and Talent Development	Dato Sri Roland Sagah Wee Inn	PBB	Tarat	4 January 2022	Incumbent

=== Deputy Ministers ===
Please note that according to Article 7 of the Sarawak State Constitution, the deputy minister (formerly known as "assistant minister") is not considered a member of the cabinet. The list provided below is solely for informational purposes.

GPS (27)
PBB (18)	SUPP (3)	PRS (4)	PDP (2)

Portfolio	Officeholder	Party		Constituency	Term start	Term end
Deputy Minister in the Premier's Department	Datuk Hajjah Sharifah Hasidah binti Sayeed Aman Ghazali (Law, MA63 and State-Federal Relations)		PBB	Samariang	4 January 2022	Incumbent
Deputy Minister in the Premier's Department	Datuk Gerawat Gala (Labour, Immigration and Project Monitoring)		PBB	Mulu	4 January 2022	Incumbent
Deputy Minister in the Premier's Department	Datuk Abdullah bin Haji Saidol (Corporate Affairs and UKAS)		PBB	Semop	4 January 2022	Incumbent
Deputy Minister in the Premier's Department	Dato Murshid Diraja Dr. Juanda Jaya (Integrity and Ombudsman)		PBB	Jemoreng	4 January 2022	Incumbent
Deputy Minister in the Premier's Department	Datuk Jefferson Jamit anak Unyat (Native Law and Customs)		PBB	Bukit Goram	4 January 2022	Incumbent
Deputy Minister in the Premier's Department	Datuk Dr. Haji Abdul Rahman bin Haji Junaidi (DBKU, Islamic Affairs & Project Coordinator for Regional Development Agency)		PBB	Pantai Damai	17 March 2025	Incumbent
Deputy Minister for Natural Resources and Urban Development	Datu Haji Len Talif Salleh		PBB	Kuala Rajang	4 January 2022	Incumbent
Deputy Minister for Energy and Environmental Sustainability	Datuk Dr. Haji Hazland Abang Hipni		PBB	Demak Laut	4 January 2022	Incumbent
Deputy Minister for Infrastructure and Port Development	Datuk Ir. Aidel bin Lariwoo (Infrastructure Development)		PBB	Sadong Jaya	4 January 2022	Incumbent
Deputy Minister for Infrastructure and Port Development	Dato Majang anak Renggi (Port Development)		PRS	Samalaju	4 January 2022	Incumbent
Deputy Minister for International Trade and Investment	Datuk Dr. Malcom Mussen anak Lamoh		PRS	Batang Ai	4 January 2022	Incumbent
Deputy Minister for Public Health, Housing and Local Government	Datu Dr. Penguang anak Manggil (Public Health and Housing)		PDP	Marudi	4 January 2022	Incumbent
Deputy Minister for Public Health, Housing and Local Government	Datuk Michael Tiang Ming Tee (Local Government)		SUPP	Pelawan	4 January 2022	Incumbent
Deputy Minister for Modernisation of Agriculture and Regional Development	Datuk Dr. Haji Abdul Rahman bin Haji Ismail (Modernisation of Agriculture)	`	PBB	Bukit Kota	4 January 2022	Incumbent
Deputy Minister for Modernisation of Agriculture and Regional Development	Datuk Maclaine @ Martin Ben (Regional Development)		PBB	Kedup	4 January 2022	Incumbent
Deputy Minister for Transport	Datuk Dr. Jerip anak Susil		PBB	Mambong	4 January 2022	Incumbent
Deputy Minister for Transport	Dato Henry Harry anak Jinep		PDP	Tasik Biru	4 January 2022	Incumbent
Deputy Minister for Utility and Telecommunication	Datuk Dr. Haji Abdul Rahman bin Haji Junaidi (Utility)		PBB	Pantai Damai	4 January 2022	17 March 2025
Deputy Minister for Utility and Telecommunication	Datuk Ibrahim Baki (Utility)		PBB	Satok	17 March 2025	Incumbent
Deputy Minister for Utility and Telecommunication	Datuk Liwan Lagang (Telecommunication)		PRS	Belaga	4 January 2022	Incumbent
Deputy Minister for Tourism, Creative Industry and Performing Arts	Dato Sebastian Ting Chiew Yew (Tourism)		SUPP	Piasau	4 January 2022	Incumbent
Deputy Minister for Tourism, Creative Industry and Performing Arts	Datuk Snowdan anak Lawan (Creative Industry and Performing Arts)		PRS	Balai Ringin	4 January 2022	Incumbent
Deputy Minister for Youth, Sport and Entrepreneur Development	Dato Gerald Rentap Jabu (Youth and Sport Development)		PBB	Layar	4 January 2022	Incumbent
Deputy Minister for Youth, Sport and Entrepreneur Development	Datuk Dr. Ripin bin Lamat (Entrepreneur Development)		PBB	Lambir	4 January 2022	Incumbent
Deputy Minister for Women, Early Childhood and Community Wellbeing Development	Datuk Hajah Rosey Haji Yunus (Women and Early Childhood Development)		PBB	Bekenu	4 January 2022	Incumbent
Deputy Minister for Women, Early Childhood and Community Wellbeing Development	Datuk Ricky @ Mohd Razi bin Sitam (Community Wellbeing Development)		PBB	Saribas	4 January 2022	Incumbent
Deputy Minister for Education, Innovation and Talent Development	Datuk Dr. Haji Annuar bin Rapaee (Education and Innovation)		PBB	Nangka	4 January 2022	Incumbent
Deputy Minister for Education, Innovation and Talent Development	Datuk Francis Harden anak Hollis (Talent Development)		SUPP	Simanggang	4 January 2022	Incumbent
