= 19th Sarawak State Legislative Assembly =

Present term of the legislature of Sarawak, Malaysia

←	18th Assembly	20th Assembly	→

Overview
- Legislative body: Sarawak State Legislative Assembly
- Jurisdiction: Sarawak
- Meeting place: Sarawak State Legislative Assembly Building
- Term: 14 February 2022 – 26 October 2026
- Election: 2021 state election
- Government: Second Abang Johari cabinet
- Website: duns.sarawak.gov.my
- Members: 82
- Governor: Abdul Taib Mahmud (until 26 January 2024); Wan Junaidi Tuanku Jaafar (from 26 January 2024)
- Speaker: Mohamad Asfia Awang Nassar
- Deputy Speaker: Idris Buang
- Premier: Abang Abdul Rahman Zohari Abang Openg
- Leader of the Opposition: Wong Soon Koh (until 20 November 2023); Chong Chieng Jen (since 20 November 2023)
- Party control: Gabungan Parti Sarawak (GPS)

Sessions
- 1st: 1st Meeting: 14 February 2022 – 16 February 2022; 2nd Meeting: 17 May 2022 – 26 May 2022; 3rd Meeting: 21 November 2022- 1 December 2022
- 2nd: 1st Meeting: 15 May 2023 – 24 May 2023; 2nd Meeting: 20 November 2023 – 29 November 2023
- 3rd: 1st Meeting: 6 May 2024 – 15 May 2024; 2nd Meeting: 11 November 2024 – 20 November 2024
- 4th: 1st Meeting: 19 May 2025 – 28 May 2025; Special Meeting: 7 July 2025; 2nd Meeting: 24 November 2025 – 3 December 2025
- 5th: 1st Meeting: 11 May 2026 – 20 May 2026; 2nd Meeting: 12 October 2026 – 21 October 2026

The 19th Sarawak State Legislative Assembly is the present term of the Sarawak State Legislative Assembly, the legislative branch of the Government of Sarawak in Sarawak, Malaysia. The 19th Assembly consists of 82 members that were elected in the 2021 Sarawak state election. The term will last for five years in maximum from the first sitting.

== Officeholders ==
=== Speakership ===
- Speaker: Mohamad Asfia Awang Nassar (non-MLA)
- Deputy Speaker: Idris Buang (Muara Tuang MLA)

=== Other parliamentary officers ===
- Secretary: Nur Azhar Bujang
- Acting Deputy Secretary: Abang Mohammad Adib Abang Sallehadin
- Serjeants-at-Arms:

=== Party leaders ===
==== Government ====
- Leader of Gabungan Parti Sarawak (GPS) and the component party, Parti Pesaka Bumiputera Bersatu (PBB): Abang Abdul Rahman Zohari Abang Openg (Premier & Gedong MLA)
  - Leader of the Sarawak United Peoples' Party (SUPP): Sim Kui Hian (Deputy Premier & Batu Kawah MLA)
  - Leader of the Sarawak Peoples' Party (PRS): John Sikie Tayai (Minister & Kakus MLA)
  - Leader of the Progressive Democratic Party (PDP): Tiong King Sing (Dudong MLA)

==== Opposition ====
- Leader of Pakatan Harapan (PH) of Sarawak and the component party, Democratic Action Party (DAP) of Sarawak: Chong Chieng Jen (Leader of the Opposition & Padungan MLA)

=== Whips ===
- Government Whip: Ibrahim Baki (GPS-PBB)
- Opposition Whip: Vacant

== Composition ==
Government + Confidence and supply (80)					Opposition (2)
GPS				IND	PH
79				1	2
47	13	11	8	1	2
PBB	SUPP	PRS	PDP	IND	DAP

Party representation in the 19th Assembly
Affiliation	Members	
Affiliation	At 2021 election	Current
Gabungan Parti Sarawak	76	79
Parti Pesaka Bumiputera Bersatu	47	47
Sarawak United Peoples' Party	13	13
Sarawak Peoples' Party	11	11
Progressive Democratic Party	5	8
Government total	76	79
Parti Sarawak Bersatu	4	0
Pakatan Harapan	2	2
Democratic Action Party	2	2
Opposition total	6	2
Independent	0	1
Confidence and supply total	0	1
Total	82	82
Working government majority	70	80
Vacant	0	0

== Members ==
=== List ===
No.	Parliamentary Constituency	No.	State Constituency	Member	Coalition (Party)	Position
GPS 79 | PH 2 | IND 1
P192	Mas Gading	N01	Opar	Billy Sujang	GPS (SUPP)	
P192	Mas Gading	N02	Tasik Biru	Henry Harry Jinep	GPS (PDP)	Deputy Minister
P193	Santubong	N03	Tanjong Datu	Azizul Annuar Adenan	GPS (PBB)	
P193	Santubong	N04	Pantai Damai	Abdul Rahman Junaidi	GPS (PBB)	Deputy Minister
P193	Santubong	N05	Demak Laut	Hazland Abang Hipni	GPS (PBB)	Deputy Minister
P194	Petra Jaya	N06	Tupong	Fazzrudin Abdul Rahman	GPS (PBB)	Chief Political Secretary to the Premier
P194	Petra Jaya	N07	Samariang	Sharifah Hasidah Sayeed Aman Ghazali	GPS (PBB)	Deputy Minister
P194	Petra Jaya	N08	Satok	Ibrahim Baki	GPS (PBB)	Deputy Minister / GPS Chief Whip
P195	Bandar Kuching	N09	Padungan	Chong Chieng Jen	PH (DAP)	MP of Stampin / Leader of the Opposition
P195	Bandar Kuching	N10	Pending	Violet Yong Wui Wui	PH (DAP)	
P195	Bandar Kuching	N11	Batu Lintang	See Chee How	IND	
P196	Stampin	N12	Kota Sentosa	Wilfred Yap Yau Sin	GPS (SUPP)	
P196	Stampin	N13	Batu Kitang	Lo Khere Chiang	GPS (SUPP)	
P196	Stampin	N14	Batu Kawah	Sim Kui Hian	GPS (SUPP)	Deputy Premier
P197	Kota Samarahan	N15	Asajaya	Abdul Karim Rahman Hamzah	GPS (PBB)	Minister
P197	Kota Samarahan	N16	Muara Tuang	Idris Buang	GPS (PBB)	Deputy Speaker
P197	Kota Samarahan	N17	Stakan	Hamzah Brahim	GPS (PBB)	Political Secretary to the Minister of Energy Transition and Public Utilities
P198	Puncak Borneo	N18	Serembu	Miro Simuh	GPS (PBB)	
P198	Puncak Borneo	N19	Mambong	Jerip Susil	GPS (PBB)	Deputy Minister
P198	Puncak Borneo	N20	Tarat	Roland Sagah Wee Inn	GPS (PBB)	Minister
P199	Serian	N21	Tebedu	Simon Sinang Bada	GPS (PBB)	
P199	Serian	N22	Kedup	Martin Ben	GPS (PBB)	Deputy Minister
P199	Serian	N23	Bukit Semuja	John Ilus	GPS (PBB)	
P200	Batang Sadong	N24	Sadong Jaya	Aidel Lariwoo	GPS (PBB)	Deputy Minister
P200	Batang Sadong	N25	Simunjan	Awla Dris	GPS (PBB)	
P200	Batang Sadong	N26	Gedong	Abang Abdul Rahman Zohari Abang Openg	GPS (PBB)	Premier
P201	Batang Lupar	N27	Sebuyau	Julaihi Narawi	GPS (PBB)	Minister
P201	Batang Lupar	N28	Lingga	Dayang Noorazah Awang Sohor	GPS (PBB)	
P201	Batang Lupar	N29	Beting Maro	Razaili Gapor	GPS (PBB)	
P202	Sri Aman	N30	Balai Ringin	Snowdan Lawan	GPS (PRS)	Deputy Minister
P202	Sri Aman	N31	Bukit Begunan	Mong Dagang	GPS (PRS)	
P202	Sri Aman	N32	Simanggang	Francis Harden Hollis	GPS (SUPP)	Deputy Minister
P203	Lubok Antu	N33	Engkilili	Johnical Rayong Ngipa	GPS (PDP)	
P203	Lubok Antu	N34	Batang Ai	Malcom Mussen Lamoh	GPS (PRS)	Deputy Minister
P204	Betong	N35	Saribas	Ricky @ Mohamad Razi Sitam	GPS (PBB)	Deputy Minister
P204	Betong	N36	Layar	Gerald Rentap Jabu	GPS (PBB)	Deputy Minister
P204	Betong	N37	Bukit Saban	Douglas Uggah Embas	GPS (PBB)	Deputy Premier
P205	Saratok	N38	Kalaka	Mohamad Duri	GPS (PBB)	
P205	Saratok	N39	Krian	Friday Belik	GPS (PDP)	
P205	Saratok	N40	Kabong	Mohd Chee Kadir	GPS (PBB)	
P206	Tanjong Manis	N41	Kuala Rajang	Talif @ Len bin Salleh	GPS (PBB)	Deputy Minister
P206	Tanjong Manis	N42	Semop	Abdullah Saidol	GPS (PBB)	Deputy Minister
P207	Igan	N43	Daro	Safiee Ahmad	GPS (PBB)	
P207	Igan	N44	Jemoreng	Juanda Jaya	GPS (PBB)	Deputy Minister
P208	Sarikei	N45	Repok	Huang Tiong Sii	GPS (SUPP)	Federal Deputy Minister; MP of Sarikei
P208	Sarikei	N46	Meradong	Ding Kuong Hiing	GPS (SUPP)	
P209	Julau	N47	Pakan	William Mawan Ikom	GPS (PBB)	
P209	Julau	N48	Meluan	Rolland Duat Jubin	GPS (PDP)	
P210	Kanowit	N49	Ngemah	Anyi Jana	GPS (PRS)	
P210	Kanowit	N50	Machan	Allan Siden Gramong	GPS (PBB)	
P211	Lanang	N51	Bukit Assek	Joseph Chieng Jin Ek	GPS (SUPP)	
P211	Lanang	N52	Dudong	Tiong King Sing	GPS (PDP)	Federal Minister; MP of Bintulu
P212	Sibu	N53	Bawang Assan	Wong Soon Koh	GPS (PDP)	
P212	Sibu	N54	Pelawan	Michael Tiang Ming Tee	GPS (SUPP)	Deputy Minister
P212	Sibu	N55	Nangka	Annuar Rapaee	GPS (PBB)	Deputy Minister
P213	Mukah	N56	Dalat	Fatimah Abdullah	GPS (PBB)	Minister
P213	Mukah	N57	Tellian	Royston Valentine	GPS (PBB)	
P213	Mukah	N58	Balingian	Abdul Yakub Arbi	GPS (PBB)	
P214	Selangau	N59	Tamin	Christopher Gira Sambang	GPS (PRS)	
P214	Selangau	N60	Kakus	John Sikie Tayai	GPS (PRS)	Minister
P215	Kapit	N61	Pelagus	Wilson Nyabong Ijang	GPS (PRS)	
P215	Kapit	N62	Katibas	Lidam Assan	GPS (PBB)	
P215	Kapit	N63	Bukit Goram	Jefferson Jamit Unyat	GPS (PBB)	Deputy Minister
P216	Hulu Rajang	N64	Baleh	Nicholas Kudi Jantai Masing	GPS (PRS)	
P216	Hulu Rajang	N65	Belaga	Liwan Lagang	GPS (PRS)	Deputy Minister
P216	Hulu Rajang	N66	Murum	Kennedy Chukpai Ugon	GPS (PRS)	
P217	Bintulu	N67	Jepak	Iskandar Turkee	GPS (PBB)	
P217	Bintulu	N68	Tanjong Batu	Johnny Pang Leong Ming	GPS (SUPP)	
P217	Bintulu	N69	Kemena	Stephen Rundi Utom	GPS (PBB)	Minister
P217	Bintulu	N70	Samalaju	Majang Renggi	GPS (PRS)	Deputy Minister
P218	Sibuti	N71	Bekenu	Rosey Yunus	GPS (PBB)	Deputy Minister
P218	Sibuti	N72	Lambir	Ripin Lamat	GPS (PBB)	Deputy Minister
P219	Miri	N73	Piasau	Sebastian Ting Chiew Yew	GPS (SUPP)	Deputy Minister
P219	Miri	N74	Pujut	Adam Yii Siew Sang	GPS (SUPP)	Mayor of Miri City Council
P219	Miri	N75	Senadin	Lee Kim Shin	GPS (SUPP)	Minister
P220	Baram	N76	Marudi	Penguang Manggil	GPS (PDP)	Deputy Minister
P220	Baram	N77	Telang Usan	Dennis Ngau	GPS (PBB)	
P220	Baram	N78	Mulu	Gerawat Gala	GPS (PBB)	Deputy Minister
P221	Limbang	N79	Bukit Kota	Abdul Rahman Ismail	GPS (PBB)	Deputy Minister
P221	Limbang	N80	Batu Danau	Paulus Palu Gumbang	GPS (PBB)	
P222	Lawas	N81	Ba'kelalan	Baru Bian	GPS (PDP)	
P222	Lawas	N82	Bukit Sari	Awang Tengah Ali Hasan	GPS (PBB)	Deputy Premier

== Committees ==
The following members of committees has been appointed as of 8 May 2024.

=== Committee of Selection and Standing Orders ===
Member	Party	Constituency
Mohamad Asfia Awang Nassar, Chairman	GPS (PBB)	Non-MLA
Abang Abdul Rahman Zohari Abang Openg, Premier	GPS (PBB)	Gedong
Douglas Uggah Embas	GPS (PBB)	Bukit Saban
Awang Tengah Ali Hasan	GPS (PBB)	Bukit Sari
Sim Kui Hian	GPS (SUPP)	Batu Kawah
John Sikie Tayai	GPS (PRS)	Kakus

=== Public Accounts Committee ===
Member	Party	Constituency
Razaili Gapor, Chairman	GPS (PBB)	Beting Maro
Lo Khere Chiang	GPS (SUPP)	Batu Kitang
Mohd Chee Kadir	GPS (PBB)	Kabong
See Chee How	Independent	Batu Lintang
Wilson Nyabong Ijang	GPS (PRS)	Pelagus
Miro Simuh	GPS (PBB)	Serembu
Rolland Duat Jubin	GPS (PDP)	Meluan

=== House Committee ===
Member	Party	Constituency
Mohamad Asfia Awang Nassar, Chairman	GPS (PBB)	-
Fatimah Abdullah	GPS (PBB)	Dalat
Stephen Rundi Utom	GPS (PBB)	Kemena
Lee Kim Shin	GPS (SUPP)	Senadin
Julaihi Narawi	GPS (PBB)	Sebuyau
Francis Harden Hollis	GPS (SUPP)	Simanggang
Henry Harry Jinep	GPS (PDP)	Tasik Biru

=== Public Petitions Committee ===
Member	Party	Constituency
Mohamad Asfia Awang Nassar, Chairman	GPS (PBB)	-
Roland Sagah Wee Inn	GPS (PBB)	Tarat
Jerip Susil	GPS (PBB)	Mambong
Liwan Lagang	GPS (PRS)	Belaga
Penguang Manggil	GPS (PDP)	Marudi
Sebastian Ting Chiew Yew	GPS (SUPP)	Piasau
Aidel Lariwoo	GPS (PBB)	Sadong Jaya

=== Committee of Privileges ===
Member	Party	Constituency
Mohamad Asfia Awang Nassar, chairman	GPS (PBB)	-
Douglas Uggah Embas	GPS (PBB)	Bukit Saban
Awang Tengah Ali Hasan	GPS (PBB)	Bukit Sari
Sim Kui Hian	GPS (SUPP)	Batu Kawah
Abdul Karim Rahman Hamzah	GPS (PBB)	Asajaya
Sharifah Hasidah Sayeed Aman Ghazali	GPS (PBB)	Samariang
Malcom Mussen Lamoh	GPS (PRS)	Batang Ai
Idris Buang	GPS (PBB)	Muara Tuang

=== Dewan Negeri Event Committee ===
Member	Party	Constituency
Rosey Yunus, Chairwoman	GPS (PBB)	Bekenu
Len Talif Salleh	GPS (PBB)	Kuala Rajang
Abdul Rahman Junaidi	GPS (PBB)	Pantai Damai
Abdul Rahman Ismail	GPS (PBB)	Bukit Kota
Annuar Rapaee	GPS (PBB)	Nangka
Snowdan Lawan	GPS (PRS)	Balai Ringin
Abdullah Saidol	GPS (PBB)	Semop
Michael Tiang Ming Tee	GPS (SUPP)	Pelawan
Ding Kuong Hiing	GPS (SUPP)	Meradong
Christopher Gira Sambang	GPS (PRS)	Tamin
Abdul Yakub Arbi	GPS (PBB)	Balingian
Safiee Ahmad	GPS (PBB)	Daro
Hamzah Brahim	GPS (PBB)	Stakan
Dayang Noorazah Awang Sohor	GPS (PBB)	Lingga
Friday Belik	GPS (PDP)	Krian
Johnny Pang Leong Ming	GPS (SUPP)	Tanjong Batu

== Seating plan ==
				Sergeant-at-Arm
		N38 Kalaka	N58 Balingian		N65 Belaga (Deputy Minister)	N35 Saribas (Deputy Minister)	N29 Beting Maro
	N67 Jepak	N12 Kota Sentosa	N48 Meluan		N19 Mambong (Deputy Minister)	N22 Kedup (Deputy Minister)	N77 Telang Usan
	N68 Tanjong Batu	N3 Tanjong Datu	N59 Tamin		N32 Simanggang (Deputy Minister)	N5 Demak Laut (Deputy Minister)	N80 Batu Danau
	N64 Baleh	N1 Opar	N25 Simunjan		N78 Mulu (Deputy Minister)	N72 Lambir (Deputy Minister)	N31 Bukit Begunan
Vacant	N62 Katibas	N21 Tebedu	N23 Bukit Semuja		N16 Muara Tuang (Deputy Speaker)	N24 Sadong Jaya (Deputy Minister)	N47 Pakan	Vacant
Vacant	N57 Tellian	N28 Lingga	N18 Serembu		N20 Tarat (Minister)	N73 Piasau (Deputy Minister)	N6 Tupong	Vacant
Vacant	N51 Bukit Assek	N74 Pujut	N53 Bawang Assan		N27 Sebuyau (Minister)	N42 Semop (Deputy Minister)	N45 Repok	Vacant
Vacant	N49 Ngemah	N17 Stakan	N61 Pelagus		N60 Kakus (Minister)	N30 Balai Ringin (Deputy Minister)	N52 Dudong	Vacant
			N40 Kabong		N75 Senadin (Minister)
Vacant	N39 Krian	N50 Machan	N13 Batu Kitang		N15 Asajaya (Minister)	N76 Marudi (Deputy Minister)	N8 Satok (Deputy Minister)	Vacant
Vacant	N81 Ba'kelalan	N66 Murum	N46 Meradong		N69 Kemena (Minister)	N55 Nangka (Deputy Minister)	N54 Pelawan (Deputy Minister)	Vacant
Vacant	N33 Engkilili	N43 Daro	Vacant		N56 Dalat (Minister)	N79 Bukit Kota (Deputy Minister)	N63 Bukit Goram (Deputy Minister)	Vacant
Vacant	Vacant	Vacant	N11 Batu Lintang		N14 Batu Kawah (Deputy Premier)	N34 Batang Ai (Deputy Minister)	N70 Samalaju (Deputy Minister)	Vacant
	Vacant	Vacant	Vacant		N82 Bukit Sari (Deputy Premier)	N7 Samariang (Deputy Minister)	N36 Layar (Deputy Minister)
	Vacant	Vacant	N10 Pending		N37 Bukit Saban (Deputy Premier)	N4 Pantai Damai (Deputy Minister)	N44 Jemoreng (Deputy Minister)
	Vacant	Vacant	N9 Padungan (Opposition Leader)	the Mace	N26 Gedong (Premier)	N41 Kuala Rajang (Deputy Minister)	N2 Tasik Biru (Deputy Minister)
	Vacant	Vacant		Secretary		N71 Bekenu (Deputy Minister)	Vacant
				Speaker
				Yang di-Pertua Negeri
