= Johari cabinet =

Johari Cabinet is the name of either of two cabinets of Sarawak:

- Abang Johari Cabinet I (2017–2021)
- Abang Johari Cabinet II (2021–present)
