= 18th Sarawak State Legislative Assembly =

Term of the state legislature of Sarawak, Malaysia

←	17th Assembly	19th Assembly	→
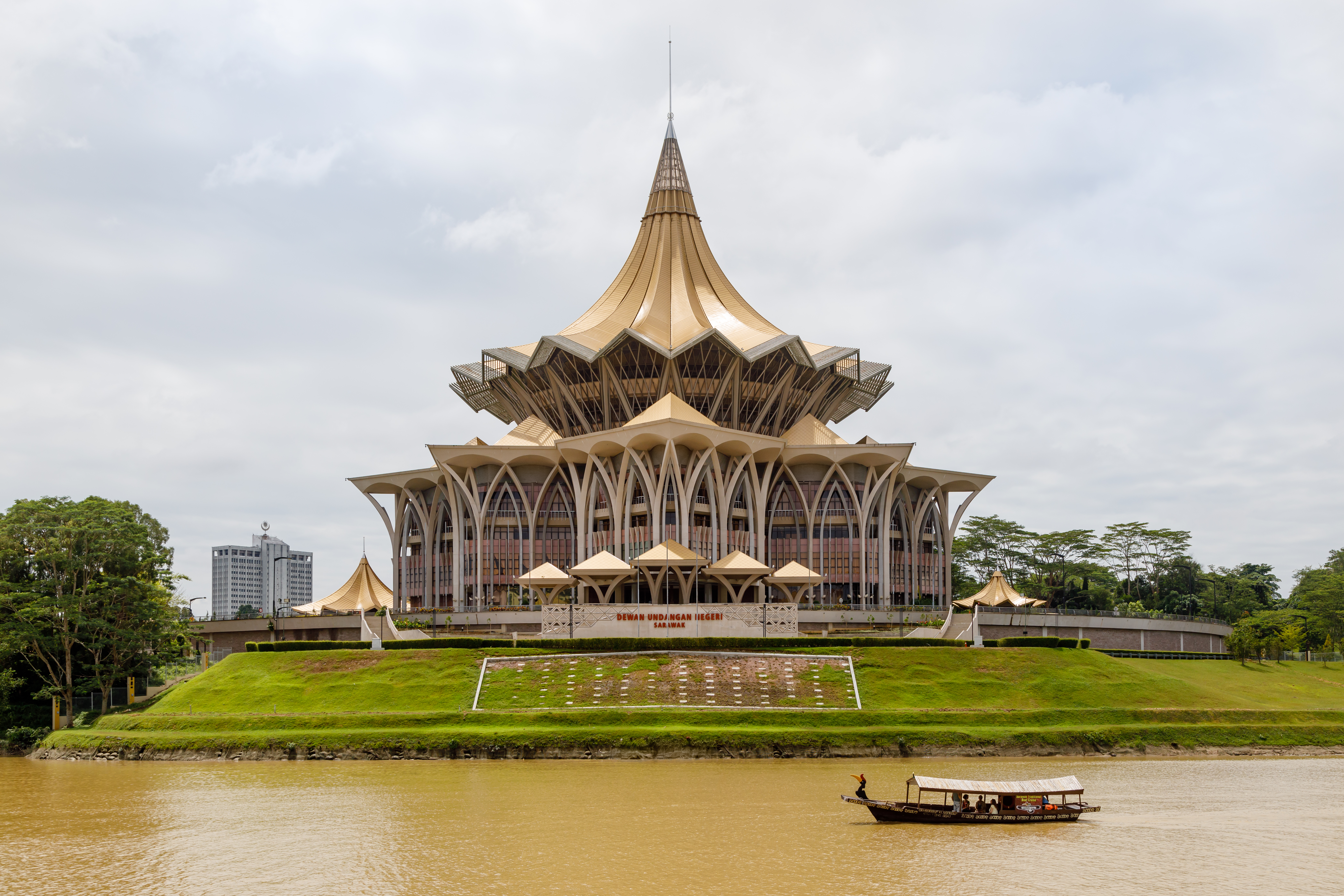
- Sarawak State Legislative Assembly Building, Kuching

Overview
- Legislative body: Sarawak State Legislative Assembly
- Jurisdiction: Sarawak
- Meeting place: Sarawak State Legislative Assembly Building
- Term: 7 June 2016 – 3 November 2021
- Election: 2016 Sarawak state election
- Government: Second Adenan cabinet Johari cabinet
- Website: duns.sarawak.gov.my
- Members: 82
- Speaker: Mohamad Asfia Awang Nasar
- Deputy Speaker: Gerawat Gala
- Chief Minister: Abang Abdul Rahman Johari Abang Openg
- Leader of the Opposition: Chong Chieng Jen (until 8 November 2020); Wong Soon Koh (from 9 November 2020)
- Party control: Gabungan Parti Sarawak coalition
- Yang di-Pertua Negeri: Abdul Taib Mahmud

Sessions
- 1st: 7 June 2016 – ?
- 2nd: ? – 17 November 2017
- 3rd: 9 July 2018 – 14 November 2018
- 4th: 29 April 2019 – 13 November 2019
- 5th: 11 May 2020 – ?
- 6th: ? – 3 November 2021

The 18th Sarawak State Legislative Assembly was a term of the Sarawak State Legislative Assembly, the legislative branch of the Government of Sarawak in Sarawak, Malaysia. The 18th Assembly consisted of 82 members that were elected in the 2016 state election and served from 7 June 2016 until 3 November 2021.

The legislature would, in normal circumstances, have dissolved automatically at the expiration of the five-year term on 6 June 2021 per the Sarawak constitution, but it was overridden by an ongoing emergency declaration at the federal level arising from the 2020–21 Malaysian political crisis and the COVID-19 pandemic in Malaysia. The subsequent state election has also been delayed. The emergency declaration was however ended several months earlier than scheduled and the legislature was dissolved on the same day.

== Background ==
Following the state election that was held on 7 May 2016, Barisan Nasional was able to form the next state government with a majority of 72 seats out of 82. There were several candidates from breakaway parties such as TERAS and UPP that had their members contest seats under the Barisan banner as direct election candidates under a deal by Adenan Satem after their parties were prevented from joining Barisan after opposition from parties such as PDP and SUPP. On 12 June 2018, all Sarawak-based BN parties including Parti Pesaka Bumiputera Bersatu (PBB), Parti Rakyat Sarawak (PRS), Progressive Democratic Party (PDP) and Sarawak United People's Party (SUPP) officially left Barisan Nasional forming a new coalition Sarawak Parties Alliance due to Barisan Nasional's defeat in general elections on 9 May 2018.

== Officeholders ==
=== Speakership ===
- Speaker: Mohamad Asfia Awang Nasar (non-MLA)
- Deputy Speaker: Gerawat Jala (GPS-PBB)

=== Other parliamentary officers ===
- Secretary:
  - Semawi bin Mohamad ( – 2 September 2019)
  - Pele Peter Tinggom (3 September 2019 – )
- Deputy Secretary: Sharifah Shazzea binti Wan Akil
- Serjeants-at-Arms:
  - Johari bin Mudin
  - Ismail bin Ali
  - Abang Nasiruddin bin Abang Mohamad Khalid
  - Hadyan bin Abdul Rahman
  - Lydwilkyn Andar Anak Umbar
  - Hanimasra Bin Hamden

=== Party leaders ===
- Chief Minister: Abang Abdul Rahman Zohari Abang Openg (Parti Pesaka Bumiputera Bersatu)
- Deputy Chief Ministers:
  - Douglas Uggah Embas (Parti Pesaka Bumiputera Bersatu)
  - Awang Tengah Ali Hasan (Parti Pesaka Bumiputera Bersatu)
- Leader of the Opposition: Wong Soon Koh (United Sarawak Party)
- Leader of the Democratic Action Party: Chong Chieng Jen
- Leader of the Malaysian United Indigenous Party: Ali Biju

=== Floor leaders ===
- Leader of the House:
- Shadow Leader of the House:

=== Whips ===
- Government Whip:
- Opposition Whip:

== Committees ==
The fifth session of the 18th Assembly consists of 6 select committees:

Select committees of the 5th session of the 18th Assembly
Committee	Chairperson	Government–Opposition divide
Standing Orders and Selection Committee	Mohamad Asfia Awang Nasar (Speaker)	5–0
Public Accounts Committee	Aidel Lariwoo (PBB)	5–2
House Committee	Mohamad Asfia Awang Nasar (Speaker)	6–0
Public Petitions Committee	Mohamad Asfia Awang Nasar (Speaker)	6–0
Committee of Privileges	Mohamad Asfia Awang Nasar (Speaker)	7–0
Events Committee	Mohd Naroden Majais (PBB)	16–0

== Members ==
=== Party representation ===
18th Legislative Assembly

At dissolution (3 November 2021)

30 May 2020

14 April 2020

28 February 2020

At the 2016 election (7 May 2016)

Party representation in the 18th Assembly
Affiliation	Members	
Affiliation	At 2016 election	At dissolution
Gabungan Parti Sarawak	—	67
Parti Pesaka Bumiputera Bersatu	—	47
Parti Rakyat Sarawak	—	10
Sarawak United Peoples' Party	—	7
Progressive Democratic Party	—	3
Barisan Nasional	72	0
No party	11	0
Parti Pesaka Bumiputera Bersatu	39	—
Parti Rakyat Sarawak	11	—
Sarawak United Peoples' Party	7	—
Progressive Democratic Party	4	—
Government total	72	67
Malaysian United Indigenous Party	0	1
Confidence and supply total	0	1
Parti Sarawak Bersatu	0	6
Pakatan Harapan	10	5
Democratic Action Party	7	5
People's Justice Party	3	0
Independent	0	1
Opposition total	10	12
Total	82	80
Working government majority	62	56
Vacant	0	2

=== Membership changes ===
Membership changes in the 18th Assembly
Seat	Before		Change		After		
Seat	Member	Party	Type	Date	Date	Member	Party
Dudong	Tiong Thai King	BN	Change of party			Tiong Thai King	PSB
Bawang Assan	Wong Soon Koh	BN	Change of party			Wong Soon Koh	PSB
Opar	Ranum Anak Mina	BN	Change of party	11 August 2016		Ranum Anak Mina	PSB
Engkilili	Johnical Rayong Ngipa	BN	Change of party	12 August 2016		Johnical Rayong Ngipa	PSB
Mambong	Jerip Susil	BN	Change of party	13 August 2016		Jerip Susil	PSB
Mambong	Jerip Susil	PSB	Change of party	?		Jerip Susil	PBB
Serembu	Miro Simuh	BN	Party membership within coalition	16 August 2016		Miro Simuh	BN–PBB
Bukit Semuja	John Ilus	BN	Party membership within coalition	16 August 2016		John Ilus	BN–PBB
Bekenu	Rosey Yunus	BN	Party membership within coalition	16 August 2016		Rosey Yunus	BN–PBB
Mulu	Gerawat Jala	BN	Party membership within coalition	16 August 2016		Gerawat Jala	BN–PBB
Batu Danau	Paulus Gumbang	BN	Party membership within coalition	16 August 2016		Paulus Gumbang	BN–PBB
Tanjong Datu	Adenan Satem	BN–PBB	Death	11 January 2017	18 February 2017	Jamilah Anu	BN–PBB
All BN members		BN	Departure from coalition and formation of new coalition	12 June 2018		All BN members	GPS
Pujut	Ting Tiong Choon	PH–DAP	Disqualification	11 February 2020		Vacant	
Krian	Ali Biju	PH–PKR	Departure from party	24 February 2020		Ali Biju	Independent
Ba'kelalan	Baru Bian	PH–PKR	Departure from party	24 February 2020		Baru Bian	Independent
Krian	Ali Biju	Independent	Party membership	28 February 2020		Ali Biju	PN-BERSATU
Batu Lintang	See Chee How	PH-PKR	Expulsion from party	14 April 2020		See Chee How	Independent
Ba'kelalan	Baru Bian	Independent	Party membership	30 May 2020		Baru Bian	PSB
Batu Lintang	See Chee How	Independent	Party membership	30 May 2020		See Chee How	PSB
Padungan	Wong King Wei	PH–DAP	Departure from party	26 July 2020		Wong King Wei	Independent

=== List ===
Members of the 18th Assembly at dissolution
No.	Constituency	Member	Party/coalition
N1	Opar	Ranum Anak Mina	PSB
N2	Tasik Biru	Henry Jinep	GPS (PDP)
N3	Tanjong Datu	Jamilah Anu	GPS (PBB)
N4	Pantai Damai	Abdul Rahman Junaidi	GPS (PBB)
N5	Demak Laut	Hazland Abang Hipni	GPS (PBB)
N6	Tupong	Fazzrudin Abdul Rahman	GPS (PBB)
N7	Samariang	Sharifah Hasidah Sayeed Aman Ghazali	GPS (PBB)
N8	Satok	Abang Abdul Rahman Zohari Abang Openg	GPS (PBB)
N9	Padungan	Wong King Wei	Independent
N10	Pending	Violet Yong Wui Wui	PH (DAP)
N11	Batu Lintang	See Chee How	PSB
N12	Kota Sentosa	Chong Chieng Jen	PH (DAP)
N13	Batu Kitang	Lo Khere Chiang	GPS (SUPP)
N14	Batu Kawah	Sim Kui Hian	GPS (SUPP)
N15	Asajaya	Abdul Karim Rahman Hamzah	GPS (PBB)
N16	Muara Tuang	Idris Buang	GPS (PBB)
N17	Stakan	Mohamad Ali Mahmud	GPS (PBB)
N18	Serembu	Miro Simuh	GPS (PBB)
N19	Mambong	Jerip Susil	GPS (PBB)
N20	Tarat	Roland Sagah Wee Inn	GPS (PBB)
N21	Tebedu	Michael Manyin Jawong	GPS (PBB)
N22	Kedup	Maclaine Ben @ Martin Ben	GPS (PBB)
N23	Bukit Semuja	John Ilus	GPS (PBB)
N24	Sadong Jaya	Aidel Lariwoo	GPS (PBB)
N25	Simunjan	Awla Idris	GPS (PBB)
N26	Gedong	Mohd Naroden Majais	GPS (PBB)
N27	Sebuyau	Julaihi Narawi	GPS (PBB)
N28	Lingga	Simoi Peri	GPS (PBB)
N29	Beting Maro	Razaili Gapor	GPS (PBB)
N30	Balai Ringin	Snowdan Lawan	GPS (PRS)
N31	Bukit Begunan	Mong Dagang	GPS (PRS)
N32	Simanggang	Francis Harden Hollis	GPS (SUPP)
N33	Engkilili	Johnical Rayong Ngipa	PSB
N34	Batang Ai	Malcom Mussen Lamoh	GPS (PRS)
N35	Saribas	Ricky @ Mohamad Razi bin Sitam	GPS (PBB)
N36	Layar	Gerald Rentap Jabu	GPS (PBB)
N37	Bukit Saban	Douglas Uggah Embas	GPS (PBB)
N38	Kalaka	Abdul Wahab Aziz	GPS (PBB)
N39	Krian	Ali Biju	PN (BERSATU)
N40	Kabong	Mohd Chee Kadir	GPS (PBB)
N41	Kuala Rajang	Len Talif Salleh	GPS (PBB)
N42	Semop	Abdullah Saidol	GPS (PBB)
N43	Daro	Safiee Ahmad	GPS (PBB)
N44	Jemoreng	Juanda Jaya	GPS (PBB)
N45	Repok	Huang Tiong Sii	GPS (SUPP)
N46	Meradong	Ding Kuong Hiing	GPS (SUPP)
N47	Pakan	William Mawan Ikom	GPS (PBB)
N48	Meluan	Rolland Duat Jubin	GPS (PDP)
N49	Ngemah	Alexander Vincent	GPS (PRS)
N50	Machan	Allan Siden Gramong	GPS (PBB)
N51	Bukit Assek	Irene Mary Chang Oi Ling	PH (DAP)
N52	Dudong	Tiong Thai King	PSB
N53	Bawang Assan	Wong Soon Koh	PSB
N54	Pelawan	David Wong Kee Woan	PH (DAP)
N55	Nangka	Annuar Rapaee	GPS (PBB)
N56	Dalat	Fatimah Abdullah	GPS (PBB)
N57	Tellian	Yussibnosh Balo	GPS (PBB)
N58	Balingian	Abdul Yakub Arbi	GPS (PBB)
N59	Tamin	Christopher Gira Sambang	GPS (PRS)
N60	Kakus	John Sikie Tayai	GPS (PRS)
N61	Pelagus	Wilson Nyabong Ijang	GPS (PRS)
N62	Katibas	Ambrose Blikau Enturan	GPS (PBB)
N63	Bukit Goram	Jefferson Jamit Unyat	GPS (PBB)
N64	Baleh	Vacant	
N65	Belaga	Liwan Lagang	GPS (PRS)
N66	Murum	Chukpai Ugon	GPS (PRS)
N67	Jepak	Talip Zulpilip	GPS (PBB)
N68	Tanjong Batu	Chiew Chiu Sing	PH (DAP)
N69	Kemena	Stephen Rundi Utom	GPS (PBB)
N70	Samalaju	Majang Renggi	GPS (PRS)
N71	Bekenu	Rosey Yunus	GPS (PBB)
N72	Lambir	Ripin Lamat	GPS (PBB)
N73	Piasau	Sebastian Ting Chiew Yew	GPS (SUPP)
N74	Pujut	Vacant	
N75	Senadin	Lee Kim Shin	GPS (SUPP)
N76	Marudi	Penguang Manggil	GPS (PDP)
N77	Telang Usan	Dennis Ngau	GPS (PBB)
N78	Mulu	Gerawat Gala	GPS (PBB)
N79	Bukit Kota	Abdul Rahman Ismail	GPS (PBB)
N80	Batu Danau	Paulus Gumbang	GPS (PBB)
N81	Ba'kelalan	Baru Bian	PSB
N82	Bukit Sari	Awang Tengah Ali Hasan	GPS (PBB)

== Seating plan ==
	N40 Kabong	N36 Layar	N46 Meradong	C	Serjeant-at-Arms	B	N19 Mambong (Assistant Minister)	N47 Pakan	N72 Lambir
	N70 Samalaju	N63 Bukit Goram	N44 Jemoreng	C		B	N27 Sebuyau (Assistant Minister)	N53 Bawang Assan (Opposition Leader)	N35 Saribas
	N50 Machan	N25 Simunjan	N2 Tasik Biru	C		B	N32 Simanggang (Assistant Minister)	N78 Mulu (Deputy Speaker)	N24 Sadong Jaya
	N66 Murum	N06 Tupong	N45 Repok	C		B	N26 Gedong (Assistant Minister)	N73 Piasau (Assistant Minister)	N22 Kedup
Vacant	N43 Daro	N23 Bukit Semuja	N52 Dudong	C		B	N60 Kakus (Assistant Minister)	N42 Semop (Assistant Minister)	N5 Demak Laut	Vacant
Vacant	N58 Balingian	N18 Serembu	N16 Muara Tuang	C		B	N75 Senadin (Minister)	N30 Balai Ringin (Assistant Minister)	N49 Ngemah	Vacant
Vacant	N48 Meluan	N61 Pelagus	N57 Tellian	C		B	N15 Asajaya (Minister)	N76 Marudi (Assistant Minister)	N33 Engkilili	Vacant
Vacant	N59 Tamin	N13 Batu Kitang	N29 Beting Maro	C		B	N67 Jepak (Minister)	N55 Nangka (Assistant Minister)	N80 Batu Danau	Vacant
			N77 Telang Usan	D		A	N69 Kemena (Minister)
Vacant	Vacant	Vacant	Vacant	D		A	N14 Batu Kawah (Minister)	N79 Bukit Kota (Assistant Minister)	N28 Lingga	Vacant
Vacant	Vacant	Vacant	Vacant	D		A	N56 Dalat (Minister)	N34 Batang Ai (Assistant Minister)	N1 Opar	Vacant
Vacant	Vacant	Vacant	N11 Batu Lintang	D		A	N21 Tebedu (Minister)	N07 Samariang (Assistant Minister)	N17 Stakan	Vacant
Vacant	Vacant	N74 Pujut (Vacant)	N10 Pending	D		A	N82 Bukit Sari (Deputy Chief Minister III)	N04 Pantai Damai (Assistant Minister)	N31 Bukit Begunan	Vacant
	Vacant	N51 Bukit Assek	N81 Ba'kelalan	D		A	N64 Baleh (Deputy Chief Minister II)	N20 Tarat (Assistant Minister)	N38 Kalaka
	Vacant	N54 Pelawan	N68 Tanjong Batu	D		A	N37 Bukit Saban (Deputy Chief Minister I)	N41 Kuala Rajang (Assistant Minister)	N62 Katibas
	Vacant	N09 Padungan	N12 Kota Sentosa	D	Table	A	N08 Satok (Chief Minister)	N71 Bekenu (Assistant Minister)	N03 Tanjong Datu
	Vacant	N39 Krian		D	Secretary	A		N65 Belaga (Assistant Minister)	Vacant
					Speaker
					Yang Di-Pertua Negeri
