= Stakan =

State constituency in Sarawak, Malaysia

Stakan (N17)
Sarawak constituency

State constituency
- Legislature: Sarawak State Legislative Assembly
MLA
Vacant
- Constituency created: 2015
- First contested: 2016
- Last contested: 2026

Stakan is a state constituency in Sarawak, Malaysia, that has been represented in the Sarawak State Legislative Assembly since 2016.

The state constituency was created in the 2015 redistribution and is mandated to return a single member to the Sarawak State Legislative Assembly under the first past the post voting system.

== Demographics ==
Ethnic breakdown of Stakan's electorate as of 2022
1. Sarawak bumiputera (43.2%)
2. Malay-Muslim bumiputera (32.0%)
3. Chinese (22.7%)
4. Other ethnicities (2.10%)

== History ==
As of 2020, Stakan has a population of 73,478 people.

=== Polling districts ===
According to the gazette issued on 31 October 2022, the Stakan constituency has a total of 5 polling districts.

State constituency	Polling Districts	Code	Location
Stakan (N17)	Merdang	197/17/01	SK Binyu; Dewan Kpg. Merdang Gayam; SMK Muara Tuang; Balairaya Sg. Empit; SK Merdang; SJK (C) Chung Hua Sg. Jernang
Stakan (N17)	Quop	197/17/02	SK St. James Quop
Stakan (N17)	Sidanu	197/17/03	SMK Penrissen; Dewan Sri Lestari Kpg. Sri Arjuna
Stakan (N17)	Pengkalan Kuap	197/17/04	SK Jalan Muara Tuang
Stakan (N17)	Stakan	197/17/05	SMK Wira Penrissen; Dewan Kpg. Stakan

=== Representation history ===
Members of the Legislative Assembly for Stakan
Assembly	No	Years	Member	Party
Constituency created from Muara Tuang, Demak Laut and Kota Sentosa
18th	N17	2016-2018	Mohamad Ali Mahmud	BN (PBB)
18th	N17	2018-2021	Mohamad Ali Mahmud	GPS (PBB)
19th	N17	2021–2026	Hamzah Brahim	GPS (PBB)

== Election results ==
Sarawak state election, 2026: Stakan
Party	Candidate	Votes	%	∆%
GPS	Hamzah Brahim			▲
PBK	Atet Dego			▲
Total valid votes				
Total rejected ballots				
Unreturned ballots				
Turnout				
Registered electors				
Majority				

Sarawak state election, 2021: Stakan
Party	Candidate	Votes	%	∆%
GPS	Hamzah Brahim	7,854	72.45	▲72.45
PSB	George Young Si Ricord Junior	2,047	18.88	▲18.88
DAP	Leslie Ting Xiang Zhi	524	4.83	▼11.95
PBK	Atet Dego	415	3.83	▲3.83
Total valid votes		10,840	100.00	
Total rejected ballots		182		
Unreturned ballots		43		
Turnout		11,065	65.12	▼7.89
Registered electors		16,992		
Majority		5,807	53.57	▼12.87
GPS gain from BN		Swing		?
Source(s) https://lom.agc.gov.my/ilims/upload/portal/akta/outputp/1718688/PUB687.pdf

Sarawak state election, 2016: Stakan
Party	Candidate	Votes	%
BN	Mohamad Ali Mahmud	8,820	83.22
DAP	Leslie Ting Xiang Zhi	1,778	16.78
Total valid votes		10,598	100.00
Total rejected ballots		186	
Unreturned ballots		55	
Turnout		10,839	73.01
Registered electors		14,846	
Majority		7,042	66.44
This was a new constituency created.
Source(s) "Federal Government Gazette - Notice of Contested Election, State Legislative Assembly of the State of Sarawak [P.U. (B) 190/2016]" (PDF). Attorney General's Chambers of Malaysia. 25 April 2016. "Senarai Calon yang Disahkan Layak Bertanding Pilihan Raya Dewan Undangan Negeri ke-11". Election Commission of Malaysia. 25 April 2016. Archived from the original on 25 April 2016.
