= Bukit Sari =

Bukit Sari (N82)
Sarawak constituency

State constituency
- Legislature: Sarawak State Legislative Assembly
MLA
Vacant
- Constituency created: 2005
- First contested: 2006
- Last contested: 2021

Bukit Sari is a state constituency in Sarawak, Malaysia, that has been represented in the Sarawak State Legislative Assembly since 2006.

The state constituency was created in the 2005 redistribution and is mandated to return a single member to the Sarawak State Legislative Assembly under the first past the post voting system.

== Demographics ==
Ethnic breakdown of Bukit Sari's electorate as of 2022
1. Malay-Muslim bumiputera (71.1%)
2. Sarawak bumiputera (12.8%)
3. Chinese (12.2%)
4. Other ethnicities (3.80%)

== History ==
As of 2020, Bukit Sari has a population of 26,942 people.

=== Polling districts ===
According to the Official Gazette dated 31 October 2022, the Bukit Sari constituency has a total of 22 polling districts.

State constituency	Polling Districts	Code	Location
Bukit Sari (N82)	Sundar	222/82/01	SK Sundar
Bukit Sari (N82)	Bukit Sari	222/82/02	SK Kuala Lawas
Bukit Sari (N82)	Merapok	222/82/03	SK Merapok
Bukit Sari (N82)	Lawas	222/82/04	SJK (C) Chung Hua Lawas
Bukit Sari (N82)	Gelapas	222/82/05	SK Trusan
Bukit Sari (N82)	Awat	222/82/06	SK Awat-Awat Sundar
Bukit Sari (N82)	Baru	222/82/07	SMK Sundar
Bukit Sari (N82)	Luagan	222/82/08	SK Luagan Sundar
Bukit Sari (N82)	Aru	222/82/09	SK Aru Baru Sundar
Bukit Sari (N82)	Pagar	222/82/10	Dewan Masyarakat Sundar
Bukit Sari (N82)	Katong	222/82/11	Dewan Kpg.Tanjong Katong
Bukit Sari (N82)	Pemukat	222/82/12	Dewan Masyarakat Kpg. Pemukat
Bukit Sari (N82)	Dato	222/82/13	SK Kpg. Seberang Kuala Lawas
Bukit Sari (N82)	Belipat	222/82/14	SK Belipat Lawas
Bukit Sari (N82)	Sualai	222/82/15	Dewan Kpg. Sualai; Dewan Masyarakat Kpg. Siang-Siang Laut
Bukit Sari (N82)	Punang	222/82/16	SK Puang Lawas
Bukit Sari (N82)	Sibagol	222/82/17	Dewan Masyarakat Kpg. Ulu Merapok
Bukit Sari (N82)	Melusok	222/82/18	SRA MIS Lawas
Bukit Sari (N82)	Temangis	222/82/19	SK Pusat Lawas
Bukit Sari (N82)	Mission	222/82/20	Dewan Kpg. Baru Mission
Bukit Sari (N82)	Ladang Baru	222/82/21	SK Ladang Baru Lawas
Bukit Sari (N82)	Silat	222/82/22	Dewan Kpg. Berjumpa

=== Representation history ===
Members of the Legislative Assembly for Bukit Sari
Assembly	No	Years	Member	Party
Constituency created from Lawas
16th	N71	2006–2011	Awang Tengah Ali Hasan	BN (PBB)
17th	N71	2011–2016	Awang Tengah Ali Hasan	BN (PBB)
18th	N82	2016–2018	Awang Tengah Ali Hasan	BN (PBB)
18th	N82	2018-2021	Awang Tengah Ali Hasan	GPS (PBB)
19th	N82	2021–2026	Awang Tengah Ali Hasan	GPS (PBB)

== Election results ==
Sarawak state election, 2026: Bukit Sari
Party	Candidate	Votes	%	∆%
GPS				▲
PH				▲
Total valid votes				
Total rejected ballots				
Unreturned ballots				
Turnout				
Registered electors				
Majority				

Sarawak state election, 2021: Bukit Sari
Party	Candidate	Votes	%	∆%
GPS	Awang Tengah Ali Hasan	6,385	87.48	▲87.48
PSB	Alias Mail	749	10.26	▲10.26
PBK	Riyah Basra	165	2.26	▲2.26
Total valid votes		7,299	100.00	
Total rejected ballots		64		
Unreturned ballots		79		
Turnout		7,442	57.01	
Registered electors		13,054		
Majority		5,636	77.22	
GPS gain from BN		Swing		?
Source(s) https://lom.agc.gov.my/ilims/upload/portal/akta/outputp/1718688/PUB687.pdf

Sarawak state election, 2016: Bukit Sari
Party	Candidate	Votes	%	∆%
On the nomination day, Tengah Ali Hassin won uncontested.
BN	Tengah Ali Hassin			
Total valid votes			100.00	
Total rejected ballots				
Unreturned ballots				
Turnout				
Registered electors		12,418		
Majority				
BN hold		Swing		{{{2}}}
Source(s) "Federal Government Gazette - Notice of Contested Election, State Legislative Assembly of the State of Sarawak [P.U. (B) 190/2016]" (PDF). Attorney General's Chambers of Malaysia. 25 April 2016. Archived from the original (PDF) on 12 June 2017. "Senarai Calon yang Disahkan Layak Bertanding Pilihan Raya Dewan Undangan Negeri ke-11". Election Commission of Malaysia. 25 April 2016. Archived from the original on 2016-04-25. "Federal Government Gazette - Notice of Contested Election, State Legislative Assembly of the State of Sarawak Corrigendum [P.U. (B) 192/2016]" (PDF). Attorney General's Chambers of Malaysia. 26 April 2016. Archived from the original (PDF) on 2017-06-12.

Sarawak state election, 2011: Bukit Sari
Party	Candidate	Votes	%	∆%
BN	Tengah Ali Hassin	6,018	86.30	▼6.73
PKR	Japar Suyut	955	13.70	▲12.07
Total valid votes		6,973	100.00	
Total rejected ballots		94		
Unreturned ballots		0		
Turnout		7,067	70.79	▲5.86
Registered electors		9,983		
Majority		5,063	72.60	▼15.09
BN hold		Swing		{{{2}}}
Source(s) "Federal Government Gazette - Results of Contested Election and Statements of the Poll after the Official Addition of Votes Sarawak [P.U. (B) 245/2011]" (PDF). Attorney General's Chambers of Malaysia. 29 April 2011.

Sarawak state election, 2006: Bukit Sari
Party	Candidate	Votes	%
BN	Tengah Ali Hassin	5,596	93.03
Independent	Japar Suyut	321	5.34
PKR	Mohamad Brahim	98	1.63
Total valid votes		6,015	100.00
Total rejected ballots		44	
Unreturned ballots		27	
Turnout		6,086	64.93
Registered electors		9,373	
Majority		5,275	87.69
This was a new constituency created.
