= Awang Tengah Ali Hasan =

Malaysian politician

Yang Berhormat Datuk Amar Awang Tengah Ali Hasan DA PSLJ PNBS PGBK AMN MLA
- اواڠ تڠه علي حسن
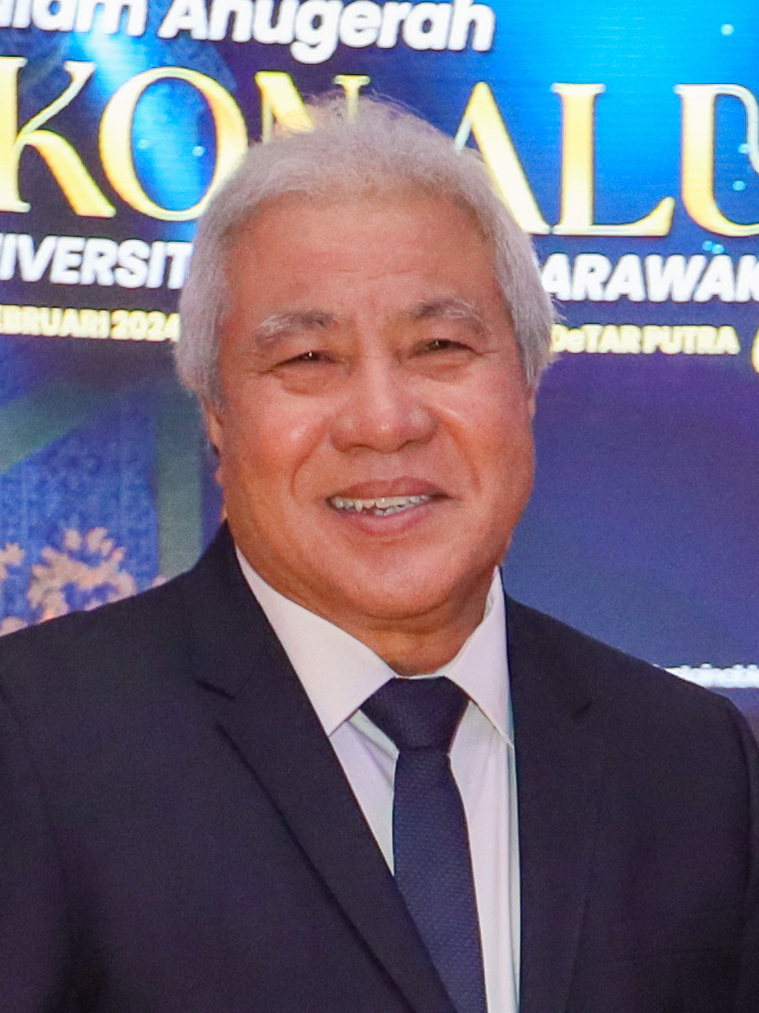
- Awang Tengah in 2024

Deputy Premier of Sarawak
- Incumbent
- Assumed office 6 May 2017 Serving with Douglas Uggah Embas, James Jemut Masing (2017–2021), Sim Kui Hian (since 2022)
- Governor: Abdul Taib Mahmud (2017–2024); Wan Junaidi Tuanku Jaafar (since 2024)
- Chief Minister: Abang Abdul Rahman Johari Abang Openg
- Preceded by: Abang Abdul Rahman Johari Abang Openg
- Constituency: Bukit Sari

Deputy President of Parti Pesaka Bumiputera Bersatu
- Incumbent
- Assumed office 21 January 2017 Serving with Douglas Uggah Embas
- President: Abang Abdul Rahman Johari Abang Openg
- Preceded by: Abang Abdul Rahman Johari Abang Openg

Ministerial roles (Sarawak)
- 2001–2004: Assistant Minister in the Chief Minister’s Department
- 2004–2011: Minister of Planning and Resource Management
- 2006–2016: Minister of Public Utilities
- 2011–2017: Minister of Resource Planning and Environment
- 2016–2017: Minister of Industry, Entrepreneur Development, Trade and Investment
- 2017–: Deputy Chief Minister
- 2017–2021: Minister of Urban Development and Natural Resources
- 2019–2021: Minister of International Trade and Industry, Industrial Terminals and Entrepreneurship
- 2022–: Second Minister for Natural Resources and Urban Development
- 2022–: Minister for International Trade and Investment

Faction represented in Sarawak State Legislative Assembly
- 1987–2018: Barisan Nasional
- 2018–: Gabungan Parti Sarawak

Personal details
- Born: Awang Tengah bin Ali Hasan; 2 December 1963 (age 62) Kampung Dato, Bukit Lawas, Crown Colony of Sarawak (now Sarawak, Malaysia)
- Party: Parti Pesaka Bumiputera Bersatu (PBB) (1987–present)
- Other political affiliations: Barisan Nasional (BN) (1987–2018); Gabungan Parti Sarawak (GPS) (2018–present)
- Spouse: Dayang Morliah Awang Daud
- Occupation: Politician

Awang Tengah bin Ali Hasan (Jawi: اواڠ تڠه علي حسن; born 2 December 1963) is a Malaysian politician who has served as Deputy Premier of Sarawak since May 2017 and Member of Sarawak State Legislative Assembly (MLA) for Bukit Sari since April 1987. He currently also holds the portfolio of Second Minister for Natural Resources and Urban Development and Minister for International Trade and Investment under the administration of Premier Abang Abdul Rahman Johari Abang Openg. Previously, he had also held other cabinet posts under previous premiers Abdul Taib Mahmud and Adenan Satem. Awang Tengah is a member of the Parti Pesaka Bumiputera Bersatu (PBB), a component party of the ruling Gabungan Parti Sarawak (GPS) coalition.

== Career ==
Awang Tengah previously served as chairman of the Board of Management at the Sarawak Timber Industry Development Corporation. He also served as the Director of the Sarawak Timber Industry Development Corporation.

He is currently the Deputy Premier of Sarawak to fill the vacancy after former Deputy Chief Minister Abang Johari Tun Openg has been appointed as the Premier of Sarawak, other portfolios he is currently serving are Minister of International Trade & Industry, Industrial Terminal & Entrepreneur Development Sarawak and Second Minister of Urban Development and Natural Resources.

== Election results ==
Sarawak State Legislative Assembly
Year	Constituency	Candidate	Votes	Pct	Opponent(s)	Votes	Pct	Turnout	Majority	Turnout
1987	N48 Lawas	Awang Tengah Ali Hasan (PBB)								
1991	N56 Lawas	Awang Tengah Ali Hasan (PBB)	6,076	71.41%	Baru Bian (PBDS)	2,433	28.59%	8,619	3,643	74.10%
1996	N61 Lawas	Awang Tengah Ali Hasan (PBB)	Unopposed							
2001	N61 Lawas	Awang Tengah Ali Hasan (PBB)	6,299	95.61%	Japar Suyut (keADILan)	289	4.39%	6,666	6,010	67.18%
2006	N71 Bukit Sari	Awang Tengah Ali Hasan (PBB)	5,596	93.03%	Japar Suyut (IND)	321	5.34%	6,086	5,275	64.93%
2006	N71 Bukit Sari	Awang Tengah Ali Hasan (PBB)	5,596	93.03%	Mohamad Brahim (PKR)	98	1.63%	6,086	5,275	64.93%
2011	N71 Bukit Sari	Awang Tengah Ali Hasan (PBB)	6,018	86.30%	Japar Suyut (keADILan)	955	13.70%	7,067	5,063	70.79%
2016	N82 Bukit Sari	Awang Tengah Ali Hasan (PBB)	Unopposed							
2021	N82 Bukit Sari	Awang Tengah Ali Hasan (PBB)	6,385	87.48%	Alias Mail (PSB)	749	10.26%	7,442	5,636	57.01%
2021	N82 Bukit Sari	Awang Tengah Ali Hasan (PBB)	6,385	87.48%	Riyah Basra (PBK)	165	2.26%	7,442	5,636	57.01%

== Honours ==
- Malaysia
  - Member of the Order of the Defender of the Realm (AMN) (1989)
- Sarawak
  - Knight Commander of the Order of the Star of Hornbill Sarawak (DA) – Datuk Amar (2008)
  - Knight Commander of the Most Exalted Order of the Star of Sarawak (PNBS) – Dato Sri (2006)
  - Commander of the Order of the Star of Hornbill Sarawak (PGBK) – Datuk (1998)
  - Gold Medal of the Sarawak Independence Diamond Jubilee Medal (2023)

=== Foreign honours ===
- Brunei
  - First Class of the Order of Paduka Seri Laila Jasa (PSLJ) – Dato Paduka Seri Laila Jasa (2023)

== See also ==
- Cabinet of Sarawak
