= Douglas Uggah Embas =

Malaysian politician

Yang Berhormat Datuk Amar Douglas Uggah Embas DA PNBS AMN MLA
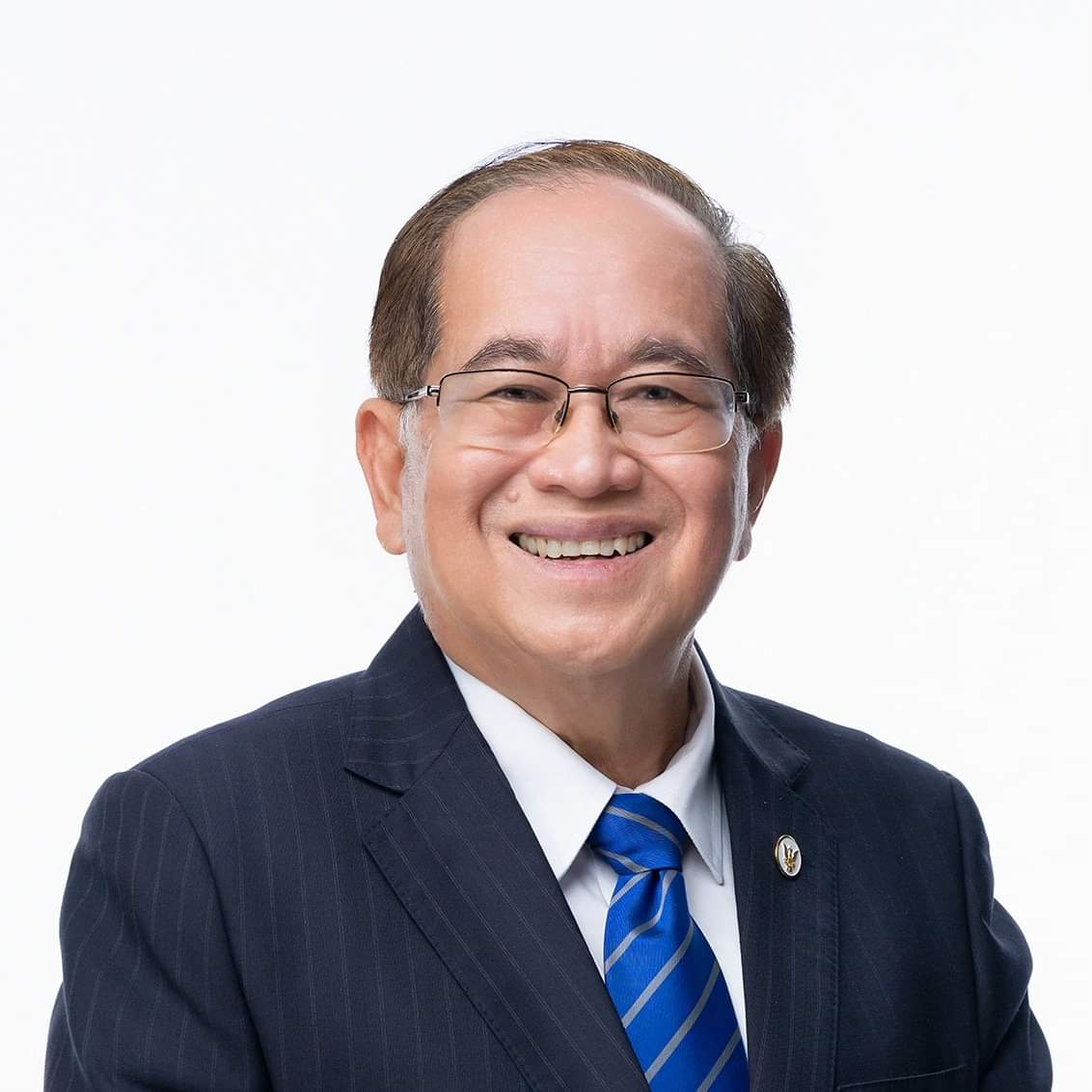
- Douglas in 2022

Deputy Premier of Sarawak
- Incumbent
- Assumed office 13 May 2016 Serving with Abang Abdul Rahman Johari Abang Openg (2016–2017), James Jemut Masing (2016-2021), Awang Tengah Ali Hasan (since 2017), Sim Kui Hian (since 2022)
- Governor: Abdul Taib Mahmud (2016–2024); Wan Junaidi Tuanku Jaafar (since 2024)
- Premier: Adenan Satem (2016–2017); Abang Abdul Rahman Johari Abang Openg (since 2017)
- Preceded by: Alfred Jabu Numpang
- Constituency: Bukit Saban

Deputy President of the Parti Pesaka Bumiputera Bersatu
- Incumbent
- Assumed office 21 January 2017 Serving with Awang Tengah Ali Hasan
- President: Abang Abdul Rahman Johari Abang Openg
- Preceded by: Alfred Jabu Numpang

Ministerial roles (Sarawak)
- 2016–: Deputy Premier
- 2016–2017: Minister of Modernisation of Agriculture and Rural Economy
- 2017–2022: Minister of Modernisation of Agriculture, Native Land and Regional Development
- 2019–2021: Second Minister of Finance
- 2022–: Second Minister for Finance and New Economy
- 2022–: Minister for Infrastructure and Port Development

Ministerial roles (federal)
- 1999–2001: Deputy Minister in the Prime Minister's Department
- 2001–2008: Deputy Minister of Transport
- 2008–2013: Minister of Natural Resources and Environment
- 2013–2016: Minister of Plantation Industries and Commodities

Faction represented in Dewan Rakyat
- 1986–2018: Barisan Nasional

Faction represented in Sarawak State Legislative Assembly
- 2016–2018: Barisan Nasional
- 2018–: Gabungan Parti Sarawak

Personal details
- Born: 28 July 1956 (age 70) Spaoh, Betong, Crown Colony of Sarawak (now Sarawak, Malaysia)
- Party: Parti Pesaka Bumiputera Bersatu (PBB) (since 1977)
- Other political affiliations: Barisan Nasional (BN) (1977–2018); Gabungan Parti Sarawak (GPS) (since 2018)
- Spouse: Doreen Mayang
- Children: 2
- Education: University of Malaya (BEcon)
- Occupation: Politician

Douglas Uggah Embas (born 28 July 1956) is a Malaysian politician who has served as the Deputy Premier of Sarawak (Note: Formerly known as Deputy Chief Minister.) since 2016. He has been the Member of the Sarawak State Legislative Assembly (MLA) for Bukit Saban since 2016, and previously served as the Member of Parliament (MP) for Betong from 1986 to 2018. He is currently part of the state cabinet under Premier Abang Johari, holding the positions of Second Minister for Finance and New Economy, as well as Minister for Infrastructure and Port Development. He previously served as Minister of Agriculture Modernisation and Rural Economy under former Chief Minister Adenan Satem.

Douglas is a member of Parti Pesaka Bumiputera Bersatu (PBB), a component party of the ruling Gabungan Parti Sarawak (GPS) coalition. During his time as MP for Betong, Douglas served in the federal cabinet under three prime ministers: Mahathir Mohamad, Abdullah Ahmad Badawi, and Najib Razak. His roles included Deputy Minister in the Prime Minister's Department, Deputy Minister of Transport, Minister of Natural Resources and Environment, and finally, Minister of Plantation Industries and Commodities, a position he held until his appointment as Deputy Premier in 2016.

== Early life and education ==
Douglas Uggah Embas was born in Spaoh, Betong, Sarawak, and graduated with an Honours degree in economics from Universiti Malaya in 1976. From 1977 to 1986, he served as political secretary to the Chief Ministers of Sarawak, Abdul Rahman Ya'kub and Abdul Taib Mahmud.

== Political career ==
In 1986 Malaysian general election, Douglas Uggah contested and won the Betong parliamentary seat. He was appointed Parliamentary Secretary to the Prime Minister's Department in 1990 and later transferred to the Rural Development Ministry in the same capacity in 1995. In 1999 Malaysian general election, he was promoted to Deputy Minister in the Prime Minister's Department. A senior member of Parti Pesaka Bumiputera Bersatu (PBB), he also served on the party's Supreme Council.

== Election results ==
Parliament of Malaysia
Year	Constituency	Candidate	Votes	Pct	Opponent(s)	Votes	Pct	Ballots cast	Majority	Turnout
1986	P163 Betong, Sarawak	Douglas Uggah Embas (PBB)	8,052	65.65%	Wilfred Gomez Azarias Malong (IND)	2,433	19.84%	12,514	5,619	61.46%
1986	P163 Betong, Sarawak	Douglas Uggah Embas (PBB)	8,052	65.65%	George Dennis Ningkan (IND)	1,780	14.51%	12,514	5,619	61.46%
1990	P165 Betong, Sarawak	Douglas Uggah Embas (PBB)	9,178	75.29%	Musa Jamaluddin (PERMAS)	2,005	16.45%	12,345	7,173	69.75%
1990	P165 Betong, Sarawak	Douglas Uggah Embas (PBB)	9,178	75.29%	David Impi (IND)	1,007	8.26%	12,345	7,173	69.75%
1995	P177 Betong, Sarawak	Douglas Uggah Embas (PBB)	Unopposed							
1999	P178 Betong, Sarawak	Douglas Uggah Embas (PBB)	Unopposed							
2004	P204 Betong, Sarawak	Douglas Uggah Embas (PBB)	11,618	85.98%	Abang Zulkifli Abang Engkeh (SNAP)	1,895	14.02%	13,689	9,723	66.01%
2008	P204 Betong, Sarawak	Douglas Uggah Embas (PBB)	13,708	87.27%	Edmund Stanley Jugol (SNAP)	1,999	12.73%	15,953	11,709	72.22%
2013	P204 Betong, Sarawak	Douglas Uggah Embas (PBB)	15,476	77.13%	Cecilia Siti Una (PKR)	4,589	22.87%	20,439	10,887	77.65%

Sarawak State Legislative Assembly
Year	Constituency	Candidate	Votes	Pct	Opponent(s)	Votes	Pct	Ballots cast	Majority	Turnout
2016	N37 Bukit Saban	Douglas Uggah Embas (PBB)	5,524	85.66%	Noel Changgai Bucking (PKR)	925	14.34%	6,584	4,599	74.00%
2021	N37 Bukit Saban	Douglas Uggah Embas (PBB)	5,373	77.94%	Andria Gelayan Dundang (PSB)	1,385	20.09%	7,002	3,988	73.53%
2021	N37 Bukit Saban	Douglas Uggah Embas (PBB)	5,373	77.94%	Mikail Mathew Abdullah (PKR)	136	1.97%	7,002	3,988	73.53%

== Honours ==
- Malaysia
  - Member of the Order of the Defender of the Realm (AMN) (1989)
- Sarawak
  - Knight Commander of the Order of the Star of Hornbill Sarawak (DA) – Datuk Amar (2013)
  - Knight Commander of the Order of the Star of Sarawak (PNBS) – Dato Sri (2009)
  - Commander of the Order of the Star of Hornbill Sarawak (PGBK) – Datuk (1998)
  - Officer of the Order of the Star of Sarawak (PBS) (1985)
  - Member of the Order of the Star of Sarawak (ABS) (1984)
  - Gold Medal of the Sarawak Independence Diamond Jubilee Medal (2023)
