= Bukit Saban (state constituency) =

State constituency in Sarawak, Malaysia

Bukit Saban (N37)
Sarawak constituency

State constituency
- Legislature: Sarawak State Legislative Assembly
MLA
Vacant
- Constituency created: 2005
- First contested: 2006
- Last contested: 2026

Bukit Saban is a state constituency in Sarawak, Malaysia, that has been represented in the Sarawak State Legislative Assembly since 2006.

The state constituency was created in the 2005 redistribution and is mandated to return a single member to the Sarawak State Legislative Assembly under the first past the post voting system.

== Demographics ==
Ethnic breakdown of Bukit Saban's electorate as of 2022
1. Sarawak bumiputera (64.5%)
2. Malay-Muslim bumiputera (30.8%)
3. Chinese (4.50%)
4. Other ethnicities (0.20%)

== History ==
As of 2020, Bukit Saban has a population of 10,464 people.

=== Polling districts ===
According to the gazette issued on 31 October 2022, the Bukit Saban constituency has a total of 35 polling districts.

State constituency	Polling Districts	Code	Location
Bukit Saban（N37）	Penunus	204/37/01	RH Pau Penunus
Bukit Saban（N37）	Rimbas	204/37/02	RH Benjamin, Ulu Rimbas
Bukit Saban（N37）	Spaoh	204/37/03	SJK (C) Chung Hua Spaoh
Bukit Saban（N37）	Suri	204/37/04	SK Suri
Bukit Saban（N37）	Bukit Saban	204/37/05	RH Kelvin Bundak Tanjong Baru; RH James Jugol Belabak
Bukit Saban（N37）	Kubal	204/37/06	RH Janggat Sg. Langit
Bukit Saban（N37）	Brutan	204/37/07	RH Lawrence Luban Ulu
Bukit Saban（N37）	Bayor	204/37/08	RH Jimmy Ulu Bayor
Bukit Saban（N37）	Ulu Teru	204/37/09	RH Ganya Ulu Teru
Bukit Saban（N37）	Metong	204/37/10	RN Denil Menyalin Baru
Bukit Saban（N37）	Delit	204/37/11	SK Ng. Gayau
Bukit Saban（N37）	Babu	204/37/12	RH Danggat Babu Tengah; RH Lidi Busuk Babu Ulu
Bukit Saban（N37）	Traie	204/37/13	RH Basil Melaka Traie
Bukit Saban（N37）	Rapong	204/37/14	RH Bawir Rapong
Bukit Saban（N37）	Tot	204/37/15	RH Rayong Ng. Lop
Bukit Saban（N37）	Spaoh Hulu	204/37/16	SMK Spaoh
Bukit Saban（N37）	Spaoh Hilir	204/37/17	SK Spaoh
Bukit Saban（N37）	Belabak	204/37/18	RH Judin Udau
Bukit Saban（N37）	Lingit	204/37/19	RH Evelyn Inja Lempaong
Bukit Saban（N37）	Penom	204/37/20	RH Mendit Penom
Bukit Saban（N37）	Meroh	204/37/21	RH Jame Lubok Klampu
Bukit Saban（N37）	Sepuna	204/37/22	RH Luta Empaga Ng Bong
Bukit Saban（N37）	Samu	204/37/23	RH Enterie Samu
Bukit Saban（N37）	Mutok	204/37/24	RH Masing Mutok
Bukit Saban（N37）	Penebak	204/37/25	SK St. John Ng. Tuga
Bukit Saban（N37）	Bair	204/37/26	RH Banyang Bair
Bukit Saban（N37）	Jambu	204/37/27	RH Joseph Sanda
Bukit Saban（N37）	Tiput	204/37/28	RH Kedit Raba Tiput
Bukit Saban（N37）	Pelikoi	204/37/29	RH Thomas Pelikoi
Bukit Saban（N37）	Jaloh	204/37/30	RH Kechendai Jaloh
Bukit Saban（N37）	Serudit	204/37/31	RH Reselie Ujie Serudit
Bukit Saban（N37）	Matop	204/37/32	RH Anyi Matop
Bukit Saban（N37）	Teberu	204/37/33	SK Paku Central
Bukit Saban（N37）	Rembai	204/37/34	RH Nyanggau Chong Bangkit Rembai Baru
Bukit Saban（N37）	Bangkit	204/37/35	RH Munan Ng Bangkit

=== Representation history ===
Members of the Legislative Assembly for Bukit Saban
Assembly	No	Years	Member	Party
Constituency created from Krian, Saribas and Layar
16th	N32	2006-2011	Robert Lawson Chuat Vincent Entering	BN (PBB)
17th	N32	2011-2016	Robert Lawson Chuat Vincent Entering	BN (PBB)
18th	N37	2016-2018	Douglas Uggah Embas	BN (PBB)
18th	N37	2018-2021	Douglas Uggah Embas	GPS (PBB)
19th	N37	2021–2026	Douglas Uggah Embas	GPS (PBB)

== Election results ==
Sarawak state election, 2026
Party	Candidate	Votes	%	∆%
GPS				▲
PH				▲
Total valid votes				
Total rejected ballots				
Unreturned ballots				
Turnout				
Registered electors				
Majority				

Sarawak state election, 2021
Party	Candidate	Votes	%	∆%
GPS	Douglas Uggah Embas	5,373	77.94	▲77.94
PSB	Andria Dundang @ Andria Gelayan	1,385	20.09	▲20.09
PKR	Mikhael Matthew Abdullah @ Nyawai Patrick Agus	136	1.97	▼12.37
Total valid votes		6,894	100.00	
Total rejected ballots		79		
Unreturned ballots		29		
Turnout		7,002	73.53	▼0.47
Registered electors		9,523		
Majority		3,988	57.85	▼13.47
GPS gain from BN		Swing		?
Source(s) https://lom.agc.gov.my/ilims/upload/portal/akta/outputp/1718688/PUB687.pdf

Sarawak state election, 2016
Party	Candidate	Votes	%	∆%
BN	Douglas Uggah Embas	5,524	85.66	▲16.83
PKR	Noel Changgai Bucking	925	14.34	▼5.52
Total valid votes		6,449	100.00	
Total rejected ballots		108		
Unreturned ballots		27		
Turnout		6,584	74.00	▼1.24
Registered electors		8,897		
Majority		4,599	71.32	▲22.35
BN hold		Swing		
Source(s) "Federal Government Gazette - Notice of Contested Election, State Legislative Assembly of the State of Sarawak [P.U. (B) 190/2016]" (PDF). Attorney General's Chambers of Malaysia. 25 April 2016. Archived from the original (PDF) on 12 June 2017. "Senarai Calon yang Disahkan Layak Bertanding Pilihan Raya Dewan Undangan Negeri ke-11". Election Commission of Malaysia. 25 April 2016. Archived from the original on 2016-04-25.

Sarawak state election, 2011
Party	Candidate	Votes	%	∆%
BN	Robert Lawson Chuat Vincent Entering	3,899	68.83	▼0.82
PKR	Jerah Engkiong @ Edward Jerah	1,125	19.86	▲19.86
SNAP	Dayrell Walter Entrie	641	11.32	▼19.03
Total valid votes		5,665	100.00	
Total rejected ballots		78		
Unreturned ballots		18		
Turnout		5,761	75.24	▲6.00
Registered electors		7,657		
Majority		2,774	48.97	▲9.67
BN hold		Swing		
Source(s) "Federal Government Gazette - Results of Contested Election and Statements of the Poll after the Official Addition of Votes Sarawak [P.U. (B) 245/2011]" (PDF). Attorney General's Chambers of Malaysia. 29 April 2011.

Sarawak state election, 2006
Party	Candidate	Votes	%
BN	Robert Lawson Chuat Vincent Entering	3,258	69.65
SNAP	Edwin Dundang Bugak	1,420	30.35
Total valid votes		4,678	100.00
Total rejected ballots		71	
Unreturned ballots		12	
Turnout		4,761	69.24
Registered electors		6,876	
Majority		1,838	39.30
This was a new constituency created.
