= Dalat =

Dalat may refer to:

- Da Lat (Vietnamese: Đà Lạt), capital of Lâm Đồng Province, Vietnam
- Dalat, Myanmar, or Dalet, a town in Rakhine State, Myanmar (Burma)
- Dalat Banner, or Dalad Banner, county of Inner Mongolia, China
- Dalat, Sarawak, the administrative town of Dalat District, Malaysia
- Dalat District, an administrative district of Mukah in Sarawak, Malaysia
- Dalat (state constituency), represented in the Sarawak State Legislative Assembly
