= Kampung Medong, Sarawak =

- Village
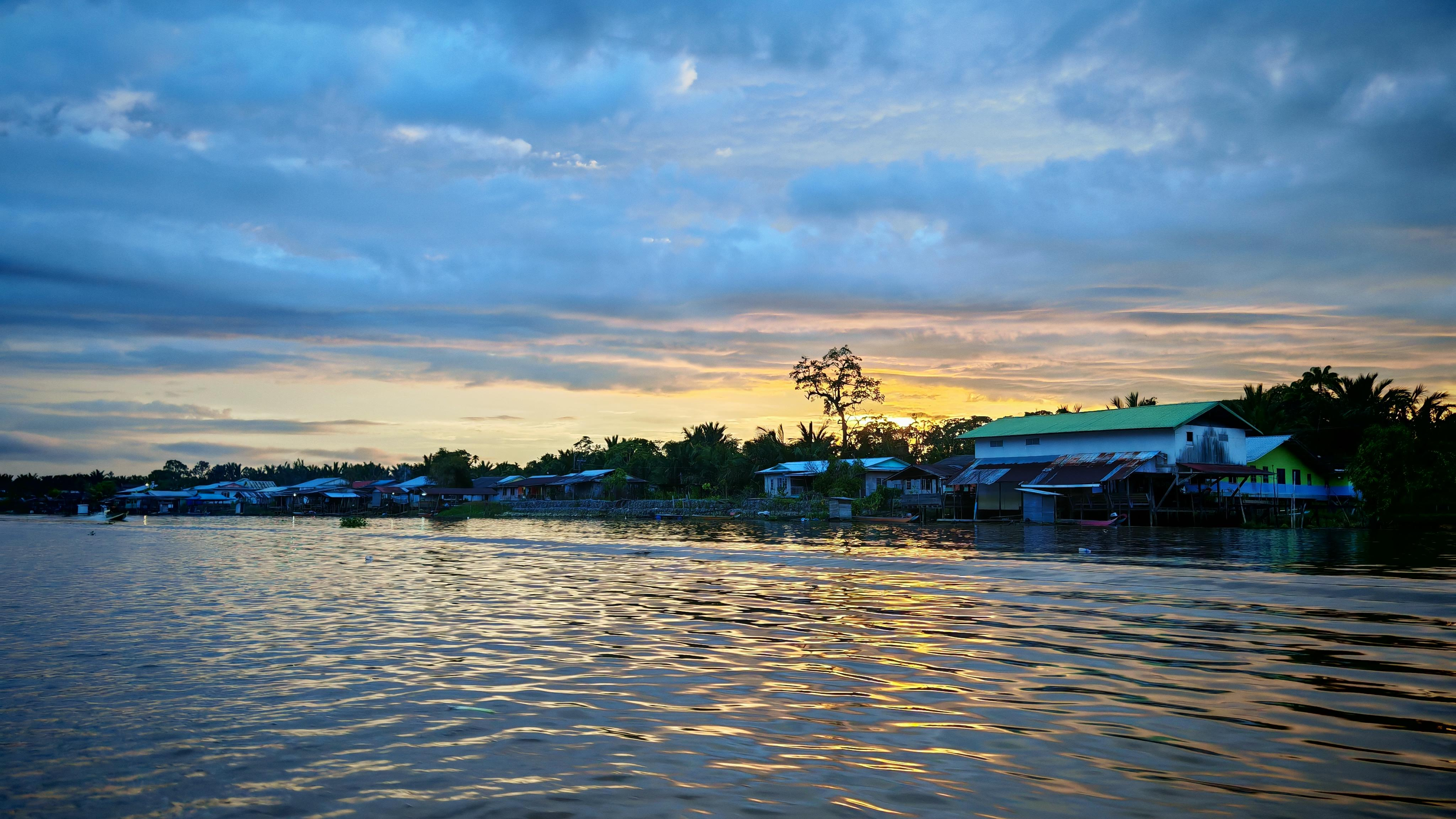
- Kampung Medong seen from the Oya River.

- Location in East Malaysia Location in Malaysia
- Coordinates: 2°41′07″N 111°56′04″E
- Country: Malaysia
- State: Sarawak
- Division: Mukah
- District: Dalat

Population (2018)
  - Total: 2,346
- Time zone: UTC+8 (MST)
- Postcode: 96300

Kampung Medong is a village located within Dalat District in Mukah Division, Sarawak. The village is located about 6.1 kilometres (3.8 miles) to the south of Dalat town.

== History ==
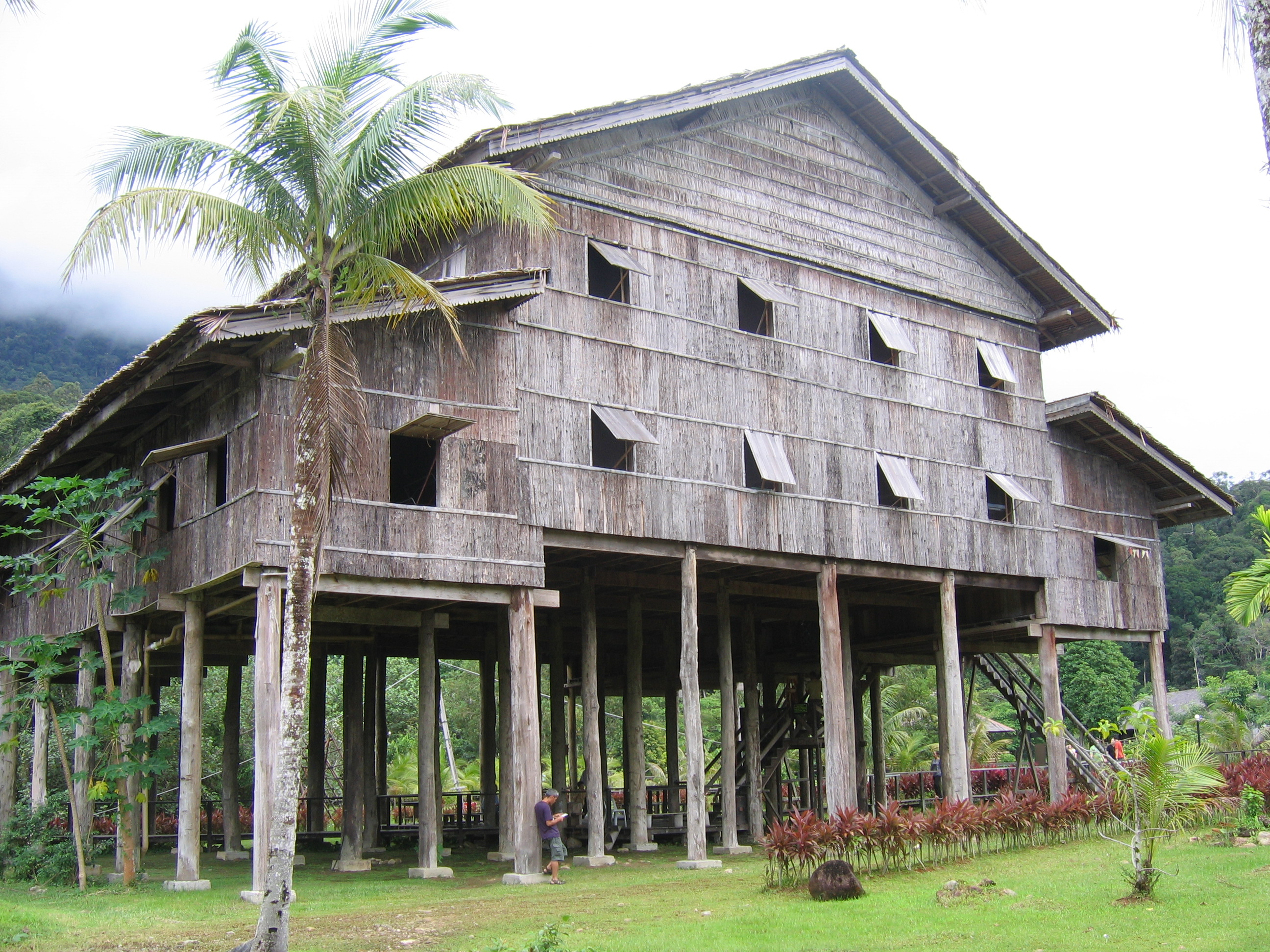
Melanau tall house replica in Sarawak Cultural Village, Kuching

According to Dr. Jeniri Amir, a Melanau Historical and Culture researcher as well as author of the book, Masyarakat Melanau di Sarawak, Kampung Medong has existed since the days when the Melanaus used to live in tall longhouses. There were three tall longhouses in Kampung Medong, namely Lebok Sekayau, Lebok Dagen and another unknown. The tradition of longhouses began to be replaced by separate houses - similar to that of Malay villages - at the end of the 19th century following the villagers' conversion to Islam or Christianity and the Sultan of Brunei’s decision in surrendering the Rajang River until Tanjung Kidurong area to Rajah James Brooke in 1861 as threats and attacks from the enemy had lessened. The last tall longhouse in Kampung Medong as well as the last on Oya River was abandoned in 1942 during the Japanese invasion. The frame of Lebok Dagen existed until 1950, while one of the belian poles is still standing to date.

== Sub-division and population ==
Kampung Medong is officially divided into three sub-villages namely, Kampung Medong Hilir, Kampung Medong Hulu and Kampung Medong Seberang. In 2018, the total population of the village is 2,346 people. Majority of the villagers are Melanau.

== Facilities ==
Kampung Medong is equipped with basic infrastructure such as a health clinic, a community internet centre, a mosque - Masjid Al-Hidayah, a Catholic chapel - Chapel St. Peter, a national-type primary school - SK St John, and a firefighting volunteers’ team (Malay: Pasukan Bomba Sukarela - PBS) center.

== Economic activities ==
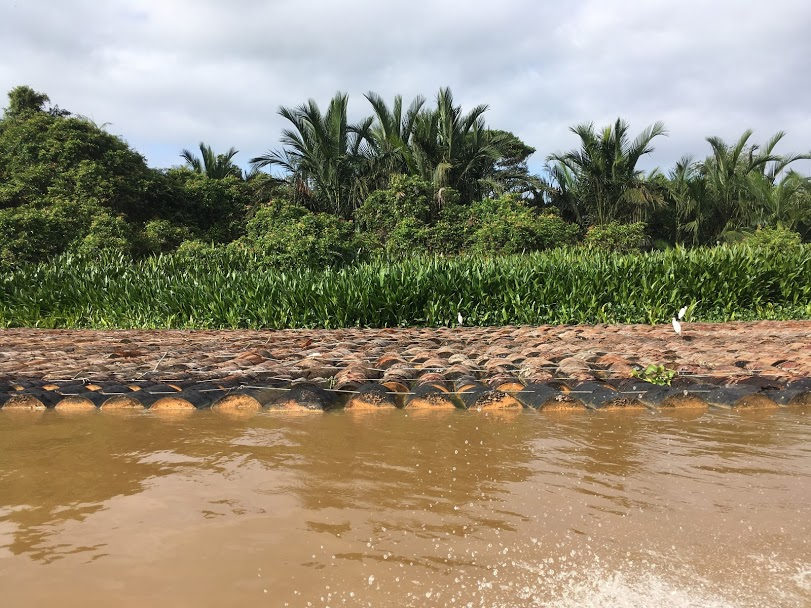
Sago logs ready for processing in Kampung Medong.

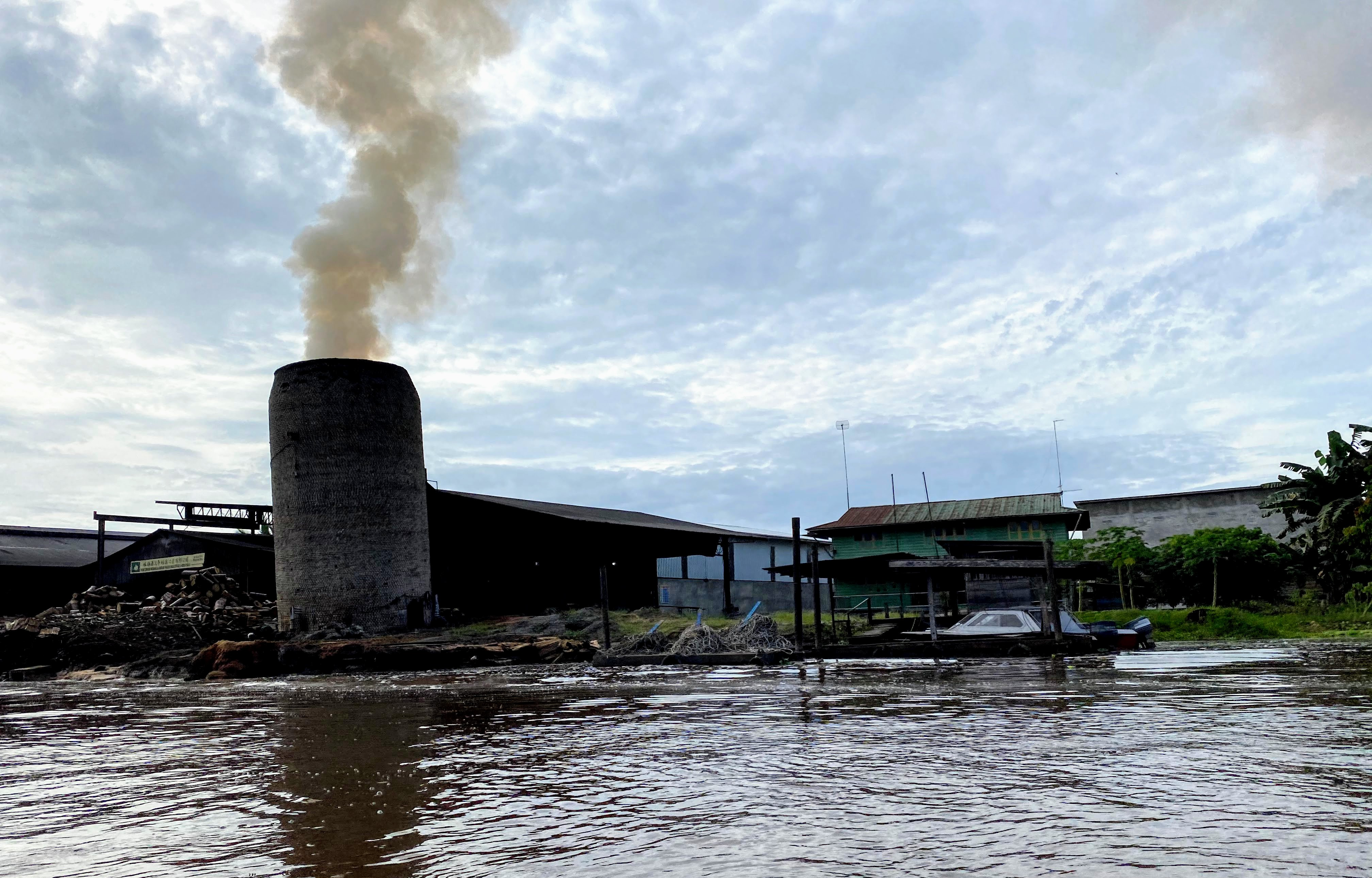
Nee Seng Ngeng & Sons Sago Industries Sdn. Bhd., a sago processing factory located in Kampung Medong.

Main economic activity of the village revolves around sago farming, processing of sago flour and sago-based food products. One of four sago processing factories in Dalat district is located in Kampung Medong, Nge Seng Ngeng Enterprise with a processing capacity of 1,500 logs per day. Famed "sago Medong" (sago pearl) are processed by women in sago cottage industry.
