= Dalat, Sarawak =

Dalat Pekan Dalat
- Town and district capital
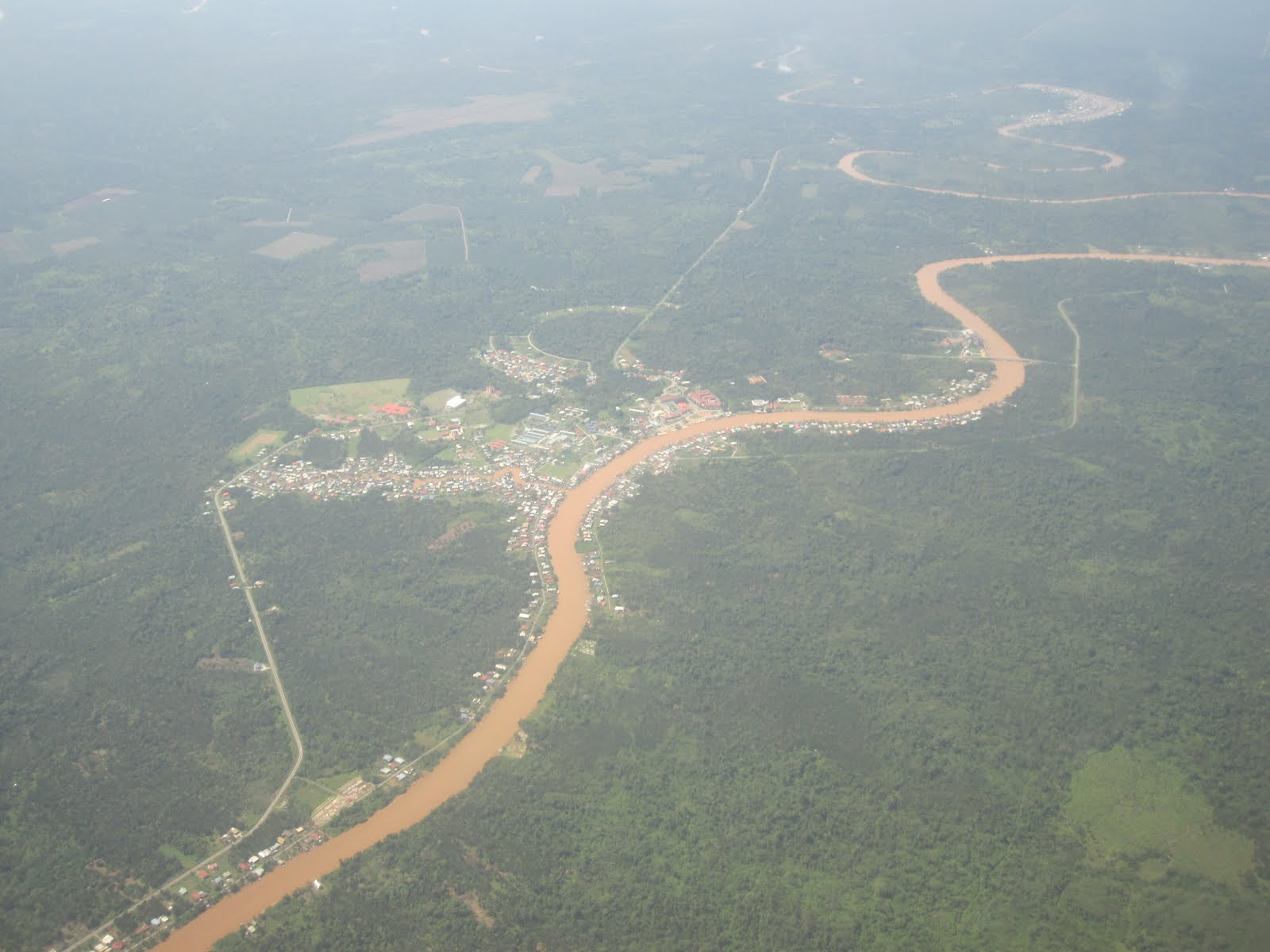
- Aerial view of Dalat town. The river seen here is the Oya river.

- Seal Districts of Sarawak
- Motto: Berakar Rumbia, Berinti Budaya
- Location of Dalat in Malaysian Borneo
- Coordinates: 2°44′20″N 111°56′19″E
- Country: Malaysia
- State: Sarawak
- Division: Mukah
- District: Dalat
- District Office location: Dalat
- Local area government: Majlis Daerah Dalat dan Mukah (MDDM)

Population (2010)
  - Total: 619
- District Officer: Mathew Hubert
- Postcode: 96300
- Website: mukah.sarawak.gov.my/web/home/index/

Dalat is the administrative town of the Dalat district in Mukah Division, Sarawak, Malaysia. It is situated by the Oya River.

== Etymology ==
According to Heidi Munan's book "How Dalat Got Its Name", Dalat was named following a bloodshed among three brothers as the village chief did not name a successor. Many people died in the war. Corpses lying in the village attracted flies. "Dalat" means "fly" in the Melanau language, and therefore, the locals named the village Dalat, which is now a small town.

== Government ==
Dalat is represented at the State Legislative Assembly by Dato' Sri Hajah Fatimah Abdullah from Gabungan Parti Sarawak. She won the seat in the 19th State Election 2021 for the fifth time. For Parliament, Dalat district is under Parliament 213: Mukah.

== Geography ==
Similar to most areas in the Rajang Delta, Dalat town and its land district is located on peat land that is categorized as deep peat (more than 150 cm).

== Climate ==
Dalat has a tropical rainforest climate (Af) with heavy to very heavy rainfall year-round.

Climate data for Dalat
Month	Jan	Feb	Mar	Apr	May	Jun	Jul	Aug	Sep	Oct	Nov	Dec	Year
Mean daily maximum °C (°F)	30.1 (86.2)	30.3 (86.5)	31.2 (88.2)	31.9 (89.4)	32.4 (90.3)	32.2 (90.0)	32.0 (89.6)	31.6 (88.9)	31.6 (88.9)	31.4 (88.5)	31.2 (88.2)	30.7 (87.3)	31.4 (88.5)
Daily mean °C (°F)	26.2 (79.2)	26.6 (79.9)	27.0 (80.6)	27.2 (81.0)	27.8 (82.0)	27.5 (81.5)	27.2 (81.0)	27.0 (80.6)	27.0 (80.6)	27.0 (80.6)	26.9 (80.4)	26.5 (79.7)	27.0 (80.6)
Mean daily minimum °C (°F)	22.4 (72.3)	22.5 (72.5)	22.8 (73.0)	22.9 (73.2)	23.2 (73.8)	22.8 (73.0)	22.4 (72.3)	22.4 (72.3)	22.5 (72.5)	22.6 (72.7)	22.6 (72.7)	22.4 (72.3)	22.6 (72.7)
Average rainfall mm (inches)	520 (20.5)	367 (14.4)	302 (11.9)	199 (7.8)	176 (6.9)	191 (7.5)	167 (6.6)	219 (8.6)	229 (9.0)	261 (10.3)	297 (11.7)	446 (17.6)	3,374 (132.8)
Source: Climate-Data.org

== Demographics ==
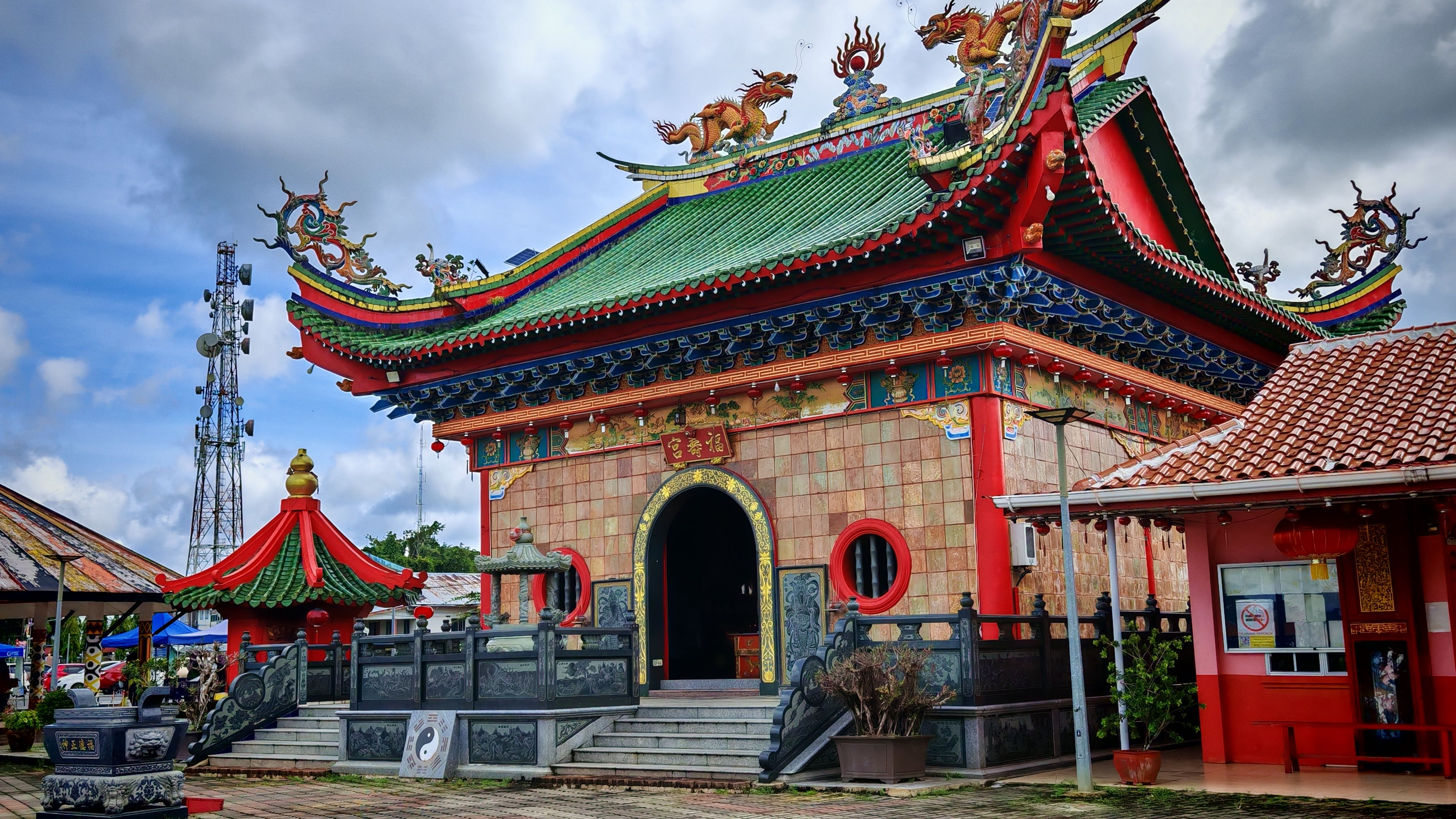
The temple dedicated to deity Tua Pek Kong located at the waterfront.

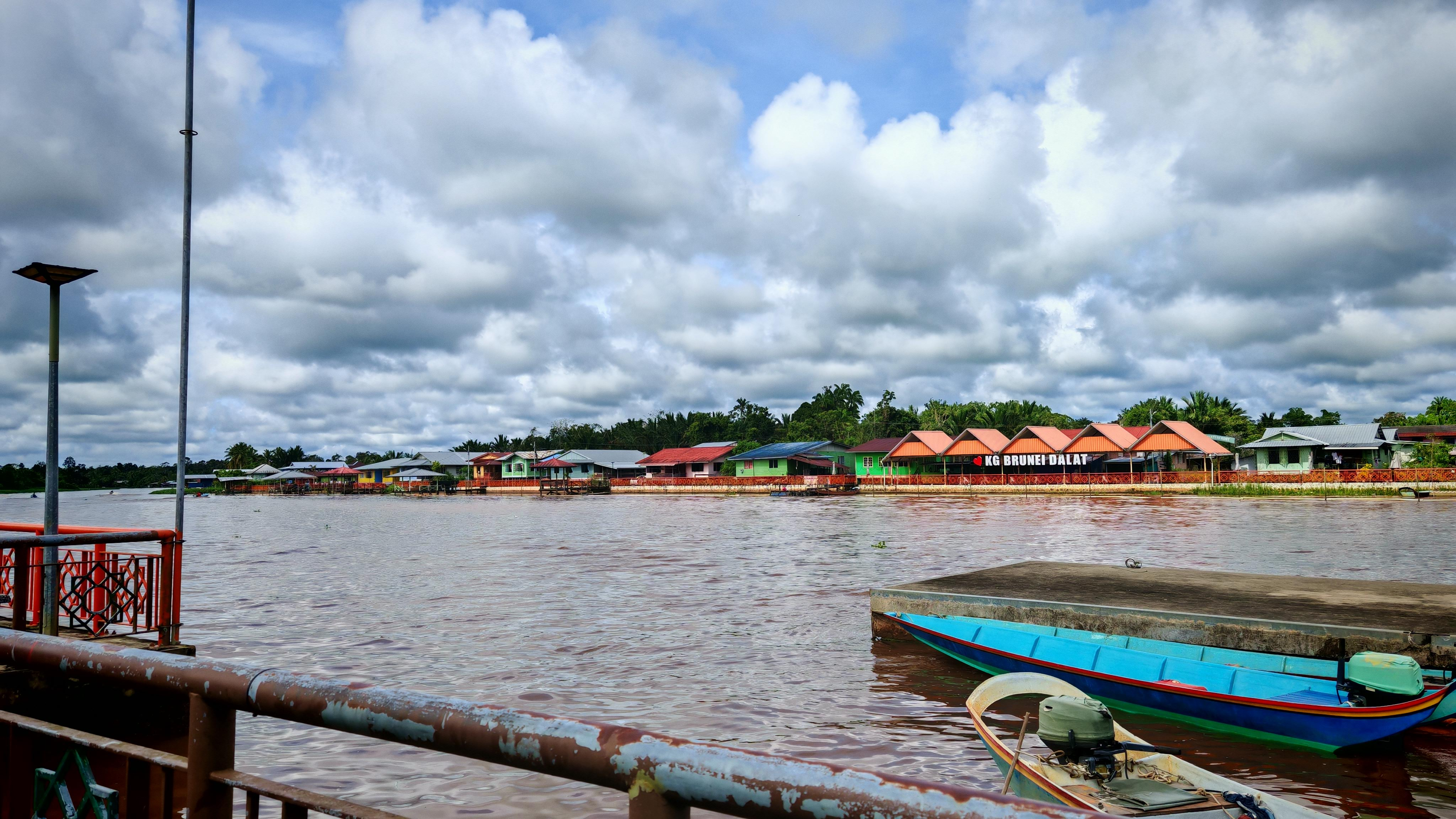
Kg. Brunei, this is how a typical Melanau village looks like in Dalat.

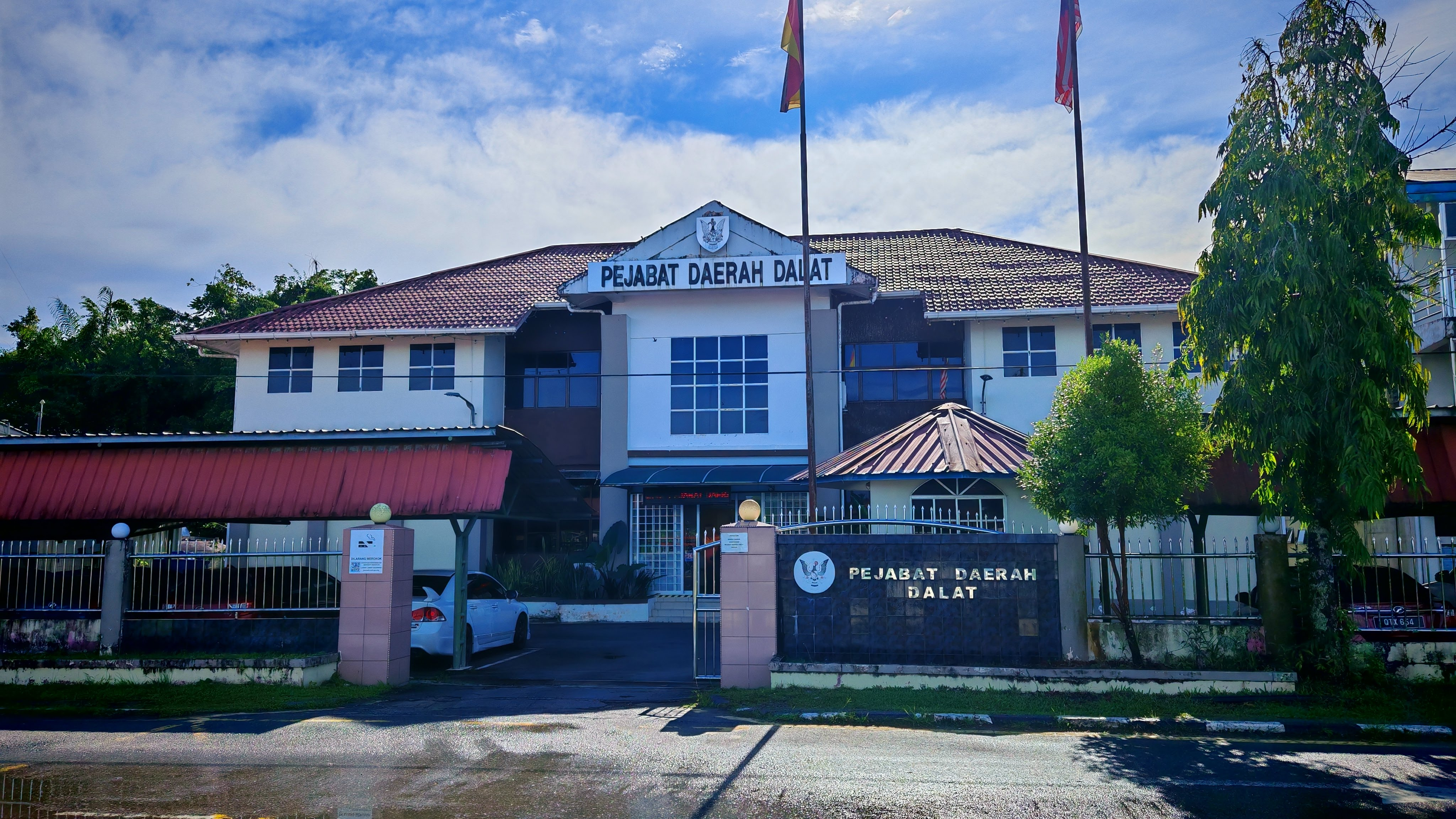
Dalat District Office building.

According to the 2010 National Census, Dalat townland has a population of 619.

Population of Dalat by ethnic group
ethnic group	percent
Melanau	50.89%
Chinese	29.72%
Malay	7.75%
Iban	4.68%
Other Bumiputera and others	6.96%

Most of the people use Melanau language to communicate here. There is a slight difference of the language between each villages, yet they can understand each other very well. Other languages such as Malay, Sarawak Malay, Iban, Mandarin, Hokkien and English are also widely spoken.

Main religions practised in Dalat are Islam, Christianity (Roman Catholic, Methodist and SIB), Buddhism, and Malaysian Chinese religion.

== Economy ==
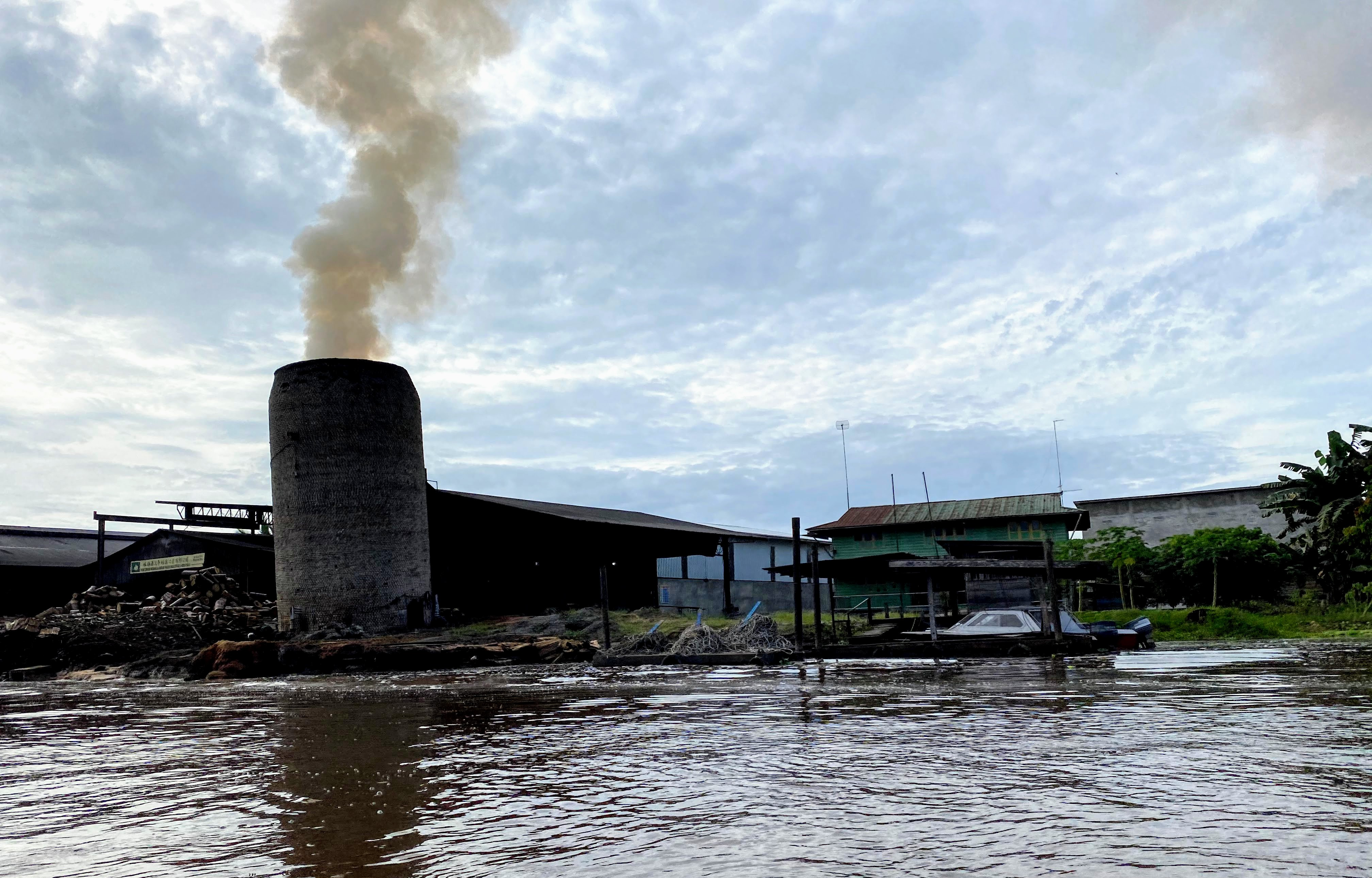
A sago processing plant in Dalat.

Dalat is reputed to be the largest sago flour producer in the world. The district has four modern sago factories with a total output of more than 74 tonnes per day.

The importance of the sago palm tree is evident in the district tagline.

== Transport ==
=== Road ===
Dalat is connected by a single-carriage road to Mukah. There are daily express bus services connecting Dalat and Miri via Bintulu and Mukah. In around 2010, a bridge named Jambatan Temenggong Mat Win was built at Oya River to connect Sungai Kut road and Kampung Kekan Road. This bridge help the local from Kampung Sungai Kut Muara, Kampung Kekan and Kampung Baru to reach Pekan Dalat easier and a lot more fuel and time saving.

=== Air ===
The nearest airport is Mukah Airport. The locals however prefer to use either Bintulu Airport or Sibu Airport to fly to Kuala Lumpur particularly.

=== Water ===
River transportation is still very vital in Dalat. There are speed boats connecting Dalat and Sibu with a fee of MYR 35. The journey takes approximately 2 hours.

=== Transport ===
==== Express Bus ====
Operating Route	Operator
Bintulu-Mukah,Dalat	Eva Express

==== Stage Bus ====
Operating Route	Destination	Operator
MD1	Mukah-Mukah Polytechnic-UiTM Mukah-Oya-Dalat	City Public Link (CPL)

== Other utilities ==
=== Education ===
Dalat town has four secondary schools namely SMK Dalat, SMK Oya, SMK Batang Igan and SMK Agama Igan. In the town proper, there are nine primary schools namely SJK (C) Chin Hua, SK Saint Bernard, SK Kampung Sungai Ud, SK Kampung Tanam, SK Kampung Medong, SK Kampung Sg Kut Tengah, SK Saint Kevin, SJK (C) Poi Yuk, SK Kampung Kebuaw.

In November 2025, Centre Of Technical Excellence Sarawak (CENTEXS) Dalat Campus was officially opened by Premier of Sarawak, Abang Johari. The campus was built with a cost of RM40 million and has become the first training centre in the state to combine elderly care and palliative care under a single, structured programme.

=== Healthcare ===
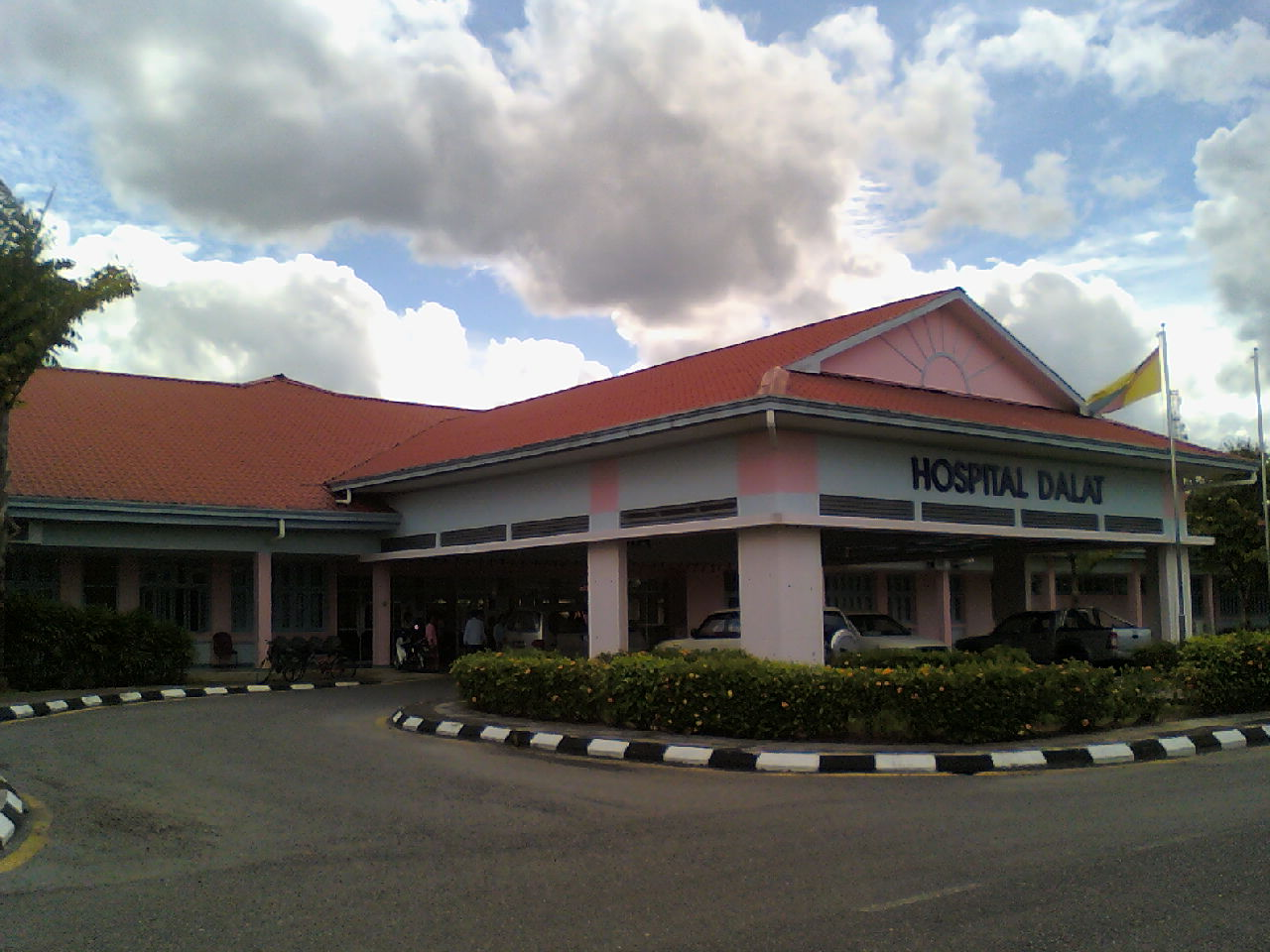
Hospital Dalat Phase 1

The town is served by an eight-bedded public hospital, Dalat Hospital. Despite having the fewest beds among 22 public hospitals in Sarawak, it is equipped with facilities such as X-ray laboratory and a dialysis centre.

Since there is a good system of transportation, any needs which Dalat Hospital could not handle would be referred to Mukah Hospital or even Sibu Hospital.

=== Others ===
Dalat town also has a post office, district office, a hospital, a stadium (Stadium Perpaduan Dalat), a few blocks of shop-houses, a Catholic church (St. Bernard Church), a Methodist Church, a Chinese temple (age more than a century), a district mosque and a Senior Citizens’ Activity Centre (PAWE). In June 2017, a voluntary fire station was launched. The fire station is an interim measure to respond swiftly to fires as the nearest facility is in Mukah, some 40 minutes’ drive away. In December 2020, 'Bazaarnita Fatima' and Phase 2 of Dalat Waterfront were officially opened by the Chief Minister of Sarawak, Datuk Patinggi Abang Abdul Rahman Johari bin Al-Marhum Tun Abang Haji Openg.

There is only one bank in Dalat which is a branch of RHB Bank.

== Culture and leisure ==
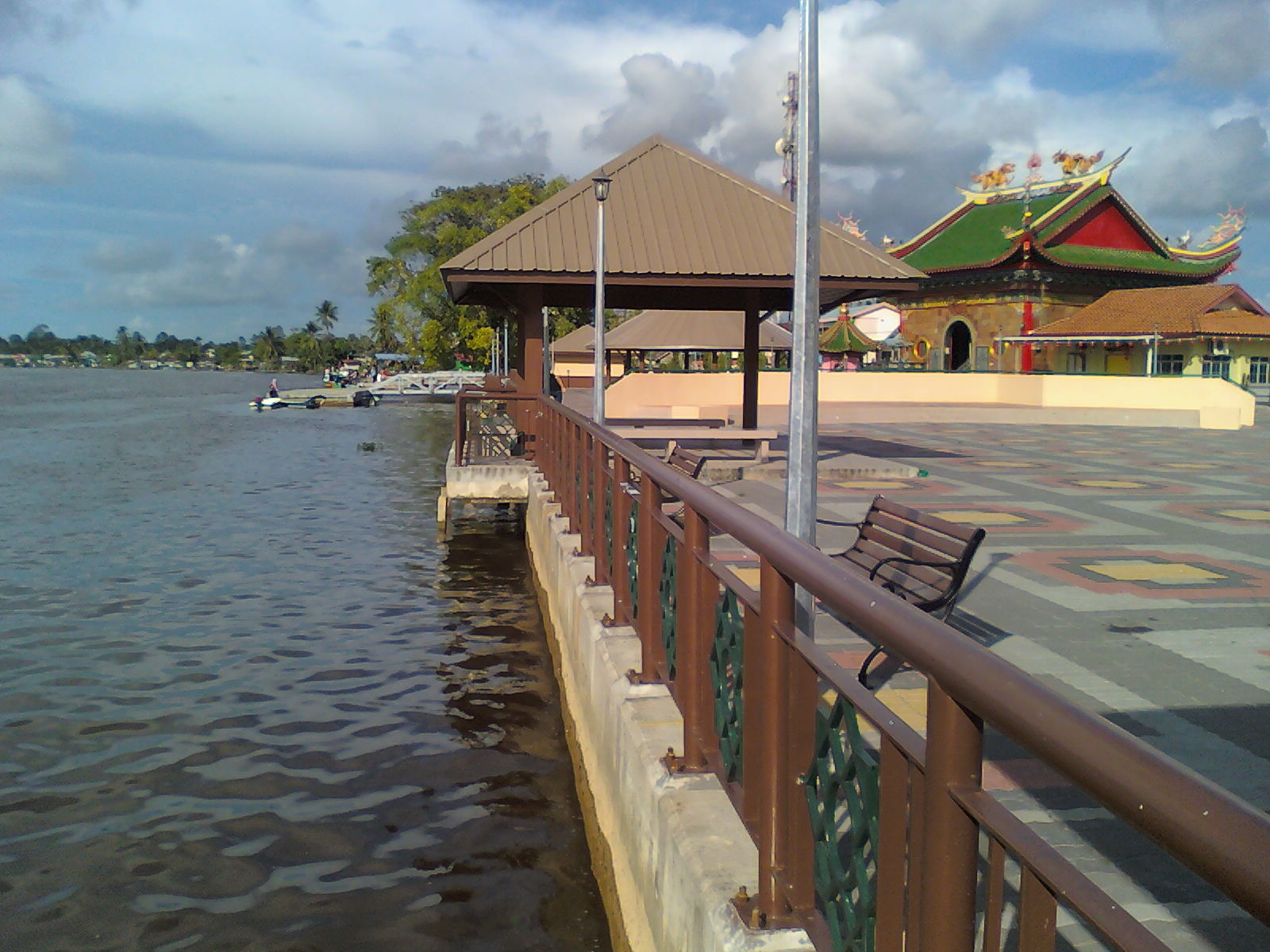
The waterfront by the Oya river as seen in December 2010

The Melanaus are famous for their traditional food such as umai, sago worms and the sago pearls. The importance of sago palm to Melanau culture is celebrated biennially since 2005 in a festival called Karnival Balau Dalat(Balau Dalat Carnival). The festival was included in the 2020 Sarawak tourism calendar. Since 2008, Dalat Regatta (known locally Pesta Besaug Dalat) is held alternately with the Balau Dalat Carnival.

Other major celebrations are Christmas, Hari Raya Aidilfitri, Chinese New Year and Kaul Festival. Kaul Festival is a Melanau annual "cleansing" when traditionally, uninvited spirits and other bad influences were escorted out of the village by a flotilla of boats, and ceremonial offerings of food, cigarettes and betel nut were set on the seraheng (decorated pole). Each village celebrates the festival on different dates prior to the festival in Mukah — touted as the ‘Mother of All Kaul Festivals’ in third week of April.

=== Associations/ Clubs ===
- The Dalat Melanau Association was registered on 9 September 2010 under Association Act 1966–33 with Registrar Of Societies Number PPM-002-13-09092010. The association aims to encourage Melanau at Dalat district to be more proactive and while helping to promote progress for local Melanau people. The club also aims to protect Melanau Dalat heritage and culture.
- Dalat Photography Club - Co-founded by well known freelance photographer Naising Bega who is famous for his artwork. Naising also acts as one of the instructors in this club. The club was registered on 6 November 2012 with ROS PPM014-13-06112012. The club initially known as Melanau Dalat Photography Club which made it early present on Pesta Bersaug Dalat in October 2010. It later renamed to Dalat Photography Club to encourage more people enter the club. The Patron of the club is Dalat state assembly woman Datuk Hajah Fatimah Abdullah @ Ting Sai Ming.

=== Literature ===
- Heidi Munan's short story 'How Dalat Got Its Name' is published in the book Melanau stories (2005) Utusan Publications. The short story was included in the Malaysian lower secondary school English literature curriculum from 2000 to 2009.
- The Kut Canal and Medong Village are also featured in the book Melanau stories (2005), in 'The Story of Kut Canal'.

== Notable people ==
- Fatimah Abdullah - State Assembly Representative of Dalat and the current Minister of Women, Early Childhood and Community Wellbeing Development (Sarawak). She was born and raised in Kampung Teh, Dalat.
- Albert Bansa - documentary filmmaker, and the FreedomFilmFest (FFF) 2019 grant winner for the film "Pengidup Aku" (My Life).
- Fazilla Sylvester Silin - former national field hockey and indoor hockey player. She was born in Kampung Medong, Dalat.
- Rozie Khan - fashion designer and founder of "Rozie Khan Couture". She is the winner of Best Designer award at the 2018 Borneo Fashion Week.
