= Khamaungtaw =

- Location in Burma
- Coordinates: 19°56′N 93°48′E
- Country: Burma
- Division: Rakhine State
- District: Kyaukpyu
- Township: Ann Township
- Time zone: UTC+6:30 (MST)

Khamaungtaw is a village in Ann Township, Kyaukpyu District, in northern Rakhine State in the westernmost part of Burma (Myanmar). It is northwest of Ann on the Ann - Minbya highway. Khamaungtaw is southeast of Dalet.
