= Dalet (disambiguation) =

Dalet is the fourth letter of many Semitic alphabets.

Dalet may also refer to:

- Dalet, Burma a town in Rakhine State of Burma (Myanmar)
- Masada: Dalet, a 1995 album by American composer and saxophonist John Zorn
- Dalet, a neighborhood of Beersheba, Israel
- Dalet School, a private school in Bethel Pennsylvania operated by the Assemblies of Yahweh

== See also ==
- Company Dalet, a unit in the Israeli military prison, Prison Four
- Plan Dalet, a plan worked out by the Haganah, a Jewish paramilitary group and the forerunner of the Israel Defense Forces, in Palestine in autumn 1947 to spring 1948
- Dalit, or the designation as "untouchable" in the Hindu caste system
- Dalek, a type of alien from Doctor Who
