= Mukah (disambiguation) =

Mukah is a town in Malaysia.

Mukah may refer also to:

- Mukah Division, an administrative division of Malaysia
  - Mukah District, a district within the division
- Mukah (federal constituency), represented in the Dewan Rakyat
