= Dalat District =

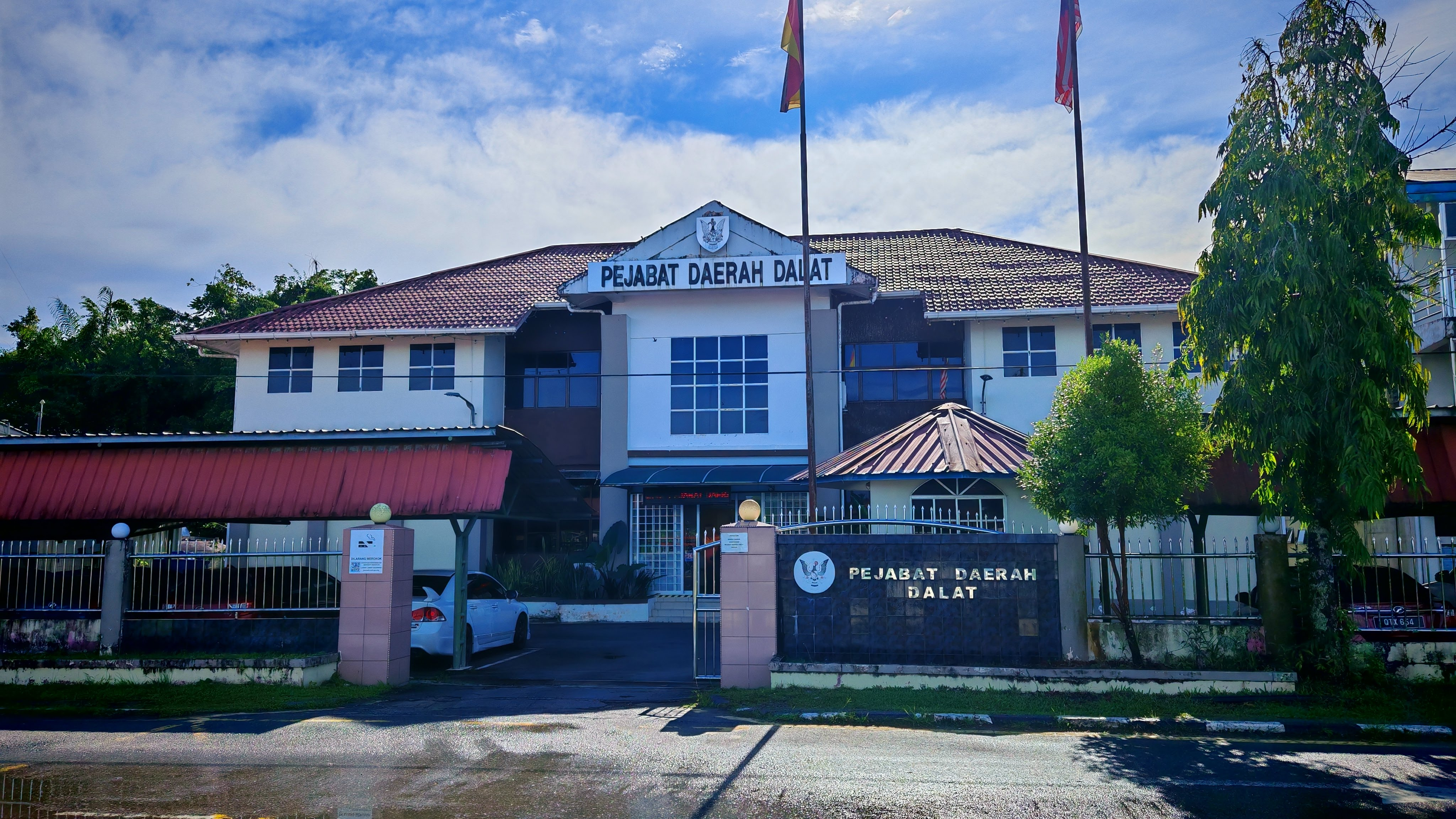
- Dalat District Office building as seen in 2025.

- Districts of Sarawak
- Motto: Berakar Rumbia, Berinti Budaya
- Location of Dalat in Malaysian Borneo
- Coordinates: 2°44′20″N 111°56′19″E
- Country: Malaysia
- State: Sarawak
- Division: Mukah Division
- District Office location: Dalat
- Local area government: Majlis Daerah Dalat dan Mukah (MDDM)

Area
  - Total: 905.29 km^{2} (349.53 sq mi)

Population (2020)
  - Total: 21,147(census)
  - Density: 23.359/km^{2} (60.500/sq mi)
- District Officer: Mathew Hubert
- Sub-district: Oya
- Pekans: Dalat, Oya & Sungai Kut
- Postcode: 96300

Map of Dalat District

The Dalat District is located in Mukah Division, Sarawak, Malaysia. It is situated by the Oya river. The district covers areas from Kg. Penat to Oya, and from Muara Sg. Kut to Ulu Baoh. The district has an area of 905.29 km^{2}, while the Oya sub-district has an area of 147.47 km^{2}.

== History ==
Brief history of the district.

- 2 April 1974 - Dalat was announced as a district, with Dalat town as the administrative centre. The district was under the Sibu Division and covers Oya, Dalat Proper, Nanga Baoh, Nanga Tamin, Stapang, Skim Sekuau and Nanga Pakoh. The district has 4 small towns, 23 villages and 115 longhouses.
- 1 March 2002 - Mukah was elevated to Mukah Division and Dalat district area was "revised" to area that covers Kg. Penat to Oya, and from Muara Sg. Kut to Ulu Baoh. There are 3 small towns, 23 villages and 22 longhouses in the district.

== Demographics ==
According to the 2020 population census by Department of Statistics Malaysia, Dalat has a population of 21,147.

Ethnicities of Dalat
ethnic group	percent
Melanau	59.40%
Iban	33.09%
Chinese	4.73%
Other Bumiputera and others	0.07%

== Economy ==
Main agricultural produce of the district is sago flour. 28,765 ha of agricultural land is used for sago plantation. 4 sago flour factories in the district are capable of producing 75 tonnes of sago flour per day.

== Languages ==
Most of the people use the Melanau language to communicate here. There is a slight difference of the language between each villages, yet they can understand each other very well. Other languages such as Malay, Sarawak Malay, Iban, Mandarin, Hokkien and English are also widely spoken.

== Politics ==
Dalat is represented at the State Legislative Assembly by Datuk Hajah Fatimah Abdullah @ Ting Sai Ming, from Parti Pesaka Bumiputera Bersatu. She won the seat in the 18th State Election 2016 for the fourth time. For Parliament, Dalat is under Parliament 213: Mukah.

== Education ==
There are two secondary schools in the district namely SMK Dalat (established in 1977) and SMK Oya (established in 2004). There are 25 primary schools which falls under the district jurisdiction.
