= Daro District =

Daro
- District
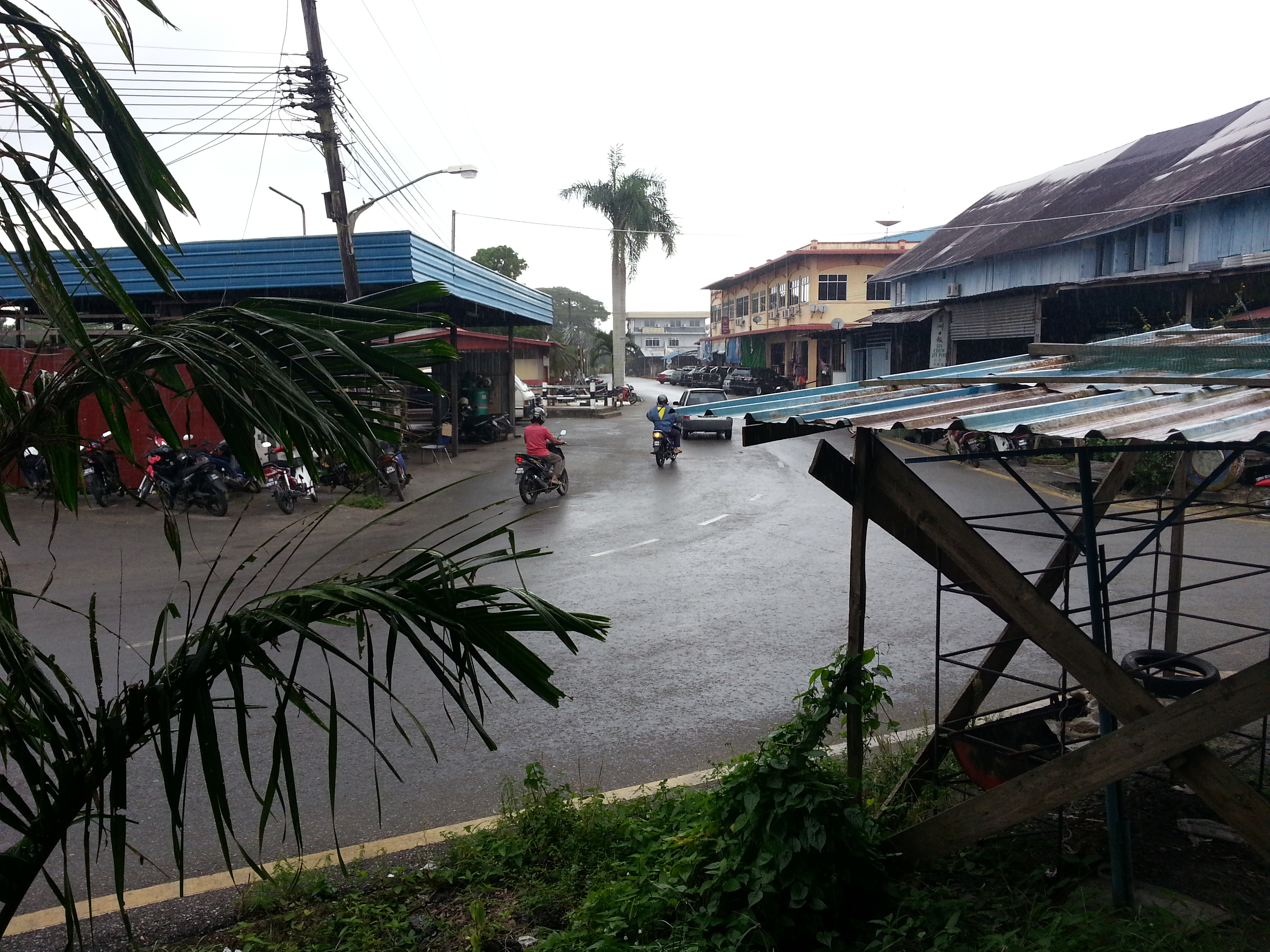
- Daro town as seen in February 2025.

- Seal

- Location within Borneo
- Coordinates: 2°31′0″N 111°26′0″E
- Country: Malaysia
- State: Sarawak
- Division: Mukah
- Seat: Daro

Area
  - Total: 1,226 km^{2} (473 sq mi)

Population (2024)
  - Total: 26,427
  - Density: 21.56/km^{2} (55.83/sq mi)
- Website: matu-darodc.sarawak.gov.my

The Daro District is a district in Mukah Division, Sarawak, Malaysia. The district contains the eponymous town of Daro. The nearest town to Daro is Matu. Daro is administered under the Majlis Daerah Matu-Daro (Matu-Daro District Council), which is also the local authority for Matu District. The population in Daro was 26,427 in 2024, with Malay and Melanau making up the majority. There were ferries from Sibu to here, taking around two hours by using the channel of Rejang River.

== Education ==
=== Secondary school ===
- SMK Toh Puan Datuk Patinggi Hajjah Normah, Daro
- SMK Matu
- SMK Belawai
- SMK SEMOP

=== Primary schools ===
- SJK (C) Chung Hua
- SK Campuran
- SK Hijrah Badong
- SK Nangar
- SK Ulu Daro
- SK Pangtray
- SK Semop

== Demographics ==
Ethnic composition of Daro District (2024)
Ethnicities / Nationality	Percentage
Malays	47.79%
Iban	12.18%
Bidayuh	0.34%
Melanau	36.91%
Other Bumiputeras	0.32%
Chinese	1.74%
Indians	0%
Others	0%
Non-Malaysian	0.72%

Ethnicity	2024	
Ethnicity	Pop.	%
Malays	12630	47.79%
Iban	3218	12.18%
Bidayuh	90	0.34%
Melanau	9754	36.91%
Other Bumiputeras	85	0.32%
Chinese	461	1.74%
Indians	0	0%
Others	0	0%
Malaysian total	26238	99.28%
Non-Malaysian	189	0.72%
Total	26427	100.00%

Historical population
Year	Pop.	±%
1995	9,135	—
2004	12,604	+38.0%
2010	17,923	+42.2%
2015	19,861	+10.8%
2024	26,427	+33.1%

Total population of every areas in Daro, Sarawak. These population are exactly based on their ethnics in Sarawak.

Malay and Melanau are majority ethnics that lived in Daro. These population is fairly higher due to its location which is located at nearby Muara Lassa River (Batang Muara Lassa).

Because of this location, many development projects and infrastructures must have implemented comprehensively. All of these new development projects also spurs regional economic development and improving people's living standards in Daro.

== List of attractions ==
- Masjid Al Muhsinin, Daro
- Masjid Tunku Abdul Rahman, Daro
- Medan Selera Daro
- Stadium Mini Daro
- Batang Lassa Bridge (Jambatan Muara Lassa)
- Daro New Township (Bandar Baru Daro) (under planning, to be built in 2025)

== Climate ==
Daro has a tropical rainforest climate (Af) with heavy to very heavy rainfall year-round.

Climate data for Daro
Month	Jan	Feb	Mar	Apr	May	Jun	Jul	Aug	Sep	Oct	Nov	Dec	Year
Mean daily maximum °C (°F)	30.1 (86.2)	30.3 (86.5)	31.3 (88.3)	32.1 (89.8)	32.6 (90.7)	32.3 (90.1)	32.2 (90.0)	31.9 (89.4)	31.8 (89.2)	31.5 (88.7)	31.4 (88.5)	30.7 (87.3)	31.5 (88.7)
Daily mean °C (°F)	26.2 (79.2)	26.3 (79.3)	27.0 (80.6)	27.4 (81.3)	27.9 (82.2)	27.5 (81.5)	27.3 (81.1)	27.1 (80.8)	27.2 (81.0)	27.0 (80.6)	27.0 (80.6)	26.5 (79.7)	27.0 (80.7)
Mean daily minimum °C (°F)	22.4 (72.3)	22.4 (72.3)	22.8 (73.0)	22.8 (73.0)	23.2 (73.8)	22.8 (73.0)	22.4 (72.3)	22.4 (72.3)	22.6 (72.7)	22.6 (72.7)	22.6 (72.7)	22.4 (72.3)	22.6 (72.7)
Average rainfall mm (inches)	432 (17.0)	252 (9.9)	215 (8.5)	179 (7.0)	165 (6.5)	204 (8.0)	164 (6.5)	162 (6.4)	153 (6.0)	244 (9.6)	288 (11.3)	360 (14.2)	2,818 (110.9)
Source: Climate-Data.org
