= Sago =

Starch extracted from tropical palm stems

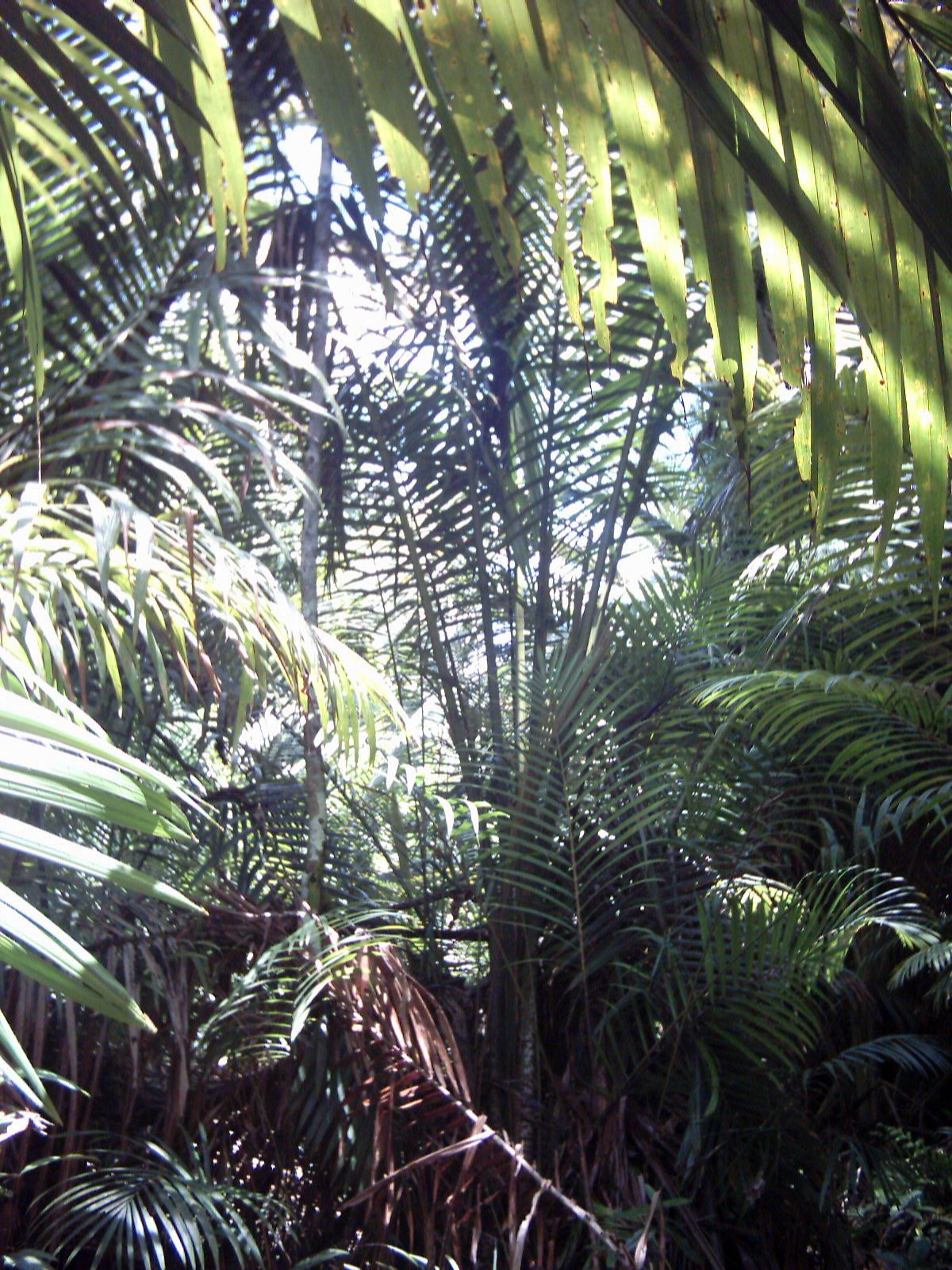
Sago palms (Metroxylon sagu) in New Guinea

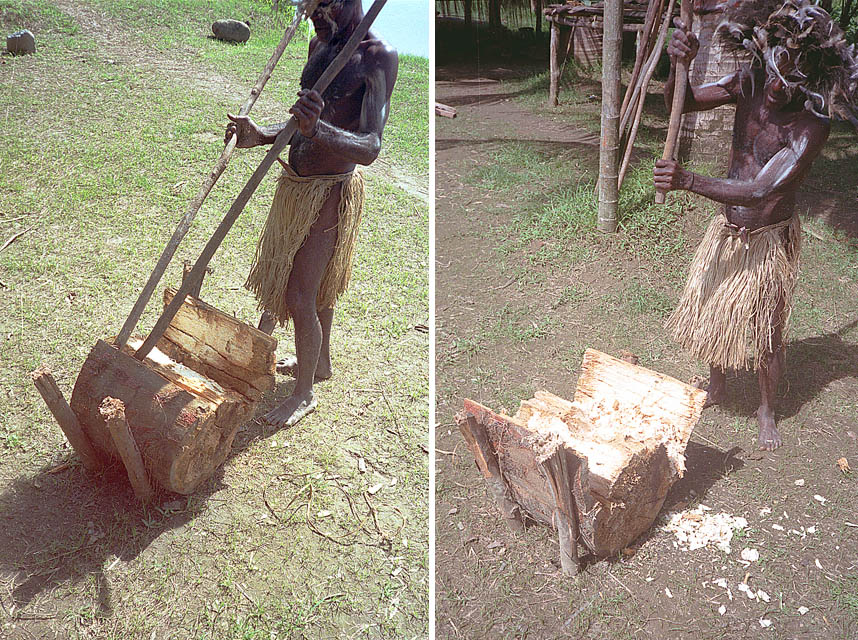
Peeling and pounding a segment of sago palm stem to produce an edible starch. Sepik River, Papua New Guinea

Sago (/ˈseɪɡoʊ/ or /sɐ'go/) is a starch extracted from the soft, spongy core tissue of several tropical palm species, especially Metroxylon sagu. For centuries, it has been an important traditional staple food among many indigenous communities across the islands of Southeast Asia and the Melanesian region, including Malaysia, Indonesia, and Papua New Guinea. In different regions, sago is also known by local names such as saksak (Papua New Guinea), rabia (Maluku Islands), and sagu (Indonesia and Malaysia).

In Malaysia, sago is especially associated with the indigenous communities of Sarawak and Sabah, particularly the Melanau people. The Melanau community has a long historical connection with sago cultivation, processing, and consumption, making it one of the most culturally important foods in their society. The town of Mukah is one of the largest sago-producing regions in Malaysia, with vast areas of swampy land naturally suited for the growth of sago palms. Other areas in Sarawak such as Dalat, Matu, and Oya are also well known for sago production.

Traditionally, the trunk of the sago palm is harvested before the tree fully matures because the starch reserves inside the trunk are richest at that stage. The trunk is split open, and the soft pith inside is crushed and washed repeatedly with water to extract the starch. After settling and drying, the starch becomes sago flour, which can then be used in many traditional dishes. A single mature sago palm can produce hundreds of kilograms of starch, making it an efficient and reliable food source for local communities for generations.

Among the Melanau people, sago flour is commonly known as "lemantak". A famous traditional food made from it is linut, a thick sticky paste created by pouring hot water into sago flour and stirring it until it becomes glue-like in texture. Linut is usually eaten with side dishes such as fish, seafood, jungle vegetables, and sambal. With a texture unusual to outsiders, it remains an important cultural and traditional food among the Melanau community.

Another traditional sago food is sago pearls or sago balls, which are small rounded starch balls often eaten as snacks or served together with traditional dishes such as umai and grilled fish. The process of producing these sago balls is considered time-consuming and traditionally involves several stages of drying, rolling, and processing by hand. Many communities still preserve these traditional methods as part of their cultural heritage.

Commercially, sago is also processed into small starch pearls commonly used in desserts, puddings, sweet soups, and beverages. Real sago pearls are usually off-white in color, irregular in shape, brittle when dry, and cook very quickly. Because tapioca pearls made from cassava starch are cheaper to produce, they are sometimes sold as "sago" in international markets, even though true sago and tapioca come from different plants.

Outside Malaysia, sago is also widely consumed in parts of Eastern Indonesia and Papua New Guinea, where it remains a major staple food for many lowland communities. In places such as the Maluku Islands and Papua New Guinea, sago is commonly prepared as papeda, a thick sticky paste similar to linut, usually eaten with fish-based dishes and soups. The Melanesian region remains one of the world's largest producers of sago, and large quantities are exported internationally for cooking and food production purposes.

== Historical records ==
Sago was noted by the Chinese historian Zhao Rukuo (1170–1231) during the Song dynasty. In his Zhu Fan Zhi (1225), a collection of descriptions of foreign countries, he writes that the kingdom of Boni "produces no wheat, but hemp and rice, and they use sha-hu (sago) for grain".

The Melanau community is historically recorded as being closely associated with sago. They were actively involved in the production of sago and in the cultivation of the rumbia palm (sago palm) in Sarawak. In historical accounts, the Melanau are noted for producing a traditional food in small round forms, about the size of a peanut, known as sago or bulu. It is recorded that during the Japanese occupation in the early 1940s, sago became an important staple food for both the Malay and Melanau communities in Sarawak. Mukah is recorded as the main area for rumbia palm cultivation in Sarawak. From this plant, sago flour, known locally as lemantak, was produced. Historical records also note that sago was available in other areas such as Matu Daro, Dalat, and Oya.

== Sources, extraction and preparation ==
=== Palm sago ===
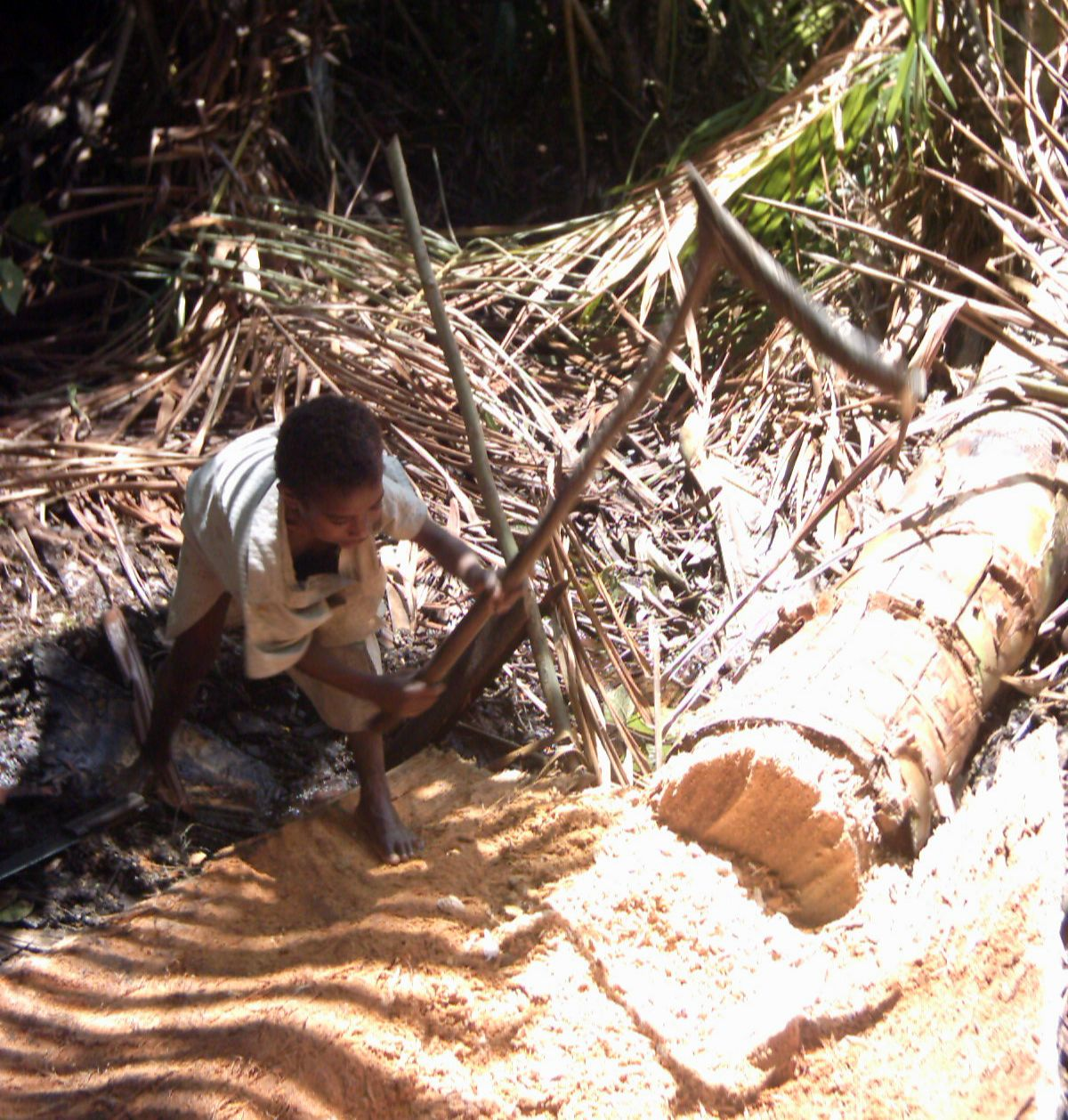
A sago palm being harvested for sago production

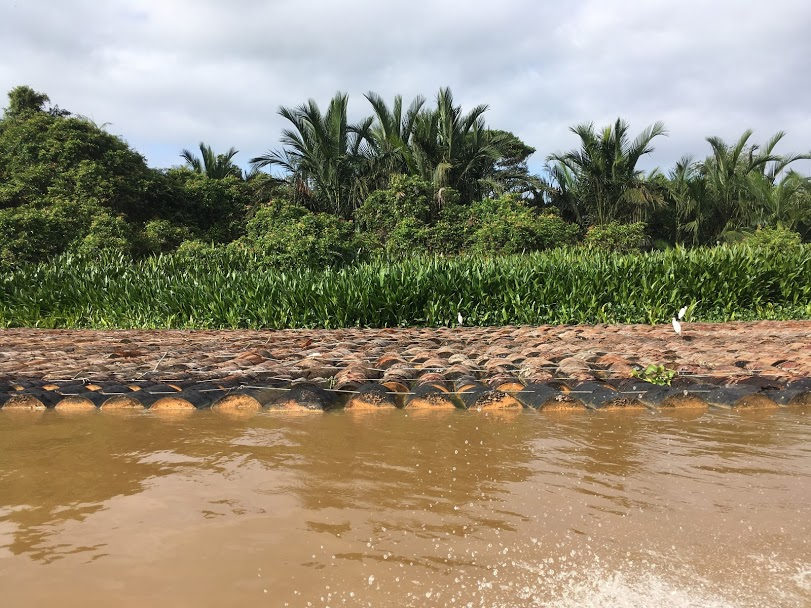
Sago logs ready for processing in Kampung Medong, Sarawak, Malaysia.

The sago palm, Metroxylon sagu, is found in tropical lowland forest and freshwater swamps across Southeast Asia and New Guinea and is the primary source of sago. It tolerates a wide variety of soils and may reach 30 meters in height (including the leaves). Several other species of the genus Metroxylon, particularly Metroxylon salomonense and Metroxylon amicarum, are also used as sources of sago throughout Melanesia and Micronesia.

Sago palms grow very quickly, in clumps of different ages similar to bananas, one sucker matures, then flowers and dies. It is replaced by another sucker, with up to 1.5 m of vertical stem growth per year. The stems are thick and are either self-supporting or have a moderate climbing habit; the leaves are pinnate. Each palm trunk produces a single inflorescence at its tip at the end of its life. Sago palms are harvested at the age of 7–15 years, just before or shortly after the inflorescence appears and when the stems are full of starch stored for use in reproduction. One palm can yield 150–300 kg of starch.

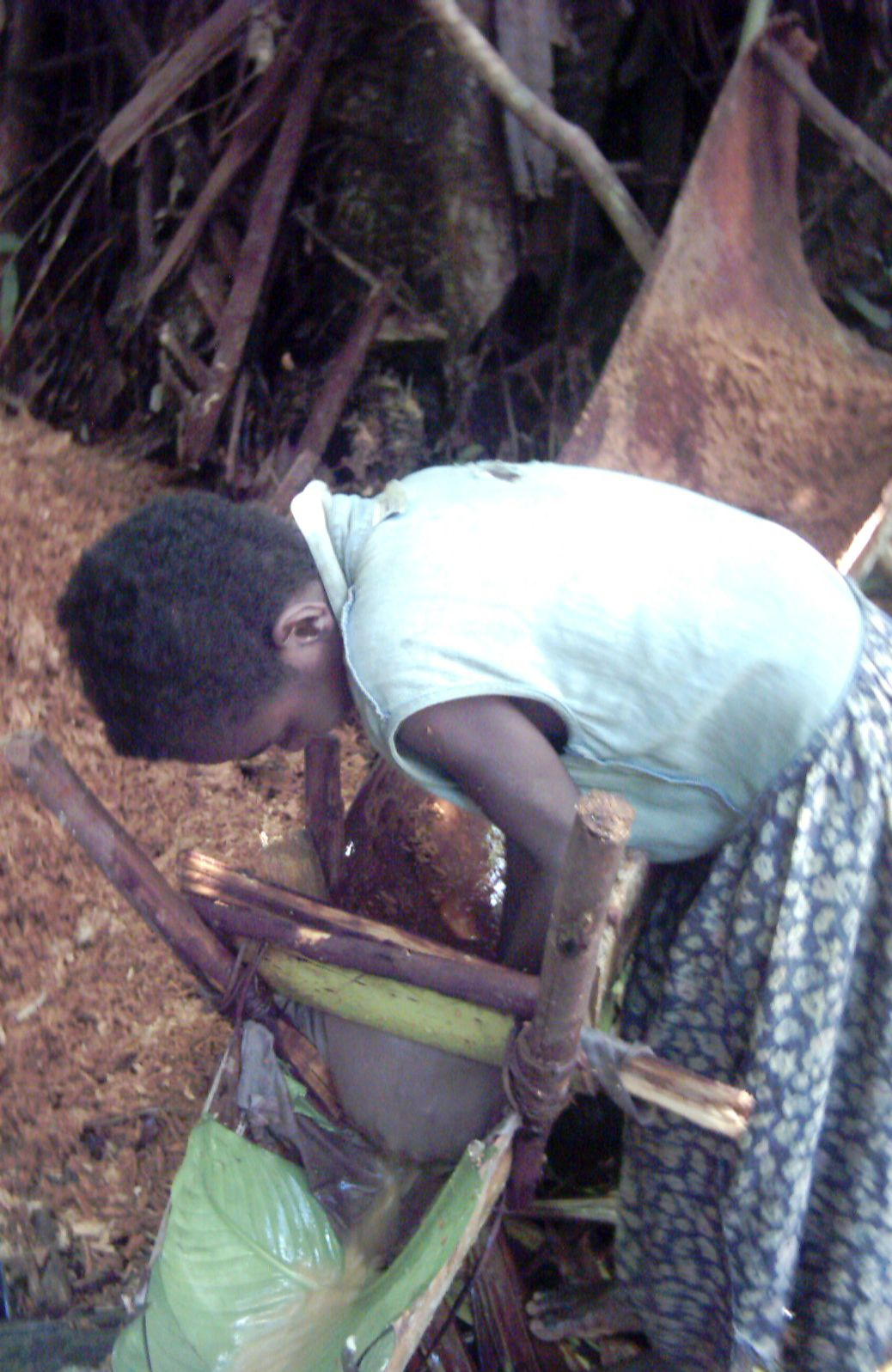
A sago starch filter

Sago is extracted from Metroxylon palms by splitting the stem lengthwise and removing the pith which is then crushed and kneaded to release the starch before being washed and strained to extract the starch from the fibrous residue. The raw starch suspension in water is then collected in a settling container.

=== Cycad sago ===
The sago cycad, Cycas revoluta, is a slow-growing wild or ornamental plant. Its common names "sago palm" and "king sago palm" are misnomers as cycads are not palms. Processed starch known as sago is made from this and other cycads. It is a less-common food source for some peoples of the Pacific and Indian Oceans. Unlike palms, cycads are highly poisonous: most parts of the plant contain the neurotoxins cycasin and BMAA. Consumption of cycad seeds has been implicated in the outbreak of Parkinson's disease-like neurological disorder in Guam and other locations in the Pacific. Thus, before any part of the plant may safely be eaten the toxins must be removed through extended processing.

Sago is extracted from the sago cycad by cutting the pith from the stem, root and seeds of the cycads, grinding the pith to a coarse flour, before being dried, pounded, and soaked. The starch is then washed carefully and repeatedly to leach out the natural toxins. The starchy residue is then dried and cooked, producing a starch similar to palm sago/sabudana.

=== Cassava sago ===
In many countries including Australia, Brazil, and India, tapioca pearls made from cassava root are also referred to as sago, sagu, sabudana, etc.

== Uses ==
=== Nutrition ===
Sago from Metroxylon palms is nearly pure carbohydrate and has very little protein, vitamins, or minerals. 100 grams (3 1/2 ounces) of dry sago typically comprises 94 grams of carbohydrate, 0.2 grams of protein, 0.5 grams of dietary fiber, 10 mg of calcium, 1.2 mg of iron and negligible amounts of fat, carotene, thiamine and ascorbic acid and yields approximately 1,490 kilojoules (355 kilocalories) of food energy. Sago palms are typically found in areas unsuited for other forms of agriculture, so sago cultivation is often the most ecologically appropriate form of land use and the nutritional deficiencies of the food can often be compensated for with other readily available foods.

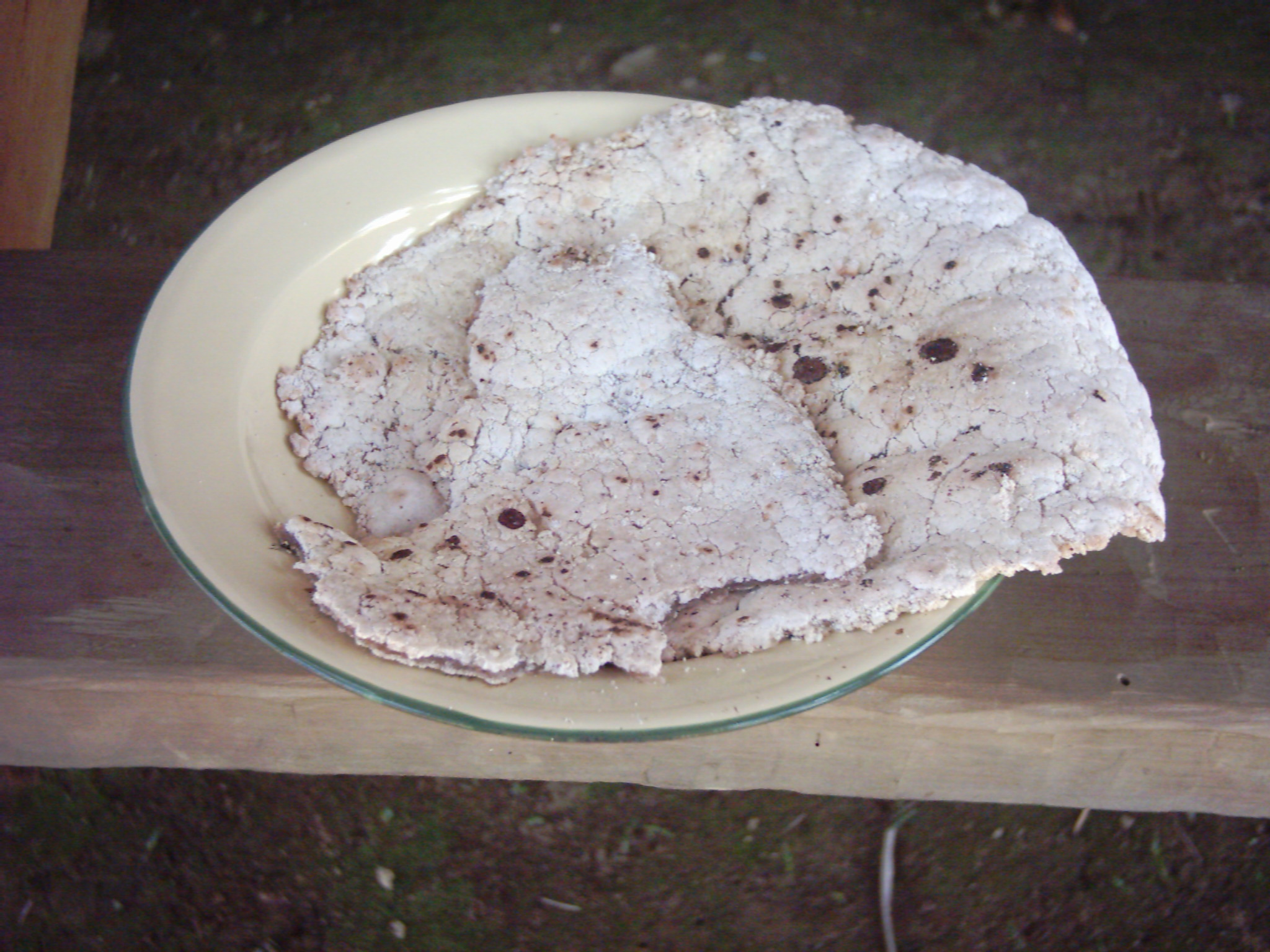
A sago pancake

Sago starch can be baked (resulting in a product analogous to bread, pancake, or biscuit) or mixed with boiling water to form a paste. It is a main staple of many traditional communities in New Guinea, Maluku, Borneo, South Sulawesi (most known in Luwu Regency) and Sumatra in the form of papeda. In Palembang, sago is one of the ingredients to make pempek. In Brunei and Sabah (East Malaysia), it is used for making the popular local dish called the ambuyat. It is also used commercially in making noodles and white bread. Sago starch can also be used as a thickener for other dishes. It can be made into steamed puddings such as sago plum pudding.

In Malaysia, the traditional food "keropok lekor" (fish cracker) uses sago as one of its main ingredients. To make keropok lekor in Losong in Kuala Terengganu, each kilogram of fish meat is mixed with half a kilogram of fine sago, with a little salt added for flavour. Tons of raw sago are imported each year into Malaysia to support the keropok lekor industry.

In 1805, two captured crew members of the shipwrecked schooner Betsey were kept alive until their escape from an undetermined island on a diet of sago.

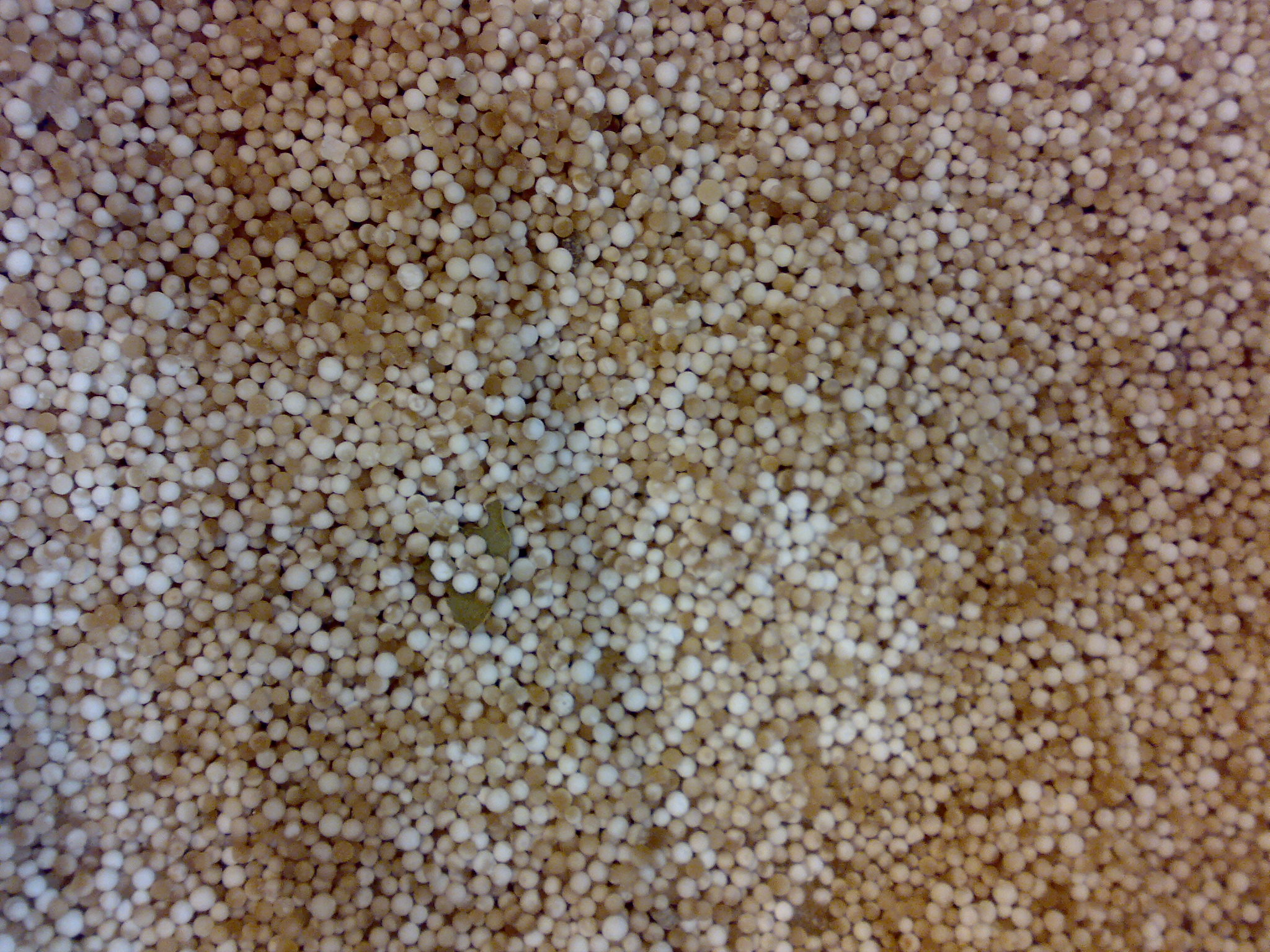
Pearl sago

Any starch can be pearled by heating and stirring small aggregates of moist starch, producing partly gelatinized dry kernels that swell but remain intact on boiling. Pearl sago closely resembles pearl tapioca. Both are typically small (about 2 mm diameter) dry, opaque balls. Both may be white (if very pure) or colored naturally gray, brown or black, or artificially pink, yellow, green, etc. When soaked and cooked, both become much larger, translucent, soft and spongy. Both are widely used in Indian, Bangladeshi and Sri Lankan cuisine in a variety of dishes and around the world, usually in puddings. In India, it is used in a variety of dishes such as desserts boiled with sweetened milk on occasion of religious fasts.

The Penan people of Borneo consume sago from Eugeissona palms as their staple carbohydrate.

=== Textile production ===
Sago starch is also used to treat fiber in a process is called sizing, which makes fibers easier to machine. The process helps to bind the fiber, give it a predictable slip for running on metal, standardize the level of hydration of the fiber and give the textile more body. Most of the natural based cloth and clothing has been sized; this leaves a residue which is removed in the first wash.

=== Other uses ===
Because many traditional people rely on sago palm as their main food staple and because supplies are finite, in some areas commercial or industrial harvesting of wild stands of sago palm can conflict with the food needs of local communities.

Research is conducted to potentially make use of the waste from the sago palm industry as an adsorbent for cleaning up oil spills.

== See also ==
- Arenga pinnata
- Landang
- Sandige
