= Oya River =

River in Sarawak, Malaysia

Oya
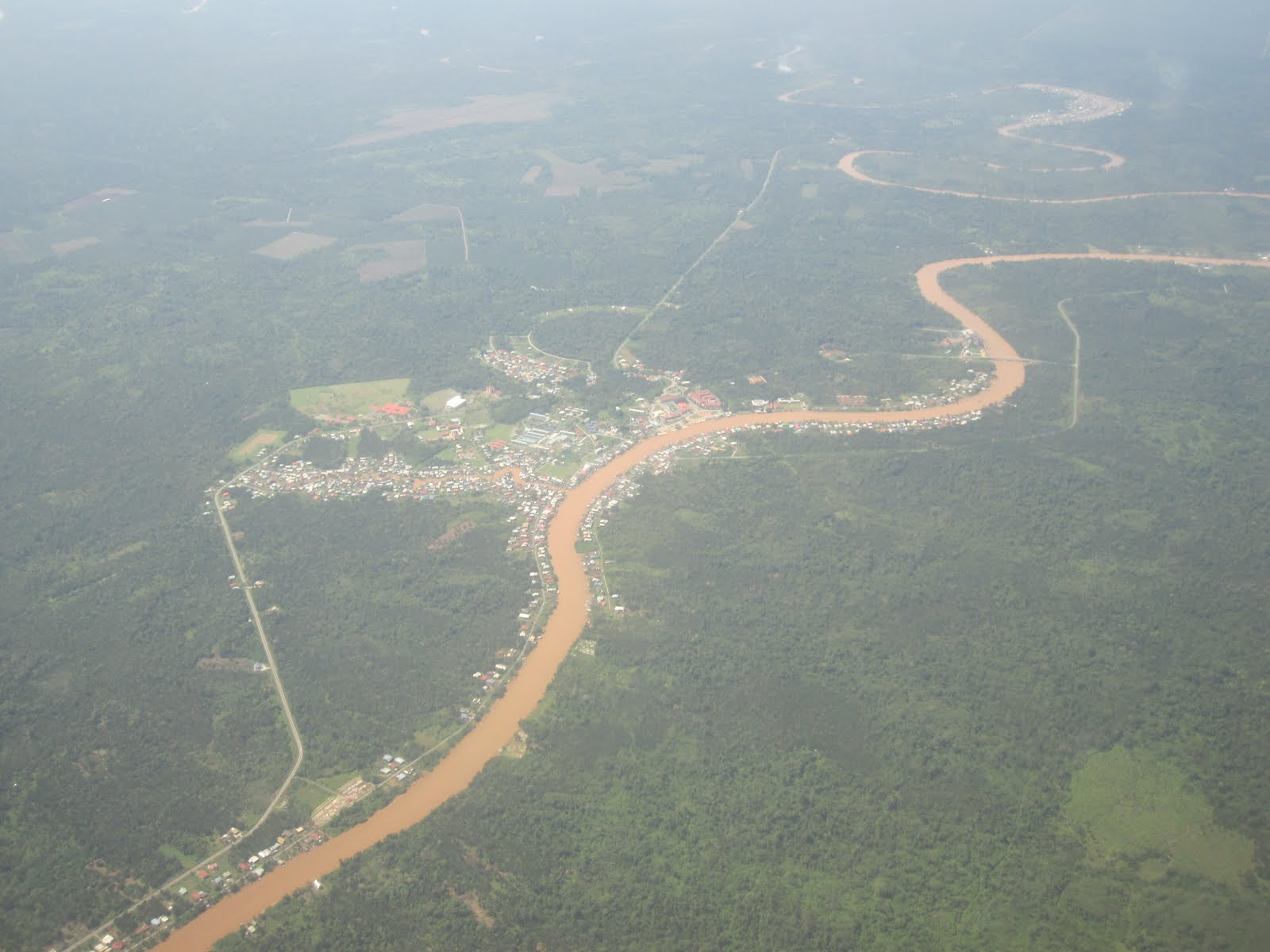
- Oya River flows through the small town of Dalat.

- Location in Malaysia

Location
- Country: Malaysia

Physical characteristics
- Source
  - location: Sarawak, Malaysia
- Mouth: Oya
  - location: South China Sea, Malaysia
  - coordinates: 2.875°N 111.882°E
  - elevation: 0 m (0 ft)
- Length: 31 km (19 mi)
- Basin size: 2143.92 km^{2}

Oya River (Malay: Sungai Oya or Batang Oya) is a river in Sarawak, Malaysia. The river mouth is located in Kuala Oya, Oya in Mukah Division. The 31 km long river has a basin area of 2,143.92 km^{2}.

The river is the longest river in Mukah Division.

== History ==
The river was once under the control of the Bruneian Empire until it was ceded to James Brooke in 1861 and became part of the Raj of Sarawak.

== Settlements ==
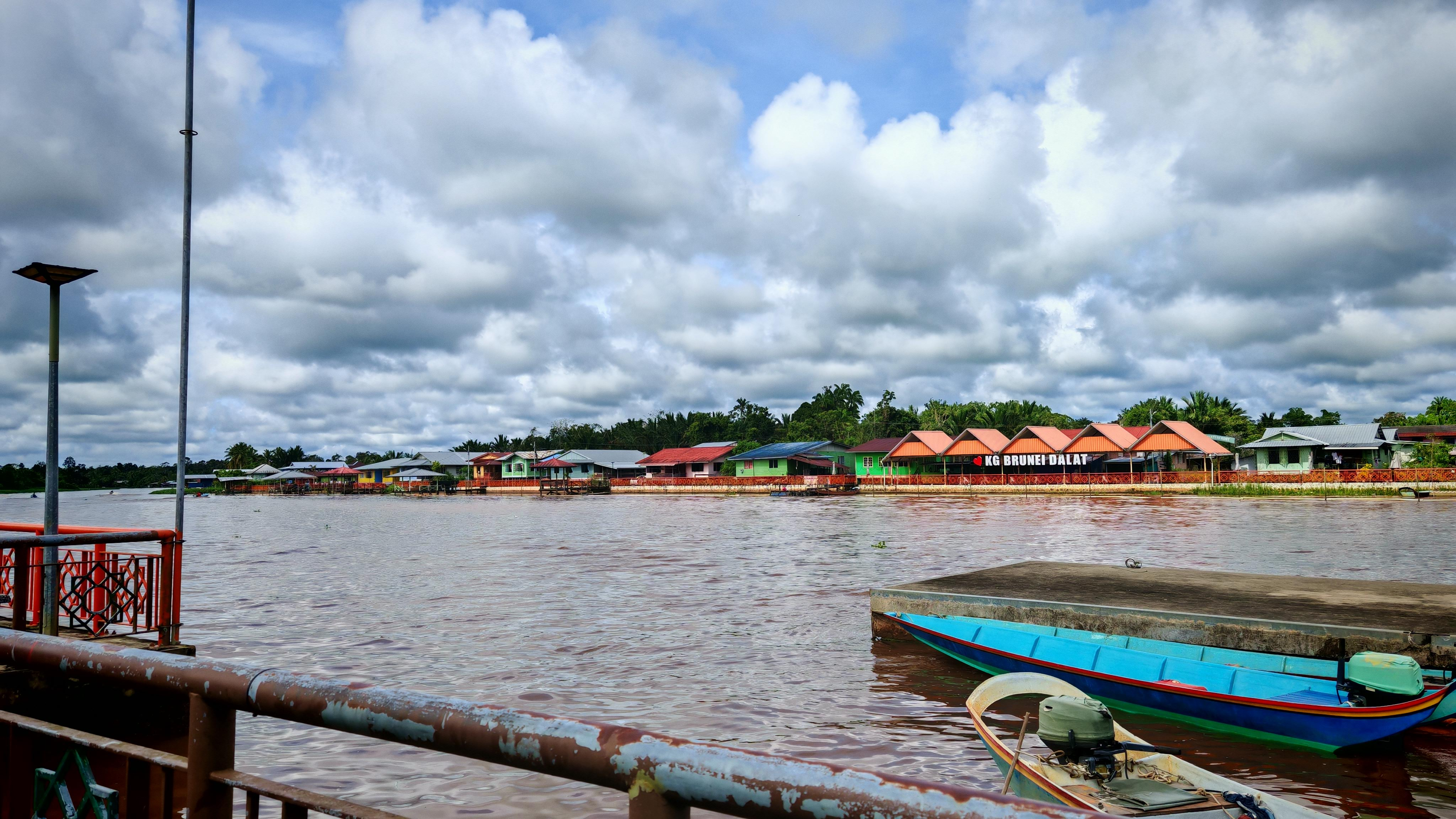
Kampung Brunei, this is how a typical Melanau village looks like in Dalat. The houses are built near the Oya River

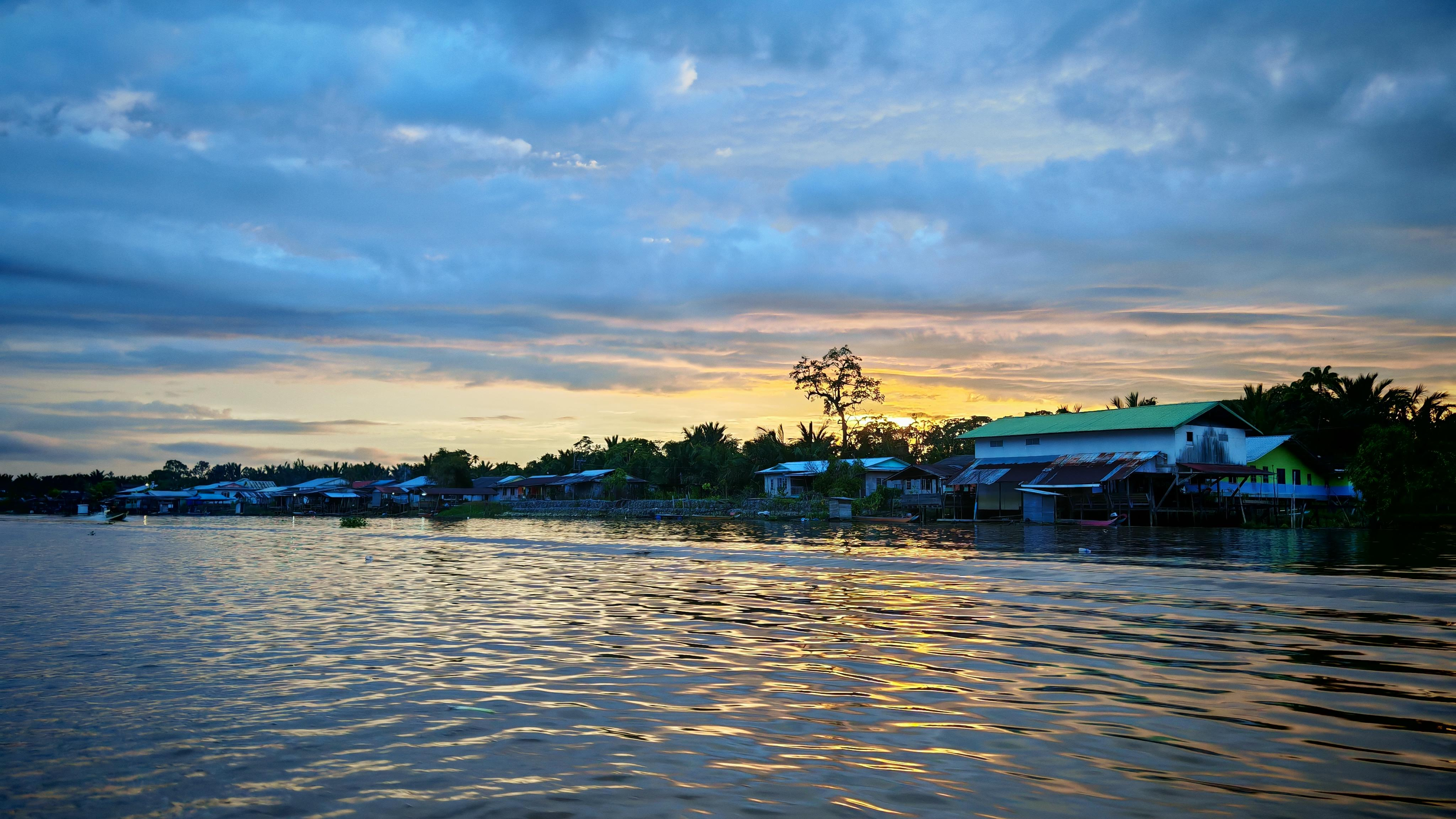
The river flows through Kampung Medong.

The river flows through small towns of Stapang, Dalat, and Oya.

== Issues ==
=== Water hyacinth overgrowth ===
The uncontrolled growth of water hyacinth posed a number of problems such as restricting the river flow and causing the water to become stagnant; making it difficult for fishermen and boatmen to maneuver their boats, especially the ones with motor engines, due to entanglement; clogging the drains and other waterways which, in turn, could cause floods; and turning the Oya River into a hideout for crocodiles. The Ministry of Transport (MoT) Sarawak will cooperate with the Department of Irrigation and Drainage (DID) and Universiti Malaysia Sarawak (Unimas) in conducting a comprehensive study with regards to the problem.

=== Crocodile attacks ===
Reports of saltwater crocodile attacks are pretty common especially at the downstream part of the river. The victims of these attacks are mostly fishermen who depend on the river for their livelihoods. A joint operation by Sarawak Forestry Corporation (SFC) and Royal Malaysia Police in March 2021 recorded 22 sightings of the reptiles. A 4.5-meter crocodile was caught during the operation.
