= Fatimah Abdullah =

Malaysian politician

Yang Berhormat Dato Sri Fatimah Ting Abdullah PNBS PGBK MLA
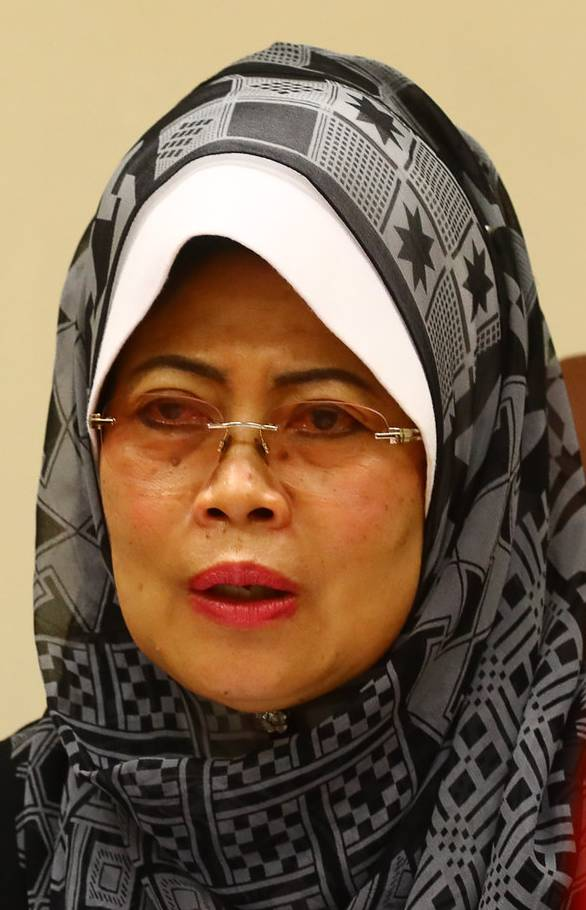
- Fatimah in 2017 during a conference with UNIMAS

Ministerial roles (Sarawak)
- 2011–: Minister of Women, Early Childhood and Community Wellbeing Development

Faction represented in Sarawak State Legislative Assembly
- 2001–2018: Barisan Nasional
- 2018–: Gabungan Parti Sarawak
- 2018: Parti Pesaka Bumiputera Bersatu

Personal details
- Born: Ting Sai Ming; 1 February 1957 (age 69) Dalat, Crown Colony of Sarawak (now Sarawak, Malaysia)
- Citizenship: Malaysian
- Party: Parti Pesaka Bumiputera Bersatu (PBB)
- Other political affiliations: Barisan Nasional (BN) (–2018, allied : since 2020); Gabungan Parti Sarawak (GPS) (since 2018); Perikatan Nasional (PN) (allied : since 2020)
- Spouse: Adi Badozaman Tuah
- Children: 2
- Occupation: Politician
- Website: Official Facebook

Fatimah Ting binti Abdullah (born Ting Sai Ming; 1 February 1957) is a Malaysian politician from the Parti Pesaka Bumiputera Bersatu (PBB), a component party of the ruling Gabungan Parti Sarawak (GPS) coalition. She has served as the State Minister of Women, Early Childhood and Community Wellbeing Development of Sarawak under Chief Ministers Abang Abdul Rahman Johari Abang Openg, Adenan Satem and Abdul Taib Mahmud since September 2011 as well as and Member of the Sarawak State Legislative Assembly (MLA) for Dalat since September 2001.

== Background ==
Fatimah hails from Kampung Teh in Dalat, Sarawak. Her father is a Foochow Chinese and her mother is a Melanau. She was brought up a Muslim by her maternal grandmother. She is married to Datu Dr. Adi Badiozaman Tuah, a social activist and the Director of the Sarawak Islamic Council of Educational Services Bureau. Together they have two children.

Fatimah is an educationist. She was a former principal of Sekolah Menengah Kebangsaan Puteri Wilayah in Kuala Lumpur.

== Political career ==
Fatimah's candidacy for the post of Women's Chief in the Parti Pesaka Bumiputera Bersatu (PBB), a component party of the ruling GPS coalition, was unopposed after Empiang Jabu Anak Antak stepped down in 2018. Fatimah, from the Bumiputera wing, takes over from Empiang, who is from the Pesaka wing.

== Election results ==
Sarawak State Legislative Assembly
Year	Constituency	Candidate	Votes	Pct	Oppoenent(s)	Votes	Pct	Ballots cast	Majority	Turnout
2001	N44 Dalat	Fatimah Abdullah (PBB)	7,497	88.51%	Peter Nari Dina (IND)	973	11.49%	8,660	6,524	62.82%
2006	N50 Dalat	Fatimah Abdullah (PBB)	Unopposed							
2011	N50 Dalat	Fatimah Abdullah (PBB)	6,288	80.17%	Sylvester Ajah Subah @ Ajah Bin Subah (PKR)	1,298	16.55%	8,069	4,990	68.05%
2011	N50 Dalat	Fatimah Abdullah (PBB)	6,288	80.17%	Salleh Mahali (IND)	257	3.28%	8,069	4,990	68.05%
2016	N56 Dalat	Fatimah Abdullah (PBB)	7,107	90.14%	Sim Eng Hua (PKR)	777	9.86%	8,080	6,330	70.63%
2021	N56 Dalat	Fatimah Abdullah (PBB)	7,085	93.90%	Salleh Mahali (PBK)	460	6.10%	7,657	6,625	61.24%

== Honours ==
- Sarawak
  - Knight Commander of the Most Exalted Order of the Star of Sarawak (PNBS) – Dato Sri (2017)
  - Commander of the Order of the Star of Hornbill Sarawak (PGBK) – Datuk (2011)
  - Gold Medal of the Sarawak Independence Diamond Jubilee Medal (2023)
