= Oya, Malaysia =

Oya
- Town
- Location in East Malaysia Location in Malaysia
- Coordinates: 2°51′22″N 111°52′29″E
- Country: Malaysia
- State: Sarawak
- Division: Mukah
- Subdistrict: Oya

Population (2020)
  - Total: 6,207
- Time zone: UTC+8 (MST)
- Postcode: 96410

Oya is a town and the administrative centre of the subdistrict of the same name in Mukah Division, in the Malaysian state of Sarawak. It is located near the mouth of Oya River with the South China Sea. Oya is about 26 kilometres (16 miles) to the west of Mukah, the division's administrative town.

The population of the town was 6,027 in 2020.

Oya has a secondary school, namely Oya National Secondary School (Malay: Sekolah Menengah Kebangsaan Oya). It also has primary schools: Datu Pengiran Mohamad National School (Sekolah Kebangsaan Datu Pengiran Mohamad), Yak Tee (Chinese) National-Type School (Sekolah Jenis Kebangsaan (Cina) Yak Tee), KG Senau National School (Sekolah Kebangsaan KG Senau), Kampung Bakong Terus National School (Sekolah Kebangsaan Kampung Bakong Terus), KPG Teh National School (Sekolah Kebangsaan KPG Teh).
