= Matu District =

District in Mukah Division, Sarawak, Malaysia

- District
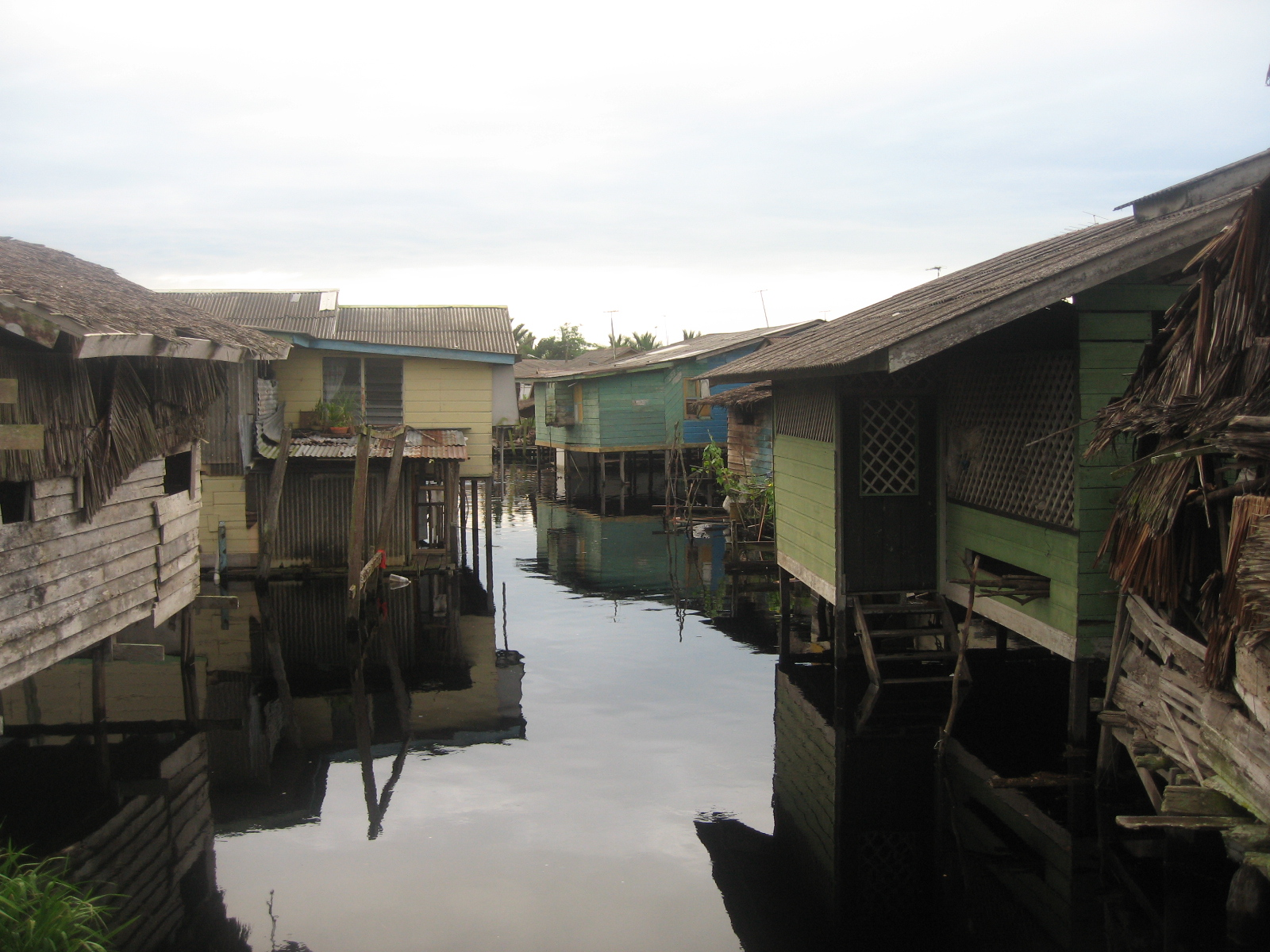
- Stilt houses in Matu during a flood

- Location within Borneo
- Coordinates: 2°41′0″N 111°32′0″E
- Country: Malaysia
- State: Sarawak
- Division: Mukah

Area
  - Total: 1,600 km^{2} (620 sq mi)

Population (2024)
  - Total: 31,516
  - Density: 20/km^{2} (51/sq mi)
- Website: matu-darodc.sarawak.gov.my

The Matu District is a district in Mukah Division, Sarawak, Malaysia. Before Mukah Division was established, Matu was within Sarikei Division. There are more than 20 villages in the district, with Melanau making up the majority of the population. Chinese are the second biggest population after the Melanau, followed by Iban and Malay. The population is 31,516 in 2024. The Majlis Daerah Matu-Daro (Matu-Daro District Council) is located in Matu town. The building itself is a landmark and the biggest building in Matu. Matu District shares the same local authority with Daro District.

== Demographics ==
Total population of every areas in Matu, Sarawak. These population are exactly based on their ethnics in Sarawak.

Melanau is the majority ethnics that lived in Matu, along with several community from Chinese, Iban, and Malay. Same as similar population in Daro, Matu also having the slightly higher population due to significant economic development factors, as well as their own cultural and tradition factors.

Ethnic composition of Matu District (2024)
Ethnicities / Nationality	Percentage
Malays	30.87%
Iban	13.9%
Bidayuh	0.25%
Melanau	37.68%
Other Bumiputeras	0.06%
Chinese	16.72%
Indians	0%
Others	0%
Non-Malaysian	0.51%

Ethnicity	2024	
Ethnicity	Pop.	%
Malays	9730	30.87%
Iban	4382	13.9%
Bidayuh	79	0.25%
Melanau	11876	37.68%
Other Bumiputeras	20	0.06%
Chinese	5268	16.72%
Indians	0	0%
Others	0	0%
Malaysian total	31355	99.49%
Non-Malaysian	161	0.51%
Total	31516	100.00%

Historical population
Year	Pop.	±%
1995	10,837	—
2004	18,620	+71.8%
2010	20,794	+11.7%
2015	25,893	+24.5%
2024	31,516	+21.7%
