= Dalat (state constituency) =

State constituency in Sarawak

Dalat (N56)
Sarawak constituency

State constituency
- Legislature: Sarawak State Legislative Assembly
MLA
Vacant
- Constituency created: 1987
- First contested: 1991
- Last contested: 2026

Dalat is a state constituency in Sarawak, Malaysia, that has been represented in the Sarawak State Legislative Assembly since 1991.

The state constituency was created in the 1987 redistribution and is mandated to return a single member to the Sarawak State Legislative Assembly under the first past the post voting system.

== Demographics ==
Ethnic breakdown of Dalat's electorate as of 2022
1. Malay-Muslim bumiputera (87.5%)
2. Chinese (8.20%)
3. Sarawak bumiputera (3.50%)
4. Other ethnicities (0.80%)

== History ==
As of 2020, Dalat has a population of 72,954 people.

=== Polling districts ===
According to the gazette issued on 31 October 2022, the Dalat constituency has a total of 16 polling districts.

| State constituency | Polling Districts | Code | Location |
|---|---|---|---|
| Dalat（N56） | Tanam | 213/56/01 | SK Kpg. Tanam Dalat |
| Dalat（N56） | Dalat | 213/56/02 | SJK (C) Chin Hua Dalat |
| Dalat（N56） | Kut | 213/56/03 | SK Kut Tengah |
| Dalat（N56） | Balan | 213/56/04 | SK Kpg. Balan |
| Dalat（N56） | Ud | 213/56/05 | SK Kpg. Sg. Ud |
| Dalat（N56） | Baru Dalat | 213/56/06 | Balai Raya Kpg. Baru Dalat |
| Dalat（N56） | Sungai Dalam | 213/56/07 | Balai Raya Sg. Dalam Dalat |
| Dalat（N56） | Klid | 213/56/08 | SK Kpg. Klid/ Plajau |
| Dalat（N56） | Kekan | 213/56/09 | Balai Raya Kpg. Kekan Dalat |
| Dalat（N56） | Medong | 213/56/10 | SK St. John Medong |
| Dalat（N56） | Kut Muara | 213/56/11 | SK St. Kevin Sg. Kut |
| Dalat（N56） | Narub | 213/56/12 | SJK (C) San San |
| Dalat（N56） | Oya | 213/56/13 | SK Datu Pengiran Mohamad |
| Dalat（N56） | Terus | 213/56/14 | SK Kpg. Bakong/Terus |
| Dalat（N56） | Teh Oya | 213/56/15 | SK Kpg. Teh Dalat |
| Dalat（N56） | Senau | 213/56/16 | SK Kpg. Senau |

=== Representation history ===
Members of the Legislative Assembly for Dalat
| Assembly | No | Years | Member | Party |
Constituency created from Oya, Igan and Balingian
| 13th | N41 | 1991-1996 | Mohd Effendi Norwawi | BN (PBB) |
| 14th | N44 | 1996–2001 | Mohd Effendi Norwawi | BN (PBB) |
| 15th | N44 | 2001-2006 | Fatimah Abdullah @ Ting Sai Ming (陳賽明) | BN (PBB) |
| 16th | N50 | 2006–2011 | Fatimah Abdullah @ Ting Sai Ming (陳賽明) | BN (PBB) |
| 17th | N50 | 2011–2016 | Fatimah Abdullah @ Ting Sai Ming (陳賽明) | BN (PBB) |
| 18th | N56 | 2016–2018 | Fatimah Abdullah @ Ting Sai Ming (陳賽明) | BN (PBB) |
| 18th | N56 | 2018-2021 | Fatimah Abdullah @ Ting Sai Ming (陳賽明) | GPS (PBB) |
| 19th | N56 | 2021–2026 | Fatimah Abdullah @ Ting Sai Ming (陳賽明) | GPS (PBB) |

== Election results ==
Sarawak state election, 2026
| Party | Candidate | Votes | % | ∆% |
|---|---|---|---|---|
| GPS | | | | ▲ |
| PH | | | | ▲ |
| Total valid votes | | | | |
| Total rejected ballots | | | | |
| Unreturned ballots | | | | |
| Turnout | | | | |
| Registered electors | | | | |
| Majority | | | | |

Sarawak state election, 2021
| Party | Candidate | Votes | % | ∆% |
|---|---|---|---|---|
| GPS | Fatimah Abdullah @ Ting Sai Ming | 7,085 | 93.90 | ▲93.90 |
| PBK | Salleh Mahali | 460 | 6.10 | ▲6.10 |
| Total valid votes | | 7,545 | 100.00 | |
| Total rejected ballots | | 85 | | |
| Unreturned ballots | | 27 | | |
| Turnout | | 7,657 | 61.24 | ▼9.39 |
| Registered electors | | 12,503 | | |
| Majority | | 6,625 | 87.81 | ▲7.48 |
| GPS gain from BN | | Swing | | ? |
Source(s) https://lom.agc.gov.my/ilims/upload/portal/akta/outputp/1718688/PUB687.pdf

Sarawak state election, 2016
| Party | Candidate | Votes | % | ∆% |
|---|---|---|---|---|
| BN | Fatimah Abdullah @ Ting Sai Ming | 7,107 | 90.14 | ▲9.97 |
| PKR | Sim Eng Hua | 777 | 9.86 | ▼6.69 |
| Total valid votes | | 7,884 | 100.00 | |
| Total rejected ballots | | 150 | | |
| Unreturned ballots | | 46 | | |
| Turnout | | 8,080 | 70.63 | ▲2.58 |
| Registered electors | | 11,440 | | |
| Majority | | 6,330 | 80.29 | ▲17.22 |
| BN hold | | Swing | | |
Source(s) "Federal Government Gazette - Notice of Contested Election, State Legislative Assembly of the State of Sarawak [P.U. (B) 190/2016]" (PDF). Attorney General's Chambers of Malaysia. 25 April 2016. Archived from the original (PDF) on 12 June 2017. "Senarai Calon yang Disahkan Layak Bertanding Pilihan Raya Dewan Undangan Negeri ke-11". Election Commission of Malaysia. 25 April 2016. Archived from the original on 25 April 2016.

Sarawak state election, 2011
| Party | Candidate | Votes | % | ∆% |
|---|---|---|---|---|
| BN | Fatimah Abdullah @ Ting Sai Ming | 6,288 | 80.17 | ▲80.17 |
| PKR | Sylvester Ajah Subah @ Ajah Subah | 1,298 | 16.55 | ▲16.55 |
| Independent | Salleh Mahali | 257 | 3.28 | ▲3.28 |
| Total valid votes | | 7,843 | 100.00 | |
| Total rejected ballots | | 195 | | |
| Unreturned ballots | | 31 | | |
| Turnout | | 8,069 | 68.05 | ▲5.23 |
| Registered electors | | 11,857 | | |
| Majority | | 4,990 | 63.62 | ▲63.62 |
| BN hold | | Swing | | |
Source(s) "Federal Government Gazette - Results of Contested Election and Statements of the Poll after the Official Addition of Votes Sarawak [P.U. (B) 245/2011]" (PDF). Attorney General's Chambers of Malaysia. 29 April 2011.

Sarawak state election, 2006
| Party | Candidate | Votes | % | ∆% |
|---|---|---|---|---|
On nomination day, Fatimah Abdullah @ Ting Sai Ming won uncontested.
| BN | Fatimah Abdullah @ Ting Sai Ming | | | |
| Total valid votes | | | | |
| Total rejected ballots | | | | |
| Unreturned ballots | | | | |
| Turnout | | | | |
| Registered electors | | 11,423 | | |
| Majority | | | | |
| BN hold | | Swing | | |

Sarawak state election, 2001
| Party | Candidate | Votes | % | ∆% |
|---|---|---|---|---|
| BN | Fatimah Abdullah @ Ting Sai Ming | 7,497 | 88.51 | ▲16.24 |
| Independent | Peter Nari Dina | 973 | 11.49 | ▲11.49 |
| Total valid votes | | 8,470 | 100.00 | |
| Total rejected ballots | | 177 | | |
| Unreturned ballots | | 13 | | |
| Turnout | | 8,660 | 62.82 | ▼0.80 |
| Registered electors | | 13,786 | | |
| Majority | | 6,524 | 77.02 | ▲32.49 |
| BN hold | | Swing | | |

Sarawak state election, 1996
| Party | Candidate | Votes | % | ∆% |
|---|---|---|---|---|
| BN | Mohd Effendi Norwawi | 6,339 | 72.27 | ▼5.53 |
| Independent | Sim Eng Hua | 2,432 | 27.73 | ▲27.73 |
| Total valid votes | | 8,771 | 100.00 | |
| Total rejected ballots | | 186 | | |
| Unreturned ballots | | 22 | | |
| Turnout | | 8,979 | 63.62 | ▼5.83 |
| Registered electors | | 14,113 | | |
| Majority | | 3,907 | 44.54 | ▼12.09 |
| BN hold | | Swing | | |

Sarawak state election, 1991
| Party | Candidate | Votes | % |
|---|---|---|---|
| BN | Mohd Effendi Norwawi | 7,719 | 77.80 |
| PBDS | Peter Nari Dina | 2,104 | 21.21 |
| Independent | Edmund Dingun Tandok | 98 | 0.99 |
| Total valid votes | | 9,921 | 100.00 |
| Total rejected ballots | | 117 | |
| Unreturned ballots | | 28 | |
| Turnout | | 10,066 | 69.45 |
| Registered electors | | 14,494 | |
| Majority | | 5,615 | 56.63 |
This was a new constituency created.
