= Mukah Division =

- Coat of arms

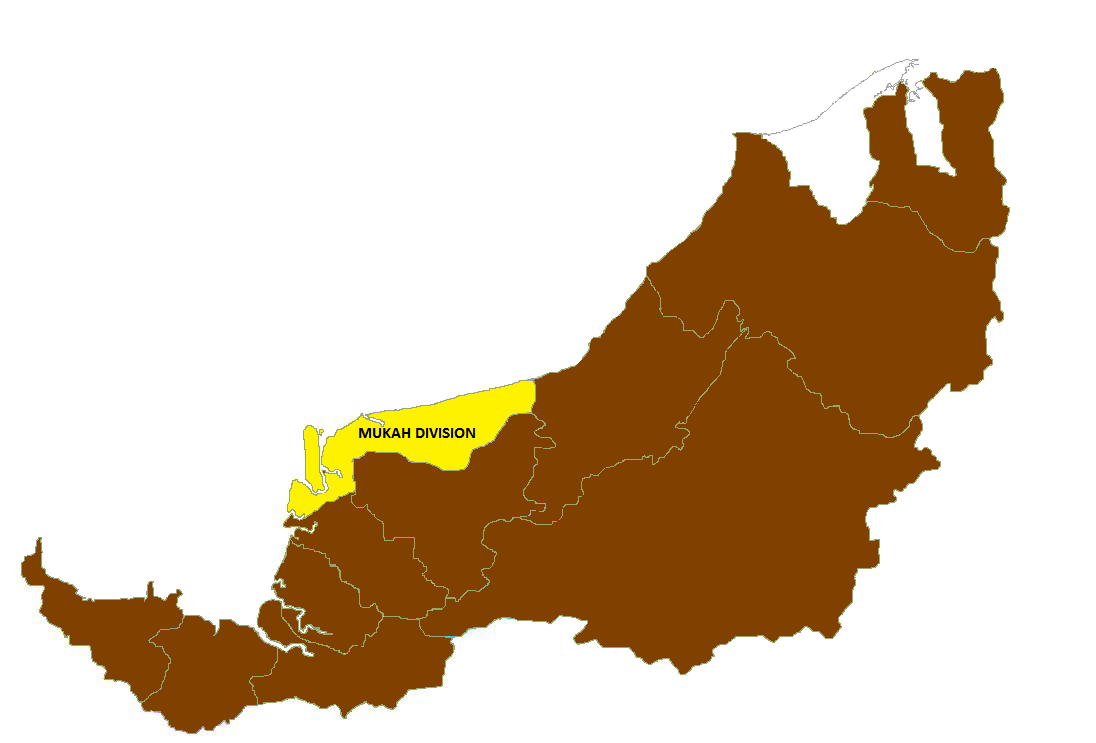
- Division Office location: Mukah
- Local area government(s): Majlis Daerah Dalat & Mukah (MDDM); Majlis Daerah Matu-Daro (MDMD)

Area
  - Total: 6,997.61 km^{2} (2,701.79 sq mi)

Population (2020)
  - Total: 107,161
  - Density: 15.3139/km^{2} (39.6629/sq mi)
- Resident: Kueh Lei Poh
- Districts: Mukah, Dalat, Daro, Matu & Tanjung Manis
- Sub-districts: Balingian, Oya & Igan

Mukah Division is one of the twelve administrative divisions in Sarawak, Malaysia. It was established on 1 March 2002 and it has a total area of 6,997.61 square kilometres.

Mukah Division contains five administrative districts: Mukah, Dalat, Daro, Matu and Tanjung Manis District. The total population is 110,543. The population is culturally mixed, with mostly Melanau, Malay, Iban, and Chinese predominating.

== Resident Roll of Honor ==
No.	Residents	From	Until
1.	Datu Haji Sarudu bin Haji Hoklai	1 March 2002	5 March 2006
2.	Tuan Haji Abdullah bin Jamil	6 March 2006	24 May 2009
3.	Tuan Haji Dr. Junaidi @ Saudi bin Narani	25 May 2009	23 May 2013
4.	Tuan Haji Mohd Supaih bin Haji Hamdan	2 July 2013	3 July 2016
5.	Awang Johari bin Awang Mustapha	4 October 2016	31 July 2018
6.	Hajah Hamdiah binti Haji Bakir	August 2018	2 February 2022
7.	Datu Kueh Lei Poh	July 2022	Now

== Development ==
As a relatively new division in Sarawak, Mukah identifies seven core development sectors. Major rivers in Mukah are Batang Mukah, Batang Oya, Batang Igan and Batang Rajang. The sectors are as follows;

- Fishery
- Agriculture
- Industry
- Tourism
- Human Resource
- Infrastructure and Info-structure
- Community Harmonious Lives (Kesejahteraan Hidup Masyarakat)

=== Infrastructure ===
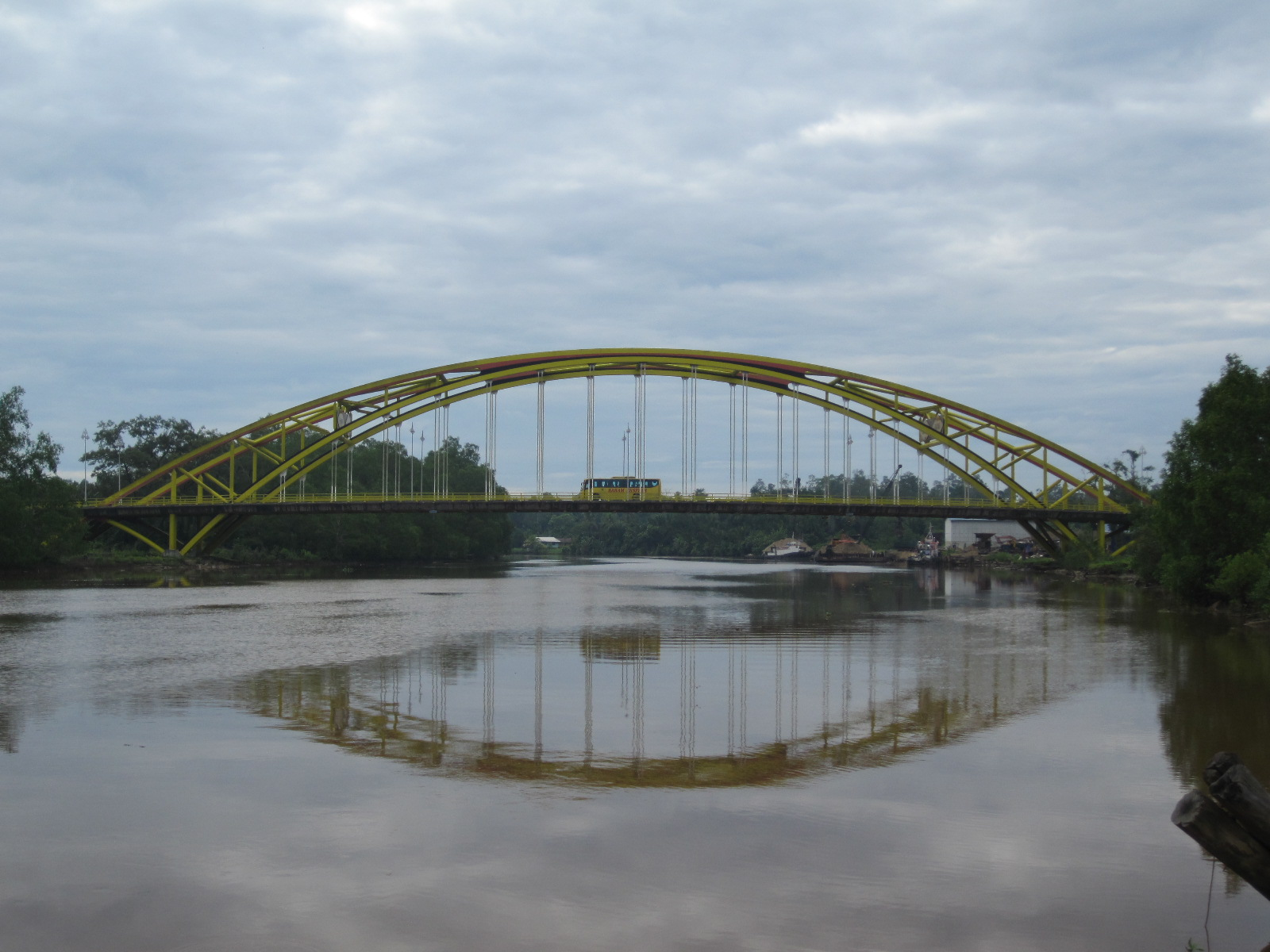
The Batang Mukah Bridge, one of the most notable structures of Mukah.

After a few years, the division has completed a coastal road that connects Kuala Balingian/Balingian/Mukah/Dalat/Oya/Igan/Matu/Daro.A RM 48 million, 170 meters double-arch suspension bridge over Batang Mukah was opened to public on 16 September 2005.

During the 2014 Balingian by-election, Deputy Prime Minister Tan Sri Muhyiddin Yassin has announced that a new airport will be built for Mukah. The overall cost of the project is estimated at RM 600 million. The earthworks began on 16 April 2014 at a site about 7 kilometers from the town centre. As of February 2015, 16% of the construction was completed.

==== Education ====
There are three higher education institutes in the division; UiTM Mukah campus, Centex Mukah and Mukah Polytechnic. Also, there is a coal power plant built in Matadeng, some 30 km from the Mukah town. In March 2015, Tun Pehin Sri Abdul Taib Mahmud has launched the Laila Taib College (KLT) Mukah Campus. The 35-acre campus is within the Mukah Education Hub and costs RM 336 million. The campus is still under construction.

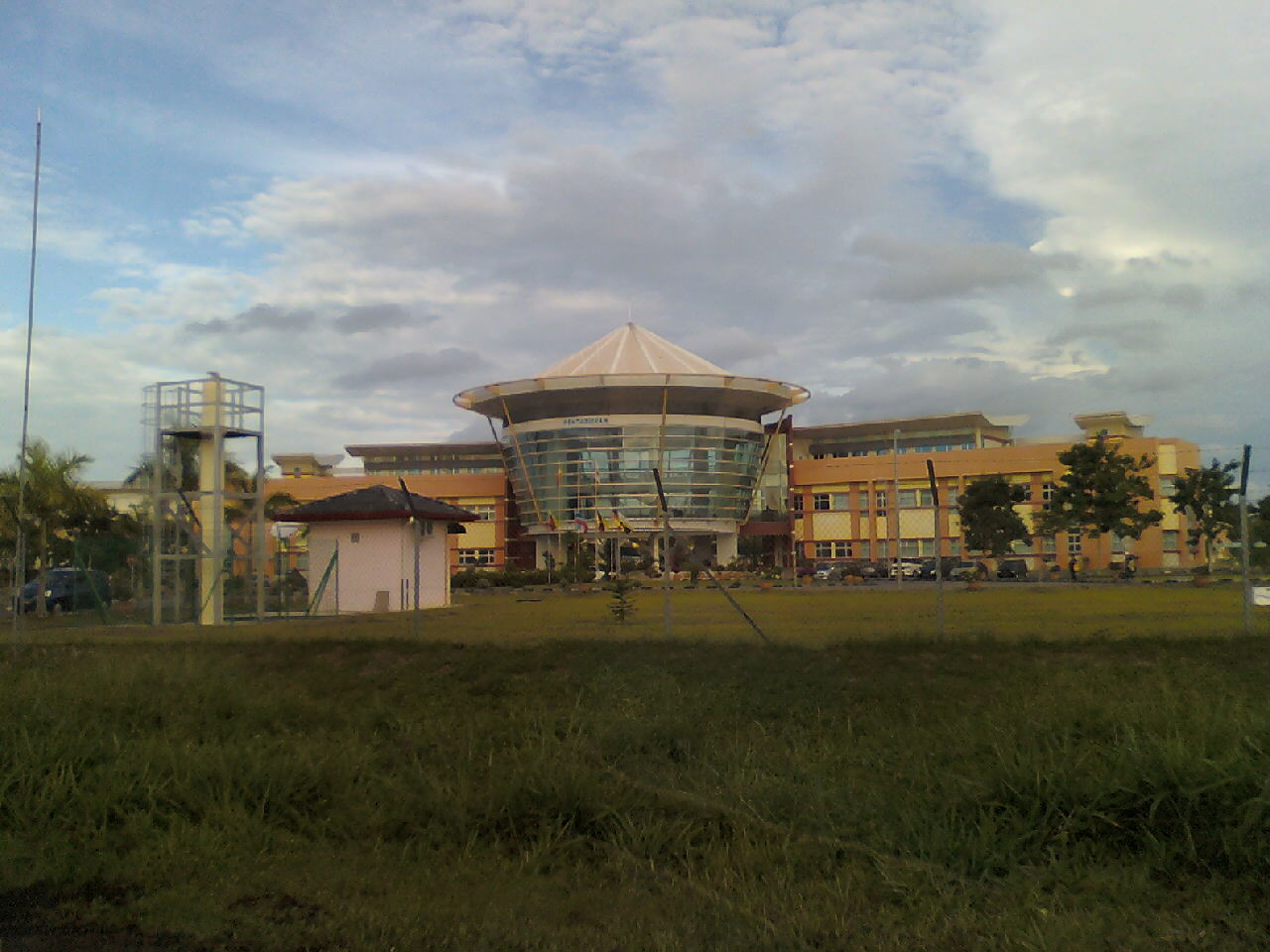
Mukah Polytechnic

=== Fishery ===
Meanwhile, in Belawai, the fishery sector is being focused. There is Tanjung Manis Deep Sea Fishery Complex to support the sector. Tanjung Manis also connected to Sibu via Serdeng/Tanjung Manis/Bruit/Sg.Nai Road and Sibu/Bawang Assan/Serdeng Road.

The fishery industry is synonym with Mukah town too. The Melanaus are fish lovers and fish are incorporated in traditional dishes, for example umai. Mukah town even has statues of Ikan Merah(Red Snapper) and Udang(Prawn) that suggests the importance of the industry to the town and the division wholly.

=== Tourism ===
Mukah offers a different tourism attraction in Sarawak. Being the only Melanau-majority town, the Melanau culture is the best that Mukah has to offer.

==== Kaul Festival (Pesta Kaul) ====
There is a grand Kaul Festival (Pesta Kaul in Malay) held annually at Kala Dana Beach (Pantai Kala Dana in Malay) at Mukah. In 2012, approximately 70,000 visitors attended the festival. A park called Kala Dana Recreation Park or Site of Kaul Festival (Tapak Pesta Kaul) was built there and had recently been renovated and is now more modern. It also has an observation tower. This festival attracts many visitors from Sarawak-wide and sometimes even foreign tourists. The chief minister also attends this festival each year. For 2014, the festival was held on 23–27 April.

==== Places of interest ====
Some of the places of interest in Mukah Division are:

- Bruit National Park, Daro
- Sungai Pasin Wildlife Park, Matu
- Kampung Sok Melanau Longhouse, Matu
- Sago Farm, Dalat
- Kenyana Lake, Mukah
- Taman Tanjung Pedada, Kpg. Tanjung, Mukah
- Kala Dana Recreation Park, Mukah
- Setia Raja Boulevard Recreation Park, Mukah
- Blue Horizon Beach, Mukah
- Kampung Kuala Hilir Oya, Dalat
- Telaga Penawar Kampung Jemoreng, Matu
- Belawai Beach, Daro
- Lamin Dana (Traditional Melanau Longhouse), Mukah
- Pantai Kampung Judan Hilir, Mukah

=== Agriculture ===
The main agricultural products are oil palm, sago, paddy, pineapple and aquaculture.

=== Industry ===
In 1996, the Mukah Light Industrial Estate was established by the Mukah river, about 3 km from the Mukah town. The planned area covers 61 hectares. The other industrial estate in Mukah Division is the Tanjung Manis Timber Processing Zone developed by Sarawak Timber Industry Development Corporation (STIDC).

== Demography ==
=== Ethnic groups ===
Ethnic groups in Mukah (2010)
Ethnic	Percent
Melanau	60.6%
Iban	18.6%
Non-citizen	5.9%
Malay	5.8%
Chinese	5.7%
Others	3.3%

As of 2010, Melanau is the largest ethnic group in Mukah Division with more than half of the population identified themselves as Melanau. Iban is the second largest with 18.6% of the population.

== Administration ==
=== Members of Parliament ===
Parliament	Member of Parliament	Party
P206 Tanjong Manis	YB Tuan Haji Yusuf Abd Wahab	GPS (PBB)
P207 Igan	YB Tuan Haji Ahmad Johnie Zawawi	GPS (PBB)
P213 Mukah	YB Dato Hajjah Hanifah Hajar Taib	GPS (PBB)
