= Dalet, Myanmar =

Dalet Dalat
- Location in Burma
- Coordinates: 19°59′15″N 93°50′32″E
- Country: Myanmar
- Division: Rakhine State
- District: Kyaukpyu
- Township: Ann Township
- Time zone: UTC+6.30 (MST)

Dalet (Burmese: ဒလက်မြို့), or Dalat, is a small town in Ann Township, Kyaukpyu District, in northern Rakhine State in the westernmost part of Myanmar. It is northwest of Ann on the Ann – Minbya highway. Dalet is located on the Dalet River (Dalet Chaung).
