= List of Malaysian State Assembly Representatives (1990–1995) =

Subnational legislature representatives

List of Malaysian State Assembly Representatives (1986–1990)
List of Malaysian State Assembly Representatives (1990–1995)
List of Malaysian State Assembly Representatives (1995–1999)

The following are the members of the Dewan Undangan Negeri or state assemblies, elected in the 1990 state election and by-elections. Also included is the list of the Sarawak state assembly members who were elected in 1991.

== Perlis ==
No.	State Constituency	Member	Party
BN 14
N01	Titi Tinggi	Loh Yoon Foo	BN (MCA)
N02	Beseri	Nordin Abdullah	BN (UMNO)
N03	Oran	Yazid Mat	BN (UMNO)
N04	Padang Pauh	Bahari Taib	BN (UMNO)
N05	Bintong	Md Isa Sabu	BN (UMNO)
N06	Sena	Selamat Saad	BN (UMNO)
N07	Indera Kayangan	Khor Lian Tee	BN (MCA)
N08	Kuala Perlis	Abd Karim @ Ibrahim Mat Salleh	BN (UMNO)
N09	Kayang	Ramlah @ Che Ah Long	BN (UMNO)
N10	Utan Aji	Fadzil Mahmood	BN (UMNO)
N11	Kota Raja	Abdul Hamid Pawanteh	BN (UMNO)
N12	Guar Sanji	Abdul Aziz Saad	BN (UMNO)
N13	Kurong Anai	Tengku Aziz Tengku Jaafar	BN (UMNO)
N14	Sanglang	Kamarudin Ahmad	BN (UMNO)

== Kedah ==
No.	State Constituency	Member	Party
BN 26 | DAP 1 | PAS 1
N01	Langkawi	Abu Bakar Taib	BN (UMNO)
N02	Jerlun	Khalid Ahmad from 19 December 1991	BN (UMNO)
N02	Jerlun	Yusuf Abd. Rahman until 18 November 1991	BN (UMNO)
N03	Tunjang	Hanafi Ramli	BN (UMNO)
N04	Jitra	Osman @ Mohd Daud Aroff	BN (UMNO)
N05	Kuala Nerang	Awang Ahmad Sulaiman	BN (UMNO)
N06	Pokok Sena	Ghazali Ibrahim	BN (UMNO)
N07	Langgar	Syeikh Alias Mustafa	BN (UMNO)
N08	Derga	Abdul Rahman Ibrahim	BN (UMNO)
N09	Alor Merah	Azizan Taib	BN (UMNO)
N10	Kota Darul Aman	George John	GR (DAP)
N11	Alor Janggus	Zakaria Said	BN (UMNO)
N12	Pengkalan Kundor	Syed Razak Syed Zain Barakbah	BN (UMNO)
N13	Bukit Raya	Fadzil Noor	APU (PAS)
N14	Ayer Puteh	Fatimah Ismail	BN (UMNO)
N15	Sala	Ahmad Awang	BN (UMNO)
N16	Yan	Abdullah Lebai Ismail	BN (UMNO)
N17	Gurun	Beh Heng Seong	BN (MCA)
N18	Tanjong Dawai	Rokiah Hashim	BN (UMNO)
N19	Jeneri	Wan Azmi Ariffin	BN (UMNO)
N20	Bukit Selambau	Badri Yunus	BN (UMNO)
N21	Bayu	Mohd Sibi Ahmad from 4 May 1991	BN (UMNO)
N21	Bayu	Seroji Haron until 31 March 1991	BN (UMNO)
N22	Kupang	Zainol Md Isa	BN (UMNO)
N23	Pantai Merdeka	Jamaludin Yusof	BN (UMNO)
N24	Tikam Batu	Fu Chun Yeen	BN (Gerakan)
N25	Lunas	S. Subramaniam	BN (MIC)
N26	Merbau Pulas	Mahmud Md Zain	BN (UMNO)
N27	Kulim	Yong Pau Chak	BN (MCA)
N28	Bandar Baharu	Husain Abd. Rahman	BN (UMNO)

== Kelantan ==
No.	State Constituency	Member	Party
PAS 24 | S46 14 | BERJASA 1
N01	Geting	Nik Man Nik Mohammad	APU (S46)
N02	Sungai Pinang	Mahmud Yaakub from 24 August 1991	APU (S46)
N02	Sungai Pinang	Nordin Salleh until 1991	APU (S46)
N02	Sungai Pinang	Nordin Salleh until 1991	BN (UMNO)
N03	Wakaf Bharu	Ramli Abu Bakar	APU (PAS)
N04	Semut Api	Nik Abdul Aziz Nik Mat	APU (PAS)
N05	Kemumin	Daud Ibrahim	APU (PAS)
N06	Banggol	Abdul Halim Abdul Rahman	APU (PAS)
N07	Padang Garong	Wan Hashim Wan Ahmad	APU (BERJASA)
N08	Bunut Payong	Halim Mohamad	APU (PAS)
N09	Lundang	Mohamad Daud from 29 March 1994	APU (PAS)
N09	Lundang	Mawardi Ahmad until 1994	APU (PAS)
N10	Tendong	Zainuddin @ Fadhil Mohamad Nor	APU (S46)
N11	Pengkalan Pasir	Hassan Abdullah	APU (PAS)
N12	Meranti	Zakaria Ismail	APU (PAS)
N13	Gual Periok	Nik Mustapha Nik Loding	APU (S46)
N14	Bukit Tuku	Hussin Ibrahim	APU (PAS)
N15	Chetok	Ab. Rahman Musa	APU (PAS)
N16	Salor	Ahmad Rusli Iberahim	APU (S46)
N17	Mulong	Mohamed Shukri Ab. Rahman	APU (PAS)
N18	Peringat	Mohamed Daud	APU (PAS)
N19	Tawang	Idris Ahmad	APU (PAS)
N20	Perupok	Omar Mohammed	APU (PAS)
N21	Jelawat	Mohd Daud Ja'afar	APU (S46)
N22	Cherang Ruku	Othman Wahab	APU (PAS)
N23	Limbongan	Samat Mamat from 24 August 1991	APU (S46)
N23	Limbongan	Wan Mohd Najib Wan Mohamad until 1991	APU (S46)
N23	Limbongan	Wan Mohd Najib Wan Mohamad until 1991	BN (UMNO)
N24	Gaal	Mohammad Husain	APU (PAS)
N25	Selising	Che Bisi Hassan	APU (PAS)
N26	Ketereh	Mat Yusoff	APU (PAS)
N27	Pulai Chondong	Mohamad Noor Ahmad	APU (S46)
N28	Bukit Panau	Mat Yusoff Mat Sah	APU (PAS)
N29	Panglima Bayu	Zianon Abidin Ali	APU (S46)
N30	Jeli	Mohd Yusoff Ludin	APU (PAS)
N31	Gual Ipoh	Tengku Alang Tengku Sulong	APU (S46)
N32	Labok	Wan Husin	APU (PAS)
N33	Banggol Judah	Yahya Othman	APU (PAS)
N34	Temangan	Kelthum Ahmed	APU (S46)
N35	Guchil	Wan Hasan Wan Yusof	APU (PAS)
N36	Manek Urai	Ismail Yaacob	APU (PAS)
N37	Dabong	Mohd Rozali Isohak	APU (S46)
N38	Paloh	Nozula Mat Diah	APU (S46)
N39	Galas	Omar Mohamed	APU (S46)

== Terengganu ==
No.	State Constituency	Member	Party
BN 22 | PAS 8 | S46 2
N01	Kuala Besut	Wan Zakaria Wan Abd. Rahman	BN (UMNO)
N02	Kampung Raja	Mohd Noor Hussin from 13 October 1993	BN (UMNO)
N02	Kampung Raja	Abdullah Muhammad until 15 September 1993	BN (UMNO)
N03	Jertih	Abdul Latif Mohamad	APU (PAS)
N04	Hulu Besut	Daud Abu Bakar	BN (UMNO)
N05	Jabi	Zahari Muhammad	APU (PAS)
N06	Permaisuri	Shafi'i Omar	BN (UMNO)
N07	Langkap	Mamat Ghazalee Abd Rahman	BN (UMNO)
N08	Batu Rakit	Abdul Wahab Ngah	BN (UMNO)
N09	Tepuh	Wahab Said	BN (UMNO)
N10	Teluk Pasu	Abdul Rahman Muhamad	BN (UMNO)
N11	Seberang Takir	Abdul Rashid Ngah	BN (UMNO)
N12	Bukit Tunggal	Adam @ Mansor Ali	APU (S46)
N13	Bandar	Harun Jusoh	APU (PAS)
N14	Ladang	Abu Bakar Daud	BN (UMNO)
N15	Batu Buruk	Wan Abd Muttalib @ Wan Musa Embong	APU (PAS)
N16	Wakaf Mempelam	Mohd Abdul Wahid Endut	APU (PAS)
N17	Serada	Yusof @ Jusoh Musa	BN (UMNO)
N18	Bukit Payung	Mazlan Awang from 21 April 1992	BN (UMNO)
N18	Bukit Payung	Baharudin Mohd until 1992	APU (PAS)
N19	Ru Rendang	Abdul Hadi Awang	APU (PAS)
N20	Binjai	Muda Mamat	BN (UMNO)
N21	Telemung	Ahmad Sidi Ismail	BN (UMNO)
N22	Manir	Harun Taib	APU (PAS)
N23	Kuala Berang	Wan Muda Mohamed	BN (UMNO)
N24	Tanggul	Tengku Ibrahim Sultan Ismail	APU (S46)
N25	Mercang	Harun Ali	BN (UMNO)
N26	Jerangau	Muda Abdullah	BN (UMNO)
N27	Sura	Ibrahim Awang	BN (UMNO)
N28	Paka	Engku Bijaya Sura Syed Omar	BN (UMNO)
N29	Kemasik	Mohamad @ Abu Bakar Ali	BN (UMNO)
N30	Kijal	Ahmad Said	BN (UMNO)
N31	Cukai	Wan Mokhtar Ahmad	BN (UMNO)
N32	Bukit Bandi	Harun Hasan	BN (UMNO)

== Penang ==
No.	State Constituency	Member	Party
BN 19 | DAP 14
N01	Penaga	Azhar Ibrahim	BN (UMNO)
N02	Bertam	Abdul Rahman Abbas	BN (UMNO)
N03	Pinang Tunggal	Yahaya Abdul Hamid	BN (UMNO)
N04	Ara Rendang	Zakaria Bakar	BN (UMNO)
N05	Sungai Dua	Mohammed Yusof Abdul Latib @ Latiff	BN (UMNO)
N06	Telok Ayer Tawar	Rokiah Bee Hassan	BN (UMNO)
N07	Bagan Jermal	Phee Boon Poh	GR (DAP)
N08	Mak Mandin	Lim Hock Seng	GR (DAP)
N09	Prai	V. Muthusamy from 27 July 1991	BN (MIC)
N09	Prai	Asamaley Sinniah until 1991	GR (DAP)
N10	Seberang Jaya	Ibrahim Saad	BN (UMNO)
N11	Permatang Pasir	Adnan Ramli	BN (UMNO)
N12	Penanti	Ahmad Saad	BN (UMNO)
N13	Berapit	Wong Hang Yoke	GR (DAP)
N14	Machang Bubok	Goik Hock Lai	BN (Gerakan)
N15	Bukit Tengah	Chian Heng Kai	GR (DAP)
N16	Sungai Bakap	Goh Cheng Teik	BN (Gerakan)
N17	Jawi	Chin Kooi Thoon	GR (DAP)
N18	Sungai Acheh	Ibrahim Yaakob	BN (UMNO)
N19	Tanjong Bunga	Koh Tsu Koon	BN (Gerakan)
N20	Ayer Itam	Ong Hock Aun	GR (DAP)
N21	Kebun Bunga	Teng Hock Nan	BN (Gerakan)
N22	Padang Kota	Lim Kit Siang	GR (DAP)
N23	Pengkalan Kota	Chow Kon Yeow	GR (DAP)
N24	Kampong Kolam	Cheah Teik Hoe	GR (DAP)
N25	Datok Keramat	K. Balasundaram	GR (DAP)
N26	Sungai Pinang	Kang Chin Seng	BN (Gerakan)
N27	Batu Lancang	Tan Loo Jit	GR (DAP)
N28	Bukit Gelugor	Peter Paul Dason	GR (DAP)
N29	Paya Terubong	Teoh Teik Huat	GR (DAP)
N30	Batu Uban	Kee Phaik Cheen	BN (Gerakan)
N31	Telok Bahang	Hilmi Yahaya	BN (UMNO)
N32	Telok Kumbar	Mohd Zain Omar	BN (UMNO)
N33	Bayan Lepas	Lim Chien Aun	BN (Gerakan)

== Perak ==
No.	State Constituency	Member	Party
BN 33 | DAP 13
N01	Temengor	Wan Abdullah Wan Im	BN (UMNO)
N02	Kenering	Johan Lahamat	BN (UMNO)
N03	Selama	Md. Kassim Mahmud	BN (UMNO)
N04	Batu Kurau	Raja Ahmad Zainuddin Raja Omar	BN (UMNO)
N05	Titi Serong	Mohd Taib Hanafiah	BN (UMNO)
N06	Kuala Kurau	Ahmad Shariffudin A Aziz	BN (UMNO)
N07	Alor Pongsu	Mohamed Abas	BN (UMNO)
N08	Gunong Semanggol	Samsudin Man	BN (UMNO)
N09	Sapetang	Au How Cheong	BN (Gerakan)
N10	Changkat Jering	Razlan Abdul Hamid	BN (UMNO)
N11	Kamunting	Zulkifli Hussein	BN (UMNO)
N12	Asam Kumbang	Lim Yan Chiow	GR (DAP)
N13	Lenggong	Talha Ismail	BN (UMNO)
N14	Lubok Merbau	Jamal Nasir Rasdi	BN (UMNO)
N15	Lintang	Mohamad Padil Harun	BN (UMNO)
N16	Jalong	Ngoi Thiam Woh	GR (DAP)
N17	Chemor	Mohamad Tahiruddin Mohd Tahir	BN (UMNO)
N18	Sungai Rokam	Mazidah Zakaria	BN (UMNO)
N19	Dermawan	Mohamad Asri Othman	GR (DAP)
N20	Tebing Tinggi	Choo Sing Chye	GR (DAP)
N21	Tasek	Lau Dak Kee	GR (DAP)
N22	Sungai Pari	Chen Tiam Seong	GR (DAP)
N23	Falim	Lok Swee Chin	GR (DAP)
N24	Lahat	Fadzlan Yahya	GR (DAP)
N25	Bukit Chandan	Megat Tajuddin Megat Ahmad	BN (UMNO)
N26	Batu Hampar	Mohamad Ali Abdullah	BN (UMNO)
N27	Pengkalan Baharu	Hamdi Abu Bakar	BN (UMNO)
N28	Pantai Remis	Ngo Tick Wong	GR (DAP)
N29	Belanja	Zainab Ibrahim	BN (UMNO)
N30	Bota	Ahamed Hambal Yeop Majlis	BN (UMNO)
N31	Teja	R. K. Muthu	GR (DAP)
N32	Chenderong	Song Yong Pheow	BN (MCA)
N33	Malim Nawar	Choo Kiang Seong	GR (DAP)
N34	Tanjong Tualang	Lee Chee Leong	BN (MCA)
N35	Chenderiang	Ong Ka Chuan	BN (MCA)
N36	Ayer Kuning	Azman Mahalan	BN (UMNO)
N37	Sungai Manik	Mohamed Pakri @ Mohamed Nazri A Rahim	BN (UMNO)
N38	Kampong Gajah	Ramli Ngah Talib	BN (UMNO)
N39	Pangkor	Mohamad Wajdi Ishak	BN (UMNO)
N40	Sitiawan	Hu Chan You	GR (DAP)
N41	Rungkup	Abdullah Ahmad	BN (UMNO)
N42	Hutan Melintang	Rajoo Govindasamy	BN (MIC)
N43	Pasir Bedamar	Jimmy Loh Jee Mee	GR (DAP)
N44	Changkat Jong	Mohd Arshad Abdullah	BN (UMNO)
N45	Sungkai	Veerasingam Suppiah	BN (MIC)
N46	Slim	Junus Wahid	BN (UMNO)

== Pahang ==
No.	State Constituency	Member	Party
BN 31 | DAP 1 | S46 1
N01	Tanah Rata	Law Kee Long	BN (MCA)
N02	Jelai	Abdullah Sulaiman	BN (UMNO)
N03	Bukit Betung	Omar Othman	BN (UMNO)
N04	Ceka	Abu Dahari Osman	BN (UMNO)
N05	Benta	Mohamed Zuki Kamaluddin	BN (UMNO)
N06	Batu Talam	Syed Ali Syed Ahmad from 28 August 1993	BN (UMNO)
N06	Batu Talam	Mohamed Mazlan Idris until 1993	BN (UMNO)
N07	Teras	Biaw Nga @ Liaw Per Lou	BN (MCA)
N08	Dong	Abd. Rahman Yeop Sendiri	BN (UMNO)
N09	Tahan	Ahmad Bazain Mohmud	BN (UMNO)
N10	Tembeling	Rahimah Mohammad Rawi	BN (UMNO)
N11	Pulau Tawar	Abu Bakar Hassan	APU (S46)
N12	Sungai Lembing	Ibrahim Mohd Taib	BN (UMNO)
N13	Beserah	Mohamed Yusof Mohamed Ali	BN (UMNO)
N14	Teruntum	Kan Tong Leong	BN (MCA)
N15	Paya Besar	Mohamed Noor Abu Bakar	BN (UMNO)
N16	Kuala Pahang	Abdul Manaf Abdullah	BN (UMNO)
N17	Peramu	Abdul Jabar Ibrahim	BN (UMNO)
N18	Luit	Ayub Teh	BN (UMNO)
N19	Bukit Tajau	Mohd Khalil Yaakob	BN (UMNO)
N20	Jengka	Zainal Hassan	BN (UMNO)
N21	Cenur	Tan Mohd Aminuddin Ishak	BN (UMNO)
N22	Jenderak	Abdullah Kia	BN (UMNO)
N23	Sanggang	R. Sinnathamby	BN (MIC)
N24	Lancang	Bahari Yahaya	BN (UMNO)
N25	Bilut	Fu Ah Kaw @ Poo Yew Choy	BN (MCA)
N26	Karak	Loke Koon Kam	BN (Gerakan)
N27	Pelangai	Adnan Yaakob	BN (UMNO)
N28	Semantan	Mohd Sarit Yusoh	BN (UMNO)
N29	Teriang	Leong Ngah Ngah	GR (DAP)
N30	Bera	Abdul Aziz Abdul Rahman	BN (UMNO)
N31	Cini	Wan Mohamad Razali Wan Mahusin	BN (UMNO)
N32	Bukit Ibam	Hasan Arifin	BN (UMNO)
N33	Tioman	Mustafar Abu Bakar	BN (UMNO)

== Selangor ==
No.	State constituency	Member	Party
BN 35 | DAP 6 | S46 1
N01	Sungai Air Tawar	Zainal Dahlan	BN (UMNO)
N02	Sabak	Raja Ideris Raja Ahmad	BN (UMNO)
N03	Sungai Besar	Husin Taib	BN (UMNO)
N04	Sungai Panjang	Mohd Pauzi Abdul Murad	BN (UMNO)
N05	Sekinchan	Sim Keng Seik	BN (MCA)
N06	Sungai Burung	Aziz Mohd Desa	BN (UMNO)
N07	Kelompang	Ramli Abd. Rahman	BN (UMNO)
N08	Kuala Kubu Baharu	Wong Ah Taih	BN (MCA)
N09	Batang Kali	Muhammad Muhammad Taib	BN (UMNO)
N10	Sungai Tinggi	Yusoff Hassan	BN (UMNO)
N11	Permatang	Jamaluddin Adnan	BN (UMNO)
N12	Seri Cahaya	Sivalingam Arumugam Karuppiah	BN (MIC)
N13	Jeram	Miskon Sutero	BN (UMNO)
N14	Sementa	Abd Rahman Palil from 5 February 1994	BN (UMNO)
N14	Sementa	Abdul Samat Harun until 9 January 1994	BN (UMNO)
N15	Selat Klang	Onn Ismail	BN (UMNO)
N16	Rawang	Tang See Hang	BN (MCA)
N17	Gombak Setia	Ahmad Bhari Abd Rahman	BN (UMNO)
N18	Paya Jaras	Saidin Tamby	BN (UMNO)
N19	Hulu Kelang	Fuad Hassan	BN (UMNO)
N20	Keramat	Mufti Suib	BN (UMNO)
N21	Pandan	Mad Aris Mad Yusof	BN (UMNO)
N22	Dusun Tua	Zainal Abidin Ahmad	BN (UMNO)
N23	Semenyih	Shoib Md. Silin	BN (UMNO)
N24	Kajang	Tan Seng Giaw	GR (DAP)
N25	Damansara Utama	M. Madhavan Nair	GR (DAP)
N26	Taman Aman	Oon Hong Geok	GR (DAP)
N27	Kelana Jaya	Megat Najmuddin Megat Khas	BN (UMNO)
N28	Bukit Gasing	Teong Shyan Chyuan	GR (DAP)
N29	Lindungan	Zahar Hashim	BN (UMNO)
N30	Serdang	Yap Pian Hon	BN (MCA)
N31	Subang	Abu Sujak Mahmud	BN (UMNO)
N32	Batu Tiga	Mohd Zain Sulaiman	BN (UMNO)
N33	Shahbandar Raya	S. S. Rajagopal from 28 May 1994	BN (MIC)
N33	Shahbandar Raya	T. M. Thurai until 31 March 1994	BN (MIC)
N34	Klang Bandar	Chua Kow Eng	GR (DAP)
N35	Teluk Gadung	Chew Kim Swee	GR (DAP)
N36	Pandamaran	Tai Chang Eng @ Teh Chang Ying	BN (MCA)
N37	Panglima Garang	Tarikh Mohd. Jonid	APU (S46)
N38	Morib	Abu Bakar Abdul Hamid	BN (UMNO)
N39	Banting	Fatimah Suhaimi	BN (UMNO)
N40	Dengkil	M. Sellathevan	BN (MIC)
N41	Sungai Pelik	Ng Soon Por @ Ng Ah Hock	BN (MCA)
N42	Batu Laut	Sairon Abdul Hamid	BN (UMNO)

== Negeri Sembilan ==
No.	State constituency	Member	Party
BN 24 | DAP 4
N01	Peradong	Lai Teo Kuan	GR (DAP)
N02	Klawang	Shamsul Bahari @ Ramli Mat	BN (UMNO)
N03	Pertang	Sharif Wahid	BN (UMNO)
N04	Sungai Lui	Anuar Rasidin @ Rashidin	BN (UMNO)
N05	Serting	Ibrahim Ali	BN (UMNO)
N06	Batu Kikir	Lilah Yasin	BN (UMNO)
N07	Bahau	Wong Zee Nyok	GR (DAP)
N08	Palong	Baharudin Hassan	BN (UMNO)
N09	Gemas	Mohd Yassin Bakar	BN (UMNO)
N10	Gemencheh	Waad Mansor	BN (UMNO)
N11	Repah	Lay Chun Tai @ Loy Chee Tai	BN (MCA)
N12	Kota	Ahmad Apandi Johan	BN (UMNO)
N13	Juasseh	Mohamad Ahmad	BN (UMNO)
N14	Johol	Darus Salim Bulin	BN (UMNO)
N15	Pilah	Abu Zahar Ujang	BN (UMNO)
N16	Seri Menanti	Mohd Mokhtar Mohd Yasin	BN (UMNO)
N17	Lenggeng	Hon Choon Kim	BN (MCA)
N18	Ampangan	Dermataksiah Abdul Jalil	BN (UMNO)
N19	Rahang	Lee Yuen Fong	GR (DAP)
N20	Sungai Ujong	Goh Siow Huat	BN (MCA)
N21	Labu	Shahardin Hashim	BN (UMNO)
N22	Mambau	Chan Kok Wah	GR (DAP)
N23	Jimah	Yeow Chai Thiam	BN (MCA)
N24	Rantau	Muthu Palaniappan	BN (MIC)
N25	Chembong	Mahzan Hamzah	BN (UMNO)
N26	Linggi	Mohd Isa Abdul Samad	BN (UMNO)
N27	Si Rusa	Krishnan @ Krishnasamy Muthurajoo	BN (MIC)
N28	Pasir Panjang	Mustapha Manap	BN (UMNO)

== Malacca ==
No.	State constituency	Member	Party
BN 17 | DAP 3
N01	Kuala Linggi	Ibrahim Durum	BN (UMNO)
N02	Sungai Bahru	Mohd Ali Abd Majid	BN (UMNO)
N03	Masjid Tanah	Abdul Rahim Thamby Chik	BN (UMNO)
N04	Kelemak	Mohd Zin Abdul Ghani	BN (UMNO)
N05	Pulau Sebang	Poh Ah Tiam	BN (MCA)
N06	Kemuning	Sahar Arpan	BN (UMNO)
N07	Tebong	Arunasalam Narayanan	BN (MIC)
N08	Bukit Asahan	Jenah Sarip	BN (UMNO)
N09	Ayer Molek	As'ari Ibrahim	BN (UMNO)
N10	Krubong	Seah Kwi Tong	BN (MCA)
N11	Tanjong Minyak	Yasin Mohd Sarif	BN (UMNO)
N12	Sungai Udang	Mohd Ali Rustam	BN (UMNO)
N13	Tranquerah	Sim Tong Him	DAP
N14	Kubu	Chong Tat Cheong	DAP
N15	Durian Daun	Yew Kok Kee	DAP
N16	Bandar Hilir	Gan Boon Leong	BN (MCA)
N17	Serkam	Mohd. Salleh Md. Ali from 14 December 1991	BN (UMNO)
N17	Serkam	Arifin Baba until 1991	BN (UMNO)
N18	Ayer Panas	Lim Soo Kiang	BN (MCA)
N19	Rim	Jaafar Lajis	BN (UMNO)
N20	Sungai Rambai	Abu Zahar Ithnin	BN (UMNO)

== Johor ==
No.	State constituency	Member	Party
BN 32 | DAP 3 | S46 1
N01	Sepinang	Othman Jais	BN (UMNO)
N02	Jementah	Wong Peng Sheng	GR (DAP)
N03	Tangkak	Yap Chik Dong	BN (MCA)
N04	Serom	Hashim Ismail	BN (UMNO)
N05	Bukit Serampang	Muhyiddin Yassin	BN (UMNO)
N06	Jorak	Sabariah Ahmad	BN (UMNO)
N07	Tenang	Bahari Haron	BN (UMNO)
N08	Bekok	Pang Hok Liong	GR (DAP)
N09	Endau	Ishak Awang	BN (UMNO)
N10	Tenggaroh	Singgatore Achotan	BN (MIC)
N11	Paloh	Hoo Seong Chang	BN (MCA)
N12	Gunung Lambak	Ng Kim Lai	BN (MCA)
N13	Sri Medan	Atikah Abdullah	BN (UMNO)
N14	Semerah	Tan Teck Poh @ Tan Ah Too	BN (MCA)
N15	Bukit Naning	Masiran Elias	BN (UMNO)
N16	Maharani	John Lim Wan Show	GR (DAP)
N17	Parit Bakar	Abd. Kahar Ahmad	APU (S46)
N18	Parit Jawa	Muntaha Kailan	BN (UMNO)
N19	Parit Yaani	Mohamad Aziz	BN (UMNO)
N20	Parit Raja	Zahar Bachik	BN (UMNO)
N21	Penggaram	Chua Soi Lek	BN (MCA)
N22	Rengit	Zainal Abidin Mohamed Zin	BN (UMNO)
N23	Simpang Renggam	Law Boon King @ Jimmy Low Boon Hong	BN (MCA)
N24	Benut	Khatijah Md Som	BN (UMNO)
N25	Kulai	Khoo Che Wat	BN (Gerakan)
N26	Bandar Tenggara	Adam Abdul Hamid	BN (UMNO)
N27	Sedili	Mohamadon Abu Bakar	BN (UMNO)
N28	Pengerang	Hasmoni Salim	BN (UMNO)
N29	Tiram	Ali Hassan	BN (UMNO)
N30	Pasir Gudang	K. S. Balakrishan	BN (MIC)
N31	Tanjong Puteri	Mohamad Kasbi	BN (UMNO)
N32	Gertak Merah	Freddie Lonh Hoo Min @ Long Ah Mui	BN (MCA)
N33	Tambatan	Abdul Kadir Annuar	BN (UMNO)
N34	Gelang Patah	Teu Si @ Chang See Ten	BN (MCA)
N35	Pulai Sebatang	Nasir Safar	BN (UMNO)
N36	Kukup	Ahmad Abdullah	BN (UMNO)

== Sabah ==
=== 1990–1994 ===
No.	State constituency	Member	Party
PBS 36 | USNO 12
N01	Banggi	Amir Kahar Mustapha	BN (USNO)
N02	Kudat	Wong Phin Chung	GR (PBS)
N03	Bengkoka	Paul Tom Imbayan	GR (PBS)
N04	Matunggong	Mathius Majihi	GR (PBS)
N05	Tandek	Saibul Supu	GR (PBS)
N06	Langkon	Bugie Galadam	GR (PBS)
N07	Tempasuk	Robert Ripin Minggir	GR (PBS)
N08	Usukan	Mustapha Harun recontest, won on 11 May 1991	BN (USNO)
N08	Usukan	Mustapha Harun recontest, won on 11 May 1991	BN (UMNO)
N09	Kadamaian	Banggai Basirun	GR (PBS)
N10	Tamparuli	Wilfred Bumburing	GR (PBS)
N11	Sulaman	Hajiji Noor	BN (USNO)
N12	Kiulu	Gisin Lombut	GR (PBS)
N13	Kundasang	Ewon Ebin	GR (PBS)
N14	Ranau	Siringan Gubat	GR (PBS)
N15	Sugut	Jublee Zen	GR (PBS)
N16	Labuk	Tan Yung Hi @ Tan Yong Gee	GR (PBS)
N17	Sungai Sibuga	Thien Fui Yun	GR (PBS)
N18	Elopura	Tham Nyip Shen	GR (PBS)
N19	Tanjong Papat	Tan Kit Sher	GR (PBS)
N20	Karamunting	Lau Pui Keong	GR (PBS)
N21	Sekong	Pitting Mohd Ali	BN (USNO)
N22	Sukau	Aklee Abass	BN (USNO)
N23	Kuamut	Joseph Sitin Saang	GR (PBS)
N24	Tambunan	Joseph Pairin Kitingan	GR (PBS)
N25	Bingkor	Lawrence Gimbang	GR (PBS)
N26	Moyog	Bernard Giluk Dompok	GR (PBS)
N27	Inanam	Stephen Kinson Kutai @ Joni Bilingan	GR (PBS)
N28	Likas	Yong Teck Lee	GR (PBS)
N29	Api-Api	Chau Tet On	GR (PBS)
N30	Sembulan	Peter Chong On Tet	GR (PBS)
N31	Petagas	James Ligunjang	GR (PBS)
N32	Kawang	Ariah Tengku Ahmad	GR (PBS)
N33	Buang Sayang	Cladius Sundang Alex	GR (PBS)
N34	Bongawan	Karim Bujang	BN (USNO)
N35	Kuala Penyu	Wences Anggang	GR (PBS)
N36	Klias	Lajim Ukin	GR (PBS)
N37	Lumadan	Dayang Mahani Pengiran Ahmad Raffae	BN (USNO)
N38	Sipitang	Jamilah Sulaiman from 8 December 1990	GR (PBS)
N38	Sipitang	Jawawi Isa until 1990	GR (PBS)
N39	Tenom	Kadoh Agundong	GR (PBS)
N40	Kemabong	Esar Andamas	GR (PBS)
N41	Sook	Joseph Kurup	GR (PBS)
N42	Nabawan	Adut Sigoh @ Joe Said Besar	GR (PBS)
N43	Merotai	Mohd Said Senang	BN (USNO)
N44	Sri Tanjong	Michael Lim Sun Yang	GR (PBS)
N45	Lahad Datu	Askalanai Abdul Rahim	BN (USNO)
N46	Kunak	Salim Bachu	BN (USNO)
N47	Balung	Ismail Jook	BN (USNO)
N48	Sulabayan	Nasir Sakaran from 8 December 1990	BN (USNO)
N48	Sulabayan	Sakaran Dandai until 1990	BN (USNO)

== Sarawak ==
=== 1991–1996 ===
No.	State constituency	Member	Party
BN 49 | PBDS 7
N01	Tanjong Datu	Ramsay Noel Jitam	BN (SUPP)
N02	Tasik Biru	Patau Rubis	BN (SNAP)
N03	Pantai Damai	Sharifah Mordiah Tuanku Fauzi	BN (PBB)
N04	Sejingkat	Abang Draup Zamahari Abang Zen	BN (PBB)
N05	Tupong	Daud Abdul Rahman	BN (PBB)
N06	Satok	Abang Abdul Rahman Zohari Abang Openg	BN (PBB)
N07	Padungan	Song Swee Guan	BN (SUPP)
N08	Pending	Sim Kheng Hui	BN (SUPP)
N09	Batu Lintang	Chan Seng Khai	BN (SUPP)
N10	Batu Kawah	Alfred Yap Chin Loi from 22 August 1992	BN (SUPP)
N10	Batu Kawah	Chong Kiun Kong until 1992	BN (SUPP)
N11	Bengoh	William Tanyuh Nub	BN (SUPP)
N12	Asajaya	Abdul Taib Mahmud	BN (PBB)
N13	Muara Tuang	Adenan Satem	BN (PBB)
N14	Tarat	Frederick Bayoi Manggie	BN (PBB)
N15	Tebedu	Michael Ben Panggi	BN (PBB)
N16	Semera	Wan Abdul Wahab Wan Sanusi	BN (PBB)
N17	Simunjan	Mohd. Naroden Majais	BN (PBB)
N18	Sebuyau	Julaihi Narawi	BN (PBB)
N19	Beladin	Bolhassan Di	BN (PBB)
N20	Bukit Begunan	Daniel Tajem Miri	PBDS
N21	Simanggang	Michael Pilo Gangga	BN (SUPP)
N22	Engkilili	Toh Heng San	BN (SUPP)
N23	Batang Ai	Dublin Unting Ingkot	PBDS
N24	Saribas	Wahbi Junaidi	BN (PBB)
N25	Layar	Alfred Jabu Numpang	BN (PBB)
N26	Kalaka	Abdul Wahab Aziz	BN (PBB)
N27	Krian	Peter Nyarok Entrie	BN (SNAP)
N28	Belawai	Hamden Ahmad	BN (PBB)
N29	Serdeng	Mohamad Asfia Awang Nassar	BN (PBB)
N30	Matu-Daro	Abdul Wahab Dolah	BN (PBB)
N31	Meradong	Thomas Hii King Hiong	BN (SUPP)
N32	Repok	David Teng Lung Chi	BN (SUPP)
N33	Pakan	William Mawan Ikom	BN (SNAP)
N34	Meluan	Geman Itam	BN (SNAP)
N35	Ngemah	Gabriel Adit Demong	PBDS
N36	Machan	Gramong Juna	BN (PBB)
N37	Dudong	Soon Choon Teck	BN (SUPP)
N38	Bukit Assek	Wong Soon Kai	BN (SUPP)
N39	Bawang Assan	Wong Soon Koh	BN (SUPP)
N40	Seduan	Ting Ing Mieng	BN (SUPP)
N41	Dalat	Mohd Effendi Norwawi	BN (PBB)
N42	Balingian	Abdul Ajis Abdul Majeed	BN (PBB)
N43	Tamin	Joseph Entulu Belaun	PBDS
N44	Kakus	John Sikie Tayai	PBDS
N45	Pelagus	Sng Chee Hua	PBDS
N46	Katibas	Ambrose Blikau Enturan	BN (PBB)
N47	Baleh	James Jemut Masing	PBDS
N48	Belaga	Nyipa Kilah @ Nyipa Bato	BN (SUPP)
N49	Kemena	Celestine Ujang Jilan	BN (PBB)
N50	Kidurong	Michael Sim	BN (SUPP)
N51	Lambir	Usop Wahab	BN (PBB)
N52	Piasau	George Chan Hong Nam	BN (SUPP)
N53	Marudi	Edward Jeli Belayong	BN (SNAP)
N54	Telang Usan	Joseph Balan Seling	BN (PBB)
N55	Limbang	James Wong Kim Min	BN (SNAP)
N56	Lawas	Awang Tengah Ali Hasan	BN (PBB)
