= List of Malaysian State Assembly Representatives (1986–1990) =

Subnational legislature representatives

List of Malaysian State Assembly Representatives (1982–1986)
List of Malaysian State Assembly Representatives (1986–1990)
List of Malaysian State Assembly Representatives (1990–1995)

The following are the members of the Dewan Undangan Negeri or state assemblies, elected in the 1986 state election and by-elections. Also included is the list of the Sarawak state assembly members who were elected in 1987.

== Perlis ==
No.	State Constituency	Member	Party
BN 14
N01	Titi Tinggi	Lai Kuan Fook	BN (MCA)
N02	Beseri	Nordin Abdullah	BN (UMNO)
N03	Oran	Yazid Mat	BN (UMNO)
N04	Padang Pauh	Bahari Taib	BN (UMNO)
N05	Bintong	Md Isa Sabu	BN (UMNO)
N06	Sena	Selamat Saad	BN (UMNO)
N07	Indera Kayangan	Lee Kim Cheng	BN (MCA)
N08	Kuala Perlis	Ahmad Osman	BN (UMNO)
N09	Kayang	Talib Ali	BN (UMNO)
N10	Utan Aji	Fadzil Mahmood	BN (UMNO)
N11	Kota Raja	Abdul Hamid Pawanteh	BN (UMNO)
N12	Guar Sanji	Taib Ismail	BN (UMNO)
N13	Kurong Anai	Tengku Aziz Tengku Jaafar	BN (UMNO)
N14	Sanglang	Kamarudin Ahmad	BN (UMNO)

== Kedah ==
No.	State Constituency	Member	Party
BN 25 | PAS 3
N01	Langkawi	Ismail Ya'acob	BN (UMNO)
N02	Jerlun	Yusuf Abd. Rahman	BN (UMNO)
N03	Tunjang	Hanafi Ramli	BN (UMNO)
N04	Jitra	Osman @ Mohd Daud Aroff	BN (UMNO)
N05	Kuala Nerang	Abdul Rashid Sulaiman	BN (UMNO)
N06	Pokok Sena	Ghazali Ibrahim	BN (UMNO)
N07	Langgar	Sheikh Mohamad Abdullah	PAS
N08	Derga	Abdul Rahman Ibrahim	BN (UMNO)
N09	Alor Merah	Azizan Taib	BN (UMNO)
N10	Kota Darul Aman	Cheah Chong Chiew	BN (MCA)
N11	Alor Janggus	Zakaria Said	BN (UMNO)
N12	Pengkalan Kundor	Syed Razak Syed Zain Barakbah	BN (UMNO)
N13	Bukit Raya	Fadzil Noor	PAS
N14	Ayer Puteh	Fatimah Ismail	BN (UMNO)
N15	Sala	Azahari Razak	PAS
N16	Yan	Abdullah Lebai Ismail	BN (UMNO)
N17	Gurun	Sang Chok Seong	BN (MCA)
N18	Tanjong Dawai	Rokiah Hashim	BN (UMNO)
N19	Jeneri	Wan Azmi Ariffin	BN (UMNO)
N20	Bukit Selambau	Badri Yunus	BN (UMNO)
N21	Bayu	Seroji Haron	BN (UMNO)
N22	Kupang	Zainol Md Isa	BN (UMNO)
N23	Pantai Merdeka	Shuaib Lazim from 24 March 1990	BN (UMNO)
N23	Pantai Merdeka	Ghazali Bakar until 1990	BN (UMNO)
N24	Tikam Batu	Ong Chow Song	BN (Gerakan)
N25	Lunas	S. Subramaniam	BN (MIC)
N26	Merbau Pulas	Mahmud Md Zain	BN (UMNO)
N27	Kulim	Yong Pau Chak	BN (MCA)
N28	Bandar Baharu	Abdul Majid Itam	BN (UMNO)

== Kelantan ==
No.	State Constituency	Member	Party
BN 29 | PAS 10
N01	Geting	Mat Nawi Mat Jusoh	BN (UMNO)
N02	Sungai Pinang	Mansor Salleh	BN (UMNO)
N03	Wakaf Bharu	Hussin Mahmood	BN (UMNO)
N04	Semut Api	Nik Abdul Aziz Nik Mat	PAS
N05	Kemumin	Daud Ibrahim	PAS
N06	Banggol	Abdul Halim Abdul Rahman	PAS
N07	Padang Garong	Lim Jit Keng	BN (MCA)
N08	Bunut Payong	Ahmad Rastom Ahmad Maher	BN (UMNO)
N09	Lundang	Mawardi Ahmad	PAS
N10	Tendong	Ismail Che Mat	BN (UMNO)
N11	Pengkalan Pasir	Hassan Ismail	BN (UMNO)
N12	Meranti	Zaid Fadzil	BN (HAMIM)
N13	Gual Periok	Abdul Rahman Awang	BN (UMNO)
N14	Bukit Tuku	Mohamed Zain Ismail from 28 June 1987	BN (UMNO)
N14	Bukit Tuku	Zakaria Botok until 26 May 1987	BN (UMNO)
N15	Chetok	Hassan Mohamed	BN (HAMIM)
N16	Salor	Zaleha Hussin	BN (UMNO)
N17	Mulong	Mustapha Ibrahim	PAS
N18	Peringat	Annuar Musa	BN (UMNO)
N19	Tawang	Idris Ahmad	PAS
N20	Perupok	Omar Mohammed	PAS
N21	Jelawat	Zainuddin Awang Hamat	BN (UMNO)
N22	Cherang Ruku	Jailani Jaafar	BN (UMNO)
N23	Limbongan	Raja Mahmud Raja Mamat	BN (UMNO)
N24	Gaal	Daud Yusoff	BN (UMNO)
N25	Selising	Wan Mohammad Wan Abu Bakar	BN (UMNO)
N26	Ketereh	Ariffin Mahmood	BN (UMNO)
N27	Pulai Chondong	Abdullah Mohamed	BN (UMNO)
N28	Bukit Panau	Ab Latif Ab Rahman	BN (UMNO)
N29	Panglima Bayu	Mohamed Yaacob	BN (UMNO)
N30	Jeli	Abdul Samad Drahman	BN (UMNO)
N31	Gual Ipoh	Mustafa Yaakub	BN (UMNO)
N32	Labok	Wan Husin	PAS
N33	Banggol Judah	Ismail Mamat	BN (UMNO)
N34	Temangan	Salleh Che Harun	BN (UMNO)
N35	Guchil	Wan Hasan Wan Yusof	PAS
N36	Manek Urai	Ismail Yaacob	PAS
N37	Dabong	Mohd Razali Ishak	BN (UMNO)
N38	Paloh	Ariffin Said	BN (UMNO)
N39	Galas	Zakaria Hasan	BN (UMNO)

== Terengganu ==
No.	State Constituency	Member	Party
BN 30 | PAS 2
N01	Kuala Besut	Wan Zakaria Wan Abd. Rahman	BN (UMNO)
N02	Kampung Raja	Abdullah Muhammad	BN (UMNO)
N03	Jertih	Abdul Majid Mohamed @ Ahmad	BN (UMNO)
N04	Hulu Besut	Daud Abu Bakar	BN (UMNO)
N05	Jabi	Hassan Said	BN (UMNO)
N06	Permaisuri	Tg Mahmud Mansor	BN (UMNO)
N07	Langkap	Mamat Ghazalee Abd Rahman	BN (UMNO)
N08	Batu Rakit	Wan Ibrahim Wan Othman	BN (UMNO)
N09	Tepuh	Abdul Rashid Muhammad	BN (UMNO)
N10	Teluk Pasu	Harun Taib from 24 June 1989	PAS
N10	Teluk Pasu	Ismail Yusof until 1989	BN (UMNO)
N11	Seberang Takir	Abdul Rashid Ngah	BN (UMNO)
N12	Bukit Tunggal	Ghazali Endut	BN (UMNO)
N13	Bandar	Tok Teng Sai	BN (MCA)
N14	Ladang	Abu Bakar Daud	BN (UMNO)
N15	Batu Buruk	Abdul Muttalib Salleh	BN (UMNO)
N16	Wakaf Mempelam	Mustafa @ Hassan Ali	PAS
N17	Serada	Yusof @ Jusoh Musa	BN (UMNO)
N18	Bukit Payung	Mazlan Awang	BN (UMNO)
N19	Ru Rendang	Abdul Hadi Awang	PAS
N20	Binjai	Muda Mamat	BN (UMNO)
N21	Telemung	Ahmad Sidi Ismail	BN (UMNO)
N22	Manir	Awang Abu Bakar Sulong	BN (UMNO)
N23	Kuala Berang	Wan Muda Mohamed	BN (UMNO)
N24	Tanggul	Mustafa Muda	BN (UMNO)
N25	Mercang	Harun Ali	BN (UMNO)
N26	Jerangau	Muda Abdullah	BN (UMNO)
N27	Sura	Abdul Aziz @ Ibrahim Awang	BN (UMNO)
N28	Paka	Engku Bijaya Sura Syed Omar Mohamed	BN (UMNO)
N29	Kemasik	Mohamad @ Abu Bakar Ali	BN (UMNO)
N30	Kijal	Ahmad Said from 1 August 1990	BN (UMNO)
N30	Kijal	Mohamad Md Min until 5 June 1990	BN (UMNO)
N31	Cukai	Wan Mokhtar Ahmad	BN (UMNO)
N32	Bukit Bandi	Harun Hasan	BN (UMNO)

== Penang ==
No.	State Constituency	Member	Party
BN 23 | DAP 10
N01	Penaga	Abd. Razak Ismail	BN (UMNO)
N02	Bertam	Abdul Rahman Abbas	BN (UMNO)
N03	Pinang Tunggal	Yahaya Abdul Hamid	BN (UMNO)
N04	Ara Rendang	Zakaria Bakar	BN (UMNO)
N05	Sungai Dua	Mohd Shariff Omar	BN (UMNO)
N06	Telok Ayer Tawar	Abd Ro'ni A. Hasan	BN (UMNO)
N07	Bagan Jermal	Lim Hock Seng	DAP
N08	Mak Mandin	Sak Cheng Lum	BN (MCA)
N09	Prai	N. Shanmugam	DAP
N10	Seberang Jaya	Ibrahim Saad	BN (UMNO)
N11	Permatang Pasir	Adnan Ramli	BN (UMNO)
N12	Penanti	Yahaya Jamaluddin	BN (UMNO)
N13	Berapit	Chian Heng Kai	DAP
N14	Machang Bubok	Goik Hock Lai	BN (Gerakan)
N15	Bukit Tengah	Liang Thau Sang	BN (Gerakan)
N16	Sungai Bakap	Lim Boon Sho	BN (Gerakan)
N17	Jawi	Chin Kooi Thoon	DAP
N18	Sungai Acheh	Ragayah Ariff	BN (UMNO)
N19	Tanjong Bunga	Khoo Boo Yeang	BN (Gerakan)
N20	Ayer Itam	Gooi Hock Seng	DAP
N21	Kebun Bunga	Peter Huang	DAP
N22	Padang Kota	Lim Chong Eu	BN (Gerakan)
N23	Pengkalan Kota	Teoh Teik Huat	DAP
N24	Kampong Kolam	Lim Kit Siang	DAP
N25	Datok Keramat	Ooi Ean Kwong	BN (Gerakan)
N26	Sungai Pinang	Khoo Kay Por	BN (Gerakan)
N27	Batu Lancang	Tan Loo Jit	DAP
N28	Bukit Gelugor	Karpal Singh	DAP
N29	Paya Terubong	Chin Nyok Soo	BN (MCA)
N30	Batu Uban	Kee Phaik Cheen	BN (Gerakan)
N31	Telok Bahang	Yahaya Ahmad	BN (UMNO)
N32	Telok Kumbar	Mohd Zain Omar	BN (UMNO)
N33	Bayan Lepas	Boey Weng Keat	BN (Gerakan)

== Perak ==
No.	State Constituency	Member	Party
BN 33 | DAP 13
N01	Temengor	Wan Abdullah Wan Im	BN (UMNO)
N02	Kenering	Johan Lahamat	BN (UMNO)
N03	Selama	Md. Kassim Mahmud	BN (UMNO)
N04	Batu Kurau	Abdul Manan Mohd Ali	BN (UMNO)
N05	Titi Serong	Mohd Taib Hanafiah	BN (UMNO)
N06	Kuala Kurau	Ahmad Shariffudin A Aziz	BN (UMNO)
N07	Alor Pongsu	Mohamed Abas	BN (UMNO)
N08	Gunong Semanggol	Samsudin Man	BN (UMNO)
N09	Sapetang	Au How Cheong	BN (Gerakan)
N10	Changkat Jering	Razlan Abdul Hamid	BN (UMNO)
N11	Kamunting	Zulkifli Hussein	BN (UMNO)
N12	Asam Kumbang	Kong Cheok Seng	DAP
N13	Lenggong	Umar Ismail	BN (UMNO)
N14	Lubok Merbau	Hamzah Mohd Zain	BN (UMNO)
N15	Lintang	Meor Osman Imam Pinawa @ Panjang Mohd	BN (UMNO)
N16	Jalong	Liew Sam Fong	DAP
N17	Chemor	Yusof Ariffin	BN (UMNO)
N18	Sungai Rokam	Paramjit Singh Tara Singh	BN (PPP)
N19	Dermawan	Lau Dak Kee	DAP
N20	Tebing Tinggi	Foo Tiew @ Foo Piew Kok	DAP
N21	Tasek	Chin Sow Key	DAP
N22	Sungai Pari	P. Patto	DAP
N23	Falim	Lok Swee Chin	DAP
N24	Lahat	Lee Kak Hoi	DAP
N25	Bukit Chandan	Megat Tajuddin Megat Ahmad	BN (UMNO)
N26	Batu Hampar	Mohamad Ali Abdullah	BN (UMNO)
N27	Pengkalan Baharu	Abdul Malek	BN (UMNO)
N28	Pantai Remis	Yu Yang Kien	DAP
N29	Belanja	Zainab Ibrahim	BN (UMNO)
N30	Bota	Ahamed Hambal Yeop Majlis	BN (UMNO)
N31	Teja	Loh Boon Eng	BN (MCA)
N32	Chenderong	Song Yong Pheow	BN (MCA)
N33	Malim Nawar	Choo Kiang Seong	DAP
N34	Tanjong Tualang	Ngan Siong Hing @ Ngan Siong Eng	DAP
N35	Chenderiang	Ong Ka Chuan	BN (MCA)
N36	Ayer Kuning	Azman Mahalan	BN (UMNO)
N37	Sungai Manik	Mohamed Pakri @ Mohamed Nazri A Rahim	BN (UMNO)
N38	Kampong Gajah	Ramli Ngah Talib	BN (UMNO)
N39	Pangkor	Rajasegaran Samy Nathan	BN (MIC)
N40	Sitiawan	Chen Lim Tiow	DAP
N41	Rungkup	Yahya Zakaria	BN (UMNO)
N42	Hutan Melintang	Radziah Marahudin	BN (UMNO)
N43	Pasir Bedamar	Fadzlan Yahya	DAP
N44	Changkat Jong	Mohd Arshad Abdullah	BN (UMNO)
N45	Sungkai	Kumaran Karunagaran	BN (MIC)
N46	Slim	Junus Wahid	BN (UMNO)

== Pahang ==
No.	State Constituency	Member	Party
BN 32 | DAP 1
N01	Tanah Rata	Chan Kong Choy	BN (MCA)
N02	Jelai	Abdullah Sulaiman	BN (UMNO)
N03	Bukit Betung	Omar Othman	BN (UMNO)
N04	Ceka	Abu Dahari Osman	BN (UMNO)
N05	Benta	Mohamed Zuki Kamaluddin	BN (UMNO)
N06	Batu Talam	Mohamed Mazlan Idris	BN (UMNO)
N07	Teras	Lip Tuck Chee	DAP
N08	Dong	Abd. Rahman Yeop Sendiri	BN (UMNO)
N09	Tahan	Ahmad Bazain Mohmud	BN (UMNO)
N10	Tembeling	Kamariah Mat Noh	BN (UMNO)
N11	Pulau Tawar	Ho Chock Keong	BN (MCA)
N12	Sungai Lembing	Wan Abdullah Wan Osman	BN (UMNO)
N13	Beserah	Mohamed Yusof Mohamed Ali	BN (UMNO)
N14	Teruntum	Kan Tong Leong from 12 August 1989	BN (MCA)
N14	Teruntum	Lim Ah Lek until 1989	BN (MCA)
N15	Paya Besar	Mohamed Noor Abu Bakar	BN (UMNO)
N16	Kuala Pahang	Abdul Manaf Abdullah	BN (UMNO)
N17	Peramu	Abdul Rahim Hitam	BN (UMNO)
N18	Luit	Ayub Teh	BN (UMNO)
N19	Bukit Tajau	Mohd Khalil Yaakob	BN (UMNO)
N20	Jengka	Zainal Hassan	BN (UMNO)
N21	Cenur	Mahmud Mat Taib	BN (UMNO)
N22	Jenderak	Abdullah Kia	BN (UMNO)
N23	Sanggang	Abd Halim Mohd Seh	BN (UMNO)
N24	Lancang	V. V. Aboo	BN (MIC)
N25	Bilut	Fu Ah Kaw @ Poo Yew Choy	BN (MCA)
N26	Karak	Loke Koon Kam	BN (Gerakan)
N27	Pelangai	Adnan Yaakob	BN (UMNO)
N28	Semantan	Abdullah Mohamed	BN (UMNO)
N29	Teriang	Mok San Hong	BN (MCA)
N30	Bera	Abdul Aziz Abdul Rahman	BN (UMNO)
N31	Cini	Wan Mohamad Razali Wan Mahusin	BN (UMNO)
N32	Bukit Ibam	Abdul Jabbar Ibrahim	BN (UMNO)
N33	Tioman	Hasan Arifin	BN (UMNO)

== Selangor ==
No.	State constituency	Member	Party
BN 37 | DAP 5
N01	Sungai Air Tawar	Zainal Dahlan	BN (UMNO)
N02	Sabak	Mohamad Yusof Abdul Latif	BN (UMNO)
N03	Sungai Besar	Mahbud Hashim from 1 November 1989	BN (UMNO)
N03	Sungai Besar	Abu Samah Nordin until 4 October 1989	BN (UMNO)
N04	Sungai Panjang	Ariffin Mat Rawi	BN (UMNO)
N05	Sekinchan	Sim Keng Seik	BN (MCA)
N06	Sungai Burung	Abdul Shukur Siraj	BN (UMNO)
N07	Kelompang	Ramli Abd. Rahman	BN (UMNO)
N08	Kuala Kubu Baharu	Wong Ah Taih	BN (MCA)
N09	Batang Kali	Muhammad Muhammad Taib	BN (UMNO)
N10	Sungai Tinggi	Yusoff Hassan	BN (UMNO)
N11	Permatang	Khalid Ahmad	BN (UMNO)
N12	Seri Cahaya	M. Mahalingam	BN (MIC)
N13	Jeram	Miskon Sutero	BN (UMNO)
N14	Sementa	Md Amin Abd Moin	BN (UMNO)
N15	Selat Klang	Onn Ismail	BN (UMNO)
N16	Rawang	Tang See Hang	BN (MCA)
N17	Gombak Setia	Kaharudin Momin	BN (UMNO)
N18	Paya Jaras	Saidin Tamby	BN (UMNO)
N19	Hulu Kelang	Rakibah Abdul Manap	BN (UMNO)
N20	Keramat	Mufti Suib	BN (UMNO)
N21	Pandan	Mohd Fahmi Ibrahim	BN (UMNO)
N22	Dusun Tua	Mohamed Azmir Mohamed Nazir	BN (UMNO)
N23	Semenyih	Abdul Jalil Mohd. Nazir	BN (UMNO)
N24	Kajang	Chan Kok Kit	DAP
N25	Damansara Utama	M. Madhavan Nair	DAP
N26	Taman Aman	Oon Hong Geok	DAP
N27	Kelana Jaya	Megat Najmuddin Megat Khas	BN (UMNO)
N28	Bukit Gasing	Tai Sin Piaw	DAP
N29	Lindungan	Mazlan Harun	BN (UMNO)
N30	Serdang	Yap Pian Hon	BN (MCA)
N31	Subang	Abu Sujak Mahmud	BN (UMNO)
N32	Batu Tiga	Mohd Zain Sulaiman	BN (UMNO)
N33	Shahbandar Raya	M. Sellathevan	BN (MIC)
N34	Klang Bandar	Tan Seng Giaw	DAP
N35	Teluk Gadung	Tong Yoke Seng	BN (MCA)
N36	Pandamaran	Ng Thian Hock	BN (MCA)
N37	Panglima Garang	Eng Hoi Choo	BN (MCA)
N38	Morib	Abu Bakar Abdul Hamid	BN (UMNO)
N39	Banting	Fatimah Suhaimi	BN (UMNO)
N40	Dengkil	T. M. Thurai	BN (MIC)
N41	Sungai Pelik	Ng Soon Por @ Ng Ah Hock	BN (MCA)
N42	Batu Laut	Sairon Abdul Hamid	BN (UMNO)

== Negeri Sembilan ==
No.	State constituency	Member	Party
BN 24 | DAP 4
N01	Peradong	Wong See Wah	BN (MCA)
N02	Klawang	Shamsul Bahari @ Ramli Mat	BN (UMNO)
N03	Pertang	Abd Kadir Kassim	BN (UMNO)
N04	Sungai Lui	Abdul Muhes @ Abd Muhi Abd Wahab	BN (UMNO)
N05	Serting	Ibrahim Ali	BN (UMNO)
N06	Batu Kikir	Lilah Yasin	BN (UMNO)
N07	Bahau	Loh Ming Chai	DAP
N08	Palong	Baharudin Hassan	BN (UMNO)
N09	Gemas	Mohd Yassin Bakar	BN (UMNO)
N10	Gemencheh	Waad Mansor	BN (UMNO)
N11	Repah	Lay Chun Tai @ Loy Chee Tai	BN (MCA)
N12	Kota	Ahmad Apandi Johan	BN (UMNO)
N13	Juasseh	Mohamad Ahmad	BN (UMNO)
N14	Johol	Darus Salim Bulin	BN (UMNO)
N15	Pilah	Abu Zahar Ujang	BN (UMNO)
N16	Seri Menanti	Ramli Ujang	BN (UMNO)
N17	Lenggeng	Hon Choon Kim	BN (MCA)
N18	Ampangan	Khatimah Ibrahim	BN (UMNO)
N19	Rahang	Lee Yuen Fong	DAP
N20	Sungai Ujong	Oh Her Sang	BN (MCA)
N21	Labu	Shahardin Hashim	BN (UMNO)
N22	Mambau	Ho Sepang	DAP
N23	Jimah	M. Kuppusamy	DAP
N24	Rantau	Muthu Palaniappan	BN (MIC)
N25	Chembong	Mahzan Hamzah	BN (UMNO)
N26	Linggi	Mohd Isa Abdul Samad	BN (UMNO)
N27	Si Rusa	Krishnan @ Krishnasamy Muthurajoo	BN (MIC)
N28	Pasir Panjang	Mustapha Manap	BN (UMNO)

== Malacca ==
No.	State constituency	Member	Party
BN 17 | DAP 3
N01	Kuala Linggi	Ibrahim Durum from 29 July 1990	BN (UMNO)
N01	Kuala Linggi	Bahari Hasan until 1990	BN (UMNO)
N02	Sungai Bahru	Mohd Ali Abd Majid	BN (UMNO)
N03	Masjid Tanah	Abdul Rahim Thamby Chik	BN (UMNO)
N04	Kelemak	Mohd Zin Abdul Ghani	BN (UMNO)
N05	Pulau Sebang	Poh Ah Tiam	BN (MCA)
N06	Kemuning	Ahmad Abdullah	BN (UMNO)
N07	Tebong	Arunasalam Narayanan	BN (MIC)
N08	Bukit Asahan	Jenah Sarip	BN (UMNO)
N09	Ayer Molek	Mohd Ali Rustam	BN (UMNO)
N10	Krubong	Seah Kwi Tong	BN (MCA)
N11	Tanjong Minyak	Yasin Mohd Sarif	BN (UMNO)
N12	Sungai Udang	Ahmad Nordin Md Amin	BN (UMNO)
N13	Tranquerah	Sim Tong Him	DAP
N14	Kubu	Yau Jiok Hua @ Yau Siok Sua	DAP
N15	Durian Daun	Kerk Kim Hock	DAP
N16	Bandar Hilir	Gan Boon Leong	BN (MCA)
N17	Serkam	Arifin Baba	BN (UMNO)
N18	Ayer Panas	Lim Soo Kiang	BN (MCA)
N19	Rim	Jaafar Lajis	BN (UMNO)
N20	Sungai Rambai	Abu Zahar Ithnin	BN (UMNO)

== Johor ==
No.	State constituency	Member	Party
BN 35 | DAP 1
N01	Sepinang	Othman Jais	BN (UMNO)
N02	Jementah	Lim Si Cheng	BN (MCA)
N03	Tangkak	Yap Chik Dong	BN (MCA)
N04	Serom	Md Noor Md Dom	BN (UMNO)
N05	Bukit Serampang	Muhyiddin Yassin	BN (UMNO)
N06	Jorak	*Sabariah Ahmad	BN (UMNO)
N07	Tenang	Bahari Haron	BN (UMNO)
N08	Bekok	Tay Boon Chong	BN (MCA)
N09	Endau	Khadri Sabran	BN (UMNO)
N10	Tenggaroh	Arumugam Chettiar Verru Chettiar	BN (MIC)
N11	Paloh	Pang Tong Yong	BN (MCA)
N12	Gunung Lambak	Kang Chow Oh	BN (MCA)
N13	Sri Medan	Kamisan Asari	BN (UMNO)
N14	Semerah	Cheang Lu Kiang	BN (MCA)
N15	Bukit Naning	Hashim Rais	BN (UMNO)
N16	Maharani	Song Sing Kwee	DAP
N17	Parit Bakar	Musa Ismail	BN (UMNO)
N18	Parit Jawa	Zakaria Mahadi	BN (UMNO)
N19	Parit Yaani	Mohamad Aziz	BN (UMNO)
N20	Parit Raja	Mohd. Yasin Kamari from 20 October 1988	BN (UMNO)
N20	Parit Raja	Syed Zain Edros Al-Shahab until 1988	BN (UMNO)
N21	Penggaram	Chua Soi Lek	BN (MCA)
N22	Rengit	Abu Bakar Mohd Dewa	BN (UMNO)
N23	Simpang Renggam	Law Boon King @ Jimmy Low Boon Hong	BN (MCA)
N24	Benut	Ahmad Selamat	BN (UMNO)
N25	Kulai	Khoo Che Wat	BN (Gerakan)
N26	Bandar Tenggara	Adam Abdul Hamid	BN (UMNO)
N27	Sedili	Tosrin Jarvanthi	BN (UMNO)
N28	Pengerang	Hasmoni Salim	BN (UMNO)
N29	Tiram	Ali Hassan	BN (UMNO)
N30	Pasir Gudang	K. S. Balakrishan	BN (MIC)
N31	Tanjong Puteri	Md Yunos Sulaiman recontest, won on 5 March 1988	BN (UMNO)
N32	Gertak Merah	Freddie Long Hoo Hin @ Long Ah Mui	BN (MCA)
N33	Tambatan	A. Kadir Annuar from 5 August 1989	BN (UMNO)
N33	Tambatan	Mahmood Daud until 1989	BN (UMNO)
N34	Gelang Patah	Chew Kong Huat	BN (MCA)
N35	Pulai Sebatang	Khatijah Md Som	BN (UMNO)
N36	Kukup	*Ahmad Abdullah	BN (UMNO)

== Sabah ==
No.	State constituency	Member	Party
PBS 34 | USNO 12 | BERJAYA 1 | PCBS 1
N01	Banggi	Amir Kahar Mustapha	USNO
N02	Kudat	Wong Phin Chung	PBS
N03	Bengkoka	Yussof Abd Manan	USNO
N04	Matunggong	Mathius Majihi	PBS
N05	Tandek	Saibul Supu	PBS
N06	Langkon	Bugie Galadam	PBS
N07	Tempasuk	Robert Ripin Minggir	PBS
N08	Usukan	Mustapha Harun from 18 April 1987	USNO
N08	Usukan	Abdul Hamid Mustapha until 1987	USNO
N09	Kadamaian	Banggai Basirun	PBS
N10	Tamparuli	Wilfred Bumburing	PBS
N11	Sulaman	Jasni Gindug from 30 November 1986	PBS
N11	Sulaman	Osu Sukam until 1986	USNO
N12	Kiulu	Gisin Lombut	PBS
N13	Kundasang	Ewon Ebin	PBS
N14	Ranau	Siringan Gubat from 9 December 1989	PBS
N14	Ranau	Mark Koding until 1989	PBS
N14	Ranau	Mark Koding until 1989	AKAR
N15	Sugut	Jublee Zen	PBS
N16	Labuk	Tan Yung Hi @ Tan Yong Gee	PBS
N17	Sungai Sibuga	Tan Kun Boo	PBS
N18	Elopura	Tham Nyip Shen	PBS
N19	Tanjong Papat	Tan Kit Sher	PBS
N20	Karamunting	Lau Pui Keong	PBS
N21	Sekong	Salleh Janan	USNO
N22	Sukau	Zaki Gusmiah	USNO
N23	Kuamut	Joseph Sitin Saang	PBS
N24	Tambunan	Joseph Pairin Kitingan	PBS
N25	Bingkor	Stephen R. Evans	PBS
N26	Moyog	Bernard Giluk Dompok	PBS
N27	Inanam	Stephen Kinson Kutai @ Joni Bilingan	PBS
N28	Likas	Yong Teck Lee	PBS
N29	Api-Api	Chau Tet On	PBS
N30	Sembulan	Peter Chong On Tet	PBS
N31	Petagas	James Andrew Vitales	PBS
N32	Kawang	Irene Daphne Pritchard @ Ariah Ahmad	PBS
N33	Buang Sayang	Mohammad Noor Mansoor	BERJAYA
N34	Bongawan	Abdul Ghani Bidin from 19 September 1987	PBS
N34	Bongawan	Abd Karim Abdul Ghani until 1987	USNO
N35	Kuala Penyu	Wences Anggang	PBS
N36	Klias	Lajim Ukin	PBS
N37	Lumadan	Dayang Mahani Pengiran Ahmad Raffae	USNO
N38	Sipitang	Jawawi Isa	USNO
N39	Tenom	Kadoh Agundong	PBS
N40	Kemabong	Limun Laikim	PBS
N41	Sook	Joseph Kurup	PBS
N42	Nabawan	Adut Sigoh @ Joe Said Besar	PBS
N43	Merotai	Mohd Said Senang	USNO
N44	Sri Tanjong	Ku Hien Liong	PCBS
N45	Lahad Datu	Mohammadin Ketapi	PBS
N46	Kunak	Salim Bachu	USNO
N47	Balung	Ahmad Bahrom Abu Bakar Titingan	PBS
N48	Sulabayan	Sakaran Dandai	USNO

== Sarawak ==
=== 1987–1991 ===
No.	State constituency	Member	Party
BN 28 | PBDS 15 | PERMAS 5
N01	Lundu	Ramsay Noel Jitam	BN (SUPP)
N02	Tasik Biru	Patau Rubis	BN (SNAP)
N03	Padungan	Song Swee Guan	BN (SUPP)
N04	Stampin	Sim Kheng Hong	BN (SUPP)
N05	Petra Jaya	Sharifah Mordiah Tuanku Fauzi	BN (PBB)
N06	Satok	Abang Abdul Rahman Zohari Abang Openg	BN (PBB)
N07	Sebandi	Abdul Taib Mahmud	BN (PBB)
N08	Muara Tuang	Adenan Satem	BN (PBB)
N09	Batu Kawah	Chong Kiun Kong	BN (SUPP)
N10	Bengoh	Sora Rusah	MAJU (PBDS)
N11	Tarat	Frederick Bayoi Manggie	BN (PBB)
N12	Tebakang	Michael Ben Panggi	MAJU (PBDS)
N13	Semera	Wan Abdul Wahab Wan Sanusi	BN (PBB)
N14	Gedong	Mohammad Tawan Abdullah @ Hilary Tawan Masan	MAJU (PERMAS)
N15	Lingga	Donald Lawan	BN (SNAP)
N16	Sri Aman	Michael Pilo Gangga	BN (SUPP)
N17	Engkilili	Sung Cho Nang @ Sim Choo Nam	MAJU (PBDS)
N18	Batang Ai	Mikai Mandau	MAJU (PBDS)
N19	Saribas	Bolhassan Di	BN (PBB)
N20	Layar	Alfred Jabu Numpang	BN (PBB)
N21	Kalaka	Abang Yusuf Puteh	MAJU (PERMAS)
N22	Krian	Edmund Langgu Saga	MAJU (PBDS)
N23	Kuala Rajang	Hamden Ahmad	BN (PBB)
N24	Matu-Daro	Abdul Wahab Dolah	BN (PBB)
N25	Repok	David Teng Lung Chi	BN (SUPP)
N26	Meradong	Thomas Hii King Hiong	BN (SUPP)
N27	Maling	Wong Soon Kai	BN (SUPP)
N28	Seduan	Ting Ing Mieng	BN (SUPP)
N29	Igan	David Tiong Chiong Chu	MAJU (PERMAS)
N30	Dudong	Jawan Empaling	BN (SUPP)
N31	Balingian	Abdul Ajis Abdul Majeed	BN (PBB)
N32	Oya	Wan Madzihi Wan Mahdzar	MAJU (PERMAS)
N33	Pakan	Jawie Wilson Masing	MAJU (PBDS)
N34	Meluan	Geman Itam	MAJU (PBDS)
N35	Machan	Gramong Juna	MAJU (PBDS)
N36	Ngemah	Joseph Kudi	MAJU (PBDS)
N37	Katibas	Felix Bantin Jibom	MAJU (PBDS)
N38	Pelagus	Phi Limon Nuing	MAJU (PBDS)
N39	Baleh	James Jemut Masing	MAJU (PBDS)
N40	Belaga	Nyipa Kilah @ Nyipa Bato	MAJU (PERMAS)
N41	Tatau	Bolhassan Kambar	MAJU (PBDS)
N42	Kemena	Celestine Ujang Jilan	BN (PBB)
N43	Subis	Salleh Jafaruddin	MAJU (PERMAS)
N44	Miri	George Chan Hong Nam	BN (SUPP)
N45	Marudi	Edward Jeli Belayong	MAJU (PBDS)
N46	Telang Usan	Joseph Balan Seling	MAJU (PBDS)
N47	Limbang	James Wong Kim Min	BN (SNAP)
N48	Lawas	Awang Tengah Ali Hasan	BN (PBB)
