= Beladin (state constituency) =

Sarawak constituency

Defunct state constituency
- Legislature: Sarawak State Legislative Assembly
- Constituency created: 1987
- Constituency abolished: 1996
- First contested: 1991
- Last contested: 1991

Beladin was a state constituency in Sarawak, Malaysia, that was represented in the Sarawak State Legislative Assembly from 1991 to 1996.

The state constituency was created in the 1987 redistribution and was mandated to return a single member to the Sarawak State Legislative Assembly under the first past the post voting system.

== History ==
It was abolished in 1996 after it was redistributed.

=== Representation history ===
Members of the Legislative Assembly for Beladin
| Assembly | No | Years | Member | Party |
Constituency created from Saribas
| 13th | N19 | 1991-1996 | Bolhassan Di @ Ahmad Di | BN (PBB) |
Constituency abolished, renamed to Beting Maro

== Election results ==
Sarawak state election, 1991
| Party | Candidate | Votes | % |
|---|---|---|---|
| BN | Bolhassan Di @ Ahmad Di | 5,062 | 81.02 |
| Independent | Abg. Mail | 1,093 | 17.49 |
| PERMAS | Mohd Farhi Bujang | 69 | 1.10 |
| NEGARA | Abg. Mentaril Unus | 24 | 0.38 |
| Total valid votes | | 6,248 | 100.00 |
| Total rejected ballots | | 70 | |
| Unreturned ballots | | 6 | |
| Turnout | | 6,324 | 77.73 |
| Registered electors | | 8,136 | |
| Majority | | 3,969 | 63.53 |
This was a new constituency created.
