= Sejingkat =

Sarawak constituency

Defunct state constituency
- Legislature: Sarawak State Legislative Assembly
- Constituency created: 1987
- Constituency abolished: 1996
- First contested: 1991
- Last contested: 1991

Sejingkat was a state constituency in Sarawak, Malaysia, that was represented in the Sarawak State Legislative Assembly from 1991 to 1996.

The state constituency was created in the 1987 redistribution and was mandated to return a single member to the Sarawak State Legislative Assembly under the first past the post voting system.

== History ==
It was abolished in 1996 after it was redistributed.

=== Representation history ===
Members of the Legislative Assembly for Sejingkat
Assembly	No	Years	Member	Party
Constituency created
13th	N04	1991-1996	Abang Draup Zamahari Abang Zen	BN (PBB)
Constituency abolished, renamed to Demak Laut

== Election results ==
Sarawak state election, 1991: Sejingkat
Party	Candidate	Votes	%
BN	Abang Draup Zamahari Abang Zen	4,381	77.46
Independent	Suhaili Hamid	1,035	18.30
Independent	Jemi Aleh	192	3.39
NEGARA	Saidan @ Nassuin Sahini	48	0.85
Total valid votes		5,656	100.00
Total rejected ballots		85	
Unreturned ballots		0	
Turnout		5,741	74.10
Registered electors		7,748	
Majority		3,346	59.16
This was a new constituency created.
