= 1987 Ming Court Affair =

Political crisis in Sarawak, Malaysia

The Ming Court Affair
- Abdul Rahman Ya'kub answering questions regarding the political crisis at Ming Court Hotel on 10 March 1987
- Date: September 1983–1991
- Location: Sarawak, Malaysia
- Caused by: Dispute between Abdul Rahman Ya'kub and Abdul Taib Mahmud; The rise of Dayak nationalism
- Goals: Removal of Abdul Taib Mahmud from the chief minister post
- Methods: Motion of no confidence against Taib Mahmud; Campaigned against Taib in 1987 and 1991 state elections
- Result: Dissolution of Sarawak State Legislative Assembly to pave the way for 1987 state election; Taib Mahmud retained his chief minister post; Dissolution of PERMAS party in 1991; Readmission of PBDS into Sarawak BN in 1994

Parties
Sarawak Barisan National (BN) consisting of: Parti Pesaka Bumiputera Bersatu (PBB); Sarawak United Peoples' Party (SUPP); Sarawak National Party (SNAP)	Maju group consisting of: Sarawak Malaysian People's Association (PERMAS); Parti Bansa Dayak Sarawak (PBDS)

Lead figures
Abdul Taib Mahmud; Dr Wong Soon Kai; James Wong	Abdul Rahman Ya'kub; Leo Moggie; Daniel Tajem

The Ming Court Affair was a political coup in Sarawak, Malaysia that began in 1983, developed into a full-blown political crisis during the 1987 state election, and ended after the Sarawak Malaysian People's Association (PERMAS) was dissolved in 1991. This political crisis mainly involved the dispute between Abdul Rahman Ya'kub (former Sarawak chief minister) and his nephew Abdul Taib Mahmud (chief minister of Sarawak) over the control of the state government and Sarawak's natural resources.

== 1983 ==
Abdul Rahman Ya'kub was the third Sarawak chief minister, ruling from 1970 to 1981. He left his chief minister post to his nephew Abdul Taib Mahmud in 1981. Abdul Rahman then proceed to assume the ceremonial post of Governor of Sarawak from 1981 to 1985. Abdul Rahman had advocated his nephew for the chief minister post but the relationship soon turned sour after two years. This was because Abdul Rahman wanted Taib to take his advice while running the state government. Rahman's loyalists in Sarawak cabinet also tried to direct the distribution of the state's natural resources and the operation of governmental agencies according to Rahman's wishes. Taib continued Rahman's governing policy and inherited the whole Sarawak cabinet intact from his uncle. However, Taib soon grew frustrated with his uncle's control. Taib slowly replaced Rahman's loyalists with his own men. This has resulted in Rahman's displeasure over Taib.

During the opening ceremony of Tanjung Kidurong port of Bintulu in September 1983, Rahman criticised the federal government for breaking its promise of building a new airport in Bintulu while Taib was trying to deliver his own speech. Taib felt embarrassed by the action of his uncle and left the stage while his uncle was still speaking. Taib later made a public apology on the incident and handed over his resignation letter to Abdul Rahman. Rahman declined the resignation of Taib because Rahman himself also handed over a resignation letter to Yang di-Pertuan Agong to vacate his governor's seat. However, Rahman was persuaded by Yang di-Pertuan Agong to stay until his term expires in April 1985.

=== 1983 PBB general assembly ===
In September 1983, triennial general assembly of Parti Pesaka Bumiputera Bersatu (PBB) was held. Taib Mahmud, who was the president of the PBB party, tried to secure his own position by not allowing the president and one of the two deputy presidents posts being contested. He allowed one deputy president seat (Bumiputera wing) to be contested but later regretted it because Taib worried that Rahman's men would win the deputy president seat, thus challenging Taib's authority in the party. Taib stopped the party elections except for lower level Supreme Council seats of the Bumiputera wing. Subsequently, a motion was tabled in the general assembly to authorise Taib to appoint a suitable deputy president for the post. Rahman's faction objected the motion. From then, Rahman's faction started to attack Taib Mahmud. Matu-Daro PBB branch, formerly headed by Abdul Rahman, tabled a motion to form Sarawak United Malays National Organisation (UMNO) by merging all the bumiputera parties including PBB to order to curb Taib's power in the party. However, federal UMNO leaders such as Musa Hitam said that Sarawak Barisan Nasional (BN) was still strong and thus there was no need of UMNO in Sarawak. However, unknown to Rahman supporters, Taib already made a secret agreement with then prime minister of Malaysia, Mahathir Mohamad that the UMNO would not enter Sarawak as long as Mahathir remains as Malaysian prime minister and Taib remains as chief minister of Sarawak. Salleh Jafaruddin (Rahman's nephew) used the General Assembly to mention that Rahman's speech during the opening of Bintulu port was actually not offensive to Taib and Taib should not respond negatively to the matter. However, he also praised Taib for making an apology to Abdul Rahman and reminded Taib he should respect the elders such as Abdul Rahman.

== 1984-1985 ==
=== PBDS and the federal government response ===
Rahman and his supporters also tried to garner the support of non-Muslim Bumiputera community especially the Dayaks by feeding them with issues of Taib's policy in marginalising the Dayak community. These issues has led to the support of Parti Bansa Dayak Sarawak (PBDS) towards Abdul Rahman. Besides, Taib Mahmud also grew uncomfortable with Leo Moggie (president of PBDS and Federal Minister of Energy, Post, and Telecommunications) intimate relationship with the then Malaysian prime minister Mahathir Mohamad. Therefore, Taib Mahmud hinted Daniel Tajem (deputy president of PBDS) to take over the president post from Leo Moggie but it fell on deaf ears. Rahman's supporters also tried to create a crack in relationship between Taib and the federal government by criticising the federal leaders for ignoring Sarawak needs:

We seldom see federal ministers coming over to visit Sarawak. Even if they do visit, they come for a couple of hours to see the LNG (Liquefied Natural Gas) project, then take another flight back to Kuala Lumpur and sit down in the federal capital telling that Sarawak has not much problem.

— Salleh Jafaruddin (Rahman's nephew), reported by Sarawak Tribune on 16 March 1984.

In response to these criticisms, the federal government announced several new projects such as the establishment of RM 400 million Universiti Pertanian Malaysia (UPM) campus in Bintulu. Taib defended the federal leaders by arguing that the prime minister has a strong sense of national integration so the federal government would not marginalise Sarawak. Taib also asked for people's patience in waiting for development projects in Sarawak.

=== Personal attacks against Taib Mahmud ===
In early 1985, Abdul Rahman wrote a personal letter to Taib Mahmud which was later copied to Malaysian prime minister Mahathir Mohamad. Rahman ended the letter with:

I venture to suggest that if you find that you are unable to change from your present thinking and ways of doing things in Sarawak, you had better make an honourable exit. Pesaka Bumiputera Bersatu (PBB) will decide who should be your successor. I don't intend to fight you. You are too small for me.

— Abdul Rahman Ya'kub, reported by Michael Leigh in 1991.

However, Mahathir refused to interfere with the matter. After Rahman stepped down from his Governor post, he was not happy with Taib's choice of new Governor Ahmad Zaidi Adruce because Ahmad Zaidi was believed to have a connection with Indonesian rebels during Indonesia–Malaysia confrontation. Rahman started to question Taib's faith in Islam by accusing Taib of practising Bomohism (a traditional Malay belief in spirits and black magic) in great detail:

Taib came to see me in 1983 and asked me what I thought would be the best time for an election. I told him it was not for me to say...but my usual practice was to seek guidance from God by praying. I told it was not for me who would face the rakyat (people), but him. Therefore, he must pray the istikharah (special prayer to request certain needs) and the best time to pray is after midnight. He could either do that or go to Mecca for a week. He heeded my advice but my relatives informed me that he took along with him a bomoh and the bomoh was also a kiai because he had the powers of an Indonesian man who had died a few hundred years ago.

— Abdul Rahman Ya'kub, reported by Sarawak Tribune on 5 April 1985.

In response to Rahman's accusation, Taib argued that nobody has the right to question his faith because only God could judge him.

=== Taib Mahmud's response ===
In response to criticisms of Abdul Rahman and his supporters, Taib Mahmud, as the president of PBB, removed Salleh Jafaruddin from his PBB's deputy secretary-general post. A Taib loyalist, Wan Madzihi Wan Mahdzar, became the new deputy secretary-general. In November 1985, Taib also suspended Wan Habib Syed Mahmud from PBB's vice-president post, Haji Balia Munir from publicity chief, and Haji A.S. Jaya from assistant-publicity chief. Adenan Satem, a Taib loyalist, became the new publicity chief.

Taib also started to reshuffle his cabinet in 1985 by creating three new ministries and abolishing two others. Taib placed the newly created Ministry of Resource Planning under him so that he could control the distribution of timber concessions. Taib retained the portfolio firmly under him until his retirement in 2014. Such power of distributing timber concessions was previously held under a Rahman loyalist named Noor Tahir. Noor Tahir was later given a less important portfolio which was Ministry of Environment and Tourism. Hafsah Harun, another Rahman loyalist, was given the portfolio of Minister of Social Development.

== 1986 ==
=== Rahman supporters' response ===
In April 1986, Salleh Jafaruddin resigned from his state assembly seat of Oya and ceased to become a member of the PBB party because he could not tolerate the leadership of Taib Mahmud any more. This was because organisers blocked him from attending special assembly of PBB Oya branch although he was the branch chairman. Saadi Olia (Kuala Rajang) and Wan Habib Syed Mahmud (Balingian) soon follow suit and resigned from the party but they kept their own state assembly seats.

Wan Habib and Saadi Olia later set up a new party named United Sarawak Natives Association (USNA) in 1986. Wan Habib became the president of the party while Salleh became the secretary-general. Salleh Jafaruddin's resignation from the state assembly seat of Oya had resulted in a by-election held on 1 and 2 July 1986. Salleh had to contest for the seat as an independent because his party cannot be registered on time. He contested against Wan Madzihi Wan Mahdzar who was the deputy secretary-general of the PBB party. Salleh subsequently lost the seat to Wan Madzihi.

=== 1986 parliamentary election ===
During the August 1986 Malaysian general election, all the Sarawak Barisan Nasional component parties were able to win all the seats contested except for SUPP. SUPP lost 2 seats (Serian and Rajang) to independents and 1 seat (Bandar Kuching) to Democratic Action Party (DAP). Sarawak National Party (SNAP) lost 4 seats to PBDS. Both SNAP and PBDS were component parties of Barisan Nasional at that time. There was only a marginal decline for the number of popular votes garnered by Sarawak BN. During the election, Simunjan and Mukah were considered hotly contested seats. Wan Habib (USNA) contested for the Simunjan seat but lost to Bujang Ulis (PBB). Salleh Jafaruddin (USNA) contested for Mukah but lost to Leo Michael Toyad (PBB). Meanwhile, Taib Mahmud won a landslide victory against an independent in Kota Samarahan. Overall, the total number of popular vote garnered by PBB in Muslim bumiputera seats decreased from 77.56% in 1982 election to 68.15% in 1986 election.

=== 1986 PBB general assembly ===
PBB general assembly was held in September 1986 soon after the parliamentary election. Taib decided that top posts would not be contested to prevent a further split in the party. However, the deputy president post was still vacant since the last party election. By this time, most of the Rahman supporters were out of the party. Taib decided to open the deputy president post for contest. Sulaiman Daud and Abang Abu Bakar contested for the seat. However, Taib openly endorsed Abu Bakar for the seat. As a result of Taib endorsement, Abang Abu Bakar won the contest, polling 370 votes against the 131 votes by Sulaiman Daud. Besides, 7 vice-president posts and 15 supreme council members were also opened for contests. Abang Johari Tun Openg received the highest number of votes, followed by Wan Madzihi Wan Mahdzar and Bujang Ulis. Adenan Satem was the only candidate who lost the race to vice-president post. Adenan was later appointed to publicity chief while his brother Zainuddin Satem was appointed to the treasurer post. Leo Michael Toyad also secured a seat in the Supreme Council.

== 1987 political crisis ==
On 9 March 1987 (Monday), four Sarawak ministers and 3 assistant ministers suddenly resigned from the Sarawak cabinet. The four ministers were Noor Tahir (PBB), Hafsah Harun (PBB), Daniel Tajem (PBDS), and Edward Jeli (SNAP) and the three assistant ministers were Gramong Juna (PBDS), Michael Ben (SNAP), and Hollis Tini (SUPP).

Edward Jeli's resented Taib for not getting timber concessions, which could service his RM 5 million loans of developing shophouses in Miri. Noor Tahir was unhappy because Taib was favouring a group of selected crony capitalists especially Foochow Chinese who monopolized contracts given by the state government. Daniel Tajem was the last key player who agreed on a coup on Taib. Tajem was officiating a farmer's organisation function at Mukah on Friday before he went back to Kuching on Saturday. He was then called by Leo Moggie (PBDS president) to meet Abdul Rahman at his home in Kuala Lumpur. During the meeting on Sunday evening, Tajem had an argument with Abdul Rahman on whether to table a formal motion of no confidence in state assembly or just hand over a letter containing state assemblymen signatures to the Governor of Sarawak. After the meeting, Tajem was given an envelope containing RM 300 for his party expenses and he resided at Shangri-La Hotel in Kuala Lumpur at the end of the day. On the Monday morning when Sarawak Tribune (owned by Abdul Rahman) made public the resignation of 7 Sarawak ministers, Tajem decided to check out from Shangri-La Hotel and check in into Ming Court Hotel, where the defectors gathered.

The 7 leaders with another 20 state assemblymen were flown to Ming Court Hotel (present day Corus Hotels) at Jalan Ampang, Kuala Lumpur accompanied by Abdul Rahman and the president of PBDS, Leo Moggie. Leo Moggie called for a party meeting at his residence in Kuala Lumpur to canvass support for the removal of Taib Mahmud. Leo Moggie stated that his party has to support Abdul Rahman or otherwise he himself will quit from the president post. Daniel Tajem supported Leo Moggie's cause. Finally, the PBDS Supreme Council went in favour of Leo Moggie.

The PBDS party has withdrawn from the Sarawak Barisan National (BN) coalition at state government level but remained with the coalition at the federal government level. They announced that they lost confidence in Taib Mahmud because "he could no longer administer the government properly and has failed to look after the interests of Bumiputera in Sarawak." The 27 state assemblymen named their group Kumpulan Maju (Progressive group). They demanded Taib to resign or otherwise Taib would face a no confidence vote in the Sarawak State Legislative Assembly. The Maju group decided to take this course of action because they fear that in an upcoming Sarawak cabinet reshuffle, Daniel Tajem would be sacked as deputy chief minister. Therefore, they have not enough time to wait and table a formal motion of no confidence against Taib in the state assembly. Tajem had criticised Taib for marginalising Dayaks before this at a PBDS Triennial General Assembly in Sibu. Besides, the rise of Dayak nationalism at that time was also ripe to topple Taib Mahmud. The Maju group also tried to lobby the prime minister of Malaysia Mahathir Mohamad into supporting the group but Mahathir was preoccupied with the hotly contested United Malays National Organisation (UMNO) party election which would later worsen into the 1988 Malaysian constitutional crisis. Mahathir would not directly support Rahman's or Taib's group because he would not want to be blamed if another non-Muslim bumiputera chief minister in Sarawak was installed after Stephen Kalong Ningkan and Tawi Sli. Daniel Tajem had a 15 minutes meeting with Mahathir to lobby the prime minister's support but Mahathir advised Daniel Tajem to keep the political crisis within Sarawak. Mahathir also stated that Maju group would be free to do what it takes to oust Taib as long as it is within the law.

However, the Sarawak United Peoples' Party (SUPP) and Sarawak National Party (SNAP) directed their support towards Taib. SUPP also started to persuade the federal government to support Taib in the crisis. This was because SUPP would not want Abdul Rahman to be back in power again because Rahman was responsible for the weakening of SUPP in 1978 by allowing Democratic Action Party (DAP) to enter Sarawak and also the policy of Islamisation adopted by Rahman during his tenure in office as chief minister. Meanwhile, for SNAP, James Wong was not in favour for Abdul Rahman because he was detained at Kamunting Detention Centre for 18 months under Internal Security Act when he was the opposition leader against Barisan Nasional in 1974 parliamentary elections. Abdul Rahman was believed to have advocated his arrest by accusing him of seceding the Limbang territory to Brunei. Taib also threatened to cancel SNAP's logging concessions if James Wong were to switched to Rahman's side.

However, Taib Mahmud had a cabinet meeting in the morning of 10 March 1987 and decided to call for a fresh election. At 11:45 am, Taib accompanied by two deputy chief ministers, Tan Sri Datuk Amar Sim Kheng Hong and Alfred Jabu anak Numpang met the Governor at the latter's office inside the state legislative assembly complex. The request to dissolve the state assembly was granted. Meanwhile, Abdul Rahman only sent Noor Tahir back to Kuching on the next day to hand over the petition to Sarawak Governor at The Astana. However, the Governor was already in Kuala Lumpur. Taib Mahmud decided to reject all the demands by Maju group. The Maju group was surprised on course of action taken by Taib because they were confident that Taib would step down. Taib appointed new ministers and assistant ministers to replace those who had defected to Maju group. Adenan Satem was appointed as Minister of Land Development while Abang Johari was appointed as Minister of Agriculture and Community Development. James Wong was also given a portfolio of Minister of Environment and Tourism to acknowledge the latter's support towards Taib.

== 1987 state elections ==
Just before the 1987 elections, Abdul Rahman registered a new party named Sarawak Malaysian People's Association (PERMAS). It accepted the former PBB members and other members who have defected from Sarawak Barisan Nasional (BN). PERMAS and PBDS contested a total of 42 out of 48 state assembly seats with each one contesting in 21 seats. Maju group presented a manifesto named "A Government for the People" which contains four major points: calling an end to the present Sarawak government, uphold the rule of law and protect Sarawak rights, restore democracy, and to ensure the ministerial power will be exercised according to the law. The Maju group nominated Noor Tahir as the new Sarawak chief minister if the group ever come to power in state elections. However, Abdul Rahman was widely believed to be the next chief minister if the Maju group succeeded in forming a new government. During the election, PERMAS attacked Taib leadership styles and his practice in money politics. Meanwhile, PBDS used Dayak nationalism to woo the votes. Abdul Rahman also revealed a list of timber companies associated to Taib on local newspapers owned by Rahman supporters. Rahman also ran a nine-series story named "Abdul Taib:The Inside Story" and exposed Taib disrespectful attitude towards him.

Taib-led Sarawak BN decided to contest all the seats in the state election. They also released a manifesto named "Continued Stability through Politics of Development". This manifesto promised a government which continues to strive for stability and development in the state, peace and harmony among the people, and to uphold the freedom of worship and cultural practices. In the election, Sarawak BN mainly campaigned on developmental promises for the voters. They also described Abdul Rahman as "power-crazy, anti-Chinese, and practiced timber politics". Sarawak BN also revealed a list of timber concessions that was awarded to Rahman and his supporters during Rahman's reign as chief minister. Sarawak BN dished out at least 48 project valued at RM 190.22 million. Most of the projects promise by Sarawak BN was considered minor projects such as building of community halls, bus shades, and village roads. A total of RM 4.21 million worth of financial grants was given to 14 social organisations in Sarawak. Unable to compete with BN style of "Politics of Development", the Maju group was defeated in the election. Taib continued to embrace this strategy throughout his tenure as chief minister after he witnessed the defeat of Maju group during this election.

After the election, Sarawak BN won 28 out of 48 seats in the state assembly. However, Sarawak BN's popularity has declined from 59.17% in 1983 to 55.24% in the current election. Taib Mahmud has won comfortably against Wan Yusof (PERMAS) at Sebandi seat. SNAP was the biggest casualty in the election. It won only 2 out of 11 seats contested. James Wong (SNAP) retained his Limbang seat by a majority of 454 votes. Meanwhile, Maju group won 20 seats (15 seats by PBDS and 5 seats by PERMAS). Abdul Rahman (PERMAS) was easily defeated by Wahab Dolah (PBB) at Matu-Daro seat with a majority of 1,625 votes. Daniel Tajem was defeated at Lingga seat by a narrow majority of 59 votes. During this election, Malaysian federal government has not interfered with the contest between Taib and Rahman and allowed the crisis to be settled through ballot box.

== Declining opposition (1987-1991) ==
After the election, Taib scrapped the deputy chief minister post which had been allocated to PBDS. He also started to terminate the services of community chiefs who were supportive of Abdul Rahman during the 1987 election and replace them with Taib loyalists. Taib also purged government officers who supported Rahman during the 1987 elections. Taib also amended the Forest Bill so that the power of granting and revoke license permits will lie solely on the Forestry Director and the Minister of Resource Planning. Amendment of the bill has tightened Taib's grip over distribution of timber licenses. Taib also introduced the Party Hopping Bill which forbids BN assemblymen from crossing over to opposition bench. Taib also used Internal Security Act (ISA) to jail critics of his regime. Deputy Home Minister Megat Junid Megat Ayub had accused the Maju group of plotting to assassinate Taib. The government had launched Operation API which detained 11 people under ISA. PERMAS members were among those who were detained under the act. Such accusation has tarnished the image of the opposition led by PERMAS and PBDS. Taib Mahmud also lured nine opposition state assemblymen (eight from PBDS and one from PERMAS) into BN's fold by promising material rewards and political appointments, thus securing BN's two-thirds majority in forming a strong government.

PERMAS continued its struggle by wresting control of the oldest Muslim-Bumiputera organisation in Sarawak, Malay National Union (MNU) which was formed on 10 October 1939. However, MNU became dormant since the formation of Parti Negara Sarawak (PANAS) and Barisan Rakyat Jati Sarawak (BARJASA) parties in 1962. Although PERMAS was able to dominate MNU eventually, it did not pose any significant threat to Taib Mahmud. PERMAS and PBDS tried to challenge Taib again during 1990 parliamentary elections and 1991 state elections although PERMAS-PBDS alliance was dissolved after 1987 elections. In 1990 parliamentary elections, Sarawak BN won 17 out of 23 parliamentary seats. PBDS remained in BN fold in the parliamentary elections but opposed BN during state elections. On the other hand, PERMAS failed to make any significant impact during the parliamentary elections.

With the waning influence of PERMAS, a new opposition party named Parti Warisan Pribumi Sarawak (WARISAN) was branched out from PERMAS in January 1991. This new party also planned to bring the national party, United Malays National Organisation (UMNO), in to Sarawak. However, Taib dismissed the attempt by WARISAN by stating that "this type of national politics is not well understood in Sarawak". Mahathir also stated there is no reason for UMNO to enter Sarawak. WARISAN subsequently failed to register as an official political party and issue of UMNO in Sarawak gradually subsided. In fact, there were a number of Sarawak Malays who had joined as UMNO members in Peninsular Malaysia. Several UMNO leaders in Sarawak claimed that there were 38,000 UMNO members in Sarawak in 1988. PBDS also tried to co-operate another Dayak party named Parti Negara Rakyat Sarawak (NEGARA) and devised "Sarawak Chief Minister Project 1992" which aimed to install a new Dayak chief minister if the group win the mandate of the voters to form a government in 1991 state elections. PBDS was optimistic in winning 22 state assembly seats during 1991 elections but it won only 7 seats. Meanwhile, PERMAS and NEGARA failed to win any seats during the state elections. On the other hand, Sarawak BN secured 49 out of 56 state assembly seats after the election.

== Aftermath ==
Realising that PERMAS and PBDS no longer mounted a powerful challenge against Taib, Abdul Rahman decided to dissolve PERMAS in 1991. In 1992, PBDS decided to rejoin Sarawak BN and was readmitted into the coalition on 1 June 1994. With the inclusion of PBDS into Sarawak BN, opposition forces in Sarawak were virtually eliminated. Sarawak BN was able to dominate subsequent elections in 1995 (parliamentary) and 1996 (state) with landslide victories.

Abdul Rahman celebrated his 80th birthday in Hilton Hotel, Kuching in 2008. During the ceremony, he hugged his nephew, Pehin Sri Abdul Taib Mahmud, marking the end of the 20-year-old strained relationship between an uncle and a nephew after the Ming Court Affair. He said that he stitched up his relationship with Taib because "blood is thicker than water".

Keruntum Sdn Bhd, a timber company that was linked to Rahman, filed a suit against Taib, Sarawak Forest Department, and the state government in 1987 for revoking 25-year timber license of the company. Keruntum's case was upheld by the High Court of Sarawak and the Malaysian federal court in 1988. However, the company's license was revoked for the second time in the same year. The company then filed another suit against Taib in 1990 and finally, on 15 March 2017, 27 years after the suit was filed, the Malaysian federal court dismissed the company's appeal as it has not justified the case adequately that Taib was "politically motivated" when cancelling the company's timber license.

In 2013, two daughters of Abdul Rahman Ya'kub claimed to have the blessings of the chief minister Abdul Taib Mahmud on the sale of 5,000 hectares of plantation lands, as recorded with a hidden camera by Global Witness. Taib refuted the allegation, stating the strained relationship between Rahman Ya'kub and him after the Ming Court Affair, thus the cousins cannot be his most trusted agent. Taib also mentioned that he never allowed anyone to be his intermediary on the sale of state land and logging license.
