= 1987 Sarawak state election =

Malaysian state legislative election

- 15–16 April 1987

All 48 seats in the Sarawak State Legislative Assembly 25 seats needed for a majority
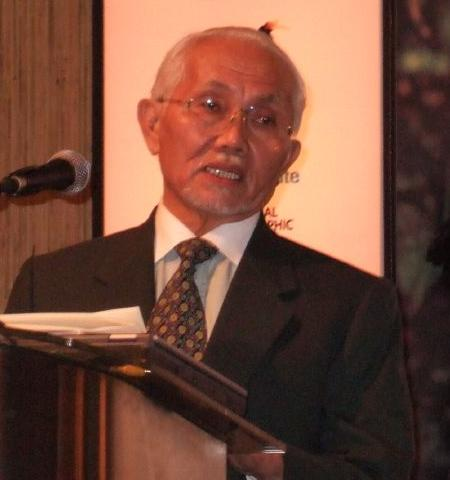

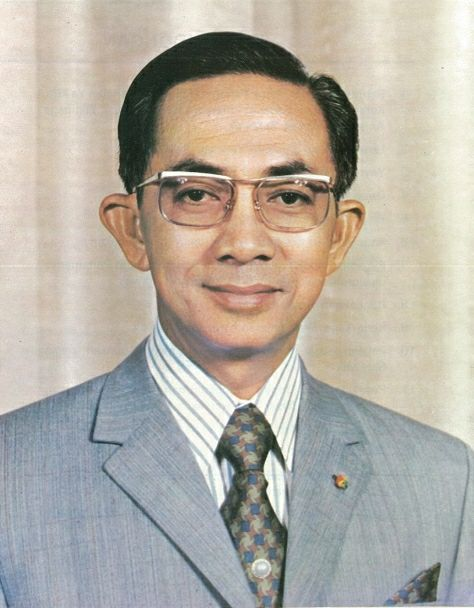
	Majority party	Minority party	Third party
Leader	Abdul Taib Mahmud	Leo Moggie	Abdul Rahman Ya'kub
Party	BN	PBDS	PERMAS
Leader since	26 March 1981	17 July 1983	19 March 1987
Leader's seat	Sebandi	not contesting	Matu-Daro (lost)
Last election	38 seats, 59.2%	6 seats, 9.3%	New party
Seats before	38	6	-
Seats won	28	15	5
Seat change	▼10	▲9	-
Popular vote	249,289	79,548	64,152
Percentage	55.2%	17.6%	14.2%
Swing	▼3.9%	▲8.3%	-
Chief Minister before election
Abdul Taib Mahmud
BN
Subsequent chief minister
Abdul Taib Mahmud
BN

The fifth Sarawak state election was held between Wednesday, 15 April and Thursday, 16 April 1987 with a nomination date set on Monday, 6 April 1987. This was a snap election following the 'Ming Court' affair. The state assembly was dissolved on 12 March 1987 by Sarawak governor with the advice of chief minister of Sarawak, Abdul Taib Mahmud.

All the 48 Sarawak state assembly seats were contested. In this election, Sarawak Barisan Nasional (BN) fielded candidates for all 48 seats, PBDS for 21 seats, PERMAS for 21 seats, Democratic Action Party (DAP) for 11 seats, and Sarawak Democratik Bersatu (BERSATU) for one seat. There were 16 independents contesting for the seats. There were a total of 118 candidates vying for the seats, which was the lowest since 1979 election. A total of 625,020 voters were eligible to cast their votes.

== Background ==
This snap election was called by Taib due to heightening of Ming court affair political crisis when Abdul Rahman Ya'kub together with 27 other state assemblymen signed a letter to call for Taib's resignation. Abdul Rahman formed a new political party named Persatuan Rakyat Malaysia Sarawak (PERMAS) just before the election. Together with Parti Bansa Dayak Sarawak (PBDS), Abdul Rahman would form an opposition alliance to challenge Taib at the polls.

== Candidates ==
The election saw almost all but two incumbents returning to contest either on Barisan Nasional or PBDS-PERMAS ticket

No.	State Constituency	Incumbent Member	Political coalitions and respective candidates and coalitions											
No.	State Constituency	Incumbent Member	Barisan Nasional (BN)		Kumpulan Maju		Democratic Action Party (DAP)		Others					
No.	State Constituency	Incumbent Member	Candidate name	Party	Candidate name	Party	Candidate name	Party	Candidate name	Party	Candidate name	Party	Candidate name	Party
N01	Lundu	Ramsay Noel Jitam	Ramsay Noel Jitam	SUPP	Noor Tahir	PERMAS								
N02	Tasik Biru	Patau Rubis	Patau Rubis	SNAP	Wilfred Rata Nissom	PBDS								
N03	Padungan	Song Swee Guan	Song Swee Guan	SUPP			Tay Cheo Hong	DAP						
N04	Stampin	Sim Kheng Hong	Sim Kheng Hong	SUPP			Sim Kwang Yang	DAP						
N05	Petra Jaya	Hafsah Harun	Sharifah Mordiah Tuanku Fauzi	PBB	Hafsah Harun	PERMAS								
N06	Satok	Abang Johari Openg	Abang Johari Openg	PBB	Wan Ali Tuanku Madhi	PERMAS			Abang Bunsu Abang Sebli	SUDP				
N07	Sebandi	Abdul Taib Mahmud	Abdul Taib Mahmud	PBB	Wan Yusof Tuanku Bujang	PERMAS								
N08	Muara Tuang	Adenan Satem	Adenan Satem	PBB	Abdul Rahman Hamzah	PERMAS								
N09	Batu Kawah	Chong Kiun Kong	Chong Kiun Kong	SUPP	Japat Simol	PERMAS	Lim Guan Sin	DAP						
N10	Bengoh	Wilfred Rata Nissom	Louis Nigel Gines	SUPP	Sora Rusah	PBDS			Robert Abui	IND				
N11	Tarat	Robert Jacob Ridu	Frederick Bayoi Maggie	PBB	Richard Riot Jaem	PBDS			Lai Boon Luan	IND				
N12	Tebakang	Michael Ben Panggi	Andrew Bujang Bareng	SNAP	Michael Ben Panggi	PBDS								
N13	Semera	Wan Wahap Wan Sanusi	Wan Wahap Wan Sanusi	PBB	Wan Zainal Abidin Wan Senusi	PERMAS								
N14	Gedong	Mohammad Tawan Abdullah	Khader Ahmad Zaidel	PBB	Mohammad Tawan Abdullah	PERMAS								
N15	Lingga	Daniel Tajem Miri	Donald Lawan	SNAP	Daniel Tajem Miri	PBDS								
N16	Sri Aman	Hollis Tini	Michael Pilo Gangga	SUPP	Hollis Tini	PBDS								
N17	Engkilili	Sim Choo Nam	Intal Rentap	SUPP	Sim Choo Nam	PBDS								
N18	Batang Air	Mikai Mandau	Nicholas Bawin Anggat	SNAP	Mikai Mandau	PBDS								
N19	Saribas	Zainudin Satem	Bolhassan Di	PBB	Zainudin Satem	PERMAS			Ahmad Johan	IND				
N20	Layar	Alfred Jabu Numpang	Alfred Jabu Numpang	PBB	David Impi	PBDS								
N21	Kalaka	Wan Yusof Tuanku Bujang	Abdul Wahab Aziz	PBB	Abang Yusuf Puteh	PERMAS								
N22	Krian	Edmund Langgu Saga	Peter Nyarok Entrie	SNAP	Edmund Langgu Saga	PBDS								
N23	Kuala Rajang	Saadi Olia	Hamden Ahmad	PBB	Saadi Olia	PERMAS								
N24	Matu-Daro	Wahab Dolah	Wahab Dolah	PBB	Abdul Rahman Ya'kub	PERMAS								
N25	Repok	David Teng Lung Chi	David Teng Lung Chi	SUPP			Jason Wong Sing Nang	DAP						
N26	Meradong	Thomas Hii King Hiong	Thomas Hii King Hiong	SUPP			Chong Siew Chiang	DAP						
N27	Maling	Wong Soon Kai	Wong Soon Kai	SUPP			Ling Sie Ming	DAP						
N28	Seduan	Ting Ing Mieng	Ting Ing Mieng	SUPP	Eric Lee Hie Kui	PERMAS	Ling Sie Kiong	DAP	Loh Ngie Hock	IND				
N29	Igan	David Tiong Chiong Chu	Wong Soon Koh	SUPP	David Tiong Chiong Chu	PERMAS			Anthony Nait Mani	IND				
N30	Dudong	Wilfred Kiroh Jeram	Jawan Empaling	SUPP	Wilfred Kiroh Jeram	PBDS			Siew Chee Kiong	IND				
N31	Balingian	Wan Habib Syed Mahmud	Abdul Ais Abdul Maeed	PBB	Wan Habib Syed Mahmud	PERMAS								
N32	Oya	Salleh Jafaruddin	Mohd. Ghazali Kipli	PBB	Wan Madzihi Wan Mahdzar	PERMAS								
N33	Pakan	Jawie Wilson Masing	William Mawan Ikom	SNAP	Jawie Wilson Masing	PBDS								
N34	Meluan	Geman Itam	Janggu Banyang	PBB	Geman Itam	PBDS								
N35	Machan	Gramong Juna	Martin Charlie	PBB	Gramong Juna	PBDS								
N36	Ngemah	Joseph Kudi	Tan Seliong	SNAP	Joseph Kudi	PBDS								
N37	Katibas	Ambrose Blikau Enturan	Ambrose Blikau Enturan	PBB	Felix Bantin Jibom	PBDS			Anthony Kuin Kedai	IND				
N38	Pelagus	Nueng Kudi	Kenneth Kanyan Temenggong Koh	PBB	Philimon Nuing	PBDS			Sng Chee Hua	IND	Jangi Peng Jemut	IND		
N39	Baleh	James Jemut Masing	Joseph Jinggut	SNAP	James Jemut Masing	PBDS								
N40	Belaga	Tajang Laing	Nyipa Kilah	PBB	Tajang Laing	PERMAS								
N41	Tatau	Bolhasan Kambar	Daniel Sigah Limbai	SNAP	Bolhasan Kambar	PBDS	Jatan Lintang	DAP						
N42	Kemena	Celestine Ujang Jilan	Celestine Ujang Jilan	PBB	Victor Temenggong Angang	PERMAS	Chiew Chiu Sing	DAP						
N43	Subis	Usop Wahab	Usop Wahab	PBB	Salleh Jafaruddin	PERMAS	Chong Kon Fatt	DAP	Ali Mana	IND	Linggie Balong	IND	David La	IND
N44	Miri	George Chan Hong Nam	George Chan Hong Nam	SUPP			Wong Ho Leng	DAP						
N45	Marudi	Edward Jeli Belayong	Atong Chuwat	SNAP	Edward Keli Belayong	PBDS			Abu Bakar Abdullah	IND				
N46	Telang Usan	Joseph Balan Seling	Kebing Wan	PBB	Joseph Balan Seling	PBDS								
N47	Limbang	James Wong Kim Min	James Wong Kim Min	SNAP	Munir Karim	PERMAS			Thianeng Chuanteck	IND	Ali Abdullah	IND		
N48	Lawas	Noor Tahir	Awang Tengah Ali Hasan	PBB	Awangku Yusof Pengiran Bongsu	PERMAS			Michael Labo Buaye	IND				

== Results ==
Party or alliance		Votes	%	Seats	+/–
Barisan Nasional	Sarawak United Peoples' Party	117,058	25.94	11	0
Barisan Nasional	Parti Pesaka Bumiputera Bersatu	95,816	21.23	14	–5
Barisan Nasional	Sarawak National Party	36,415	8.07	3	–5
Barisan Nasional	Total	249,289	55.24	28	–10
Parti Bansa Dayak Sarawak		79,548	17.63	15	+9
Sarawak Malaysian People's Association		64,152	14.22	5	New
Democratic Action Party		51,341	11.38	0	0
Sarawak Demokratik Bersatu		84	0.02	0	0
Independents		6,840	1.52	0	–4
Total		451,254	100.00	48	0
Valid votes		451,254	98.84		
Invalid/blank votes		5,305	1.16		
Total votes		456,559	100.00		
Registered voters/turnout		625,020	73.05		
Source: Straits Times Tindak Malaysia Github

=== Results by constituency ===
Sarawak BN, composed of Parti Pesaka Bumiputera Bersatu (PBB), Sarawak United Peoples' Party (SUPP), and Sarawak National Party (SNAP), won 28 out of 48 seats on the election day, thus able to form a government with a simple majority.

The full list of representatives is shown below:

No.	State Constituency	Elected State Assembly Members	Elected Party
BN 28 | PBDS 15 | PERMAS 5 | DAP 0 | BERSATU 0 | IND 0
N01	Lundu	Ramsay Noel Jitam	BN (SUPP)
N02	Tasik Biru	Patau Anak Rubis @ Dr Patau Rubis	BN (SNAP)
N03	Padungan	Song Swee Guan	BN (SUPP)
N04	Stampin	Sim Kheng Hong	BN (SUPP)
N05	Petra Jaya	Sharifah Mordiah Tuanku Haji Fauzi	BN (PBB)
N06	Satok	Abang Abdul Rahman Zohari bin Tun Abang Haji Openg	BN (PBB)
N07	Sebandi	Datuk Patinggi Haji Abdul Taib bin Mahmud	BN (PBB)
N08	Muara Tuang	Adanan bin Haji Satem	BN (PBB)
N09	Batu Kawah	Chong Kiun Kong	BN (SUPP)
N10	Bengoh	Sora Anak Rusah	PBDS
N11	Tarat	Frederick Bayoi Manggie	BN (PBB)
N12	Tebakang	Michael Ben Ak Panggi	PBDS
N13	Semera	Wan Wahab bin Wan Sanusi	BN (PBB)
N14	Gedong	Mohammad Tawan bin Abdullah @ Hilary Tawan Ak Masan	PERMAS
N15	Lingga	Donald Lawan	BN (SNAP)
N16	Sri Aman	Michael Pilo anak Gangga	BN (SUPP)
N17	Engkilili	Sim Choo Nam	PBDS
N18	Batang Air	Mikai anak Mandau	PBDS
N19	Saribas	Bolhassan bin Di	BN (PBB)
N20	Layar	Alfred Jabu Anak Numpang	BN (PBB)
N21	Kalaka	Datuk Amar Yusuf Puteh	PERMAS
N22	Krian	Datuk Edmund Langgu anak Saga	PBDS
N23	Kuala Rajang	Hamdan bin Ahmad	BN (PBB)
N24	Matu-Daro	Wahab Haji Dollah	BN (PBB)
N25	Repok	David Teng Lung Chi	BN (SUPP)
N26	Meradong	Thomas Hii Kiang Hiong	BN (SUPP)
N27	Maling	Datuk Dr Wong Soon Kai	BN (SUPP)
N28	Seduan	Ting Ing Mieng	BN (SUPP)
N29	Igan	David Tiong Chiong Chu	PERMAS
N30	Dudong	Jawan Empaling	BN (SUPP)
N31	Balingian	Abdul Aziz Majid	BN (PBB)
N32	Oya	Wan Madzihi Wan Mahdzar	PERMAS
N33	Pakan	Jawie Wilson Masing	PBDS
N34	Meluan	German anak Itam	PBDS
N35	Machan	Gramong Juna	PBDS
N36	Ngemah	Joseph anak Kudi	PBDS
N37	Katibas	Felix Bantin anak Jiban	PBDS
N38	Pelagus	Phi Limon anak Nuing	PBDS
N39	Baleh	James Jemut anak Masing	PBDS
N40	Belaga	Nyipa Killah @ Nyipa Bato	BN (PBB)
N41	Tatau	Bolhassan bin Kambar	PBDS
N42	Kemena	Datuk Celestine Ujang Anak Jilan	BN (PBB)
N43	Subis	Datuk Salleh Jafaruddin	PERMAS
N44	Miri	Dr George Chan Hong Nam	BN (SUPP)
N45	Marudi	Edward Jeli Anak Blayong	PBDS
N46	Telang Usan	Balan Seling	PBDS
N47	Limbang	Dato James Wong Kim Min	BN (SNAP)
N48	Lawas	Awang Tengah bin Ali Hasan	BN (PBB)

== See also ==
- Elections in Sarawak
- 1987 Ming Court Affair
- List of Malaysian State Assembly Representatives (1986–1990)
