= Sarawak Malaysian People's Association =

Sarawak Malaysian People's Association Persatuan Rakyat Malaysia Sarawak
- Abbreviation: PERMAS
- Leader: Abdul Rahman Ya'kub
- Founded: 1987
- Dissolved: 1991
- Split from: Parti Pesaka Bumiputera Bersatu
- National affiliation: Kumpulan Maju (1987)

The Sarawak Malaysian People's Association or Persatuan Rakyat Malaysia Sarawak (PERMAS) is now a defunct Malaysian political party based in Sarawak.The party itself was formed in 1987, during the infamous 1987 Ming Court Affair, by a faction dissatisfied with the Chief Minister Abdul Taib Mahmud, led by his own uncle, Former Governor and Chief Minister, Tun Abdul Rahman Ya'kub.

During the 1987 State Election, PERMAS were able to win 5 seats, alongside its ally Sarawak Dayak People's Party or Parti Bansa Dayak Sarawak (PBDS). However, they failed to unseat Taib from the State Government, and they tried again in 1991. However, things were no longer in their favour, as the Barisan Nasional, led in Sarawak by Taib, had an overwhelming victory, gaining 49 out of 56 seats in the State Legislative Council. The crushing defeat marked the end of PERMAS, and it was later dissolved.

== Notable Leaders ==
- Tun Datuk Patinggi Haji Abdul Rahman Ya'kub
- Datuk Salleh Jafaruddin
- Datuk Bujang Ulis @ Bujang Hadziri
- Haji Samat Taba

== General election results ==
Election	Total seats won	Total votes	Share of votes	Outcome of election	Election leader
1990	0 / 180	27,618	0.49%	; No representation in Parliament	Abdul Rahman Ya'kub

== State election results ==
Sarawak State Legislative Assembly
Election	Votes		Seats			Position	Status
Election	Count	%	Result	Won / contested	+/–	Position	Status
1987	64,152	14.2	5 / 48	5 / 21	▲5	3rd	Opposition
1991	16,159	3.4	0 / 56	0 / 12	▼5	▼4th	No seats
