= Kota Raja (Perlis state constituency) =

Perlis constituency

Defunct state constituency
- Legislature: Perlis State Legislative Assembly
- Constituency created: 1984
- Constituency abolished: 1995
- First contested: 1986
- Last contested: 1990

Kota Raja was a state constituency in Perlis, Malaysia, that was represented in the Perlis State Legislative Assembly from 1986 to 1995.

The state constituency was created in the 1984 redistribution and was mandated to return a single member to the Perlis State Legislative Assembly under the first past the post voting system.

== History ==
It was abolished in 1995 when it was redistributed.

=== Representation history ===
Members of the Legislative Assembly for Kota Raja
Assembly	No	Years	Member	Party
Constituency created from Bandar Arau
7th	N11	1986–1990	Abdul Hamid Pawanteh	BN (UMNO)
8th	N11	1990–1995	Abdul Hamid Pawanteh	BN (UMNO)
Constituency abolished, renamed to Pauh

== Election results ==
Perlis state election, 1990
Party	Candidate	Votes	%	∆%
BN	Abdul Hamid Pawanteh	3,794	67.16	▼1.55
S46	Syed Darus Syed Hashim	1,855	32.84	▲32.84
Total valid votes		5,649	100.00	
Total rejected ballots		204		
Unreturned ballots		0		
Turnout		5,859	75.86	▲4.81
Registered electors		7,723		
Majority		1,939	34.32	▼8.54
BN hold		Swing		

Perlis state election, 1986
Party	Candidate	Votes	%
BN	Abdul Hamid Pawanteh	3,176	68.71
PAS	Bahari Ali	1,195	25.85
Independent	Chong Teik Tee	251	5.43
Total valid votes		4,622	100.00
Total rejected ballots		201	
Unreturned ballots		0	
Turnout		4,823	71.05
Registered electors		6,788	
Majority		1,981	42.86
This was a new constituency created.
