= Padang Pauh (state constituency) =

Perlis constituency

Defunct state constituency
- Legislature: Perlis State Legislative Assembly
- Constituency created: 1984
- Constituency abolished: 1995
- First contested: 1986
- Last contested: 1990

Padang Pauh was a state constituency in Perlis, Malaysia, that was represented in the Perlis State Legislative Assembly from 1986 to 1995.

The state constituency was created in the 1984 redistribution and was mandated to return a single member to the Perlis State Legislative Assembly under the first past the post voting system.

== History ==
It was abolished in 1995 when it was redistributed.

=== Representation history ===
Members of the Legislative Assembly for Padang Pauh
Assembly	No	Years	Member	Party
Constituency created from Paya
7th	N04	1986-1990	Bahari Taib	BN (UMNO)
8th	N04	1990-1995	Bahari Taib	BN (UMNO)
Constituency abolished, split into Santan and Mata Ayer

== Election results ==
Perlis state election, 1990
Party	Candidate	Votes	%	∆%
BN	Bahari Taib	4,705	71.41	▲6.23
PAS	Yahya Ahmad	1,742	26.44	▼8.38
Independent	Wan Ismail Wan Ahmad	142	2.16	▲2.16
Total valid votes		6,589	100.00	
Total rejected ballots		258		
Unreturned ballots		530		
Turnout		7,377	82.43	▲8.13
Registered electors		8,949		
Majority		2,963	44.97	▲14.61
BN hold		Swing		

Perlis state election, 1986
Party	Candidate	Votes	%
BN	Bahari Taib	2,918	65.18
PAS	Ahmad Salleh	1,559	34.82
Total valid votes		4,477	100.00
Total rejected ballots		155	
Unreturned ballots		0	
Turnout		4,632	74.30
Registered electors		6,234	
Majority		1,359	30.36
This was a new constituency created.
