= 1991 Sarawak state election =

Malaysian state legislative election

- 27–28 September 1991

All 56 seats in the Sarawak State Legislative Assembly 29 seats needed for a majority
- Registered: 683,984
- Turnout: 480,863 (71.77%)
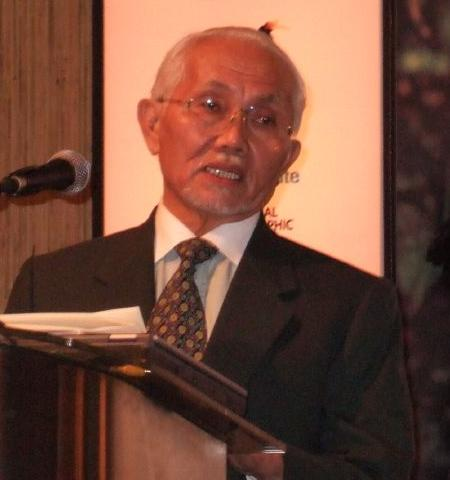

	Majority party	Minority party
Leader	Abdul Taib Mahmud	Leo Moggie
Party	BN	PBDS
Leader since	26 March 1981	17 July 1983
Leader's seat	Asajaya	not contesting
Last election	28 seats, 55.3%	15 seats, 17.6%
Seats before	37	7
Seats won	49	7
Seat change	▲12	Steady
Popular vote	301,067	104,216
Percentage	62.8%	21.7%
Swing	▲7.6%	▲4.1%
Chief Minister before election
Abdul Taib Mahmud
BN
Subsequent chief minister
Abdul Taib Mahmud
BN

The sixth Sarawak state election was held between Friday, 27 September and Saturday, 28 September 1991. This election elected 56 state representatives into the Sarawak State Assembly. This election saw 71.8% of the eligible voters to cast their votes.

Sarawak Barisan Nasional (BN) fielded candidates for all 56 seats, followed by Sarawak Dayak People's Party (PBDS) (34 seats), Parti Negara Rakyat Sarawak (NEGARA) (28 seats), Democratic Action Party (DAP) (18 seats), and Persatuan Rakyat Malaysia Sarawak (PERMAS) (12 seats). There were 19 independents vying for 16 seats. A total of 167 candidates were successfully nominated on the nomination day.

After the 1987 Ming Court Affair, PERMAS which was founded by Abdul Rahman Ya'kub (the uncle of Abdul Taib Mahmud) continued his final bid with PBDS in this election to topple the Taib led Sarawak BN. Before this, PERMAS and PBDS lost narrowly in the 1987 state election. However, Sarawak BN won with a larger majority this time. PERMAS won none of the seats in this election and was dissolved not long after in 1991.

== Background ==
Sarawak is the largest state in Malaysia. The population of the state roughly consists of: 30% Iban people, 30% Malaysian Chinese, 25% Malay and Melanau people, and 7% of other indigenous people. Meanwhile, the Iban, Bidayuh, and other indigenous people are collectively known as the Dayak people. Since 1970, Sarawak has been ruled by the Barisan Nasional (BN) coalition which consisting of: Parti Pesaka Bumiputera Bersatu (PBB), Sarawak National Party (SNAP), and Sarawak United Peoples' Party (SUPP). Roughly speaking, PBB represents the Malay/Melanau people, SUPP represents the Chinese, and SNAP represents the Dayak people. Many Dayaks are members of PBB and SUPP.

Abdul Rahman Ya'kub was the chief minister of Sarawak from 1970 until 1981. He was succeeded by his nephew Abdul Taib Mahmud in 1981. During the 1987 Sarawak state election, an alliance between PBDS and Sarawak Malaysian People's Association (PERMAS) nearly led to the fall of Sarawak BN led by chief minister Taib Mahmud. However, Taib was able to maintain his power after the election, aided by eight opposition state assemblymen who defected to the BN side, thus securing a strong majority in the Sarawak State Legislative Assembly. But in 1990 Malaysian general election, PBDS, which remained with the BN coalition at the federal level, won four parliamentary seats. Another four independents backed by the party also won their seats, thus bringing a total of eight parliamentarians under PBDS control out of 25 parliamentary seats in Sarawak. During the 1985 state election in the neighbouring state of Sabah, the Bajau/Malay-dominated Sabah People's United Front (BERJAYA) was ousted from power and was replaced by the Kadazan-dominated Parti Bersatu Sabah (PBS). Therefore, there were high hopes from political analysts that the Dayak-based Parti Bansa Dayak Sarawak (PBDS) would topple the Malay/Melanau-dominated PBB because Sarawak shared a similar ethnic-based electoral history with Sabah since the formation of Malaysia.

== Electoral system ==
Before the 1991 election, Election Commission of Malaysia had redrawn the electoral boundaries of Sarawak, increasing the number of state assembly seats from 48 to 56. With the new boundaries, there were 18 Malay/Melanau constituencies, 17 Iban-majority seats, 11 Chinese-majority seats, 5 Bidayuh seats, 2 Orang Ulu seats and 3 mixed seats. Incumbent chief minister Taib Mahmud dissolved the state assembly in September 1991.

== Parties and leaders ==
=== Government ===
The Sarawak BN ruling coalition consisted of PBB, SNAP, and SUPP. In July 1991, three notable PERMAS personalities withdrew from the party and announced their support for PBB. Just before the election, the seats composition for BN was: 21 for PBB, 11 for SUPP, and 5 for SNAP. The seats negotiations amongst the component parties in BN did not go smoothly. SNAP demanded 17 seats because it wanted to reclaim all the seats that was lost to PBDS in the 1983 and 1987. PBB, the largest component party of the Sarawak BN coalition, had the final say in the seat allocation. The party was the major beneficiary from PBDS and PERMAS defections. They did not give the seats back to SNAP. PBB leaders decided to give a warning that if SNAP continued to raise the issue of seat allocations in the public, SNAP would get only five seats in this election, instead of eight. This measure effectively silenced SNAP and the final seat allocation for the component parties were: PBB given 31 seats, SUPP 17 seats, and SNAP 8 seats. In fact, SNAP was contesting only for 7 seats because for the seat of Bukit Begunan, SNAP was using a "loan" candidate from PBB.

=== Opposition ===
Just before the state election, the opposition only had 11 seats: seven seats from PBDS and four from PERMAS. PBDS fielded 34 candidates in this election, including seven Chinese. PERMAS fielded 11 candidates in Malay/Melanau areas, the Democratic Action Party (DAP) fielded 18 candidates, and the Sarawak People's National Party (Parti NEGARA) fielded 28 candidates. Fourteen independents participated in the election. Most of the contests were between PBDS and BN, and DAP against SUPP.

PBDS hoped to repeat their victories during the 1987 state election by exploiting Dayak nationalism. By winning in this election, they also hoped to install a Dayak chief minister because the Iban people is the largest ethnic group in Sarawak. This was known as "Project Chief Minister 1992" because PBDS was anticipating the election to be held in 1992. Meanwhile, DAP hoped that they could at least win a single state assembly seat in the Chinese-dominated parliamentary seats of Sibu and Bandar Kuching. DAP put high hopes on the state assembly seats of Bawang Assan in Sibu and Batu Lintang in Kuching. DAP first won the Bandar Kuching parliamentary seat in 1982 and retained the seat in the 1986 and 1990 parliamentary elections. DAP won the Sibu parliamentary seat for one term in 1982 and Lanang in 1990. However, DAP had not won any state assembly seats since its inception in Sarawak in 1978. PBDS tried to cooperate with DAP. However, PBDS, as part of the national BN coalition, was opposed by the national BN chairman on any possibilities of such cooperation. DAP and PBDS, however, reached an agreement that they would contest the Repok and Meradong constituencies in Sarikei and Bintangor respectively.

== Campaign ==
=== Barisan Nasional ===
The press, controlled by the BN parties, covered positively about BN candidates while reporting negatively about the opposition. Parti NEGARA was mocked by Sarawak BN as "mosquito" party. The credibility of Parti NEGARA was damaged when its president had to go to court to justify his standing as the president of the party. Parti NEGARA was speculated to receive financial backing from PBS government in Sabah in order to contest against BN.

BN campaigned on the continuation of development policy that can guarantee a "better future for all". BN also had more money and resources when compared to the opposition in terms of printed material, contributions, and campaign workers. SUPP, a component party of BN, appealed to the Chinese that a vote for SUPP is a guarantee for "Chinese participation in government". Chan Seng Khai, a SUPP candidate contesting for the Batu Lintang state assembly seat, was an underdog at the beginning of the campaign period. He lost to Sim Kwang Yang, a DAP parliamentarian for Bandar Kuching in 1990 parliamentary elections. However, when Sarawak BN pledged RM 60 million for upgrading the drainage system in Kuching, the Chinese voters decided to support SUPP for the continuation of development. Meanwhile, in Sibu, a relative newcomer from SUPP, Wong Soon Koh (who was related to SUPP chairman Wong Soon Kai) emphasized that only a Sarawak BN government is able to carry out its pledges. He stated that DAP could only "bark like a dog and make empty promises". Soon Koh lost to David Tiong from PERMAS in the 1987 state elections for the constituency of Igan. Despite losing, Soon Koh continued his community services and contested for Bawang Assan constituency in this election. SUPP also portrayed Ling Sie Ming, a DAP parliamentarian for Sibu from 1982 to 1986 as ineffective. SUPP also successfully portrayed DAP as an outsider party from Peninsular Malaysia which has no interest in Sarawak. Chief minister Taib also barred Tengku Razaleigh Hamzah (leader of Semangat 46) from entering Sarawak campaigning for DAP during the state election.

=== Opposition parties ===
PBDS promoted Dayak nationalism by claiming that the Dayaks was sidelined by Malay/Melanau and Chinese political elites. PBDS also campaigned against BN excessive logging policies and called for respect for Dayak native land laws. However, PBDS only contested for 24 Dayak majority seats. Had it even won all the seats, PBDS would still be five seats short of a simple majority to form the state government. Besides, the "Project Chief Minister 1992" did not make sense when PBDS party president Leo Moggie was still a federal cabinet minister and did not contest for any state assembly seats in Sarawak. Besides, PBDS did not announce the chief minister nominee if they swept to power in this election. PBDS also tried to appeal to the Chinese by setting up Chinese Affairs Consultative Committee (CACC), allowing Chinese input into PBDS's decision-making process. PBDS also promised RM 5 million yearly for Chinese independent high schools. However, these two efforts were unsuccessful because PBDS did not allow non-Dayaks to become members. The print media also launched a successful campaign against PBDS by saying that PBDS membership requirement showed that it is a racial party and will not protect Chinese interests. BN also said that PBDS Dayak nationalism was only for the Iban people, as the Iban people dominated the PBDS party. The aim is to create a divide between the Ibans and the other Dayak ethnic groups in the party. The BN federal ministers decided to campaign for Sarawak BN instead of PBDS even though PBDS is also a member of the federal BN coalition. This further undermined the credibility of PBDS.

Meanwhile, DAP campaigned so that the voters would allow DAP to break the "egg" which means "zero" in Chinese context. This was because DAP always returned empty-handed in previous state elections. DAP hoped that the Chinese would return at least one state assemblyman for DAP. DAP called the SUPP a "tycoon" party which serves only the interests of big businesses and towkays instead of the people. DAP also portrayed SUPP as an arrogant party and Sarawak BN as "corrupted". Therefore, a strong opposition is needed to keep the ruling government in check.

== Results ==
On the morning of 29 September 1991, Sarawak BN had made a clean sweep of all the state assembly seats except for seven seats won by PBDS. Parti NEGARA, PERMAS, and DAP returned empty-handed. Senior PBDS leaders such as Jawie Masing, who stood for Pakan, and Edmund Langgu, who stood for Krian, were defeated by newcomers from Sarawak BN. However, PBDS deputy president Daniel Tajem was able to win back his old seat of Bukit Begunan which he has lost in the 1987 elections. Another two PBDS members, Harrison Ngau Laing and Richard Riot Jaem also lost their seats to BN. James Jemut Masing, the senior vice-president of PBDS was a consistent performer in this election. He increased his majority in the constituency of Baleh. The only successful PBDS Chinese candidate was Sng Chee Hua at Pelagus. James Masing, surprised by the scale of the PBDS defeat in this election, stated that,"I am baffled. Perhaps we haven't explained the issues enough or they (the Dayak voters) are quite happy with the government". However, PBDS voters share increased from 17.63% in 1987 to 21.48% in 1991.

For DAP, this election was another disappointment. DAP had lost significantly to SUPP in Bawang Assan and Batu Lintang. Several of the DAP candidates in rural areas even lost their deposits. The Sarawak Chinese viewed the vote for DAP is a "wasted vote" because resource allocations are decided by the state government based in Kuching. Therefore, a vote for SUPP is needed to protect Chinese community and business interests. On the other hand, at parliamentary level, DAP parliamentarians were elected as a "protest vote" against the federal BN coalition which was perceived as "anti-Chinese". The only bright spot for DAP was at the Padungan state constituency when a newcomer named Dominique Ng Kim Ho put up a good fight against a popular SUPP candidate, Song Swee Guan. Dominique gained more than half of Song's total votes.

=== Summary ===
Party or alliance		Votes	%	Seats	+/–
Barisan Nasional	Parti Pesaka Bumiputera Bersatu	142,028	29.60	27	+13
Barisan Nasional	Sarawak United Peoples' Party	126,107	26.28	16	+5
Barisan Nasional	Sarawak National Party	32,932	6.86	6	+3
Barisan Nasional	Total	301,067	62.75	49	+21
Parti Bansa Dayak Sarawak		104,216	21.72	7	-8
Democratic Action Party		46,469	9.69	0	0
Sarawak Malaysian People's Association		16,159	3.37	0	-5
Sarawak People's National Party		5,651	1.18	0	New
Independents		6,209	1.29	0	0
Total		479,771	100.00	56	+8
Valid votes		479,771	97.74		
Invalid/blank votes		11,092	2.26		
Total votes		490,863	100.00		
Registered voters/turnout		683,984	71.77		
Source: Hazis, Tindak Malaysia Github

Registered voter count refers to total electorate of contested constituencies. Total Electorate for Sarawak 1991 elections inclusive two uncontested constituencies is 703062.

=== Results by constituency ===
The Sarawak BN won a total 49 out of 56 seats in the state assembly, including two uncontested seats. The remaining seats were won by PBDS.

On the nomination day, Sarawak BN won two uncontested seats, namely N.3 Pantai Damai and N.24 Saribas.

The full list of elected representatives is shown below:

No.	State Constituency	Elected State Assembly Members	Elected Party
BN 49 | PBDS 7 | PERMAS 0 | NEGARA 0 | DAP 0 | IND 0
N01	Tanjung Datu	Datuk Ramsay Noel Jitam	BN (SUPP)
N02	Tasik Biru	Datuk Patau Rubis	BN (SNAP)
N03	Pantai Damai	Datin Paduka Sharifah Mordiah Tuanku Fauzi (Note: Won uncontested)	BN (PBB)
N04	Sejingkat	Dr Abang Haji Draup Zamahari	BN (PBB)
N05	Tupong	Haji Daud bin Abdul Rahman	BN (PBB)
N06	Satok	Datuk Abang Abdul Rahman Zohari bin Tun Abang Haji Openg	BN (PBB)
N07	Padungan	Song Swee Guan	BN (SUPP)
N08	Pending	Sim Kheng Hui	BN (SUPP)
N09	Batu Lintang	Chan Seng Khai	BN (SUPP)
N10	Batu Kawah	Chong Kiun Kong	BN (SUPP)
N11	Bengoh	William Tanyuh Anak Nub	BN (SUPP)
N12	Asajaya	Datuk Patinggi Abdul Taib Mahmud	BN (PBB)
N13	Muara Tuang	Datuk Adenan bin Haji Satem	BN (PBB)
N14	Tarat	Frederick Bayoi Anak Manggie	BN (PBB)
N15	Tebedu	Michael Ben	BN (PBB)
N16	Semera	Wan Abdul Wahab	BN (PBB)
N17	Simunjan	Mohd. Naroden Bin Majais	BN (PBB)
N18	Sebuyau	Julaihi Bin Narawi	BN (PBB)
N19	Beladin	Bolhassan Bin Di	BN (PBB)
N20	Bukit Begunan	Daniel Tajem Anak Miri	PBDS
N21	Simanggang	Michael Pilo Anak Gangga	BN (SUPP)
N22	Engkilili	Toh Heng San	BN (SUPP)
N23	Batang Ai	Dublin Unting Anak Ingkot	PBDS
N24	Saribas	Dr. Haji Wahbi Haji Junaidi	BN (PBB)
N25	Layar	Datuk Amar Alfred Jabu Anak Numpang	BN (PBB)
N26	Kalaka	Abdul Wahab Bin Aziz	BN (PBB)
N27	Krian	Peter Nyarok Anak Entre	BN (SNAP)
N28	Belawai	Hamden Bin Ahmad	BN (PBB)
N29	Serdeng	Mohamad Asfia Awang Nasar	BN (PBB)
N30	Matu-Daro	Wahab Haji Dollah	BN (PBB)
N31	Meradong	Thomas Hii King Hiong	BN (SUPP)
N32	Repok	David Teng Lung Chi	BN (SUPP)
N33	Pakan	William Mawan Anak Ikom	BN (SNAP)
N34	Meluan	Geman Anak Itam	BN (SNAP)
N35	Ngemah	Gabriel Adit Anak Demong	PBDS
N36	Machan	Gramong Juna	BN (PBB)
N37	Dudong	Dr Soon Choon Teck	BN (SUPP)
N38	Bukit Assek	Dr Wong Soon Kai	BN (SUPP)
N39	Bawang Assan	Wong Soon Koh	BN (SUPP)
N40	Seduan	Ting Ing Mieng	BN (SUPP)
N41	Dalat	Datuk Effendi Norwawi	BN (PBB)
N42	Balingian	Abdul Ajis Bin Abdul Majeeb	BN (PBB)
N43	Tamin	Joseph Entulu Belaun	PBDS
N44	Kakus	John Sikie Anak Tayai	PBDS
N45	Pelagus	Dato Sng Chee Hua	PBDS
N46	Katibas	Ambrose Blikau Anak Entruan	BN (PBB)
N47	Baleh	Dr James Jemut Masing	PBDS
N48	Belaga	Nyipa Bato	BN (PBB)
N49	Kemena	Datuk Celestine Ujang Anak Jilan	BN (PBB)
N50	Kidurong	Michael Sim	BN (SUPP)
N51	Lambir	Usop Bin Wahab	BN (PBB)
N52	Piasau	Datuk Dr George Chan Hong Nam	BN (SUPP)
N53	Marudi	Datuk Edward Jeli	BN (SNAP)
N54	Telang Usan	Datuk Balan Seling	BN (PBB)
N55	Limbang	Datuk Amar James Wong Kim Min	BN (SNAP)
N56	Lawas	Awang Tengah Ali Hasan	BN (PBB)

== Aftermath ==
After the election, PBDS decided rejoin Sarawak BN without any conditions. Initially, chief minister Taib was skeptical about PBDS intentions. SNAP, a component party in Sarawak BN, also expressed strong opposition against the readmission of PBDS into the BN fold. PBDS, a splinter party from SNAP, have been the rival party of SNAP since 1983. Prime minister Mahathir Mohamad, who is also federal BN chairman, was unhappy about the status of PBDS which was part of government and part of opposition at the same time. Both Mahathir and Taib were keen to readmit PBDS to gain the remaining faction of Dayak support. However, SUPP welcomed the addition of PBDS into Sarawak BN. SUPP saw this move as a necessary step to bolster the Dayak support towards SUPP, thus strengthening the status of SUPP in Sarawak BN coalition. Negotiations did not start until 1992 when PBDS proved its sincerity in rejoining Sarawak BN. PBDS also agreed that all the parliamentary and state assembly seat allocations will be left to the Sarawak BN to decide. A memorandum of understanding was signed between PBDS and Sarawak BN. PBDS was later officially admitted into Sarawak BN on 1 June 1994. From now on, PBDS could no longer criticize BN on issues that worked against the Dayaks.

After this election, PERMAS was relegated "mosquito party" status. With the readmission of PBDS into BN fold in 1994, chief minister Taib ruled Sarawak without any opposition in the state assembly.
