= Lindongan (state constituency) =

Lindungan
Selangor constituency

Defunct state constituency
- Legislature: Selangor State Legislative Assembly
- Constituency created: 1984
- Constituency abolished: 1995
- First contested: 1986
- Last contested: 1990

Lindungan was a state constituency in Selangor, Malaysia, that was represented in the Selangor State Legislative Assembly from 1986 to 1995.

The state constituency was created in the 1984 redistribution and was mandated to return a single member to the Selangor State Legislative Assembly under the first past the post voting system.

== History ==
It was abolished in 1995 when it was redistributed.

=== Representation history ===
Members of the Legislative Assembly for Lindungan
Assembly	No	Years	Member	Party
Constituency created from Sungei Way
7th	N20	1986-1990	Mazlan Harun	BN (UMNO)
8th	N20	1990-1995	Zahar Hashim	BN (UMNO)
Constituency abolished, renamed to Taman Medan

== Election results ==
Selangor state election, 1990: Lindungan
Party	Candidate	Votes	%	∆%
BN	Zahar Hashim	14,913	61.38	▲1.89
S46	Mazlan Harun	9,383	38.62	▲38.62
Total valid votes		24,296	100.00	
Total rejected ballots		561		
Unreturned ballots		36		
Turnout		24,893	69.11	▲2.96
Registered electors		36,021		
Majority		5,530	22.76	▼2.48
BN hold		Swing		

Selangor state election, 1986: Lindungan
Party	Candidate	Votes	%
BN	Mazlan Harun	9,046	59.49
DAP	Chia Kwai Loy	5,208	34.25
PAS	Supian Md Nordin	951	6.25
Total valid votes		15,205	100.00
Total rejected ballots		273	
Unreturned ballots		0	
Turnout		15,478	66.15
Registered electors		23,400	
Majority		3,838	25.24
This was a new constituency created.
