= Taman Aman (state constituency) =

Selangor constituency

Defunct state constituency
- Legislature: Selangor State Legislative Assembly
- Constituency created: 1984
- Constituency abolished: 1995
- First contested: 1986
- Last contested: 1990

Taman Aman was a state constituency in Selangor, Malaysia, that was represented in the Selangor State Legislative Assembly from 1986 to 1995.

The state constituency was created in the 1984 redistribution and was mandated to return a single member to the Selangor State Legislative Assembly under the first past the post voting system.

== History ==
It was abolished in 1995 when it was redistributed.

=== Representation history ===
Members of the Legislative Assembly for Taman Aman
Assembly	No	Years	Member	Party
Constituency created from Petaling Jaya
7th	N26	1986-1990	Oon Hong Geok (溫鳳玉)	DAP
8th	N26	1990-1995	Oon Hong Geok (溫鳳玉)	GR (DAP)
Constituency renamed to Kampung Tunku

== Election results ==
Selangor state election, 1990
Party	Candidate	Votes	%	∆%
DAP	Oon Hong Geok	10,749	71.96	▲3.14
BN	Kam Kin Chen	4,189	28.04	▼0.86
Total valid votes		14,938	100.00	
Total rejected ballots		146		
Unreturned ballots		0		
Turnout		15,084	66.50	▼1.95
Registered electors		22,683		
Majority		6,560	43.92	▲4.00
DAP hold		Swing		

Selangor state election, 1986
Party	Candidate	Votes	%
DAP	Oon Hong Geok	9,944	68.82
BN	Lee Chu Kob	4,176	28.90
SDP	Gan Lee Beng	329	2.28
Total valid votes		14,449	100.00
Total rejected ballots		123	
Unreturned ballots		0	
Turnout		14,572	68.45
Registered electors		21,287	
Majority		5,768	39.92
This was a new constituency created.
