= Sapetang (state constituency) =

Perak, Malaysia state legislative district

Perak constituency

Defunct state constituency
- Legislature: Perak State Legislative Assembly
- Constituency created: 1984
- Constituency abolished: 1995
- First contested: 1986
- Last contested: 1990

Sapetang was a state constituency in Perak, Malaysia, that was represented in the Perak State Legislative Assembly from 1984 to 1995.

The state constituency was first contested in 1986 and is mandated to return a single Assemblyman to the Perak State Legislative Assembly under the first-past-the-post voting system.

== History ==
It was abolished in 1995 when it was redistributed.

=== Representation history ===
Members of the Legislative Assembly for Sapetang
Assembly	Years	Member	Party
Constituency created from Gunong Semanggol, Changkat Jering and Kamunting
7th	1986–1990	See Tean Seng	BN (GERAKAN)
8th	1990–1995	Au How Cheong	BN (GERAKAN)
Constituency abolished, renamed to Kuala Sapetang

== Election results ==
Perak state election, 1990
Party	Candidate	Votes	%	∆%
BN	Au How Cheong	7,899	57.66	▲2.43
S46	Ahmad Baharom	5,801	42.34	▲42.34
Total valid votes		13,700	96.17	
Total rejected ballots		545	3.83	
Unreturned ballots		0	0	
Turnout		14,245	73.27	▲4.03
Registered electors		19,442		
Majority		2,098	15.32	▼12.93
BN hold		Swing		
Source(s) "KEPUTUSAN PILIHAN RAYA UMUM DEWAN UNDANGAN NEGERI PERAK BAGI TAHUN 1990".

Perak state election, 1986
Party	Candidate	Votes	%
BN	See Tean Seng	6,993	55.23
DAP	Chuah Tiong San	3,416	26.98
PAS	Mokhtar L Awang	2,253	17.79
Total valid votes		12,662	95.08
Total rejected ballots		655	4.92
Unreturned ballots		0	0
Turnout		13,317	69.24
Registered electors		19,232	
Majority		3,577	28.25
This was a new constituency created.
