= Telok Gadong (state constituency) =

Selangor constituency

Defunct state constituency
- Legislature: Selangor State Legislative Assembly
- Constituency created: 1984
- Constituency abolished: 1995
- First contested: 1986
- Last contested: 1990

Telok Gadong was a state constituency in Selangor, Malaysia, that was represented in the Selangor State Legislative Assembly from 1986 to 1995.

The state constituency was created in the 1984 redistribution and was mandated to return a single member to the Selangor State Legislative Assembly under the first past the post voting system.

== History ==
It was abolished in 1995 when it was redistributed.

=== Representation history ===
Members of the Legislative Assembly for Telok Gadong
Assembly	No	Years	Member	Party
Constituency created from Selat Klang
7th	N35	1986-1990	Tong Yoke Seng (童榮成)	BN (MCA)
8th	N35	1990-1995	Chew Kim Swee (周金水)	DAP
Constituency abolished, renamed to Pelabuhan Klang

== Election results ==
Selangor state election, 1990
Party	Candidate	Votes	%	∆%
DAP	Chew Kim Swee	8,321	53.35	▲6.60
BN	Tong Yoke Seng	7,276	46.65	▼6.60
Total valid votes		15,597	100.00	
Total rejected ballots		355		
Unreturned ballots		0		
Turnout		15,952	70.04	▲1.34
Registered electors		22,777		
Majority		1,045	6.70	▲0.20
DAP gain from BN		Swing		?

Selangor state election, 1986
Party	Candidate	Votes	%
BN	Tong Yoke Seng	7,711	53.25
DAP	Chua Kow Eng	6,770	46.75
Total valid votes		14,481	100.00
Total rejected ballots		387	
Unreturned ballots		0	
Turnout		14,868	68.70
Registered electors		21,643	
Majority		941	6.50
This was a new constituency created.
