= Sungai Tinggi =

Selangor constituency

Defunct state constituency
- Legislature: Selangor State Legislative Assembly
- Constituency created: 1984
- Constituency abolished: 1995
- First contested: 1986
- Last contested: 1990

Sungai Tinggi was a state constituency in Selangor, Malaysia, that was represented in the Selangor State Legislative Assembly from 1986 to 1995.

The state constituency was created in the 1984 redistribution and was mandated to return a single member to the Selangor State Legislative Assembly under the first past the post voting system.

== History ==
It was abolished in 1995 when it was redistributed.

=== Representation history ===
Members of the Legislative Assembly for Sungai Tinggi
Assembly	No	Years	Member	Party
Constituency created from Permatang
7th	N10	1986-1990	Yusoff Hassan	BN (UMNO)
8th	N10	1990-1995	Yusoff Hassan	BN (UMNO)
Constituency abolished, merged into Jeram and Ijuk

== Election results ==
Selangor state election, 1990: Sungai Tinggi
Party	Candidate	Votes	%	∆%
BN	Yusoff Hassan	5,210	74.0	▼4.30
PAS	Arbain Hassan	1,822	25.91	▲4.30
Total valid votes		7,032	100.00	
Total rejected ballots		341		
Unreturned ballots		5		
Turnout		7,378	75.44	▲2.99
Registered electors		9,780		
Majority		3,388	48.18	▼8.59
BN hold		Swing		

Selangor state election, 1986: Sungai Tinggi
Party	Candidate	Votes	%
BN	Yusoff Hassan	4,965	78.39
PAS	Jamil Nawawi	1,369	21.61
Total valid votes		6,334	100.00
Total rejected ballots		383	
Unreturned ballots		0	
Turnout		6,717	72.45
Registered electors		9,271	
Majority		3,596	56.78
This was a new constituency created.
