= Parti Bansa Dayak Sarawak =

Political party of Malaysia

Sarawak Native People's Party
- Malay name: Parti Bansa Dayak Sarawak ڤرتي بنسا دايق سراوق
- Chinese name: 砂拉越達雅黨 砂拉越达雅党; Shālāyuè Dáyǎ dǎng 砂拉越土著人民黨 砂拉越土著人民党; Shālāyuè tǔzhù rénmín dǎng
- Abbreviation: PBDS
- President: Daniel Tajem
- Founder: Leo Moggie Irok
- Founded: 17 July 1983
- Dissolved: 5 December 2003 (1st); 21 October 2004 (2nd)
- Split from: Sarawak National Party
- Succeeded by: Parti Rakyat Sarawak; Malaysian Dayak Congress; Parti Bansa Dayak Sarawak Baru
- Headquarters: Kuching, Sarawak
- National affiliation: Barisan Nasional (1983–2004); Kumpulan Maju (1987)
- Colours: Black, white

The Sarawak Native People's Party or Malay: Parti Bansa Dayak Sarawak (PBDS, lit. "Sarawak Dayak People's Party") was a political party in the state of Sarawak in Malaysia. It was established in 1983, by Datuk Amar Leo Moggie Irok, after seceding from Sarawak National Party (SNAP) following his loss in the contest for the SNAP's president post against Datuk Amar James Wong Kim Ming.

PBDS, as a breakaway of SNAP, won 15 seats in the 1987 Sarawak state election, while its ally, Sarawak Malaysian People's Association (PERMAS), won only 5 seats. Overall, the PBDS won 28 constituencies with PBB 14; SUPP 11 and SNAP 3. In both cases, SNAP and PBDS (both parties now defunct) joined the Malaysian National Front or Barisan Nasional (BN) as the ruling coalition.

The party was dissolved twice, firstly in 2003 and secondly in 2004 due to leadership crisis between Datuk Daniel Tajem Miri as the PBDS president and Dr James Jemut Masing as the challenger with the latter leaves the party and founded Parti Rakyat Sarawak in 2003.

The dissolution of PBDS led to the formation two offshoot parties; one is Parti Rakyat Sarawak (PRS) led by Datuk Dr James Jemut Masing and Datuk Sng Chee Hua which was successfully registered and admitted into BN in 2004 while another Malaysian Dayak Congress (MDC) failed to be registered by the Registrar of Societies (RoS). Meanwhile, there was also an attempt to revive PBDS and it was finally successfully approved and re-registered as Parti Bansa Dayak Sarawak (Baru) in 2013.

== Government offices ==
=== State government ===
- Sarawak (1983–1987, 1994–2004)

Note: bold as Premier/Chief Minister, italic as junior partner

== General election results ==
| Election | Total seats won | Seats contested | Total votes | Share of votes | Outcome of election | Election leader |
|---|---|---|---|---|---|---|
| 1986 | 5 / 177 | 6 | 24,822 | 0.52% | ▲5 seat; Governing coalition (Barisan Nasional) | Leo Moggie Irok |
| 1990 | 4 / 180 | 6 | 22,590 | | ▼1 seat; Governing coalition (Barisan Nasional) | Leo Moggie Irok |
| 1995 | 5 / 192 | 6 | 29,768 | | ▲1 seat; Governing coalition (Barisan Nasional) | Leo Moggie Irok |
| 1999 | 6 / 193 | 6 | 51,659 | | ▲1 seat; Governing coalition (Barisan Nasional) | Leo Moggie Irok |
| 2004 | 6 / 219 | 6 | 46,292 | 0.66% | 0 seat; Governing coalition (Barisan Nasional) | Daniel Tajem |

== State election results ==
Sarawak State Legislative Assembly
| Election | Votes | | Seats | | | Position (Note: As part of electoral coalition.) | Status |
| Election | Count | % | Result | Won / contested | +/– | Position | Status |
|---|---|---|---|---|---|---|---|
| 1983 | 33,712 | 9.3 | 6 / 48 | 6 / 14 | ▲6 | 3rd | BN (Note: BN–PBDS–SNAP (1983–1984)) |
| 1987 | 79,548 | 17.6 | 15 / 48 | 15 / 21 | ▲9 | ▲2nd | Opposition |
| 1991 | 104,216 | 21.7 | 7 / 56 | 7 / 34 | ▼8 | 2nd | Opposition (1991–1994) |
| 1991 | 104,216 | 21.7 | 7 / 56 | 7 / 34 | ▼8 | 2nd | BN (1994–1996) |
| 1996 | 21,974 | 6.0 | 7 / 62 | 7 / 7 | Steady | 1st (Barisan Nasional) | BN |
| 2001 | 34,606 | 6.4 | 8 / 62 | 8 / 8 | ▲1 | 1st (Barisan Nasional) | BN |

== See also ==
- Dayak people
- Politics of Malaysia
- List of political parties in Malaysia
