= Sarawak United Peoples' Party =

Malaysian political party

- Malay name: Parti Rakyat Bersatu Sarawak
- Abbreviation: SUPP
- President: Sim Kui Hian
- Secretary-General: Sebastian Ting Chiew Yew
- Deputy Presidents: Richard Riot Jaem; Lee Kim Shin
- Chairman of Central Youth Section: Kevin Lau Kor Jie
- Chairwoman of Central Women's Section: Kho Teck Wan
- Founder: Ong Kee Hui; Stephen Yong Kuet Tze
- Founded: 4 June 1959
- Headquarters: 7, Jalan Tan Sri Ong Kee Hui, 93300 Kuching, Sarawak
- Newspaper: SA 'ATI (United)
- Youth wing: SUPP Youth Section
- Women's wing: SUPP Women's Section
- Ideology: Multiracialism; Sarawak regionalism Sarawak Chinese interests
- Political position: Centre
- National affiliation: Gabungan Parti Sarawak (since 2018) (Note: The party was formerly part of the Malaysian Solidarity Convention (1965) and Barisan Nasional (1973–2018) and was aligned with Alliance (1970–73). Through GPS it was aligned with Perikatan Nasional (2020–2022) and is aligned with Barisan Nasional (since 2018)); National Unity Government (since 2022)
- Colours: Yellow
- Anthem: Sa'ati
- Dewan Negara: 1 / 70
- Dewan Rakyat: 2 / 31 (Sarawak seats)
- Sarawak State Legislative Assembly: 13 / 82

Website
- www.supp.org.my

The Sarawak United Peoples' Party (abbrev: SUPP; Malay: Parti Rakyat Bersatu Sarawak) is a Sarawak-based political party in Malaysia. Founded in 1959, the SUPP was the first political party established in Sarawak. Having its roots in left-leaning ideologies and nationalism, the party historically championed the causes of the working class and Sarawak Chinese community interests. The SUPP is currently led by party president Sim Kui Hian, succeeding the post from his predecessor, Peter Chin Fah Kui, in 2014.

Formerly one of the Sarawak-based components of Barisan Nasional (BN) from 1970 until June 2018, (Note: Specifically, Barisan Nasional Sarawak (BN Sarawak) consists of only 4 locally-based parties, in that they exist and operate exclusively in Sarawak. The 3 other local parties are Parti Pesaka Bumiputera Bersatu (PBB), Parti Rakyat Sarawak (PRS), and Progressive Democratic Party (PDP).) the SUPP was known for its tense relationship with its Peninsula-based BN partners. Following the 2018 general election defeat of Barisan Nasional, the coalition's Sarawak-based components, including the SUPP, withdrew from the coalition on 12 June 2018 and formed the Gabungan Parti Sarawak (GPS) which forms the state government to this day.

== History ==
Being the first local political party, the origins Sarawak United Peoples' Party (SUPP) are tied to Sarawak's history of the 20th century political awakening. After World War II, the last Rajah of Sarawak, Charles Vyner Brooke ceded Sarawak to Britain in 1946, turning it into an official British Crown Colony to the dismay of many locals. This eventually gave rise to local anti-cession and anti-imperialist movements that further sparked local political consciousness. The triggering event was the proclamation of Sarawak's Constitution of 1959 which fell short of expectations for many who hoped to see significant progress towards self-governance. The need for an organised political front to champion Sarawakian interests finally led to the formation of SUPP on 4 June 1959, with Ong Kee Hui as its founding president. With a "Sarawak for Sarawakians" ideology – SUPP's movement gained widespread support, including winning big in the local elections of November 1959, alarming the then ruling British colonial government. When the proposal for Federation of Malaysia was first mooted in 1961, SUPP came out strongly to oppose the idea. Ong argued for Sarawak's independence before setting up a greater federation.

In December 1962, the British colonial government launched a crackdown on all dissenting groups in Sarawak. Many party members were detained, some even deported from Sarawak for alleged communist activities as, at the time, some members had links with Communist-affiliated organisations. (Note: Ong Kee Hui and Stephen Yong seemed to be aware, they held that while some members were more radical, they needed a political outlet, and the party could guide them to become a moderate, positive force.) Nonetheless, SUPP still did well at the Sarawak elections of June 1963 but it left one-seat-short of a majority to form government, thus it remained as the opposition party. On 22 July 1963, Sarawak gained independent self-governance from Britain. On 16 September, Sarawak together with the Federation of Malaya, Singapore and North Borneo (Sabah) jointly founded the Federation of Malaysia. In June 1965, the government launched “Operation Hammer” to counter prevailing communist threats. Party leaders vehemently protested when about 10,000 Sarawakians men, women and children were forced to resettle under curfew – surrounded by barb-wire fencing – including more than a hundred SUPP members. Party leaders initiated daily visits to the resettlement centres to monitor the welfare of the detainees, but later, even this was barred by the government.

In May 1969, due to 13 May riots in Peninsular Malaysia, an Emergency Proclamation was declared across the country, suspending an ongoing elections in Sarawak. When the Sarawak elections resumed in 1970, SUPP emerged as the single party with largest number of votes, but no party has control of majority seats to form a government. Considering that this crisis for a functioning government occurred at a time when, on one hand, a state of turmoil post-13 May was still present, while on the other hand, people were rounded-up and detained without trial – SUPP accepted the invitation to form a coalition government to stabilise the situation. In exchange, the government agreed to SUPP demand that party secretary-general Stephen Yong be appointed to the State Operations Committee (the security directorate) so that the party can influence counter-insurgency operations to look after the welfare of SUPP detainees including Chinese settlers, in the resettlement centres. In the ensuing years, SUPP generally had wide support at the polls even during the 2008 Malaysian general election where most of its allies suffered.

However, it is no stranger to major setbacks at the polls: In the 1996 Sarawak election, its then president, the late Wong Soon Kai was defeated and thereafter decided to retire from politics. A similar situation happened in 2011 Sarawak election when the then party president, George Chan Hong Nam was unseated. It also lost at the Sibu by-election of 2010. In the 2013 Malaysian general election, the party won only 1 out of 7 seats contested. Not long after, Wong Soon Koh, who was then the deputy secretary-general, left with his faction and eventually set up a separate splinter-party with a similar-sounding name, called United People's Party (UPP).

A positive turnaround was marked in the 2016 Sarawak election when SUPP, with current party president Sim Kui Hian at the helm, went on to win 7 seats out of 15 contested. After establishing new leadership line-up and reforms including amending the party constitution to limit the tenure of the president himself, the party placed renewed focus on the pursuit of more Sarawakian autonomous power and rights within Malaysia based on the unique contexts of the federation's formation, as originally outlined in the Malaysia Agreement 1963, Inter-Governmental Committee Report, and the Report of the Cobbold Commission.

SUPP and MCA attended video conference of the CPC and World Political Parties Summit organised by the Chinese Communist Party in 2021. 2021 Sarawak state election marked resurgence of SUPP with some urban seats it won over from opposition.

== Organisational structure ==
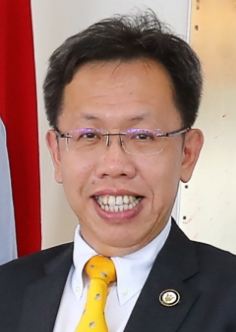
Sim Kui Hian, current President of SUPP

=== Central Working Committee (2025–2027) ===
- President:
  - Sim Kui Hian
- Deputy Presidents:
  - Richard Riot Jaem
  - Lee Kim Shin
- Vice Presidents:
  - Ding Kuong Hiing
  - Huang Tiong Sii
  - Michael Tiang Ming Tee
  - Joseph Chieng Jin Ek
- Chairman of Youth Section:
  - Kevin Lau Kor Jie
- Chairwoman of Women Section:
  - Kho Teck Wan
- Secretary-General:
  - Sebastian Ting Chiew Yew
- Deputy Secretaries-General:
  - Lo Khere Chiang
  - Johnny Pang Leong Ming
- Treasurer:
  - Francis Harden Hollis
- Assistant Treasurer:
  - Wilfred Yap Yau Sin
- Organising Secretary:
  - Matthew Chen Thin Kong
- Assistant Organising Secretary:
  - Billy Sujang
- Information and Publicity Secretary:
  - Adam Yii Siew Sang
- Assistant Information and Publicity Secretary:
  - Wong Ching Yong
- Members elected by Central Committee:
  - Robert Lau Hui Yew
  - Sih Hua Tong
  - Lim Ah Ted
  - Andrew Victor Nub William Tanyuh
  - Kua Jack Seng
  - Jong Yean Pin
- Members appointed from Non-Constituency Branches:
  - Michael Tiong Hok Choon
  - Danny Banjang
  - Calvin Goh Chin Seng
- Members appointed by Party President:
  - Chua Beng Seng
  - Wong Zee Yeng

== Elected representatives ==
=== Dewan Negara (Senate) ===
==== Senators ====
- His Majesty's appointee:
  - Robert Lau Hui Yew

=== Dewan Rakyat (House of Representatives) ===
==== Members of Parliament of the 15th Malaysian Parliament ====
SUPP only has 2 MP in the House of Representatives.

State	No.	Parliament Constituency	Member	Party
Sarawak	P199	Serian	Richard Riot Jaem	SUPP
Sarawak	P208	Sarikei	Huang Tiong Sii	SUPP
Total	Sarawak (2)			

=== Dewan Undangan Negeri (State Legislative Assembly) ===
==== Malaysian State Assembly Representatives ====
Sarawak State Legislative Assembly

13 / 82

State	No.	Parliamentary Constituency	No.	State Constituency	Member	Party
Sarawak	P192	Mas Gading	N1	Opar	Bily Sujang	SUPP
Sarawak	P196	Stampin	N12	Kota Sentosa	Wilfred Yap Yau Sin	SUPP
Sarawak	P196	Stampin	N13	Batu Kitang	Lo Khere Chiang	SUPP
Sarawak	P196	Stampin	N14	Batu Kawah	Sim Kui Hian	SUPP
Sarawak	P202	Sri Aman	N32	Simanggang	Francis Harden Hollis	SUPP
Sarawak	P208	Sarikei	N45	Repok	Huang Tiong Sii	SUPP
Sarawak	P208	Sarikei	N46	Meradong	Ding Kuong Hiing	SUPP
Sarawak	P211	Lanang	N51	Bukit Assek	Joseph Chieng Jin Ek	SUPP
Sarawak	P212	Sibu	N54	Pelawan	Michael Tiang Ming Tee	SUPP
Sarawak	P217	Bintulu	N68	Tanjong Batu	Johnny Pang Leong Ming	SUPP
Sarawak	P219	Miri	N73	Piasau	Sebastian Ting Chiew Yew	SUPP
Sarawak	P219	Miri	N74	Pujut	Adam Yii Siew Sang	SUPP
Sarawak	P219	Miri	N75	Senadin	Lee Kim Shin	SUPP
Total	Sarawak (13)					

== Government offices ==
=== Ministerial posts ===
Portfolio	Office Bearer	Constituency
Deputy Minister of Plantation Industries and Commodities	Huang Tiong Sii	Sarikei

=== State governments ===
State	Leader type	Member	State Constituency
Sarawak	Deputy Premier III	Sim Kui Hian	Batu Kawah

Since post-election talks after 1969 Sarawak state election SUPP took part as junior partner in PBB-led governments

- Sarawak (1970–present)

Note: bold as Premier/Chief Minister, italic as junior partner

== Election results ==
=== General election results ===
Election	Total seats won	Seats contested	Total votes	Share of votes	Outcome of election	Election leader
1964	3 / 159	12	Appointed by Council Negri		▲3 seats; Opposition	Ong Kee Hui
1969	5 / 144	12	71,293	2.97%	▲2 seats; Opposition, later Governing coalition (allied with Alliance Party)	Ong Kee Hui
1974	7 / 144	7	64,235		▲2 seats; Governing coalition (Barisan Nasional)	Ong Kee Hui
1978	6 / 154	7	52,222		▼1 seat; Governing coalition (Barisan Nasional)	Ong Kee Hui
1982	5 / 154	7	81,993		▼1 seat; Governing coalition (Barisan Nasional)	Stephen Yong Kuet Tze
1986	4 / 177	7	93,018	1.96%	▼1 seat; Governing coalition (Barisan Nasional)	Stephen Yong Kuet Tze
1990	4 / 180	7	102,687		; Governing coalition (Barisan Nasional)	Wong Soon Kai
1995	7 / 192	7	116,403		▲3 seats; Governing coalition (Barisan Nasional)	Wong Soon Kai
1999	7 / 193	7	129,356		; Governing coalition (Barisan Nasional)	George Chan Hong Nam
2004	6 / 219	7	101,869	1.46%	▼1 seat; Governing coalition (Barisan Nasional)	George Chan Hong Nam
2008	6 / 222	7	119,264	1.50%	; Governing coalition (Barisan Nasional)	George Chan Hong Nam
2013	1 / 222	7	133,603	1.21%	▼5 seats; Governing coalition (Barisan Nasional)	Peter Chin Fah Kui
2018	1 / 222	7	122,540	1.01%	; Opposition coalition (Barisan Nasional), later Governing coalition (Gabungan Parti Sarawak)	Sim Kui Hian
2022	2 / 222	7	167,063	1.08%	▲1 seat; Governing coalition (Gabungan Parti Sarawak)	Sim Kui Hian

=== State election results ===
Sarawak State Legislative Assembly
Election	Votes		Seats			Position (Note: As part of electoral coalition.)	Status
Election	Count	%	Result	Won / contested	+/–	Position	Status
1969/1970	72,178	28.8	12 / 48	12 / 40	▲12	2nd	Alliance–SUPP–Pesaka
1974	54,958	21.1	12 / 48	12 / 15	Steady	▲1st (Barisan Nasional)	BN
1979	64,746	20.3	11 / 48	11 / 12	▼1	1st (Barisan Nasional)	BN
1983	89,161	24.7	11 / 48	11 / 12	Steady	1st (Barisan Nasional)	BN (Note: BN–PBDS–SNAP (1983–1984))
1987	117,058	25.9	11 / 48	11 / 14	Steady	1st (Barisan Nasional)	BN
1991	126,107	26.3	16 / 56	16 / 17	▲5	1st (Barisan Nasional)	BN
1996	109,785	30.1	13 / 62	13 / 17	▼3	1st (Barisan Nasional)	BN
2001	143,593	26.7	16 / 62	16 / 17	▲3	1st (Barisan Nasional)	BN
2006	113,505	20.9	11 / 71	11 / 19	▼5	1st (Barisan Nasional)	BN
2011	111,860	16.6	6 / 71	6 / 19	▼5	1st (Barisan Nasional)	BN (Note: BN–TERAS–UPP (2013–2016))
2016	88,203	11.5	7 / 82	7 / 13	▲1	1st (Barisan Nasional)	BN (2016–2018) (Note: BN–UPP (2016–2018))
2016	88,203	11.5	7 / 82	7 / 13	▲1	1st (Barisan Nasional)	GPS (2018–2021) (Note: GPS–PSB (2018–2019), GPS–PN (2020–2021))
2021	100,047	13.4	13 / 82	13 / 18	▲6	1st (Gabungan Parti Sarawak)	GPS (Note: GPS–PSB (2023–2024))

== See also ==
- List of political parties in Malaysia
