= Michael Tiang Ming Tee =

Malaysian politician

Yang Berhormat Datuk Michael Tiang Ming Tee PGBK PBS MLA
- 程明智

Ministerial roles (Sarawak)
- 2022—: Deputy Minister for Public Health, Housing and Local Government

Faction represented in Sarawak State Legislative Assembly
- 2021—: Gabungan Parti Sarawak

Personal details
- Born: 23 April 1973 (age 53) Sibu, Sarawak, Malaysia
- Citizenship: Malaysian
- Party: Democratic Action Party (DAP) (until 2005); Sarawak United Peoples' Party (SUPP) (since 2005)
- Other political affiliations: Barisan Alternatif (BA) (until 2004); Barisan Nasional (BN) (2005–2018); Gabungan Parti Sarawak (GPS) (since 2018)
- Spouse: Lily Wong
- Children: 2
- Education: Cardiff University
- Occupation: Politician
- Profession: Lawyer

Michael Tiang Ming Tee (Chinese: 程明智; pinyin: Chéng Míngzhì; born 23 April 1973) is a Malaysian politician and lawyer who has served as Member of the Sarawak State Legislative Assembly (MLA) for Pelawan since December 2021. He has served as the State Deputy Minister of Public Health and Housing under Premier Abang Abdul Rahman Zohari Abang Openg since January 2022. He is a member of the Sarawak United Peoples' Party (SUPP), a component party of the ruling Gabungan Parti Sarawak (GPS) coalition in Sarawak. He was a member of the Democratic Action Party (DAP) until 2005, when he announced his departure from the party.

== Election results ==
Parliament of Malaysia
| Year | Constituency | Candidate | Votes | Pct | Opponent(s) | Votes | Pct | Majority | Ballots cast | Turnout |
|---|---|---|---|---|---|---|---|---|---|---|
| 1999 | P181 Sarikei | Michael Tiang Ming Tee (DAP) | 7,849 | 33.75% | Law Hieng Ding (SUPP) | 15,212 | 54.41% | 7,363 | 23,258 | 70.32% |
| 1999 | P181 Sarikei | Michael Tiang Ming Tee (DAP) | 7,849 | 33.75% | Yii Chu Lik (IND) | 197 | 0.85% | 7,363 | 23,258 | 70.32% |

Sarawak State Legislative Assembly
| Year | Constituency | Candidate | Votes | Pct | Opponent(s) | Votes | Pct | Ballots cast | Majority | Turnout |
|---|---|---|---|---|---|---|---|---|---|---|
| 2001 | N53 Bawang Assan | Michael Tiang Ming Tee (DAP) | 2,369 | 20.02% | Wong Soon Koh (SUPP) | 9,465 | 79.98% | 11,920 | 7,096 | 68.85% |
| 2021 | N54 Pelawan | Michael Tiang Ming Tee (SUPP) | 4,413 | 27.70% | David Wong Kee Woan (DAP) | 4,313 | 27.07% | | 100 | |
| 2021 | N54 Pelawan | Michael Tiang Ming Tee (SUPP) | 4,413 | 27.70% | Low Chong Nguan (PSB) | 3,757 | 23.58% | | 100 | |
| 2021 | N54 Pelawan | Michael Tiang Ming Tee (SUPP) | 4,413 | 27.70% | Tiew Yen Houng (PBK) | 3,146 | 19.75% | | 100 | |
| 2021 | N54 Pelawan | Michael Tiang Ming Tee (SUPP) | 4,413 | 27.70% | Janet Loh (ASPIRASI) | 302 | 1.9% | | 100 | |

== Honours ==
=== Honours of Malaysia ===
- Sarawak
  - Commander of the Order of the Star of Hornbill Sarawak (PGBK) – Datuk (2023)
  - Officer of the Most Exalted Order of the Star of Sarawak (PBS) (2021)
