= Alan Ling =

Malaysian politician and lawyer

- 林思健

Senator
- In office 27 August 2018 – 26 August 2021
- Monarchs: Muhammad V (2018–2019); Abdullah (2019–2021)
- Prime Minister: Mahathir Mohamad (2018–2020); Muhyiddin Yassin (2020–2021); Ismail Sabri Yaakob (2021)

Member of the Sarawak State Legislative Assembly for Piasau
- In office 16 April 2011 – 7 May 2016
- Preceded by: George Chan Hong Nam
- Succeeded by: Sebastian Ting Chiew Yew
- Majority: 1,590 (2011)

Personal details
- Born: 19 February 1983 (age 43) Sibu, Sarawak, Malaysia
- Party: Democratic Action Party (DAP)
- Other political affiliations: Pakatan Harapan (PH)
- Education: University of Sheffield
- Occupation: Lawyer, businessman

Alan Ling

Chinese name
- Traditional Chinese: 林思健
- Simplified Chinese: 林思健
Transcriptions
Standard Mandarin
- Hanyu Pinyin: Lín Sījiàn
Hakka
- Pha̍k-fa-sṳ: Lìm Sû-khien
Yue: Cantonese
- Jyutping: Lam4 Si1 Gin6
Southern Min
- Hokkien POJ: Lîm Su-kiān
- Tâi-lô: Lîm Su-kiān

Alan Ling Sie Kiong (Chinese: 林思健; pinyin: Lín Sījiàn; Jyutping: Lam4 Si1 Gin6; Pe̍h-ōe-jī: Lîm Su-kiān; born 19 February 1983) is a Malaysian politician and lawyer who served as Senator from August 2018 to August 2021 and Member of the Sarawak State Legislative Assembly (MLA) for Piasau from April 2011 to May 2016. He is the State Secretary of Sarawak of both the Democratic Action Party (DAP) as well as its coalition, the state opposition Pakatan Harapan (PH) coalition.

== Early life ==
He spent his childhood in Nanga Medamit, Limbang, Sarawak where his parents started their first business venture by operating a small grocery shops next to a river in the rural area. He is a Christian.

Ling received his primary education in SRB Chung Hua Limbang, North School Miri and secondary school in SMK St. Joseph Miri.

Ling graduated from the University of Sheffield with a Bachelor of Laws honours degree. During his stay in United Kingdom, he was the President of Malaysian Law Students Union in the United Kingdom and Eire (KPUM) for the term 2004/2005. He also held the post of President for Malaysian Chinese Association (MCA) Club of United Kingdom for the term 2005/2006.

== Career ==
Ling is an Advocate & Solicitor of the High Court in Malaya and High Court in Sabah and Sarawak. He became the managing partner of an established law firm Suhaili & Ling Advocates in Miri at the age of 27. He has particular interest in criminal law and was a pupil to the late Karpal Singh. He is also the partner of Rohamat & Ling which is situated in Petaling Jaya and Johor Bahru in West Malaysia. He is a well-known lawyer in Miri and has been appointed honourable/legal advisors to several associations in Miri.

Besides legal qualification, he is a licensed auctioneer, company secretary and also actively involved in the business field since his university time. At the age of 25 in 2008, he successfully obtained license from Bank Negara Malaysia to operate remittance business in partnership with Western Union, it is one of the pioneers non-bank remittance operators in Malaysia. In 2015, he sold the company operation to another remittance operator.

Ling joined DAP in 2011 and had been elected Honourable Member of the Sarawak State Legislative Assembly for Piasau. He won the seat at the age of 28 by upsetting the then Sarawak Deputy Chief Minister cum President of Sarawak United People's Party (SUPP) of Barisan Nasional (BN), Tan Sri Dr George Chan Hong Nam in the 2011 state election. He defeated Chan by a 1,590-vote majority. He has a community centre within his constituency. He seek for re-election in 2016 state election but lost to BN SUPP candidate. His focus is now on his legal practice, business interest and party works.

Currently he is also one of the board members to Malaysian Palm Oil Board (MPOB). Ling was appointed and sworn in as Malaysian Senator in Dewan Negara on 27 August 2018.

In June 2019, Ling was appointed as president of Miri Volleyball Association (MVA).

== Election results ==
Sarawak State Legislative Assembly
Year	Constituency	Candidate	Votes	Pct	Opponent(s)	Votes	Pct	Turnout	Majority	Turnout
2011	N63 Piasau	Alan Ling Sie Kiong (DAP)	5,998	57.64%	George Chan Hong Nam (SUPP)	4,408	42.36%	10,479	1,590	63.13%
2016	N73 Piasau	Alan Ling Sie Kiong (DAP)	5,687	42.17%	Sebastian Ting Chiew Yew (SUPP)	7,799	57.83%	13,634	2,112	64.55%
