= Pujut =

State constituency in Sarawak, Malaysia

Pujut (N74)
Sarawak constituency

State constituency
- Legislature: Sarawak State Legislative Assembly
MLA
Vacant
- Constituency created: 2005
- First contested: 2006
- Last contested: 2026

Pujut is a state constituency in Sarawak, Malaysia, that has been represented in the Sarawak State Legislative Assembly since 2006.

The state constituency was created in the 2005 redistribution and is mandated to return a single member to the Sarawak State Legislative Assembly under the first past the post voting system. This is smallest elector district in Malaysia only just two districts.

== Demographics ==
Ethnic breakdown of Pujut's electorate as of 2022
1. Chinese (60.0%)
2. Malay-Muslim bumiputera (24.6%)
3. Sarawak bumiputera (14.6%)
4. Other ethnicities (1.70%)

== History ==
As of 2025, Pujut has a population of 39,500 people.

=== Polling districts ===
According to the gazette issued on 31 October 2022, the Pujut constituency has a total of 2 polling districts.

State constituency	Polling Districts	Code	Location
Pujut (N74)	Pujut	219/74/01	Tadika Miri Chinese; SR Sri Mawar; SK Anchi; Tadika Pujut Miri; SK Pujut Corner Pujut; SJK (C) Chung Hua Pujut Miri; SMK Dato Permaisuri Piassau Jaya
Pujut (N74)	Krokop	219/74/02	Kolej Vokesional Miri; SJK (C) Chung Hua Krokop; SM Pei Min; SK Miri

=== Representation history ===
Members of the Legislative Assembly for Pujut
Assembly	No	Years	Member	Party
Constituency created from Piasau and Senadin
16th	N64	2006-2011	Chia Chu Fatt (謝超發)	BN (SUPP)
17th	N64	2011-2016	Fong Pau Teck (房保德)	PR (DAP)
18th	N74	2016–2020	Ting Tiong Choon (陳長鋒)	PH (DAP)
18th	N74	2020-2021	Vacant (Note: Vacant from 11 February 2020 until the 2021 state election due to the incumbent was disqualified for having Malaysian and Australian dual citizenship. No by-election was held due to the state assembly was to automatically dissolved in less than a year and a half.)	
19th	N74	2021-2026	Adam Yii Siew Sang (俞小珊)	GPS (SUPP)

== Election results ==
Sarawak state election, 2026: Pujut
Party	Candidate	Votes	%	∆%
GPS				▲
PH				▲
PBK	Leslie Ting Siong Ngiap			▲
Total valid votes				
Total rejected ballots				
Unreturned ballots				
Turnout				
Registered electors				
Majority				

Sarawak state election, 2021: Pujut
Party	Candidate	Votes	%	∆%
GPS	Adam Yii	5,558	44.86	▲44.86
DAP	Alan Ling Sie Kiong	3,992	32.22	▼20.35
PSB	Bruce Chai Khim Cheong	1,667	13.45	▲13.45
PBK	Leslie Ting Siong Ngiap	1,022	8.25	▲8.25
ASPIRASI	Erick Chin Fen Siong	152	1.23	▲1.23
Total valid votes		12,391	100.00	
Total rejected ballots		96		
Unreturned ballots		60		
Turnout		12,547	45.51	▼19.74
Registered electors		27,567		
Majority		1,566	12.64	▲2.25
GPS gain from DAP		Swing		?
Source(s) https://lom.agc.gov.my/ilims/upload/portal/akta/outputp/1718688/PUB687.pdf

Sarawak state election, 2016: Pujut
Party	Candidate	Votes	%	∆%
DAP	Ting Tiong Choon	8,899	52.57	▼11.29
BN	Hii King Chiong	7,140	42.18	▲6.04
PAS	Jofri Jaraiee	513	3.03	▲3.03
Independent	Fong Pau Teck	375	2.22	▲2.22
Total valid votes		16,927	100.00	
Total rejected ballots		139		
Unreturned ballots		32		
Turnout		17,098	65.25	▼0.75
Registered electors		26,202		
Majority		1,759	10.39	▼17.33
DAP hold		Swing		
Source(s) "Federal Government Gazette - Notice of Contested Election, State Legislative Assembly of the State of Sarawak [P.U. (B) 190/2016]" (PDF). Attorney General's Chambers of Malaysia. 25 April 2016. Archived from the original (PDF) on 12 June 2017. "Senarai Calon yang Disahkan Layak Bertanding Pilihan Raya Dewan Undangan Negeri ke-11". Election Commission of Malaysia. 25 April 2016. Archived from the original on 25 April 2016.

Sarawak state election, 2011: Pujut
Party	Candidate	Votes	%	∆%
DAP	Fong Pau Teck	9,453	63.86	▲19.76
BN	Chia Chu Fatt	5,350	36.14	▼19.76
Total valid votes		14,803	100.00	
Total rejected ballots		67		
Unreturned ballots		30		
Turnout		14,900	66.00	▲7.35
Registered electors		22,577		
Majority		4,103	27.72	▲15.93
DAP gain from BN		Swing		?
Source(s) "Federal Government Gazette - Results of Contested Election and Statements of the Poll after the Official Addition of Votes Sarawak [P.U. (B) 245/2011]" (PDF). Attorney General's Chambers of Malaysia. 29 April 2011.

Sarawak state election, 2006: Pujut
Party	Candidate	Votes	%
BN	Chia Chu Fatt	6,493	55.90
DAP	Fong Pau Teck	5,123	44.10
Total valid votes		11,616	100.00
Total rejected ballots		77	
Unreturned ballots		96	
Turnout		11,789	58.65
Registered electors		20,098	
Majority		1,370	11.79
This was a new constituency created.
