= George Chan Hong Nam =

Former Deputy Chief Minister of Sarawak

Yang Berbahagia Datuk Patinggi Tan Sri Dr George Chan Hong Nam PSM DP DA PNBS KMN
- 陈康南
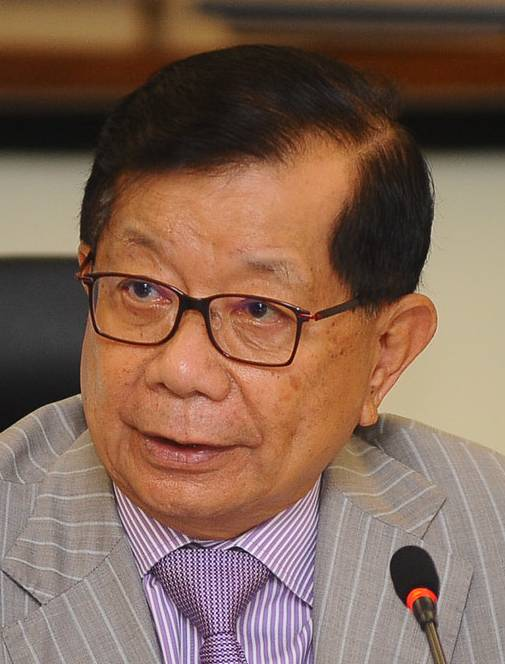
- Chan (right) in 2005

Deputy Chief Minister of Sarawak
- In office 9 September 1996 – 16 April 2011
- Governor: Ahmad Zaidi Adruce; Abang Muhammad Salahuddin
- Chief Minister: Abdul Taib Mahmud
- Preceded by: Wong Soon Kai

President of the Sarawak United Peoples' Party
- In office 1997–2011
- Preceded by: Wong Soon Kai
- Succeeded by: Peter Chin Fah Kui

Member of the Sarawak State Legislative Assembly for Piasau
- In office 8 December 1983 – 16 April 2011
- Preceded by: Constituency established
- Succeeded by: Alan Ling Sie Kiong (DAP – PR)
- Majority: 9,063 (1991); 5,191 (1996); 7,673 (2001); 3,918 (2006)

Personal details
- Born: 24 September 1936 (age 89) (Raj of Sarawak) Miri, Kingdom of Sarawak (now Sarawak, Malaysia)
- Citizenship: Malaysian
- Party: Sarawak United Peoples' Party (SUPP)
- Other political affiliations: Barisan Nasional (BN) Gabungan Parti Sarawak (GPS)
- Spouse(s): Judith Chan (divorced); Lorna Enan Muloon (present)
- Children: 4 daughters

George Chan Hong Nam

Chinese name
- Traditional Chinese: 陳康南
- Simplified Chinese: 陈康南
Transcriptions
Standard Mandarin
- Hanyu Pinyin: Chén Kāngnán
Yue: Cantonese
- Jyutping: Can4 Hong1 Naam4

George Chan Hong Nam (simplified Chinese: 陈康南; traditional Chinese: 陳康南; pinyin: Chén Kāngnán; Jyutping: Can4 Hong1 Naam4; born 24 September 1936), is a Malaysian medical doctor who is the former Deputy Chief Minister of Sarawak, state Industrial Development Minister and state Tourism and Heritage Minister. He is the former member of the Sarawak State Legislative Assembly for Piasau, Miri after having lost his seat to the Democratic Action Party in the 2011 Sarawak State Election. He is also former President and current Honorary President of the Sarawak United Peoples' Party (SUPP).

After losing state election in his constituency, he had sent a resignation letter to the party but was asked by the central committee members to stay on until the party's Triennial Delegates Conference (TDC) which was held in December 2011.

== Personal life ==
Chan is divorced from his American wife of Irish descent, Judith Chan. The couple has four daughters. One of their daughters, Anisa Chan is married to Sarawak Chief Minister Pehin Sri Abdul Taib Mahmud's son Sulaiman Abdul Rahman Taib.

Chan received his primary education in Miri at St. Joseph's Primary School and his secondary education in Kuching at St. Joseph's Secondary School Kuching. After his senior Cambridge examination he left for Australia under the Colombo Plan scholarship to do medicine at the University of Sydney and graduated with an MBBS in 1963.

Chan married Wira Lorna Enan Muloon, the adopted daughter of the late Joseph Balan Seling in 2009, in a private ceremony.

== Election results ==
Sarawak State Legislative Assembly
Year	Constituency	Candidate	Votes	Pct	Opponent(s)	Votes	Pct	Turnout	Majority	Turnout
1983	N44 Miri	George Chan Hong Nam (SUPP)								
1987	N44 Miri	George Chan Hong Nam (SUPP)								
1991	N52 Piasau	George Chan Hong Nam (SUPP)	13,634	74.89%	Chong Kon Fatt (DAP)	4,571	25.11%	18,477	9,063	60.47%
1996	N56 Piasau	George Chan Hong Nam (SUPP)	8,737	71.13%	John Law Ching Sing (DAP)	3,546	28.87%	12,435	5,191	58.90%
2001	N56 Piasau	George Chan Hong Nam (SUPP)	10,237	79.97%	John Law Ching Sing (DAP)	2,564	20.03%	12,921	7,673	60.66%
2006	N63 Piasau	George Chan Hong Nam (SUPP)	6,573	71.23%	Ngu Hee Hieng (PKR)	2,655	28.77%	9,334	3,918	54.09%
2011	N63 Piasau	George Chan Hong Nam (SUPP)	4,408	42.36%	Alan Ling Sie Kiong (DAP)	5,998	57.64%	10,479	1,590	63.13%

== Honours ==
=== Honours of Malaysia ===
- Malaysia
  - Officer of the Order of the Defender of the Realm (KMN) (1979)
  - Commander of the Order of Loyalty to the Crown of Malaysia (PSM) – Tan Sri (2000)
- Sarawak
  - Knight Commander of the Order of the Star of Sarawak (PNBS) – Dato Sri (1990)
  - Knight Commander of the Order of the Star of Hornbill Sarawak (DA) – Datuk Amar (1998)
  - Knight Grand Commander of the Order of the Star of Hornbill Sarawak (DP) – Datuk Patinggi (2005)
