= Adam Yii Siew Sang =

Malaysian politician

Yang Berhormat Adam Yii Siew Sang MLA
- 俞小珊

Mayor of Miri City
- Incumbent
- Assumed office 26 July 2016
- Governor: Abdul Taib Mahmud Wan Junaidi Tuanku Jaafar
- Premier: Adenan Satem Abang Abdul Rahman Johari Abang Openg
- Preceded by: Lawrence Lai Yew Son

Member of the Sarawak State Legislative Assembly for Pujut
- Incumbent
- Assumed office 18 December 2021
- Preceded by: Ting Tiong Choon (PH-DAP)
- Majority: 1,566 (2021)

Personal details
- Born: Adam Yii Siew Sang Crown Colony of Sarawak (now Sarawak, Malaysia)
- Citizenship: Malaysian
- Party: Sarawak United Peoples' Party (SUPP)
- Other political affiliations: Barisan Nasional (BN) (-2018); Gabungan Parti Sarawak (GPS) (since 2018)
- Education: University of Malaya
- Occupation: Politician

Adam Yii Siew Sang (Chinese: 俞小珊; pinyin: Yú xiǎoshān) is a Malaysian politician from the Sarawak United Peoples' Party (SUPP), a component party of the ruling Gabungan Parti Sarawak (GPS) coalition. He has served as Mayor of Miri City since 26 July 2016 and Member of the Sarawak State Legislative Assembly (MLA) for Pujut since 18 December 2021.
