= 2016 Sarawak state election =

State election in Malaysia

- 7 May 2016

All 82 seats in the Legislative Assembly 42 seats needed for a majority
- Registered: 1,138,650
- Turnout: 70.01%
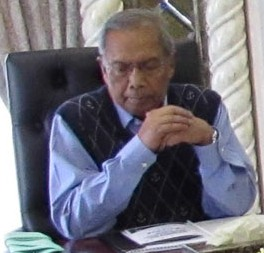

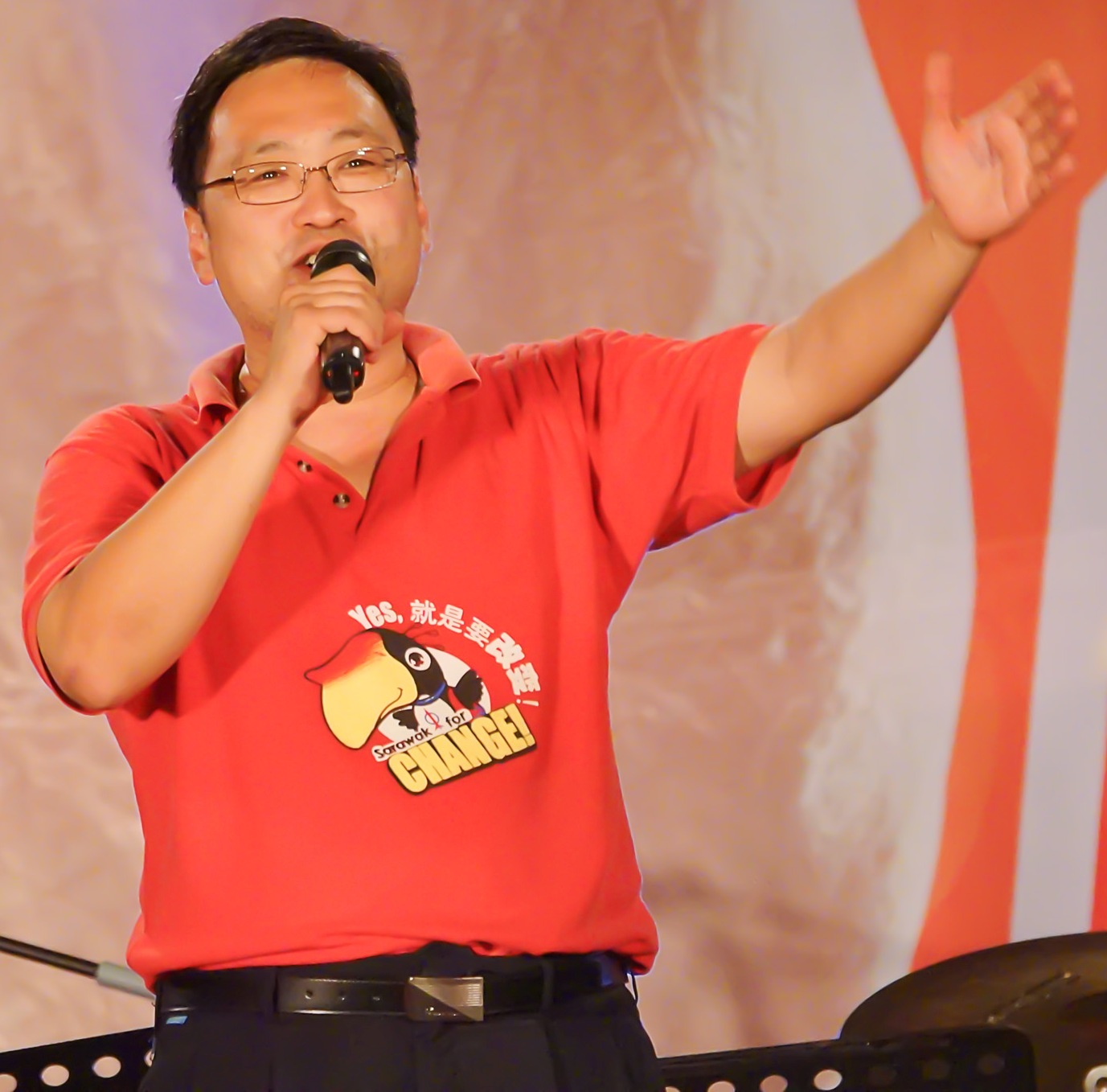
	Majority party	Minority party
Leader	Adenan Satem	Chong Chieng Jen
Party	PBB	DAP
Alliance	Barisan Nasional	Pakatan Harapan
Leader since	1 March 2014	10 June 2013
Leader's seat	Tanjong Datu	Kota Sentosa
Last election	55 seats, 55.36%	New (Note: Pakatan Harapan was a new coalition formed between DAP, PKR and AMANAH (which is a new party) in 2015. DAP and PKR held a total of 15 seats in the last election.)
Seats before	55	14
Seats won	72	10
Seat change	▲17	▼4
Popular vote	474,953	230,309
Percentage	62.19%	30.16%
Swing	▲6.83 pp	▼9.63 pp
Chief Minister before election
Adenan Satem
BN–PBB
Chief Minister-designate
Adenan Satem
BN–PBB

The eleventh Sarawak state election was held on Saturday, 7 May 2016 after nomination for candidates on Monday, 25 April 2016. The 82 members of the Sarawak State Legislative Assembly, were elected in single-member constituencies using first-past-the-post voting. More than 1.1 million who had their names entered or retained in an electoral register for a particular electoral district in Sarawak was eligible to vote at the time of the election. Malaysia does not practice compulsory voting and automatic voter registration. The voting age is 21 although the age of majority in the country is 18. The election was conducted by the Election Commission of Malaysia.

The Sarawak State Legislative Assembly would automatically dissolve on 20 June 2016, the fifth anniversary of the first sitting, and elections must be held within sixty days of the dissolution (on or before 19 August 2016, with the date to be decided by the Election Commission), unless dissolved prior to that date by the Yang di-Pertua Negeri of Sarawak on the advice of the Chief Minister of Sarawak.

The previous state election was held at 2011. The state assemblymen is elected to 5 years term each. It is expected to be the most hotly contested election in Sarawak's poll history. At the previous election, the opposition coalition Pakatan Rakyat made historic gains by doubling its State Assembly seats, while the ruling coalition Barisan Nasional retained a two-thirds majority.

The incumbent Chief Minister Adenan Satem first announced the election during a party branch meeting on 29 January, speculating 18 April as the nomination day and 30 April as election day. However, Adenan said the final decision was up to the Election Commission.

On 14 April, the Election Commission announced that the election will be held on 7 May, with 12 days of campaigning and the nomination day set on 25 April. The legislative assembly was dissolved on Monday, 11 April.

== Timeline ==
Date	Event
11 April 2016	Dissolution of the 17th Legislative Assembly
14 April 2016	Issue of the writs of election
25 April 2016	Nomination day
25 April–6 May 2016	Campaigning period
3–6 May 2016	Early voting for postal, overseas and advance voters
7 May 2016	Election day

== Proposed Sarawak electoral districts ==
A proposal by the Election Commission to increase the number of state seats from 71 to 82 was challenged in the High Court and nullified. However this was overturned by the Court of Appeal reasoning that the increase in seats would not breach voters' constitutional rights and was in accordance with the 13th Schedule of the Federal Constitution.

The composition of seats by ethnic majority consists of 22 Dayak-Iban majority seats, 17 Muslim-Malay majority seats, 16 Chinese-majority seats, 9 Melanau-majority seats, 8 Dayak-Bidayuh majority seats, 6 Dayak-Orang Ulu majority seats, 2 Kedayan-majority seats, and 2 Brunei-Malay majority seats.

Electoral map of Sarawak, showing all 82 constituencies

Source: EC Full Report EC Notice EC Electoral District Map
Federal constituencies	Number of constituents 2015	State constituencies	Number of constituents 2015	Number of constituents 2016	Early votes	Postal votes	Ethnic Majority
P.192 Mas Gading	26,171	N.01 Opar	9,531	9,714	5	0	Bidayuh
P.192 Mas Gading	26,171	N.02 Tasik Biru	16,640	17,041	157	0	Bidayuh
P.193 Santubong	37,826	N.03 Tanjong Datu	9,301	9,899	186	0	Muslim-Malay
P.193 Santubong	37,826	N.04 Pantai Damai	16,160	18,409	29	1	Muslim-Malay
P.193 Santubong	37,826	N.05 Demak Laut	12,365	13,830	1	0	Muslim-Malay
P.194 Petra Jaya	51,987	N.06 Tupong	20,713	21,499	64	7	Muslim-Malay
P.194 Petra Jaya	51,987	N.07 Samariang	17,694	18,250	29	4	Muslim-Malay
P.194 Petra Jaya	51,987	N.08 Satok	13,580	13,550	786	7	Muslim-Malay
P.195 Bandar Kuching	81,992	N.09 Padungan	22,873	22,301	262	3	Chinese
P.195 Bandar Kuching	81,992	N.10 Pending	30,881	30,488	957	4	Chinese
P.195 Bandar Kuching	81,992	N.11 Batu Lintang; Previously under P.196 Stampin	28,238	28,105	75	13	Chinese
P.196 Stampin	58,111	N.12 Kota Sentosa	21,247	25,761	3,163	7	Chinese
P.196 Stampin	58,111	N.13 Batu Kitang; New state constituency established	20,819	17,494	39	4	Chinese
P.196 Stampin	58,111	N.14 Batu Kawah	16,045	16,991	1,241	8	Chinese
P.197 Kota Samarahan	39,029	N.15 Asajaya	10,706	10,967	23	0	Muslim-Malay
P.197 Kota Samarahan	39,029	N.16 Muara Tuang	15,562	16,186	267	1	Muslim-Malay
P.197 Kota Samarahan	39,029	N.17 Stakan; New state constituency established	12,761	14,846	7,055	0	Iban
P.198 Puncak Borneo; Renamed from Mambong	42,142	N.18 Serembu; New state constituency established	8,965	9,065	8	0	Bidayuh
P.198 Puncak Borneo; Renamed from Mambong	42,142	N.19 Mambong; Renamed from Bengoh	16,227	17,467	996	1	Bidayuh
P.198 Puncak Borneo; Renamed from Mambong	42,142	N.20 Tarat	16,950	16,391	13	0	Bidayuh
P.199 Serian	34,602	N.21 Tebedu	12,699	11,521	15	0	Bidayuh
P.199 Serian	34,602	N.22 Kedup	9,150	10,370	3	0	Bidayuh
P.199 Serian	34,602	N.23 Bukit Semuja; New state constituency established	12,753	13,365	191	1	Bidayuh
P.200 Batang Sadong	20,977	N.24 Sadong Jaya	6,752	6,749	1	0	Muslim-Malay
P.200 Batang Sadong	20,977	N.25 Simunjan	7,513	7,774	96	0	Muslim-Malay
P.200 Batang Sadong	20,977	N.26 Gedong; New state constituency established	6,712	7,087	1	0	Muslim-Malay
P.201 Batang Lupar	27,212	N.27 Sebuyau	8,804	9,041	7	0	Muslim-Malay
P.201 Batang Lupar	27,212	N.28 Lingga	8,731	8,988	3	0	Muslim-Malay
P.201 Batang Lupar	27,212	N.29 Beting Maro	9,677	10,474	0	0	Muslim-Malay
P.202 Sri Aman	30,443	N.30 Balai Ringin	9,811	9,945	4	1	Iban
P.202 Sri Aman	30,443	N.31 Bukit Begunan	9,266	9,389	1,075	0	Iban
P.202 Sri Aman	30,443	N.32 Simanggang	11,366	11,472	256	1	Iban
P.203 Lubok Antu	19,819	N.33 Engkilili	10,384	10,682	19	1	Iban
P.203 Lubok Antu	19,819	N.34 Batang Ai; Renamed from Batang Air	9,435	9,492	36	0	Iban
P.204 Betong	26,807	N.35 Saribas	9,296	9,879	3	0	Muslim-Malay
P.204 Betong	26,807	N.36 Layar	8,835	9,094	111	0	Iban
P.204 Betong	26,807	N.37 Bukit Saban	8,676	8,897	5	0	Iban
P.205 Saratok	28,175	N.38 Kalaka	7,324	7,327	110	0	Muslim-Malay
P.205 Saratok	28,175	N.39 Krian	11,694	11,959	0	0	Iban
P.205 Saratok	28,175	N.40 Kabong; New state constituency established	9,157	9,287	13	0	Muslim-Malay
P.206 Tanjong Manis	19,627	N.41 Kuala Rajang; Renamed from Belawai	9,995	10,256	7	2	Melanau
P.206 Tanjong Manis	19,627	N.42 Semop	9,632	9,617	0	0	Melanau
P.207 Igan	18,082	N.43 Daro	8,554	8,491	79	0	Melanau
P.207 Igan	18,082	N.44 Jemoreng	9,528	9,699	0	1	Melanau
P.208 Sarikei	37,083	N.45 Repok	20,282	20,263	236	0	Chinese
P.208 Sarikei	37,083	N.46 Meradong	16,801	16,882	71	0	Chinese
P.209 Julau	22,932	N.47 Pakan	9,923	10,322	0	1	Iban
P.209 Julau	22,932	N.48 Meluan	13,009	13,103	62	0	Iban
P.210 Kanowit	19,862	N.49 Ngemah	8,930	8,899	0	1	Iban
P.210 Kanowit	19,862	N.50 Machan	10,932	10,947	71	0	Iban
P.211 Lanang	57,477	N.51 Bukit Assek	28,908	28,341	0	1	Chinese
P.211 Lanang	57,477	N.52 Dudong	28,569	29,028	690	2	Chinese
P.212 Sibu	66,375	N.53 Bawang Assan	17,645	18,340	4	0	Chinese
P.212 Sibu	66,375	N.54 Pelawan	31,388	32,233	636	6	Chinese
P.212 Sibu	66,375	N.55 Nangka	17,342	18,605	3,043	1	Melanau
P.213 Mukah	27,167	N.56 Dalat	10,985	11,440	71	1	Melanau
P.213 Mukah	27,167	N.57 Tellian; New state constituency established	8,698	8,914	125	0	Melanau
P.213 Mukah	27,167	N.58 Balingian	7,484	7,967	4	0	Melanau
P.214 Selangau	27,071	N.59 Tamin	14,469	14,948	16	0	Iban
P.214 Selangau	27,071	N.60 Kakus	12,602	12,953	42	0	Iban
P.215 Kapit	27,899	N.61 Pelagus	6,839	7,186	0	0	Iban
P.215 Kapit	27,899	N.62 Katibas	9,601	9,666	40	0	Iban
P.215 Kapit	27,899	N.63 Bukit Goram; New state constituency established	11,459	11,510	68	0	Iban
P.216 Hulu Rajang	24,293	N.64 Baleh	9,427	9,624	0	0	Iban
P.216 Hulu Rajang	24,293	N.65 Belaga	7,218	7,096	69	0	Orang Ulu
P.216 Hulu Rajang	24,293	N.66 Murum; New state constituency established	7,648	8,242	0	0	Orang Ulu
P.217 Bintulu	57,887	N.67 Jepak	12,873	13,789	10	0	Melanau
P.217 Bintulu	57,887	N.68 Tanjong Batu; Renamed from Kidurong	19,289	19,674	270	2	Chinese
P.217 Bintulu	57,887	N.69 Kemena	12,798	13,991	0	0	Iban
P.217 Bintulu	57,887	N.70 Samalaju; New state constituency established	12,927	13,251	0	2	Iban
P.218 Sibuti	28,634	N.71 Bekenu	12,238	12,250	37	0	Kedayan
P.218 Sibuti	28,634	N.72 Lambir	16,396	17,533	695	3	Kedayan
P.219 Miri	74,861	N.73 Piasau	21,343	21,120	413	0	Chinese
P.219 Miri	74,861	N.74 Pujut	26,532	26,202	0	9	Chinese
P.219 Miri	74,861	N.75 Senadin	26,986	27,874	444	4	Chinese
P.220 Baram	31,476	N.76 Marudi	14,085	14,858	82	1	Iban
P.220 Baram	31,476	N.77 Telang Usan	9,343	10,000	12	0	Orang Ulu
P.220 Baram	31,476	N.78 Mulu; New state constituency established	8,048	8,600	0	0	Orang Ulu
P.221 Limbang	24,977	N.79 Bukit Kota	16,316	16,437	317	1	Brunei-Malay
P.221 Limbang	24,977	N.80 Batu Danau	8,661	8,657	2	2	Orang Ulu
P.222 Lawas	18,138	N.81 Ba'kelalan	7,087	7,375	0	0	Orang Ulu
P.222 Lawas	18,138	N.82 Bukit Sari	11,051	12,418	101	1	Brunei-Malay
Average	35,779	Average	13,524	13,898			
Total eligible voters	1,109,134	Total eligible voters	1,109,134	1,139,647	25,022	105	
Voting age population (aged 21 years and above):

== Political parties ==
Name		Ideology	Leading candidate(s)	2011 election results		Seats at dissolution	Cand.
Name		Ideology	Leading candidate(s)	Votes (%)	Seats	Seats at dissolution	Cand.
Barisan Nasional Sarawak (BN Sarawak)	Parti Pesaka Bumiputera Bersatu (PBB)	Bumiputera nationalism	Adenan Satem	55.36	55 / 71 (77%)	45 / 71 (63%)	82
Barisan Nasional Sarawak (BN Sarawak)	Parti Rakyat Sarawak (PRS)	Nationalism	James Jemut Masing	55.36	55 / 71 (77%)	45 / 71 (63%)	82
Barisan Nasional Sarawak (BN Sarawak)	Sarawak United Peoples' Party (SUPP)	Sarawak autonomism	Sim Kui Hian	55.36	55 / 71 (77%)	45 / 71 (63%)	82
Barisan Nasional Sarawak (BN Sarawak)	Sarawak Progressive Democratic Party (SPDP)	Sarawak regionalism	Tiong King Sing	55.36	55 / 71 (77%)	45 / 71 (63%)	82
Barisan Nasional Sarawak (BN Sarawak)	Non-Affiliated Direct Candidates (Note: Consists of 7 candidates from United People's Party (UPP) and 3 candidates each from Sarawak People's Energy Party (TERAS) and Parti Pesaka Bumiputera Bersatu (PBB). According to the BN constitution, any person contest as direct BN candidates must resign from their parties.)	–	–	55.36	55 / 71 (77%)	45 / 71 (63%)	82
Democratic Action Party (DAP)		Social democracy	Chong Chieng Jen	20.05 (Note: As part of electoral alliance – Pakatan Rakyat (People's Pact/People's Alliance))	12 / 71 (17%)	11 / 71 (15%)	31
People's Justice Party (PKR)		Social Justice	Baru Bian	30.16	3 / 71 (4%)	3 / 71 (4%)	40
National Trust Party (AMANAH)		Islamic modernism	Mohamad Fidzuan Zaidi	New Party		0 / 71 (0%)	13
Malaysian Islamic Party (PAS)		Islamism	Jofri Jaraiee	1.44	0 / 71 (0%)	0 / 71 (0%)	11
State Reform Party (STAR)		Sarawak regionalism	Lina Soo	New Party		0 / 71 (0%)	10
Parti Bansa Dayak Sarawak Baru (PBDSB)		Dayak nationalism	Patrick Uren	New Party		0 / 71 (0%)	5
Independents		–	–	2.98	1 / 71 (1%)	1 / 71 (1%)	36

== Campaign ==
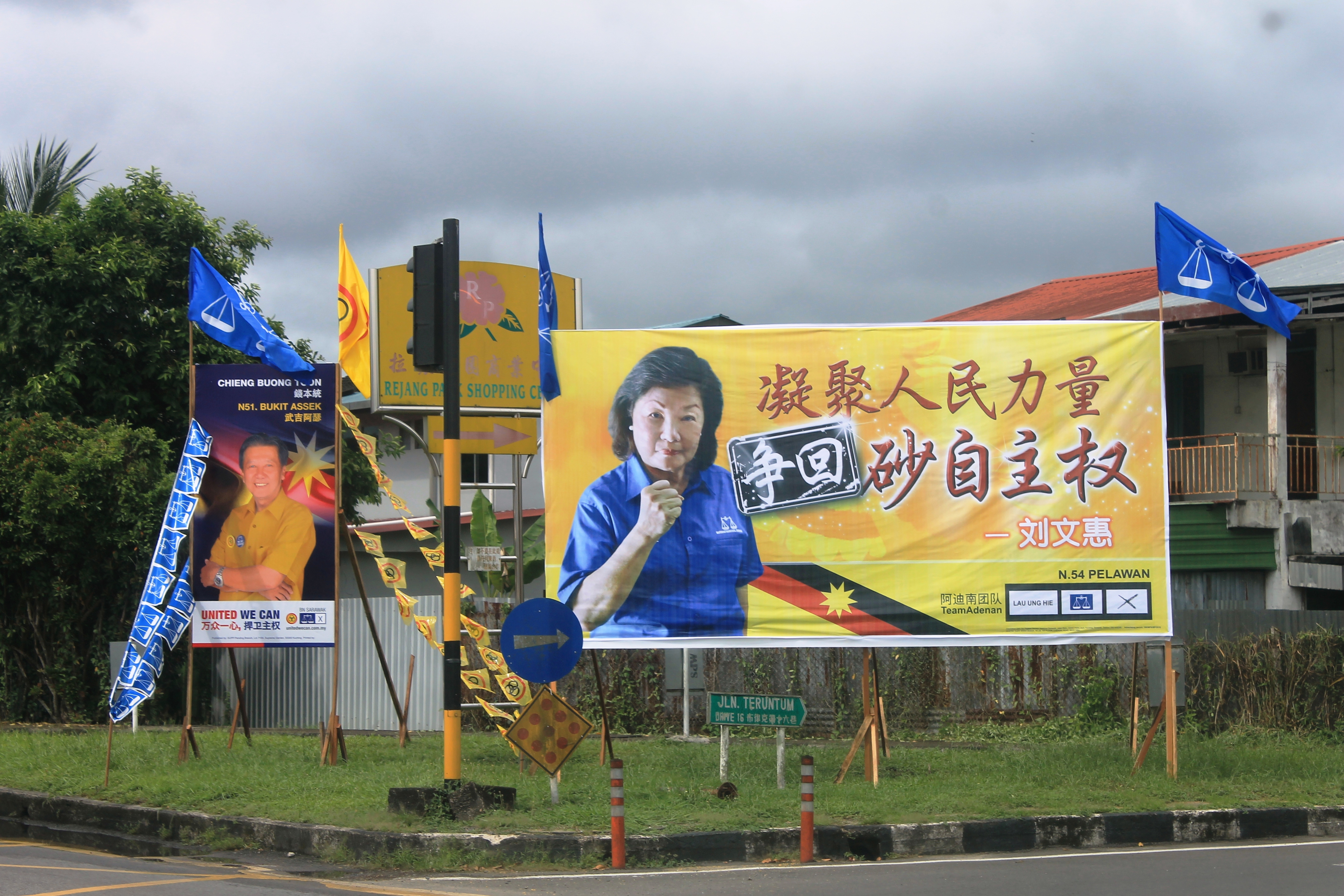
Barisan Nasional campaign posters in Sibu.

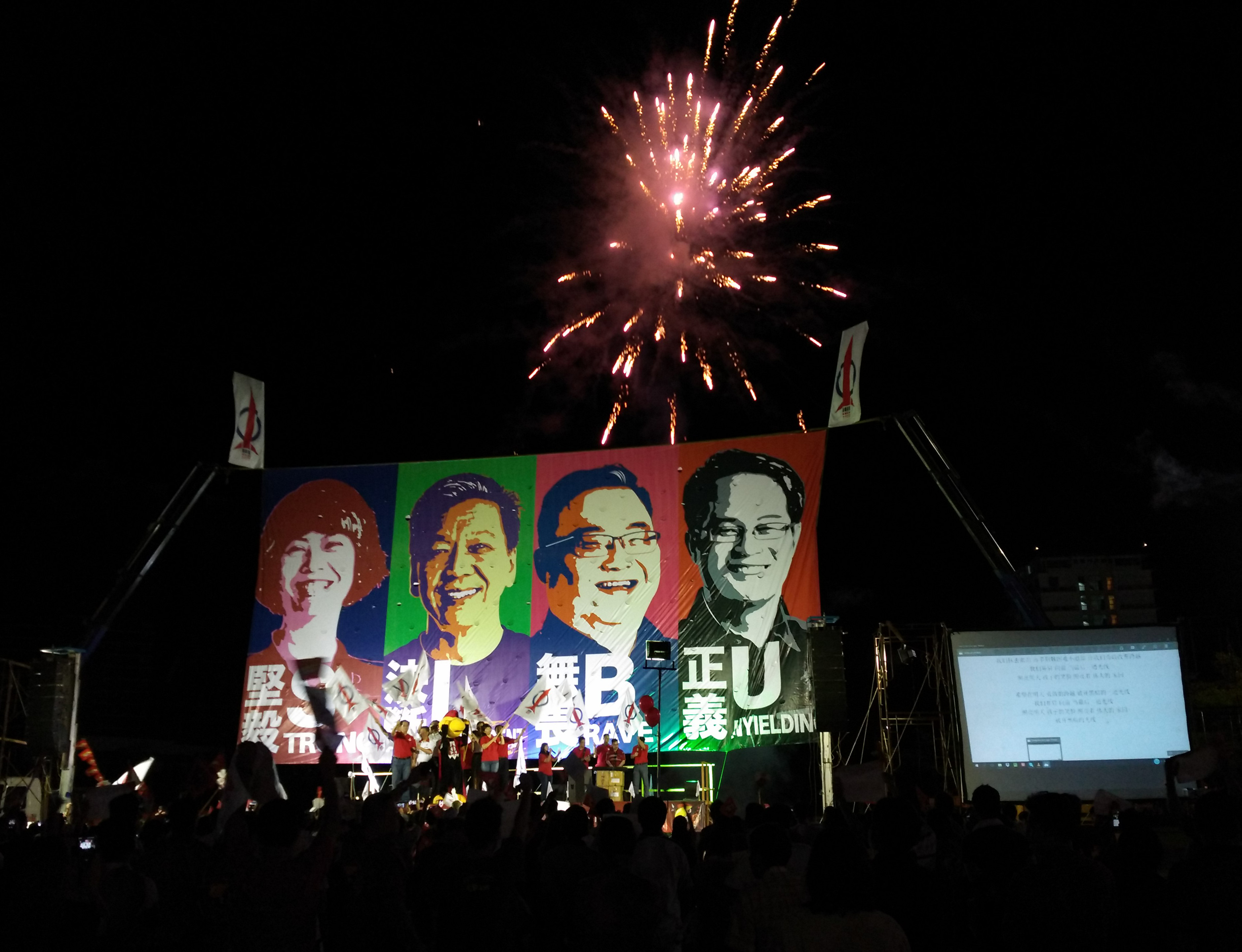
Sarawak DAP Grand Finale campaign in Sibu.

The Sarawak state government was alleged to have abused their power, by banning several opposition MPs and members from entering the state during campaigning, as under Section 67 of the Immigration Act, a person cannot be denied entry into Sarawak if the visit was "for the sole purpose of engaging in legitimate political activity". Opposition leaders like Lim Guan Eng and Azmin Ali were allowed into the state on a temporary basis to campaign during the election period but were told to leave after five days. Both Barisan Nasional and the opposition engaged in online Youtube videos platforms to reach out to voters. Both Barisan Nasional and the opposition conveyed the "state nationalism" message through different ways. Barisan emphasized on voting on local parties to ensure the rights of the Sarawakians are preserved from cultural influence from Peninsular Malaysia while providing a vision of better living in urban centres. Meanwhile, the opposition parties emphasized that all their candidates are sourced locally. The opposition, by showing images or videos regarding the harsh life or rural dwellers in Sarawak, alleged that the federal government has been neglecting the infrastructure development in Sarawak for years.

=== Barisan Nasional ===
Breakaway parties such as TERAS and UPP, with 5 and 4 seats respectively prior to the dissolution of the state assembly, have their members contested seats under the Barisan banner as direct election candidates under a deal by Adenan Satem after their parties were prevented from joining Barisan after opposition from parties such as SUPP and SPDP. Candidates from Barisan have been seen handing out money, foodstuffs and other election goodies to potential voters. The government is also trying to tie the election to the development of the state such as upgrading roads and building the Pan-Borneo Highway.

=== Pakatan Harapan ===
The Impian Sarawak project was started by the DAP national chairman Lim Kit Siang since September 2013 in preparation for 2018 Malaysian general election and 2016 Sarawak state election. Such efforts aimed to improve the image of the opposition, demonstrating that they can also bring development to Sarawak rather than merely paying lip service. Among the projects completed by DAP were: gravity fed water system at Kampung Sait in Padawan, road construction to Kampung Kiding, Padawan, refurbishment of Rumah Gawai at Kampung Serikin, Bau, jetty construction at Rasau river, Sibu, and children education camps.

Due to disagreements in contesting several seats between both DAP and PKR, both parties would be facing each other and Barisan in 6 multi-cornered fights in Batu Kitang, Mulu, Murum, Simanggang, Ngemah and Mambong. A DAP candidate had brought up the issue of minimum wage being lower in Sarawak compared to Peninsula Malaysia and that many younger Sarawakians were migrating to Peninsula Malaysia and Singapore for better job opportunities.

== Electoral candidates ==
Parliamentary constituency		State constituency		Incumbent MLA	Political coalitions				Other parties/ Independent	
Parliamentary constituency		State constituency		Incumbent MLA	Barisan Nasional (BN)		Pakatan Harapan (PH)		Other parties/ Independent	
Parliamentary constituency		State constituency		Incumbent MLA	Candidate name	Party	Candidate name	Party	Candidate name	Party
P192	Mas Gading	N01	Opar	Ranum Mina (UPP)	Ranum Mina	BN Direct	Francis Teron Kadap Noyet	PKR	Patrick Uren	PBDSB
P192	Mas Gading	N01	Opar	Ranum Mina (UPP)	Ranum Mina	BN Direct	Francis Teron Kadap Noyet	PKR	Niponi Undek	IND
P192	Mas Gading	N02	Tasik Biru	Peter Nansian Ngusie (TERAS)	Henry Harry Jinep	SPDP	Mordi Bimol	DAP	None	
P193	Santubong	N03	Tanjong Datu	Adenan Satem (BN)	Adenan Satem	PBB	Jazolkipli Numan	PKR	None	
P193	Santubong	N04	Pantai Damai	Abdul Rahman Junaidi (BN)	Abdul Rahman Junaidi	PBB	None		Zainal Abidin Yet	PAS
P193	Santubong	N05	Demak Laut	Hazland Abang Hipni (BN)	Hazland Abang Hipni	PBB	Mohd Fidzuan Zaidi	AMANAH	None	
P194	Petra Jaya	N06	Tupong	Fazzrudin Abdul Rahman (BN)	Fazzrudin Abdul Rahman	PBB	Nurhanim Mokhsen	PKR	None	
P194	Petra Jaya	N07	Samariang	Sharifah Hasidah Sayeed Aman Ghazali (BN)	Sharifah Hasidah Sayeed Aman Ghazali	PBB	Nani Sahari	AMANAH	Yusof Assidiqqi Ahmad Sharkawi	PAS
P194	Petra Jaya	N08	Satok	Abang Abdul Rahman Zohari Abang Openg (BN)	Abang Abdul Rahman Zohari Abang Openg	PBB	Mohammad Salleh Shawkatali	PKR	None	
P195	Bandar Kuching	N09	Padungan	Wong King Wei (DAP)	Peter Pau	SUPP	Wong King Wei	DAP	Teo Kuang Kim	STAR
P195	Bandar Kuching	N10	Pending	Violet Yong Wui Wui (DAP)	Milton Foo Tiang Wee	SUPP	Violet Yong Wui Wui	DAP	None	
P195	Bandar Kuching	N11	Batu Lintang	See Chee How (PKR)	Sih Hua Tong	SUPP	See Chee How	PKR	Lina Soo	STAR
P196	Stampin	N12	Kota Sentosa	Chong Chieng Jen (DAP)	Wilfred Yap Yau Sin	SUPP	Chong Chieng Jen	DAP	None	
P196	Stampin	N13	Batu Kitang	New Seat	Lo Khere Chiang	SUPP	Abdul Aziz Isa	DAP	Othman Bojeng	IND
P196	Stampin	N13	Batu Kitang	New Seat	Lo Khere Chiang	SUPP	Voon Shiak Ni	PKR	Sulaiman Kadir	IND
P196	Stampin	N14	Batu Kawah	Christina Chiew Wang See (DAP)	Sim Kui Hian	SUPP	Christina Chiew Wang See	DAP	Liu Thian Leong	IND
P197	Kota Samarahan	N15	Asajaya	Abdul Karim Rahman Hamzah (BN)	Abdul Karim Rahman Hamzah	PBB	Abang Junaidi Abang Gom	PKR	None	
P197	Kota Samarahan	N16	Muara Tuang	Mohamad Ali Mahmud (BN)	Idris Buang	PBB	Abang Abdul Halil Abang Naili	AMANAH	Zulkipli Ramzi	PAS
P197	Kota Samarahan	N17	Stakan	New Seat	Mohamad Ali Mahmud	PBB	Leslie Ting Xiang Zhi	DAP	None	
P198	Puncak Borneo	N18	Serembu	New Seat	Miro Simuh	BN Direct	Athina Klaywa Sim	PKR	Buln Patrick Ribos	STAR
P198	Puncak Borneo	N18	Serembu	New Seat	Miro Simuh	BN Direct	Athina Klaywa Sim	PKR	Peter Nyomek Nyeap	IND
P198	Puncak Borneo	N19	Mambong	Jerip Susil (UPP)	Jerip Susil	BN Direct	Sanjan Daik	DAP	None	
P198	Puncak Borneo	N19	Mambong	Jerip Susil (UPP)	Jerip Susil	BN Direct	Willie Mongin	PKR	None	
P198	Puncak Borneo	N20	Tarat	Roland Sagah Wee Inn (BN)	Roland Sagah Wee Inn	PBB	Musa Ngog	PKR	None	
P199	Serian	N21	Tebedu	Michael Manyin Jawong (BN)	Michael Manyin Jawong	PBB	Alex Saben Nipong @ Nyipong	PKR	None	
P199	Serian	N22	Kedup	Maclaine Ben (BN)	Maclaine Ben	PBB	Andrew Nyabe	DAP	Mark Murau Sumon	PBDSB
P199	Serian	N23	Bukit Semuja	New Seat	John Ilus	BN Direct	Edward Andrew Luwak	DAP	Cobbold Lusoi	PBDSB
P199	Serian	N23	Bukit Semuja	New Seat	John Ilus	BN Direct	Edward Andrew Luwak	DAP	Johnny Bob Aput	STAR
P199	Serian	N23	Bukit Semuja	New Seat	John Ilus	BN Direct	Edward Andrew Luwak	DAP	Frederick Bayoi Manggie	IND
P200	Batang Sadong	N24	Sadong Jaya	Aidel Lariwoo (BN)	Aidel Lariwoo	PBB	Othman Mustapha @ Mos	AMANAH	Asan Singkro	PAS
P200	Batang Sadong	N24	Sadong Jaya	Aidel Lariwoo (BN)	Aidel Lariwoo	PBB	Othman Mustapha @ Mos	AMANAH	Awang Rabiee Awang Hosen	IND
P200	Batang Sadong	N25	Simunjan	Mohd Naroden Majais (BN)	Awla Dris	PBB	Jamilah Baharuddin	PKR	Hipni Kanaini	IND
P200	Batang Sadong	N26	Gedong	New Seat	Mohd Naroden Majais	PBB	Rapelson Richard Hamit	AMANAH	Uja Bansi	IND
P201	Batang Lupar	N27	Sebuyau	Julaihi Narawi (BN)	Julaihi Narawi	PBB	Andrew Jain	AMANAH	Wan Abdillah Wan Ahmad	PAS
P201	Batang Lupar	N28	Lingga	Simoi Peri (BN)	Simoi Peri	PBB	Abang Zulkifli Abang Engkeh	PKR	Wan Abdillah Edruce Wan Abdul Rahman	IND
P201	Batang Lupar	N29	Beting Maro	Razaili Gapor (BN)	Razaili Gapor	PBB	Andri Zulkarnaen Hamden	AMANAH	Hamidah Mokhtar	PAS
P202	Sri Aman	N30	Balai Ringin	Snowdan Lawan (BN)	Snowdan Lawan	PRS	Nicholas Mujah Ason	PKR	Pok Ungkut	PBDSB
P202	Sri Aman	N30	Balai Ringin	Snowdan Lawan (BN)	Snowdan Lawan	PRS	Nicholas Mujah Ason	PKR	Entusa Imam	IND
P202	Sri Aman	N31	Bukit Begunan	Mong Dagang (BN)	Mong Dagang	PRS	Jubri Atak	PKR	None	
P202	Sri Aman	N32	Simanggang	Francis Harden Hollis (BN)	Francis Harden Hollis	SUPP	Leon Jimat Donald	DAP	Ngu Piew Seng	IND
P202	Sri Aman	N32	Simanggang	Francis Harden Hollis (BN)	Francis Harden Hollis	SUPP	Norina Umoi Utot	PKR	Ngu Piew Seng	IND
P203	Lubok Antu	N33	Engkilili	Johnical Rayong Ngipa (UPP)	Johnical Rayong Ngipa	BN Direct	Nicholas Bawin Anggat	PKR	Ridi Bauk	IND
P203	Lubok Antu	N33	Engkilili	Johnical Rayong Ngipa (UPP)	Johnical Rayong Ngipa	BN Direct	Nicholas Bawin Anggat	PKR	Adan Sandom	IND
P203	Lubok Antu	N34	Batang Ai	Malcolm Mussen Lamoh (BN)	Malcolm Mussen Lamoh	PRS	Kolien Liong	PKR	None	
P204	Betong	N35	Saribas	Ricky Sitam (BN)	Ricky Sitam	PBB	Yakup Daud	PKR	None	
P204	Betong	N36	Layar	Alfred Jabu Anak Numpang (BN)	Gerald Rentap Jabu	PBB	Vernon Aji Kedit	PKR	None	
P204	Betong	N37	Bukit Saban	Robert Lawson Chuat (BN)	Douglas Uggah Embas	PBB	Noel Changgai Bucking	PKR	None	
P205	Saratok	N38	Kalaka	Abdul Wahab Aziz (BN)	Abdul Wahab Aziz	PBB	Jemat Panjang	PKR	None	
P205	Saratok	N39	Krian	Ali Biju (PKR)	Kilat Beriak	SPDP	Ali Biju	PKR	None	
P205	Saratok	N40	Kabong	New Seat	Mohd Chee Kadir	PBB	Jini Sahini	AMANAH	None	
P206	Tanjong Manis	N41	Kuala Rajang	Len Talif Salleh (BN)	Len Talif Salleh	PBB	Sopian Julaihi	AMANAH	Asbor Abdullah	IND
P206	Tanjong Manis	N42	Semop	Abdullah Saidol (BN)	Abdullah Saidol	PBB	Mohamad Fadillah Sabali	AMANAH	None	
P207	Igan	N43	Daro	Murni Suhaili (BN)	Safiee Ahmad	PBB	Ibrahim Bayau	AMANAH	None	
P207	Igan	N44	Jemoreng	Abu Seman Jahwie (BN)	Juanda Jaya	PBB	Kiprawi Suhaili	AMANAH	Abdullah Saminan	IND
P208	Sarikei	N45	Repok	Wong Hua Seh (DAP)	Huang Tiong Sii	SUPP	Yong Siew Wei	DAP	Wong Chin King	IND
P208	Sarikei	N46	Meradong	Ting Tze Fui (DAP)	Ding Kuong Hiing	SUPP	Ting Tze Fui	DAP	None	
P209	Julau	N47	Pakan	William Mawan Ikom (TERAS)	William Mawan Ikom	BN Direct	Rinda Juliza Alexander	DAP	Tedong Gunda	IND
P209	Julau	N48	Meluan	Wong Judat (SWP)	Rolland Duat Jubin	SPDP	Semana Sawang	PKR	Elly Lawai Ngalai	IND
P209	Julau	N48	Meluan	Wong Judat (SWP)	Rolland Duat Jubin	SPDP	Semana Sawang	PKR	Remiguis Noel @ Jerry Clement	IND
P210	Kanowit	N49	Ngemah	Alexander Vincent (BN)	Alexander Vincent	PRS	Richard Lias	DAP	Joseph Jawa Kendawang	IND
P210	Kanowit	N49	Ngemah	Alexander Vincent (BN)	Alexander Vincent	PRS	Thomas Laja Besi	PKR	Joseph Jawa Kendawang	IND
P210	Kanowit	N50	Machan	Gramong Juna (BN)	Allan Siden Gramong	PBB	George Chen Nguk Fa	PKR	Semawi Paong	IND
P211	Lanang	N51	Bukit Assek	Vacant	Chieng Buong Toon	SUPP	Irene Mary Chang Oi Ling	DAP	Moh Hiong King	STAR
P211	Lanang	N52	Dudong	Yap Hoi Liong (DAP)	Tiong Thai King	BN Direct	Yap Hoi Liong	DAP	Mary Ting Yiik Hong	STAR
P211	Lanang	N52	Dudong	Yap Hoi Liong (DAP)	Tiong Thai King	BN Direct	Yap Hoi Liong	DAP	Casper Kayong Umping	IND
P211	Lanang	N52	Dudong	Yap Hoi Liong (DAP)	Tiong Thai King	BN Direct	Yap Hoi Liong	DAP	Lee Chung Fatt	IND
P212	Sibu	N53	Bawang Assan	Wong Soon Koh (UPP)	Wong Soon Koh	BN Direct	Chiew Sung Ngie	DAP	Wong Sing Wei	STAR
P212	Sibu	N53	Bawang Assan	Wong Soon Koh (UPP)	Wong Soon Koh	BN Direct	Chiew Sung Ngie	DAP	Watson Bangau Johnathan Renang	IND
P212	Sibu	N53	Bawang Assan	Wong Soon Koh (UPP)	Wong Soon Koh	BN Direct	Chiew Sung Ngie	DAP	Yeu Bang Keng	IND
P212	Sibu	N54	Pelawan	David Wong Kee Woan (DAP)	Janet Lau Ung Hie	BN Direct	David Wong Kee Woan	DAP	Priscilla Lau	STAR
P212	Sibu	N55	Nangka	Annuar Rapaee (BN)	Annuar Rapaee	PBB	Abdul Raafidin Majidi	PKR	Tiong Ing Tung	STAR
P213	Mukah	N56	Dalat	Fatimah Abdullah (BN)	Fatimah Abdullah	PBB	Sim Eng Hua	PKR	None	
P213	Mukah	N57	Tellian	New Seat	Yussibnosh Balo	PBB	Asini @ Hasni Yahya	PKR	None	
P213	Mukah	N58	Balingian	Yussibnosh Balo (BN)	Abdul Yakub Arbi	PBB	Nurzaiti Hamdan	AMANAH	None	
P214	Selangau	N59	Tamin	Joseph Mauh Ikeh (BN)	Christopher Gira Sambang	PRS	Simon Joseph	PKR	Ali Puji	IND
P214	Selangau	N60	Kakus	John Sikie Tayai (BN)	John Sikie Tayai	PRS	Joshua Jabeng	PKR	Clement Bayang	PAS
P215	Kapit	N61	Pelagus	George Lagong (TERAS)	Wilson Nyabong Ijang	PRS	Frankie Bendindang Manjah	DAP	Yong Sibat	IND
P215	Kapit	N62	Katibas	Ambrose Blikau Enturan (BN)	Ambrose Blikau Enturan	PBB	Paren Nyawi	DAP	None	
P215	Kapit	N63	Bukit Goram	New Seat	Jefferson Jamit Unyat	PBB	Larry Asap	DAP	None	
P216	Hulu Rajang	N64	Baleh	James Jemut Masing (BN)	James Jemut Masing	PRS	Agop Linsong	DAP	None	
P216	Hulu Rajang	N65	Belaga	Liwan Lagang (BN)	Liwan Lagang	PRS	Alexander Lehan	PKR	None	
P216	Hulu Rajang	N66	Murum	New Seat	Kennedy Chukpai Ugon	PRS	Mathew Silek	DAP	Stanley Ajang Batok	IND
P216	Hulu Rajang	N66	Murum	New Seat	Kennedy Chukpai Ugon	PRS	Abun Sui Anyit	PKR	Stanley Ajang Batok	IND
P217	Bintulu	N67	Jepak	Talib Zulpilip (BN)	Talib Zulpilip	PBB	Abdul Jalil Bujang	PKR	Kiprawi Aman	PAS
P217	Bintulu	N67	Jepak	Talib Zulpilip (BN)	Talib Zulpilip	PBB	Abdul Jalil Bujang	PKR	Mohammed Anuar Abd Hamid	STAR
P217	Bintulu	N67	Jepak	Talib Zulpilip (BN)	Talib Zulpilip	PBB	Abdul Jalil Bujang	PKR	Wong Hau Ming	IND
P217	Bintulu	N68	Tanjong Batu	Chiew Chiu Sing (DAP)	Pau Chiong Ung	SUPP	Chiew Chiu Sing	DAP	Chieng Lea Phing	STAR
P217	Bintulu	N69	Kemena	Stephen Rundi Utom (BN)	Stephen Rundi Utom	PBB	Leighton Manjah	DAP	None	
P217	Bintulu	N70	Samalaju	New Seat	Majang Renggi	PRS	Baba Emperan	DAP	Zharudin Narudin	PAS
P218	Sibuti	N71	Bekenu	Rosey Yunus (TERAS)	Rosey Yunus	BN Direct	Bill Kayong	PKR	Jou @ Peter Jelin	IND
P218	Sibuti	N71	Bekenu	Rosey Yunus (TERAS)	Rosey Yunus	BN Direct	Bill Kayong	PKR	Austin Sigi Melu	IND
P218	Sibuti	N72	Lambir	Ripin Lamat (BN)	Ripin Lamat	PBB	Mohdar Ismail	PKR	Mohammad Arifiriazul Pajio	PAS
P219	Miri	N73	Piasau	Alan Ling Sie Kiong (DAP)	Sebastian Ting Chiew Yew	SUPP	Alan Ling Sie Kiong	DAP	None	
P219	Miri	N74	Pujut	Fong Pau Teck (DAP)	Hii King Chiong	BN Direct	Ting Tiong Choon	DAP	Jofri Jaraiee	PAS
P219	Miri	N74	Pujut	Fong Pau Teck (DAP)	Hii King Chiong	BN Direct	Ting Tiong Choon	DAP	Fong Pau Teck	IND
P219	Miri	N75	Senadin	Lee Kim Shin (BN)	Lee Kim Shin	SUPP	Bob Baru Langub	DAP	Philemon John Edan	PBDSB
P220	Baram	N76	Marudi	Sylvester Entri Muran (TERAS)	Penguang Manggil	SPDP	Elia Bit	PKR	Louis Jalong	IND
P220	Baram	N77	Telang Usan	Dennis Ngau (BN)	Dennis Ngau	PBB	Ronald Engan	PKR	None	
P220	Baram	N78	Mulu	New Seat	Gerawat Gala	BN Direct	Paul Anyie Baja	DAP	Roland Dom Mattu	IND
P220	Baram	N78	Mulu	New Seat	Gerawat Gala	BN Direct	Paul Baya	PKR	Roland Dom Mattu	IND
P221	Limbang	N79	Bukit Kota	Abdul Rahman Ismail (BN)	Abdul Rahman Ismail	PBB	None		None	
P221	Limbang	N80	Batu Danau	Paulus Palu Gumbang (TERAS)	Paulus Palu Gumbang	BN Direct	None		Ali Adap	IND
P222	Lawas	N81	Ba'kelalan	Baru Bian (PKR)	Willie Liau	SPDP	Baru Bian	PKR	None	
P222	Lawas	N82	Bukit Sari	Awang Tengah Ali Hasan (BN)	Awang Tengah Ali Hasan	PBB	None		None	

== Results ==

Two seats were won by Barisan Nasional uncontested, which are Bukit Kota and Bukit Sari. Despite the initiaves under the Impian Sarawak project, DAP struggled to make significant inroads with rural voters. Nevertheless, DAP National Publicity Secretary Tony Pua continued the project post-election, recognizing that shifting political mindsets takes time.

Party or alliance		Votes	%	Seats	+/–
Barisan Nasional	Parti Pesaka Bumiputera Bersatu	235,487	30.84	40	+4
Barisan Nasional	Sarawak United Peoples' Party	88,205	11.55	7	+1
Barisan Nasional	Parti Rakyat Sarawak	53,004	6.94	11	+3
Barisan Nasional	Sarawak Progressive Democratic Party	21,846	2.86	3	–2
Barisan Nasional	Independents	76,411	10.01	11	New
Barisan Nasional	Total	474,953	62.19	72	+17
Pakatan Harapan	Democratic Action Party	145,873	19.10	7	–5
Pakatan Harapan	People's Justice Party	76,003	9.95	3	0
Pakatan Harapan	National Trust Party	8,433	1.10	0	New
Pakatan Harapan	Total	230,309	30.16	10	New
Pan-Malaysian Islamic Party		13,210	1.73	0	0
State Reform Party		2,841	0.37	0	0
Parti Bansa Dayak Sarawak Baru		1,244	0.16	0	New
Independents		41,135	5.39	0	–1
Total		763,692	100.00	82	+11
Valid votes		763,692	98.67		
Invalid/blank votes		10,270	1.33		
Total votes		773,962	100.00		
Registered voters/turnout		1,109,795	69.74		
Source: SPR

Constituency results of the 2016 election to the Sarawak State Legislative Assembly
#	Constituency	Winner	Party	Votes	Opponent(s)	Party	Votes	Plurality	Incumbent
N1	Opar	Ranum Mina	BN	3,665	Francis Teron Kadap Noyet	PH-PKR	1,549	2,082	Ranum Mina (UPP)
N1	Opar	Ranum Mina	BN	3,665	Patrick Uren	PBDSB	524	2,082	Ranum Mina (UPP)
N1	Opar	Ranum Mina	BN	3,665	Niponi Undek	IND	1,583	2,082	Ranum Mina (UPP)
N2	Tasik Biru	Henry Jinep	BN-SPDP	6,922	Mordi Bimol	PH-DAP	5,634	1,288	Peter Nansian Ngusie (TERAS)
N3	Tanjung Datu	Adenan Satem	BN-PBB	6,630	Jazolkipli Numan	PH-PKR	468	5,892	Amar Haji Adenan Haji Satem (BN-PBB)
N4	Pantai Damai	Abdul Rahman Junaidi	BN-PBB	10,918	Zainal Abidin Yet	PAS	1,658	9,260	Abdul Rahman Junaidi (BN-PBB)
N5	Demak Laut	Hazland Abang Hipni	BN-PBB	8,539	Mohd Fidzuan Zaidi	PH-PAN	1,157	7,382	Hazland Abang Hipni (BN-PBB)
N6	Tupong	Fazzrudin Abdul Rahman	BN-PBB	10,942	Nurhanim Mokhsen	PH-PKR	2,887	8,055	Ir. Haji Daud Abdul Rahman (BN-PBB)
N7	Samariang	Sharifah Hasidah Sayeed Aman Ghazali	BN-PBB	9,795	Yusof Assidiqqi Ahmad Sharkawi	PAS	2,035	7,760	Sharifah Hasidah Sayeed Aman Ghazali (BN-PBB)
N7	Samariang	Sharifah Hasidah Sayeed Aman Ghazali	BN-PBB	9,795	Nani Sahari	PH-PAN	389	7,760	Sharifah Hasidah Sayeed Aman Ghazali (BN-PBB)
N8	Satok	Amar Abang Abdul Rahman Zohari Tun Abang Haji Openg	BN-PBB	6,854	Mohammad Salleh Shawkatali	PH-PKR	1,809	5,045	Amar Abang Abdul Rahman Zohari Tun Abang Haji Openg (BN-PBB)
N9	Padungan	Wong King Wei	PH-DAP	9,332	Peter Pau	BN-SUPP	5,062	4,270	Wong King Wei (PH-DAP)
N9	Padungan	Wong King Wei	PH-DAP	9,332	Teo Kuang Kim	STAR	116	4,270	Wong King Wei (PH-DAP)
N10	Pending	Violet Yong Wui Wui	PH-DAP	12,454	Milton Foo Tiang Wee	BN-SUPP	7,442	5,012	Violet Yong Wui Wui (PH-DAP)
N11	Batu Lintang	See Chee How	PH-PKR	10,758	Sih Hua Tong	BN-SUPP	6,373	4,385	See Chee How (PH-PKR)
N11	Batu Lintang	See Chee How	PH-PKR	10,758	Lina Soo	STAR	331	4,385	See Chee How (PH-PKR)
N12	Kota Sentosa	Chong Chieng Jen	PH-DAP	10,047	Wilfred Yap Yau Sin	BN-SUPP	7,228	2,819	Chong Chieng Jen (PH-DAP)
N13	Batu Kitang	Lo Khere Chiang	BN-SUPP	6,466	Voon Shiak Ni	PH-PKR	883	1,842	New Seat
N13	Batu Kitang	Lo Khere Chiang	BN-SUPP	6,466	Abdul Aziz Isa	PH-DAP	4,624	1,842	New Seat
N13	Batu Kitang	Lo Khere Chiang	BN-SUPP	6,466	Othman Bojeng	IND	54	1,842	New Seat
N13	Batu Kitang	Lo Khere Chiang	BN-SUPP	6,466	Sulaiman Kadir	IND	61	1,842	New Seat
N14	Batu Kawa	Sim Kui Hian	BN-SUPP	6,414	Christina Chiew Wang See	PH-DAP	4,329	2,085	Christina Chiew Wang See (PH-DAP)
N14	Batu Kawa	Sim Kui Hian	BN-SUPP	6,414	Liu Thian Leong	IND	1,109	2,085	Christina Chiew Wang See (PH-DAP)
N15	Asajaya	Abdul Karim Rahman Hamzah	BN-PBB	6,163	Abang Junaidi Abang Gom	PH-PKR	2,085	4,078	Abdul Karim Rahman Hamzah (BN-PBB)
N16	Muara Tuang	Idris Buang	BN-PBB	9,503	Zulkipli Ramzi	PAS	1,542	7,961	Mohamad Ali Mahmud (BN-PBB)
N16	Muara Tuang	Idris Buang	BN-PBB	9,503	Abang Abdul Halil Abang Naili	PH-PAN	753	7,961	Mohamad Ali Mahmud (BN-PBB)
N17	Stakan	Mohamad Ali Mahmud	BN-PBB	8,820	Leslie Ting Xiang Zhi	PH-DAP	1,778	7,042	New Seat
N18	Serembu	Miro Simuh	BN	3,452	Athina Klaywa Sim	PH-PKR	1,218	1,397	New Seat
N18	Serembu	Miro Simuh	BN	3,452	Buln Patrick Ribos	STAR	120	1,397	New Seat
N18	Serembu	Miro Simuh	BN	3,452	Peter Nyomek Nyeap	IND	2,055	1,397	New Seat
N19	Mambong (previously known as Bengoh)	Jerip Susil	BN	6,161	Willie Mongin	PH-PKR	2,645	3,333	Jerip Susil (UPP)
N19	Mambong (previously known as Bengoh)	Jerip Susil	BN	6,161	Sanjan Daik	PH-DAP	2,828	3,333	Jerip Susil (UPP)
N20	Tarat	Roland Sagah Wee Inn	BN-PBB	8,450	Musa Ngog	PH-PKR	3,029	5,421	Roland Sagah Wee Inn (BN-PBB)
N21	Tebedu	Michael Manyin Jawong	BN-PBB	7,357	Alex Saben Nipong @ Nyipong	PH-PKR	1,164	6,193	Michael Manyin Jawong (BN-PBB)
N22	Kedup	Maclaine Ben @ Martin Ben	BN-PBB	5,769	Andrew Nyabe	PH-DAP	1,941	3,828	Maclaine Ben @ Martin Ben (BN-PBB)
N22	Kedup	Maclaine Ben @ Martin Ben	BN-PBB	5,769	Mark Murau Sumon	PBDSB	168	3,828	Maclaine Ben @ Martin Ben (BN-PBB)
N23	Bukit Semuja	John Ilus	BN	5,451	Edward Andrew Luwak	PH-DAP	2,307	3,144	New Seat
N23	Bukit Semuja	John Ilus	BN	5,451	Frederick Bayoi Manggie	IND	1,196	3,144	New Seat
N23	Bukit Semuja	John Ilus	BN	5,451	Johnny Aput	STAR	53	3,144	New Seat
N23	Bukit Semuja	John Ilus	BN	5,451	Cobbold Lusoi	PBDSB	133	3,144	New Seat
N24	Sadong Jaya	Aidel Lariwoo	BN-PBB	3,925	Asan Singkro	PAS	458	3,467	Aidel Lariwoo (BN-PBB)
N24	Sadong Jaya	Aidel Lariwoo	BN-PBB	3,925	Othman Mustapha @ Mos	PH-PAN	157	3,467	Aidel Lariwoo (BN-PBB)
N24	Sadong Jaya	Aidel Lariwoo	BN-PBB	3,925	Awang Rabiee Awang Hosen	IND	234	3,467	Aidel Lariwoo (BN-PBB)
N25	Simunjan	Awla Idris	BN-PBB	4,101	Jamilah Baharuddin	PH-PKR	1,389	2,712	Haji Naroden Majais (BN-PBB)
N25	Simunjan	Awla Idris	BN-PBB	4,101	Hipni Kanaini	IND	275	2,712	Haji Naroden Majais (BN-PBB)
N26	Gedong	Mohd Naroden Majais	BN-PBB	4,064	Rapelson Richard Hamit	PH-PAN	699	3,365	New Seat
N26	Gedong	Mohd Naroden Majais	BN-PBB	4,064	Uja Bansi	IND	396	3,365	New Seat
N27	Sebuyau	Julaihi Narawi	BN-PBB	4,531	Wan Abdillah Wan Ahmad	PAS	1,789	2,742	Julaihi Narawi (BN-PBB)
N27	Sebuyau	Julaihi Narawi	BN-PBB	4,531	Andrew Jain	PH-PAN	164	2,742	Julaihi Narawi (BN-PBB)
N28	Lingga	Hajjah Simoi Peri	BN-PBB	4,169	Abang Zulkifli Abang Engkeh	PH-PKR	1,226	2,943	Hajjah Simoi Peri (BN-PBB)
N28	Lingga	Hajjah Simoi Peri	BN-PBB	4,169	Wan Abdillah Edruce Wan Abdul Rahman	IND	842	2,943	Hajjah Simoi Peri (BN-PBB)
N29	Beting Maro	Razaili Gapor	BN-PBB	4,758	Hamidah Mokhtar	PAS	3,051	1,707	Razaili Gapor (BN-PBB)
N29	Beting Maro	Razaili Gapor	BN-PBB	4,758	Andri Zulkarnaen Hamden	PH-PAN	103	1,707	Razaili Gapor (BN-PBB)
N30	Balai Ringin	Snowdan Lawan	BN-PRS	4,478	Nicholas Mujah Ason	PH-PKR	700	2,039	Snowdan Lawan (BN-PRS)
N30	Balai Ringin	Snowdan Lawan	BN-PRS	4,478	Pok Ungkut	PBDSB	90	2,039	Snowdan Lawan (BN-PRS)
N30	Balai Ringin	Snowdan Lawan	BN-PRS	4,478	Entusa Imam	IND	2,439	2,039	Snowdan Lawan (BN-PRS)
N31	Bukit Begunan	Mong Dagang	BN-PRS	5,550	Jubri Atak	PH-PKR	855	4,695	Mong Dagang (BN-PRS)
N32	Simanggang	Francis Harden Hollis	BN-SUPP	4,096	Norina Umoi Utot	PH-PKR	580	1,390	Francis Harden Hollis (BN-SUPP)
N32	Simanggang	Francis Harden Hollis	BN-SUPP	4,096	Leon Jimat Donald	PH-DAP	695	1,390	Francis Harden Hollis (BN-SUPP)
N32	Simanggang	Francis Harden Hollis	BN-SUPP	4,096	Ngu Piew Seng	IND	2,706	1,390	Francis Harden Hollis (BN-SUPP)
N33	Engkilili	Johnical Rayong Ngipa	BN	5,513	Nicholas Bawin Anggat	PH-PKR	532	3,857	Johnical Rayong Ngipa (UPP)
N33	Engkilili	Johnical Rayong Ngipa	BN	5,513	Ridi Bauk	IND	1,656	3,857	Johnical Rayong Ngipa (UPP)
N33	Engkilili	Johnical Rayong Ngipa	BN	5,513	Adan Sandom	IND	91	3,857	Johnical Rayong Ngipa (UPP)
N34	Batang Ai (previously known as Batang Air)	Malcom Mussen Lamoh	BN-PRS	4,884	Kolien Liong	PH-PKR	1,698	3,186	Malcom Mussen Lamoh (BN-PRS)
N35	Saribas	Ricky@Mohamad Razi Sitam	BN-PBB	5,963	Yakup Daud	PH-PKR	1,531	4,432	Ricky@Mohamad Razi Sitam (BN-PBB)
N36	Layar	Gerald Rentap Jabu	BN-PBB	3,931	Vernon Aji Kedit	PH-PKR	2,503	1,428	Alfred Jabu Anak Numpang (BN-PBB)
N37	Bukit Saban	Douglas Uggah Embas	BN-PBB	5,524	Noel Changgai Bucking	PH-PKR	925	4,599	Robert Lawson Chuat (BN-PBB)
N38	Kalaka	Abdul Wahab Aziz	BN-PBB	3,988	Jemat Panjang	PH-PKR	1,153	2,835	Abdul Wahab Aziz (BN-PBB)
N39	Krian	Ali Biju	PH-PKR	5,388	Kilat Beriak	BN-SPDP	3,748	1,640	Ali Anak Biju (PH-PKR)
N40	Kabong	Mohd Chee Kadir	BN-PBB	5,069	Jini Sahini	PH-PAN	1,484	3,585	New Seat
N41	Kuala Rajang (previously known as Belawai)	Len Talif Salleh	BN-PBB	6,235	Sopian Julaihi	PH-PAN	649	5,586	Len Talif Salleh (BN-PBB)
N41	Kuala Rajang (previously known as Belawai)	Len Talif Salleh	BN-PBB	6,235	Asbor Abdullah	IND	153	5,586	Len Talif Salleh (BN-PBB)
N42	Semop	Abdullah Saidol	BN-PBB	5,290	Mohamad Fadillah Sabali	PH-PAN	878	4,412	Abdullah Saidol (BN-PBB)
N43	Daro	Safiee Ahmad	BN-PBB	5,001	Ibrahim Bayau	PH-PAN	569	4,432	Murni Suhaili (BN-PBB)
N44	Jemoreng	Juanda Jaya	BN-PBB	5,084	Kiprawi Suhaili	PH-PAN	187	3,789	Abu Seman Jahwie (BN-PBB)
N44	Jemoreng	Juanda Jaya	BN-PBB	5,084	Abdullah Saminan	IND	1,295	3,789	Abu Seman Jahwie (BN-PBB)
N45	Repok	Huang Tiong Sii	BN-SUPP	7,446	Yong Siew Wei	PH-DAP	6,503	943	Wong Hua Seh (PH-DAP)
N45	Repok	Huang Tiong Sii	BN-SUPP	7,446	Wong Ching King	IND	381	943	Wong Hua Seh (PH-DAP)
N46	Meradong	Ding Kuong Hiing	BN-SUPP	6,865	Ting Tze Fui	PH-DAP	5,349	1,516	Ting Tze Fui (PH-DAP)
N47	Pakan	William Mawan Ikom	BN	3,999	Rinda Juliza Alexander	PH-DAP	285	426	William Mawan Ikom (TERAS)
N47	Pakan	William Mawan Ikom	BN	3,999	Jawie Jingot @ Jenggot	IND	3,573	426	William Mawan Ikom (TERAS)
N48	Meluan	Rolland Duat Jubin	BN-SPDP	3,363	Semana Sawang	PH-PKR	2,008	677	Wong Judat (SWP)
N48	Meluan	Rolland Duat Jubin	BN-SPDP	3,363	Remiguis Noel @ Jerry Clement	IND	934	677	Wong Judat (SWP)
N48	Meluan	Rolland Duat Jubin	BN-SPDP	3,363	Elly Lawai Ngalai	IND	2,686	677	Wong Judat (SWP)
N49	Ngemah	Alexander Vincent	BN-PRS	2,888	Thomas Laja Besi	PH-PKR	396	154	Alexander Vincent (BN-PRS)
N49	Ngemah	Alexander Vincent	BN-PRS	2,888	Richard Lias	PH-DAP	243	154	Alexander Vincent (BN-PRS)
N49	Ngemah	Alexander Vincent	BN-PRS	2,888	Joseph Jawa Kendawang	IND	2,734	154	Alexander Vincent (BN-PRS)
N50	Machan	Allan Siden Gramong	BN-PBB	4,550	George Chen Nguk Fa	PH-PKR	1,381	2,952	Gramong Juna (BN-PBB)
N50	Machan	Allan Siden Gramong	BN-PBB	4,550	Semawi Paong	IND	1,598	2,952	Gramong Juna (BN-PBB)
N51	Bukit Assek	Irene Mary Chang Oi Ling	PH-DAP	11,392	Chieng Buong Toon	BN-SUPP	6,895	4,497	Vacant
N51	Bukit Assek	Irene Mary Chang Oi Ling	PH-DAP	11,392	Moh Hiong King	STAR	374	4,497	Vacant
N52	Dudong	Tiong Thai King	BN	9,700	Yap Hoi Liong	PH-DAP	7,554	2,146	Yap Hoi Liong (PH-DAP)
N52	Dudong	Tiong Thai King	BN	9,700	Mary Ting Yiik Hong	STAR	152	2,146	Yap Hoi Liong (PH-DAP)
N52	Dudong	Tiong Thai King	BN	9,700	Casper Kayong Umping	IND	228	2,146	Yap Hoi Liong (PH-DAP)
N52	Dudong	Tiong Thai King	BN	9,700	Lee Chung Fatt	IND	3,288	2,146	Yap Hoi Liong (PH-DAP)
N53	Bawang Assan	Wong Soon Koh	BN	9,015	Chiew Sung Ngie	PH-DAP	4,884	4,131	Wong Soon Koh (UPP)
N53	Bawang Assan	Wong Soon Koh	BN	9,015	Wong Sing Wei	STAR	100	4,131	Wong Soon Koh (UPP)
N53	Bawang Assan	Wong Soon Koh	BN	9,015	Watson Bangau Johnathan Renang	IND	569	4,131	Wong Soon Koh (UPP)
N53	Bawang Assan	Wong Soon Koh	BN	9,015	Yeu Bang Keng	IND	63	4,131	Wong Soon Koh (UPP)
N54	Pelawan	David Wong Kee Woan	PH-DAP	13,056	Janet Lau Ung Hie	BN	8,742	4,314	David Wong Kee Woan (PH-DAP)
N54	Pelawan	David Wong Kee Woan	PH-DAP	13,056	Priscilla Lau	STAR	597	4,314	David Wong Kee Woan (PH-DAP)
N55	Nangka	Annuar Rapaee	BN-PBB	9,617	Abdul Raafidin Majidi	PH-PKR	2,000	7,617	Annuar Rapaee (BN-PBB)
N55	Nangka	Annuar Rapaee	BN-PBB	9,617	Tiong Ing Tung	STAR	773	7,617	Annuar Rapaee (BN-PBB)
N56	Dalat	Hajjah Fatimah Abdullah	BN-PBB	7,107	Sim Eng Hua	PH-PKR	777	6,330	Hajjah Fatimah Abdullah (BN-PBB)
N57	Tellian	Yussibnosh Balo	BN-PBB	5,087	Asini @ Hasni Yahya	PH-PKR	666	4,421	New Seat
N58	Balingian	Abdul Yakub Arbi	BN-PBB	4,208	Nurzaiti Hamdan	PH-PAN	1,244	2,964	Abdul Taib Mahmud (BN-PBB)
N59	Tamin	Christopher Gira Sambang	BN-PRS	6,230	Simon Joseph	PH-PKR	954	2,085	Joseph Mauh Ikeh (BN-PRS)
N59	Tamin	Christopher Gira Sambang	BN-PRS	6,230	Ali Puji	IND	4,145	2,085	Joseph Mauh Ikeh (BN-PRS)
N60	Kakus	John Sikie Tayai	BN-PRS	7,054	Joshua Jabing @ Jabeng	PH-PKR	1,843	5,211	John Sikie Tayai (BN-PRS)
N60	Kakus	John Sikie Tayai	BN-PRS	7,054	Clement Bayang	PAS	482	5,211	John Sikie Tayai (BN-PRS)
N61	Pelagus	Wilson Nyabong Ijang	BN-PRS	3,778	Frankie Bendindang Manjah	PH-DAP	494	3,284	George Lagong (TERAS)
N61	Pelagus	Wilson Nyabong Ijang	BN-PRS	3,778	Yong Sibat	IND	321	3,284	George Lagong (TERAS)
N62	Katibas	Ambrose Blikau Enturan	BN-PBB	4,681	Paren Nyawi	PH-DAP	1,628	3,053	Ambrose Blikau Enturan (BN-PBB)
N63	Bukit Goram	Jefferson Jamit Unyat	BN-PBB	4,596	Larry Asap	PH-DAP	2,010	2,586	New Seat
N64	Baleh	James Jemut Masing	BN-PRS	5,272	Agop Linsong	PH-DAP	479	4,793	James Jemut Masing (BN-PRS)
N65	Belaga	Liwan Lagang	BN-PRS	4,149	Alexander Lehan	PH-PKR	463	3,686	Liwan Lagang (BN-PRS)
N66	Murum	Chukpai Ugon	BN-PRS	3,265	Abun Sui Anyit	PH-PKR	1,065	2,200	New Seat
N66	Murum	Chukpai Ugon	BN-PRS	3,265	Mathew Silek	PH-DAP	687	2,200	New Seat
N66	Murum	Chukpai Ugon	BN-PRS	3,265	Stanley Ajang Batok	IND	1,029	2,200	New Seat
N67	Jepak	Talip Zulpilip	BN-PBB	6,342	Abdul Jalil Bujang	PH-PKR	2,141	4,201	Talip Zulpilip (BN-PBB)
N67	Jepak	Talip Zulpilip	BN-PBB	6,342	Kiprawi Aman	PAS	406	4,201	Talip Zulpilip (BN-PBB)
N67	Jepak	Talip Zulpilip	BN-PBB	6,342	Mohammed Anuar Abd Hamid	STAR	136	4,201	Talip Zulpilip (BN-PBB)
N67	Jepak	Talip Zulpilip	BN-PBB	6,342	Wong Hau Ming	IND	190	4,201	Talip Zulpilip (BN-PBB)
N68	Tanjung Batu (previously known as Kidurong)	Chiew Chiu Sing	PH-DAP	7,984	Pau Chiong Ung	BN-SUPP	5,436	2,548	Chiew Chiu Sing (PH-DAP)
N68	Tanjung Batu (previously known as Kidurong)	Chiew Chiu Sing	PH-DAP	7,984	Chieng Lea Phing	STAR	89	2,548	Chiew Chiu Sing (PH-DAP)
N69	Kemena	Stephen Rundi Utom	BN-PBB	7,192	Leighton Manjah	PH-DAP	2,324	4,868	Stephen Rundi Utom (BN-PBB)
N70	Samalaju	Majang Renggi	BN-PRS	5,456	Zharudin Narudin	PAS	447	2,464	New Seat
N70	Samalaju	Majang Renggi	BN-PRS	5,456	Baba Emperan	PH-DAP	2,992	2,464	New Seat
N71	Bekenu	Rosey Yunus	BN	6,009	Bill Kayong	PH-PKR	1,220	4,789	Rosey Yunus (TERAS)
N71	Bekenu	Rosey Yunus	BN	6,009	Jou @ Peter Jelin	IND	565	4,789	Rosey Yunus (TERAS)
N71	Bekenu	Rosey Yunus	BN	6,009	Austin Sigi Melu	IND	589	4,789	Rosey Yunus (TERAS)
N72	Lambir	Ripin Lamat	BN-PBB	7,503	Mohdar Ismail	PH-PKR	2,596	4,907	Ripin Lamat (BN-PBB)
N72	Lambir	Ripin Lamat	BN-PBB	7,503	Mohammad Arifiriazul Paijo	PAS	829	4,907	Ripin Lamat (BN-PBB)
N73	Piasau	Sebastian Ting Chiew Yew	BN-SUPP	7,799	Alan Ling Sie Kiong	PH-DAP	5,687	2,112	Alan Ling Sie Kiong (PH-DAP)
N74	Pujut	Ting Tiong Choon	PH-DAP	8,899	Hii King Chiong	BN	7,140	1,759	Fong Pau Teck (PH-DAP)
N74	Pujut	Ting Tiong Choon	PH-DAP	8,899	Jofri Jaraiee	PAS	513	1,759	Fong Pau Teck (PH-DAP)
N74	Pujut	Ting Tiong Choon	PH-DAP	8,899	Fong Pau Teck	IND	375	1,759	Fong Pau Teck (PH-DAP)
N75	Senadin	Lee Kim Shin	BN-SUPP	10,683	Bob Baru Langub	PH-DAP	7,145	3,538	Lee Kim Shin (BN-SUPP)
N75	Senadin	Lee Kim Shin	BN-SUPP	10,683	Philemon John Edan	PBDSB	329	3,538	Lee Kim Shin (BN-SUPP)
N76	Marudi	Penguang Manggil	BN-SPDP	5,493	Elia Bit	PH-PKR	4,106	1,387	Sylvester Entri Muran (TERAS)
N76	Marudi	Penguang Manggil	BN-SPDP	5,493	Louis Jalong	IND	56	1,387	Sylvester Entri Muran (TERAS)
N77	Telang Usan	Dennis Ngau	BN-PBB	3,231	Roland Engan	PH-PKR	3,064	167	Dennis Ngau (BN-PBB)
N78	Mulu	Gerawat Gala	BN	3,198	Paul Baya	PH-PKR	1,490	1,708	New Seat
N78	Mulu	Gerawat Gala	BN	3,198	Paul Anyie Raja	PH-DAP	309	1,708	New Seat
N78	Mulu	Gerawat Gala	BN	3,198	Roland Dom Mattu	IND	239	1,708	New Seat
N79	Bukit Kota	Abdul Rahman Ismail	BN-PBB	–	Uncontested	–	–	–	Abdul Rahman Ismail (BN-PBB)
N80	Batu Danau	Paulus Gumbang	BN	4,366	Ali Adap	IND	1,427	2,939	Paulus Gumbang (TERAS)
N81	Ba'Kelalan	Baru Bian	PH-PKR	2,858	Willie Liau	BN-SPDP	2,320	538	Baru Bian (PH-PKR)
N82	Bukit Sari	Amar Hj. Awang Tengah Ali Hassan	BN-PBB	–	Uncontested	–	–	–	Amar Hj. Awang Tengah Ali Hassan (BN-PBB)

=== Seats changing party ===
No.	Seat	Before		After	
No.	Seat	Party	Member	Party	Member
N14	Batu Kawah	PH–DAP	Christina Chiew Wang See	BN–SUPP	Sim Kui Hian
N45	Repok	PH–DAP	Wong Hua Seh	BN–SUPP	Huang Tiong Sii
N46	Meradong	PH–DAP	Ting Tze Fui	BN–SUPP	Ding Kuong Hiing
N52	Dudong	PH–DAP	Yap Hoi Liong	BN (no party)	Tiong Thai King
N61	Pelagus	Independent	George Lagong	BN–PRS	Wilson Nyabong Ijang
N73	Piasau	PH–DAP	Alan Ling Sie Kiong	BN–SUPP	Sebastian Ting Chiew Yew

== Election pendulums ==
Pre-election pendulum

GOVERNMENT SEATS
Marginal
Ngemah	Alexander Vincent	PRS	44.3
Telang Usan	Dennis Ngau	PBB	46.2
Senadin	Lee Kim Sin	SUPP	49.5
Kakus	John Sikie Tayai	PRS	51.2
Beting Maro	Razali Gapor	PBB	52.8
Kedup	Maclaine Ben @ Martin Ben	PBB	53.4
Machan	Gramong Juna	PBB	53.4
Lambir	Ripin Lamat	PBB	52.9
Mambong (previously Bengoh)	Jerip Susil	SUPP	54.6
Tasik Biru	Peter Nansian Ngusie	SPDP	55.2
Tarat	Roland Sagah Wee Inn	PBB	55.2
Fairly safe
Tamin	Joseph Mauh Ikeh	PRS	56.2
Opar	Ranum Mina	SUPP	56.5
Bawang Assan	Wong Soon Koh	SUPP	56.6
Meluan	Wong Judat	SPDP	57.4
Pakan	William Mawan Ikom	SPDP	58.0
Safe
Jepak	Talib Zulpilip	PBB	60.8
Katibas	Ambrose Blikau Enturan	PBB	61.6
Layar	Alfred Jabu Numpang	PBB	62.0
Balai Ringin	Snowdan Lawan	PRS	63.3
Saribas	Ricky@Mohamad Razi Bin Sitam	PBB	63.3
Kemena	Stephen Rundi Utom	PBB	63.4
Simanggang	Francis Harden Hollis	SUPP	66.4
Bukit Begunan	Mong Dagang	PRS	67.1
Tebedu	Michael Manyin Jawong	PBB	67.2
Belaga	Liwan Lagang	PRS	67.2
Kalaka	Abdul Wahab Aziz	PBB	67.3
Sebuyau	Julaihi Narawi	PBB	67.7
Bukit Saban	Robert Lawson Chuat	PBB	67.7
Tupong	Daud Abdul Rahman	PBB	68.1
Bekenu	Rosey Yunus	SPDP	69.3
Lingga	Simoi Peri	PBB	69.7
Satok	Abang Abdul Rahman Zohari Abang Openg	PBB	69.8
Asajaya	Abdul Karim Rahman Hamzah	PBB	69.8
Batu Danau	Palu @ Paulus Gumbang	SPDP	70.2
Batang Ai	Malcom Mussen Lamoh	PRS	71.0
Marudi	Sylvester Entri Muran	SPDP	71.1
Engkilili	Johnical Rayong Ngipa	SUPP	71.2
Jemoreng	Gani @ Abu Seman Jahwie	PBB	71.6
Sadong Jaya	Aidel Lariwoo	PBB	71.7
Bukit Kota	Abdul Rahman Ismail	PBB	72.2
Daro	Murni Suhaili	PBB	73.4
Pantai Damai	Abdul Rahman Junaidi	PBB	74.0
Simunjan	Naroden Majais	PBB	74.2
Samariang	Sharifah Hasidah Sayeed Aman Ghazali	PBB	74.4
Demak Laut	Hazland Abang Hipni	PBB	74.6
Balingian	Abdul Taib Mahmud	PBB	75.0
Nangka	Annuar Rapa'ee	PBB	75.1
Muara Tuang	Mohamad Ali Mahmud	PBB	75.8
Tanjung Datu	Adenan Satem	PBB	76.5
Dalat	Fatimah Abdullah @ Ting Sai Ming	PBB	77.9
Semop	Abdullah Saidol	PBB	81.4
Baleh	James Jemut Masing	PRS	81.6
Bukit Sari	Awang Tengah Ali Hassan	PBB	85.2
Kuala Rajang (previously Belawai)	Banyi Beriak	PBB	85.4

NON-GOVERNMENT SEATS
Marginal
Dudong	Yap Hoi Liong	DAP	49.6
Batu Kawa	Christina Chiew Wang See	DAP	50.9
Piasau	Ling Sie Kiong	DAP	53.4
Ba'kelalan	Baru Bian	PKR	54.6
Fairly safe
Pelagus	George Lagong	IND	57.3
Repok	Wong Hua Seh	DAP	59.0
Krian	Ali Biju	PKR	59.6
Safe
Kota Sentosa	Chong Chieng Jen	DAP	61.2
Meradong	Ting Tze Fui	DAP	61.4
Pujut	Fong Pau Teck	DAP	62.9
Pelawan	Wong Kee Woan	DAP	65.4
Pending	Violet Yong Wui Wui	DAP	67.5
Tanjung Batu (previously Kidurong)	Chiew Chu Sing	DAP	68.2
Batu Lintang	See Chee How	PKR	71.6
Padungan	Wong King Wei	DAP	72.2
Bukit Assek	Wong Ho Leng	DAP	73.0

Post-election pendulum

GOVERNMENT SEATS
Marginal
Meluan	Rolland Duat Jubin	PDP	37.40
Ngemah	Alexander Vincent	PRS	46.13
Dudong	Tiong Thai King	UPP	46.36
Opar	Ranum Mina	UPP	50.06
Serembu	Miro Simuh	PBB	50.43
Simanggang	Francis Harden Hollis	SUPP	50.70
Pakan	William Mawan Ikom	PBB	50.90
Telang Usan	Dennis Ngau	PBB	51.33
Repok	Huang Tiong Sii	SUPP	51.96
Mambong	Jerip Susil	UPP	52.96
Batu Kitang	Ir. Lo Khere Chiang	SUPP	53.48
Murum	Chukpai Ugon	PRS	54.00
Batu Kawah	Prof. Dr. Sim Kui Hian	SUPP	54.12
Tamin	Christopher Gira Sambang	PRS	54.99
Tasik Biru	Harry @ Henry Jinep	PDP	55.13
Fairly safe
Meradong	Ding Kuong Hiing	SUPP	56.21
Marudi	Penguang Manggil	PDP	56.89
Piasau	Sebastian Ting Chiew Yew	SUPP	57.83
Balai Ringin	Snowdan Lawan	PRS	58.10
Senadin	Lee Kim Shin	SUPP	58.84
Bukit Semuja	John Ilus	PBB	59.64
Safe
Beting Maro	Razaili Gapor	PBB	60.14
Machan	Allan Siden Gramong	PBB	60.43
Mulu	Gerawat Gala	PBB	61.08
Layar	Gerald Rentap Jabu	PBB	61.10
Samalaju	Majang Renggi	PRS	61.34
Bawang Assan	Wong Soon Koh	UPP	61.62
Lingga	Simoi Peri	PBB	66.84
Lambir	Ripin Lamat	PBB	68.66
Jepak	Talib Zulpilip	PBB	68.82
Bukit Goram	Jefferson Jamit Unyat	PBB	69.57
Sebuyau	Julaihi Narawi	PBB	69.88
Engkilili	Johnical Rayong Ngipa	UPP	70.75
Simunjan	Awla Idris	PBB	71.14
Bekenu	Rosey Yunus	PBB	71.68
Kedup	Martin Ben	PBB	73.23
Tarat	Roland Sagah Wee Inn	PBB	73.61
Katibas	Ambrose Blikau Enturan	PBB	74.20
Batang Ai	Malcom Mussen Lamoh	PRS	74.20
Asajaya	Abdul Karim Rahman Hamzah	PBB	74.72
Kakus	John Sikie Tayai	PRS	75.21
Batu Danau	Paulus Gumbang	PBB	75.37
Kemena	Stephen Rundi Utom	PBB	75.58
Balingian	Abdul Yakub Arbi	PBB	77.18
Kabong	Mohamad Chee Kadir	PBB	77.35
Jemoreng	Dr. Juanda Jaya	PBB	77.43
Kalaka	Abdul Wahab Aziz	PBB	77.57
Nangka	Dr. Annuar Rapaee	PBB	77.62
Gedong	Mohd. Naroden Majais	PBB	78.77
Satok	Abang Abdul Rahman Zohari Abang Openg	PBB	79.12
Tupong	Fazzrudin Abdul Rahman	PBB	79.12
Saribas	Mohammad Razi Sitam	PBB	79.57
Samariang	Sharifah Hasidah Sayeed Aman Ghazali	PBB	80.16
Muara Tuang	Idris Buang	PBB	81.61
Sadong Jaya	Aidel Lariwoo	PBB	82.22
Pelagus	Wilsong Nyabong Ijang	PRS	82.26
Stakan	Mohamad Ali Mahmud	PBB	83.22
Bukit Saban	Douglas Uggah Embas	PBB	85.66
Semop	Abdullah Saidol	PBB	85.77
Tebedu	Michael Manyin Jawong	PBB	86.34
Bukit Begunan	Mong Dagang	PRS	86.65
Pantai Damai	Dr. Abdul Rahman Junaidi	PBB	86.62
Demak Laut	Dr. Hazland Abang Hipni	PBB	88.07
Tellian	Yussibnosh Balo	PBB	88.42
Kuala Rajang	Len Talif Salleh	PBB	88.60
Daro	Safiee Ahmad	PBB	89.78
Belaga	Liwan Lagang	PRS	89.96
Dalat	Fatimah Abdullah @ Ting Sai Ming	PBB	90.14
Baleh	Dr. James Jemut Masing	PRS	91.67
Tanjong Datu	Adenan Satem	PBB	93.15
Uncontested
Bukit Kota	Dr. Abdul Rahman Ismail	PBB	n/a
Bukit Sari	Awang Tengah Ali Hassan	PBB	n/a

NON-GOVERNMENT SEATS
Marginal
Pujut	Dr. Ting Tiong Choon	DAP	52.57
Ba'kelalan	Baru Bian	PKR	55.20
Fairly safe
Kota Sentosa	Chong Chieng Jen	DAP	58.16
Pelawan	David Wong Kee Woan	DAP	58.30
Krian	Ali Biju	PKR	58.98
Tanjong Batu	Chiew Chiu Sing	DAP	59.10
Safe
Bukit Assek	Irene Mary Chang Oi Ling	DAP	61.05
Batu Lintang	See Chee How	PKR	61.61
Pending	Violet Yong Wui Wui	DAP	62.60
Padungan	Wong King Wei	DAP	64.31

== Aftermath ==
=== Government formation ===
Adenan Satem formed the state cabinet after being invited by Abdul Taib Mahmud to begin a new government following 7 May 2016 state election in Sarawak. To be the Chief Minister, Adenan sworn in before the Yang di-Pertua Negeri at 10.00 p.m. Malaysia Standard Time on 7 May 2016 at The Astana, Sarawak.

This election would be Adenan's only election as Chief Minister and his final election altogether; he died in 2017. The election would also prove to be Barisan Nasional's last election in Sarawak; in the aftermath of the 2018 Malaysian general election and the defeat of BN, the four Sarawak component parties of BN exited the coalition to form a new Sarawak-based coalition Gabungan Parti Sarawak (GPS).
