= Sebastian Ting Chiew Yew =

Malaysian lawyer and politician

Yang Berhormat Datuk Sebastian Ting Chiew Yew PJN DIMP MLA
- 陳超耀

State Deputy Minister of Tourism, Creative Industry and Performing Arts of Sarawak
- Incumbent
- Assumed office 4 January 2022 Serving with Snowdan Lawan (Creative Industry and Performing Arts)
- Minister: Abdul Karim Rahman Hamzah
- Governor: Abdul Taib Mahmud Wan Junaidi Tuanku Jaafar
- Chief Minister: Abang Abdul Rahman Johari Abang Openg

State Deputy Minister of Tourism, Arts and Culture of Sarawak
- In office 22 August 2019 – 18 December 2021
- Minister: Abdul Karim Rahman Hamzah
- Governor: Abdul Taib Mahmud
- Chief Minister: Abang Abdul Rahman Johari Abang Openg
- Preceded by: Lee Kim Shin
- Constituency: Piasau

Member of the Sarawak State Legislative Assembly for Piasau
- Incumbent
- Assumed office 7 May 2016
- Preceded by: Alan Ling Sie Kiong (PH-DAP)
- Majority: 2,112 (2016); 4,988 (2021)

Secretary-General of the Sarawak United Peoples' Party
- Incumbent
- Assumed office 9 September 2014
- President: Sim Kui Hian
- Deputy: Sih Hua Tong; Ting Check Sii
- Preceded by: Sim Kui Hian

Personal details
- Born: Sebastian Ting Chiew Yew Crown Colony of Sarawak (now Sarawak, Malaysia)
- Citizenship: Malaysian
- Party: Sarawak United Peoples' Party (SUPP) (since 2004)
- Other political affiliations: Barisan Nasional (BN) (2004–2018); Gabungan Parti Sarawak (GPS) (since 2018)
- Education: North London Polytechnic (LL.B.); Darwin College, Cambridge (LL.M.)
- Occupation: Politician
- Profession: Lawyer

Sebastian Ting Chiew Yew (simplified Chinese: 陈超耀; traditional Chinese: 陳超耀; pinyin: Chén Chāoyào) is a Malaysian lawyer and politician from the Sarawak United Peoples' Party (SUPP), a component party of the ruling Gabungan Parti Sarawak (GPS) coalition. He has served as State Deputy Minister of Tourism, Creative Industry and Performing Arts of Sarawak in charge of Tourism in the GPS administration under Chief Minister Abang Abdul Rahman Johari Abang Openg and Minister Abdul Karim Rahman Hamzah since January 2022 and Member of the Sarawak State Legislative Assembly (MLA) for Piasau since May 2016. He served as State Deputy Minister of Tourism, Arts and Culture of Sarawak from August 2019 to December 2021. He has also served as Secretary-General of SUPP since September 2014.

== Early life and education ==
Ting attended the North London Polytechnic between 1979 and 1982 before graduating with a Bachelor of Laws (LL.B.) with second class honours, first division. Immediately after, he pursued his postgraduate studies at Darwin College, Cambridge and subsequently graduated with a Master of Laws (LL.M.) with second class honours, second division. He returned to Malaysia upon completion of his studies and became a legal assistant at Wan Ullok Jugah Chin & Co Advocates in September 1984. From 1988 to April 2004, he served as the Managing Partner of the same law firm.

== Political career ==
Ting was political secretary to former Minister of Plantation Industries and Commodities of Malaysia, Miri MP and former SUPP president Peter Chin Fah Kui for a period of nine years between May 2004 and April 2009 and later when Chin was reassigned as Minister of Energy, Green Technology and Water until May 2013. After Chin's retirement from public office in 2014, then-SUPP secretary-general and Ting's direct predecessor, Sim Kui Hian, was elected as Chin's successor and Ting was subsequently made secretary-general. Prior to this, he had already been serving the party in the capacity of Publicity and Information secretary. He first tried his luck in an election for public office when he was nominated by SUPP as its candidate for the Miri parliamentary seat, but failed to win.

In Ting's second election, he managed to win back the Piasau state seat from the Democratic Action Party's (DAP) Sarawak state liaison committee secretary, Alan Ling Sie Kiong, in a battle dubbed the "Battle of secretaries-general". In late 2017, Ting retained his post as SUPP secretary-general for a third term between 2018 and 2020 after the party received no nomination forms for the office. In the historic 14th Malaysian general election that took place in May 2018, Ting once again contested for the Miri parliamentary seat but yet again failed to wrestle the seat from the incumbent, Michael Teo Yu Keng of PKR. The SUPP's disastrous showing in the election, where it only won one of the seven parliamentary seats it contested, led to some calling for Ting to resign as secretary-general, citing his supposed no-show post-election.

On 22 August 2019, it was announced by the Chief Minister of Sarawak, Abang Abdul Rahman Johari Abang Openg, that in a minor cabinet reshuffle, Ting was appointed as assistant Minister for Tourism, Arts and Culture. Ting's predecessor and long-time assistant minister in the Government of Sarawak, Lee Kim Shin, was promoted to full ministership.

On 30 December 2021, Chief Minister Abang Johari unveiled his new Cabinet lineup. Ting was then appointed as Assistant Minister of Tourism, Creative Industry and Performing Arts in charge of Tourism on 4 January 2022.

== Election results ==
Parliament of Malaysia
Year	Constituency	Candidate	Votes	Pct	Opponent(s)	Votes	Pct	Ballots cast	Majority	Turnout
2013	P219 Miri	Sebastian Ting Chiew Yew (SUPP)	24,917	47.80%	Michael Teo Yu Keng (PKR)	26,909	51.62%	52,813	1,992	74.21%
2013	P219 Miri	Sebastian Ting Chiew Yew (SUPP)	24,917	47.80%	Chong Kon Fatt (STAR)	306	0.59%	52,813	1,992	74.21%
2018	P219 Miri	Sebastian Ting Chiew Yew (SUPP)	22,076	38.18%	Michael Teo Yu Keng (PKR)	35,739	61.82%	58,439	13,663	72.70%

Sarawak State Legislative Assembly
Year	Constituency	Candidate	Votes	Pct	Opponent(s)	Votes	Pct	Ballots cast	Majority	Turnout
2016	N73 Piasau	Sebastian Ting Chiew Yew (SUPP)	7,799	57.83%	Alan Ling Sie Kiong (DAP)	5,687	42.17%	13,634	2,112	64.55%
2021	N73 Piasau	Sebastian Ting Chiew Yew (SUPP)	6,790	66.61%	Peter Hee (DAP)	1,802	17.68%	10.194	4,988	48.59%
2021	N73 Piasau	Sebastian Ting Chiew Yew (SUPP)	6,790	66.61%	Teo Jia Jun (PSB)	816	8.00%	10.194	4,988	48.59%
2021	N73 Piasau	Sebastian Ting Chiew Yew (SUPP)	6,790	66.61%	Chung Siew Yen (PBK)	665	6.52%	10.194	4,988	48.59%
2021	N73 Piasau	Sebastian Ting Chiew Yew (SUPP)	6,790	66.61%	Hanim Jaraee (ASPIRASI)	121	1.19%	10.194	4,988	48.59%

== Honours ==
- Malaysia
  - Commander of the Order of Meritorious Service (PJN) – Datuk (2017)
- Pahang
  - Knight Companion of the Order of the Crown of Pahang (DIMP) – Dato' (2009)

== See also ==
- Miri (federal constituency)
- Piasau (state constituency)
