= Snowdan Lawan =

Malaysian politician

Yang Berhormat Datuk Snowdan Lawan PGBK AMN MLA
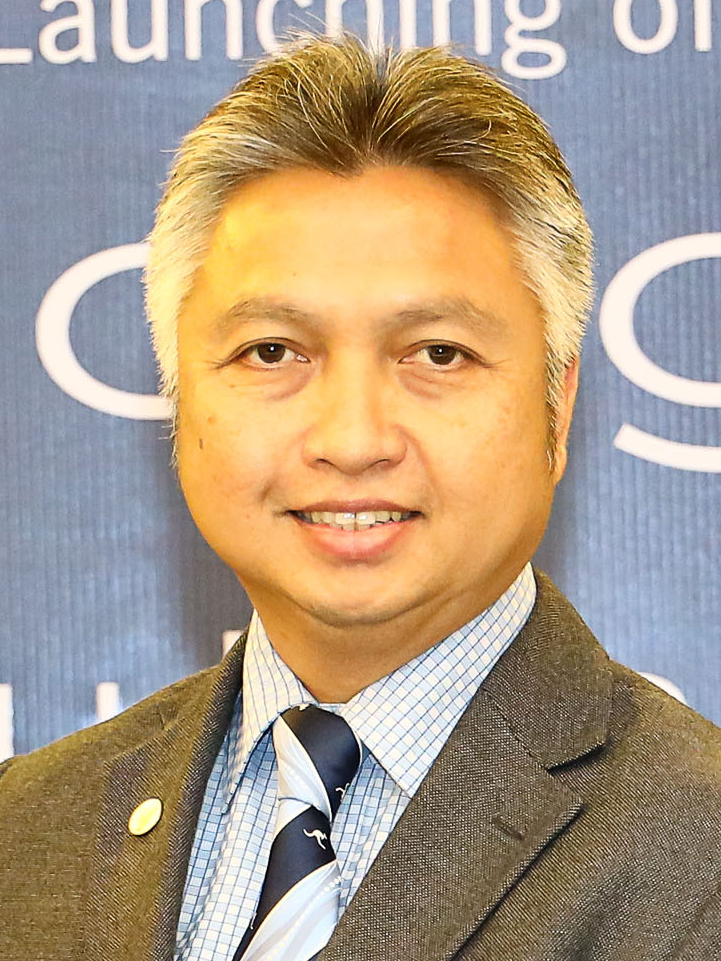
- Snowdan in 2019

State Deputy Minister of Tourism, Creative Industry and Performing Arts of Sarawak (Creative Industry and Performing Arts)
- Incumbent
- Assumed office 4 January 2022 Serving with Sebastian Ting Chiew Yew (Tourism)
- Minister: Abdul Karim Rahman Hamzah
- Governor: Abdul Taib Mahmud Wan Junaidi Tuanku Jaafar
- Chief Minister: Abang Abdul Rahman Johari Abang Openg
- Preceded by: Sebastian Ting Chiew Yew (State Deputy Minister of Tourism, Arts and Culture)
- Constituency: Balai Ringin

State Deputy Minister of Youth and Sports of Sarawak
- In office 7 May 2017 – 2 January 2022
- Minister: Abdul Karim Rahman Hamzah
- Governor: Abdul Taib Mahmud
- Chief Minister: Abang Abdul Rahman Johari Abang Openg
- Preceded by: Abdul Karim Rahman Hamzah
- Succeeded by: Gerald Rentap Jabu (State Deputy Minister of Youth, Sports and Entrepreneur Development (Youth and Sports Development))
- Constituency: Balai Ringin

Youth Chief of the Parti Rakyat Sarawak
- Incumbent
- Assumed office 24 October 2016
- President: James Jemut Masing (2016-2021); Joseph Salang Gandum (2021-)
- Preceded by: Liwan Lagang

Member of the Sarawak State Legislative Assembly for Balai Ringin
- Incumbent
- Assumed office 20 May 2006
- Preceded by: Position established
- Majority: 1,516 (2006); 2,885 (2011); 2,039 (2016); 1,285 (2021)

Personal details
- Born: 5 September 1971 (age 55) Sarawak, Malaysia
- Citizenship: Malaysian
- Party: Parti Rakyat Sarawak (PRS) (2006-2026); Parti Alternatif Perjuangan Sarawak (PAPS) (since 2026)
- Other political affiliations: Barisan Nasional (BN) (-2018, allied : since 2022); Perikatan Nasional (PN) (2020-2022); Gabungan Parti Sarawak (GPS) (2018-2026)
- Relations: Donald Lawan (father)

Snowdan Donald Lawan (born 5 September 1971) is a Malaysian politician from the Parti Rakyat Sarawak (PRS), a component party of the ruling Gabungan Parti Sarawak (GPS) coalition who has served as the State Deputy Minister of Tourism, Creative Industry and Performing Arts of Sarawak in charge of Creative Industry and Performing Arts in the GPS state administration under Premier Abang Abdul Rahman Johari Abang Openg and Minister Abdul Karim Rahman Hamzah since January 2022 and Member of the Sarawak State Legislative Assembly (MLA) for Balai Ringin since May 2006. He served as State Deputy Minister of Youth and Sports of Sarawak in the GPS and Barisan Nasional (BN) state administrations under Premier Abang Johari and Minister Abdul Karim from May 2017 to January 2022. He has also served as Youth Chief of PRS since October 2016.

== Election results ==
Sarawak State Legislative Assembly
Year	Constituency	Candidate	Votes	Pct	Opponent(s)	Votes	Pct	Ballots Cast	Majority	Turnout
2006	Balai Ringin	Snowdan Lawan (PRS)	3,075	62.60%	Ibi Uding (SNAP)	1,559	29.00%	5,376	1,516	5,470
2006	Balai Ringin	Snowdan Lawan (PRS)	3,075	62.60%	Cobbold Lusoi (IND)	742	13.80%	5,376	1,516	5,470
2011	Balai Ringin	Snowdan Lawan (PRS)	4,145	64.63%	Ibi Uding (PKR)	1,260	19.65%	6,413	2,885	6,544
2011	Balai Ringin	Snowdan Lawan (PRS)	4,145	64.63%	Dan Giang (SNAP)	765	11.93%	6,413	2,885	6,544
2011	Balai Ringin	Snowdan Lawan (PRS)	4,145	64.63%	Sujal Gansi (PCM)	126	1.96%	6,413	2,885	6,544
2011	Balai Ringin	Snowdan Lawan (PRS)	4,145	64.63%	Cobbold Lusoi (IND)	85	1.33%	6,413	2,885	6,544
2011	Balai Ringin	Snowdan Lawan (PRS)	4,145	64.63%	Sujal Gansi (IND)	32	0.50%	6,413	2,885	6,544
2016	Balai Ringin	Snowdan Lawan (PRS)	4,478	58.10%	Entusa Imam (IND)	2,439	31.65%	7,707	2,039	7,794
2016	Balai Ringin	Snowdan Lawan (PRS)	4,478	58.10%	Nicholas Mujah Ason (PKR)	700	9.08%	7,707	2,039	7,794
2016	Balai Ringin	Snowdan Lawan (PRS)	4,478	58.10%	Pok Ungkut (PBDSB)	90	1.17%	7,707	2,039	7,794
2021	Balai Ringin	Snowdan Lawan (PRS)	4,816	56.38%	Masir Kujat (PSB)	3,531	41.34%	8,542	1,285	79.17%
2021	Balai Ringin	Snowdan Lawan (PRS)	4,816	56.38%	Kasim Mana (PBK)	195	2.28%	8,542	1,285	79.17%

== Honours ==
- Malaysia
  - Member of the Order of the Defender of the Realm (AMN) (2011)
- Sarawak
  - Commander of the Order of the Star of Hornbill Sarawak (PGBK) – Datuk (2017)

== See also ==
- Balai Ringin (state constituency)
