= Pelawan =

Electoral district in Sarawak, Malaysia

Pelawan (N54)
Sarawak constituency

State constituency
- Legislature: Sarawak State Legislative Assembly
MLA
Vacant
- Constituency created: 1996
- First contested: 1996
- Last contested: 2026

Pelawan is a state constituency in Sarawak, Malaysia, that has been represented in the Sarawak State Legislative Assembly since 1996.

The state constituency was created in the 1996 redistribution and is mandated to return a single member to the Sarawak State Legislative Assembly under the first past the post voting system.

== Demographics ==
Ethnic breakdown of Pelawan's electorate as of 2022
1. Chinese (90.9%)
2. Malay-Muslim bumiputera (4.50%)
3. Sarawak bumiputera (4.50%)
4. Other ethnicities (0.40%)

== History ==
As of 2020, Pelawan has a population of 41,978 people.

=== Polling districts ===
According to the gazette issued on 31 October 2022, the Pelawan constituency has a total of 11 polling districts.

State constituency	Polling Districts	Code	Location
Pelawan (N54)	Rajang Park	212/54/01	Tadika Taman Rajang
Pelawan (N54)	Pelawan	212/54/02	SJK (C) Tung Hua
Pelawan (N54)	Sungai Merah	212/54/03	SMJK Tiong Hin
Pelawan (N54)	Disa	212/54/04	SJK (C) Tiong Hin
Pelawan (N54)	Sungai Antu	212/54/05	Kolej Vokesional Sibu
Pelawan (N54)	Gambir	212/54/06	SJK (C) Guong Ann; Tadika Sing Ang Tong; SK Jalan Deshon
Pelawan (N54)	Camar	212/54/07	SJK (C) Su Lai
Pelawan (N54)	Merdeka	212/54/08	SJK (C) Taman Rajang
Pelawan (N54)	Oya Lane	212/54/09	SMK Deshon
Pelawan (N54)	Indah	212/54/10	SMA Sibu
Pelawan (N54)	Nibong	212/54/11	SMK Kpg. Nangka

=== Representation history ===
Members of the Legislative Assembly for Pelawan
Assembly	No	Years	Member	Party
Constituency created from Seduan and Bukit Assek
14th	N42	1996-2001	Wong Sing Nang (黄新楠)	DAP
15th	N42	2001-2006	Vincent Goh Chung Siong (吴春祥)	BN (SUPP)
16th	N48	2006-2011	Vincent Goh Chung Siong (吴春祥)	BN (SUPP)
17th	N48	2011-2016	David Wong Kee Woan (黃培根)	PR (DAP)
18th	N54	2016-2021	David Wong Kee Woan (黃培根)	PH (DAP)
19th	N54	2021–2026	Michael Tiang Ming Tee (程明志)	GPS (SUPP)

== Election results ==
Sarawak state election, 2026: Pelawan
Party	Candidate	Votes	%	∆%
GPS				▲
DAP	Irene Wong Lee Ting			▲
Total valid votes				
Total rejected ballots				
Unreturned ballots				
Turnout				
Registered electors				
Majority				

Sarawak state election, 2021: Pelawan
Party	Candidate	Votes	%	∆%
GPS	Michael Tiang Ming Tee	4,413	27.70	▲27.70
DAP	David Wong Kee Woan	4,313	27.07	▼31.23
PSB	Low Chong Nguan	3,757	23.58	▲23.58
PBK	Jamie Tiew Yen Houng	3,146	19.75	▲19.75
ASPIRASI	Janet Loh Wui Ping	302	1.90	▲1.90
Total valid votes		15,932	100.00	
Total rejected ballots		108		
Unreturned ballots		263		
Turnout		16,302	47.30	▼22.90
Registered electors		34,466		
Majority		100	0.63	▼18.61
GPS gain from DAP		Swing		?
Source(s) https://lom.agc.gov.my/ilims/upload/portal/akta/outputp/1718688/PUB687.pdf

Sarawak state election, 2016: Pelawan
Party	Candidate	Votes	%	∆%
DAP	David Wong Kee Woan	13,056	58.30	▼7.48
BN	Lau Ung Hie	8,742	39.04	▲4.82
STAR	Priscilla Lau	597	2.66	▲2.66
Total valid votes		22,395	100.00	
Total rejected ballots		174		
Unreturned ballots		59		
Turnout		22,628	70.20	▼0.54
Registered electors		32,233		
Majority		4,314	19.26	▲17.44
DAP hold		Swing		
Source(s) "Federal Government Gazette - Notice of Contested Election, State Legislative Assembly of the State of Sarawak [P.U. (B) 190/2016]" (PDF). Attorney General's Chambers of Malaysia. 25 April 2016. Archived from the original (PDF) on 12 June 2017. "Senarai Calon yang Disahkan Layak Bertanding Pilihan Raya Dewan Undangan Negeri ke-11". Election Commission of Malaysia. 25 April 2016. Archived from the original on 25 April 2016.

Sarawak state election, 2011: Pelawan
Party	Candidate	Votes	%	∆%
DAP	David Wong Kee Woan	13,318	65.78	▲16.69
BN	Vincent Goh Chung Siong	6,927	34.22	▼16.69
Total valid votes		20,245	100.00	
Total rejected ballots		91		
Unreturned ballots		43		
Turnout		20,379	70.74	▲6.08
Registered electors		28,808		
Majority		6,391	31.57	▲29.75
DAP gain from BN		Swing		?
Source(s) "Federal Government Gazette - Results of Contested Election and Statements of the Poll after the Official Addition of Votes Sarawak [P.U. (B) 245/2011]" (PDF). Attorney General's Chambers of Malaysia. 29 April 2011.

Sarawak state election, 2006: Pelawan
Party	Candidate	Votes	%	∆%
BN	Vincent Goh Chung Siong	7,375	50.91	▼20.40
DAP	Ting Chek Ming	7,112	49.09	▲20.40
Total valid votes		14,487	100.00	
Total rejected ballots		83		
Unreturned ballots		17		
Turnout		14,587	64.66	▼4.84
Registered electors		22,559		
Majority		263	1.82	▼40.50
BN hold		Swing		

Sarawak state election, 2001: Pelawan
Party	Candidate	Votes	%	
BN	Vincent Goh Chung Siong	14,129	71.31	▲24.80
DAP	Ting Chek Ming	5,684	28.69	▼24.80
Total valid votes		19,813	100.00	
Total rejected ballots		123		
Unreturned ballots		25		
Turnout		19,961	69.50	▲1.77
Registered electors		28,722		
Majority		8,445	42.62	▲35.68
BN gain from DAP		Swing		?

Sarawak state election, 1996: Pelawan
Party	Candidate	Votes	%
DAP	Wong Sing Nang	7,460	53.49
BN	Vincent Goh Chung Siong	6,486	46.51
Total valid votes		13,946	100.00
Total rejected ballots		65	
Unreturned ballots		32	
Turnout		14,043	67.73
Registered electors		20,733	
Majority		974	6.98
This was a new constituency created.
