= Piasau (state constituency) =

State constituency in Sarawak, Malaysia

Piasau (N73)
Sarawak constituency

State constituency
- Legislature: Sarawak State Legislative Assembly
MLA
Vacant
- Constituency created: 1987
- First contested: 1991
- Last contested: 2026

Piasau is a state constituency in Sarawak, Malaysia, that has been represented in the Sarawak State Legislative Assembly since 1991.

The state constituency was created in the 1987 redistribution and is mandated to return a single member to the Sarawak State Legislative Assembly under the first past the post voting system.

== Demographics ==
Ethnic breakdown of Piasau's electorate as of 2022
1. Chinese (53.7%)
2. Malay-Muslim bumiputera (23.6%)
3. Sarawak bumiputera (20.5%)
4. Other ethnicities (2.20%)

== History ==
As of 2020, Piasau has a population of 34,612 people.

=== Polling districts ===
According to the gazette issued on 31 October 2022, the Piasau constituency has a total of 9 polling districts.

State constituency	Polling Districts	Code	Location
Piasau (N73)	Kubu	219/73/01	SMK Saint Columbia
Piasau (N73)	Bazzar	219/73/02	SJK (C) Chung Hua Miri; SK Saint Joseph Miri
Piasau (N73)	Merbau	219/73/03	SK Jln. Bintang
Piasau (N73)	Merpati	219/73/04	SRA Rakyat Miri (Madrasah As-Syibyan)
Piasau (N73)	Permaisuri	219/73/05	SK South; SK Pulau Melayu
Piasau (N73)	Bintang	219/73/06	SJK (C) North
Piasau (N73)	Lutong	219/73/07	SJK (C) Chung Hua Lutong; SMK Lutong; SK Lutong
Piasau (N73)	Tanjong	219/73/08	SMJK Chung Hua
Piasau (N73)	Luak	219/73/09	SK Kpg. Luak

=== Representation history ===
Members of the Legislative Assembly for Piasau
Assembly	No	Years	Member	Party
Constituency created from Miri
13th	N52	1991–1996	George Chan Hong Nam (陈康南)	BN (SUPP)
14th	N56	1996–2001	George Chan Hong Nam (陈康南)	BN (SUPP)
15th	N56	2001–2006	George Chan Hong Nam (陈康南)	BN (SUPP)
16th	N63	2006–2011	George Chan Hong Nam (陈康南)	BN (SUPP)
17th	N63	2011–2016	Alan Ling Sie Kiong (林思健)	PR (DAP)
18th	N73	2016–2018	Sebastian Ting Chiew Yew (陈超耀)	BN (SUPP)
18th	N73	2018–2021	Sebastian Ting Chiew Yew (陈超耀)	GPS (SUPP)
19th	N73	2021–2026	Sebastian Ting Chiew Yew (陈超耀)	GPS (SUPP)

== Election results ==
Sarawak state election, 2026
Party	Candidate	Votes	%	∆%
GPS				▲
PH				▲
Total valid votes				
Total rejected ballots				
Unreturned ballots				
Turnout				
Registered electors				
Majority				

Sarawak state election, 2021
Party	Candidate	Votes	%	∆%
GPS	Sebastian Ting Chiew Yew	6,790	66.61	▲66.61
DAP	Peter Hee	1,802	17.68	▼24.49
PSB	Teo Jia Jun	816	8.00	▲8.00
PBK	Devora Chung Shiew Yen	665	6.52	▲6.52
ASPIRASI	Hani Jaraee	121	1.19	▲1.19
Total valid votes		10,194	100.00	
Total rejected ballots		59		
Unreturned ballots		23		
Turnout		10,276	48.07	▼16.48
Registered electors		21,377		
Majority		4,988	48.93	▲33.27
GPS gain from BN		Swing		?
Source(s) https://lom.agc.gov.my/ilims/upload/portal/akta/outputp/1718688/PUB687.pdf

Sarawak state election, 2016
Party	Candidate	Votes	%	∆%
BN	Sebastian Ting Chiew Yew	7,799	57.83	▲15.47
DAP	Alan Ling Sie Kiong	5,687	42.17	▼15.47
Total valid votes		13,486	100.00	
Total rejected ballots		123		
Unreturned ballots		25		
Turnout		13,634	64.55	▲1.42
Registered electors		21,120		
Majority		2,112	15.66	▲0.38
BN gain from DAP		Swing		?
Source(s) "Federal Government Gazette - Notice of Contested Election, State Legislative Assembly of the State of Sarawak [P.U. (B) 190/2016]" (PDF). Attorney General's Chambers of Malaysia. 25 April 2016. Archived from the original (PDF) on 12 June 2017. "Senarai Calon yang Disahkan Layak Bertanding Pilihan Raya Dewan Undangan Negeri ke-11". Election Commission of Malaysia. 25 April 2016. Archived from the original on 25 April 2016.

Sarawak state election, 2011
Party	Candidate	Votes	%	∆%
DAP	Alan Ling Sie Kiong	5,998	57.64	▲57.64
BN	George Chan Hong Nam	4,408	42.36	▼28.87
Total valid votes		10,406	100.00	
Total rejected ballots		73		
Unreturned ballots		0		
Turnout		10,479	63.13	▲9.04
Registered electors		16,600		
Majority		1,590	15.28	▼27.18
DAP gain from BN		Swing		?
Source(s) "Federal Government Gazette - Results of Contested Election and Statements of the Poll after the Official Addition of Votes Sarawak [P.U. (B) 245/2011]" (PDF). Attorney General's Chambers of Malaysia. 29 April 2011.

Sarawak state election, 2006
Party	Candidate	Votes	%	∆%
BN	George Chan Hong Nam	6,573	71.23	▼8.74
PKR	Ngu Hee Hieng	2,655	28.77	▲28.77
Total valid votes		9,228	100.00	
Total rejected ballots		93		
Unreturned ballots		13		
Turnout		9,334	54.09	▼6.57
Registered electors		17,256		
Majority		3,918	42.46	▼17.48
BN hold		Swing		

Sarawak state election, 2001
Party	Candidate	Votes	%	∆%
BN	George Chan Hong Nam	10,237	79.97	▲8.84
DAP	John Law Ching Sing	2,564	20.03	▼8.84
Total valid votes		12,801	100.00	
Total rejected ballots		89		
Unreturned ballots		31		
Turnout		12,921	60.66	▲1.76
Registered electors		21,301		
Majority		7,673	59.94	▲17.68
BN hold		Swing		

Sarawak state election, 1996
Party	Candidate	Votes	%	∆%
BN	George Chan Hong Nam	8,737	71.13	▼3.76
DAP	John Law Ching Sing	3,546	28.87	▲3.76
Total valid votes		12,283	100.00	
Total rejected ballots		109		
Unreturned ballots		43		
Turnout		12,435	58.90	▼1.57
Registered electors		21,111		
Majority		5,191	42.26	▼7.52
BN hold		Swing		

Sarawak state election, 1991
Party	Candidate	Votes	%	∆%
BN	George Chan Hong Nam	13,634	74.89	
DAP	Chong Kon Fatt	4,571	25.11	
Total valid votes		18,205	100.00	
Total rejected ballots		198		
Unreturned ballots		74		
Turnout		18,477	60.47	
Registered electors		30,557		
Majority		9,063	49.78	
This was a new constituency created.
