= Matu-Daro =

Sarawak constituency

Defunct state constituency
- Legislature: Sarawak State Legislative Assembly
- Constituency created: 1968
- Constituency abolished: 2006
- First contested: 1969
- Last contested: 2001

Matu-Daro was a state constituency in Sarawak, Malaysia, that was represented in the Sarawak State Legislative Assembly from 1969 to 2006.

The state constituency was created in the 1968 redistribution and was mandated to return a single member to the Sarawak State Legislative Assembly under the first past the post voting system.

== History ==
It was abolished in 2006 after it was redistributed.

=== Representation history ===
Members of the Legislative Assembly for Matu-Daro
Assembly	No	Years	Member	Party
Constituency created
Matu-Daro
8th	N25	1970-1973	Awang Hipni Pengiran Anu	BUMIPUTERA
8th	N25	1973-1974	Awang Hipni Pengiran Anu	BN (PBB)
9th	N25	1974-1979	Awang Hipni Pengiran Anu	BN (PBB)
10th	N24	1979-1981	Abdul Rahman Ya'kub	BN (PBB)
11th	N24	1983-1987	Abdul Wahab Dollah	BN (PBB)
12th	N24	1987-1991	Abdul Wahab Dollah	BN (PBB)
13th	N30	1991-1996	Abdul Wahab Dollah	BN (PBB)
Matu Daro
14th	N32	1996-2001	Abdul Wahab Dollah	BN (PBB)
15th	N32	2001-2006	Abdul Wahab Dollah	BN (PBB)
Constituency abolished, split to Jemoreng and Daro

== Election results ==
Sarawak state election, 2001: Matu-Daro
Party	Candidate	Votes	%	∆%
BN	Abdul Wahab Dollah	5,893	80.11	▼2.78
Independent	Noh Saabi	1,463	19.89	▲2.78
Total valid votes		7,356	100.00	
Total rejected ballots		144		
Unreturned ballots		14		
Turnout		7,514	71.90	▼0.84
Registered electors		10,451		
Majority		4,430	60.22	▼5.55
BN hold		Swing		

Sarawak state election, 1996: Matu-Daro
Party	Candidate	Votes	%	∆%
BN	Abdul Wahab Dollah	5,769	82.89	▲8.80
Independent	Mostapa Kusairi	1,191	17.11	▲17.11
Total valid votes		6,960	100.00	
Total rejected ballots		188		
Unreturned ballots		19		
Turnout		7,167	72.74	▼2.36
Registered electors		9,853		
Majority		4,578	65.78	▲9.14
BN hold		Swing		

Sarawak state election, 1991: Matu-Daro
Party	Candidate	Votes	%	∆%
BN	Abdul Wahab Dollah	4,572	74.09	▲15.04
PERMAS	Yusuf Abdul Rahman	1,077	17.45	▼23.50
DAP	Asbor Abdullah	437	7.08	▲7.08
NEGARA	Isnawi Sirat	85	1.38	▲1.38
Total valid votes		6,171	100.00	
Total rejected ballots		133		
Unreturned ballots		1		
Turnout		6,305	75.10	▼4.16
Registered electors		8,396		
Majority		3,495	56.64	▲38.54
BN hold		Swing		

Sarawak state election, 1987: Matu-Daro
Party	Candidate	Votes	%	∆%
BN	Abdul Wahab Dollah	5,302	59.05	
PERMAS	Abdul Rahman Ya'kub	3,677	40.95	
Total valid votes		8,979	100.00	
Total rejected ballots		133		
Unreturned ballots		0		
Turnout		9,112	79.26	▲79.26
Registered electors		11,497		
Majority		1,625	18.10	▲18.10
BN hold		Swing		

Sarawak state election, 1983: Matu-Daro
Party	Candidate	Votes	%	∆%
On the nomination day, Abdul Wahab Dollah won uncontested.
BN	Abdul Wahab Dollah			
Total valid votes			100.00	
Total rejected ballots				
Unreturned ballots				
Turnout				
Registered electors		11,109		
Majority				
BN hold		Swing		

Sarawak state election, 1979: Matu-Daro
Party	Candidate	Votes	%	∆%
BN	Abdul Rahman Ya'kub	6,827	92.64	▲3.46
PAJAR	Eden Abdullah	542	7.36	▲7.36
Total valid votes		7,369	100.00	
Total rejected ballots		162		
Unreturned ballots		0		
Turnout		7,531	73.58	▼2.56
Registered electors		10,235		
Majority		6,285	85.29	▲6.91
BN hold		Swing		

Sarawak state election, 1974: Matu-Daro
Party	Candidate	Votes	%	∆%
BN	Awang Hipni Pengiran Anu	4,447	89.19	▲89.19
SNAP	Abang Amin Abang Abdul Salim	539	10.81	▲8.41
Total valid votes		4,986	100.00	
Total rejected ballots		363		
Unreturned ballots		0		
Turnout		5,349	76.14	▼10.37
Registered electors		7,025		
Majority		3,908	78.38	▲24.28
BN gain from PBB		Swing		?

Sarawak state election, 1969: Matu-Daro
Party	Candidate	Votes	%
PBB	Awang Hipni Pengiran Anu	3,360	65.04
PESAKA	Awang Mansor Awang Laga	565	10.94
SUPP	George Drahman	506	9.79
Independent	Waini Sahari	429	8.30
Independent	Sia Siong Yung	136	2.63
SNAP	Abang Abdul Razak	124	2.40
Independent	Rosli Kiok	46	0.89
Total valid votes		5,166	100.00
Total rejected ballots		286	
Unreturned ballots		0	
Turnout		5,452	86.51
Registered electors		6,302	
Majority		2,795	54.10
This was a new constituency created.
