= Pelagus =

State constituency in Sarawak, Malaysia

Pelagus (N61)
Sarawak constituency

State constituency
- Legislature: Sarawak State Legislative Assembly
MLA
Vacant
- Constituency created: 1968
- First contested: 1969
- Last contested: 2026

Pelagus is a state constituency in Sarawak, Malaysia, that has been represented in the Sarawak State Legislative Assembly since 1969.

Established during the 1968 redistribution, the constituency is required to elect a single member to the Sarawak State Legislative Assembly using the first-past-the-post voting system.

== Demographics ==
Ethnic breakdown of Pelagus's electorate as of 2022
1. Sarawak bumiputera (97.7%)
2. Malay-Muslim bumiputera (0.90%)
3. Chinese (0.70%)
4. Other ethnicities (0.70%)

== History ==
As of 2020, Pelagus has a population of 11,877 people.

=== Polling districts ===
According to the gazette issued on 31 October 2022, the Pelagus constituency has a total of 4 polling districts.

State constituency	Polling Districts	Code	Location
Pelagus（N61）	Pelagus	215/61/01	RH Bunyau Pulau Pisang; RH Mengga Ng. Semenuang; RH Jelani Kerangan Bangat Batang Rajang; SK Ng. Encheremin; RH Seliong; RH Rabar Ng; RII Jengeng Ng Mela; SK Ng. Pelagus; RH Achong Ng. Benin; SK Ulu Pelagus; RH Antau Sg Pelagus; RH George Sg. Pelagus
Pelagus（N61）	Sungai Amang	215/61/02	SK Sg. Amang
Pelagus（N61）	Nanga Peraran	215/61/03	SK Ng. Peraran; RH Budit Ng. Mekey; RH Jelanie Ng Sama; RH Sabang Ng Buya; RH Johnny Sg. Sut
Pelagus（N61）	Sut	215/61/04	RH Johnny Sg. Sut; RH Sanggau Sg. Sut; RH Belikau Sg. Sut; RH Jugah Sut; RH Baraoh Tembawai Sandong Baroh; RH Emak; RH Al, Entawau Ulu; RH Mamot; RH Taing; SK Ng. Bena; RH Nyawai Sg. Bena; RH Nyawai; RH Naga; SK Ng. Kebiaw; SK Lepong Balleh; RH Gawan; SK Ng Mujong; SK Ng Bawai; RH Bengau Sg. Sut

=== Representation history ===
Members of the Legislative Assembly for Pelagus
Assembly	No	Years	Member	Party
Constituency created
8th	N38	1970-1971	Bennet Jarrow	PESAKA
8th	N38	1971-1973	Leonard Linggi Jugah	PESAKA
8th	N38	1973-1974	Leonard Linggi Jugah	BN (PBB)
9th	N38	1974-1979	Jonathan Sabai Ajing	SNAP
10th	N38	1979-1983	Jonathan Sabai Ajing	BN (SNAP)
11th	N38	1983-1987	Nueng Kudi	SNAP
12th	N38	1987-1991	Philimon Nuing	PBDS
13th	N45	1991-1996	Sng Chee Hua (孙志桦)	PBDS
14th	N48	1996-2001	Sng Chee Hua (孙志桦)	BN (PBDS)
15th	N48	2001-2004	Larry Sng Wei Shien (孙伟瑄)	BN (PBDS)
15th	N48	2004-2006	Larry Sng Wei Shien (孙伟瑄)	BN (PRS)
16th	N54	2006–2011	Larry Sng Wei Shien (孙伟瑄)	BN (PRS)
17th	N54	2011-2012	George Lagong	Independent
17th	N54	2012-2014	George Lagong	SWP
17th	N54	2014	George Lagong	TERAS
17th	N54	2015	George Lagong	SWP
17th	N54	2016	George Lagong	Independent
18th	N61	2016-2018	Wilson Nyabong Ijang	BN (PRS)
18th	N61	2018- 2021	Wilson Nyabong Ijang	GPS (PRS)
19th	N61	2021–2026	Wilson Nyabong Ijang	GPS (PRS)

== Election results ==
Sarawak state election, 2026: Pelagus
Party	Candidate	Votes	%	∆%
GPS				▲
PH				▲
Total valid votes				
Total rejected ballots				
Unreturned ballots				
Turnout				
Registered electors				
Majority				

Sarawak state election, 2021: Pelagus
Party	Candidate	Votes	%	∆%
GPS	Wilson Nyabong Ijang	2,843	56.29	▲56.29
PSB	Kristoffer Nyuak Bajok	1,794	35.52	▲35.52
DAP	Solomon Kumbong	250	4.95	▼5.81
PBK	Nyambong Sibat	88	1.74	▲1.74
PBDS Baru	Moses Ripai	76	1.50	▲1.50
Total valid votes		5,051	100.00	
Total rejected ballots		89		
Unreturned ballots		13		
Turnout		5,153	65.28	
Registered electors		7,894		
Majority		1,049	20.77	
GPS gain from BN		Swing		?
Source(s) https://lom.agc.gov.my/ilims/upload/portal/akta/outputp/1718688/PUB687.pdf

Sarawak state election, 2016: Pelagus
Party	Candidate	Votes	%	∆%
BN	Wilson Nyabong Ijang	3,778	82.26	▲52.68
DAP	Frankie Bendindang Manjah	494	10.76	▲10.76
Independent	Yong Sibat	321	6.99	▲6.99
Total valid votes		4,593	100.00	
Total rejected ballots		60		
Unreturned ballots		12		
Turnout		4,665	64.92	
Registered electors		7,186		
Majority		3,284	71.50	
BN gain from Independent		Swing		?
Source(s) "Federal Government Gazette - Notice of Contested Election, State Legislative Assembly of the State of Sarawak [P.U. (B) 190/2016]" (PDF). Attorney General's Chambers of Malaysia. 25 April 2016. Archived from the original (PDF) on 12 June 2017. "Senarai Calon yang Disahkan Layak Bertanding Pilihan Raya Dewan Undangan Negeri ke-11". Election Commission of Malaysia. 25 April 2016. Archived from the original on 25 April 2016.

Sarawak state election, 2011: Pelagus
Party	Candidate	Votes	%	∆%
Independent	George Lagong	5,740	58.49	▲58.49
BN	Stanley Nyitar @ Unja Malang	2,903	29.58	▼35.03
PKR	Edward Sumbang Asun	1,171	11.93	▲11.93
Total valid votes		9,814	100.00	
Total rejected ballots		172		
Unreturned ballots		28		
Turnout		10,014	65.36	
Registered electors		15,322		
Majority		2,837	28.91	
Independent gain from BN		Swing		?
Source(s) "Federal Government Gazette - Results of Contested Election and Statements of the Poll after the Official Addition of Votes Sarawak [P.U. (B) 245/2011]" (PDF). Attorney General's Chambers of Malaysia. 29 April 2011.

Sarawak state election, 2006: Pelagus
Party	Candidate	Votes	%	∆%
BN	Larry Soon @ Larry Sng Wei Shien	5,965	64.61	▼12.16
Independent	Jeffery Nuing Ebom	2,726	29.53	▲19.07
SNAP	Simon Sibat	541	5.86	▲5.86
Total valid votes		9,232	100.00	
Total rejected ballots		125		
Unreturned ballots		44		
Turnout		9,401	67.64	
Registered electors		13,898		
Majority		3,239	35.08	
BN hold		Swing		{{{2}}}

Sarawak state election, 2001: Pelagus
Party	Candidate	Votes	%	∆%
BN	Larry Soon @ Larry Sng Wei Shien	7,418	76.77	▲76.77
Independent	Ling Kok Hong	1,155	11.95	▲11.95
Independent	Jeffery Nuing Ebom	1,011	10.46	▲10.46
Independent	Chua Bee Hun	40	0.41	▲0.41
Independent	Lee Hun Tak	39	0.40	▲0.40
Total valid votes		9,663	100.00	
Total rejected ballots		105		
Unreturned ballots		18		
Turnout		9,786	73.00	
Registered electors		13,406		
Majority		6,263	64.82	
BN hold		Swing		{{{2}}}

Sarawak state election, 1996: Pelagus
Party	Candidate	Votes	%	∆%
On the nomination day, Sng Chee Hua won uncontested.
BN	Sng Chee Hua			
Total valid votes			100.00	
Total rejected ballots				
Unreturned ballots				
Turnout				
Registered electors		12,937		
Majority				
BN gain from PBDS		Swing		?

Sarawak state election, 1991: Pelagus
Party	Candidate	Votes	%	∆%
PBDS	Sng Chee Hua	4,342	53.99	▲17.69
BN	Alexander Nanta Linggi	3,700	46.01	▲10.04
Total valid votes		8,042	100.00	
Total rejected ballots		116		
Unreturned ballots		7		
Turnout		8,165	80.54	
Registered electors		10,138		
Majority		642	7.98	
PBDS hold		Swing		{{{2}}}

Sarawak state election, 1987: Pelagus
Party	Candidate	Votes	%	∆%
PBDS	Philimon Nuing	2,242	36.22	▲36.22
BN	Kenneth Kanyan Temenggong Koh	2,226	35.96	▲35.96
Independent	Sng Chee Hua	1,289	20.82	▲20.82
Independent	Jangi Peng Jemut	433	7.00	▲7.00
Total valid votes		6,190	100.00	
Total rejected ballots		99		
Unreturned ballots		0		
Turnout		6,289	76.07	
Registered electors		8,267		
Majority		16	0.26	
PBDS gain from SNAP		Swing		?

Sarawak state election, 1983: Pelagus
Party	Candidate	Votes	%	∆%
SNAP	Nueng Kudi	2,567	51.16	▲51.16
PBDS	Jonathan Sabai Ajing	1,998	39.82	▲39.82
Independent	Lawrence Baling	453	9.03	▲9.03
Total valid votes		5,018	100.00	
Total rejected ballots		143		
Unreturned ballots		0		
Turnout		5,161	67.83	
Registered electors		7,609		
Majority		569	11.34	
SNAP gain from BN		Swing		?

Sarawak state election, 1979: Pelagus
Party	Candidate	Votes	%	∆%
BN	Jonathan Sabai Ajing	2,863	64.91	▲16.17
DAP	Kumbong P. Gerinang	1,548	35.09	▲35.09
Total valid votes		4,411	100.00	
Total rejected ballots		175		
Unreturned ballots		0		
Turnout		4,586	63.18	
Registered electors		7,259		
Majority		1,315	29.82	
BN gain from SNAP		Swing		?

Sarawak state election, 1974: Pelagus
Party	Candidate	Votes	%	∆%
SNAP	Jonathan Sabai Ajing	1,974	51.26	▲28.70
BN	Leonard Linggi Jugah	1,877	48.74	▲48.74
Total valid votes		3,851	100.00	
Total rejected ballots		426		
Unreturned ballots			0	
Turnout		4,277	73.92	
Registered electors		5,786		
Majority		97	2.52	
SNAP gain from PESAKA		Swing		?

Sarawak state by-election, 8-17 July 1971: Pelagus Upon the death of incumbent, Bennet Jarrow
Party	Candidate	Votes	%	∆%
PESAKA	Leonard Linggi Jugah	1,676	48.57	▲4.81
Sarawak Alliance	Wesley Ajan Nabau	1,445	41.87	▲41.87
Independent	Mancha Empalang	171	4.96	▲4.96
SNAP	Sibat Buyong	159	4.61	▼17.95
Total valid votes		3,451	100.00	
Total rejected ballots		109		
Unreturned ballots		0		
Turnout		3,560	77.32	
Registered electors		4,604		
Majority		231	6.70	
PESAKA hold		Swing		{{{2}}}

Sarawak state election, 1969: Pelagus
Party	Candidate	Votes	%
PESAKA	Bennet Jarrow	1,389	43.76
SUPP	Jugah Lasah	1,069	33.68
SNAP	Francis Nyuak	716	22.56
Total valid votes		3,174	100.00
Total rejected ballots		241	
Unreturned ballots		0	
Turnout		3,415	74.17
Registered electors		4,604	
Majority		320	10.08
This was a new constituency created.
