= Katibas =

State constituency in Sarawak, Malaysia

Katibas (N62)
Sarawak constituency

State constituency
- Legislature: Sarawak State Legislative Assembly
MLA
Vacant
- Constituency created: 1977
- First contested: 1979
- Last contested: 2026

Katibas is a state constituency in Sarawak, Malaysia, that has been represented in the Sarawak State Legislative Assembly since 1979.

The state constituency was created in the 1977 redistribution and is mandated to return a single member to the Sarawak State Legislative Assembly under the first past the post voting system.

== Demographics ==
Ethnic breakdown of Katibas's electorate as of 2022
1. Sarawak bumiputera (91.6%)
2. Chinese (4.80%)
3. Malay-Muslim bumiputera (3.10%)
4. Other ethnicities (0.50%)

== History ==
As of 2020, Katibas has a population of 9,534 people.

=== Polling districts ===
According to the gazette issued on 31 October 2022, the Katibas constituency has a total of 7 polling districts.

State constituency	Polling Districts	Code	Location
Katibas (N62)	Manap	215/62/01	RH Buni Sg. Lajan; RH Edward, Ng. Lajan Sg. Lijau; RH Darlin Sg. Lijau; RH Timothy Ason (Rh Jureng) Manap Batu; RH Muni @ Rua Lepong Aur; RH Tanang (Rh Balan) Ng. Embuau; RH Ngitar Lubok Rerong; RH Sugai Ng Sebetong Sg. Song
Katibas (N62)	Temelat	215/62/02	RH Kennedy, Ng Bekakap. Ulu Sg Iran; RH Runi, Ng, Selepong, Ulu Sg. Iran; SK Ng. Dalai Sg. Iran; RH Musin Ng Wai Sg. Iran; RH Gawan Ng Sebirah Sg. Iran; RH Chirry Ng Setindok Emperan Munti Sg. Iran; RH Jamba Ng. Santu Sg. Iran; SK Temalat; RH Nobert. Sesawa Batang Rajang; RH Sering, Ng Temiang, Batang Rajang; RIH Austin Ekau Ng Sipan Batang; SK Ng. Benguang
Katibas (N62)	Song	215/62/03	SJK (C) Hin Hua Song; Madrasah Kpg Gelam
Katibas (N62)	Katibas	215/62/04	RH Joslee Ng. Matalau; RH Demang Emperan Menuang Sg. Musah; RH Baro Ng. Semulong Sg. Musah; RH Japok Ng Senyaru Musah; RH Gelana Ng Tekalit; RH Jala Ng Miaw Katibas Hilir; RH Serit Ng. Setapang Sg. Takan; RH Zachius Nyalu, Ng Takan, Katibas; RH Cecelia Bunsu Ng, Kebiew; RH Wil Ng. Nyimoh; RH Delok Sg. Engkabau
Katibas (N62)	Tapang	215/62/05	RH Api Ng. Terusa; SK Lubok Ipoh; RH Sebun Ng. Masak; RH Gendang Karangan Rangkang; RH Nugu Ng. Sesibau; RII Jinggong Ng. Anchau
Katibas (N62)	Bangkit	215/62/06	RH Kana, Kerangan Panjang, Ulu Sg. Bangkit; RH Akang, Batu Pikul, Sg Bangkit; RH Lauang, Sg Ayat, Ulu Bangkit; RIH Lasin Rantau Abau Sg. Bangkit; RH Badag Ng Meluan Sg. Bangkit; SK Ng. Bangkit; RH Ribut Ng. Serau; RH Dagom Ng Makot; RH Bangau Ng Entuat; RH ljau Ng. Mukeh
Katibas (N62)	Tekalit	215/62/07	RH Gilbert Nyandang Ng. Sepunggok Tekali; RH Melayu Ng. Latong Tekalit; RH Sibat Ulu Sg. Janan Tekalit; SK Ng. Janan Tekalit; RH Changai Ng. Tenggangai Tekalit; RH Endah Ng Sepayang Sg Tekalit; SK Ng. Nansang Tekalit; RH Barain, Ng. Sebungkang, Sg Tekalit

=== Representation history ===
Members of the Legislative Assembly for Katibas
Assembly	No	Years	Member	Party
Constituency created from Song
10th	N37	1979-1983	Ambrose Blikau Enturan	BN (PBB)
11th	N37	1983-1987	Ambrose Blikau Enturan	BN (PBB)
12th	N37	1987-1991	Felix Bantin Jibom	PBDS
13th	N46	1991-1996	Ambrose Blikau Enturan	BN (PBB)
14th	N49	1996-2001	Ambrose Blikau Enturan	BN (PBB)
15th	N49	2001-2006	Ambrose Blikau Enturan	BN (PBB)
16th	N55	2006-2011	Ambrose Blikau Enturan	BN (PBB)
17th	N55	2011-2016	Ambrose Blikau Enturan	BN (PBB)
18th	N62	2016-2018	Ambrose Blikau Enturan	BN (PBB)
18th	N62	2018-2021	Ambrose Blikau Enturan	GPS (PBB)
19th	N62	2021–2026	Lidam Assan	GPS (PBB)

== Election results ==
Sarawak state election, 2026: Katibas
Party	Candidate	Votes	%	∆%
GPS				▲
PH				▲
Total valid votes				
Total rejected ballots				
Unreturned ballots				
Turnout				
Registered electors				
Majority				

Sarawak state election, 2021: Katibas
Party	Candidate	Votes	%	∆%
GPS	Lidam Assan	4,198	64.62	▲64.62
PSB	Robertson Mawa	1,201	18.49	▲18.49
PKR	Munan Laja	763	11.75	▲11.75
PBK	Yunus Basri	149	2.29	▲2.29
Independent	Tengku Geruna	123	1.89	▲1.89
PBDS Baru	Sai Malaka	62	0.95	▲0.95
Total valid votes		6,496	100.00	
Total rejected ballots		109		
Unreturned ballots		24		
Turnout		6,629	62.95	▼3.82
Registered electors		10,530		
Majority		2,997	46.13	▼2.26
GPS gain		Swing		
Source(s) https://lom.agc.gov.my/ilims/upload/portal/akta/outputp/1718688/PUB687.pdf

Sarawak state election, 2016: Katibas
Party	Candidate	Votes	%	∆%
BN	Ambrose Blikau Enturan	4,681	74.20	▲11.36
DAP	Paren Nyawi	1,628	25.80	▲25.80
Total valid votes		6,309	100.00	
Total rejected ballots		131		
Unreturned ballots		14		
Turnout		6,454	66.77	▲3.59
Registered electors		9,666		
Majority		3,053	48.40	▲5.78
BN hold		Swing		
Source(s) "Federal Government Gazette - Notice of Contested Election, State Legislative Assembly of the State of Sarawak [P.U. (B) 190/2016]" (PDF). Attorney General's Chambers of Malaysia. 25 April 2016. Archived from the original (PDF) on 2017-06-12. "Senarai Calon yang Disahkan Layak Bertanding Pilihan Raya Dewan Undangan Negeri ke-11". Election Commission of Malaysia. 25 April 2016. Archived from the original on 25 April 2016.

Sarawak state election, 2011: Katibas
Party	Candidate	Votes	%	∆%
BN	Ambrose Blikau Enturan	3,326	62.84	▼16.94
PKR	Munan Laja	1,070	20.22	▲20.22
SNAP	Toh Heng San	897	16.94	▲5.55
Total valid votes		5,293	100.00	
Total rejected ballots		85		
Unreturned ballots		19		
Turnout		5,397	63.18	▲2.17
Registered electors		8,542		
Majority		2,256	42.62	▼25.77
BN hold		Swing		
Source(s) "Federal Government Gazette - Results of Contested Election and Statements of the Poll after the Official Addition of Votes Sarawak [P.U. (B) 245/2011]" (PDF). Attorney General's Chambers of Malaysia. 29 April 2011.

Sarawak state election, 2006: Katibas
Party	Candidate	Votes	%	∆%
BN	Ambrose Blikau Enturan	3,887	79.78	▲16.34
SNAP	Abd Halim Abdullah	555	11.39	▲11.39
Independent	Stephen Ayot Kali	430	8.83	▲8.83
Total valid votes		4,872	100.00	
Total rejected ballots		97		
Unreturned ballots		1		
Turnout		4,970	61.01	
Registered electors		8,146		
Majority		3,332	68.39	▲39.34
BN hold		Swing		

Sarawak state election, 2001: Katibas
Party	Candidate	Votes	%	∆%
On the nomination day, Ambrose Blikau Enturan won uncontested.
BN	Ambrose Blikau Enturan			
Total valid votes			100.00	
Total rejected ballots				
Unreturned ballots				
Turnout				
Registered electors		8,481		
Majority				
BN hold		Swing		

Sarawak state election, 1996: Katibas
Party	Candidate	Votes	%	∆%
On the nomination day, Ambrose Blikau Enturan won uncontested.
BN	Ambrose Blikau Enturan			
Total valid votes			100.00	
Total rejected ballots				
Unreturned ballots				
Turnout				
Registered electors		8,363		
Majority				
BN hold		Swing		

Sarawak state election, 1991: Katibas
Party	Candidate	Votes	%	∆%
BN	Ambrose Blikau Enturan	3,638	63.44	▲20.49
PBDS	Felix Bantin Jibom	1,972	34.39	▼19.79
NEGARA	James Minggu Serang @ Jembu	125	2.18	▲2.18
Total valid votes		5,735	100.00	
Total rejected ballots		75		
Unreturned ballots		17		
Turnout		5,827	75.52	▲6.53
Registered electors		7,716		
Majority		1,666	29.05	▲17.82
BN gain		Swing		

Sarawak state election, 1987: Katibas
Party	Candidate	Votes	%	∆%
PBDS	Felix Bantin Jibom	2,624	54.18	▲54.18
BN	Ambrose Blikau Enturan	2,080	42.95	▼5.29
Independent	Kuin Kedal	139	2.87	▲2.87
Total valid votes		4,843	100.00	
Total rejected ballots		137		
Unreturned ballots		0		
Turnout		4,980	68.99	▲4.47
Registered electors		7,217		
Majority		544	11.23	▼0.39
PBDS gain		Swing		

Sarawak state election, 1983: Katibas
Party	Candidate	Votes	%	∆%
BN	Ambrose Blikau Enturan	2,155	48.24	▼17.16
Independent	Baleng Jingin	1,636	36.62	▲36.62
Independent	Toh Tze Hua	460	10.30	▲10.30
Independent	Tawai Lalang	216	4.84	▲4.84
Total valid votes		4,467	100.00	
Total rejected ballots		141		
Unreturned ballots		0		
Turnout		4,608	64.52	▲13.23
Registered electors		7,142		
Majority		519	11.62	▼19.18
BN hold		Swing		

Sarawak state election, 1979: Katibas
Party	Candidate	Votes	%
BN	Ambrose Blikau Enturan	2,115	65.40
Independent	Gera Jugah Bullek	1,119	34.60
Total valid votes		3,234	100.00
Total rejected ballots		195	
Unreturned ballots		0	
Turnout		3,429	51.29
Registered electors		6,686	
Majority		996	30.80
This was a new constituency created.
