= Semera (state constituency) =

Sarawak constituency

Defunct state constituency
- Legislature: Sarawak State Legislative Assembly
- Constituency created: 1968
- Constituency abolished: 1996
- First contested: 1969
- Last contested: 1991

Semera was a state constituency in Sarawak, Malaysia, that was represented in the Sarawak State Legislative Assembly from 1969 to 1996.

The state constituency was created in the 1968 redistribution and was mandated to return a single member to the Sarawak State Legislative Assembly under the first past the post voting system.

== History ==
It was abolished in 1996 after it was redistributed.

=== Representation history ===
Members of the Legislative Assembly for Semera
Assembly	No	Years	Member	Party
Constituency created
8th	N16	1970-1973	Mohammed Puteh @ Lee Thiam Kee (李天期)	BUMIPUTERA
8th	N16	1973-1974	Mohammed Puteh @ Lee Thiam Kee (李天期)	BN (PBB)
9th	N16	1974-1979	Mohammed Puteh @ Lee Thiam Kee (李天期)	BN (PBB)
10th	N16	1979-1983	Abang Ahmad Urai	BN (PBB)
11th	N16	1983-1987	Wan Abdul Wahab Wan Sanusi	BN (PBB)
12th	N16	1987-1991	Wan Abdul Wahab Wan Sanusi	BN (PBB)
13th	N16	1991-1996	Wan Abdul Wahab Wan Sanusi	BN (PBB)
Constituency abolished, renamed to Sadong Jaya

== Election results ==
Sarawak state election, 1991
Party	Candidate	Votes	%	∆%
BN	Wan Wahap @ Wan Abdul Wahab Wan Sanusi	4,050	69.78	▲13.25
PERMAS	Zamhari Zaini	1,710	29.46	▼14.01
NEGARA	Ibrahim Jeman	44	0.76	▲0.76
Total valid votes		5,804	100.00	
Total rejected ballots		64		
Unreturned ballots		4		
Turnout		5,872	74.48	▼2.18
Registered electors		7,884		
Majority		2,340	40.32	▲27.26
BN hold		Swing		

Sarawak state election, 1987
Party	Candidate	Votes	%	∆%
BN	Wan Wahap @ Wan Abdul Wahab Wan Sanusi	3,614	56.53	▲10.67
PERMAS	Wan Zainal Abidin Wan Senusi	2,779	43.47	▲43.47
Total valid votes		6,393	100.00	
Total rejected ballots		87		
Unreturned ballots		0		
Turnout		6,480	76.66	▲7.00
Registered electors		8,453		
Majority		835	13.06	▼1.76
BN hold		Swing		

Sarawak state election, 1983
Party	Candidate	Votes	%	∆%
BN	Wan Wahap @ Wan Abdul Wahab Wan Sanusi	2,462	45.86	▼25.99
Independent	Wan Alkap Tuanku Esim	1,666	31.03	▲31.03
Independent	Tan Guek Liang	1,198	22.31	▲22.31
Independent	Salleh Zen	43	0.80	▲0.80
Total valid votes		5,369	100.00	
Total rejected ballots		127		
Unreturned ballots		0		
Turnout		5,496	69.66	▼10.74
Registered electors		7,890		
Majority		796	14.83	▼28.87
BN hold		Swing		

Sarawak state election, 1979
Party	Candidate	Votes	%	∆%
BN	Abang Ahmad Urai	4,173	71.85	▲3.75
Parti Anak Jati Sarawak	Ambi Nen	1,635	28.15	▲28.15
Total valid votes		5,808	100.00	
Total rejected ballots		78		
Unreturned ballots		0		
Turnout		5,886	80.40	▼2.18
Registered electors		7,321		
Majority		2,538	43.70	▲7.49
BN hold		Swing		

Sarawak state election, 1974
Party	Candidate	Votes	%	∆%
BN	Mohammed Puteh @ Lee Thiam Kee	3,337	64.32	
SNAP	Wan Aikap Tuanku Esin	1,774	30.13	
Total valid votes		4,900	100.00	
Total rejected ballots		542		
Unreturned ballots		0		
Turnout		5,442	82.58	▼5.55
Registered electors		6,590		
Majority		1,774	36.20	▼2.15
BN gain from PBB		Swing		?

Sarawak state election, 1969
Party	Candidate	Votes	%
PBB	Mohammed Puteh @ Lee Thiam Kee	3,092	64.03
SNAP	Wan Aikap Tuanku Esin	1,240	25.68
SUPP	Salleh Zen	497	10.29
Total valid votes		4,829	100.00
Total rejected ballots		385	
Unreturned ballots		0	
Turnout		5,214	88.13
Registered electors		5,916	
Majority		1,852	38.35
This was a new constituency created.
