= Seduan =

Sarawak constituency

Defunct state constituency
- Legislature: Sarawak State Legislative Assembly
- Constituency created: 1977
- Constituency abolished: 1996
- First contested: 1969
- Last contested: 1991

Seduan was a state constituency in Sarawak, Malaysia, that was represented in the Sarawak State Legislative Assembly from 1969 to 1996.

The state constituency was created in the 1977 redistribution and was mandated to return a single member to the Sarawak State Legislative Assembly under the first past the post voting system.

== History ==
It was abolished in 1996 after it was redistributed.

=== Representation history ===
Members of the Legislative Assembly for Seduan
Assembly	No	Years	Member	Party
Constituency created
10th	N28	1979-1983	Ting Ing Mieng (丁永勉)	BN (SUPP)
11th	N28	1983-1987	Ting Ing Mieng (丁永勉)	BN (SUPP)
12th	N28	1987-1991	Ting Ing Mieng (丁永勉)	BN (SUPP)
13th	N40	1991-1996	Ting Ing Mieng (丁永勉)	BN (SUPP)
Constituency abolished, split to Nangka and Pelawan

== Election results ==
Sarawak state election, 1991: Seduan
Party	Candidate	Votes	%	∆%
BN	Ting Ing Mieng	8,677	73.21	▲4.31
DAP	Ma Teck Kiong	2,765	23.33	▲0.46
NEGARA	Junit Yunus	410	3.46	▲3.46
Total valid votes		11,852	100.00	
Total rejected ballots		264		
Unreturned ballots		650		
Turnout		12,766	68.50	▼1.64
Registered electors		18,637		
Majority		5,912	49.88	▲3.85
BN hold		Swing		

Sarawak state election, 1987: Seduan
Party	Candidate	Votes	%	∆%
BN	Ting Ing Mieng	7,023	68.90	▼9.40
DAP	Ling Sii Kiong	2,331	22.87	▲22.87
PERMAS	Eric Lee Hie Kui	684	6.71	▲6.71
Independent	Loh Ngie Hock	155	1.52	▼0.33
Total valid votes		10,193	100.00	
Total rejected ballots		66		
Unreturned ballots		0		
Turnout		10,259	70.14	▼3.83
Registered electors		14,626		
Majority		4,692	46.03	▼12.42
BN hold		Swing		

Sarawak state election, 1983: Seduan
Party	Candidate	Votes	%	∆%
BN	Ting Ing Mieng	7,445	78.30	▲19.58
Independent	Johnny Wong Sie Lee	1,887	19.85	▲17.54
Independent	Mohd Syaiffuddin Suyong Abdullah	176	1.85	▼0.45
Total valid votes		9,508	100.00	
Total rejected ballots		74		
Unreturned ballots		0		
Turnout		9,582	73.98	▲2.12
Registered electors		12,953		
Majority		5,558	58.46	▲38.72
BN hold		Swing		

Sarawak state election, 1979: Seduan
Party	Candidate	Votes	%
BN	Ting Ing Mieng	4,873	58.72
DAP	Sia Chiew King	3,235	38.98
Independent	Abang Latip bin Abdul Haron	191	2.30
Total valid votes		8,299	100.00
Total rejected ballots		69	
Unreturned ballots		0	
Turnout		8,368	71.85
Registered electors		11,646	
Majority		1,638	19.74
This was a new constituency created.
