= Gedong =

State constituency in Sarawak, Malaysia

Gedong (N26)
Sarawak constituency

State constituency
- Legislature: Sarawak State Legislative Assembly
MLA
Vacant
- Constituency created: 1968
- First contested: 1969
- Last contested: 2026

Gedong is a state constituency in Sarawak, Malaysia, that has been represented in the Sarawak State Legislative Assembly from 1969 to 1991, from 2016 to present.

The state constituency was created in the 1968 redistribution and is mandated to return a single member to the Sarawak State Legislative Assembly under the first past the post voting system.

== Demographics ==
Ethnic breakdown of Gedong's electorate as of 2022
1. Malay-Muslim bumiputera (61.0%)
2. Sarawak bumiputera (37.1%)
3. Chinese (1.20%)
4. Other ethnicities (0.70%)

== History ==
It was abolished in 1991 after it was redistributed. It was re-created in 2015.

As of 2020, Gedong has a population of 10,447 people.

=== Polling districts ===
According to the gazette issued on 31 October 2022, the Gedong constituency has a total of 7 polling districts.

State constituency	Polling Districts	Code	Location
Gedong (N26)	Kepayang	200/26/01	SK Kpg. Kepayang
Gedong (N26)	Engsengai	200/26/02	Dewan Pembangunan Insan Kpg. Engsengai Melayu Simunjan
Gedong (N26)	Sateman	200/26/03	Balai Raya Kpg. Sabang; Dewan Kpg. Sateman; SK Sg. Ba; Balai Raya Kpg. Samsu
Gedong (N26)	Pangkor	200/26/04	SK Lubok Punggor; SK Lubok Buntin; SK Kpg. Gumpey; Dewan Kampung Spaoh Gedong; Dewan Kpg. Benat Ulu
Gedong (N26)	Gedong	200/26/05	SK Abang Kadir Gedong
Gedong (N26)	Tegelam	200/26/06	SK Tegelam; Balai Raya Sg. Alit
Gedong (N26)	Keniong	200/26/07	RH Samau Ak Jelioh Munggu Air; SK Munghu Lalang; SK Kenoing; Dewan Isu Jaya; SK Semalatong

=== Representation history ===
Members of the Legislative Assembly for Gedong
Assembly	No	Years	Member	Party
Constituency created
8th	N14	1970-1973	Abang Abdul Rahim Abang Moasili	BUMIPUTERA
8th	N14	1973-1974	Abang Abdul Rahim Abang Moasili	BN (PBB)
9th	N14	1974-1979	Mohammad Tawan Abdullah @ Hilary Tawan Masan	BN (PBB)
10th	N14	1979–1983	Mohammad Tawan Abdullah @ Hilary Tawan Masan	BN (PBB)
11th	N14	1983–1987	Mohammad Tawan Abdullah @ Hilary Tawan Masan	BN (PBB)
12th	N14	1987-1991	Mohammad Tawan Abdullah @ Hilary Tawan Masan	PERMAS
Constituency abolished, split into Semera and Simunjan
Constituency re-created from Simunjan and Balai Ringin
18th	N26	2016–2018	Mohd. Naroden Majais	BN (PBB)
18th	N26	2018–2021	Mohd. Naroden Majais	GPS (PBB)
19th	N26	2021–2026	Abang Abdul Rahman Zohari Abang Openg	GPS (PBB)

== Election results ==
Sarawak state election, 2026: Gedong
Party	Candidate	Votes	%	∆%
GPS				▲
PH				▲
Total valid votes				
Total rejected ballots				
Unreturned ballots				
Turnout				
Registered electors				
Majority				

Sarawak state election, 2021: Gedong
Party	Candidate	Votes	%	∆%
GPS	Abang Abdul Rahman Zohari Abang Openg	4,310	81.88	▲81.88
PSB	Mohamad Sofian Fariz Sharbin	730	13.87	▲13.87
PBK	Tomson Ango	157	2.98	▲2.98
Amanah	Kamal Bujang	94	1.79	▼11.76
Total valid votes		5,264	100.00	
Total rejected ballots		54		
Unreturned ballots		27		
Turnout		5,345	74.15	▼0.59
Registered electors		7,208		
Majority		3,580	67.99	▲2.78
GPS gain from BN		Swing		?
Source(s) https://lom.agc.gov.my/ilims/upload/portal/akta/outputp/1718688/PUB687.pdf

Sarawak state election, 2016: Gedong
Party	Candidate	Votes	%
BN	Mohd. Naroden Majais	4,064	78.77
Amanah	Rapelson Richard Hamit	699	13.55
Independent	Uja Bansi	396	7.68
Total valid votes		5,159	100.00
Total rejected ballots		112	
Unreturned ballots		26	
Turnout		5,297	74.74
Registered electors		7,087	
Majority		3,365	65.23
This was a new constituency created.
Source(s) "Federal Government Gazette - Notice of Contested Election, State Legislative Assembly of the State of Sarawak [P.U. (B) 190/2016]" (PDF). Attorney General's Chambers of Malaysia. 25 April 2016. Archived from the original (PDF) on 2017-06-12. "Senarai Calon yang Disahkan Layak Bertanding Pilihan Raya Dewan Undangan Negeri ke-11". Election Commission of Malaysia. 25 April 2016. Archived from the original on 25 April 2016.

Sarawak state election, 1987: Gedong
Party	Candidate	Votes	%	∆%
PERMAS	Mohammad Tawan Abdullah @ Hilary Tawan Masan	3,482	59.79	▲1.52
BN	Khaider Zaidell	2,342	40.21	▼18.06
Total valid votes		5,824	100.00	
Total rejected ballots		36		
Unreturned ballots		0		
Turnout		5,860	78.65	▲9.98
Registered electors		7,451		
Majority		1,140	19.57	▼12.32
PERMAS gain from BN		Swing		?

Sarawak state election, 1983: Gedong
Party	Candidate	Votes	%	∆%
BN	Mohammad Tawan Abdullah @ Hilary Tawan Masan	2,675	58.27	▼4.76
Independent	Jaraie Drahman	1,211	26.38	▲7.39
Independent	Bujang Brahim	297	6.47	▲6.47
Independent	Mathew Ain Numan	205	4.47	▲4.47
Independent	Junaidi Solhassan	203	4.42	▲4.42
Total valid votes		4,591	100.00	
Total rejected ballots		81		
Unreturned ballots		0		
Turnout		4,672	68.62	▼6.19
Registered electors		6,809		
Majority		1,464	31.89	▼12.17
BN hold		Swing		

Sarawak state election, 1979: Gedong
Party	Candidate	Votes	%	∆%
BN	Mohammad Tawan Abdullah @ Hilary Tawan Masan	3,067	63.03	▲12.74
Independent	James Jenta	924	18.99	▲18.99
Parti Anak Jati Sarawak	Bujang Amin	738	15.17	▲15.17
Independent	Bong Janting	137	2.82	▲2.82
Total valid votes		4,866	100.00	
Total rejected ballots		90		
Unreturned ballots		0		
Turnout		4,956	74.90	▼6.19
Registered electors		6,617		
Majority		2,143	44.04	▲43.47
BN hold		Swing		

Sarawak state election, 1974: Gedong
Party	Candidate	Votes	%	∆%
BN	Mohammad Tawan Abdullah @ Hilary Tawan Masan	2,450	50.29	▲11.47
SNAP	Liew Ming Chung	2,422	49.71	▲13.32
Total valid votes		4,872	100.00	
Total rejected ballots		428		
Unreturned ballots		0		
Turnout		5,300	81.09	▼4.75
Registered electors		6,536		
Majority		28	0.57	▼1.86
BN gain from PBB		Swing		?

Sarawak state election, 1969: Gedong
Party	Candidate	Votes	%
PBB	Abang Abdul Rahim Abang Moasili	1,757	38.82
SNAP	Liew Ming Chung	1,647	36.39
PESAKA	Andrew Jika Landau	600	13.26
SUPP	Entri Tusan	522	11.53
Total valid votes		4,526	100.00
Total rejected ballots		313	
Unreturned ballots		0	
Turnout		4,839	85.84
Registered electors		5,637	
Majority		110	2.43
This was a new constituency created.
