= Limbang (state constituency) =

Sarawak constituency

Defunct state constituency
- Legislature: Sarawak State Legislative Assembly
- Constituency created: 1968
- Constituency abolished: 2006
- First contested: 1969
- Last contested: 2001

Limbang was a state constituency in Sarawak, Malaysia, that was represented in the Sarawak State Legislative Assembly from 1969 to 2006.

The state constituency was created in the 1968 redistribution and was mandated to return a single member to the Sarawak State Legislative Assembly under the first past the post voting system.

== History ==
It was abolished in 2006 after it was redistributed.

=== Representation history ===
Members of the Legislative Assembly for Limbang
Assembly	No	Years	Member	Party
Constituency created
8th	N47	1970-1974	James Wong Kim Min (黃金明)	SNAP
9th	N47	1974-1979	James Wong Kim Min (黃金明)	SNAP
10th	N47	1979-1983	James Wong Kim Min (黃金明)	BN (SNAP)
11th	N47	1983-1987	James Wong Kim Min (黃金明)	SNAP
12th	N47	1987-1991	James Wong Kim Min (黃金明)	BN (SNAP)
13th	N55	1991-1996	James Wong Kim Min (黃金明)	BN (SNAP)
14th	N60	1996-2001	James Wong Kim Min (黃金明)	BN (SNAP)
15th	N60	2001-2006	Richard Wong Shoon Fook (黃順福)	BN (SNAP)
Constituency abolished, renamed to Bukit Kota

== Election results ==
Sarawak state election, 2001
Party	Candidate	Votes	%	∆%
BN	Richard Wong Shoon Fook	5,668	52.02	
Independent	Said Mohidin	5,109	46.89	
PKR	Amran @ Hamdan Maidin	118	1.08	
Total valid votes		10,895	100.00	
Total rejected ballots		86		
Unreturned ballots		113		
Turnout		11,094	65.63	▲65.63
Registered electors		16,904		
Majority		559	5.13	▲5.13
BN hold		Swing		

Sarawak state election, 1996
Party	Candidate	Votes	%	∆%
On the nomination day, James Wong Kim Min won uncontested.
BN	James Wong Kim Min			
Total valid votes			100.00	
Total rejected ballots				
Unreturned ballots				
Turnout				
Registered electors		15,704		
Majority				
BN hold		Swing		

Sarawak state election, 1991
Party	Candidate	Votes	%	∆%
BN	James Wong Kim Min	5,813	52.99	▲2.84
PBDS	Edward Guatee Sundai	2,819	25.70	▲25.70
PERMAS	Munir Karim	2,160	19.69	▼26.20
DAP	Kong Sieng Kee	179	1.63	▲1.63
Total valid votes		10,971	100.00	
Total rejected ballots		114		
Unreturned ballots		53		
Turnout		11,138	69.57	▲2.51
Registered electors		16,009		
Majority		2,994	27.29	▲23.03
BN hold		Swing		

Sarawak state election, 1987
Party	Candidate	Votes	%	∆%
BN	James Wong Kim Min	4,555	50.15	▲9.25
PERMAS	Munir Karim	4,168	45.89	▲45.89
Independent	Thianeng Chuanteck	271	2.98	▲1.76
Independent	Ali Abdullah	89	0.98	▼0.25
Total valid votes		9,083	100.00	
Total rejected ballots		130		
Unreturned ballots		0		
Turnout		9,213	67.06	▼7.19
Registered electors		13,738		
Majority		387	4.26	▼1.20
BN gain from SNAP		Swing		?

Sarawak state election, 1983
Party	Candidate	Votes	%	∆%
SNAP	James Wong Kim Min	3,399	40.90	▼32.63
Independent	Mohamed Abu Bakar	2,945	35.43	▲28.96
Parti Bangsa Dayak Sarawak	Christopher Sawan Jiram	1,865	22.44	▲22.44
Independent	Ang Ek Meng	102	1.23	▼5.25
Total valid votes		8,311	100.00	
Total rejected ballots		103		
Unreturned ballots		0		
Turnout		8,414	74.26	▲0.15
Registered electors		11,331		
Majority		454	5.46	▼57.18
SNAP gain from BN		Swing		?

Sarawak state election, 1979
Party	Candidate	Votes	%	∆%
BN	James Wong Kim Min	5,021	73.52	▲16.00
Independent	Lim Cheong Heng	743	10.88	▲8.08
Independent	Hasbollah Majid	623	9.12	▲6.32
Independent	Francis Mabong Jeruka	442	6.47	▲3.67
Total valid votes		6,829	100.00	
Total rejected ballots		205		
Unreturned ballots		0		
Turnout		7,034	74.10	▼7.67
Registered electors		9,492		
Majority		4,278	62.64	▲44.80
BN gain from SNAP		Swing		?

Sarawak state election, 1974
Party	Candidate	Votes	%	∆%
SNAP	James Wong Kim Min	3,224	57.52	▼6.17
BN	Mustapha Besar	2,224	39.68	▲39.68
Independent	Lim Cho Seng	157	2.80	▲2.80
Total valid votes		5,605	100.00	
Total rejected ballots		310		
Unreturned ballots		0		
Turnout		5,915	81.78	▲1.93
Registered electors		7,233		
Majority		1,000	17.84	▼22.68
SNAP hold		Swing		

Sarawak state election, 1969
Party	Candidate	Votes	%
SNAP	James Wong Kim Min	2,935	63.69
PBB	Bakar Abdullah	1,068	23.18
Independent	Pugi Yabai	385	8.36
Independent	Tahir Hassan	220	4.77
Total valid votes		4,608	100.00
Total rejected ballots		330	
Unreturned ballots		0	
Turnout		4,938	79.85
Registered electors		6,184	
Majority		867	40.52
This was a new constituency created.
