= Bukit Begunan =

State constituency in Sarawak, Malaysia

Bukit Begunan (N31)
Sarawak constituency

State constituency
- Legislature: Sarawak State Legislative Assembly
MLA
Vacant
- Constituency created: 1987
- First contested: 1991
- Last contested: 20262026

Bukit Begunan is a state constituency in Sarawak, Malaysia, that has been represented in the Sarawak State Legislative Assembly since 1991.

The state constituency was created in the 1987 redistribution and is mandated to return a single member to the Sarawak State Legislative Assembly under the first past the post voting system.

== Demographics ==
Ethnic breakdown of Bukit Begunan's electorate as of 2022
1. Sarawak bumiputera (80.0%)
2. Malay-Muslim bumiputera (13.3%)
3. Chinese (6.10%)
4. Other ethnicities (0.60%)

== History ==
As of 2020, Bukit Begunan has a population of 18,672 people.

=== Polling districts ===
According to the gazette issued on 31 October 2022, the Bukit Begunan constituency has a total of 5 polling districts.

State constituency	Polling Districts	Code	Location
Bukit Begungan (N31)	Banting	202/31/01	Balai Raya Banting; SK Engkeranji Lingga; RH Edward Mamut Langgir Lingga; RH Jack Engkerepok Lingga
Bukit Begungan (N31)	Kara	202/31/02	RH Guang, Kara Pantu; RH Rekie Anak Sumpit, Kpg Punggu Tengah; RH Francis Doblin Anak Betol Selanjan Angkong; SK Selanjan Enchiap; RH Johnny Anak Gura Selanjan Enchiap; SK St Martin Lachau; RH Tanggu Kubau Ili; SJK (C) Chung Hua Bangkong
Bukit Begungan (N31)	Melugu	202/31/03	Dewan Masyarakat Gua; RH Jawan Panggil; Balai Raya RH Anyai Entulang; Kelas 2, SK Temudok Kem
Bukit Begungan (N31)	Klauh	202/31/04	RH Kedeni, Batu Besai; Balai Raya RH Beriku Pakit; SK Selepong; SMK Melugu; RH Wilson Bana, Po Ai Dau
Bukit Begungan (N31)	Bukit Balau	202/31/05	SK Bakong; RH Langau Anak Selumbang Jongkong Panjai; RH Resa Ak Gayau Empelanjau Asal Bakong; SK Tanjong Bijat

=== Representation history ===
Members of the Legislative Assembly for Bukit Begunan
Assembly	No	Years	Member	Party
Constituency created from Sri Aman and Lingga
13th	N20	1991–1996	Daniel Tajem Miri	BN (PBDS)
14th	N22	1996–2001	Mong Dagang	BN (PBDS)
15th	N22	2001–2004	Mong Dagang	BN (PBDS)
15th	N22	2004–2006	Mong Dagang	BN (PRS)
16th	N26	2006–2011	Mong Dagang	BN (PRS)
17th	N26	2011–2016	Mong Dagang	BN (PRS)
18th	N31	2016–2018	Mong Dagang	BN (PRS)
18th	N31	2018–2021	Mong Dagang	GPS (PRS)
19th	N31	2021–2026	Mong Dagang	GPS (PRS)

== Election results ==
Sarawak state election, 2026: Bukit Begunan
Party	Candidate	Votes	%	∆%
GPS				▲
PH				▲
Total valid votes				
Total rejected ballots				
Unreturned ballots				
Turnout				
Registered electors				
Majority				

Sarawak state election, 2021: Bukit Begunan
Party	Candidate	Votes	%	∆%
GPS	Mong Dagang	4,054	58.69	▲58.69
PSB	Norina Umoi Utot	2,652	38.40	▲38.40
PBDS Baru	Entusa Imam	115	1.66	▲1.66
PBK	Vinton Langang Sangga	86	1.25	▲1.25
Total valid votes		6,907	100.00	
Total rejected ballots		88		
Unreturned ballots		26		
Turnout		7,021	72.89	▲3.16
Registered electors		9,632		
Majority		1,402	20.30	▼53.00
GPS gain from BN		Swing		?
Source(s) https://lom.agc.gov.my/ilims/upload/portal/akta/outputp/1718688/PUB687.pdf

Sarawak state election, 2016: Bukit Begunan
Party	Candidate	Votes	%	∆%
BN	Mong Dagang	5,550	86.65	▲18.61
PKR	Jubri Atak	855	13.35	▼3.30
Total valid votes		6,405	100.00	
Total rejected ballots		125		
Unreturned ballots		17		
Turnout		6,547	69.73	▼0.62
Registered electors		9,389		
Majority		4,695	73.30	▲21.90
BN hold		Swing		
Source(s) "Federal Government Gazette – Notice of Contested Election, State Legislative Assembly of the State of Sarawak [P.U. (B) 190/2016]" (PDF). Attorney General's Chambers of Malaysia. 25 April 2016. Archived from the original (PDF) on 12 June 2017. "Senarai Calon yang Disahkan Layak Bertanding Pilihan Raya Dewan Undangan Negeri ke-11". Election Commission of Malaysia. 25 April 2016. Archived from the original on 25 April 2016.

Sarawak state election, 2011: Bukit Begunan
Party	Candidate	Votes	%	∆%
BN	Mong Dagang	3,671	68.04	▲8.28
PKR	Jimmy Lim @ Jimmy Donald	898	16.65	▲16.65
SNAP	Ivanhoe Anthony Belon	638	11.83	▼28.41
Independent	Lias Julai	188	3.48	▲3.48
Total valid votes		5,395	100.00	
Total rejected ballots		56		
Unreturned ballots		21		
Turnout		5,472	70.35	▲1.69
Registered electors		7,778		
Majority		2,773	51.40	▲31.88
BN hold		Swing		
Source(s) "Federal Government Gazette – Results of Contested Election and Statements of the Poll after the Official Addition of Votes Sarawak [P.U. (B) 245/2011]" (PDF). Attorney General's Chambers of Malaysia. 29 April 2011.

Sarawak state election, 2006: Bukit Begunan
Party	Candidate	Votes	%	∆%
BN	Mong Dagang	3,083	59.76	▼6.44
SNAP	Daniel Tajem Miri	2,076	40.24	▲40.24
Total valid votes		5,159	100.00	
Total rejected ballots		85		
Unreturned ballots		5		
Turnout		5,249	68.66	▲5.44
Registered electors		7,644		
Majority		1,007	19.52	▼21.25
BN hold		Swing		

Sarawak state election, 2001: Bukit Begunan
Party	Candidate	Votes	%	∆%
BN	Mong Dagang	4,669	66.20	▲1.99
STAR	Marcus Kanyong	1,793	25.42	▲25.42
Independent	Wel @ Maxwell Rojis	474	6.72	▲6.72
Independent	Lawrence Ambu	117	1.66	▲1.66
Total valid votes		7,053	100.00	
Total rejected ballots		96		
Unreturned ballots		24		
Turnout		7,173	63.22	▲1.29
Registered electors		11,346		
Majority		2,876	40.78	▼28.45
BN hold		Swing		

Sarawak state by-election, 15–16 March 1997: Bukit Begunan Upon election declared null and void
Party	Candidate	Votes	%	∆%
BN	Mong Dagang	5,640	84.62	
Independent	Jack Bujang	1,025	15.38	
Total valid votes		6,665	100.00	
Total rejected ballots		102		
Unreturned ballots		0		
Turnout		6,767	61.93	
Registered electors		10,926		
Majority		4,615	69.24	
BN hold		Swing		

Sarawak state election, 1996: Bukit Begunan
Party	Candidate	Votes	%	∆%
BN	Mong Dagang	4,891	64.21	▲17.78
Independent	Donald Lawan	2,726	35.79	▲35.79
Total valid votes		7,617	100.00	
Total rejected ballots		98		
Unreturned ballots		47		
Turnout		7,762	71.04	▼2.97
Registered electors		10,926		
Majority		2,165	28.42	▲21.28
BN gain from PBDS		Swing		?

Sarawak state election, 1991: Bukit Begunan
Party	Candidate	Votes	%
PBDS	Daniel Tajem Miri	4,004	53.57
BN	Donald Lawan	3,470	46.43
Total valid votes		7,474	100.00
Total rejected ballots		92	
Unreturned ballots		23	
Turnout		7,589	74.01
Registered electors		10,254	
Majority		534	7.14
This was a new constituency created.
