= Mong Dagang =

Malaysian politician

Yang Berhormat Datuk Mong Dagang MLA PGBK

Member of the Sarawak State Legislative Assembly for Bukit Begunan
- Incumbent
- Assumed office 1996
- Preceded by: Daniel Tajem Miri

Personal details
- Born: Mong anak Dagang Sarawak
- Citizenship: Malaysian
- Party: PBDS (till 2004); PRS (since 2004)
- Other political affiliations: Barisan Nasional (till 2018); Gabungan Parti Sarawak (since 2018)
- Occupation: Politician

Mong anak Dagang is a Malaysian politician from PRS. He has served as the Member of the Sarawak State Legislative Assembly for Bukit Begunan since 1996.

== Political career ==
Mong is a Vice President of PRS.

== Election results ==
Sarawak State Legislative Assembly
Year	Constituency	Candidate	Votes	Pct.	Opponent(s)	Votes	Pct.	Ballots cast	Majority	Turnout
1996	N22 Bukit Begunan	Mong Dagang (PBDS)	4,891	64.21%	Donald Lawan (IND)	2,726	35.79%	7,762	2,165	71.04%
1997	N22 Bukit Begunan	Mong Dagang (PBDS)	5,640	84.62%	Jack Bujang (IND)	1,025	15.38%	6,767	4,615	61.93%
2001	N22 Bukit Begunan	Mong Dagang (PBDS)	4,669	66.20%	Marcus Kanyong (STAR)	1,793	25.42%	7,173	2,876	63.22%
2001	N22 Bukit Begunan	Mong Dagang (PBDS)	4,669	66.20%	Maxwell Rojis (IND)	474	6.72%	7,173	2,876	63.22%
2001	N22 Bukit Begunan	Mong Dagang (PBDS)	4,669	66.20%	Lawrence Ambu (IND)	117	1.66%	7,173	2,876	63.22%
2006	N26 Bukit Begunan	Mong Dagang (PRS)	3,083	59.76%	Daniel Tajem Miri (SNAP)	2,076	40.24%	5,249	1,007	68.66%
2011	N26 Bukit Begunan	Mong Dagang (PRS)	3,671	68.04%	Jimmy Lim @ Jimmy Donald (PKR)	898	16.65%	5,472	2,773	70.35%
2011	N26 Bukit Begunan	Mong Dagang (PRS)	3,671	68.04%	Ivanhoe Anthony Belon (SNAP)	638	11.83%	5,472	2,773	70.35%
2011	N26 Bukit Begunan	Mong Dagang (PRS)	3,671	68.04%	Lias Julai (IND)	188	3.48%	5,472	2,773	70.35%
2016	N31 Bukit Begunan	Mong Dagang (PRS)	5,550	86.65%	Jubri Atak (PKR)	855	13.35%	6,547	4,695	69.73%
2021	N31 Bukit Begunan	Mong Dagang (PRS)	4,054	58.69%	Norina Umoi Utot (PSB)	2,652	38.40%	7,021	1,402	72.29%
2021	N31 Bukit Begunan	Mong Dagang (PRS)	4,054	58.69%	Entusa Imam (PBDS Baru)	115	1.66%	7,021	1,402	72.29%
2021	N31 Bukit Begunan	Mong Dagang (PRS)	4,054	58.69%	Vinton Langang Sangga (PBK)	86	1.25%	7,021	1,402	72.29%

== Honours ==
- Sarawak :
  - Commander of the Order of the Star of Hornbill Sarawak (PGBK) – Datuk (2011)
