= Limbang (disambiguation) =

Limbang may refer to:

- Limbang, city in Malaysia
- Limbang (federal constituency), represented in the Dewan Rakyat
- Limbang (state constituency), formerly represented in the Sarawak State Legislative Assembly (1969–2006)
