= Elections in Sarawak =

Elections for public office in Sarawak

Elections in Sarawak have been held in the Malaysian state of Sarawak since 1959 and have chosen Sarawak's elected representatives in the Dewan Rakyat and Dewan Undangan Negeri (the Malaysian federal and state assemblies).

== History ==
After Sarawak became a crown colony on 1 July 1946, Sir Charles Noble Arden-Clarke, the then governor of Sarawak issued "Notes on the Development of Local Government in Sarawak". This led to the setting up of local authorities in Sarawak, financed by population-based capitation grants, customary taxes, and license fees. By 1957, local authorities covered all areas in Sarawak. In 1959, the crown colony government decided to standardise the rates-collecting system for all local authorities in Sarawak. The amount of rates collected was based on property values and matched by one or two-dollar government grants for every dollar collected in rates. Sarawak indirect three-tiered district council elections were held in 1959 and 1963 respectively. After that, no more local government elections were held in Sarawak. On 25 June 1964, Council Negri of Sarawak (now Sarawak State Legislative Assembly) passed an amendment to the Sarawak constitution that removed the provision to hold indirect elections to the Council Negri within 60 days in all situations. The local councillor members, where three-year tenure were due to expire on 30 June 1966, were extended until six months after the dissolution of Council Negri.

Since 1970, direct elections were held where members were directly elected into the Council Negri instead of district councils.

== Federal level ==
=== Federal constituencies ===
- List of former Malaysian federal electoral districts#Sarawak
- List of Malaysian electoral districts#Sarawak

== State level ==
=== State constituencies ===
- List of former Malaysian state electoral districts#Sarawak

== By-Elections ==
=== State Assembly ===
- 2023
1. Jepak
- 2017
1. Tanjung Datu
- 2014
1. Balingian
- 2009
1. Batang Air
- 2004
1. Ba'kelalan
- 1997
1. Bukit Begunan
2. Kemena
3. Kidurong
- 1992
1. Batu Kawah
- 1986
1. Oya
- 1982
1. Batang Air
- 1981
1. Sebandi
2. Matu-Daro
3. Satok
- 1980
1. Oya
- 1979
1. Muara Tuang
2. Kuching Timor
- 1978
1. Machan
- 1977
1. Balingian
- 1976
1. Semariang
- 1974
1. Engkilili-Skrang
- 1973
1. Sebandi
2. Kuching Barat
- 1971
1. Pelagus

=== Dewan Rakyat ===
- 2010
1. Sibu
- 1987
1. Lubok Antu
- 1981
1. Paloh
- 1980
1. Mukah
- 1973
1. Rajang
- 1971
1. Bau-Lundu
