= Miri-Subis =

Former federal constituency in Malaysia

Sarawak constituency

Defunct federal constituency
- Legislature: Dewan Rakyat
- Constituency created: 1968
- Constituency abolished: 1978
- First contested: 1969
- Last contested: 1974

Miri-Subis was a federal constituency in Sarawak, Malaysia, that was represented in the Dewan Rakyat from 1971 to 1978.

The federal constituency was created in the 1968 redistribution and was mandated to return a single member to the Dewan Rakyat under the first past the post voting system.

== History ==
It was abolished in 1978 when it was redistributed.

=== Representation history ===
Members of Parliament for Miri-Subis
Parliament	No	Years	Member	Party
Constituency created
		1969-1971	Parliament was suspended	
3rd	P142	1971-1974	James Wong Kim Min (黄金明)	SNAP
4th	P152	1974-1978	Yang Siew Siang (杨寿祥)	BN (SUPP)
Constituency abolished, split into Baram and Lambir

=== State constituency ===
Parliamentary constituency	State constituency					
Parliamentary constituency	1969–1978	1978–1990	1990–1999	1999–2008	2008–2016	2016−present
Miri-Subis	Miri					
Miri-Subis	Subis					

== Election results ==
Malaysian general election, 1974: Miri-Subis
Party	Candidate	Votes	%	∆%
BN	Yang Siew Siang	8,949	54.96	▲54.96
SNAP	James Wong Kim Min	7,334	45.04	▼1.32
Total valid votes		16,283	100.00	
Total rejected ballots		822		
Unreturned ballots		0		
Turnout		17,105	71.10	▼2.57
Registered electors		24,058		
Majority		1,615	9.92	▲4.65
BN gain from SNAP		Swing		?

Malaysian general election, 1969: Miri-Subis
Party	Candidate	Votes	%
SNAP	James Wong Kim Min	4,391	46.36
SUPP	Ekoon Bantar	3,892	41.09
Independent	Guyang Nisau	1,189	12.55
Total valid votes		9,472	100.00
Total rejected ballots		3,684	
Unreturned ballots		0	
Turnout		13,156	73.67
Registered electors		17,859	
Majority		499	5.27
This was a new constituency created.
