= 1974 Sarawak state election =

Malaysian state legislative election

- 24 August 1974 – 14 September 1974

All 48 seats in the Council Negri 25 seats needed for a majority
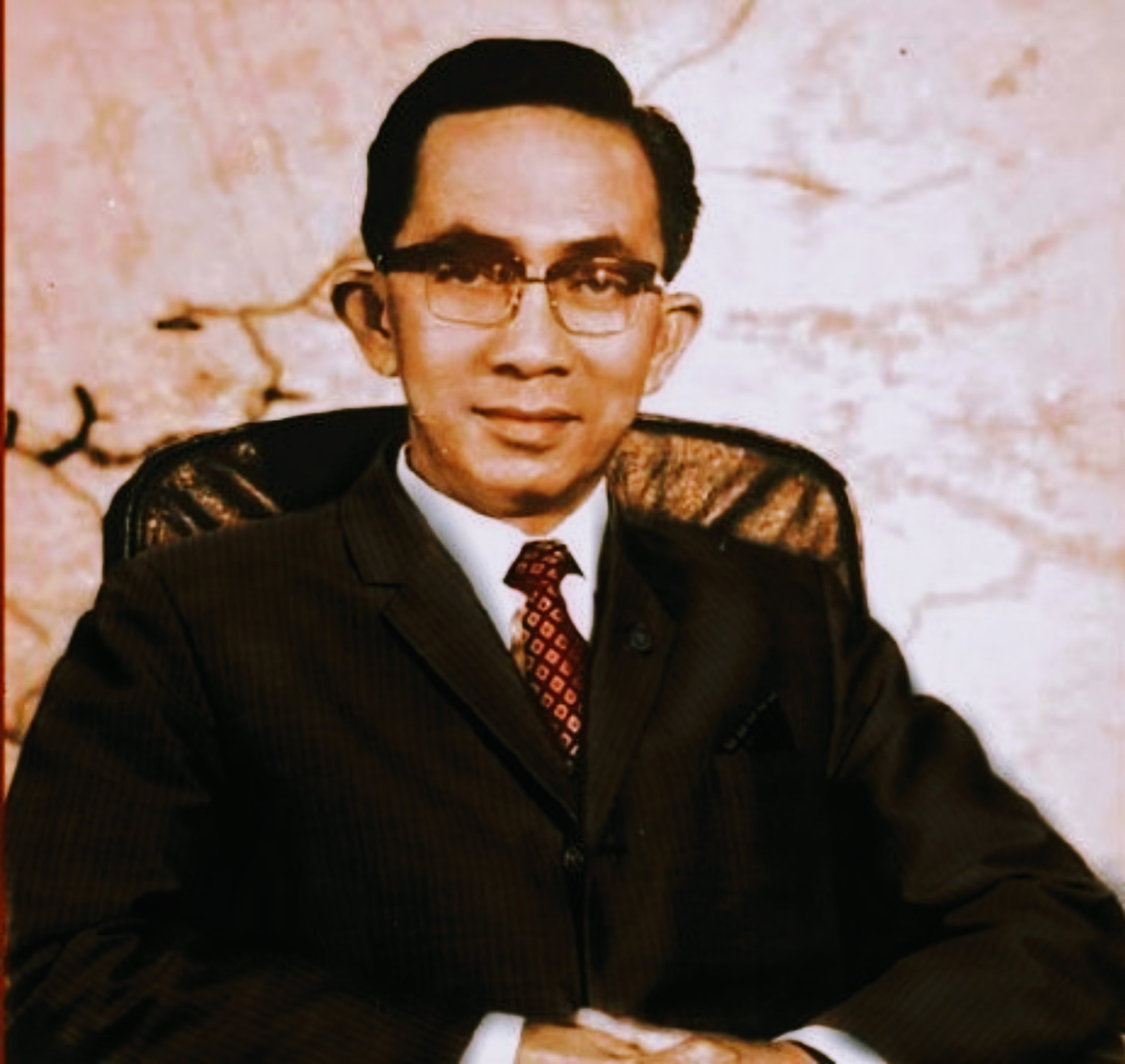

	Majority party	Minority party
Leader	Abdul Rahman Ya'kub	James Wong
Party	PBB	SNAP
Alliance	BN
Leader since	unknown	1971
Leader's seat	Kuala Rajang	Limbang
Seats before	New party	12
Seats won	30	18
Seat change	▲30	▲6
Popular vote	144,492	111,438
Percentage	55.42%	42.74%
Swing	–	–
Chief Minister before election
Abdul Rahman Ya'kub
BN-PBB
Elected Chief Minister
Abdul Rahman Ya'kub
BN-PBB

The second Sarawak state election was held between Saturday, 24 August and Saturday, 14 September 1974 which lasted for 3 weeks. The election was carried out in stages because of lack of communication and transportation systems.

This election was held simultaneously with 1974 Malaysian general election with the exception of Sabah state legislative assembly. The dissolution of the state assembly was carried out with the dissolution of state assemblies from other states and House of Representatives of Malaysian Parliament on 31 July 1974. This was the first time the election was held before 5 years tenure has finished.

A total of 48 seats were contested in this election.

This election saw 375,882 registered voters with 75.1% of the voters cast their votes.

All the 48 seats were contested by Sarawak Barisan Nasional. The coalition was consisting of United Traditional Bumiputera Party (PBB) and Sarawak United Peoples' Party (SUPP).

A total of 47 seats was contested by Sarawak National Party (SNAP) and 4 seats by BISAMAH (Refer to Results for details of contradictory information).

There were 12 independent candidates vying for the seats.

The Belaga seat was not contested by SNAP.

== Results ==
Barisan Nasional won 30 seats and the remaining 18 seats were won by SNAP.

Party or alliance		Votes	%	Seats	+/–
Barisan Nasional	Parti Pesaka Bumiputera Bersatu	89,534	34.34	18	New
Barisan Nasional	Sarawak United Peoples' Party	54,958	21.08	12	0
Barisan Nasional	Total	144,492	55.42	30	New
Sarawak National Party		111,438	42.74	18	+6
Sarawak Bisamah Party		716	0.27	0	New
Independents		4,084	1.57	0	–1
Total		260,730	100.00	48	0
Valid votes		260,730	92.31		
Invalid/blank votes		21,732	7.69		
Total votes		282,462	100.00		
Registered voters/turnout		375,882	75.15		

According to Election Commission (EC), there were four candidates who contested under BISAMAH party flag for DUN Sarawak. However, EC has contradictory information claiming Lawrence Pohan contested under BISAMAH (hence one candidate) and classifying Lawrence Pohan as Independent. According to Results of 1974 General Election in Sarawak State (Malaysian Information Services, Sarawak) (1974), following are the BISAMAH candidates - Frank Dustino Sirau (Muara Tuang), Augustine Sirau (Batu Kawah), William Nais (Bengoh) and Lawrence Pohan (Tarat).

=== Elected members ===
No.	State Constituency	Member	Party
BN 30 | SNAP 18
N01	Lundu	Chong Kim Mook	BN (SUPP)
N02	Bau	Lee Nyan Choi	SNAP
N03	Kuching Barat	Abang Abu Bakar Abang Mustapha	BN (PBB)
N04	Kuching Timor	Lo Foot Kee	SNAP
N05	Semariang	Ajibah Abol	BN (PBB)
N06	Sekama	Sim Kheng Hong	BN (SUPP)
N07	Sebandi	Abdul Rahman Hamzah	BN (PBB)
N08	Muara Tuang	Mohamad Musa	BN (PBB)
N09	Batu Kawah	Chong Kiun Kong	BN (SUPP)
N10	Bengoh	Segus anak Ginyai	BN (SUPP)
N11	Tarat	Robert Kandong	SNAP
N12	Tebakang	Michael Ben Panggi	SNAP
N13	Semera	Mohammed Puteh @ Lee Thiam Kee	BN (PBB)
N14	Gedong	Mohammad Tawan Abdullah @ Hilary Tawan Masan	BN (PBB)
N15	Lingga-Sebuyau	Daniel Tajem Miri	SNAP
N16	Simanggang	Hollis Tini	BN (SUPP)
N17	Engkilili-Skrang	Nading Lingeh	SNAP
N18	Ulu Ai	David Jemut	SNAP
N19	Saribas	Abang Ahmad Urai Abang Mohideen	BN (PBB)
N20	Layar	Alfred Jabu Numpang	BN (PBB)
N21	Kalaka	Ahmad Zaidi Adruce	BN (PBB)
N22	Krian	Dunstan Endawie Enchana	SNAP
N23	Kuala Rajang	Abdul Rahman Ya'kub	BN (PBB)
N24	Repok	Chong Siew Chiang	BN (SUPP)
N25	Matu-Daro	Awang Hipni Pengiran Anu	BN (PBB)
N26	Binatang	Anthony Teo Tiao Gin	BN (SUPP)
N27	Sibu Tengah	Chew Kim Poon	BN (SUPP)
N28	Sibu Luar	Wong Soon Kai	BN (SUPP)
N29	Igan	Ling Beng Siong	BN (SUPP)
N30	Dudong	Sandah Jarrow	SNAP
N31	Balingian	Salleh Jafaruddin	BN (PBB)
N32	Oya	Edwin Esnen Unang	BN (PBB)
N33	Pakan	Jawie Wilson Masing	SNAP
N34	Meluan	Gramong Jelian	SNAP
N35	Machan	Leo Moggie Irok	SNAP
N36	Ngemah	Lias Kana	BN (PBB)
N37	Song	Ngelambong Banggau	BN (PBB)
N38	Pelagus	Jonathan Sabai Ajing	SNAP
N39	Baleh	Peter Gani Kiai	SNAP
N40	Belaga	Nyipa Kilah @ Nyipa Bato	BN (SUPP)
N41	Tatau	Joseph Mamat Samuel	SNAP
N42	Kemena	Celestine Ujang Jilan	BN (PBB)
N43	Subis	Mumin bin Kader	BN (PBB)
N44	Miri	Chia Chin Shin	BN (SUPP)
N45	Marudi	Edward Jeli Belayong	SNAP
N46	Telang Usan	Joseph Balan Seling	SNAP
N47	Limbang	James Wong Kim Min	SNAP
N48	Lawas	Awang Daud bin Metusin	BN (PBB)

== Aftermath ==
Two years after the election, SNAP elected to join BN as component party at federal and state level. This ensured that the state assembly has no main opposition party, until the next state election.

== See also ==
- 1974 Malaysian general election
- List of Malaysian State Assembly Representatives (1974–1978)
