= Lidam Assan =

Malaysian politician

Yang Berhormat Lidam Assan MLA AMN

Member of the Sarawak State Legislative Assembly for Katibas
- Incumbent
- Assumed office 2021
- Preceded by: Ambrose Blikau Enturan

Personal details
- Born: Lidam anak Assan; 1962 (age 63–64) Sarawak
- Citizenship: Malaysian
- Party: PBB
- Other political affiliations: Gabungan Parti Sarawak
- Occupation: Politician

Lidam anak Assan is a Malaysian politician from PBB. He has served as the Member of the Sarawak State Legislative Assembly for Katibas since 2021.

== Election results ==
Sarawak State Legislative Assembly
| Year | Constituency | Candidate | Votes | Pct. | Opponent(s) | Votes | Pct. | Ballots cast | Majority | Turnout |
|---|---|---|---|---|---|---|---|---|---|---|
| 2021 | N62 Katibas | Lidam Assan (PBB) | 4,198 | 64.62% | Robertson Mawa (PSB) | 1,201 | 18.49% | 6,629 | 2,997 | 62.95% |
| 2021 | N62 Katibas | Lidam Assan (PBB) | 4,198 | 64.62% | Munan Laja (PKR) | 763 | 11.75% | 6,629 | 2,997 | 62.95% |
| 2021 | N62 Katibas | Lidam Assan (PBB) | 4,198 | 64.62% | Yunus Basri (PBK) | 149 | 2.29% | 6,629 | 2,997 | 62.95% |
| 2021 | N62 Katibas | Lidam Assan (PBB) | 4,198 | 64.62% | Tengku Geruna (IND) | 123 | 1.89% | 6,629 | 2,997 | 62.95% |
| 2021 | N62 Katibas | Lidam Assan (PBB) | 4,198 | 64.62% | Sai Malaka (PBDS Baru) | 62 | 0.95% | 6,629 | 2,997 | 62.95% |

== Honours ==
- Malaysia :
  - Member of the Order of the Defender of the Realm (AMN) (2021)
