= James Wong Kim Min =

Malaysian politician

Yang Berbahagia Datuk Amar James Wong Kim Min DA PNBS
- 黄金明

5th Leader of the Opposition
- In office 24 August 1974 – 30 October 1974
- Monarch: Abdul Halim
- Prime Minister: Abdul Razak
- Preceded by: Lim Kit Siang
- Succeeded by: Edmund Langgu Saga

Deputy Chief Minister of Sarawak
- In office 1963–1966
- Preceded by: Post created

3rd President of Sarawak National Party
- In office 1981–2003
- Preceded by: Dunstan Endawie Enchana
- Succeeded by: Edwin Dundang Bugak

Member of the Malaysian Parliament for Bintulu
- In office 1990–1995

Member of the Malaysian Parliament for Miri-Subis
- In office 1970–1974

Member of the Sarawak State Assembly for Limbang
- In office 1963–2001
- Succeeded by: Richard Wong Shoan Fook

Personal details
- Born: 6 August 1922 Limbang, Kingdom of Sarawak
- Died: 18 July 2011 (aged 88) Kuching, Sarawak
- Citizenship: Malaysian
- Party: Sarawak National Party (SNAP)
- Spouse: Valerie Bong
- Children: 5 daughters, 3 sons
- Occupation: Politician

James Wong Kim Min

Chinese name
- Traditional Chinese: 黃金明
- Simplified Chinese: 黄金明
- Hanyu Pinyin: Huáng Jīnmíng
- Pha̍k-fa-sṳ: Vòng Kîm-mìn
- Jyutping: Wong4 Gam1 Ming4
- Hokkien POJ: N̂g Kim-bêng
- Tâi-lô: N̂g Kim-bîng

James Wong Kim Min (simplified Chinese: 黄金明; traditional Chinese: 黃金明; pinyin: Huáng Jīnmíng; Jyutping: Wong4 Gam1 Ming4; Pe̍h-ōe-jī: N̂g Kim-bêng; Pha̍k-fa-sṳ: Vòng Kîm-mìn) (6 August 1922 – 18 July 2011) was a Malaysian politician active in the politics of Sarawak for decades. Wong holds the record as the longest serving assemblyman in the history of the state of Sarawak, holding the office for nearly fifty years. Wong served as the first Deputy Chief Minister of Sarawak and the president of the Sarawak National Party (SNAP). He held several other ministries of Sarawak politics until his retirement in 2001.

== Personal life ==
Wong was born in Limbang, Kingdom of Sarawak, on 6 August 1922. Sarawak was a British protectorate at the time.

== Early political career ==
He began his political career in 1951, when he was elected to the Limbang District Council.

In 1956, Wong was elected to Sarawak's legislature, the Council Negri, which is now known as the Sarawak State Legislative Assembly. He continued to hold office in the Legislative Assembly until his retirement in 2001.

Malaysia became an independent country in 1963. Wong had been a member of the Malaysian Solidarity Convention's Sarawak delegation in 1962, which negotiated the formation of the new nation. Stephen Kalong Ningkan, the then president of the Sarawak National Party (SNAP), became the first Chief Minister of Sarawak, while Wong became the state's first deputy Chief Minister.

== Member of the opposition ==
SNAP pulled out of the national coalition government, led by the Alliance Party, and became an opposition party. Wong, a member of the SNAP, won a seat in the Parliament of Malaysia in the 1969 general election, representing the Miri-Subis constituency. Wong became the leader of the Malaysian Opposition in August 1974. Wong would later be arrested under the Internal Security Act on 30 October 1974 and held at the Kamunting Detention Centre for several years. In 1981, Wong became the third president of the Sarawak National Party.

== Reconciliation with Barisan Nasional ==
Wong's Sarawak National Party reconciled and rejoined the successor of the Alliance, the Barisan Nasional. Under the new coalition, Wong became a minister in Sarawak's state cabinet, holding several portfolios during the 1980s, 1990s and early 2000s. Wong became the Environment and Tourism Minister of Sarawak from 1987 to 1994. He then became the state Minister of Environment and Housing from 1995 to 1997 and finally the state Minister of Environment and Public Health from 1998 until his retirement in 2001. In 2001, Wong, who was still serving as Environment Minister, was awarded the Langkawi Award for to work in launching a sea turtle satellite tracking program and spearheading a new reefball project for coral reefs.

== Retirement from politics ==
Wong retired from politics in 2001. He continued to author new books and poems during his retirement. Wong authored The Price of Loyalty, a book about his imprisonment at the Kamunting detention center under the Internal Security Act. By 2003, Wong had published the third edition of The Birth of Malaysia, a history of the country. He also released a third book, Memories of Speeches at the Council Negri. In addition to his books, Wong also wrote poetry during his later life. His poetry collections included A Special Breed in 1981, Shimmering Moonbeams in 1983, Buy a Little Time in 1989 and Beautiful Butterfly in 2009.

Wong also spearheaded the push to have Malaysia Day declared a national holiday. In 2010, Malaysia Day was finally declared an official holiday, to be celebrated nationwide on 16 September of every year. Wong spoke of Malaysia Day in 2010 saying, "It is my hope that Malaysia Day will be celebrated every 16 September. People should remember it because it's a historic occasion."

== Death ==
James Wong suffered a heart attack on 18 July 2011. He died shortly after 10 a.m. at the Normah Medical Specialist Centre in Kuching, Sarawak, Malaysia, at the age of 90. Wong was survived by his wife, Datin Amar Valerie Bong; five daughters; three sons; thirteen grandchildren and four great-grandchildren.

He was buried in Limbang at the family cemetery in Jalan Pandaruan. Dignitaries in attendance included members of each of Sarawak's major ethnic groups, including the Chinese, the Kedayan, Bruneian Malays, Bisaya, Tabun, Lun Bawang and Iban.

Sarawak government announced that it will put together an exhibit of Wong's documents at the state museum.

== Election results ==
Parliament of Malaysia
Year	Constituency	Candidate	Votes	Pct	Opponent(s)	Votes	Pct	Ballots cast	Majority	Turnout
1969	P142 Miri-Subis	James Wong Kin Min (SNAP)	4,391	46.36%	Ekoon Bantar (SUPP)	3,892	41.09%	9,472	499	73.67%
1969	P142 Miri-Subis	James Wong Kin Min (SNAP)	4,391	46.36%	Guyang Nisau (IND)	1,189	12.55%	9,472	499	73.67%
1974	P152 Miri-Subis	James Wong Kin Min (SNAP)	7,334	45.04%	Yang Siew Sang (SUPP)	8,949	54.96%	16,283	1,615	67.68%
1990	P177 Bintulu	James Wong Kin Min (SNAP)	6,337	37.41%	Chiew Chiu Sing (DAP)	6,050	33.14%	18,255	287	62.50%
1990	P177 Bintulu	James Wong Kin Min (SNAP)	6,337	37.41%	Salleh Jafaruddin (PERMAS)	3,227	17.68%	18,255	287	62.50%
1990	P177 Bintulu	James Wong Kin Min (SNAP)	6,337	37.41%	Francis Lutau Jilan (IND)	2,118	11.60%	18,255	287	62.50%
1990	P177 Bintulu	James Wong Kin Min (SNAP)	6,337	37.41%	Daniel Sigah Limbai (IND)	523	2.86%	18,255	287	62.50%
1995	P189 Bintulu	James Wong Kin Min (SNAP)	10,370	45.64%	Chiew Chiu Sing (DAP)	12,416	53.54%	22,719	1,794	63.72%
1995	P189 Bintulu	James Wong Kin Min (SNAP)	10,370	45.64%	Jonny Walker Tinggang (IND)	185	0.81%	22,719	1,794	63.72%

Sarawak State Legislative Assembly
Year	Constituency	Candidate	Votes	Pct	Opponent(s)	Votes	Pct	Ballots cast	Majority	Turnout
1969	N47 Limbang	James Wong Kim Min (SNAP)	2,935	63.69%	Bakar Abdullah (PPBB)	1,068	23.18%	4,608	867	79.85%
1969	N47 Limbang	James Wong Kim Min (SNAP)	2,935	63.69%	Pugi Yabai (IND)	385	8.36%	4,608	867	79.85%
1969	N47 Limbang	James Wong Kim Min (SNAP)	2,935	63.69%	Tahir Hassan (IND)	220	4.77%	4,608	867	79.85%
1974	N47 Limbang	James Wong Kim Min (SNAP)	3,224	57.52%	Mustapha Besa (BN)	2,224	39.68%	5,605	1,000	
1974	N47 Limbang	James Wong Kim Min (SNAP)	3,224	57.52%	Lim Cho Seng (IND)	157	2.80%	5,605	1,000	
1979	N47 Limbang	James Wong Kim Min (SNAP)	Unopposed							
1983	N47 Limbang	James Wong Kim Min (SNAP)	Unopposed							
1987	N47 Limbang	James Wong Kim Min (SNAP)	Unopposed							
1991	N47 Limbang	James Wong Kim Min (SNAP)	5,813	52.99%	Edward Guatee Sundai (PBDS)	2,819	25.70%	10,971	2,994	69.57%
1991	N47 Limbang	James Wong Kim Min (SNAP)	5,813	52.99%	Munir Karim (PERMAS)	2,160	19.69%	10,971	2,994	69.57%
1991	N47 Limbang	James Wong Kim Min (SNAP)	5,813	52.99%	Alan Dunggat (DAP)	179	1.63%	10,971	2,994	69.57%
1996	N60 Limbang	James Wong Kim Min (SNAP)	Unopposed							

== Honours ==
- Sarawak
  - Knight Commander of the Order of the Star of Hornbill Sarawak (DA) – Datuk Amar (1985)
  - Knight Commander of the Most Exalted Order of the Star of Sarawak (PNBS) – Dato Sri, formerly Dato' (1965)

Political offices
Preceded by Lim Kit Siang	Leader of the Opposition of Malaysia; August 1974 – October 1974	Succeeded by Edmund Langgu Saga
Preceded by Post created	Deputy Chief Minister of Sarawak; 1963–1966	Succeeded by Unknown
Party political offices
Preceded by Dunstan Endawie Enchana	President of Sarawak National Party; 1981–2003	Succeeded by Edwin Dundang Bugak
