= 1959 Sarawak district council elections =

Malaysian state indirect elections

The first Sarawak district council elections were held at the end of 1959. It was a multi-tiered system functioned to elect 24 members into Council Negri (now Sarawak State Legislative Assembly).

== Background ==
After Sarawak became a crown colony on 1 July 1947, Sir Charles Noble Arden-Clarke, the then governor of Sarawak issued "Notes on the Development of Local Government in Sarawak". This led to the setting up of local authorities in Sarawak, financed by population-based capitation grants, customary taxes, and license fees. By 1957, local authorities covered all areas in Sarawak. In 1959, the crown colony government decided to standardise the rates-collecting system for all local authorities in Sarawak. The amount of rates collected was based on property values and matched by one or two-dollar government grants for every dollar collected in rates.

Sarawak (Constitution) Orders in Council, 1956 stipulated that the Council Negri should consist of 14 ex officio members, 24 elected members, four nominated members, and three standing members. Ex officio members were the chief secretary, the attorney-general, the finance secretary, the Residents of the five divisions, and six other government officers appointed by the Governor. The standing members were those who were appointed during the Brooke era and served in the colonial government. The seat of a standing member will remain vacant if it becomes empty. Elected and nominated members must be British subjects or British protected persons of at least 25 years old who have resided in Sarawak for 7 out of 10 years before the election. Elected members will be composed of members elected by the five Divisional Advisory Councils and three Urban Councils of Kuching, Sibu, and Miri.

Kuching Municipal Council held its first local council election on 4 November 1956. This was followed by the Sibu Urban District Council, which held its first local council election on 15 December 1957.

Before the election, the oldest political party in Sarawak, Sarawak United Peoples' Party (SUPP) was founded in June 1959.

== Elections ==
This is the first general election for the state of Sarawak. Each ward functioned to elect three candidates into the respective councils.

This is the second local council election of the Kuching Municipal Council. It was held on 15 November 1959. The local council consisted of 9 Wards with 27 seats up for grabs. A total of 52 candidates were competing for the seats. An election petition was filed in the Kuching High Court for the Market Ward, where two candidates tied for the 3rd place. A re-election of the Ward was held on 29 November 1959. After the elections, 15 councillors returned victorious out of 27 incumbent councillors.

== Aftermath ==
After the elections, all the 24 elected members from local councils started working on 1 January 1960, guided by a handbook on the duties of local authorities and councilors.

After the electoral success of SUPP in Kuching urban and rural areas, the Datu Bandar called on all the Council Negri members who were not SUPP members to form an entirely new party with "an entirely different outlook than SUPP". As a result, the political party named Parti Negara Sarawak (PANAS) was founded on 9 April 1960, 10 months after the formation of SUPP.

The first local council elections for Miri Urban District Council (MUDC) were held on 18 December 1960. A total of 42 people are vying for 18 councillors' positions in 8 wards. A total of 2,065 voters would cast their ballots. MUDC was later upgraded to Miri District Council in 1961 after the polls.
