= Sarawak People's National Party =

Sarawak People's National Party Parti Negara Rakyat Sarawak PNRS / NEGARA
- Abbreviation: PNRS / NEGARA
- Founded: July 1974
- Dissolved: Defunct
- Headquarters: Kuching, Sarawak
- Colours: White, red, blue, yellow, green
- Dewan Negara: 0 / 70
- Dewan Rakyat: 0 / 222
- State Legislative Assembly: 0 / 60

The Sarawak People's National Party or Malay: Parti Negara Rakyat Sarawak (PNRS), also known by the acronyms "NEGARA" and was initially known as "Parti PEACE" is a minor Sarawakian political party which was formed in July 1974. It was rumoured to be secretly funded by United Bumiputera Heritage Party (PBB) of Sarawak Barisan Nasional (BN) to split opposition votes although the claim was never verified.

== General election results ==
Election	Total seats won	Total votes	Share of votes	Outcome of election	Election leader
1978	0 / 154	861	0.02%	; No representation in Parliament	N/A

== State election results ==
Sarawak State Legislative Assembly
Election	Votes		Seats			Position	Status
Election	Count	%	Result	Won / contested	+/–	Position	Status
1974	Did not contest						No seats
1979	Did not contest						No seats
1983	Did not contest						No seats
1987	Did not contest						No seats
1991	5,651	1.2	0 / 56	0 / 28	Steady	5th	No seats

== See also ==
- Politics of Malaysia
- List of political parties in Malaysia
