= 1979 Sarawak state election =

Malaysian state legislative election

- 15–22 September 1979

All 48 seats in the Council Negri 25 seats needed for a majority
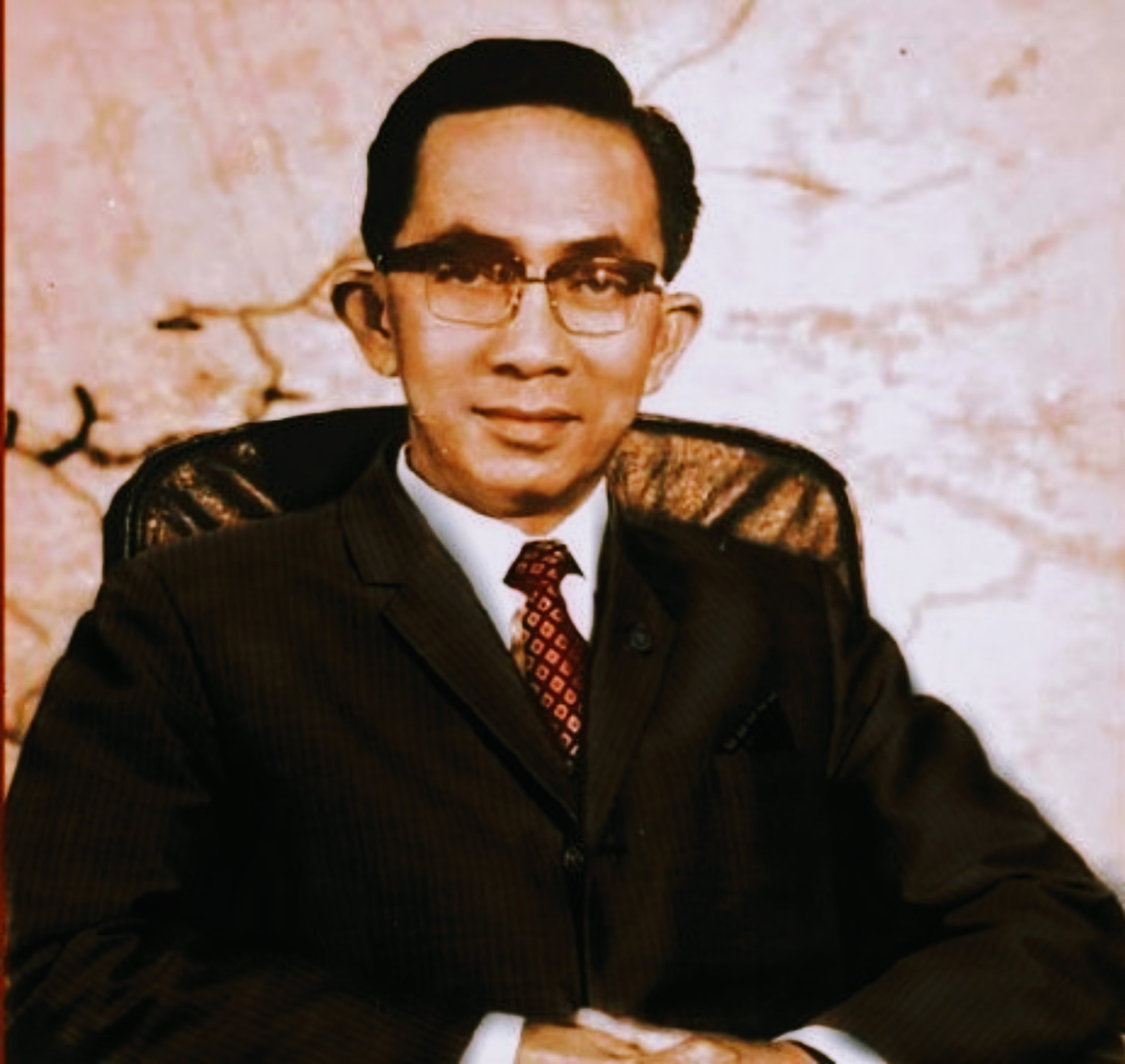

	Majority party	Minority party
Leader	Abdul Rahman Ya'kub	None
Party	PBB	Independent
Alliance	BN
Leader's seat	Matu-Daro
Seats before	30	0
Seats won	45	3
Seat change	▲15	▲3
Popular vote	193,918	61,944
Percentage	61.51%	19.65%
Swing	–	–
Chief Minister before election
Abdul Rahman Ya'kub
BN-PBB
Elected Chief Minister
Abdul Rahman Ya'kub
BN-PBB

The third Sarawak state election was held from 15 September 1979 to 22 September 1979. It is the first time that Sarawak held state election separately from the 1978 Malaysian general election. This is also the first time that the election rallies were banned in Sarawak. However, candidates and political parties were free to hold talks and house to house canvassing for votes.

== Results ==
Sarawak Barisan Nasional won 45 out of 48 seats in the Council Negri (now Sarawak State Legislative Assembly) and 61.2% of the popular vote. A total of 44 seats were contested in this election. The remaining four seats were won uncontested by Barisan Nasional. A total of 41 candidates lost their election deposits as they failed to take one-eighth of the total votes cast for all the candidates in their constituencies. A total of four election petitions were filed in Sarawak high court. Of these election petitions, one was subsequently withdrawn while the remaining petitions were adjourned in the year 1980.

Seats won uncontested by Barisan Nasional were:

- N18 - Batang Air
- N20 - Layar
- N31 - Balingian
- N34 - Meluan

Party or alliance		Votes	%	Seats	+/–
Barisan Nasional	Parti Pesaka Bumiputera Bersatu	76,043	23.82	18	0
Barisan Nasional	Sarawak United Peoples' Party	64,746	20.28	11	–1
Barisan Nasional	Sarawak National Party	53,129	16.64	16	–2
Barisan Nasional	Total	193,918	60.73	45	+15
Democratic Action Party		32,893	10.30	0	New
Parti Rakyat Jati Sarawak		17,212	5.39	0	New
Sarawak People's Organisation		13,101	4.10	0	New
Parti Umat Sarawak		238	0.07	0	New
Independents		61,944	19.40	3	+3
Total		319,306	100.00	48	0
Valid votes		319,306	97.89		
Invalid/blank votes		6,887	2.11		
Total votes		326,193	100.00		
Registered voters/turnout		448,199	72.78		
Source: Election Commission of Malaysia, Tindak Malaysia Github

Registered voter count refers to total electorate of the contested constituencies. EC did not disclose total elector count for the four uncontested constituencies

=== Elected members ===
The full list of representatives is shown below:

No.	State Constituency	Member	Party
BN 45 | IND 3
N01	Lundu	Chong Kim Mook	BN (SUPP)
N02	Tasik Biru	Patrick Uren	IND
N03	Padungan	Tan Meng Chong	IND
N04	Stampin	Sim Kheng Hong	BN (SUPP)
N05	Petra Jaya	Hafsah Harun	BN (PBB)
N06	Satok	Abang Abu Bakar Abang Mustapha	BN (PBB)
N07	Sebandi	Sharifah Mordiah Tuanku Fauzi	BN (PBB)
N08	Muara Tuang	Adenan Satem	BN (PBB)
N09	Batu Kawah	Chong Kiun Kong	BN (SUPP)
N10	Bengoh	Stephen Yong Kuet Tze	BN (SUPP)
N11	Tarat	Robert Jacob Ridu	BN (PBB)
N12	Tebakang	Michael Ben Panggi	BN (SNAP)
N13	Semera	Abang Ahmad Urai Abang Mohideen	BN (PBB)
N14	Gedong	Mohammad Tawan Abdullah @ Hilary Tawan Masan	BN (PBB)
N15	Lingga	Daniel Tajem Miri	BN (SNAP)
N16	Sri Aman	Hollis Tini	BN (SUPP)
N17	Engkilili	Nading Lingeh	BN (SNAP)
N18	Batang Ai	David Jemut	BN (SNAP)
N19	Saribas	Zainuddin Satem	BN (PBB)
N20	Layar	Alfred Jabu Numpang	BN (PBB)
N21	Kalaka	Wan Yusof Tuanku Bujang	BN (PBB)
N22	Krian	Dunstan Endawie Enchana	BN (SNAP)
N23	Kuala Rajang	Mohamad Asfia Awang Nasar	BN (PBB)
N24	Matu-Daro	Abdul Rahman Ya'kub	BN (PBB)
N25	Repok	Law Hieng Ding	BN (SUPP)
N26	Meradong	Thomas Hii King Hiong	BN (SUPP)
N27	Maling	Wong Soon Kai	BN (SUPP)
N28	Seduan	Ting Ing Mieng	BN (SUPP)
N29	Igan	David Tiong Chiong Chu	BN (SUPP)
N30	Dudong	Sandah Jarrow	BN (SNAP)
N31	Balingian	Wan Habib Syed Mahmud	BN (PBB)
N32	Oya	Edwin Esnen Unang	BN (PBB)
N33	Pakan	Jawie Wilson Masing	BN (SNAP)
N34	Meluan	Gramong Jelian	BN (SNAP)
N35	Machan	Gramong Juna	BN (SNAP)
N36	Ngemah	Joseph Kudi	BN (SNAP)
N37	Katibas	Ambrose Blikau Enturan	BN (PBB)
N38	Pelagus	Jonathan Sabai Ajing	BN (SNAP)
N39	Baleh	Peter Gani Kiai	BN (SNAP)
N40	Belaga	Tajang Laing	IND
N41	Tatau	Joseph Mamat Samuel	BN (SNAP)
N42	Kemena	Celestine Ujang Jilan	BN (PBB)
N43	Subis	Mumin Kader	BN (PBB)
N44	Miri	Chia Chin Shin	BN (SUPP)
N45	Marudi	Edward Jeli Belayong	BN (SNAP)
N46	Telang Usan	Joseph Balan Seling	BN (SNAP)
N47	Limbang	James Wong Kim Min	BN (SNAP)
N48	Lawas	Noor Tahir	BN (PBB)

== Aftermath ==
This was the final election of Abdul Rahman as Chief Minister and leader of PBB; he would resign of both positions as well as his federal and state seats in 1981 to accept the position of Yang di-Pertua Negeri of Sarawak. His nephew and vice-president of PBB, Abdul Taib Mahmud would replace him as Chief Minister and party's president.

== See also ==
- Elections in Sarawak
- List of Malaysian State Assembly Representatives (1978–1982)
