= 1996 Sarawak state election =

Malaysian state legislative election

- 7–8 September 1996

All 62 seats in the Sarawak State Legislative Assembly 32 seats needed for a majority
- Registered: 580,543
- Turnout: 372,602 (64.18%)
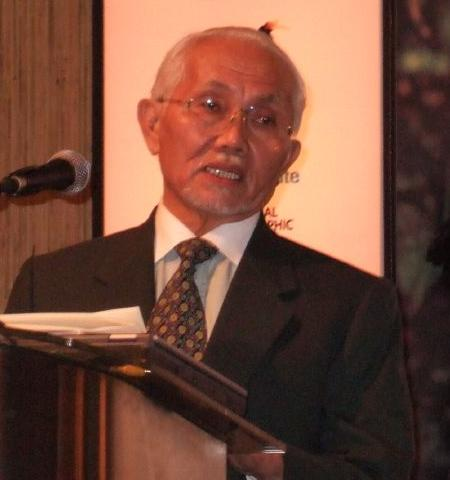

	Majority party	Minority party
Leader	Abdul Taib Mahmud	Wong Sing Nang
Party	BN	DAP
Leader since	26 March 1981	Unknown
Leader's seat	Asajaya	Pelawan
Last election	49 seats, 62.8%	0 seat, 9.7%
Seats before	56	0
Seats won	57	3
Seat change	▲1	▲3
Popular vote	242,839	32,421
Percentage	67.7%	9.0%
Swing	▲4.9%	▼0.6%
Chief Minister before election
Abdul Taib Mahmud
BN
Subsequent chief minister
Abdul Taib Mahmud
BN

The seventh Sarawak state election was held between Saturday, 7 September and Sunday, 8 September 1996 with nomination date on Tuesday, 27 August 1996. The Sarawak State Assembly was dissolved on 15 August 1996 before its expiration on 28 November 1996. There were 62 seats available but only 43 were contested on the election day. This election saw 580,543 registered voters of contested constituencies with 64.18% voters turned up to cast their votes.

Sarawak Barisan Nasional (BN) which was consisting of Sarawak United Peoples' Party (SUPP), Sarawak National Party (SNAP), Parti Pesaka Bumiputera Bersatu (PBB), and Sarawak Dayak People's Party (PBDS) fielded candidates for all 62 seats, followed by Democratic Action Party (DAP) fielding 6 candidates, while there were 60 independents jostling for 38 state seats in Sarawak. A total of 128 candidates was successfully nominated on the nomination day. PBDS which was an opposition party back in 1991 election, was re-accepted into Sarawak BN in 1994.

== Results ==
=== Summary ===
Party or alliance		Votes	%	Seats	+/–
Barisan Nasional	Parti Pesaka Bumiputera Bersatu	93,795	25.73	29	+2
Barisan Nasional	Sarawak United Peoples' Party	109,785	30.11	13	–3
Barisan Nasional	Sarawak National Party	17,285	4.74	7	+1
Barisan Nasional	Parti Bansa Dayak Sarawak	21,974	6.03	8	+1
Barisan Nasional	Total	242,839	66.61	57	+1
Democratic Action Party		32,421	8.89	3	+3
Independents		89,294	24.49	2	+2
Total		364,554	100.00	62	+6
Valid votes		364,554	97.84		
Invalid/blank votes		8,048	2.16		
Total votes		372,602	100.00		
Registered voters/turnout		580,543	64.18		

The above registered voter count represents total electorate of contested constituencies. Total electorate for Sarawak 1996 is 814347 where this includes 19 uncontested seats.

=== Results by constituency ===
There were 19 seats won uncontested by Sarawak BN on the nomination day. On the polling day, Sarawak BN won 38 out of 43 seats contested, thus made up to a total of 57 seats. DAP had made the first breakthrough by winning 3 seats as compared to previous state elections where the party returned empty handed. The remaining two seats were won by independents. Wong Soon Kai, the then deputy chief minister of Sarawak was defeated by Wong Ho Leng from DAP in the state constituency of Bukit Assek.

A total of 5 election petitions was filed to the Sarawak high court after the election:

Petition for N08 Padungan was filed by an independent candidate
Petition for N22 Bukit Begunan was filed by an independent candidate
Petition for N45 Balingian was filed by an independent candidate
Petition for N52 Kemena was filed by DAP
Petition for N53 Kidurong was filed by BN

The list of elected representatives is listed below:

No.	State Constituency	Elected state assembly members	Elected party
BN 57 | DAP 3 | IND 2
N01	Tanjung Datu	Datuk Ramsay Noel Jitam	BN (SUPP)
N02	Tasik Biru	Peter Nansian Anak Ngusie	BN (SNAP)
N03	Pantai Damai	Datin Paduka Sharifah Mordiah Tuanku Fauzi (Note: Won uncontested)	BN (PBB)
N04	Demak Laut	Dr Abang Draup Zamahari Pengirang Zen	BN (PBB)
N05	Tupong	Daud Abdul Rahman	BN (PBB)
N06	Satok	Datuk Abang Abdul Rahman Zohari bin Tun Abang Haji Openg	BN (PBB)
N07	Samariang	Dona Babel	BN (PBB)
N08	Padungan	Datuk Song Swee Guan	BN (SUPP)
N09	Pending	Sim Kheng Hui	BN (SUPP)
N10	Batu Lintang	Chan Seng Khai	BN (SUPP)
N11	Batu Kawah	Alfred Yap Chin Loi	BN (SUPP)
N12	Asajaya	Tan Sri Abdul Taib Mahmud	BN (PBB)
N13	Muara Tuang	Datuk Adenan Satem	BN (PBB)
N14	Bengoh	William Tanyuh	BN (SUPP)
N15	Tarat	Roland Sagah Wee Inn	BN (PBB)
N16	Tebedu	Michael Manyin Anak Jawong	BN (PBB)
N17	Kedup	Federick Bayoi Manggie	BN (PBB)
N18	Sadong Jaya	Wan Abdul Wahab Wan Sanusi	BN (PBB)
N19	Simunjan	Mohamad Naroden Majais	BN (PBB)
N20	Sebuyau	Julaihi Narawi	BN (PBB)
N21	Betting Maro	Bolhassan Di	BN (PBB)
N22	Bukit Begunan	Mong Ak Dagang	BN (PBDS)
N23	Simanggang	Francis Harden Anak Hollis	BN (SUPP)
N24	Engkilili	Toh Heng San	BN (SUPP)
N25	Batang Ai	Dublin Unting Ingkot	BN (PBDS)
N26	Saribas	Dr Haji Wahbi Bin Haji Junaidi	BN (PBB)
N27	Layar	Tan Sri Alfred Jabu Anak Numpang	BN (PBB)
N28	Kalaka	Abdul Wahab Aziz	BN (PBB)
N29	Krian	Peter Nyarok Entire	BN (SNAP)
N30	Belawai	Haji Hamden Ahmad	BN (PBB)
N31	Serdeng	Datuk Mohamad Asfia Awang Nassar	BN (PBB)
N32	Matu Daro	Datuk Abdul Wahab Dolah	BN (PBB)
N33	Meradong	Yii Chu Lik	IND
N34	Repok	Datuk David Teng Lung Chi	BN (SUPP)
N35	Pakan	Datuk William Mawan Anak Ikom	BN (SNAP)
N36	Meluan	Geman Anak Itam	BN (SNAP)
N37	Ngemah	Gabriel Adit Demong	BN (PBDS)
N38	Machan	Datuk Gramong Juna	BN (PBB)
N39	Bukit Assek	Wong Ho Leng	DAP
N40	Dudong	Dr Soon Choon Teck	BN (SUPP)
N41	Bawang Assan	Datuk Wong Soon Koh	BN (SUPP)
N42	Pelawan	Wong Sing Nang	DAP
N43	Nangka	Awang Bemee Awang Ali Basah	BN (PBB)
N44	Dalat	Datuk Effendi Norwawi	BN (PBB)
N45	Balingian	Abdul Ajis Abdul Majeed	BN (PBB)
N46	Tamin	Joseph Entulu Belaun	BN (PBDS)
N47	Kakus	John Sikie Tayai	BN (PBDS)
N48	Pelagus	Datuk Sng Chee Hua	BN (PBDS)
N49	Katibas	Ambrose Blikau Enturan	BN (PBB)
N50	Baleh	Datuk Dr James Jemut Masing	BN (PBDS)
N51	Belaga	Stanley Ajang Batok	BN (SNAP)
N52	Kemena	Celestine Ujang Anak Jilan	BN (PBB)
N53	Kidurong	Wong Sing Ai	DAP
N54	Jepak	Talib Bin Zulpilip	BN (PBB)
N55	Lambir	T E Aidan Wing	BN (PBB)
N56	Piasau	Datuk Dr George Chan Hong Nam	BN (SUPP)
N57	Senadin	Lee Kim Shin	BN (SUPP)
N58	Marudi	Sylvester Entri Anak Muran	BN (SNAP)
N59	Telang Usan	Kebing Wan	IND
N60	Limbang	Datuk Amar James Wong Kim Min	BN (SNAP)
N61	Lawas	Datuk Awang Tengah Ali Hasan	BN (PBB)
N62	Ba'kelalan	Dr Judson Sakai Tagal	BN (SNAP)
