= 1970 Sarawak state election =

Malaysian state legislative election

- 10 May 1969 – 7 June 1969 (suspended due to 13 May incident); 6 June 1970 – 4 July 1970

All 48 seats in the Council Negri 25 seats needed for a majority
- Registered: 332,373
- Turnout: 265,898 (80%)
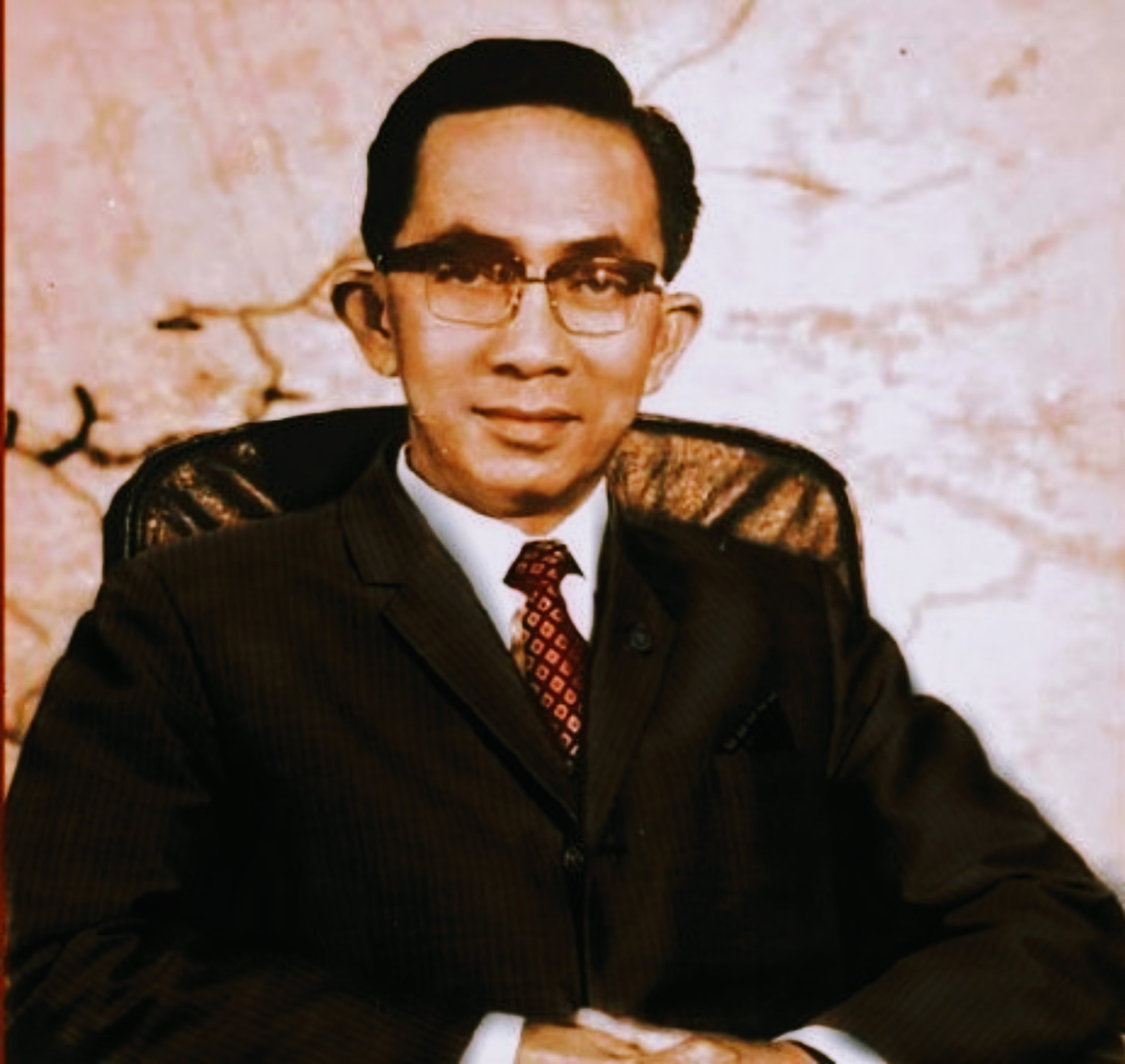

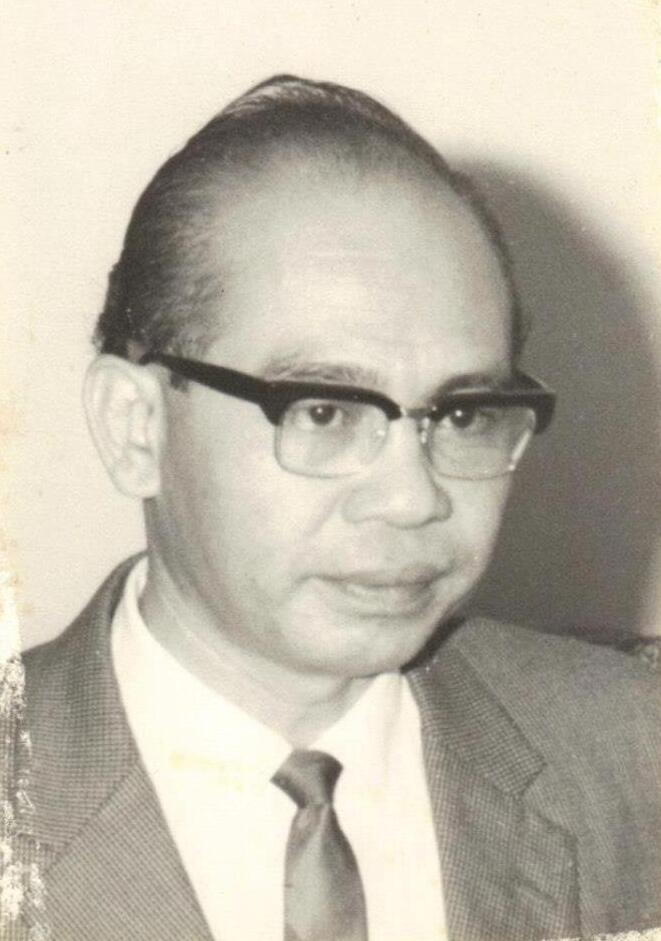

	Majority party	Minority party	Third party
Leader	Abdul Rahman Ya'kub	Ong Kee Hui	Stephen Kalong Ningkan
Party	Sarawak Alliance	SUPP	SNAP
Leader since	unknown	1959	1961
Leader's seat	Kuala Rajang	Not contesting	Layar
Last election	N/A	N/A	N/A
Seats before	N/A	N/A	N/A
Seats won	15	12	12
Seat change	–	–	–
Popular vote	63,668	72,178	61,241
Percentage	25.4%	28.8%	24.4%
Swing	–	–	–
	Fourth party
Leader	Jugah Barieng
Party	PESAKA
Leader's seat	Not contesting
Last election	N/A
Seats before	N/A
Seats won	8
Seat change	–
Popular vote	34,281
Percentage	13.29%
Swing	–
Chief Minister before election
Tawi Sli
Alliance
Subsequent chief minister
Abdul Rahman Ya'kub
Alliance

The first Sarawak state election was held from Saturday, 10 May 1969 and scheduled to be completed on Saturday, 7 June 1969 which lasted for 4 weeks and was carried out in staggered basis. This was due to the lack of transportation and communication systems in the state at that time. The state election was held at the same time as the 1969 general election. The Dewan Rakyat of the Malaysian Parliament and all the state assemblies were dissolved on 20 March 1969, except for Kelantan (which dissolved later on 31 March) and Sabah (which were not up for election as it had held its state election in 1967). The nomination date was set on Saturday, 5 April 1969. However, because of the riot occurred during 13 May incident and the declaration of emergency and the promulgation of Emergency (Essential Powers) Ordinance No. 1 of 1969 on 15 May 1969, all the ongoing polls were suspended until 1970. During when the suspension was enforced, polling in 9 out of 48 constituencies in Sarawak had started. None of the elections in Sarawak was completed at that time.

== Background ==
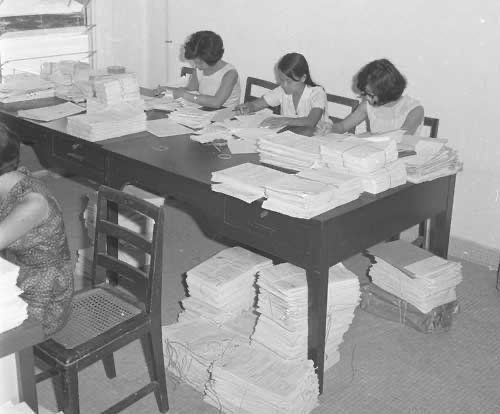
General Election Regulation Commission Office workers during 1969 Sarawak parliamentary and state elections.

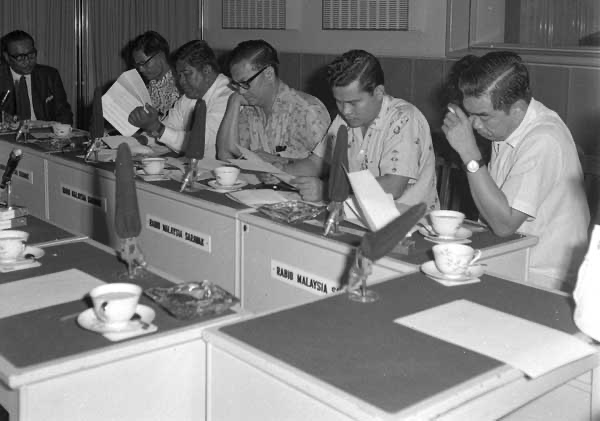
Media personnel during briefings in 1969 Sarawak parliamentary and state elections.

Prior to 1969 election, a political party was suspended from contesting in general election. The political party later mounted a public campaign calling the voters to boycott the election. The Sarawak parliamentary and state election was resumed from Saturday, 6 June 1970 to Saturday, 4 July 1970. During the resumption of the election, there was a tragedy in Sarikei in the third division of Sarawak on 29 June 1970. The communist terrorists had killed three election officials on their return journey after completing polling at a station. There was also an incident where a land mine was exploded outside the polling station in the same division.

This election saw 332,373 eligible voters after the first registration in Sarawak. Of these eligible voters, 26% were the Malays, 28 were the Chinese, and 46 percent were from Dayaks. The turn up rate of voters was 80.0%, which was considered high as compared to other states in Malaysia. A total of 221 candidates were contesting for 48 state seats in Sarawak. The breakdown of number of seats were:

- 33 seats were contested by Sarawak Alliance (Perikatan Sarawak in Malay). It was made up of Parti Bumiputera Sarawak (BUMIPUTERA) and Sarawak Chinese Association (SCA)
- 40 seats by Sarawak United Peoples' Party (SUPP)
- 35 seats by Parti Pesaka Sarawak (Pesaka)
- 47 seats by Sarawak National Party (SNAP)

There were 66 independent candidates vying for the seats.

== Results ==
=== Summary ===
As a result of Parti Bumiputera-SCA alliance, SCA received majority of its votes from Malay voters. Meanwhile, Dayak parties (SNAP and PESAKA) only attracted 37.6% of the vote although the Dayak people made up of 46% of the electorate.

Party or alliance		Votes	%	Seats
Sarawak United Peoples' Party		72,178	28.82	12
Sarawak Alliance	Parti Bumiputera Sarawak	33,990	13.57	11
Sarawak Alliance	Sarawak Chinese Association	29,768	11.89	4
Sarawak Alliance	Total	63,668	25.42	15
Sarawak National Party		61,241	24.45	12
Parti Pesaka Sarawak		34,281	13.69	8
Independents		18,987	7.58	1
Total		250,445	100.00	48
Valid votes		250,445	94.04	
Invalid/blank votes		15,870	5.96	
Total votes		266,315	100.00	
Registered voters/turnout		332,737	80.04	
Source: Almanak Keputusan Pilihan Raya Umum: Parlimen & Dewan Undangan Negeri (1959-1999)Tindak Malaysia Github

=== Results by constituency ===
The full list of representatives is shown below:

No.	State Constituency	Elected Council Negri Members	Elected Party
Alliance 15 | SNAP 12 | SUPP 12 | Pesaka 8 | IND 1
S01	Lundu	Chong Kim Mook	SUPP
S02	Bau	Ong Ah Khim	SUPP
S03	Kuching Barat	Cheng Yew Kiew	Alliance
S04	Kuching Timor	Stephen K.T. Yong	SUPP
S05	Semariang	Ajibah Abol	Alliance
S06	Sekama	Sim Kheng Hong	SUPP
S07	Sebandi	Ikhwan bin Abang Haji Zainei	Alliance
S08	Muara Tuang	Mohamad Musa	Alliance
S09	Batu Kawah	Chong Kiun Kong	SUPP
S10	Bengoh	Segus Anak Ginyai	SUPP
S11	Tarat	Nelson Kundai Ngareng	SNAP
S12	Tebakang	Michael Ben Ak Panggi	SNAP
S13	Semera	Lee Thiam Kee(Puteh)	Alliance
S14	Gedong	Abang Haji Abdul Rahim	Alliance
S15	Lingga-Sebuyau	Dato' Penghulu Tawi Sli	Pesaka
S16	Simanggang	Nelson Liap Kudu	SNAP
S17	Engkilili-Skrang	Simon Dembab Maja	Pesaka
S18	Ulu Ai	David Anak Jemut	SNAP
S19	Saribas	Kihok bin Amat	Alliance
S20	Layar	Dato' Stephen Kalong Ningkan	SNAP
S21	Kalaka	Wan Alwi bin Tuanku Ibrahim	Pesaka
S22	Krian	Dunstan Endawie Enchana	SNAP
S23	Kuala Rajang	Dato' Haji Abdul Rahman Ya'kub	Alliance
S24	Repok	Khoo Peng Loong	SUPP
S25	Matu-Daro	Awang Hipni bin Pengiran Anu	Alliance
S26	Binatang	Anthony Teo Tiao Gin	SUPP
S27	Sibu Tengah	Chew Kim Poon	SUPP
S28	Sibu Luar	Wong Kah Sing	SUPP
S29	Igan	Ling Beng Siong	Alliance
S30	Dudong	Kong Chung Siew	SUPP
S31	Balingian	Mohd. Pauzi bin Hamdani	Alliance
S32	Oya	Vincent Ferrer Suyong	Alliance
S33	Pakan	Mandi Anak Sanar	Pesaka
S34	Meluan	Gramong Anak Jelian	SNAP
S35	Machan	Thomas Kana	Pesaka
S36	Ngemah	Lias Anak Kana	IND
S37	Song	Ngelambong Bangau	SNAP
S38	Pelagus	Bennet Jarrow	Pesaka
S39	Baleh	Kenyan Anak Temenggong Koh	Pesaka
S40	Belaga	Nyipa Kilah	SUPP
S41	Tatau	Awang Ismail bin Pg. Zainuddin	Alliance
S42	Kemana	Ahok Anak Jalin	Pesaka
S43	Subis	Francis Loke	SNAP
S44	Miri	Chia Chin Shin	Alliance
S45	Marudi	Edward Jeli Anak Blayong	SNAP
S46	Telang Usan	Balan Seling	SNAP
S47	Limbang	Dato' James Wong Kim Min	SNAP
S48	Lawas	Awang Daud bin Awang Metusin	Alliance

== Aftermath ==
The prime minister of Malaysia, Tun Abdul Razak invited SUPP to join the Sarawak Alliance a month before the election to form a coalition government as SNAP previously did not have a good relationship with the federal government. SUPP eventually followed the federal preferences to form a coalition government with Parti Bumiputera. This enables the coalition to secure a total of 27 out of 48 seats in the Sarawak Council Negri (now Sarawak State Legislative Assembly). SUPP joined the coalition government as an equal partner with Parti Bumiputera, where both parties signed a letter of understanding on the composition of the new Sarawak government cabinet. Abdul Rahman Ya'kub (Parti Bumiputera) was nominated as chief minister with Stephen Yong (SUPP) and Simon Demak Maja (PESAKA) as deputy chief ministers. SCA was excluded from the Sarawak cabinet positions after the elections.

== See also ==
- 1969 Malaysian general election
