= 1983 Sarawak state election =

Malaysian state legislative election

- 28–29 December 1983

All 48 seats in the Sarawak State Legislative Assembly 25 seats needed for a majority
- Registered: 505,872
- Turnout: 367,060 (72.56%)
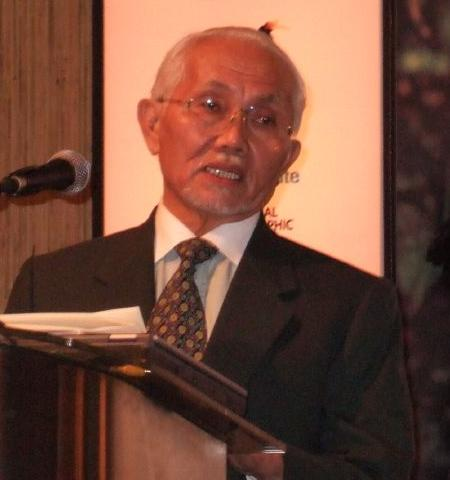

	Majority party	Minority party	Third party
Leader	Abdul Taib Mahmud	James Wong	Leo Moggie
Party	BN	SNAP	PBDS
Leader since	26 March 1981	December 1981	17 July 1983
Leader's seat	Sebandi	Limbang	Not contesting
Last election	45 seats, 61.2%	16 seats, 16.7%	New party
Seats before	45	16	-
Seats won	30	8	6
Seat change	▼15	▼8	-
Popular vote	166,819	46,741	33,712
Percentage	46.2%	13.0	9.3
Swing	▲2.1%	▼7.3%	-
Chief Minister before election
Abdul Taib Mahmud
BN
Subsequent chief minister
Abdul Taib Mahmud
BN

The fourth Sarawak state election was held between Wednesday, 28 December and Thursday, 29 December 1983 with a nomination date on Thursday, 8 December 1983. The two-day duration of the election was shorter than the eight-day election in 1979 state election because of improvements in transportation and communication systems. Only 45 out of 48 seats were contested. The state assembly was dissolved on 18 November 1983 by the governor of Sarawak with the advice of chief minister of Sarawak, which was one year and 15 days earlier than the expiration of the state assembly on 3 December 1984.

The election was held during the peak of monsoon season. This election saw 505,872 registered voters eligible to vote, with 367,060 voters (72.56%) actually casting their votes. In this election, Sarawak Barisan Nasional (BN) fielded candidates for 32 seats, SNAP for 18 seats, PBDS for 14 seats, Democratic Action Party (DAP) for 7 seats, and Sarawak Democratik Bersatu (BERSATU) for 4 seats. There were 80 independents contesting for the seats.

== Background ==
The leadership crisis of Sarawak National Party (SNAP, a component party of BN) has caused the emergence of an offshoot party named Parti Bansa Dayak Sarawak (PBDS). However, chief minister Abdul Taib Mahmud decided to accept PBDS into the BN coalition. This has caused dissatisfaction of SNAP leadership towards Taib. Both parties SNAP and PBDS were unwilling to compromise any of their seats. Therefore, Taib decided to allow SNAP and PBDS to compete against each other by under their respective party symbols. Serious competitions occurred in state constituencies contested by PBDS and SNAP. Generally, this election was carried out in a peaceful and orderly manner except for the clashes between PBDS candidate and the election officials in N 35 Machan constituency. Sarawak BN, composed of Parti Pesaka Bumiputera Bersatu (PBB) and Sarawak United Peoples' Party (SUPP), won 29 seats on the election day. They later accepted SNAP and PBDS into the coalition, thus securing a total of 44 of 48 seats.

== Results ==
=== Summary ===
Party or alliance		Votes	%	Seats	+/–
Barisan Nasional	Parti Pesaka Bumiputera Bersatu	77,658	21.51	19	+1
Barisan Nasional	Sarawak United Peoples' Party	89,161	24.70	11	0
Barisan Nasional	Total	166,819	46.21	30	0
Sarawak National Party		46,741	12.95	8	-8
Parti Bansa Dayak Sarawak		33,712	9.34	6	New
Democratic Action Party		31,246	8.66	0	0
Sarawak Demokratik Bersatu		2,540	0.70	0	New
Independents		79,932	22.14	4	+1
Total		360,990	100.00	48	0
Valid votes		360,990	98.35		
Invalid/blank votes		6,070	1.65		
Total votes		367,060	100.00		
Registered voters/turnout		505,872	72.56		
Source: Hazis Tindak Malaysia Github

The above registered voter count refers to total electorate of contested constituencies. Total Electorate including three uncontested constituencies is 552184. Change of seat count for SNAP is based on comparison of SNAP previously contesting under the BN banner in 1979.

=== Results by constituency ===
The full list of representatives is shown below:

Three seats were won uncontested by Barisan Nasional (BN):

N24. Matu Daro won by Wahab Haji Dollah
N32. Oya won by Haji Salleh Jafaruddin
N44. Miri won by Dr George Chan Hong Nam

No.	State Constituency	Elected State Assembly Members	Elected Party
BN 30 | SNAP 8 | PBDS 6 | DAP 0 | BERSATU 0 | IND 4
N01	Lundu	Ramsay Noel Jitam	BN (SUPP)
N02	Tasik Biru	Patau Anak Rubis @ Dr Patau Rubis	SNAP
N03	Padungan	Song Swee Guan	BN (SUPP)
N04	Stampin	Sim Kheng Hong	BN (SUPP)
N05	Petra Jaya	Hafsah binti Harun	BN (PBB)
N06	Satok	Abang Abdul Rahman Zohari bin Tun Abang Haji Openg	BN (PBB)
N07	Sebandi	Datuk Patinggi Haji Abdul Taib bin Mahmud	BN (PBB)
N08	Muara Tuang	Adanan bin Haji Satem	BN (PBB)
N09	Batu Kawah	Chong Kiun Kong	BN (SUPP)
N10	Bengoh	Wilfred Rata Nissom	IND
N11	Tarat	Robert Jacob Ridu	BN (PBB)
N12	Tebakang	Michael Ben Ak Panggi	SNAP
N13	Semera	Wan Wahab bin Wan Sanusi	BN (PBB)
N14	Gedong	Mohammad Tawan bin Abdullah @ Hilary Tawan Ak Masan	BN (PBB)
N15	Lingga	Daniel Tajem Ak Miri	PBDS
N16	Sri Aman	Hollis Ak Tini	BN (SUPP)
N17	Engkilili	Sing Cho Nang	IND
N18	Batang Air	Sylvester Langit Ak. Uming	SNAP
N19	Saribas	Haji Zainuddin bin Haji Satem	BN (PBB)
N20	Layar	Alfred Jabu Anak Numpang	BN (PBB)
N21	Kalaka	Wan Yusof bin Tun Datuk Patinggi Tuanku Haji Bujang	BN (PBB)
N22	Krian	Langgu Ak. Sagu @ Edmund	PBDS
N23	Kuala Rajang	Saadi bin Olia	BN (PBB)
N24	Matu-Daro	Wahab Haji Dollah	BN (PBB)
N25	Repok	Teng Lung Chi	BN (SUPP)
N26	Meradong	Hii Kiang Hiong	BN (SUPP)
N27	Maling	Wong Soon Kai	BN (SUPP)
N28	Seduan	Ting Ing Mieng	BN (SUPP)
N29	Igan	Tiong Chiong Chu	BN (SUPP)
N30	Dudong	Wilfred Kiroh Ak. Jeram	IND
N31	Balingian	Wan Habib bin Syed Mahmud	BN (PBB)
N32	Oya	Haji Salleh Jafaruddin	BN (PBB)
N33	Pakan	Jawie Wilson Mas'	PBDS
N34	Meluan	German Ak. Itam	SNAP
N35	Machan	Gramong Juna	PBDS
N36	Ngemah	Joseph Ak. Kudi	PBDS
N37	Katibas	Ambrose Blikau Ak. Enturan	BN (PBB)
N38	Pelagus	Nueng Ak. Kudi	SNAP
N39	Baleh	James Jemut Masing	PBDS
N40	Belaga	Tajang Laing	BN (PBB)
N41	Tatau	Bolhassan bin Kambar	IND
N42	Kemena	Datuk Celestine Ujang Anak Jilan	BN (PBB)
N43	Subis	Usop bin Wahab	BN (PBB)
N44	Miri	Dr George Chan Hong Nam	BN (SUPP)
N45	Marudi	Edward Jeli Anak Blayong	SNAP
N46	Telang Usan	Balan Seling	SNAP
N47	Limbang	Dato James Wong Kim Min	SNAP
N48	Lawas	Datuk Haji Noor bin Haji Tahir	BN (PBB)

== See also ==
- List of Malaysian State Assembly Representatives (1982–1986)
