= Sarawak National Party =

Sarawak National Party Parti Kebangsaan Sarawak
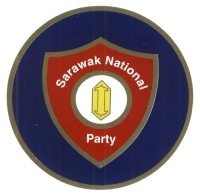
- Abbreviation: SNAP
- President: Edmund Stanley Jugol
- Secretary-General: Frankie Jurem Nyombui
- Women's Chief: Melissa Anne Inddu
- Youth Chief: Malachi Dennis Ningkan
- Founder: Stephen Kalong Ningkan
- Founded: 10 April 1961
- Legalised: 0
- Dissolved: 17 January 2013
- Succeeded by: Progressive Democratic Party (SPDP); New Sarawak National Party (SNAP Baru)
- Headquarters: Kuching, Sarawak State, Malaysia
- Newspaper: 0
- Think tank: 0
- Youth wing: 0
- Membership (2008): 399,978
- Ideology: Multiracialism; Sarawak regionalism Historical: Dayak interests
- Political position: Centre-right
- National affiliation: None (Note: The party was formerly part of the Alliance (1963–1966), Barisan Nasional (1976–2004), Barisan Bersatu Sarawak (2006), and Pakatan Rakyat (2010–2011).)
- International affiliation: 0
- Colours: Maroon; Yellow; Blue; White; Grey
- Anthem: 0

Election symbol
- Snap-sarawak Logo.jpg

Party flag
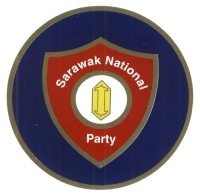

Website
- 0
- Politics of Malaysia; Political parties; Elections; Politics of Malaysia

The Sarawak National Party (SNAP; Malay: Parti Kebangsaan Sarawak) was a Sarawak-based political party in Malaysia. It was a member party of the Alliance Party from 1963 to 1966 and a member of Barisan Nasional (BN) from 1976 until its expulsion in 2004.

It contested the Malaysian general election, 2004 as well as the Sarawak state elections of Sarawak state election, 2006 and Sarawak state election, 2011 as an opposition party. The party became a component the then federal opposition Pakatan Rakyat (PR) coalition in April 2010, lasting only a year when, in April 2011, the party exited the coalition due to seat allocation disagreements with the People's Justice Party (PKR). Having been initially deregistered on 5 November 2002 by the Registrar of Societies (RoS), the party was finally deregistered on 17 January 2013 after the prior ruling was upheld by the Federal Court of Malaysia due to the party's failure to resolve its leadership crisis.

== History ==
=== Early years ===
The Sarawak National Party (SNAP) was founded on 10 April 1961, the third oldest political party to be formed in Sarawak after the Sarawak United Peoples' Party (SUPP) and Parti Negara Sarawak (PANAS). Its foundation opened the path for the active participation of ethnic Dayaks not only in the effort towards Sarawak's independence, but also for the community's full involvement in post-independence politics. Although there were ethnic Dayaks in SUPP and PANAS, the interests of the Dayaks were seen as secondary within the two parties and their leadership roles were minimal.

The Dayaks, particularly the Ibans, feared their community would be left behind in the decision makings of Sarawak, which was actively seeking independence, if they didn't have their own party. Thus, the Sarawak National Party was founded in Betong, Second Division, and its formation was celebrated by the vast majority of Ibans, who back then formed one-third of Sarawak's population. Among the party's founders were Stephen Kalong Ningkan, who became its secretary-general, Jonathan Samuel Tinker, the party's founding chairman, along with Edward Howell, Edwin Howell, Ivory Kedit, Mathew Dana Ujai, David Lawrence Usit, Nyipa Julin and Lionel Bediman Anak Ketit.

The first general assembly of the party was held on 29 April 1961 at Munggu Bangkit, Betong, where the party was formally established. The locality would go on to become the party's headquarters. An estimated 300 participants throughout the entirety of Sarawak attended the assembly. Soon after, Ningkan and Tinker went to the First, Fourth and Fifth Divisions canvassing for membership and, at the same time, forming party branches and sub-branches. The canvass took them three months before returning to Betong. Edward Jeli, who joined the party afterwards, canvassed for membership in Miri, while the others concentrated on the Second Division.

Following serious discussions, SNAP decided to accept non-Dayaks as party members in 1963 with James Wong Kim Min as the party's first ethnic Chinese member. Others who later joined included Wee Hood Teck, Wee Boon Ping and Ho Ah Chon. Meanwhile, Abang Othman Abang Haji Moasili became the first ethnic Malay to join the party. Wee Hood Teck and Wee Boon Ping went on to become the main financiers of the party. Their presence and that of other non-Dayaks transformed SNAP into a multiracial party, although the bulk of its members were Dayaks.

In August 1962, another Dayak-based party was established in Sibu to cater for the Ibans of Batang Rajang. Its founders had refused to join SNAP, claiming that the party only catered for Ibans from Saribas. The party was known as Parti Pesaka Anak Sarawak (PESAKA), the predecessor of the modern-day Parti Pesaka Bumiputera Bersatu (PBB), and among its initiators were Penghulu Masam Anak Radin, Pengarah Banyang, Penghulu Chundi Anak Resa and Penghulu Umpau. Temenggong Jugah, Temenggong Oyong Lawai Jau and Jonathan Bangau would join the party on a later date. While Jugah and Oyong Lawai Jau were incipiently members of PANAS, Bangau was from SUPP. Penghulus from other divisions such as Penghulu Tawi Sli (Second Division) and Penghulu Abok Anak Jalin (Bintulu) also joined PESAKA. PESAKA was, therefore, known as the Penghulus' Party (Malay: Parti Penghulu).

However, the individual who mooted the idea of forming PESAKA was Thomas Kana, a former dresser from Kuala Belait. He would become the first secretary-general of the party. Incidentally, Ningkan, a founding member of SNAP, was also a dresser in Kuala Belait. During their days in Kuala Belait, Ningkan and Kana greatly disliked one another and often threw insults at one another. When they returned to Sarawak, Ningkan formed SNAP and Kana formed PESAKA. Their rivalry began to sow the seeds of disunity among the Ibans of Sarawak, principally between the Ibans of Batang Rajang and the Iban of Saribas. Neither was willing to compromise as both wanted to become the head of their respective parties as well as in government. Far-fetched as it may be, Dayak unity as it is known today had its roots in the major differences and personal animosity between these two men.

=== 1983 leadership crisis ===
In the 1980s, a leadership crisis began brewing within the party. The crisis began in June 1980 when Dunstan Endawie Enchana, the then Deputy Chief Minister of Sarawak and president of SNAP, resigned from the party presidency. He had been appointed as Malaysian High Commissioner to New Zealand. Dunstan wished for Daniel Tajem to succeed him as the deputy chief minister while James Wong was to become president of the party. Joseph Samuel was also nominated for the party president post by party members. In a 25-member meeting, the delegates overwhelmingly supported Joseph Samuel for Sarawak deputy chief minister. However, Abdul Rahman Ya'kub, who was the Chief Minister of Sarawak, went against their wishes and appointed Daniel Tajem as his new deputy chief minister. Abdul Rahman's action had caused anger within the SNAP leadership as their democratic process had been disrespected.

Afterwards, Leo Moggie was appointed as the party's acting president. In March 1981, Abdul Rahman stepped down from the chief minister post and succeeded by his nephew, Abdul Taib Mahmud. During the party leadership election in December 1981, James Wong challenged Leo Moggie for the presidency of the party. The Moggie faction felt that SNAP, being a Dayak-based party, should be led by a Dayak rather than a Chinese. However, Wong's faction believed that James Wong had contributed greatly to the party, thus should be given the opportunity to lead the party. Wong successfully defeated Moggie for the presidency by a narrow majority of 15 votes. A key backer of Leo Moggie, Daniel Tajem, also lost his vice-president post to a Wong supporter, Edward Jeli. James Wong tried to calm the growing tensions within the party by offering appointed vice-president posts to Leo Moggie and Daniel Tajem. However, the offer failed to satisfy the Moggie faction.

The Malaysian parliament was dissolved on 29 March 1982 to make way for 1982 general election. James Wong tried to exclude Leo Moggie's supporters (Edmund Langgu, Edwin Tangkun, and Jonathan Narwin) from contesting as the party's nominees in the election. Chief minister Abdul Taib Mahmud decided to honour the list of candidates submitted by James Wong. However, the Sarawak ruling coalition led by Taib lost 5 parliamentary seats to the opposition. SNAP was a component party of BN at that time. Three seats were lost to Patrick Uren, Edmund Langgu, and Edwin Tanggun who were all former SNAP members contesting against their former party.

In 1983, Daniel Tajem, who was still the deputy chief minister of Sarawak, was expelled from SNAP after he was found guilty of assisting the campaigns of the former SNAP members in their candidacies against the official party list during the 1982 election. However, Daniel Tajem refused to step down from his post as the deputy chief minister. Consequently, in July 1983, Daniel Tajem and Leo Moggie formed a new party known as Parti Bansa Dayak Sarawak (PBDS) to challenge James Wong's leadership of SNAP. Leo Moggie became the inaugural president of PBDS while Daniel Tajem became the party's deputy president. PBDS immediately applied to join Taib's Barisan Nasional (BN) despite the strong opposition from SNAP. In a surprising turn of events, PBDS was agreed to be admitted into BN by Abdul Taib Mahmud despite strong opposition from Balang Seling, the then secretary-general of SNAP. The decision to admit PBDS into BN was also welcomed by Mahathir Mohamad, the prime minister of Malaysia at the time.

The admission of PBDS into BN had greatly weakened the position of SNAP in the coalition due to the party's overlap in electoral base, thus requiring the concession of electoral seats by SNAP towards PBDS. The formation of PBDS also further fragmented the voice of the Dayak community in the Sarawak state government. The Dayak community had already been divided between Muslim-bumiputera based Parti Pesaka Bumiputera Bersatu (PBB), Iban-based Sarawak National Party (SNAP), and Chinese-based Sarawak United Peoples' Party (SUPP) prior to this. In the 1983 election, SNAP wanted to retain all 18 seats it previously won in 1979 and was unwilling to give in to PBDS's demands for seats. Abdul Taib Mahmud thus decided to allow SNAP and PBDS to contest against one another in the 1983 Sarawak state election with their respective party symbols instead of the common Barisan Nasional symbol. In the election, SNAP ran candidates in 18 seats against 14 candidates fielded by PBDS. As a consequence, SNAP succeeded in winning 8 seats compared to 6 seats by PBDS after the election.

=== Pakatan Rakyat ===
On 18 April 2010, SNAP officially became a member of Pakatan Rakyat (PR), the national opposition coalition at the federal level. However, just short of a year after joining, SNAP withdrew from the coalition just days before the 2011 state election in April, citing seat allocation disagreements with the People's Justice Party (PKR).

=== Dissolution ===
SNAP was initially declared as a deregistered party on 5 November 2002 by the Registrar of Societies (RoS). The Federal Court of Malaysia decided on 17 January 2013 to uphold the RoS decision declaring SNAP a deregistered party due to its inability to furnish evidence that the leadership struggle in the party had been resolved.

=== Formation of SNAP Baru ===
In 2021, Edmund Stanley Jugol, the last president of SNAP before its dissolution, announced the founding of a new party known as SNAP Baru (English: New SNAP). The party claimed to be the successor of its deregistered namesake. However, the party has yet to register with RoS. The party declared support for Parti Sarawak Bersatu (PSB) in the 2021 Sarawak state election.

== Government offices ==
=== State governments ===
- Sarawak (1962–1966, 1976–1983, 1984–2004)

Note: bold as Premier/Chief Minister, italic as junior partner

== Election results ==
=== General election results ===
Election	Total seats won	Seats contested	Total votes	Share of votes	Outcome of election	Election leader
1964	4 / 159	11	Appointed by Council Negri		▲4 seats; Governing coalition (Alliance Party)	Stephen Kalong Ningkan
1969	9 / 144	16	64,593	2.69%	▲5 seats; Opposition	Stephen Kalong Ningkan
1974	9 / 144	11	117,566	5.55%	; Opposition, later Governing coalition (Barisan Nasional)	Dunstan Endawie Enchana
1978	9 / 154	9	45,218		; Governing coalition (Barisan Nasional)	Dunstan Endawie Enchana
1982	6 / 154	9	41,295		▼3 seats; Governing coalition (Barisan Nasional)	James Wong Kim Min
1986	4 / 177	9	34,221	0.72%	▼2 seats; Governing coalition (Barisan Nasional)	James Wong Kim Min
1990	3 / 180	9	35,754		▼1 seat; Governing coalition (Barisan Nasional)	James Wong Kim Min
1995	3 / 192	9	44,185		; Governing coalition (Barisan Nasional)	James Wong Kim Min
1999	4 / 193	9	45,519		▲1 seat; Governing coalition (Barisan Nasional)	James Wong Kim Min
2004	0 / 219	19	28,579	0.41%	▼4 seat; No representation in Parliament	Edwin Dundang Bugak
2008	0 / 222	19	12,567	0.16%	; No representation in Parliament	Edwin Dundang Bugak

=== State election results ===
Sarawak State Legislative Assembly
Election	Votes		Seats			Position (Note: As part of electoral coalition.)	Status
Election	Count	%	Result	Won / contested	+/–	Position	Status
1969/1970	61,241	24.5	12 / 48	12 / 47	▲12	3rd	Opposition
1974	111,438	42.7	18 / 48	18 / 47	▲6	▲2nd	Opposition (1974–1976)
1974	111,438	42.7	18 / 48	18 / 47	▲6	▲2nd	BN (1976–1979)
1979	53,129	16.6	16 / 48	16 / 18	▼2	1st (Barisan Nasional)	BN
1983	46,741	12.9	8 / 48	8 / 18	▼8	▼2nd	BN (Note: BN–PBDS–SNAP (1983–1984))
1987	36,415	8.1	3 / 48	3 / 11	▼5	▲1st (Barisan Nasional)	BN
1991	32,932	6.9	6 / 56	6 / 8	▲3	1st (Barisan Nasional)	BN
1996	17,285	4.7	8 / 62	8 / 8	▲2	1st (Barisan Nasional)	BN
2001	29,329	5.5	6 / 62	6 / 7	▼2	1st (Barisan Nasional)	BN (2001–2004)
2001	29,329	5.5	6 / 62	6 / 7	▼2	1st (Barisan Nasional)	Opposition (2004–2006)
2006	51,459	9.5	1 / 71	1 / 29	▼5	▼3rd	Opposition
2011	15,699	2.3	0 / 71	0 / 26	▼0	▲2nd (Pakatan Rakyat)	No seats

== See also ==
- List of political parties in Malaysia
- Politics of Malaysia
