= Parti Pesaka Bumiputera Bersatu =

Sarawakian political party in Malaysia

- English name: United Bumiputera Heritage Party
- Abbreviation: PBB
- President: Abang Abdul Rahman Zohari Abang Openg
- Chairperson: Mohamad Asfia Awang Nassar
- Secretary-General: Alexander Nanta Linggi
- Spokesperson: Abdul Karim Rahman Hamzah
- Deputy President: Douglas Uggah Embas; Awang Tengah Ali Hasan
- Senior Vice-President: Fadillah Yusof; Stephen Rundi Utom
- Vice-President: Roland Sagah Wee Inn; Ibrahim Baki; Julaihi Narawi; Gerawat Gala; Annuar Rapaee; Gerald Rentap Jabu; Len Talif Salleh
- Women's Chief: Fatimah Abdullah
- Youth Chief: Martin Ben
- Founder: Jugah Barieng
- Founded: 5 January 1973
- Legalised: 30 April 1973
- Merger of: Parti Bumiputera Sarawak (BUMIPUTERA)^{1} ^{2} Parti Pesaka Anak Sarawak (PESAKA)^{3}
- Headquarters: Kuching, Sarawak
- Newspaper: Jiwa Bakti
- Youth wing: Pemuda PBB
- Women's wing: Wanita PBB
- Membership: 379,833 (October 2025)
- Ideology: Regionalism; Nationalism; Social conservatism
- Political position: Right-wing
- National affiliation: Barisan Nasional (1973–2018) (Note: PBB's predecessors was part of Alliance separately: PANAS (1962–1963, 1965–1967); BARJASA (1962–1967); PESAKA (1962–1969, allied party 1970–1973); BUMIPUTERA (1967–1973); PANAS, PESAKA and BARJASA briefly formed Sarawak Native Alliance in 1965); Gabungan Parti Sarawak (since 2018) (Note: Through which the party is aligned with Barisan Nasional (since 2018) and was aligned with Perikatan Nasional (2020–2022)); National Unity Government (since 2022)
- Colours: Yellow, red, white and black
- Slogan: Bersatu Sentiasa, Mara Bersama (United Always, Marching Together)
- Anthem: March PBB (PBB March; Official anthem); Ikrar Wanita (Women's Oath; Women's anthem)
- Dewan Negara: 3 / 70
- Dewan Rakyat: 14 / 31 (Sarawak seats)
- Sarawak State Legislative Assembly: 47 / 82
- Premier of Sarawak: 1 / 10

Party's flag

Website
- pbb.org.my
- Politics of Malaysia; Political parties; Elections^{1} Parti Negara Sarawak and Barisan Rakyat Jati Sarawak merged to form Parti Bumiputera Sarawak.^{2} Parti Bumiputera Sarawak (BUMIPUTERA) consisted of Muslim Bumiputeras such as Sarawak Malay, Melanau, Kedayan, Brunei Malay, Jati Miriek and also predominantly non-Muslim Orang Ulu members.^{3} Parti Pesaka Anak Sarawak (PESAKA) consisted of majority Iban and Bidayuh members.

Parti Pesaka Bumiputera Bersatu (abbrev: PBB; English: United Bumiputera Heritage Party) is a political party based in Sarawak, East Malaysia. It is currently the largest multiracial and bumiputera's political party in Sarawak. Parti Pesaka Bumiputera Bersatu was formed from the combination of three parties in Sarawak; Parti Negara Sarawak, Barisan Rakyat Jati Sarawak and Parti Pesaka Anak Sarawak. The formation of the party was for the purpose of the improvement of the livelihood and protect the rights of the Bumiputera in many sectors such as politics, social, sports, education, infrastructures, financial & monetary autonomy, science, and technology. Formerly as a part of Peninsula-based coalition Barisan Nasional (BN), following the defeat of BN in the 2018 general election and in the aftermath of a meeting between all Sarawak-based BN coalition parties on 12 June 2018, PBB left the coalition to form a new Sarawak-based coalition, Gabungan Parti Sarawak.

== History ==
=== Predecessors ===
==== Parti Negara Sarawak (PANAS) ====
PANAS which was formed on 9 April 1960 by Abang Abu Bakar bin Abang Mustapha, was the second political party to be formed in Sarawak after Sarawak United Peoples' Party.

==== Barisan Ra'ayat Jati Sarawak (BARJASA) ====
BARJASA was formed on 4 December 1961 by Tuanku Bujang Tuanku Othman. Abdul Rahman Ya'kub and Abdul Taib Mahmud were among the earliest members of the party.

==== Parti Pesaka Anak Sarawak (PESAKA) ====
Parti Pesaka Anak Sarawak was formed in Sibu in August 1962 to cater for the Ibans of Batang Rajang. Its promoters refused to join the Sarawak National Party, which they claimed only catered for Ibans from Saribas.

Among the initiators of the party were Penghulu Masam Anak Radin, Pengarah Banyang, Penghulu Chundi Anak Resa and Penghulu Umpau. Temenggong Jugah Barieng, Temenggong Oyong Lawai Jau and Jonathan Bangau joined later. While Jugah and Oyong Lawai Jau were incipiently members of PANAS, Bangau was from SUPP. Other Penghulus from other divisions such as Penghulu Tawi Sli (Second Division) and Penghulu Abok Anak Jalin (Bintulu) also joined PESAKA. PESAKA was therefore known as the Penghulus’ Party. However, the person who actually mooted the idea of forming PESAKA was Thomas Kana, a former dresser at Kuala Belait. He was made the first secretary-general of the party.

=== Formation of Parti Bumiputera ===
To ensure the domination of Muslim Bumiputra in Sarawak politics, PANAS and BARJASA initiated a plan of merger a few months after the local council elections of Sarawak in 1963. Initially, both parties were willing to dissolve themselves in order to allow United Malays National Organisation to enter Sarawak. However, UMNO was not interested in accepting non-Muslim-Malay Bumiputeras as members. Therefore, the Malaysian federal government recommended that the two parties combine to form a new separate party. After a series of negotiations, Parti Bumiputera Sarawak was formed on 30 March 1968. On the following day after the merger, Abang Ikhwan Zaini was elected as the President of Parti Bumiputera, Tuanku Bujang as Vice-President, and Abdul Taib Mahmud as the secretary-general of the party. According to Sanib Said (former curator of Sarawak State Museum):

The formation of Parti Bumiputera was gratefully accepted by the Muslim-Malays of Sarawak. Except for a few prominent dissenters, especially some of the former members of PANAS, the new party was supported by both the aristocrats and the young intelligentsia, the latter holding the more important posts in it. It may be justifiably said that at last the young intelligentsia had triumphed. But basically the formation of Parti Bumiputera was a final reconciliation between the two groups and it opened the way for a new era of Malay politics in Sarawak.

Parti Bumiputera exercised a significant role in the Sarawak cabinet under the leadership of Sarawak Chief Minister Tawi Sli. Taib Mahmud dominated most of the decision making. Parti Bumiputera and Sarawak Chinese Association were the members of Sarawak Alliance. During the 1970 Sarawak state election, Parti Bumiputera won 12 seats while SCA won 3 seats out of a total of 48 seats. However, not a single party command a majority in Council Negri (now Sarawak State Legislative Assembly). Abdul Rahman from Parti Bumiputera was able to convince SUPP to form a state government with him as the chief minister.

=== Formation of PBB ===
Parti Bumiputera had already initiated negotiations with PESAKA about the merger of both parties in 1968. However, PESAKA refused to enter into a merger in fear that Muslim bumiputera members from Parti Bumiputera would dominate the new party, leaving its Iban and Bidayuh members sidelined. PESAKA decided to join Sarawak Alliance without a merger to preserve their interests in Sarawak politics. However, in the 1970 state election, PESAKA won only 8 seats, whereas 12 seats were won by Parti Bumiputera and another 12 seats by SNAP. PESAKA was not able to nominate a new chief minister from their own party unlike in 1966. Ultimately another negotiation was held between PESAKA and Parti Bumiputera in September 1972 and both sides eventually agreed to a merger on 5 January 1973. The new Parti Pesaka Bumiputera Bersatu party was then officially registered on 30 April 1973.

The party was divided into two wings namely:

- BUMIPUTERA wing which consisted of Muslim-Malay, Melanau, Kedayan, Brunei-Malay, Jatti Mereik, and Orang Ulu members
- PESAKA wing which consisted of Iban, Bidayuh, Kenyah, and Kelabit members

== Ideology ==
=== Objectives of PBB ===
- To fully protect and defend Sarawak independence, sovereignty, and all community in Sarawak.
- To uphold both the federal and Sarawak constitution.
- To combating and fight against corruption activities, racism, money laundering, and political power abuse among all party's members.
- To protect and defend the principles enshrined in the federal and region constitution, especially on position, fundamental rights, and special privileges of Bumiputera in Sarawak.
- To protect the future rights of Malay Bumiputera in Sarawak, and Malaysia overall.
- To protect and strengthen the rights of all Dayak community, especially Iban, Bidayuh and Orang Ulu in Sarawak.
- To develop all Sarawakians to work and build together to modernised in all various fields, mostly in education, sports, politic, financial and business, social, youth and women empowerment, culture & arts, science and technology, regional development projects, public infrastructure projects, and public services.
- To promote and protect the feeling of harmony and unity spirits of all Sarawakians towards creating a strong united multiracial region in Sarawak.
- To develop Sarawak as a peaceful, modernised, higher integrity, very high income, and greatest region in Malaysia.
- To promoting the harmonious, multicultural, peace and prosperous Sarawak to all community in Malaysia and also to around the world.
- To protect the rule of Sarawak democracy systems, and Malaysia parliamentary democracy.
- To protect, strengthen, and fully giving justice for the region of Sarawak, as based on Malaysia Agreement 1963 (MA63).
- To support and defend the United Nations' charter.
- To take effective steps in eradicating any subversive movements and dangerous situations which could compromise Malaysia's security and Sarawak's rights.

=== The meaning of "Bumiputera" ===
Bumiputera is a Malaysian political term and literally translates to son of earth. Being mentioned in the party's name, this directly relates to the ethnic groups that are seen as native to the state of Sarawak. Members of the party are solely of Sarawak Bumiputera ethnicity. In article 161a of the Federal Constitution of Malaysia, 21 ethnic groups are classified as "rakyat peribumi Sarawak" (natives of Sarawak), among these are the Ibans, Bidayuhs, Melanaus, Orang Ulus and several other Dayak people, as well as local Muslim-Malays of Sarawak.

== Organisational structure ==
The party structure of PBB is in many ways resembles to that of the national party United Malays National Organisation (UMNO) due to the influence exerted by Abdul Rahman Ya'kub. PBB has four levels of bureaucracy namely:

- General Assembly (similar to UMNO General Assembly)
- Supreme Council (similar to UMNO Supreme Council)
- Branches (set up in each state constituencies in Sarawak, similar to UMNO divisions which is set up in each parliamentary constituency in Malaysia except for the state of Sarawak.)
- Sub-branches (similar to UMNO branches)
- Each level will have its own youth and women wings

The party's general assembly is held every 3 years to assemble all party leaders and grassroot members to discuss party policies, responsibility of Supreme Council, and to elect party leaders into Supreme Council but does not influence party directions and policies. The party constitution was amended so that "the party's system of representation of at general assemblies in line with the system used by UMNO". Therefore, a chairman will be in-charge of the general assembly, allowing the party president take an active role during the assembly. The party's first ever general assembly was held from 13 to 14 July 1974, less than a month before the 1974 Malaysian general election. All the party's top posts were not contested at that time. In this general assembly, Abang Abu Bakar and Salleh Jafaruddin (Rahman's nephew) from bumiputera wing were elected to the party's executive committee. Alfred Jabu Numpang, from PESAKA wing was also elected to become youth chief of the party. He would later become deputy chief minister of Sarawak under the chieftainship of Taib Mahmud.

The Supreme Council consisted of:

- Yang di-Pertua (also known as President)
- Deputy Yang di-Pertua (also known as Deputy President)
- Vice-Yang di-Pertuas (also known as Vice-Presidents, consisted of 9 people)
- Secretary-General
- Deputy Secretary-General
- Assistant Secretary-General (5 people)
- Treasurer
- Assistant Treasurer
- Publicity Chief
- Assistant Publicity Chief
- Elected Executive Committee members (20 people)
- Appointed Executive Committee members (11 people)

During the formation of PBB, both Parti Bumiputera and PESAKA agreed to elect a PESAKA leader to become the president of the party. The party had 7 Vice-Presidents instead of the current 9 members. 4 Vice-President posts will be given to Bumiputera wing while 3 will be given to PESAKA wing. The Secretary-General post will be given to Bumiputera wing while Assistant Secretary-General posts will be divided among Bumiputera wing (1 person) and PESAKA wing (3 people). The rest of the party posts were given to Bumiputera wing while the Youth Chief post will be given to PESAKA wing.

=== Supreme Council (2025–2028) ===
- Chairman:
  - Mohamad Asfia Awang Nassar
- President:
  - Abang Abdul Rahman Zohari Abang Openg
- Deputy President (Pesaka Wing):
  - Douglas Uggah Embas
- Deputy President (Bumiputera Wing):
  - Awang Tengah Ali Hasan
- Senior Vice President (Pesaka Wing):
  - Stephen Rundi Utom
- Senior Vice President (Bumiputera Wing):
  - Fadillah Yusof
- Vice Presidents (Pesaka Wing):
  - Roland Sagah Wee Inn
  - Gerawat Gala
  - Gerald Rentap Jabu
- Vice Presidents (Bumiputera Wing):
  - Ibrahim Baki
  - Julaihi Narawi
  - Annuar Rapaee
  - Talif @ Len Salleh
- Women's Wing Chief:
  - Fatimah Abdullah
- Youth Wing Chief:
  - Martin Ben
- Secretary-General:
  - Alexander Nanta Linggi
- Deputy Secretary-General:
  - Fazzrudin Abdul Rahman
- Assistant Secretaries-General:
  - Hasbi Habibollah
  - Sharifah Hasidah Sayeed Aman Ghazali
  - Hamzah Brahim
  - Miro Simuh
  - Maurice Joannes Giri
- Treasurer:
  - Abdul Rahman Junaidi
- Assistant Treasurer:
  - Ripin Lamat
- Information Chief:
  - Abdul Karim Rahman Hamzah
- Assistant Information Chief:
  - Philip Raja
- Law Advisor:
  - Awang Bemee Awang Ali Basah
- Elected Supreme Council Members (Bumiputera Wing):
  - Yusuf Abd Wahab
  - Aidel Lariwoo
  - Abdul Yakub Arbi
  - Mohamad Duri
  - Safiee Ahmad
  - Abdullah Saidol
  - Mohammad Razi Sitam
  - Awla Dris
  - Razaili Gapor
  - Haidar Khan Asghar Khan
  - Ahmad Ibrahim
  - Iskandar Turkee
  - Awangku Jinal Abedin Pengiran Jawa
  - Sulhie Salleh
  - Syed Hamzah Wan Hamid Edruce
  - Julaihi Mohamad
- Elected Supreme Council Members (Pesaka Wing):
  - Jefferson Jamit Unyat
  - Lidam Assan
  - John Ilus
  - Michael Mujah Lihan
  - Richard Rapu @ Aman Begri
  - Simon Sinang Bada
  - Willie Mongin
  - Daniel Jubang
  - Paulus Palu Gumbang
  - Jerip Susil
  - Dennis Ngau
  - Henry Sum Agong
  - Leonard Jambu
  - Jawan Nyaun
- Appointed Supreme Council Members (Bumiputera Wing):
  - Abdul Rahman Ismail
  - Idris Buang
  - Lukanisman Awang Sauni
  - Ahmad Johnie Zawawi
  - Hazland Abang Hipni
  - Juanda Jaya
  - Azizul Annuar Adenan
  - Mohd Naroden Majais
  - Dayang Nurfizawati Abang Abdul Karim
- Appointed Supreme Council Members (Pesaka Wing):
  - William Mawan Ikom
  - Nuing Jeluing
  - Paulus Dandee Banyang
  - Romeo Christopher Tegong
  - Lesley Luyoh Akah
  - Wejok Tomik
  - Jampi Tutong
  - Fred Entau
  - Barnabas Kulor Kaoz Djunior
  - Patrict Anak Miden
  - Adison Langgar Injan
- Women Representatives in the Supreme Council:
  - Angelina Ujang
  - Nancy Shukri
  - Umang Nangku Jabu
  - Rubiah Wang
  - Dayang Noorazah Awang Sohor
- Youth Representatives in the Supreme Council:
  - Anderson Lah
  - Sufian Mohat
  - Martin Ngindang Richard Mullok
  - Afiq Fikri Brahim
  - Lyokarto Sikong

== Leadership ==
=== Yang di-Pertua (President) ===
Order	Name	Term of office		Elected
1	Jugah Barieng	30 April 1973	September 1975	
2	Abdul Taib Mahmud	October 1975	1978	
3	Abdul Rahman Ya'kub	1978	26 March 1981	
4	Abdul Taib Mahmud	26 March 1981	28 February 2014	
5	Adenan Satem	1 March 2014	11 January 2017	
6	Abang Abdul Rahman Zohari Abang Openg	14 January 2017	Incumbent	

After the formation of PBB, Temenggong Jugah Barieng was appointed as the first president of the PBB while Taib Mahmud was appointed deputy president and Abdul Rahman Ya'kub was appointed the secretary-general of the party. In September 1975, Abdul Rahman suddenly announced his retirement from politics due to criticisms to his administration of the Sarawak state. Few weeks later, Temenggong Jugah also announced his retirement as the president of PBB. In October 1975, Taib Mahmud was appointed to the president of PBB to fill the vacancy left by Temenggong Jugah while Leonard Linggi, the son of Temenggong Jugah, was appointed to the secretary-general post, replacing Abdul Rahman. However, Abdul Rahman remained as the executive member of PBB and the leader of Sarawak Barisan Nasional (BN). Alfred Jabu moved his rank to the deputy president post while Celestine Ujang fill the youth chief post left vacant by Alfred Jabu.

Two months later, Abdul Rahman changed his mind while he announced that he would not retire in the next five years. Abdul Rahman decided to take over the PBB presidency from Taib. For Taib, this was a dilemma but all the other party posts have been occupied. Taib demanded his uncle Abdul Rahman to create another deputy president post for him by changing the party constitution. Finally during the 1977 PBB general assembly meeting, another deputy president post was created and given to Taib while Abdul Rahman became the president of the party.

Rahman retired from politics on 26 March 1981 and his nephew Taib Mahmud succeeded him as the PBB president for the second time. After holding the post for 33 years, Taib Mahmud retired from politics while allowing his former brother-in-law, Adenan Satem to take over the party on 1 March 2014 and he would hold the post until his death on 11 January 2017.

Following the death of Adenan Satem, Abang Abdul Rahman Zohari Abang Openg was appointed as the 6th President of PBB on 13 January 2017.

== Elected representatives ==
=== Dewan Negara (Senate) ===
- His Majesty's appointee:
  - Awang Bemee Awang Ali Basah
- Elected by the Sarawak State Legislative Assembly:
  - Ahmad Ibrahim
  - Michael Mujah Lihan

=== Dewan Rakyat (House of Representatives) ===
==== Members of Parliament of the 15th Malaysian Parliament ====
PBB has 14 MPs in the House of Representatives.

State	No.	Parliament Constituency	Member	Party
Sarawak	P193	Santubong	Nancy Shukri	PBB
Sarawak	P194	Petra Jaya	Fadillah Yusof	PBB
Sarawak	P197	Kota Samarahan	Rubiah Wang	PBB
Sarawak	P198	Puncak Borneo	Willie Mongin	PBB
Sarawak	P200	Batang Sadong	Rodiyah Sapiee	PBB
Sarawak	P201	Batang Lupar	Mohamad Shafizan Kepli	PBB
Sarawak	P204	Betong	Richard Rapu	PBB
Sarawak	P206	Tanjong Manis	Yusuf Abd. Wahab	PBB
Sarawak	P207	Igan	Ahmad Johnie Zawawi	PBB
Sarawak	P213	Mukah	Hanifah Hajar Taib	PBB
Sarawak	P215	Kapit	Alexander Nanta Linggi	PBB
Sarawak	P218	Sibuti	Lukanisman Awang Sauni	PBB
Sarawak	P221	Limbang	Hasbi Habibollah	PBB
Sarawak	P222	Lawas	Henry Sum Agong	PBB
Total	Sarawak (14)			

=== Dewan Undangan Negeri (State Legislative Assembly) ===
==== Malaysian State Assembly Representatives ====
Sarawak State Legislative Assembly

47 / 82

State	No.	Parliamentary Constituency	No.	State Constituency	Member	Party
Sarawak	P193	Santubong	N03	Tanjong Datu	Azizul Annuar Adenan	PBB
Sarawak	P193	Santubong	N04	Pantai Damai	Abdul Rahman Junaidi	PBB
Sarawak	P193	Santubong	N05	Demak Laut	Hazland Abang Hipni	PBB
Sarawak	P194	Petra Jaya	N06	Tupong	Fazzrudin Abdul Rahman	PBB
Sarawak	P194	Petra Jaya	N07	Samariang	Sharifah Hasidah Sayeed Aman Ghazali	PBB
Sarawak	P194	Petra Jaya	N08	Satok	Ibrahim Baki	PBB
Sarawak	P197	Kota Samarahan	N15	Asajaya	Abdul Karim Rahman Hamzah	PBB
Sarawak	P197	Kota Samarahan	N16	Muara Tuang	Idris Buang	PBB
Sarawak	P197	Kota Samarahan	N17	Stakan	Hamzah Brahim	PBB
Sarawak	P198	Puncak Borneo	N18	Serembu	Miro Simuh	PBB
Sarawak	P198	Puncak Borneo	N19	Mambong	Jerip Susil	PBB
Sarawak	P198	Puncak Borneo	N20	Tarat	Roland Sagah Wee Inn	PBB
Sarawak	P199	Serian	N21	Tebedu	Simon Sinang Bada	PBB
Sarawak	P199	Serian	N22	Kedup	Maclaine Ben @ Martin Ben	PBB
Sarawak	P199	Serian	N23	Bukit Semuja	John Ilus	PBB
Sarawak	P200	Batang Sadong	N24	Sadong Jaya	Aidel Lariwoo	PBB
Sarawak	P200	Batang Sadong	N25	Simunjan	Awla Idris	PBB
Sarawak	P200	Batang Sadong	N26	Gedong	Abang Abdul Rahman Zohari Abang Openg	PBB
Sarawak	P201	Batang Lupar	N27	Sebuyau	Julaihi Narawi	PBB
Sarawak	P201	Batang Lupar	N28	Lingga	Dayang Noorazah Awang Sohor	PBB
Sarawak	P201	Batang Lupar	N29	Beting Maro	Razaili Gapor	PBB
Sarawak	P204	Betong	N35	Saribas	Ricky @ Mohamad Razi bin Sitam	PBB
Sarawak	P204	Betong	N36	Layar	Gerald Rentap Jabu	PBB
Sarawak	P204	Betong	N37	Bukit Saban	Douglas Uggah Embas	PBB
Sarawak	P205	Saratok	N38	Kalaka	Mohamad Duri	PBB
Sarawak	P205	Saratok	N40	Kabong	Mohd Chee Kadirh	PBB
Sarawak	P206	Tanjong Manis	N41	Kuala Rajang	Len Talif Salleh	PBB
Sarawak	P206	Tanjong Manis	N42	Semop	Abdullah Saidol	PBB
Sarawak	P207	Igan	N43	Daro	Safiee Ahmad	PBB
Sarawak	P207	Igan	N44	Jemoreng	Juanda Jaya	PBB
Sarawak	P209	Julau	N47	Pakan	William Mawan Ikom	PBB
Sarawak	P210	Kanowit	N50	Machan	Allan Siden Gramong	PBB
Sarawak	P212	Sibu	N55	Nangka	Annuar Rapaee	PBB
Sarawak	P213	Mukah	N56	Dalat	Fatimah Abdullah	PBB
Sarawak	P213	Mukah	N57	Tellian	Royston Valentine	PBB
Sarawak	P213	Mukah	N58	Balingian	Abdul Yakub Arbi	PBB
Sarawak	P215	Kapit	N62	Katibas	Ambrose Blikau Enturan	PBB
Sarawak	P215	Kapit	N63	Bukit Goram	Jefferson Jamit Unyat	PBB
Sarawak	P217	Bintulu	N67	Jepak	Iskandar Turkee	PBB
Sarawak	P217	Bintulu	N69	Kemena	Stephen Rundi Utom	PBB
Sarawak	P218	Sibuti	N71	Bekenu	Rosey Yunus	PBB
Sarawak	P218	Sibuti	N72	Lambir	Ripin Lamat	PBB
Sarawak	P220	Baram	N77	Telang Usan	Dennis Ngau	PBB
Sarawak	P220	Baram	N78	Mulu	Gerawat Gala	PBB
Sarawak	P221	Limbang	N79	Bukit Kota	Abdul Rahman Ismail	PBB
Sarawak	P221	Limbang	N80	Batu Danau	Paulus Palu Gumbang	PBB
Sarawak	P222	Lawas	N82	Bukit Sari	Awang Tengah Ali Hasan	PBB
Total	Sarawak (47)					

== Government offices ==
=== Governors ===
State	Leader type	Office Bearer
Sarawak	Yang Di-Pertua Negeri	Tun Dr. Wan Junaidi Tuanku Jaafar

=== State governments ===
State	Leader type	Office Bearer	State Constituency
Sarawak	Premier	Abang Abdul Rahman Zohari Abang Openg	Gedong

State	Leader type	Office Bearer	State Constituency
Sarawak	Deputy Premier I	Douglas Uggah Embas	Bukit Saban
Sarawak	Deputy Premier II	Awang Tengah Ali Hasan	Bukit Sari

PBB and its predecessors PESAKA and BUMIPUTERA has led the Sarawak state government since 1966, before which they were junior partner under SNAP-led government.

- Sarawak (1973–present)

PBB precursors:

- BUMIPUTERA (1967–1970, 1970–1973)
- PESAKA (1962–1966, 1966–1970, 1970–1973)
- BARJASA (1962–1967)
- PANAS (1965–1967)

Note: bold as Premier/Chief Minister, italic as junior partner

=== Legislative leadership ===
Portfolio	Office Bearer	Constituency
President of the Dewan Negara	Awang Bemee Awang Ali Basah	At-large

State	Leader type	Office Bearer	State Constituency
Sarawak	Speaker	Mohamad Asfia Awang Nassar	Non-MLA
Sarawak	Deputy Speaker	Idris Buang	Muara Tuang

=== Federal ministerial posts ===
Portfolio	Office Bearer	Constituency
Deputy Prime Minister Minister of Energy Transition and Water Transformation	Fadillah Yusof	Petra Jaya
Minister of Works	Alexander Nanta Linggi	Kapit
Minister of Women, Family and Community Development	Nancy Shukri	Santubong

Portfolio	Office Bearer	Constituency
Deputy Minister of Rural and Regional Development	Rubiah Wang	Kota Samarahan
Deputy Minister of Transport	Hasbi Habibollah	Limbang
Deputy Minister of Health	Hanifah Hajar Taib	Mukah
Deputy Minister of Foreign Affairs	Lukanisman Awang Sauni	Sibuti

== Election results ==
=== General election results ===
Election	Total seats won	Seats contested	Total votes	Share of votes	Outcome of election	Election leader
1964 (BARJASA)	5 / 159	12	appointed by Council Negri		▲5 seats; Governing coalition (Alliance Party)	Abdul Rahman Ya'kub
1964 (PANAS)	3 / 159	12	appointed by Council Negri		▲3 seats; Opposition, later Governing coalition (Alliance Party)	Abang Mustapha
1964 (Pesaka)	6 / 159	19	appointed by Council Negri		▲6 seats; Governing coalition (Alliance Party)	Jugah Barieng
1969 (Bumiputera)	5 / 144	11			▼3 seats; Governing coalition (Alliance Party)	Abdul Rahman Ya'kub
1969 (Pesaka)	2 / 144	8	30,765	1.28%	▼4 seats; Governing coalition (allied with Alliance Party)	Jugah Barieng
1974	8 / 144	7	83,722		▲1 seat; Governing coalition (Barisan Nasional)	Jugah Barieng
1978	8 / 154	7	52,222		; Governing coalition (Barisan Nasional)	Abdul Rahman Ya'kub
1982	8 / 154	8	28,700		; Governing coalition (Barisan Nasional)	Abdul Taib Mahmud
1986	8 / 177	5	48,367	1.02%	; Governing coalition (Barisan Nasional)	Abdul Taib Mahmud
1990	10 / 180	5	101,243		▲2 seats; Governing coalition (Barisan Nasional)	Abdul Taib Mahmud
1995	10 / 192	11	42,210		; Governing coalition (Barisan Nasional)	Abdul Taib Mahmud
1999	11 / 193	11	100,062		▲1 seat; Governing coalition (Barisan Nasional)	Abdul Taib Mahmud
2004	11 / 219	14	80,408	1.15%	; Governing coalition (Barisan Nasional)	Abdul Taib Mahmud
2008	14 / 222	14	131,243	1.65%	▲3 seats; Governing coalition (Barisan Nasional)	Abdul Taib Mahmud
2013	14 / 222	14	232,390	2.10%	; Governing coalition (Barisan Nasional)	Abdul Taib Mahmud
2018	13 / 222	14	220,479	1.83%	▼1 seat; Opposition coalition (Barisan Nasional), later Governing coalition (Gabungan Parti Sarawak)	Abang Johari Openg
2022	14 / 222	14	343,954	2.22%	▲1 seat; Governing coalition (Gabungan Parti Sarawak)	Abang Johari Openg

=== State election results ===
Sarawak State Legislative Assembly
Election	Votes		Seats			Position (Note: As part of electoral coalition.)	Status
Election	Count	%	Result	Won / contested	+/–	Position	Status
1969/1970 (Bumiputera)	33,900	13.5	11 / 48	11 / 21	▲11	1st (Sarawak Alliance)	Alliance–SUPP–Pesaka
1969/1970 (Pesaka)	34,281	13.7	8 / 48	8 / 35	▲8	4th	Alliance–SUPP–Pesaka
1974	89,534	34.3	18 / 48	18 / 32	▼1	1st (Barisan Nasional)	BN
1979	76,043	23.8	18 / 48	18 / 18	Steady	1st (Barisan Nasional)	BN
1983	77,694	21.5	19 / 48	19 / 20	▲1	1st (Barisan Nasional)	BN (Note: BN–PBDS–SNAP (1983–1984))
1987	95,816	21.2	14 / 48	14 / 23	▼5	1st (Barisan Nasional)	BN
1991	142,028	29.6	27 / 56	27 / 31	▲13	1st (Barisan Nasional)	BN
1996	93,795	25.7	29 / 62	29 / 30	▲2	1st (Barisan Nasional)	BN
2001	174,699	32.5	30 / 62	30 / 30	▲1	1st (Barisan Nasional)	BN
2006	160,331	29.5	35 / 71	35 / 35	▲5	1st (Barisan Nasional)	BN
2011	192,785	28.6	35 / 71	35 / 35	Steady	1st (Barisan Nasional)	BN (Note: BN–TERAS–UPP (2013–2016))
2016	235,800	30.9	40 / 82	40 / 40	▲5	1st (Barisan Nasional)	BN (2016–2018) (Note: BN–UPP (2016–2018))
2016	235,800	30.9	40 / 82	40 / 40	▲5	1st (Barisan Nasional)	GPS (2018–2021) (Note: GPS–PSB (2018–2019), GPS–PN (2020–2021))
2021	271,832	36.4	47 / 82	47 / 47	▲7	1st (Gabungan Parti Sarawak)	GPS (Note: GPS–PSB (2023–2024))

== Notes ==
- Chin, James. 2003: The Melanau-Malay Schism Erupts Again: Sarawak at the Polls. In: New Politics in Malaysia. Lok Kok Wah / Johan Saravanamuttu, Singapore: Institute of South East Asian Studies (ISBN 981-230-169-0), pp. 213–227
- James Chin. “The More Things Change, The More They Remain The Same”, in Chin Kin Wah & D. Singh (eds.) South East Asian Affairs 2004 (Singapore: Institute of South East Asian Studies, 2004)
- James Chin. “Autonomy: Politics in Sarawak” in Bridget Welsh (ed) Reflections: The Mahathir Years, (Washington DC: Johns Hopkins University Press, 2004) pp. 240–251
