= Julaihi Narawi =

Malaysian politician

Yang Berhormat Dato Seri Datuk Haji Julaihi Narawi MLA PGBK PNBS
- جولايهي ناراوي
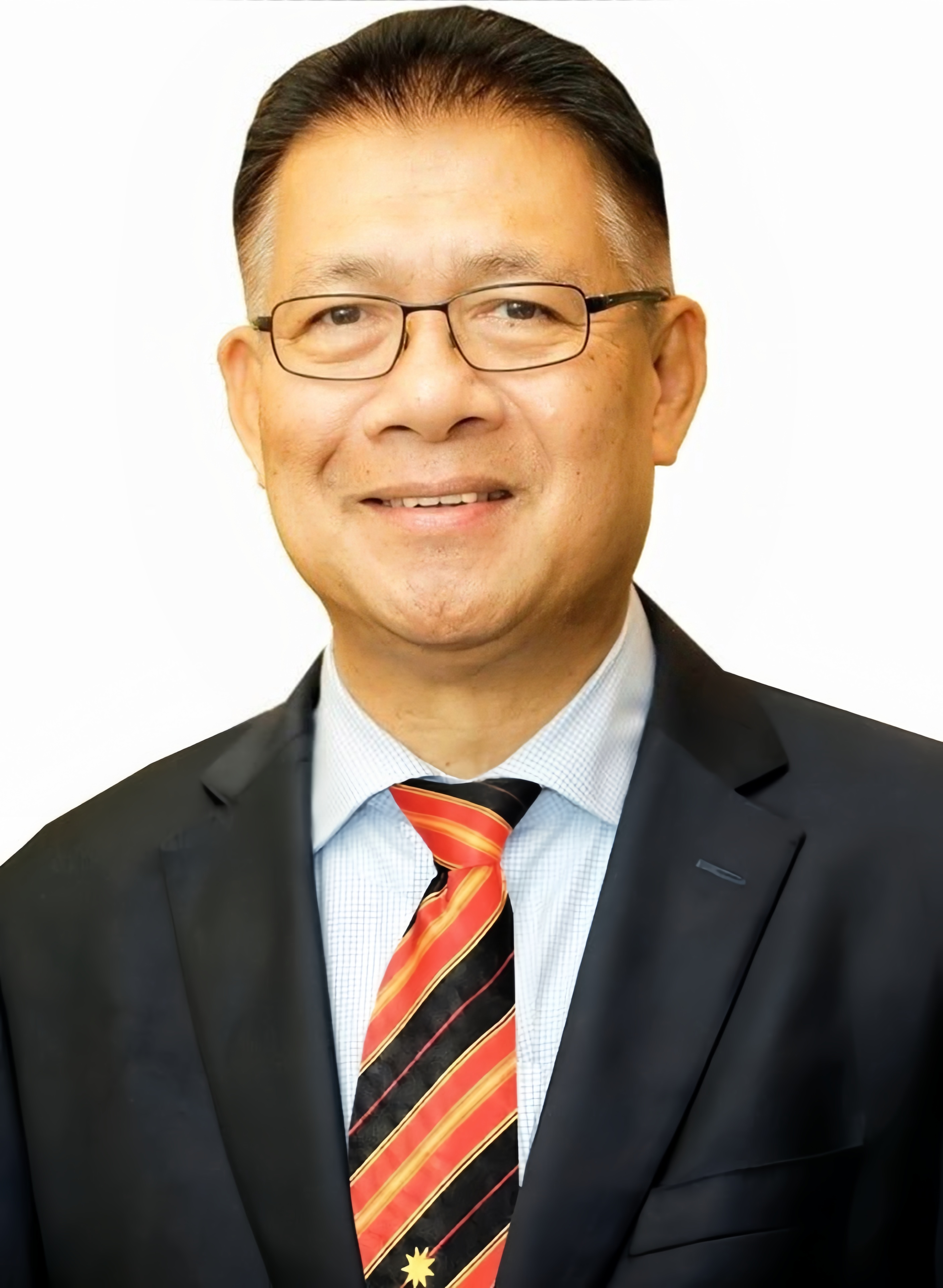

Minister for Utility and Telecommunication for Sarawak
- Incumbent
- Assumed office 2022
- Governor: Abdul Taib Mahmud (2022-2024); Wan Junaidi Tuanku Jaafar (since 2024)
- Premier: Abang Johari
- Preceded by: Position established

Member of the Sarawak State Legislative Assembly for Sebuyau
- Incumbent
- Assumed office 1991
- Preceded by: Constituency created

Personal details
- Born: Julaihi bin Narawi; 13 April 1961 (age 65) Sarawak
- Citizenship: Malaysian
- Party: PBB
- Other political affiliations: Barisan Nasional (till 2018); Gabungan Parti Sarawak (since 2018)
- Spouse: Saidiah Buji
- Occupation: Politician

Julaihi bin Narawi is a Malaysian politician from PBB. He has served as the Member of the Sarawak State Legislative Assembly for Sebuyau since 1991. He is also the Minister for Utility and Telecommunication for Sarawak since 2022.

== Politics ==
Julaihi has served as the Vice President of PBB.

== Election results ==
Sarawak State Legislative Assembly
Year	Constituency	Candidate	Votes	Pct.	Opponent(s)	Votes	Pct.	Ballots cast	Majority	Turnout
1991	N18 Sebuyau	Julaihi Narawi (PBB)	3,584	62.30%	Wel @ Maxwell Rojis (PBDS)	1,337	23.24%	5,862	2,247	73.19%
1991	N18 Sebuyau	Julaihi Narawi (PBB)	3,584	62.30%	Wan Fauzi Tku Ayubi (PERMAS)	748	13.00%	5,862	2,247	73.19%
1991	N18 Sebuyau	Julaihi Narawi (PBB)	3,584	62.30%	Jonathan Sumping Bayang (IND)	57	0.99%	5,862	2,247	73.19%
1991	N18 Sebuyau	Julaihi Narawi (PBB)	3,584	62.30%	Awg Azmi Awg Mat (IND)	27	0.47%	5,862	2,247	73.19%
1996	N20 Sebuyau	Julaihi Narawi (PBB)	Unopposed							
2001	N20 Sebuyau	Julaihi Narawi (PBB)	5,200	78.61%	Mohamad Akek (PKR)	1,074	16.24%	6,708	4,126	67.27%
2001	N20 Sebuyau	Julaihi Narawi (PBB)	5,200	78.61%	Dayang Saadiah Mat (IND)	341	5.15%	6,708	4,126	67.27%
2006	N22 Sebuyau	Julaihi Narawi (PBB)	3,748	74.25%	Mohamad Akek (PKR)	1,300	25.75%	5,138	2,448	68.06%
2011	N22 Sebuyau	Julaihi Narawi (PBB)	4,045	68.78%	Adam Ahid (PAS)	1,769	30.08%	5,979	2,276	79.35%
2011	N22 Sebuyau	Julaihi Narawi (PBB)	4,045	68.78%	Ali Semsu (IND)	67	1.14%	5,979	2,276	79.35%
2016	N27 Sebuyau	Julaihi Narawi (PBB)	4,531	69.88%	Wan Abdillah Wan Ahmad (PAS)	1,789	27.59%	6,620	2,742	73.22%
2016	N27 Sebuyau	Julaihi Narawi (PBB)	4,531	69.88%	Andrew Jain (AMANAH)	164	2.53%	6,620	2,742	73.22%
2021	N27 Sebuyau	Julaihi Narawi (PBB)	4,937	79.30%	Maxwell Rojis (AMANAH)	803	12.90%	6,388	4,134	68.20%
2021	N27 Sebuyau	Julaihi Narawi (PBB)	4,937	79.30%	Wan Chee Wan Mahjar (PBK)	486	7.81%	6,388	4,134	68.20%

== Honours ==
- Sarawak :
  - Commander of the Order of the Star of Hornbill Sarawak (PGBK) – Datuk (2013)
  - Knight Commander of the Most Exalted Order of the Star of Sarawak (PNBS) – Dato Sri (2023)
