= Mohamad Duri =

Malaysian politician

Yang Berhormat Haji Mohamad Duri MLA
- موهاماد دوري

Member of the Sarawak State Legislative Assembly for Kalaka
- Incumbent
- Assumed office 2021
- Preceded by: Abdul Wahab Aziz

Personal details
- Born: Mohamad bin Duri; 4 July 1969 (age 57) Kampung Tanjung Hilir, Saratok, Sarawak
- Citizenship: Malaysian
- Party: PBB
- Other political affiliations: Gabungan Parti Sarawak
- Spouse: Norlida Sharkawi
- Education: Universiti Teknologi Malaysia
- Occupation: Politician

Mohamad bin Duri is a Malaysian politician from PBB. He has served as the Member of the Sarawak State Legislative Assembly for Kalaka since 2021.

== Election results ==
Sarawak State Legislative Assembly
Year	Constituency	Candidate	Votes	Pct.	Opponent(s)	Votes	Pct.	Ballots cast	Majority	Turnout
2021	N38 Kalaka	Mohamad Duri (PBB)	3,893	72.43%	John Antau Linggang (PSB)	1,025	19.07%	5,358	2,868	68.78%
2021	N38 Kalaka	Mohamad Duri (PBB)	3,893	72.43%	Linang Chapum (PBK)	457	8.50%	5,358	2,868	68.78%
