= Kalaka (state constituency) =

State constituency in Sarawak, Malaysia

Kalaka (N38)
Sarawak constituency

State constituency
- Legislature: Sarawak State Legislative Assembly
MLA
Vacant
- Constituency created: 1968
- First contested: 1969
- Last contested: 2026

Kalaka is a state constituency in Sarawak, Malaysia, that has been represented in the Sarawak State Legislative Assembly since 1969.

The state constituency was created in the 1968 redistribution and is mandated to return a single member to the Sarawak State Legislative Assembly under the first past the post voting system.

== Demographics ==
Ethnic breakdown of Kalaka's electorate as of 2022
1. Malay-Muslim bumiputera (60.4%)
2. Sarawak bumiputera (28.2%)
3. Chinese (10.9%)
4. Other ethnicities (0.50%)

== History ==
As of 2020, Kalaka has a population of 12,768 people.

=== Polling districts ===
According to the gazette issued on 31 October 2022, the Kalaka constituency has a total of 6 polling districts.

State constituency	Polling Districts	Code	Location
Kalaka (N38)	Pelunga	205/38/01	SK Nyiar; RH Bundan Sg. Metong Roban; RH Siti Jubaidah Anak Lanchang Sg. Engkabang; SMK Kalaka Roban
Kalaka (N38)	Perpat	205/38/02	SK Lubok Nibong; SK Paloh; SK Perpat
Kalaka (N38)	Kaba	205/38/03	SK Haji Bollah Kaba; SK Kupang; SJK (C) Min Syn Saratok
Kalaka (N38)	Saratok	205/38/04	SK Abang Abdul Rahman Saratok
Kalaka (N38)	Tengalat	205/38/05	SK Entebu
Kalaka (N38)	Senyawan	205/38/06	SK Sg. Antu

=== Representation history ===
Members of the Legislative Assembly for Kalaka
Assembly	No	Years	Member	Party
Constituency created
8th	N21	1970-1974	Wan Alwi Tuanku Ibrahim	PESAKA
9th	N21	1974-1979	Ahmad Zaidi Adruce	BN (PBB)
10th	N21	1979-1983	Wan Yusof Tuanku Bujang	BN (PBB)
11th	N21	1983-1987	Wan Yusof Tuanku Bujang	BN (PBB)
12th	N21	1987-1991	Abang Yusuf Puteh	PERMAS
13th	N26	1991-1996	Abdul Wahab Aziz	BN (PBB)
14th	N28	1996-2001	Abdul Wahab Aziz	BN (PBB)
15th	N28	2001-2006	Abdul Wahab Aziz	BN (PBB)
16th	N33	2006-2011	Abdul Wahab Aziz	BN (PBB)
17th	N33	2011-2016	Abdul Wahab Aziz	BN (PBB)
18th	N38	2016-2018	Abdul Wahab Aziz	BN (PBB)
18th	N38	2018-2021	Abdul Wahab Aziz	GPS (PBB)
19th	N38	2021–2026	Mohamad Duri	GPS (PBB)

== Election results ==
Sarawak state election, 2026
Party	Candidate	Votes	%	∆%
GPS				▲
PH				▲
Total valid votes				
Total rejected ballots				
Unreturned ballots				
Turnout				
Registered electors				
Majority				

Sarawak state election, 2021
Party	Candidate	Votes	%	∆%
GPS	Mohamad Duri	3,893	72.43	▲72.43
PSB	John Antau Linggang	1,025	19.07	▲19.07
PBK	Linang Chapum	457	8.50	▲8.50
Total valid votes		5,375	100.00	
Total rejected ballots		137		
Unreturned ballots		26		
Turnout		5,538	68.78	▼2.83
Registered electors		8,052		
Majority		2,868	53.36	▼1.78
GPS gain from BN		Swing		?
Source(s) https://lom.agc.gov.my/ilims/upload/portal/akta/outputp/1718688/PUB687.pdf

Sarawak state election, 2016
Party	Candidate	Votes	%	∆%
BN	Abdul Wahab Aziz	3,988	77.57	▲9.30
PKR	Jemat Panjang	1,153	22.43	▲7.34
Total valid votes		5,141	100.00	
Total rejected ballots		82		
Unreturned ballots		24		
Turnout		5,247	71.61	▼0.40
Registered electors		7,327		
Majority		2,835	55.14	▲3.50
BN hold		Swing		
Source(s) "Federal Government Gazette - Notice of Contested Election, State Legislative Assembly of the State of Sarawak [P.U. (B) 190/2016]" (PDF). Attorney General's Chambers of Malaysia. 25 April 2016. Archived from the original (PDF) on 2017-06-12. "Senarai Calon yang Disahkan Layak Bertanding Pilihan Raya Dewan Undangan Negeri ke-11". Election Commission of Malaysia. 25 April 2016. Archived from the original on 25 April 2016.

Sarawak state election, 2011
Party	Candidate	Votes	%	∆%
BN	Abdul Wahab Aziz	6,835	68.27	▼15.18
Independent	Ismail Hussain	1,665	16.63	▲16.63
PKR	Mohd Yahya Abdullah	1,511	15.09	▼1.46
Total valid votes		10,011	100.00	
Total rejected ballots		120		
Unreturned ballots		71		
Turnout		10,202	72.01	▲4.62
Registered electors		14,167		
Majority		5,170	51.64	▼15.25
BN hold		Swing		
Source(s) "Federal Government Gazette - Results of Contested Election and Statements of the Poll after the Official Addition of Votes Sarawak [P.U. (B) 245/2011]" (PDF). Attorney General's Chambers of Malaysia. 29 April 2011.

Sarawak state election, 2006
Party	Candidate	Votes	%	∆%
BN	Abdul Wahab Aziz	7,396	83.45	▼0.91
PKR	Jini Sahini	1,467	16.55	▲3.46
Total valid votes		8,863	100.00	
Total rejected ballots		136		
Unreturned ballots		18		
Turnout		9,017	67.39	▼3.14
Registered electors		13,379		
Majority		5,929	66.89	▼4.37
BN hold		Swing		

Sarawak state election, 2001
Party	Candidate	Votes	%	∆%
BN	Abdul Wahab Aziz	7,692	84.36	▲0.49
PKR	Basmawi Mahali	1,194	13.09	▼1.35
Independent	Idris Bohari	232	2.54	▲2.54
Total valid votes		9,118	100.00	
Total rejected ballots		112		
Unreturned ballots		14		
Turnout		9,244	70.53	▼8.79
Registered electors		13,106		
Majority		6,498	71.26	▲1.83
BN hold		Swing		

Sarawak state election, 1996
Party	Candidate	Votes	%	∆%
On the nomination day, Abdul Wahab Aziz won uncontested.
BN	Abdul Wahab Aziz			
Total valid votes			100.00	
Total rejected ballots				
Unreturned ballots				
Turnout				
Registered electors		12,865		
Majority				
BN hold		Swing		

Sarawak state election, 1991
Party	Candidate	Votes	%	∆%
BN	Abdul Wahab Aziz	8,067	83.87	▲33.40
PERMAS	Mohd Nasar Badron	1,389	14.44	▼36.09
NEGARA	Senawi Sulaiman	163	1.69	▲1.69
Total valid votes		9,619	100.00	
Total rejected ballots		97		
Unreturned ballots		147		
Turnout		9,863	79.32	▼3.52
Registered electors		12,435		
Majority		6,678	69.43	▲68.37
BN gain from PERMAS		Swing		?

Sarawak state election, 1987
Party	Candidate	Votes	%	∆%
PERMAS	Abang Yusuf Puteh	3,685	50.53	▲50.53
BN	Abdul Wahab Aziz	3,608	49.47	▼12.07
Total valid votes		7,293	100.00	
Total rejected ballots		83		
Unreturned ballots		0		
Turnout		7,376	82.84	▲5.51
Registered electors		8,904		
Majority		77	1.06	▼43.52
PERMAS gain from BN		Swing		?

Sarawak state election, 1983
Party	Candidate	Votes	%	∆%
BN	Wan Yusof Tuanku Bujang	3,828	61.54	▼16.77
Independent	Mohd. Rambli Omar	1,055	16.96	▲16.96
Independent	Jong Nam Hin	690	11.09	▲11.09
Independent	Jong Thai Bee	528	8.49	▲8.49
Independent	Othman Kawi	120	1.93	▲1.93
Total valid votes		6,221	100.00	
Total rejected ballots		137		
Unreturned ballots		0		
Turnout		6,358	77.33	▼1.85
Registered electors		8,222		
Majority		2,773	44.58	▼12.05
BN hold		Swing		

Sarawak state election, 1979
Party	Candidate	Votes	%	∆%
BN	Wan Yusof Tuanku Bujang	4,489	78.31	▲15.56
Parti Anak Jati Sarawak	Suib Samik	1,243	21.69	▲21.69
Total valid votes		5,732	100.00	
Total rejected ballots		81		
Unreturned ballots		0		
Turnout		5,813	79.18	▼6.46
Registered electors		7,341		
Majority		3,246	56.63	▲31.14
BN hold		Swing		

Sarawak state election, 1974
Party	Candidate	Votes	%	∆%
BN	Ahmad Zaidi Adruce	3,163	62.75	▲32.28
SNAP	Senawi Sulaiman	1,878	37.25	▲12.04
Total valid votes		5,041	100.00	
Total rejected ballots		337		
Unreturned ballots		0		
Turnout		5,378	85.64	▼1.75
Registered electors		6,280		
Majority		1,285	25.49	▲13.45
BN gain from PESAKA		Swing		?

Sarawak state election, 1969
Party	Candidate	Votes	%
PESAKA	Wan Alwi Tuanku Ibrahim	1,963	42.52
PBB	Kadir Hassan	1,407	30.47
SNAP	William Lampas	1,164	25.21
Independent	Jais Sejin	83	1.80
Total valid votes		4,617	100.00
Total rejected ballots		263	
Unreturned ballots		0	
Turnout		4,880	87.39
Registered electors		5,584	
Majority		556	12.04
This was a new constituency created.
