= Abdullah Saidol =

Malaysian politician

Yang Berhormat Datuk Haji Abdullah Saidol MLA PGBK KMN
- عبدالله سايدول

Deputy Minister in the Premier's Department for Corporate Affairs and UKAS
- Incumbent
- Assumed office 2022
- Governor: Abdul Taib Mahmud (2022-2024); Wan Junaidi Tuanku Jaafar (since 2024)
- Premier: Abang Johari
- Preceded by: Position established

Member of the Sarawak State Legislative Assembly for Semop
- Incumbent
- Assumed office 2011
- Preceded by: Mohamad Asfia Awang Nassar

Personal details
- Born: Abdullah bin Saidol Sarawak
- Citizenship: Malaysian
- Party: PBB
- Other political affiliations: Barisan Nasional (till 2018); Gabungan Parti Sarawak (since 2018)
- Spouse: Nora Ashikin Ibrahim
- Occupation: Politician

Abdullah bin Saidol is a Malaysian politician from PBB. He has served as the Member of the Sarawak State Legislative Assembly for Semop since 2011. He is also the Sarawak Deputy Minister in the Premier's Department for Corporate Affairs and UKAS.

== Election results ==
Sarawak State Legislative Assembly
Year	Constituency	Candidate	Votes	Pct.	Opponent(s)	Votes	Pct.	Ballots cast	Majority	Turnout
2011	N36 Semop	Abdullah Saidol (PBB)	4,814	83.04%	Ong Chung Siew (PKR)	564	9.73%	5,917	4,250	66.55%
2011	N36 Semop	Abdullah Saidol (PBB)	4,814	83.04%	Ajiji Fauzan (IND)	419	7.23%	5,917	4,250	66.55%
2016	N42 Semop	Abdullah Saidol (PBB)	5,290	85.77%	Mohamad Fadillah Sabali (AMANAH)	878	14.23%	6,331	4,412	65.83%
2021	N42 Semop	Abdullah Saidol (PBB)	4,338	64.58%	Abdul Raafidin Majidi (PSB)	1,180	17.57%	6,862	3,158	66.64%
2021	N42 Semop	Abdullah Saidol (PBB)	4,338	64.58%	Mohd Adenan Zulkepli (IND)	811	12.07%	6,862	3,158	66.64%
2021	N42 Semop	Abdullah Saidol (PBB)	4,338	64.58%	Mohamad Fadillah Sabali (AMANAH)	270	4.02%	6,862	3,158	66.64%
2021	N42 Semop	Abdullah Saidol (PBB)	4,338	64.58%	Jenny Wong Khing Ling (PBK)	119	1.76%	6,862	3,158	66.64%

== Honours ==
- Malaysia :
  - Officer of the Order of the Defender of the Realm (KMN) (2017)
- Sarawak :
  - Commander of the Order of the Star of Hornbill Sarawak (PGBK) – Datuk (2021)
