= Hazland Abang Hipni =

Malaysian politician

Yang Berhormat Datuk Haji Hazland Abang Hipni MLA PGBK
- هازلاند ابڠ هيڤني

Deputy Minister for Energy and Environmental Sustainability
- Incumbent
- Assumed office 2022
- Governor: Abdul Taib Mahmud (2022-2024); Wan Junaidi Tuanku Jaafar (since 2024)
- Premier: Abang Johari
- Preceded by: Position established

Member of the Sarawak State Legislative Assembly for Demak Laut
- Incumbent
- Assumed office 2011
- Preceded by: Abang Draup Zamahari Abang Zen

Personal details
- Born: Hazland bin Abang Hipni; 2 April 1965 (age 61) Sarawak
- Citizenship: Malaysian
- Party: PBB
- Other political affiliations: Barisan Nasional (till 2018); Gabungan Parti Sarawak (since 2018)
- Spouse: Dayang Halimah Abang Paul
- Relations: Azizul Annuar Adenan (Son in-law)
- Education: Universiti Malaya
- Occupation: Politician
- Profession: Medical doctor

Hazland bin Abang Hipni is a Malaysian politician from PBB. He has served as the Member of the Sarawak State Legislative Assembly for Demak Laut since 2021. He is also the Deputy Minister for Energy and Environmental Sustainability for Sarawak.

== Election results ==
Sarawak State Legislative Assembly
Year	Constituency	Candidate	Votes	Pct.	Opponent(s)	Votes	Pct.	Ballots cast	Majority	Turnout
2011	N05 Demak Laut	Hazland Abang Hipni (PBB)	5,522	75.73%	Ali Hossen Abang (PKR)	1,770	24.27%	7,403	3,752	70.93%
2016	N05 Demak Laut	Hazland Abang Hipni (PBB)	8,539	88.07%	Mohammad Fidzuan Zaidi (AMANAH)	1,157	11.93%	9,879	7,382	71.43%
2021	N05 Demak Laut	Hazland Abang Hipni (PBB)	7,636	78.25%	Yatika Jelani (PSB)	1,237	12.68%	10,024	6,399	67.67%
2021	N05 Demak Laut	Hazland Abang Hipni (PBB)	7,636	78.25%	Khairul Ahmad (IND)	674	6.91%	10,024	6,399	67.67%
2021	N05 Demak Laut	Hazland Abang Hipni (PBB)	7,636	78.25%	Jen Peli (AMANAH)	212	2.17%	10,024	6,399	67.67%

== Honours ==
- Sarawak :
  - Commander of the Order of the Star of Hornbill Sarawak (PGBK) – Datuk (2023)
