= Fazzrudin Abdul Rahman =

Malaysian politician

Yang Berhormat Dato Fazzrudin Abdul Rahman MLA PSBS
- فاززرودين ابدول رحمن

Member of the Sarawak State Legislative Assembly for Tupong
- Incumbent
- Assumed office 2016
- Preceded by: Daud Abdul Rahman

Personal details
- Born: Fazzrudin bin Abdul Rahman; 15 December 1975 (age 50) Kuching, Sarawak
- Citizenship: Malaysian
- Party: PBB
- Other political affiliations: Barisan Nasional (till 2018); Gabungan Parti Sarawak (since 2018)
- Spouse: Norazlin Sapawi
- Education: SMK St. Joseph
- Occupation: Politician

Fazzrudin bin Abdul Rahman is a Malaysian politician from PBB. He has served as the Member of the Sarawak State Legislative Assembly for Tupong since 2021. He is also the Deputy Secretary General of PBB.

== Politics ==
Fazzrudin was the Political Secretary for Fadillah Yusof.

== Election results ==
Sarawak State Legislative Assembly
Year	Constituency	Candidate	Votes	Pct.	Opponent(s)	Votes	Pct.	Ballots cast	Majority	Turnout
2016	N06 Tupong	Fazzrudin Abdul Rahman (PBB)	10,942	79.12%	Nurhanim Hanna Mokhsen (PKR)	2,887	20.88%	14,061	8,055	65.40%
2021	N06 Tupong	Fazzrudin Abdul Rahman (PBB)	12,544	85.25%	Ahmad Nazib Johari (PKR)	1,335	9.07%	14,971	11,209	57.57%
2021	N06 Tupong	Fazzrudin Abdul Rahman (PBB)	12,544	85.25%	Chan Haong Yen (PBK)	836	5.68%	14,971	11,209	57.57%

== Honours ==
- Sarawak:
  - Commander of the Most Exalted Order of the Star of Sarawak (PSBS) – Dato (2024)
