= Serdeng =

Sarawak constituency

Defunct state constituency
- Legislature: Sarawak State Legislative Assembly
- Constituency created: 1987
- Constituency abolished: 2006
- First contested: 1991
- Last contested: 2001

Serdeng was a state constituency in Sarawak, Malaysia, that was represented in the Sarawak State Legislative Assembly from 1991 to 2006.

The state constituency was created in the 1987 redistribution and was mandated to return a single member to the Sarawak State Legislative Assembly under the first past the post voting system.

== History ==
It was abolished in 2006 after it was redistributed.

=== Representation history ===
Members of the Legislative Assembly for Serdeng
Assembly	No	Years	Member	Party
Constituency split from Kuala Rajang
13th	N29	1991-1996	Mohamad Asfia Awang Nassar	BN (PBB)
14th	N31	1996-2001	Mohamad Asfia Awang Nassar	BN (PBB)
15th	N31	2001-2006	Mohamad Asfia Awang Nassar	BN (PBB)
Constituency abolished, renamed to Semop

== Election results ==
Sarawak state election, 2001: Serdeng
Party	Candidate	Votes	%	∆%
BN	Mohamad Asfia Awang Nassar	4,255	76.10	▲2.65
Independent	Abdul Kadir Madahan @ Bakong	1,336	23.90	▲21.28
Total valid votes		5,591	100.00	
Total rejected ballots		121		
Unreturned ballots		3		
Turnout		5,715	70.46	▼0.98
Registered electors		8,111		
Majority		2,919	52.21	▲2.70
Source(s) Election Commission of Malaysia.

Sarawak state election, 1996: Serdeng
Party	Candidate	Votes	%	∆%
BN	Mohamad Asfia Awang Nassar	4,075	73.45	▲16.78
Independent	Zaiton Nor Mohamed	1,328	23.94	▲11.24
BEBAS	Ibrahim bin Taha	145	2.61	▼10.09
Total valid votes		5,548	100.00	
Total rejected ballots		108		
Unreturned ballots		4		
Turnout		5,660	71.44	▼4.03
Registered electors		7,923		
Majority		2,747	49.51	▲21.72
BN hold		Swing		
Source(s) Election Commission of Malaysia.

Sarawak state election, 1991: Serdeng
Party	Candidate	Votes	%
BN	Mohamad Asfia Awang Nassar	3,079	56.67
PERMAS	Awg. Ahmad	1,569	28.88
Independent	Abu Seman Mat	690	12.70
DAP	Yosof Basri	58	1.07
NEGARA	Ali Hassan Tajol	37	0.68
Total valid votes		5,433	100.00
Total rejected ballots		91	
Unreturned ballots		3	
Turnout		5,527	75.46
Registered electors		7,324	
Majority		1,510	27.79
This was a new constituency created.
Source(s) Berita Minggu.
