= Nuing Jeluing =

Malaysian politician

Yang Berbahagia Dato Nuing Jeluing PSBS PBS KMN

Senator Elected by the Sarawak State Legislative Assembly
- In office 11 December 2017 – 10 December 2023 Serving with Zaiedi Suhaili (2017–2019); Ahmad Ibrahim (2019–2023)
- Monarchs: Muhammad V (2017–2019); Abdullah (2019–2023)
- Prime Minister: Najib Razak (2017–2018); Mahathir Mohamad (2018–2020); Muhyiddin Yassin (2020–2021); Ismail Sabri Yaakob (2021–2022); Anwar Ibrahim (2022–2023)
- Preceded by: Lihan Jok
- Succeeded by: Michael Mujah Lihan

Personal details
- Born: Nuing anak Jeluing; 24 January 1952 (age 74) Crown Colony of Sarawak
- Party: Parti Pesaka Bumiputera Bersatu (PBB)
- Other political affiliations: Barisan Nasional (BN) (until 2018); Gabungan Parti Sarawak (GPS) (since 2018)
- Education: University of Malaya
- Occupation: Politician
- Profession: Physician

Nuing anak Jeluing is a Malaysian politician and physician who had served as a Senator from December 2017 to December 2023 representing the Sarawak State Legislative Assembly. He is a member of the Parti Pesaka Bumiputera Bersatu (PBB), a component party of the Gabungan Parti Sarawak (GPS) coalition and formerly Barisan Nasional (BN).

He was replaced by Michael Mujah Lihan from the same party to represent in the Dewan Negara.

His private clinic, Klinik Dr. Nuing is located in the Saberkas Commercial Centre, Miri, Sarawak.

== Honours ==
- Malaysia :
  - Officer of the Order of the Defender of the Realm (KMN) (2015)
- Sarawak :
  - Commander of the Most Exalted Order of the Star of Sarawak (PSBS) – Dato (2021)
  - Officer of the Most Exalted Order of the Star of Sarawak (PBS) (2005)
