= Ripin Lamat =

Malaysian politician

Yang Berhormat Datuk Ripin Lamat PGBK JBK KMN AMN MLA

Member of the Sarawak State Legislative Assembly for Lambir
- Incumbent
- Assumed office 2011
- Preceded by: Swin Jema'ah @ Aidan Wing

Personal details
- Born: Ripin bin Lamat Sarawak
- Citizenship: Malaysian
- Party: PBB
- Other political affiliations: Barisan Nasional (till 2018); Gabungan Parti Sarawak (since 2018)
- Occupation: Politician

Ripin bin Lamat is a Malaysian politician from PBB. He has served as the Member of the Sarawak State Legislative Assembly for Lambir since 2011.

== Election results ==
Sarawak State Legislative Assembly
Year	Constituency	Candidate	Votes	Pct.	Opponent(s)	Votes	Pct.	Ballots cast	Majority	Turnout
2011	N62 Lambir	Ripin Lamat (PBB)	4,625	54.92%	Zolhaidah Suboh (PKR)	3,104	36.86%	8,588	1,521	60.72%
2011	N62 Lambir	Ripin Lamat (PBB)	4,625	54.92%	Johari Bujang (SNAP)	693	8.22%	8,588	1,521	60.72%
2016	N72 Lambir	Ripin Lamat (PBB)	7,503	68.66%	Mohdar Ismail (PKR)	2,596	23.76%	11,148	4,907	63.58%
2016	N72 Lambir	Ripin Lamat (PBB)	7,503	68.66%	Arif Paijo (PAS)	829	7.59%	11,148	4,907	63.58%
2021	N72 Lambir	Ripin Lamat (PBB)	6,860	68.02%	Lila Mohamad (PSB)	1,298	12.87%	10,255	5,562	51.51%
2021	N72 Lambir	Ripin Lamat (PBB)	6,860	68.02%	Zulhaidah Suboh (PKR)	1,139	11.29%	10,255	5,562	51.51%
2021	N72 Lambir	Ripin Lamat (PBB)	6,860	68.02%	Dyanne Oshield Nickson (PBK)	789	7.82%	10,255	5,562	51.51%

== Honours ==
- Malaysia
  - Officer of the Order of the Defender of the Realm (KMN) (2017)
  - Member of the Order of the Defender of the Realm (AMN) (2014)
- Sarawak
  - Commander of the Order of the Star of Hornbill Sarawak (PGBK) – Datuk (2023)
  - Companion of the Order of the Star of Hornbill Sarawak (JBK) (2017)
