= Mohamad Asfia Awang Nassar =

Malaysian politician, current Speaker of Sarawak State Legislative Assembly

Yang Berhormat Tan Sri Datuk Amar Mohamad Asfia Awang Nassar PSM DA SIMP PNBS DSAP DIMP PBK PPC
- محمد أصفية أواڠ نصّار
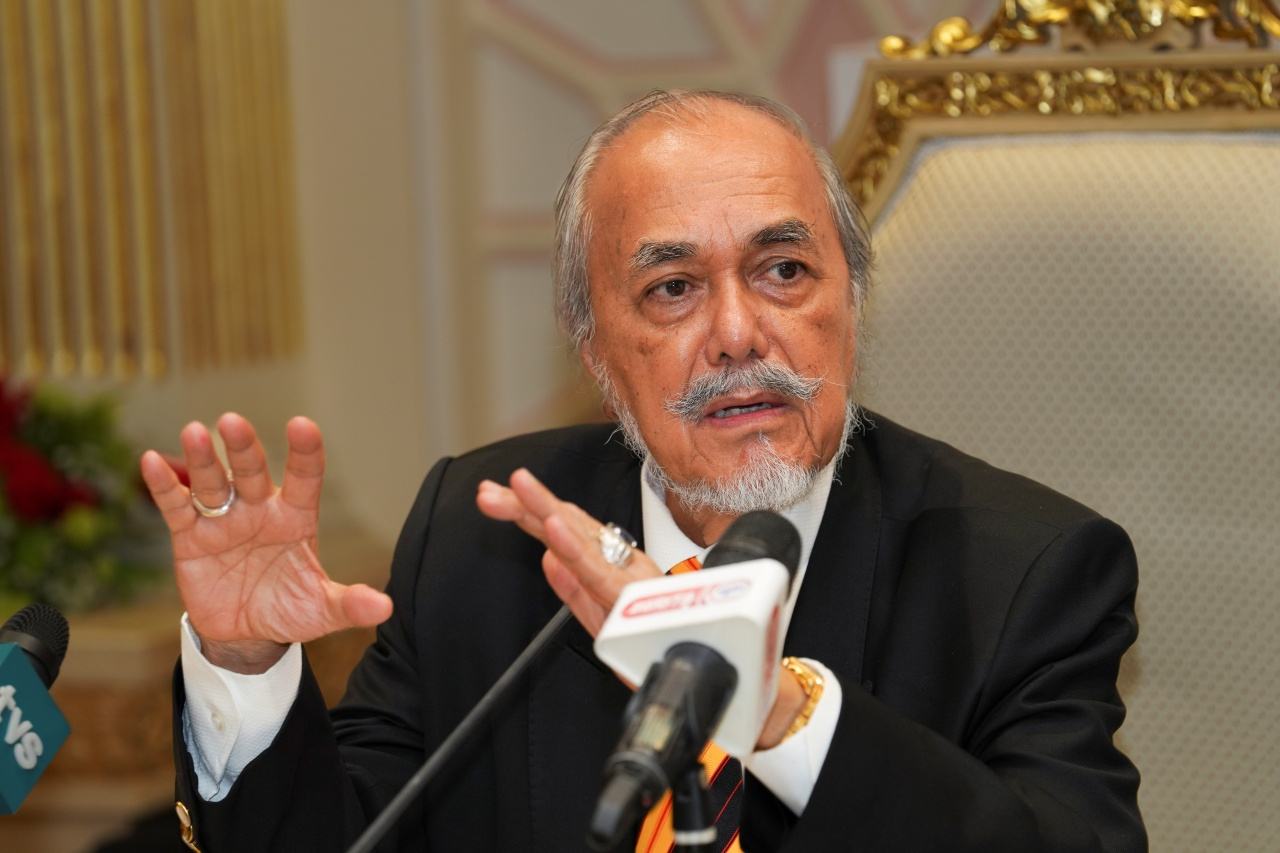
- Mohamad Asfia in 2023

Acting Yang di-Pertua Negeri of Sarawak
- In office 16 August 2023 – 17 September 2023
- Premier: Abang Johari Openg
- In office 1 December 2019 – 11 January 2020
- Chief Minister: Abang Johari Openg
- In office 28 November 2018 – 6 January 2019
- Chief Minister: Abang Johari Openg
- In office 1 December 2016 – 4 January 2017
- Chief Minister: Adenan Satem
- In office 11 December 2014 – 9 January 2015
- Chief Minister: Adenan Satem
- In office 29 December 2011 – 10 February 2012
- Chief Minister: Abdul Taib Mahmud

Speaker of the Sarawak State Legislative Assembly
- Incumbent
- Assumed office 15 January 2000
- Governor: See list: Ahmad Zaidi Adruce Abang Muhammad Salahuddin Abdul Taib Mahmud Wan Junaidi Tuanku Jaafar
- Deputy: Gerawat Gala (2006–2022); Idris Buang (since 2022)
- Premier: Abang Johari Openg
- Chief Minister: Abdul Taib Mahmud; Adenan Satem; Abang Johari Openg
- Preceded by: Song Swee Guan

Deputy Speaker of the Sarawak State Legislative Assembly
- In office 1995–2000
- Governor: Ahmad Zaidi Adruce
- Chief Minister: Abdul Taib Mahmud

Chairperson of Parti Pesaka Bumiputera Bersatu
- Incumbent
- Assumed office 2002
- President: Abang Johari Openg

Member of the Sarawak State Legislative Assembly for Semop
- In office 20 May 2006 – 16 April 2011
- Preceded by: Constituency established
- Succeeded by: Abdullah Saidol
- Majority: 3,226 (2006)

Member of the Sarawak State Legislative Assembly for Serdeng
- In office 1991–2006
- Preceded by: Constituency established
- Succeeded by: Constituency abolished

Member of the Sarawak State Legislative Assembly for Kuala Rajang
- In office 1979–1983
- Preceded by: Abdul Rahman Ya'kub
- Succeeded by: Saidi Olia

Personal details
- Born: 8 October 1947 (age 78)
- Party: Parti Pesaka Bumiputera Bersatu
- Other political affiliations: Barisan Nasional (until 2018); Gabungan Parti Sarawak (from 2018)
- Spouse: Fatimah Mohamad Iskandar
- Education: University of Leeds
- Occupation: Politician
- Profession: Lawyer

Mohamad Asfia bin Awang Nassar (born 8 October 1947) is a Malaysian politician who has served as the Speaker of Sarawak State Legislative Assembly since 15 January 2000 and previously was the Deputy Speaker from 1995 to 2000. He holds the record for being the longest serving Speaker in the Commonwealth. He had served as the Acting Yang di-Pertua Negeri of Sarawak from 1 December 2019 to 11 January 2020 and again from 16 August 2023 to 17 September 2023. He was also the Member of the Sarawak State Legislative Assembly (MLA) for Serdeng and Semop between 1991 and 2011 and the MLA for Kuala Rajang between 1979 and 1983.

In August 2023, Mohamad Asfia was appointed as Acting Yang di-Pertua Negeri of Sarawak following the absence of Tun Abdul Taib Mahmud who was in the process of recovering his health abroad. Taib was previously in Turkiye for a holiday before facing health problems and undergoing a surgical procedure. He taken his oath in The Astana, Petra Jaya. Among present to witness the ceremony was the Premier of Sarawak, Tan Sri Abang Johari Tun Openg and the Kuching High Court Judge, Justice Dato Dr. Alwi Abdul Wahab.

== Election results ==
Sarawak State Legislative Assembly
Year	Constituency	Candidate	Votes	Pct	Opponent(s)	Votes	Pct	Ballots cast	Majority	Turnout
1979	N23 Kuala Rajang	Mohamad Asfia Awang Nassar (PBB)		76.29%	(PAJAR)		10.92%			
1979	N23 Kuala Rajang	Mohamad Asfia Awang Nassar (PBB)		76.29%	(IND)					
1979	N23 Kuala Rajang	Mohamad Asfia Awang Nassar (PBB)		76.29%	(IND)					
1991	N29 Serdeng	Mohamad Asfia Awang Nassar (PBB)	3,079	56.67%	Awg. Ahmad (PERMAS)	1,569	28.88%	5,527	1,510	75.46%
1991	N29 Serdeng	Mohamad Asfia Awang Nassar (PBB)	3,079	56.67%	Abu Seman Mat (IND)	690	12.70%	5,527	1,510	75.46%
1991	N29 Serdeng	Mohamad Asfia Awang Nassar (PBB)	3,079	56.67%	Yosof Basri (DAP)	58	1.07%	5,527	1,510	75.46%
1991	N29 Serdeng	Mohamad Asfia Awang Nassar (PBB)	3,079	56.67%	Ali Hassan Tajol (NEGARA)	37	0.68%	5,527	1,510	75.46%
1996	N31 Serdeng	Mohamad Asfia Awang Nassar (PBB)	4,075	73.45%	Zaiton Nor Mohamed (IND)	1,328	23.94%	5,660	2,747	71.44%
1996	N31 Serdeng	Mohamad Asfia Awang Nassar (PBB)	4,075	73.45%	Ibrahim Taha (IND)	145	2.61%	5,660	2,747	71.44%
2001	N31 Serdeng	Mohamad Asfia Awang Nassar (PBB)	4,255	76.10%	Abdul Kadir Madahan (IND)	1,336	23.90%	5,715	2,919	70.46%
2006	N36 Semop	Mohamad Asfia Awang Nassar (PBB)	4,479	78.14%	Noh @ Sa'bi (KeADILan)	1,253	21.86%	5,854	3,226	63.89%

== Honours ==
- Malaysia
  - Commander of the Order of Loyalty to the Crown of Malaysia (PSM) – Tan Sri (2021)
- Pahang
  - Grand Knight of the Order of the Crown of Pahang (SIMP) – formerly Dato', now Dato' Indera (2004)
- Sarawak
  - Knight Commander of the Order of the Star of Hornbill Sarawak (DA) – Datuk Amar (2011)
  - Knight Commander of the Most Exalted Order of the Star of Sarawak (PNBS) – Dato Sri (2003)
  - Officer of the Order of the Star of Hornbill Sarawak (PBK) (1989)
  - Gold Medal of the Sarawak Independence Diamond Jubilee Medal (2023)
