= Lambir (state constituency) =

Electoral district in Sarawak, Malaysia

Lambir (N72)
Sarawak constituency

State constituency
- Legislature: Sarawak State Legislative Assembly
MLA
Vacant
- Constituency created: 1987
- First contested: 1991
- Last contested: 2026

Lambir is a state constituency in Sarawak, Malaysia, that has been represented in the Sarawak State Legislative Assembly since 1991.

The state constituency was created in the 1987 redistribution and is mandated to return a single member to the Sarawak State Legislative Assembly under the first past the post voting system.

== Demographics ==
Ethnic breakdown of Lambir's electorate as of 2022
1. Sarawak bumiputera (44.2%)
2. Chinese (28.4%)
3. Malay-Muslim bumiputera (26.0%)
4. Other ethnicities (1.40%)

== History ==
As of 2020, Lambir has a population of 48,876 people.

=== Polling districts ===
According to the gazette issued on 31 October 2022, the Lambir constituency has a total of 7 polling districts.

State constituency	Polling Districts	Code	Location
Lambir (N72)	Peninjau	218/72/01	SMK Luar Bandar Bekenu Sibuti; RH Duat Sg. Kelintang; RH James Biri; Dewan Pusat Pembangunan Kemahiran Sarawak (PPKS); SK Kelapa Sawit No. 2 Bukit Peninjau; RH Lagan
Lambir (N72)	Satap	218/72/02	SK Keluru Tengah Sibuti; SK Tawakal Satap Sibuti
Lambir (N72)	Bakam	218/72/03	SJK (C) Chung Hua Sg. Rakit Bakam; SK Kpg. Bakam Miri; SJK (C) Tukau
Lambir (N72)	Lambir	218/72/04	SK Lambir Village Miri
Lambir (N72)	Airport	218/72/05	SMK Riam Taman Tunku Miri; SMK Taman Tunku
Lambir (N72)	Tukau	218/72/06	SMK Agama
Lambir (N72)	RAMD	218/72/07	SMK Riam

=== Representation history ===
Members of the Legislative Assembly for Lambir
Assembly	No	Years	Member	Party
Constituency created from Subis and Miri
13th	N51	1991-1996	Usop Wahab	BN (PBB)
14th	N55	1996-2001	Swin Jema'ah @ Aidan Wing	BN (PBB)
15th	N55	2001-2006	Swin Jema'ah @ Aidan Wing	BN (PBB)
16th	N66	2006-2011	Swin Jema'ah @ Aidan Wing	BN (PBB)
17th	N66	2011-2016	Ripin Lamat	BN (PBB)
18th	N72	2016-2018	Ripin Lamat	BN (PBB)
18th	N72	2018-2021	Ripin Lamat	GPS (PBB)
19th	N72	2021–2026	Ripin Lamat	GPS (PBB)

== Election results ==
Sarawak state election, 2026
Party	Candidate	Votes	%	∆%
GPS				▲
PH				▲
Total valid votes				
Total rejected ballots				
Unreturned ballots				
Turnout				
Registered electors				
Majority				

Sarawak state election, 2021
Party	Candidate	Votes	%	∆%
GPS	Ripin Lamat	6,860	68.02	▲68.02
PSB	Lila Mohamad	1,298	12.87	▲12.87
PKR	Zulhaidah Suboh	1,139	11.29	▲11.29
PBK	Dyanne Oshield Nickson	789	7.82	▲7.82
Total valid votes		10,086	100.00	
Total rejected ballots		109		
Unreturned ballots		60		
Turnout		10,255	51.51	▼12.07
Registered electors		19,907		
Majority		5,562	55.15	▲10.25
GPS gain from BN		Swing		?
Source(s) https://lom.agc.gov.my/ilims/upload/portal/akta/outputp/1718688/PUB687.pdf

Sarawak state election, 2016
Party	Candidate	Votes	%	∆%
BN	Ripin Lamat	7,503	68.66	▲13.74
PKR	Mohdar Ismail	2,596	23.76	▼13.10
PAS	Arif Paijo	829	7.59	▲7.59
Total valid votes		10,928	100.00	
Total rejected ballots		205		
Unreturned ballots		15		
Turnout		11,148	63.58	▼2.86
Registered electors		17,533		
Majority		4,907	44.90	▲26.84
BN hold		Swing		
Source(s) "Federal Government Gazette - Notice of Contested Election, State Legislative Assembly of the State of Sarawak [P.U. (B) 190/2016]" (PDF). Attorney General's Chambers of Malaysia. 25 April 2016. Archived from the original (PDF) on 2017-06-12. "Senarai Calon yang Disahkan Layak Bertanding Pilihan Raya Dewan Undangan Negeri ke-11". Election Commission of Malaysia. 25 April 2016. Archived from the original on 25 April 2016.

Sarawak state election, 2011
Party	Candidate	Votes	%	∆%
BN	Ripin Lamat	4,625	54.92	▼19.39
PKR	Zolhaidah Suboh	3,104	36.86	▲11.17
SNAP	Johari Bujang	693	8.22	▲8.22
Total valid votes		8,422	100.00	
Total rejected ballots		143		
Unreturned ballots		23		
Turnout		8,588	60.72	▲7.95
Registered electors		14,144		
Majority		1,521	18.06	▼30.57
BN hold		Swing		
Source(s) "Federal Government Gazette - Results of Contested Election and Statements of the Poll after the Official Addition of Votes Sarawak [P.U. (B) 245/2011]" (PDF). Attorney General's Chambers of Malaysia. 29 April 2011.

Sarawak state election, 2006
Party	Candidate	Votes	%	∆%
BN	Swin Jema'ah @ Aidan Wing	4,331	74.31	▼10.98
PKR	Saji Samat	1,497	25.69	▲14.60
Total valid votes		5,828	100.00	
Total rejected ballots		102		
Unreturned ballots		5		
Turnout		5,935	52.77	▼5.41
Registered electors		11,245		
Majority		2,834	48.63	▼25.57
BN hold		Swing		

Sarawak state election, 2001
Party	Candidate	Votes	%	∆%
BN	Swin Jema'ah @ Aidan Wing	10,115	85.29	▲12.09
PKR	Mohdar Ismail	1,315	11.09	▲11.09
Independent	Roslie Sili	430	3.62	▲3.62
Total valid votes		11,860	100.00	
Total rejected ballots		154		
Unreturned ballots		10		
Turnout		12,024	58.18	▲2.66
Registered electors		20,666		
Majority		8,800	74.20	▲24.74
BN hold		Swing		

Sarawak state election, 1996
Party	Candidate	Votes	%	∆%
BN	Swin Jema'ah @ Aidan Wing	7,794	73.20	▲2.86
Independent	Mohdar Ismail	2,528	23.74	▲23.74
Independent	Janting Jawa	326	3.06	▲3.06
Total valid votes		10,648	100.00	
Total rejected ballots		169		
Unreturned ballots		3		
Turnout		10,820	55.52	▼8.09
Registered electors		19,488		
Majority		5,266	49.46	▲8.79
BN hold		Swing		

Sarawak state election, 1991
Party	Candidate	Votes	%
BN	Usop Wahab	9,745	70.34
PBDS	Lawrence Tan Chok Sing	4,110	29.66
Total valid votes		13,855	100.00
Total rejected ballots		289	
Unreturned ballots		202	
Turnout		14,346	63.61
Registered electors		22,554	
Majority		5,635	40.67
This was a new constituency created.
