= Tupong (state constituency) =

Electoral constituency in Sarawak, Malaysia

Tupong (N06)
Sarawak constituency

State constituency
- Legislature: Sarawak State Legislative Assembly
MLA
Vacant
- Constituency created: 1987
- First contested: 1991
- Last contested: 2026

Tupong is a state constituency in Sarawak, Malaysia, that has been represented in the Sarawak State Legislative Assembly since 1991.

The state constituency was created in the 1987 redistribution and is mandated to return a single member to the Sarawak State Legislative Assembly under the first past the post voting system. It has amongst the highest concentrations of Malay-Muslim middle-class voters in Sarawak, and consists largely of low-density residential areas with emerging commercial zones. It comprises part of a ring of the most affluent Malay-majority areas in Sarawak, which are representative of Malay, middle-class, urban settings.

== Demographics ==
Ethnic breakdown of Tupong's electorate as of 2022
1. Malay-Muslim bumiputera (61.4%)
2. Chinese (19.0%)
3. Sarawak bumiputera (18.2%)
4. Other ethnicities (1.40%)

== History ==
As of 2020, Tupong has a population of 91,272 people.

=== Polling districts ===
According to the gazette issued on 31 October 2022, the Tupong constituency has a total of 9 polling districts.

State constituency	Polling Districts	Code	Location
Tupong（N06）	Tupong	194/06/01	SK Rakyat Tupong; Tabika Kemas Kpg. Tupong Tengah
Tupong（N06）	Gita	194/06/02	SMK Tuanku Abdul Rahman Jln. Matang; Dewan Serbaguna Kpg. Pinang Jawa
Tupong（N06）	Sungai Tengah	194/06/03	SJK (C) Sungai Tengah Jln. Sungei Tengah Matang; Dewan Serbaguna Kpg. Sagah; Dewan Serbaguna Datuk Amar Dr Sulaiman Daud Kpg. Kolong Dua; SK Tan Sri Datuk Haji Mohamed Taman Malihah; Dewan Serbaguna Taman Malihah
Tupong（N06）	Rahmat	194/06/04	SK Gita; Perkarangan Tempat Kereta Taman Hussein / Rahmat
Tupong（N06）	Sinjan	194/06/05	Dewan Sri Tanjong Kpg. Tanjong
Tupong（N06）	Sejoli	194/06/06	SK Tan Sri Dr Hj Sulaiman Daud; SMK Petra Jaya
Tupong（N06）	Paroh	194/06/07	Dewan Serbaguna Kpg Paroh
Tupong（N06）	Matang	194/06/08	SJK (C) Chung Hua Batu 7 Jln. Matang; SMK Matang; SK Matang; Dewan Pendidikan dan Sosial Kpg. Matang Batu 10 Jln. Matang; SK Matang Jaya; SK Petra Jaya; Dewan Serbaguna Taman Heng Guan
Tupong（N06）	Sri Wangi	194/06/09	Pusat Latihan ABIM Taman Sri Wangi Petra Jaya

=== Representation history ===
Members of the Legislative Assembly for Tupong
Assembly	No	Years	Member	Party
Constituency created from Petra Jaya, Stampin and Satok
13th	N05	1991-1996	Daud Abdul Rahman	BN (PBB)
14th	N05	1996-2001	Daud Abdul Rahman	BN (PBB)
15th	N05	2001-2006	Daud Abdul Rahman	BN (PBB)
16th	N06	2006-2011	Daud Abdul Rahman	BN (PBB)
17th	N06	2011-2016	Daud Abdul Rahman	BN (PBB)
18th	N06	2016-2018	Fazzrudin Abdul Rahman	BN (PBB)
18th	N06	2018-2021	Fazzrudin Abdul Rahman	GPS (PBB)
19th	N06	2021–2026	Fazzrudin Abdul Rahman	GPS (PBB)

== Election results ==
Sarawak state election, 2026
Party	Candidate	Votes	%	∆%
GPS	Fazzrudin Abdul Rahman			▲
PH				▲
Total valid votes				
Total rejected ballots				
Unreturned ballots				
Turnout				
Registered electors				
Majority				

Sarawak state election, 2021
Party	Candidate	Votes	%	∆%
GPS	Fazzrudin Abdul Rahman	12,544	85.25	▲85.25
PKR	Ahmad Nazib Johari	1,335	9.07	▼11.81
PBK	Chan Haong Yen	836	5.68	▲5.68
Total valid votes		14,715	100.00	
Total rejected ballots		125		
Unreturned ballots		131		
Turnout		14,971	57.57	
Registered electors		26,004		
Majority		11,209		
GPS gain from BN		Swing		?
Source(s) https://lom.agc.gov.my/ilims/upload/portal/akta/outputp/1718688/PUB687.pdf

Sarawak state election, 2016
Party	Candidate	Votes	%	∆%
BN	Fazzrudin Abdul Rahman	10,942	79.12	▲10.25
PKR	Nurhanim Hanna Mokhsen	2,887	20.88	▼10.25
Total valid votes		13,829	100.00	
Total rejected ballots		153		
Unreturned ballots		79		
Turnout		14,061	65.40	
Registered electors		21,499		
Majority		8,055		
BN hold		Swing		
Source(s) "Federal Government Gazette - Notice of Contested Election, State Legislative Assembly of the State of Sarawak [P.U. (B) 190/2016]" (PDF). Attorney General's Chambers of Malaysia. 25 April 2016. "Senarai Calon yang Disahkan Layak Bertanding Pilihan Raya Dewan Undangan Negeri ke- 11". Election Commission of Malaysia. 25 April 2016. Archived from the original on 25 April 2016.

Sarawak state election, 2011
Party	Candidate	Votes	%	∆%
BN	Daud Abdul Rahman	8,304	68.87	▼5.98
PKR	Baharuddin @ Din Shah Mokhsen	3,753	31.13	▲5.98
Total valid votes		12,057	100.00	
Total rejected ballots		135		
Unreturned ballots		0		
Turnout		12,192	68.51	
Registered electors		17,796		
Majority		4,551		
BN hold		Swing		
Source(s) "Federal Government Gazette - Results of Contested Election and Statements of the Poll after the Official Addition of Votes Sarawak [P.U. (B) 245/2011]" (PDF). Attorney General's Chambers of Malaysia. 29 April 2011.

Sarawak state election, 2021
Party	Candidate	Votes	%	∆%
GPS	Fazzrudin Abdul Rahman	12,544	85.25	▲6.13
PKR	Ahmad Nazib Johari	1,335	9.07	▼11.81
PBK	Chan Haong Yen	836	5.68	▲5.68
Total valid votes		14,715	100.00	
Total rejected ballots		125		
Unreturned ballots		131		
Turnout		14,971	57.57	▼7.83
Registered electors		26,004		
Majority		11,209	76.17	▲17.95
GPS gain from BN		Swing		?
Source(s) https://lom.agc.gov.my/ilims/upload/portal/akta/outputp/1718688/PUB687.pdf

Sarawak state election, 2016
Party	Candidate	Votes	%	∆%
BN	Fazzrudin Abdul Rahman	10,942	79.12	▲10.25
PKR	Nurhanim Hanna Mokhsen	2,887	20.88	▼10.25
Total valid votes		13,829	100.00	
Total rejected ballots		153		
Unreturned ballots		79		
Turnout		14,061	65.40	▼3.11
Registered electors		21,499		
Majority		8,055	58.22	▲20.47
BN hold		Swing		
Source(s) "Federal Government Gazette - Notice of Contested Election, State Legislative Assembly of the State of Sarawak [P.U. (B) 190/2016]" (PDF). Attorney General's Chambers of Malaysia. 25 April 2016. "Senarai Calon yang Disahkan Layak Bertanding Pilihan Raya Dewan Undangan Negeri ke-11". Election Commission of Malaysia. 25 April 2016. Archived from the original on 25 April 2016.

Sarawak state election, 2011
Party	Candidate	Votes	%	∆%
BN	Daud Abdul Rahman	8,304	68.87	▼5.98
PKR	Baharuddin Shah Mokhsen	3,753	31.13	▲5.98
Total valid votes		12,057	100.00	
Total rejected ballots		135		
Unreturned ballots		0		
Turnout		12,192	68.51	▲5.43
Registered electors		17,796		
Majority		4,551	37.75	▼11.96
BN hold		Swing		
Source(s) "Federal Government Gazette - Results of Contested Election and Statements of the Poll after the Official Addition of Votes Sarawak [P.U. (B) 245/2011]" (PDF). Attorney General's Chambers of Malaysia. 29 April 2011.

Sarawak state election, 2006
Party	Candidate	Votes	%	∆%
BN	Daud Abdul Rahman	6,885	74.85	▲0.60
PKR	Ramlee Mahtar	2,313	25.15	▲1.90
Total valid votes		9,198	100.00	
Total rejected ballots		103		
Unreturned ballots		27		
Turnout		9,328	63.08	▼8.83
Registered electors		14,787		
Majority		4,572	49.71	▼1.27
BN hold		Swing		

Sarawak state election, 2001
Party	Candidate	Votes	%	∆%
BN	Daud Abdul Rahman	7,037	74.25	▼16.20
PKR	Ismadi Abdul Wahed	2,203	23.25	▲23.25
Independent	Mustafa Jinal Abidin Mohamed	237	2.50	▲2.50
Total valid votes		9,477	100.00	
Total rejected ballots		98		
Unreturned ballots		15		
Turnout		9,590	71.91	▲7.73
Registered electors		13,336		
Majority		4,834	50.98	▼29.92
BN hold		Swing		

Sarawak state election, 1996
Party	Candidate	Votes	%	∆%
BN	Daud Abdul Rahman	6,264	90.45	▲12.25
Independent	Abang Ariffin Abang Sebli	661	9.55	▲9.55
Total valid votes		6,925	100.00	
Total rejected ballots		142		
Unreturned ballots		69		
Turnout		7,136	64.18	▼5.58
Registered electors		11,119		
Majority		5,603	80.90	▲23.19
BN hold		Swing		

Sarawak state election, 1991
Party	Candidate	Votes	%	∆%
BN	Daud Abdul Rahman	7,806	78.20	▲78.20
PERMAS	Baharuddin Shah Mokhsen	2,045	20.49	▲20.49
NEGARA	Suhaili Mumin	131	1.31	▲1.31
Total valid votes		9,982	100.00	
Total rejected ballots		156		
Unreturned ballots		137		
Turnout		10,275	69.76	▲69.76
Registered electors		14,730		
Majority		5,761	57.71	▲57.71
This was a new constituency created.
