= Sebuyau (state constituency) =

Constituency in Sarawak, Malaysia

Sebuyau (N27)
Sarawak constituency

State constituency
- Legislature: Sarawak State Legislative Assembly
MLA
Vacant
- Constituency created: 1987
- First contested: 1991
- Last contested: 2026

Sebuyau is a state constituency in Sarawak, Malaysia, that has been represented in the Sarawak State Legislative Assembly since 1991.

The state constituency was created in the 1987 redistribution and is mandated to return a single member to the Sarawak State Legislative Assembly under the first past the post voting system.

== Demographics ==
Ethnic breakdown of Sebuyau's electorate as of 2022
1. Malay-Muslim bumiputera (64.6%)
2. Sarawak bumiputera (32.0%)
3. Chinese (2.80%)
4. Other ethnicities (0.60%)

== History ==
As of 2020, Sebuyau has a population of 11,822 people.

=== Polling districts ===
According to the gazette issued on 31 October 2022, the Sebuyau constituency has a total of 6 polling districts.

State constituency	Polling Districts	Code	Location
Sebuyau（N27）	Seruyu	201/27/01	SK Seruyuk
Sebuyau（N27）	Sebangan	201/21/02	SK Sg. Ladong; Balai Raya Sg. Segali; SK Hj. Bujang Sebangan; Dewan Masyarakat Sebangan Sampat
Sebuyau（N27）	Sebuyau	201/27/03	SK Bajong; SK Tebelu; Astaka SK Kelait; SK Tuanku Bagus Sebuyau; SMK Sebuyau; SJK (C) Chung Hua Sebuyau
Sebuyau（N27）	Entangor	201/27/04	SK St. Andrew Entanggor
Sebuyau（N27）	Senayang	201/27/05	SK Lunying; Dewam SK Bulan Jeragam; RH Belayong Sg Nyamok; SK Mawang Taup; Dewan Serbaguna Sg. Rama; SK Raba
Sebuyau（N27）	Tungkah	201/27/06	SK Sg. Arus; SK Tungkah (Malay); SK Tungkah (Dayak); SK Rajau Ensika; SK Skitong / Meranti; Dewan Kpg Stika

=== Representation history ===
Members of the Legislative Assembly for Sebuyau
Assembly	No	Years	Member	Party
Constituency created from Lingga, Semera and Sri Aman
13th	N18	1991-1996	Julaihi Narawi	BN (PBB)
14th	N20	1996-2001	Julaihi Narawi	BN (PBB)
15th	N20	2001-2006	Julaihi Narawi	BN (PBB)
16th	N22	2006-2011	Julaihi Narawi	BN (PBB)
17th	N22	2011-2016	Julaihi Narawi	BN (PBB)
18th	N27	2016-2018	Julaihi Narawi	BN (PBB)
18th	N27	2018-2021	Julaihi Narawi	GPS (PBB)
19th	N27	2021–2026	Julaihi Narawi	GPS (PBB)

== Election results ==
Sarawak state election, 2026
Party	Candidate	Votes	%	∆%
GPS				▲
PH				▲
PH				▲
Total valid votes				
Total rejected ballots				
Unreturned ballots				
Turnout				
Registered electors				
Majority				

Sarawak state election, 2021
Party	Candidate	Votes	%	∆%
GPS	Julaihi Narawi	4,937	79.30	▲9.42
Amanah	Maxwell Rojis	803	12.90	▲10.37
PBK	Wan Chee Wan Mahjar	486	7.81	▲7.81
Total valid votes		6,226	100.00	
Total rejected ballots		145		
Unreturned ballots		17		
Turnout		6,388	68.20	▼5.02
Registered electors		9,367		
Majority		4,134	66.40	▲24.12
GPS gain from BN		Swing		?
Source(s) https://lom.agc.gov.my/ilims/upload/portal/akta/outputp/1718688/PUB687.pdf

Sarawak state election, 2016
Party	Candidate	Votes	%	∆%
BN	Julaihi Narawi	4,531	69.88	▲1.10
PAS	Wan Abdillah Wan Ahmad	1,789	27.59	▼2.49
Amanah	Andrew Jain	164	2.53	▲2.53
Total valid votes		6,484	100.00	
Total rejected ballots		118		
Unreturned ballots		18		
Turnout		6,620	73.22	▼6.13
Registered electors		9,041		
Majority		2,742	42.29	▲3.59
BN hold		Swing		
Source(s) "Federal Government Gazette - Notice of Contested Election, State Legislative Assembly of the State of Sarawak [P.U. (B) 190/2016]" (PDF). Attorney General's Chambers of Malaysia. 25 April 2016. Archived from the original (PDF) on 2017-06-12. "Senarai Calon yang Disahkan Layak Bertanding Pilihan Raya Dewan Undangan Negeri ke-11". Election Commission of Malaysia. 25 April 2016. Archived from the original on 25 April 2016.

Sarawak state election, 2011
Party	Candidate	Votes	%	∆%
BN	Julaihi Narawi	4,045	68.78	▼5.47
PAS	Adam Ahid	1,769	30.08	▲30.08
Independent	Ali Semsu	67	1.14	▲1.14
Total valid votes		5,881	100.00	
Total rejected ballots		87		
Unreturned ballots		11		
Turnout		5,979	74.35	▲6.29
Registered electors		8,042		
Majority		2,276	38.70	▼9.79
BN hold		Swing		
Source(s) "Federal Government Gazette - Results of Contested Election and Statements of the Poll after the Official Addition of Votes Sarawak [P.U. (B) 245/2011]" (PDF). Attorney General's Chambers of Malaysia. 29 April 2011.

Sarawak state election, 2006
Party	Candidate	Votes	%	∆%
BN	Julaihi Narawi	3,748	74.25	▼4.36
PKR	Mohamad Akek	1,300	25.75	▲9.51
Total valid votes		5,048	100.00	
Total rejected ballots		86		
Unreturned ballots		4		
Turnout		5,138	68.06	▲0.79
Registered electors		7,549		
Majority		2,448	48.49	▼13.88
BN hold		Swing		

Sarawak state election, 2001
Party	Candidate	Votes	%	∆%
BN	Julaihi Narawi	5,200	78.61	▲78.61
PKR	Mohamad Akek	1,074	16.24	▲16.24
Independent	Dayang Saadiah Mat	341	5.15	▲5.15
Total valid votes		6,615	100.00	
Total rejected ballots		91		
Unreturned ballots		2		
Turnout		6,708	67.27	
Registered electors		9,972		
Majority		4,126	62.37	
BN hold		Swing		

Sarawak state election, 1996
Party	Candidate	Votes	%	∆%
On the nomination day, Julaihi Narawi won uncontested.
BN	Julaihi Narawi			
Total valid votes			100.00	
Total rejected ballots				
Unreturned ballots				
Turnout				
Registered electors		10,335		
Majority				
BN hold		Swing		

Sarawak state election, 1991
Party	Candidate	Votes	%
BN	Julaihi Narawi	3,584	62.30
PBDS	Wel @ Maxwell Rojis	1,337	23.24
PERMAS	Wan Fauzi Tku Ayubi	748	13.00
Independent	Jonathan Sumping Bayang	57	0.99
Independent	Awg Azmi Awg Mat	27	0.47
Total valid votes		5,753	100.00
Total rejected ballots		98	
Unreturned ballots		11	
Turnout		5,862	73.19
Registered electors		8,009	
Majority		2,247	39.06
This was a new constituency created.
