= Dato =

Dato may refer to:

== People ==
- Dato Khujadze, also known as Dato, Georgian pop singer
- Eduardo Dato, Spanish politician
- Luis Dato, a 20th-century romantic Filipino poet

== Other uses ==
- Dato, a variant of Datuk, a traditional Malay honorific title
- Dato (newspaper), a Danish newspaper
