= Demak Laut (state constituency) =

State constituency in Sarawak, Malaysia

Demak Laut (N05)
Sarawak constituency

State constituency
- Legislature: Sarawak State Legislative Assembly
MLA
Vacant
- Constituency created: 1996
- First contested: 1996
- Last contested: 2026

Demak Laut is a state constituency in Sarawak, Malaysia, that has been represented in the Sarawak State Legislative Assembly since 1996.

The state constituency was created in the 1996 redistribution and is mandated to return a single member to the Sarawak State Legislative Assembly under the first past the post voting system.

== Demographics ==
Ethnic breakdown of Demak Laut's electorate as of 2022
1. Malay-Muslim bumiputera (84.1%)
2. Chinese (9.10%)
3. Sarawak bumiputera (6.20%)
4. Other ethnicities (0.60%)

== History ==
As of 2020, Demak Laut has a population of 45,678 people.

=== Polling districts ===
According to the gazette issued on 31 October 2022, the Demak Laut constituency has a total of 11 polling districts.

State constituency	Polling Districts	Code	Location
Demak Laut (N05)	Tanjong Embang	193/05/01	SK Beradek
Demak Laut (N05)	Muara Tebas	193/05/02	SK Muara Tebas
Demak Laut (N05)	Geobilt	193/05/03	SK Geobilt
Demak Laut (N05)	Bako	193/05/04	SK Bako; Dewan Hijrah 2008
Demak Laut (N05)	Sejingkat	193/05/05	SK Sejingkat; Tadika Kemas Taman Sepakat Jaya
Demak Laut (N05)	Senari	193/05/06	SK Senari
Demak Laut (N05)	Tanjung Bako	193/05/07	SK Kpg. Tanjong Bako
Demak Laut (N05)	Pinggan Jaya	193/05/08	SK Muhibbah (Seberang Pending)
Demak Laut (N05)	Tabuan Melayu	193/05/09	SK Tabuan Hilir; Dewan Daro Sri Wan Junaidi Kpg. Tabuan Lot
Demak Laut (N05)	Muara Tabuan	193/05/10	SK Tabuan
Demak Laut (N05)	Tabuan Hulu	193/05/11	Balai Raya Kpg. Tabuan Hulu Hj Drahman

=== Representation history ===
Members of the Legislative Assembly for Demak Laut
Assembly	No	Years	Member	Party
Constituency created, renamed from Sejingkat
14th	N04	1996-2001	Abang Draup Zamahari Abang Zen	BN (PBB)
15th	N04	2001-2006	Abang Draup Zamahari Abang Zen	BN (PBB)
16th	N04	2006-2011	Abang Draup Zamahari Abang Zen	BN (PBB)
17th	N05	2011-2016	Hazland Abang Hipni	BN (PBB)
18th	N05	2016–2018	Hazland Abang Hipni	BN (PBB)
18th	N05	2018-2021	Hazland Abang Hipni	GPS (PBB)
19th	N05	2021–2026	Hazland Abang Hipni	GPS (PBB)

== Election results ==
Sarawak state election, 2026
Party	Candidate	Votes	%	∆%
GPS				▲
PH				▲
Total valid votes				
Total rejected ballots				
Unreturned ballots				
Turnout				
Registered electors				
Majority				

Sarawak state election, 2021
Party	Candidate	Votes	%	∆%
GPS	Hazland Abang Hipni	7,636	78.25	▲78.25
PSB	Yatika Jelani	1,237	12.68	▲12.68
Independent	Khairul Ahmad	674	6.91	▲6.91
Amanah	Jen Peli	212	2.17	▼9.76
Total valid votes		9,759	100.00	
Total rejected ballots		237		
Unreturned ballots		28		
Turnout		10,024	67.67	▼3.76
Registered electors		14,813		
Majority		6,399	65.55	▼10.57
GPS gain from BN		Swing		?
Source(s) https://lom.agc.gov.my/ilims/upload/portal/akta/outputp/1718688/PUB687.pdf

Sarawak state election, 2016
Party	Candidate	Votes	%	∆%
BN	Hazland Abang Hipni	8,539	88.07	▲12.34
Amanah	Mohammad Fidzuan Zaidi	1,157	11.93	▲11.93
Total valid votes		9,696	100.00	
Total rejected ballots		139		
Unreturned ballots		44		
Turnout		9,879	71.43	▲0.50
Registered electors		13,830		
Majority		7,382	76.12	▲24.70
BN hold		Swing		
Source(s) "Federal Government Gazette -Notice of Contested Election, State Legislative Assembly of the State of Sarawak [P.U. (B) 190/2016]" (PDF). Attorney General's Chambers of Malaysia. 25 April 2016. Archived from the original (PDF) on 2017-06-12. "Senarai Calon yang Disahkan Layak Bertanding Pilihan Raya Dewan Undangan Negeri ke-11". Election Commission of Malaysia. 25 April 2016. Archived from the original on 2016-04-25.

Sarawak state election, 2011
Party	Candidate	Votes	%	∆%
BN	Hazland Abang Hipni	5,522	75.73	▼1.65
PKR	Ali Hossen Abang	1,770	24.27	▲1.65
Total valid votes		7,292	100.00	
Total rejected ballots		98		
Unreturned ballots		13		
Turnout		7,403	70.93	▲4.48
Registered electors		10,437		
Majority		3,752	51.42	▼3.34
BN hold		Swing		
Source(s) "Federal Government Gazette -Results of Contested Election and Statements of the Poll after the Official Addition of Votes Sarawak [P.U. (B) 245/2011]" (PDF). Attorney General's Chambers of Malaysia. 29 April 2011.

Sarawak state election, 2006
Party	Candidate	Votes	%	∆%
BN	Abang Draup Zamahari Abang Zen	5,094	77.38	▲6.21
PKR	Saidan Massudin Sahini	1,489	22.62	▲6.47
Total valid votes		6,583	100.00	
Total rejected ballots		102		
Unreturned ballots		14		
Turnout		6,699	66.45	▼6.72
Registered electors		10,080		
Majority		3,605	54.76	▼0.24
BN hold		Swing		

Sarawak state election, 2001
Party	Candidate	Votes	%	∆%
BN	Abang Draup Zamahari Abang Zen	4,974	71.17	▼19.75
PKR	Ahmad Lukman Abang Ibrahim	1,129	16.15	▲16.15
Independent	Abang Yusof Abang Razak	886	12.68	▲12.68
Total valid votes		6,989	100.00	
Total rejected ballots		68		
Unreturned ballots		11		
Turnout		7,068	73.17	▲6.66
Registered electors		9,660		
Majority		3,845	55.00	▼26.83
BN hold		Swing		

Sarawak state election, 1996
Party	Candidate	Votes	%	∆%
BN	Abang Draup Zamahari Abang Zen	5,365	90.92	▲90.92
Independent	Junaidi Putit	536	9.08	▲9.08
Total valid votes		5,901	100.00	
Total rejected ballots		130		
Unreturned ballots		26		
Turnout		6,057	66.51	▲66.51
Registered electors		9,107		
Majority		4,829	81.83	▲81.83
This was a new constituency created.
