= Dato Khujadze =

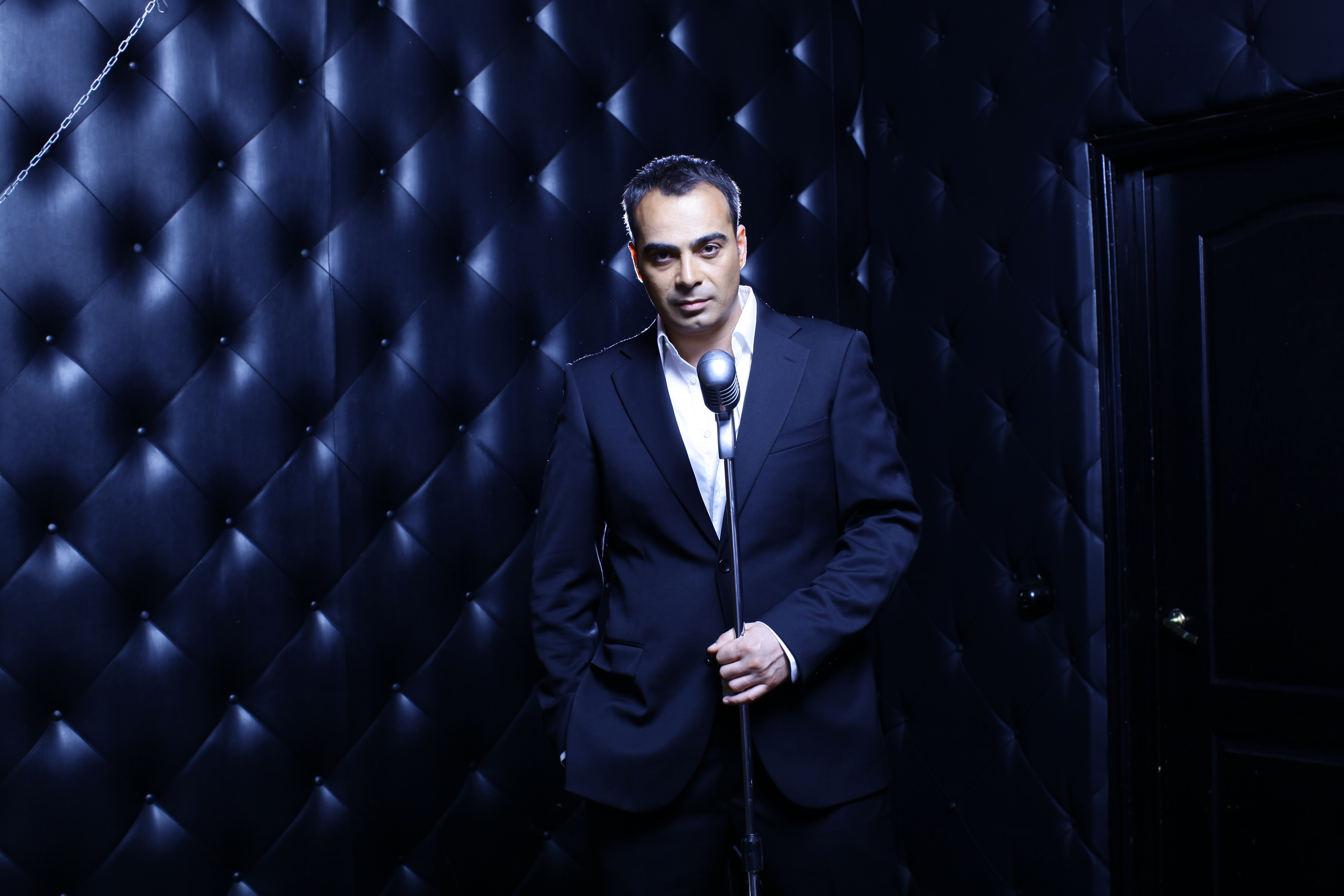

Background information
- Also known as: Dato
- Born: David Khujadze; 25 June 1975 (age 50); Tbilisi, Georgia
- Genres: Pop, R&B
- Occupation(s): singer, songwriter
- Years active: 2000–present

David "Dato" Khujadze (Georgian: დავით (დათო) ხუჯაძე, Russian: Дато Худжадзе; or Xujadze; born 25 June 1975 in Tbilisi) is a popular Georgian pop singer in Russia and Israel.

He had a brief political career in the government of Georgian president Eduard Shevardnadze. He briefly served in the Georgian parliament, but his political career ended with the Rose Revolution.

Notable singles of Dato are "Makhinji Var" and "Janaia" in collaboration with Ligalize.

== Hobbies and interests ==
Dato used to be keen on paragliding and collecting rare cars. He owns two Mustangs in Tbilisi and one of them is especially dear to his heart, because it was given as a gift to a Soviet tennis player in Wimbledon and was brought to Georgia from the UK.

== Awards and achievements ==
- Big Apple Music Awards (New York 2011) – 'Best European artist'.
- Big Apple Music Awards (New York 2009) — 'Best music video'.
- 'God of the Airwaves' award (Moscow, 2010) — category 'most versatile Russian artist'.
- 'Best of the Best' (Russian professional award) (Moscow, 2007).
- Voice of the Asia festival (Almaty, 2001) – Public's Choice prize.
- Black Music club festival (Moscow, 2001) – Grand Prize.
- 'Slavyansky Bazar' (Slav Bazaar) festival (Kyiv, 2000) — Grand Prize.
- Was awarded as "The male singer of the year" in Georgia on several occasions.

== Discography ==
- I Want You to Want This (2002)
- I Don't Want to Hurt You (2003)
- Sand Dream (2005)
- Deja vu - EP (2013)
- New Ethno - EP (re-release, 2018)
