= Semop =

Semop (N42)
Sarawak constituency

State constituency
- Legislature: Sarawak State Legislative Assembly
MLA
Vacant
- Constituency created: 2005
- First contested: 2006
- Last contested: 2026

Demographics
- Population (2020): 14,035
- Electors (2021): 10,297

Semop is a state constituency in Sarawak, Malaysia, that has been represented in the Sarawak State Legislative Assembly since 2006.

The state constituency was created in the 2005 redistribution and is mandated to return a single member to the Sarawak State Legislative Assembly under the first past the post voting system.

== Demographics ==
Ethnic breakdown of Semop's electorate as of 2022
1. Malay-Muslim bumiputera (75.2%)
2. Sarawak bumiputera (20.5%)
3. Chinese (3.60%)
4. Other ethnicities (0.70%)

== History ==
As of 2020, Semop has a population of 14,035 people.

=== Polling districts ===
According to the gazette issued on 31 October 2022, the Semop constituency has a total of 8 polling districts.

State constituency	Polling Districts	Code	Location
Semop (N42)	Paloh	206/42/01	SK Kpg. Sebako; Surau Kpg. Sedi; SK O.K.M. Pakeri Paloh; Dewan Serbaguna, Berangan Paloh; Tadika KEMAS Kpg. Kedang
Semop (N42)	Mupong	206/42/02	SK Mupong; SK Mupong Ulin
Semop (N42)	Semop	206/42/03	SK Kpg. Serdeng; SK Telok Gelam; SK Kpg. Bekakong; SK Kpg. Semop
Semop (N42)	Saai	206/42/04	SK Kpg. Kuit; SK Mohamad Radeh Kpg. Saie
Semop (N42)	Tekajong	206/42/05	SK Penibong; SK Kpg. Betanak; SK Salah Kecil; SK Kpg. Penipah; SK Kpg. Tekajong
Semop (N42)	Bruit	206/42/06	SK Kpg. Bruit
Semop (N42)	Bunut	206/42/07	SK Selidap; SJK (C) Ming Shing Sg. Sian; SK Sg. Sian; SK Tanjong Bundong
Semop (N42)	Bintangor	206/42/08	SK Abang Amin Bintangor

=== Representation history ===
Members of the Legislative Assembly for Semop
Assembly	No	Years	Member	Party
Constituency created, split from Serdeng, Belawai and Meradong
16th	N36	2006-2011	Mohamad Asfia Awang Nassar	BN (PBB)
17th	N36	2011-2016	Abdullah Saidol	BN (PBB)
18th	N42	2016–2018	Abdullah Saidol	BN (PBB)
18th	N42	2018-2021	Abdullah Saidol	GPS (PBB)
19th	N42	2021–2026	Abdullah Saidol	GPS (PBB)

== Election results ==
Sarawak state election, 2026: Semop
Party	Candidate	Votes	%	∆%
GPS				▲
PH				▲
Total valid votes				
Total rejected ballots				
Unreturned ballots				
Turnout				
Registered electors				
Majority				

Sarawak state election, 2021: Semop
Party	Candidate	Votes	%	∆%
GPS	Abdullah Saidol	4,338	64.58	▲64.58
PSB	Abdul Raafidin Majidi	1,180	17.57	▲17.57
Independent	Mohd Adenan Zulkepli	811	12.07	▲12.07
Amanah	Mohamad Fadillah Sabali	270	4.02	▼10.21
PBK	Jenny Wong Khing Ling	119	1.76	▲1.76
Total valid votes		6,717	100.00	
Total rejected ballots		109		
Unreturned ballots		36		
Turnout		6,862	66.64	▲0.81
Registered electors		10,297		
Majority		3,158	47.01	▼24.53
GPS gain from BN		Swing		?
Source(s) https://lom.agc.gov.my/ilims/upload/portal/akta/outputp/1718688/PUB687.pdf

Sarawak state election, 2016: Semop
Party	Candidate	Votes	%	∆%
BN	Abdullah Saidol	5,290	85.77	▲2.73
Amanah	Mohamad Fadillah Sabali	878	14.23	▲14.23
Total valid votes		6,168	100.00	
Total rejected ballots		139		
Unreturned ballots		24		
Turnout		6,331	65.83	▼0.72
Registered electors		9,617		
Majority		4,412	71.54	▲1.79
BN hold		Swing		
Source(s) "Federal Government Gazette - Notice of Contested Election, State Legislative Assembly of the State of Sarawak [P.U. (B) 190/2016]" (PDF). Attorney General's Chambers of Malaysia. 25 April 2016. "Senarai Calon yang Disahkan Layak Bertanding Pilihan Raya Dewan Undangan Negeri ke-11". Election Commission of Malaysia. 25 April 2016. Archived from the original on 25 April 2016.

Sarawak state election, 2011: Semop
Party	Candidate	Votes	%	∆%
BN	Abdullah Saidol	4,814	83.04	▲4.90
PKR	Ong Chung Siew	564	9.73	▼12.13
Independent	Ajiji Fauzan	419	7.23	▲7.23
Total valid votes		5,797	100.00	
Total rejected ballots		114		
Unreturned ballots		6		
Turnout		5,917	66.55	▲2.66
Registered electors		8,891		
Majority		4,250	73.31	▲17.03
BN hold		Swing		
Source(s) "Federal Government Gazette - Results of Contested Election and Statements of the Poll after the Official Addition of Votes Sarawak [P.U. (B) 245/2011]" (PDF). Attorney General's Chambers of Malaysia. 29 April 2011.

Sarawak state election, 2006: Semop
Party	Candidate	Votes	%
BN	Mohamad Asfia Awang Nassar	4,479	78.14
PKR	Noh @ Sa'bi @ Saabi	1,253	21.86
Total valid votes		5,732	100.00
Total rejected ballots		122	
Unreturned ballots		0	
Turnout		5,854	63.89
Registered electors		9,162	
Majority		3,226	56.28
This was a new constituency created.
