= Sarawak State Legislative Assembly =

Unicameral legislature of the Malaysian state of Sarawak

Sarawak State Legislative Assembly Dewan Undangan Negeri Sarawak
- 19th Assembly (dissolved)

Type
- Type: Unicameral

History
- Founded: 8 September 1867

Leadership
- Yang di-Pertua Negeri: Wan Junaidi Tuanku Jaafar since 26 January 2024
- Speaker: Mohamad Asfia Awang Nassar, GPS–PBB since 15 January 2000
- Deputy Speaker: Idris Buang, GPS–PBB since 11 February 2022
- Premier: Abang Abdul Rahman Johari Abang Openg, GPS–PBB since 13 January 2017
- Opposition Leader: Chong Chieng Jen, PH–DAP since 20 November 2023

Structure
- Seats: 82
- Political groups: (As of 6 April 2024) Government (79); GPS (79): PBB (47); SUPP (13); PRS (11); PDP (8); Confidence and supply (1); Independent (1) Opposition (2); PH (2): DAP (2)
- Committees: 6: Rules of Proceedings and Elections Committee; Public Accounts Committee; Assembly Committee; Public Petitions Committee; Privileges Committee; DUN Events Committee

Elections
- Voting system: First-past-the-post
- Last election: 18 December 2021
- Next election: 12 December 2026

Meeting place
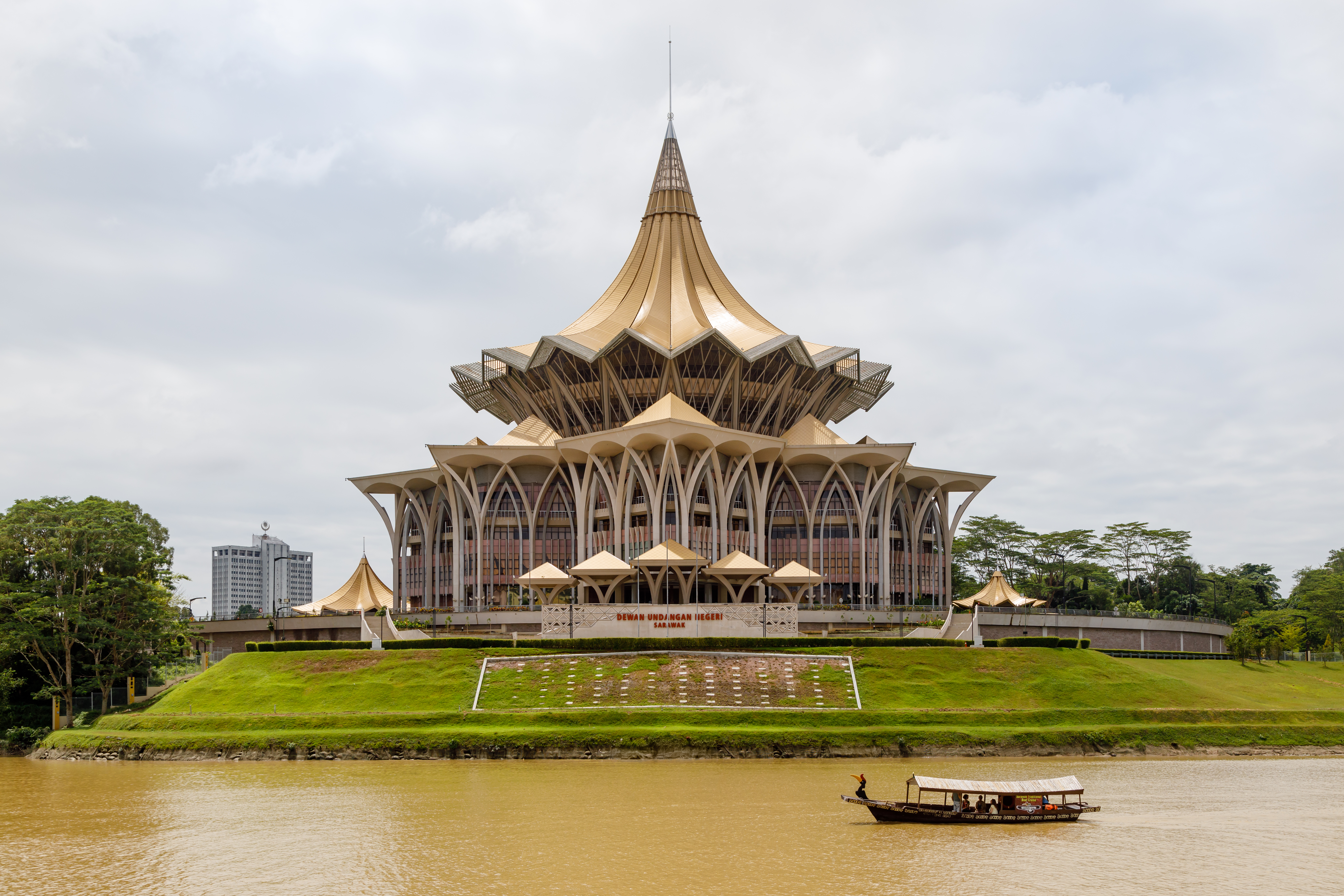
- New Sarawak Legislative Assembly Building, Petra Jaya, Kuching, Sarawak, Malaysia

Website
- duns.sarawak.gov.my

The Sarawak State Legislative Assembly (Malay: Dewan Undangan Negeri Sarawak) is the legislative chamber of the unicameral legislature of the Malaysian state of Sarawak; the Yang di-Pertua Negeri of Sarawak forms the other part of the legislature. The Assembly is modelled after the traditions of the Westminster parliamentary system, which originates from the practices of the British Parliament. The executive branch of government is drawn from the elected members of the Assembly. The State Legislative Assembly sits at the Sarawak Legislative Assembly Building located in Petra Jaya in Kuching, the state capital.

The Legislative Assembly, as of 2019, consists of 82 members, making it the largest state legislature in Malaysia. Members are elected from single-member constituencies throughout the state under the first-past-the-post voting system, with elections held no more than five years apart. Sarawak does not practice compulsory voting, and eligible citizens are not automatically registered to vote in elections. Elections for the Assembly have been out of sync with the rest of Malaysia since 1978.

The Assembly is also the oldest legislature in Malaysia and one of the oldest continuously functioning legislatures in the world, being established on 8 September 1867 as the General Council under the Raj of Sarawak. In 1903, the General Council became the Council Negri (lit. 'State Council'), which lasted through the remainder of the Raj and continued throughout the colonial period and into the early years of the federation. However, the legislature was not directly elected until 1969.

The executive is formed by the party or parties who commands the confidence and supply of the Assembly, with the leader of said party or parties becoming the Premier, the head of government of the state. The formal appointment of the chief minister is performed by the Yang di-Pertua Negeri. Since 2018, the Gabungan Parti Sarawak coalition holds a majority in the Assembly, after the component parties split from the Barisan Nasional coalition in the aftermath of the general election. Abang Abdul Rahman Johari Abang Openg has been the chief minister since 2017.

== History ==
The first legislative assembly in Sarawak was formed during the rule of the White Rajahs. The General Council (Majlis Umum) of the Kingdom of Sarawak was convened on 8 September 1867 by Charles Brooke, the Rajah Muda under the orders of James Brooke, then the Rajah of Sarawak. Its members were chosen from local tribe leaders who were thought to be capable of assisting Brooke in administering the kingdom. The General Council later evolved into the Council Negri in 1903. The Council Negri first met in Bintulu.

It continued to function even after Sarawak was ceded to the British Empire in 1946. Since 1963, when Sarawak joined with Malaya, Singapore and North Borneo (now known as Sabah) to form Malaysia, in line with the federal and state constitutions, members of the Assembly have been elected representatives.

The General Council members in 1867 were restricted to five British officers and 16 Malay and Melanau members with Rajah as the president. As the population of the state grew, so do the members of the General Council. In 1937, Chinese and Ibans were included in the membership. The 1941 constitution of Sarawak supposedly ended the Rajah's absolute rule over the council, but it did not materialise due to the Japanese occupation. In 1956, another constitution was drawn to expand the composition to 24 elected unofficial members, including 14 ex-officio, four nominated members, and three standing members. The unofficial members were elected through indirect three-tier system. In 1963, the membership was increased from 24 to 36 members.

In 1976, Council Negri formally changed its name to Dewan Undangan Negeri (state legislative assembly) through amendment of Sarawak constitution. Since 2024 until now, the current name of Dewan Undangan Negeri Sarawak finally renamed as Dewan Undangan Sarawak (Sarawak Legislative Assembly) in accordance with the Sarawak autonomy rights as enshrined in Malaysia Agreement 1963 (MA63).

In 1969, the Assembly had 48 seats elected from single-member constituencies. This increased to 56 in 1985, to 62 in 1995 and to 71 in 2005. In 2014, the Assembly passed an Ordinance to take the number of constituencies to 82. It has the largest number of seats among the state legislatures in Malaysia.

== Role ==
The Legislative Assembly is constituted under article 13 of the state constitution. The Assembly has the power to legislate on any matter for the state, except those that are within the exclusive domain of the federal Parliament as set out in the Federal List of the ninth schedule of the federal constitution. The Concurrent List (including the supplement) in the same schedule specifies the subjects that both the Assembly and Parliament may legislate for; however, the federal law prevails where they conflict. The State List (including the supplement) are matters that are exclusively under the jurisdiction of the state. However, the Assembly also has residual powers over any matters that are not specified in the schedule.

Primary legislation successfully passed in the Assembly are styled Ordinances. The Assembly must sit at least once every six months (and often only does so at that frequency) to approve taxation to and supply from the state's consolidated fund. This is done during the tabling of the budget by the executive Cabinet. Aside from administrative matters, members of the Assembly are free to speak on any issues, as stipulated in the Privileges, Immunities and Powers Ordinance 1963. Members of the Assembly are responsible for scrutinising the executive government's actions.

The speaker presides over proceedings in the Assembly. They are appointed by the Yang di-Pertua Negeri (Governor) on the advice of the premier. The speaker does not vote in any proceeding except to break a tie, and even then would only vote according to Speaker Denison's rule by convention.

== Procedures ==
The Legislative Assembly meets at the Sarawak Legislative Assembly Building in Petra Jaya, Kuching. The chamber is furnished in red, similar to upper houses of Westminster system parliaments. Four rows of desks (benches) are located on opposite sides of the chamber, furnished with leather office chairs, individual microphones and electronic voting equipment. The speaker's desk is at the end of the chamber furthest from the entrance; the secretaries' desk is located directly in front of the speaker to allow them to advise the speaker on procedural matters when necessary. In front of the secretaries' desk is the Table of the Assembly, on which the Mace rests. During the opening of the Assembly, the governor addresses the Assembly from a throne behind the speaker's chair. The sergeant-at-arms sit at the entrance of the chamber, opposite the speaker.

Government members sit on the benches on the speaker's right, while Opposition members take their seats on the speaker's left. However, government MLAs may overflow onto the opposition's side of the chamber, in which case they occupy the seats furthest from the speaker first. Government ministers and the shadow cabinet occupy the front rows and are thus known as frontbenchers, with the premier and leader of the opposition sitting closest to the speaker. All other members are known as backbenchers (regardless of whether they are sitting on the front row or back). The chamber has enough seats for 112 members, 30 more than the current number of members.

The Assembly is constitutionally required to sit at least once every six months, and often only does as such. Sittings are held on Mondays to Fridays until all business for the session is concluded (usually about two weeks). In exceptional circumstances, a sitting may also be held on a weekend.

Proceedings in the Assembly are governed by standing orders. Standing orders are adopted at the start of each term of the Assembly. Public debates are recorded and archived in the Official Reports, also commonly known as the Hansard.

Each year, a new session of the Assembly begins with a ceremonial opening of the Assembly, in which the governor, in the presence of all members, delivers an address outlining the government's legislative agenda.

During debates, Members may speak only if called upon by the speaker (or a deputy speaker, if the speaker is not presiding). Traditionally, the presiding officer alternates between calling members from the government and opposition. The premier, the leader of the opposition, and other leaders from both sides are normally given priority.

Sarawak is unusual within Malaysia in that both Malay and English have equal standing in proceedings of the Legislative Assembly – debates frequently switch between both languages and members may choose to use either or both. Speeches are addressed to the presiding officer, using the words Tuan Speaker (lit. 'Mr Speaker'), Puan Speaker (lit. 'Madam Speaker'), Tuan Timbalan Speaker (lit. 'Mr Deputy Speaker') or Puan Timbalan Speaker (lit. 'Madam Deputy Speaker') as appropriate. Only the presiding officer may be directly addressed in debate; other members must be referred to in the third person. Traditionally, members do not refer to each other by name, but by constituency, using forms such as "the Honourable Member for [constituency]" in English or "Ahli Yang Berhormat untuk [constituency]" in Malay. Members of the same party (or allied parties or groups) may refer to each other as "my friend" or "kawan kita". This may not always be the case during the actual oral delivery, when it might be difficult for a member to remember another member's exact constituency, but it is invariably followed in the transcript entered in the Hansard. The speaker enforces the rules of the House and may warn and punish members who deviate from them. Disregarding the speaker's instructions is considered a breach of the rules of the House and may result in the suspension of the offender from the House. In the case of grave disorder, the speaker may adjourn the House without taking a vote.

At the start of every day of sitting, time is allotted for backbenchers to ask questions of government ministers (including the chief minister) that they must answer to scrutinise the government's activities. Questions are generally required to be placed on the notice paper prior to the sitting, but questions without notice may sometimes be permitted. In practice, non-constituency-related questions asked in question time are usually pre-arranged by each party.

The government may propose new legislation, known as bills, to the Assembly. Timeslots may sometimes be allocated to opposition or independent members to propose their own bills, although these rarely pass without governmental support. Every bill that becomes law goes through multiple stages of debate: a first reading where the bill is formally introduced into Assembly business, a second reading where general debate on the bill occurs, a committee stage where a bill is sent to a committee to be scrutinised clause-by-clause and for amendments to be considered, a report stage where any amendments (or possibly a recommendation to reject the bill) agreed in the committee are voted on by the legislature, and finally a third reading where the bill is read with all amendments and approved or rejected in its entirety. Bills that are passed by the Assembly are then sent to the Governor to be assented to, where they finally become state law, known as Ordinances.

When a debate concludes, the motion in question is put to a vote. The Assembly first votes by voice vote; the speaker or deputy speaker puts the question, and members respond either "Yes!" (in favour of the motion) or "No!" (against the motion). The presiding officer then announces the result of the voice vote, but if his or her assessment is challenged by any member or the voice vote is unclear, a recorded vote known as a division follows. The presiding officer, if she or he believes that the result of the voice vote is clear, may reject the challenge. When a division occurs, bells are rung through the Assembly premises to attract the attention of members outside the chamber but within the premises. Members then vote through the electronic voting equipment at their desks; the results are then sent to the speaker, who then announces them.

If there is an equality of votes, the speaker or deputy speaker has a casting vote. In Westminster tradition, this casting vote is exercised to allow further debate, if this is possible, or otherwise to avoid a decision being taken without a majority (e.g. voting 'No' to a motion or the third reading of a bill, but 'Yes' to a second reading).

The outcome of most votes is largely known beforehand, since political parties normally instruct members on how to vote. A party normally entrusts some members of the Assembly, known as whips, with the task of ensuring that all party members vote as desired. Members do not tend to vote against such instructions, since those who do so jeopardise promotion, may be deselected as party candidates for future elections, or may be expelled from the party altogether. Ministers, junior ministers and parliamentary private secretaries who vote against the whips' instructions usually resign from their posts. Thus, the independence of non-independent members of the Assembly tends to be low. A member is also traditionally allowed some leeway if the particular interests of his constituency are adversely affected. In some circumstances, however, parties may announce "free votes", allowing members to vote as they please – these are typically on matters of ethics and conscience.

== Membership and elections ==
Constituencies of the Sarawak State Legislative Assembly in 2021.

Sarawak is, as of 2019, divided into 82 state constituencies, each directly electing one member to the Legislative Assembly under the first-past-the-post voting system. The Assembly may legislate to alter the number of members in the Assembly.

The conduct of elections and electoral matters are bound by part 8 of the federal constitution, but other unspecified electoral matters are within the exclusive jurisdiction of the federal government. All elections and boundary determinations are therefore conducted by the federal Election Commission of Malaysia and are not overseen by any state authority.

State elections are triggered whenever the Assembly is dissolved. Dissolution is a prerogative of the governor, but by convention this is only done so on the advice of the premier. Notwithstanding this, the Assembly is automatically dissolved five years after the first sitting following an election.

Any Malaysian resident in Sarawak who are at least age 21 may be elected to the membership of the Assembly, unless they were convicted of an offence in Malaysia that has not been pardoned, are a bankrupt, holding an office of profit (except that of a native chief), are of unsound mind, convicted of electoral fraud or possess voluntary citizenship of another country. Only Malaysian citizens resident in Sarawak, or are last resident in Sarawak if residing outside Malaysia, and are registered on the electoral roll may vote in state elections. Overseas Sarawakians retain the electoral franchise regardless of the duration they are away from the country.

A member is formally styled "Member of the Legislative Assembly" in English and may use the post-nominal letters "MLA". The Malay style is "Ahli Dewan Undangan Negeri" and the post-nominals are "ADUN". Informally and in the media however, they are often titled "state assemblyman" or "state assemblywoman" as appropriate.

=== Eligibility ===
Membership in the Assembly is restricted to Malaysian citizens residing in Sarawak who are at least 21 years old. However, an eligible person may also be temporarily disqualified from election or the membership in several ways.

A person may not sit in the Assembly if they are "of unsound mind" – this has not been tested in recent times. A person is also ineligible while they are an undischarged bankrupt or are holding an office of profit (besides that of a native chief).

A person who has failed to formally lodge a return of election expenses in relation to an election for the Assembly or either chamber of Parliament, or was convicted of an offence anywhere in Malaysia and was sentenced to imprisonment for at least one year or fined at least 2000 Malaysian ringgit and has not been pardoned, or resigned from this Assembly or the Assembly of any other state, are disqualified from the membership for five years from that event (in the case of imprisonment, the disqualification persists until five years after the person is released from custody). The Governor, with the consent of the Chief Minister by convention, may remove the disqualification for the former two.

A person may be disqualified if they have been previously convicted of an electoral offence with respect to elections for the Assembly or Parliament. There is no mechanism to restore eligibility once disqualified under this clause. A person may also be disqualified for voluntarily acquiring or exercising the rights of citizenship in another country – Malaysian citizenship may be lost for doing so as multiple citizenship is not recognised.

An MLA is disqualified from the remainder of an Assembly term if they resigned from the political party that they stood for in the previous election and had voluntarily undertook to the speaker that they would not do so.

Members may concurrently hold membership in both the Assembly and Parliament – they are not required to resign from either legislature.

=== Number of seats and redelineation ===
Redelineation in Sarawak refers to the periodic review and revision of electoral boundaries for state constituencies in the DUNS. Conducted by the Election Commission of Malaysia (EC) under Article 113 and the Thirteenth Schedule of the Federal Constitution, redelineation occurs at intervals of not less than eight years, or following an amendment altering the number of elected members. Under the Dewan Undangan Negeri (Composition of Membership) Ordinance 2025 (Cap. 89), the total number of state constituencies was expanded from 82 to 99 seats, prompting the EC to initiate Sarawak's 7th redelineation exercise.

List of state constituency by parliamentary constituency
Parliamentary constituency		State constituency	
Code	Name	Code	Name
P192	Mas Gading	N01	Opar
P192	Mas Gading	N02	Tasik Biru
P193	Santubong	N03	Tanjong Datu
P193	Santubong	N04	Pantai Damai
P193	Santubong	N05	Demak Laut
P194	Petra Jaya	N06	Tupong
P194	Petra Jaya	N07	Samariang
P194	Petra Jaya	N08	Satok
P195	Bandar Kuching	N09	Padungan
P195	Bandar Kuching	N10	Pending
P195	Bandar Kuching	N11	Batu Lintang
P196	Stampin	N12	Kota Sentosa
P196	Stampin	N13	Batu Kitang
P196	Stampin	N14	Batu Kawah
P197	Kota Samarahan	N15	Asajaya
P197	Kota Samarahan	N16	Muara Tuang
P197	Kota Samarahan	N17	Stakan
P198	Puncak Borneo	N18	Serembu
P198	Puncak Borneo	N19	Mambong
P198	Puncak Borneo	N20	Tarat
P199	Serian	N21	Tebedu
P199	Serian	N22	Kedup
P199	Serian	N23	Bukit Semuja
P200	Batang Sadong	N24	Sadong Jaya
P200	Batang Sadong	N25	Simunjan
P200	Batang Sadong	N26	Gedong
P201	Batang Lupar	N27	Sebuyau
P201	Batang Lupar	N28	Lingga
P201	Batang Lupar	N29	Beting Maro
P202	Sri Aman	N30	Balai Ringin
P202	Sri Aman	N31	Bukit Begunan
P202	Sri Aman	N32	Simanggang
P203	Lubok Antu	N33	Engkilili
P203	Lubok Antu	N34	Batang Ai
P204	Betong	N35	Saribas
P204	Betong	N36	Layar
P204	Betong	N37	Bukit Saban
P205	Saratok	N38	Kalaka
P205	Saratok	N39	Krian
P205	Saratok	N40	Kabong
P206	Tanjong Manis	N41	Kuala Rajang
P206	Tanjong Manis	N42	Semop
P207	Igan	N43	Daro
P207	Igan	N44	Jemoreng
P208	Sarikei	N45	Repok
P208	Sarikei	N46	Meradong
P209	Julau	N47	Pakan
P209	Julau	N48	Meluan
P210	Kanowit	N49	Ngemah
P210	Kanowit	N50	Machan
P211	Lanang	N51	Bukit Assek
P211	Lanang	N52	Dudong
P212	Sibu	N53	Bawang Assan
P212	Sibu	N54	Pelawan
P212	Sibu	N55	Nangka
P213	Mukah	N56	Dalat
P213	Mukah	N57	Tellian
P213	Mukah	N58	Balingian
P214	Selangau	N59	Tamin
P214	Selangau	N60	Kakus
P215	Kapit	N61	Pelagus
P215	Kapit	N62	Katibas
P215	Kapit	N63	Bukit Goram
P216	Hulu Rajang	N64	Baleh
P216	Hulu Rajang	N65	Belaga
P216	Hulu Rajang	N66	Murum
P217	Bintulu	N67	Jepak
P217	Bintulu	N68	Tanjong Batu
P217	Bintulu	N69	Kemena
P217	Bintulu	N70	Samalaju
P218	Sibuti	N71	Bekenu
P218	Sibuti	N72	Lambir
P219	Miri	N73	Piasau
P219	Miri	N74	Pujut
P219	Miri	N75	Senadin
P220	Baram	N76	Marudi
P220	Baram	N77	Telang Usan
P220	Baram	N78	Mulu
P221	Limbang	N79	Bukit Kota
P221	Limbang	N80	Batu Danau
P222	Lawas	N81	Ba'kelalan
P222	Lawas	N82	Bukit Sari

==== List of redelineation ====
Historical Expansion of Constituencies (1867–present)
Year Enacted	Redelineation	State Seats	Election(s) Used	Head of Government
General Council (1867–1902)
1867	-	21	-	Rajah Charles Brooke
Council Negri (1903–1976)
1941	-	25	-	Rajah Vyner Brooke
1956	-	45	1959 (indirect)	British Crown Governor
1963	-	36	1963 (indirect)	Stephen Kalong Ningkan
1968	1st	48	1969	Tawi Sli
1968	1st	48	1974	Abdul Rahman Ya'kub
Dewan Undangan Negeri (1976–present)
1977	2nd	48	1979	Abdul Rahman Ya'kub
1977	2nd	48	1983	Abdul Taib Mahmud
1986	3rd	56	1987 1991	Abdul Taib Mahmud
1996	4th	62	1996 2001	Abdul Taib Mahmud
2006	5th	71	2006 2011	Abdul Taib Mahmud
2014	6th	82	2016	Adenan Satem
2014	6th	82	2021	Abang Johari Openg
2025	7th	99	2026/2027	Abang Johari Openg

== Officers ==
=== Speaker and deputy speaker ===
The governor, on the advice of the chief minister, appoints one person from the membership of the Assembly or, in deviation from traditional Westminster practices, from non-members who are qualified to be elected as members of the Assembly, as the presiding officer of the Assembly, known as the speaker, and another person from the membership of the Assembly to be deputy speaker. The lengths of their service are specified by the letters patent that appointed them; however, their term may end premature if they no longer qualify for the membership of the Assembly, they resign, or the governor terminates their speakership on the advice of the premier. The speaker is also disqualified from the chair if they have any personal interest in another organisation; the deputy speaker does not need to vacate their office if they have such interests, but is barred from presiding over any matter that affects their interests.

The speaker or deputy speaker presides from a chair at the front of the chamber (opposite the entrance). A member who believes that a rule (or standing order) has been breached may raise a point of order, on which the speaker makes a ruling that is not subject to any appeal. The speaker may discipline members who fail to observe the rules of the Assembly. The speaker or deputy speaker remain members of their respective parties while holding the speakership, but they are required by convention to act impartially while presiding over the Assembly. A speaker or deputy speaker who is also an elected member of the Assembly retain voting rights, but by convention does not vote in proceedings they preside over except to break a tie, only doing so according to Speaker Denison's rule.

==== List of speakers ====
Speakers of the Sarawak State Legislative Assembly, 1963–present
Term start	Term end	Speaker	Party	Constituency
1963	1968	Yang Berhormat Dato Doctor Murugasu Sockalingam		
1968	1973	Yang Berhormat Datuk Bandar Tan Sri Dato Sri William Tan Ho Choon	Sarawak Chinese Association	
1973	1976	Yang Berhormat Dato sri Haji Shahbuddin Cheng Yew Kiew @ Cheng Yew Kiew	Sarawak Chinese Association	
1976	1981	Yang Berhormat Tan Sri Dato Sri Abang Abu Bakar Abang Mustapha	BN (PBB)	Satok
1981	1987	Yang Berhormat Tan Sri Dato Sri Celestine Ujang Jilan	BN (PBB)	Kemena
1987	1994	Yang Berhormat Dato Sri Robert Jacob Anak Ridu	BN (PBB)	None
1994	1996	Yang Berhormat Dato Sri Wong Soon Koh	BN (SUPP)	Bawang Assan
1996	2000	Yang Berhormat Datuk Bandar Dato Sri Song swee guan	BN (SUPP)	Padungan
2000	Incumbent	Yang Berhormat Tan Sri Datuk Amar Haji mohamad asfia	BN (PBB)	Serdeng
2000	Incumbent	Yang Berhormat Tan Sri Datuk Amar Haji mohamad asfia	BN (PBB)	Semop
2000	Incumbent	Yang Berhormat Tan Sri Datuk Amar Haji mohamad asfia	BN (PBB)	None
2000	Incumbent	Yang Berhormat Tan Sri Datuk Amar Haji mohamad asfia	GPS (PBB)	None

=== Secretary and deputy secretary ===
The secretary and deputy secretary of the Legislative Assembly are civil servants that serve as the chief advisers of procedural matters, as well as head the day-to-day administration of the Assembly. They serve a similar role to the Clerk of the House of Commons in the United Kingdom, advising the speaker on the rules and procedure of the Assembly, signing orders and official communications, and signing and endorsing bills. They are permanent officials and not members of the Assembly. The Governor has the sole power to appoint or remove them.

=== Other officers ===
The serjeant-at-arms maintains the law, order and security of the Assembly, within the chamber and on the premises of the Assembly building. The serjeant-at-arms also carries the ceremonial mace, a symbol of the authority of the governor and of the Legislative Assembly, into the chamber each day in front of the speaker, and the mace is laid upon the Table of the Assembly during sittings.

== Committees ==
The Legislative Assembly uses committees for a variety of purposes, e.g. for the review of bills. Committees consider bills in detail, and may make amendments. Bills of great constitutional importance, as well as some important financial measures, are usually committed to the Committee of the Whole House, a body that includes all members of the Assembly. This committee sits in the main chamber itself.

Committees can also be created for any purpose – these are known as Select Committees. However, the Select Committees of the Assembly primarily handle administrative matters of the chamber. For example, the Selection and Standing Orders Committee meet to select members of other committees as well as consider changes to the Standing Orders; the Public Petitions Committee handles petitions of any matter from the public; and the Privileges Committee considers questions of parliamentary privilege, as well as matters relating to the conduct of the members. Committees need to be re-established at the beginning of each term.

== List of legislative terms ==
Term	Term began	Election	Members	Cabinet	Governing parties
1st		Appointed			
2nd		Appointed			
3rd		Appointed			
4th		Appointed			
5th		Appointed			
6th	1959	Indirect	24		
7th	1963	Indirect	36	Stephen I (1963–1966)	Sarawak Alliance (SNAP–BARJASA–PESAKA–SCA) (1963–1965); Sarawak Alliance (SNAP–BARJASA–PESAKA–PANAS–SCA) (1965–1966)
7th	1963	Indirect	36	Tawi Sli I (1966)	Sarawak Alliance (PESAKA–BARJASA–PANAS–SCA)
7th	1963	Indirect	36	Stephen II (1966)	SNAP
7th	1963	Indirect	36	Tawi Sli II (1966–1970)	Sarawak Alliance (PESAKA–BARJASA–PANAS–SCA) (1966–1967); Sarawak Alliance (PESAKA–BUMIPUTERA–SCA) (1967–1970)
8th	1970	1969 –1970	48	Rahman I	Sarawak Alliance (PESAKA–BUMIPUTERA)–SUPP (1970–1973)
8th	1970	1969 –1970	48	Rahman I	BN (PBB–SUPP) (1973–1974)
9th	1974		48	Rahman II	BN (PBB–SUPP) (1974–1976); BN (PBB–SUPP–SNAP) (1976–1979)
Council Negri renamed to State Legislative Assembly in 1976.
10th	1979		48	Rahman III (1979–1981); Taib I (1981–1983)	BN (PBB–SUPP–SNAP) (1979–1983); BN (PBB–SUPP–SNAP)–PBDS (1983)
11th	1983		48	Taib II	BN (PBB–SUPP)–PBDS (1983–1984); BN (PBB–SUPP–PBDS–SNAP) (1984–1987)
12th	1987		48	Taib III	BN (PBB–SUPP–SNAP)
13th	1991		56	Taib IV	BN (PBB–SUPP–SNAP) (1991–1994); BN (PBB–SUPP–PBDS–SNAP) (1994–1996)
14th	1996		62	Taib V	BN (PBB–SUPP–PBDS–SNAP)
15th	2001		62	Taib VI	BN (PBB–SUPP–PBDS–SNAP) (2001–2004); BN (PBB–SUPP–PRS–PDP) (2004–2006)
16th	2006		71	Taib VII	BN (PBB–SUPP–PRS–PDP)
17th	2011		71	Taib VIII (2011–2014); Adenan I (2014–2016)	BN (PBB–SUPP–PRS–PDP) (2011–2014); BN (PBB–SUPP–PRS)–TERAS–UPP (2014–2016)
18th	2016		82	Adenan II (2016–2017)	BN (PBB–SUPP–PRS–PDP)–UPP
18th	2016		82	Johari (2017–2021)	BN (PBB–SUPP–PRS–PDP)–UPP (2017–2018)
18th	2016		82	Johari (2017–2021)	GPS (PBB–SUPP–PRS–PDP)–PSB (2018–2019); GPS (PBB–SUPP–PRS–PDP) (2019–2020); GPS (PBB–SUPP–PRS–PDP)–PN (BERSATU) (2020–2021)
19th	2021		82	Johari II	GPS (PBB–SUPP–PRS–PDP) (2021–2023); GPS (PBB–SUPP–PRS–PDP)–PSB (2023–2024); GPS (PBB–SUPP–PRS–PDP) (since 2024)

== See also ==
- Cabinet of Sarawak
