= Progressive Democratic Party (Malaysia) =

Progressive Democratic Party Parti Demokratik Progresif
- Malay name: Parti Demokratik Progresif
- Abbreviation: PDP
- President: Tiong King Sing
- Secretary-General: Anyi Ngau
- Deputy President: Henry Harry Jinep
- Senior Vice Presidents: Wong Soon Koh; Penguang Manggil; Rolland Duat Jubin
- Vice Presidents: Alexander Asing Sadai; Friday Belik; Roland Ting Hua Sing; Johnical Rayong Ngipa; Baru Bian
- Youth Chief: Yiak Chiong Wei
- Women Chief: Wendy Earnest Sadan
- Founder: Peter Nyarok Entrie
- Founded: November 14, 2002 (SPDP) November 14, 2017 (PDP)
- Split from: Sarawak National Party
- Headquarters: Lot 158, 159 & 160, Seksyen 20, KTLD 9F/9G/9H, Jalan Badruddin, 93400 Kuching, Sarawak
- Membership: 298,840 (June 2026)
- Ideology: Conservatism; Sarawak regionalism Nationalism; Multiracial politics Self-determination
- Political position: Centre-right to right-wing
- National affiliation: Gabungan Parti Sarawak (since 2018) (Note: The party was formerly part of the Barisan Nasional (2002–2018), and through GPS was aligned with Perikatan Nasional (2020–2022) and is aligned with Barisan Nasional (since 2018)); National Unity Government (since 2022)
- Colours: Light blue Yellow; Indigo
- Slogan: Perjuangan Rakyat, Sarawak Diutamakan (For the People's Struggle, Sarawak First)
- Dewan Negara: 1 / 70
- Dewan Rakyat: 2 / 31 (Sarawak seats)
- Sarawak State Legislative Assembly: 8 / 82

The Progressive Democratic Party (Malay: Parti Demokratik Progresif, PDP), formerly known as Sarawak Progressive Democratic Party (SPDP), is a Sarawak-based political party in Malaysia. Founded in 2002, the party was formed in the aftermath of an initial deregistration of the Sarawak National Party (SNAP). The party is a founding and principal component of the Gabungan Parti Sarawak (GPS) which governs the state of Sarawak.

== History ==
The party was founded in the wake of the deregistration of the Sarawak National Party (SNAP) in November 2002. Initially named as the Sarawak Progressive Democratic Party (SPDP), it was governed by a faction aligned to the then Chief Minister of Sarawak, Abdul Taib Mahmud, led by William Mawan Ikom. A leadership crisis between Mawan Ikom and Tiong King Sing factions led William Mawan Ikom and entire SPDP state assemblymen to leave SPDP in 2013 for newly founded party TERAS. Tiong King Sing who was then member of Parliament then took control of SPDP.

In 2017, the party rebranded as the Progressive Democratic Party, having planned to expand to certain West Malaysian states, including Selangor, Negeri Sembilan and Johor (where it has established 6 divisions in 2017), although the party remains based and mostly active in Sarawak. It is one of the former component parties of the Barisan Nasional coalition. Following the fall of BN in the 2018 general election, the aftermath of a meeting between Sarawak-based BN component parties on 12 June 2018 resulted in all parties, including the PDP, to leave the coalition. The parties, led by Parti Pesaka Bumiputera Bersatu (PBB), decided to form a Sarawak-based coalition named Gabungan Parti Sarawak (GPS) approximately one month after the election.

In April 2024, Parti Sarawak Bersatu (PSB) was merged into PDP and its members were accepted into PDP, including 3 state assemblymen.

=== Electoral history ===
At the 2011 Sarawak state election, PDP won six out of the eight seats it contested. In the 2013 General Election, all 4 of the party's candidates won their respective seats, including William Mawan himself, where he won in Saratok against Ali Biju of PKR.

At the 2021 Sarawak state election, PDP won five out of the six seats it contested.

== Organisational structure ==
Position	Name
President	Tiong King Sing
Deputy President	Henry Harry Jinep
Senior Vice President(s)	Wong Soon Koh
Senior Vice President(s)	Penguang Manggil
Senior Vice President(s)	Rolland Duat Jubin
Vice President(s)	Alexander Asing Sadai
Vice President(s)	Friday Belik
Vice President(s)	Roland Ting Hua Sing
Vice President(s)	Johnical Rayong Ngipa
Vice President(s)	Baru Bian
Secretary General	Dato Anyi Ngau
PDP Youth Chief	YBrs. Tuan Yiak Chiong Wei
PDP Women Chief	YBhg. Cr Wendy Earnest Sadan
PDP Information Chief	Joshua Ting Fu Ying

== Elected representatives ==
=== Dewan Negara (Senate) ===
==== Senators ====
- Appointed by His Majesty the Yang di-Pertuan Agong
  - Pele Peter Tinggom

=== Dewan Rakyat (House of Representatives) ===
==== Members of Parliament of the 15th Malaysian Parliament ====
PDP has 2 MPs in the House of Representatives.

State	No.	Parliament Constituency	Member	Party
Sarawak	P217	Bintulu	Tiong King Sing	PDP
Sarawak	P220	Baram	Anyi Ngau	PDP
Total	Sarawak (2)			

=== Dewan Undangan Negeri (State Legislative Assembly) ===
==== Malaysian State Assembly Representatives ====
Sarawak State Legislative Assembly

8 / 82

State	No.	Parliamentary Constituency	No.	State Constituency	Member	Party
Sarawak	P192	Mas Gading	N02	Tasik Biru	Henry Harry Jinep	PDP
Sarawak	P203	Lubok Antu	N33	Engkilili	Johnical Rayong Ngipa	PDP
Sarawak	P205	Saratok	N39	Krian	Friday Belik	PDP
Sarawak	P209	Julau	N48	Meluan	Rolland Duat Jubin	PDP
Sarawak	P211	Lanang	N52	Dudong	Tiong King Sing	PDP
Sarawak	P212	Sibu	N53	Bawang Assan	Wong Soon Koh	PDP
Sarawak	P220	Baram	N76	Marudi	Penguang Manggil	PDP
Sarawak	P222	Lawas	N81	Ba'kelalan	Baru Bian	PDP
Total	Sarawak (8)					

== Government offices ==
=== Ministerial posts ===
Portfolio	Office Bearer	Constituency
Minister of Tourism, Arts and Culture	Tiong King Sing	Bintulu

=== State government ===
- Sarawak (2002–2014, 2016–present)

Note: bold as Premier/Chief Minister, italic as junior partner

== Election results ==
=== General election results ===
Election	Total seats won	Seats contested	Total votes	Share of votes	Outcome of election	Election leader
2004	4 / 219	4	50,350	0.72%	▲4 seats; Governing coalition (Barisan Nasional)	William Mawan Ikom
2008	4 / 222	4	52,645	0.66%	; Governing coalition (Barisan Nasional)	William Mawan Ikom
2013	4 / 222	4	55,505	0.50%	; Governing coalition (Barisan Nasional)	William Mawan Ikom
2018	2 / 222	4	59,853	0.50%	▼2 seats; Opposition coalition (Barisan Nasional), later Governing coalition (Gabungan Parti Sarawak)	Tiong King Sing
2022	2 / 222	4	84,045	0.54%	; Governing coalition (Gabungan Parti Sarawak)	Tiong King Sing

=== State election results ===
Sarawak State Legislative Assembly
Election	Votes		Seats			Position (Note: As part of electoral coalition.)	Status
Election	Count	%	Result	Won / contested	+/–	Position	Status
2006	34,737	6.4	8 / 71	8 / 8	▲8	1st (Barisan Nasional)	BN
2011	33,581	5.0	6 / 71	6 / 8	▼2	1st (Barisan Nasional)	BN (Note: No seat, all PDP representatives left for TERAS (2013–2016))
2016	21,846	2.9	3 / 82	3 / 6	▼3	1st (Barisan Nasional)	BN (2016–2018) (Note: BN–UPP (2016–2018))
2016	21,846	2.9	3 / 82	3 / 6	▼3	1st (Barisan Nasional)	GPS (2018–2021) (Note: GPS–PSB (2018–2019), GPS–PN (2020–2021))
2021	35,045	4.7	5 / 82	5 / 6	▲2	1st (Gabungan Parti Sarawak)	GPS (Note: GPS–PSB (2023–2024))
