= Saratok (disambiguation) =

Saratok may refer to:

- Saratok
- Saratok District
- Saratok (federal constituency), represented in the Dewan Rakyat
