= Beduru =

- Location within Borneo
- Coordinates: 1.51667°N 111.51667°E
- Country: Malaysia
- State: Sarawak
- Administrative Division: Saratok
- Elevation: 87 m (285 ft)

Beduru (also known as Bedura) is a longhouse in the Saratok division of Sarawak, Malaysia. It lies approximately 131.9 kilometres (82 mi) east of the state capital Kuching.

Neighbouring settlements include:

- Pelandok 0 kilometres (0.0 mi) north
- Tanjong 1.9 kilometres (1.2 mi) north
- Matop 1.9 kilometres (1.2 mi) north
- Kerangan Pinggai 2.6 kilometres (1.6 mi) northeast
- Belabak 2.6 kilometres (1.6 mi) northeast
- Pelawa 2.6 kilometres (1.6 mi) southwest
- Luban Ulu 3.7 kilometres (2.3 mi) south
- Samu 4.1 kilometres (2.5 mi) northeast
- Bangkit Tengah 4.1 kilometres (2.5 mi) southwest
- Putus 4.1 kilometres (2.5 mi) southwest
