= Matop =

- Location within Borneo
- Coordinates: 1.53333°N 111.51667°E
- Country: Malaysia
- State: Sarawak
- Administrative Division: Spaoh
- Elevation: 88 m (289 ft)

Matop is a settlement in the Spaoh division of Sarawak, Malaysia. It lies approximately 131.8 kilometres (82 mi) east of the state capital Kuching.

Neighbouring settlements include:

- Tanjong 0 kilometres (0.0 mi) north
- Kerangan Pinggai 1.9 kilometres (1.2 mi) east
- Belabak 1.9 kilometres (1.2 mi) east
- Beduru 1.9 kilometres (1.2 mi) south
- Pelandok 1.9 kilometres (1.2 mi) south
- Samu 2.6 kilometres (1.6 mi) northeast
- Udau 4.1 kilometres (2.5 mi) northeast
- Engkerbai 4.1 kilometres (2.5 mi) northeast
- Pelawa 4.1 kilometres (2.5 mi) southwest
- Sengiam 4.1 kilometres (2.5 mi) northeast
