= Udau =

- Location within Borneo
- Coordinates: 1.55°N 111.55°E
- Country: Malaysia
- State: Sarawak
- Administrative Division: Saratok
- Elevation: 105 m (344 ft)

Udau is a settlement in the Saratok division of Sarawak, Malaysia. It lies approximately 135.4 kilometres (84 mi) east of the state capital Kuching.

Neighbouring settlements include:

- Engkerbai 0 kilometres (0.0 mi) north
- Samu 1.9 kilometres (1.2 mi) west
- Sengiam 2.6 kilometres (1.6 mi) northwest
- Lampong 2.6 kilometres (1.6 mi) northeast
- Belabak 2.6 kilometres (1.6 mi) southwest
- Kerangan Pinggai 2.6 kilometres (1.6 mi) southwest
- Matop 4.1 kilometres (2.5 mi) southwest
- Tanjong 4.1 kilometres (2.5 mi) southwest
- Titik 4.1 kilometres (2.5 mi) northwest
- Nanga Bong 4.1 kilometres (2.5 mi) northwest
