= Kerangan Pinggai =

- Location within Borneo
- Coordinates: 1.53333°N 111.53333°E
- Country: Malaysia
- State: Sarawak
- Administrative Division: Saratok
- Elevation: 90 m (300 ft)

Kerangan Pinggai (also known as Krangan Pinggai) is a longhouse on the Paku river in the Saratok division of Sarawak, Malaysia. It lies approximately 133.6 kilometres (83 mi) east of the state capital Kuching.

Benedict Sandin, Iban ethnologist, historian, and Curator of the Sarawak Museum in Kuching was born in Kerangan Pinggai in 1918.

Neighbouring settlements include:

- Belabak 0 kilometres (0.0 mi) north
- Matop 1.9 kilometres (1.2 mi) west
- Tanjong 1.9 kilometres (1.2 mi) west
- Samu 1.9 kilometres (1.2 mi) north
- Beduru 2.6 kilometres (1.6 mi) southwest
- Pelandok 2.6 kilometres (1.6 mi) southwest
- Udau 2.6 kilometres (1.6 mi) northeast
- Engkerbai 2.6 kilometres (1.6 mi) northeast
- Sengiam 3.7 kilometres (2.3 mi) north
- Pelawa 5.2 kilometres (3.2 mi) southwest
