= Benedict Sandin =

Malaysian ethnologist

Benedict Sandin (18 October 1918 – 7 August 1982) was a Malaysian ethnologist and historian, who was Curator of the Sarawak Museum in Kuching, Sarawak from December 1966 to March 1974. He also served as Government Ethnologist to the Government of Sarawak. He wrote many ethnographic articles in the Sarawak Museum Journal and a book entitled "The Sea Dayaks of Borneo: Before White Rajah Rule".

Sandin was an Iban, and was born in Kerangan Pinggai, a longhouse on the Paku river in the Saribas basin of the Betong division of Sarawak.

== Early life ==
Sandin was born Sandin anak Attat, on 18 October 1918 in Kerangan Pinggai, a longhouse on the Paku river in the Saribas basin of the Betong division of Sarawak. Sandin was the oldest of four children of a prominent Iban family. His grandfather was the Native Chief of Lower Paku Iban, from 1875 until his death in 1900.

== Career ==
In 1941, Sandin entered the civil service as a junior Native Officer in the Raj of Sarawak, just before the Japanese occupation of Borneo. After WWII, he was transferred to the Education Department, and later joined the Sarawak Information Office as an Information Officer and worked as editor of the first Iban language news publication for two years.

Hearing of Sandin's talents as a writer, Tom Harrisson, the then Curator of the Sarawak Museum, invited Sandin to join the staff in 1952. After a year's training in New Zealand, he returned to study Iban culture and the native history of Sarawak. In 1966, He became Curator of the Sarawak Museum, and retired from that position in 1973. Following his retirement, he was appointed Senior Fellow at the Universiti Sains Malaysia, in Penang. At the end of this appointment, he returned to Paku, Sarawak, where he continued his research on Iban culture.

Sandin died of lung cancer in August, 1982.

== Legacy ==
Sandin collected and documented the oral histories and oral genealogies of the Iban peoples in the 1930s, 20 years before Derek Freeman's influential studies of Iban social organisations. He made important contributions to the knowledge of the history of the native peoples of Sarawak both before and after the establishment of the Raj of Sarawak by James Brooke. Sandin was best known of his monograph published in 1967 named "The Sea Dayaks of Borneo before White Rajah Rule". "Sources of Iban Traditional History", another monograph authored by Sandin was published in Sarawak Museum Journal in 1994 to supplement his previous monograph published in 1967.

Benedict Sandin together with Tom Harrisson, co-authored an article titled "Borneo Writing Boards" in the Sarawak Museum Journal (SMJ) in 1966 detailing the custom of Iban's people writing boards (papan turai), where different symbols were used dependent on individual writer's as memory aids instead of a regular writing system.

On 18 October 2020, Benedict Sandin's 102nd birthday was featured on Google Doodle to commemorate his contributions in preserving Iban people's native heritage in Sarawak.
