= Nanga Linsum =

- Location within Borneo
- Coordinates: 1.6°N 111.66667°E
- Country: Malaysia
- State: Sarawak
- Elevation: 301 m (988 ft)

Nanga Linsum is a settlement in Sarawak, Malaysia. It lies approximately 148.3 kilometres (92.1 mi) east of the state capital Kuching. Neighbouring settlements include:

- Bagumbang 4.1 kilometres (2.5 mi) southwest
- Jaloh 6.7 kilometres (4.2 mi) southwest
- Kerapa 7.6 kilometres (4.7 mi) south
- Langit 2.6 kilometres (1.6 mi) southwest
- Meroh 8.3 kilometres (5.2 mi) northwest
- Nanga Tiga 3.7 kilometres (2.3 mi) east
- Sungai Langit 3.7 kilometres (2.3 mi) west
