= Titik =

- Location within Borneo
- Coordinates: 1.58333°N 111.53333°E
- Country: Malaysia
- State: Sarawak
- Administrative Division: Saratok
- Elevation: 110 m (360 ft)

Titik is a settlement in the Saratok division of Sarawak, Malaysia. It lies approximately 133.5 kilometres (83 mi) east of the state capital Kuching.

Neighbouring settlements include:

- Belabak 5.6 kilometres (3.5 mi) south
- Danau 4.1 kilometres (2.5 mi) northeast
- Engkerbai 4.1 kilometres (2.5 mi) southeast
- Kerangan Pinggai 5.6 kilometres (3.5 mi) south
- Lampong 4.1 kilometres (2.5 mi) southeast
- Meroh 9.3 kilometres (5.8 mi) northeast
- Nanga Bong 0 kilometres (0.0 mi) north
- Rumah Gara 5.9 kilometres (3.7 mi) west
- Sengiam 1.9 kilometres (1.2 mi) south
- Samu 3.7 kilometres (2.3 mi) south
- Udau 4.1 kilometres (2.5 mi) southeast
