= Pele Peter Tinggom =

Malaysian politician, civil servant, dealer's representative and lawyer

Yang Berhormat Senator Tuan Pele Peter Tinggom PPC PBK

Senator Appointed by the Yang di-Pertuan Agong
- Incumbent
- Assumed office 5 March 2024
- Monarch: Ibrahim
- Prime Minister: Anwar Ibrahim

Personal details
- Born: Pele Peter Tinggom Saratok, Sarawak, Malaysia
- Party: Progressive Democratic Party
- Other political affiliations: Gabungan Parti Sarawak
- Parent: Peter Tinggom Kamarau (father)
- Education: Anglia Ruskin University; Australian Institute of Management
- Occupation: Politician; civil servant; dealer's representative; lawyer

Pele Peter Tinggom is a Malaysian politician, civil servant, dealer's representative and lawyer who has served as a Senator since March 2024.

== Early life and education ==
Pele Peter Tinggom was born in Saratok. He is the son of Peter Tinggom Kamarau, former MP for Saratok. His father served as Deputy Minister of National Unity and Community Development under Prime Minister Mahathir Mohamad from 1995 to 1999.

Pele graduated from Anglia Ruskin University in 1996 with a Bachelor of Laws (Honours). He passed the examination in Accounting, Financial Statement Analysis and Asset Valuation from the Securities Commission Malaysia in 2000. He then obtained a Diploma in Management (Executive) from the Australian Institute of Management (AIM), University of Western Australia in 2002.

== Early career ==
Pele ventured into the legal profession, working with a legal firm in Kuching. Subsequently, he transitioned into the financial services sector, serving as a dealer's representative with Kenanga Investment Bank Berhad (Kenanga IB).

Following his stint in the financial industry, Pele embarked on a career in the civil service, where he held several significant positions within the Sarawak civil service. His roles included serving at the State Financial Secretary's Office, Ministry of Public Utilities Sarawak, Regional Corridor of Development Authority (RECODA), Sarawak State Legislative Assembly, Prime Minister's Department, and Ministry of Utilities Sarawak.

Within the civil service, Pele served as an Assistant Secretary, Parliamentary Officer, Deputy Secretary of the Sarawak State Legislative Assembly from 2011 to 2015, and ultimately as Secretary of Sarawak State Legislative Assembly from 2019 to 2024.

== Senator ==
On 3 March, Pele confirmed his swearing-in as a Senator. On 5 March, he retired early from his role as Secretary of Sarawak State Legislative Assembly, and was sworn in as a Senator on the same day in Dewan Negara. He is a senator appointed by the Yang di-Pertuan Agong, Sultan Ibrahim.

== Honours ==
=== Honours of Malaysia ===
- Malaysia
  - Recipient of the 17th Yang di-Pertuan Agong Installation Medal
- Sarawak
  - Distinguished Service Medal – Gold (PPC)
  - Officer of the Order of the Star of Hornbill Sarawak (PBK) (2022)
  - Bronze Medal of the Sarawak Independence Diamond Jubilee Medal (2024)
