= Ulu Anyut =

Location in Sarawak

Lingit longhouse, Ulu Anyut.

Ulu Anyut is the sub-area of Ulu Paku, Spaoh, Betong District, Betong Division, Sarawak, Malaysia. It is primarily an Iban area with a few small longhouses. Ulu Anyut areas consists of the longhouses:

- Lingit
- Sungai Rian (Occupants originally from Udau)
- Udau
- Blabak Jitu
- Blabak Nanam
- Engkrebai
- Lempaong

Ulu Anyut gets its name from the Anyut River flowing through this area.

== See also ==
- Austronesian languages
- Austronesian peoples
- Gawai Dayak
