= Lawing, Sarawak =

Lawing
- Location within Borneo
- Coordinates: 1.45°N 111.58333°E
- Country: Malaysia
- State: Sarawak
- Administrative Division: Betong
- Elevation: 98 m (322 ft)

Lawing is a settlement in the Betong division of Sarawak, Malaysia. It lies approximately 139.9 kilometres (87 mi) east of the state capital Kuching.

Neighbouring settlements include:

- Melayu 1.9 kilometres (1.2 mi) west
- Rian Batang 1.9 kilometres (1.2 mi) west
- Engkabang 1.9 kilometres (1.2 mi) east
- Engkeranji 2.6 kilometres (1.6 mi) northwest
- Dabok 2.6 kilometres (1.6 mi) northwest
- Sekatap 2.6 kilometres (1.6 mi) northwest
- Sekuyat 2.6 kilometres (1.6 mi) southwest
