= Ulu Paku =

- Area
- Location within Sarawak Location within East Malaysia Location within Malaysia
- Coordinates: 1°33′00″N 111°31′49″E
- Country: Malaysia
- State: Sarawak
- Division: Betong
- District: Betong
- Sub-district: Spaoh
- Time zone: UTC+8 (MYT)
- Postal code: 94000

Map of Ulu Paku Road.

Ulu Paku is an area in the small sub-district of Spaoh, Betong Division, Sarawak, Malaysia. It is a primarily native Iban area. It is made up of 11 Iban longhouses (not including Anyut area). The longhouses here, despite being called longhouses are relatively short with the longest being only around 25 biliks or houses. The longhouses are:

1. Kerangan Pinggai
2. Anyut (sub-area of Ulu Paku)
3. Samu
4. Jukun
5. Sapuna
6. Nanga Bong
7. Danau
8. Senunok
9. Penom
10. Lubuk Kelampu (Meroh Ili)
11. Nanga Paun (Meroh Ulu)
