= Langit =

- Location within Borneo
- Coordinates: 1.58333°N 111.65°E
- Country: Malaysia
- State: Sarawak
- Elevation: 277 m (909 ft)

Langit is a settlement in Sarawak, Malaysia. It lies approximately 146.5 kilometres (91.0 mi) east of the state capital Kuching. Neighbouring settlements include:

- Bagumbang 1.9 kilometres (1.2 mi) west
- Kerapa 6.7 kilometres (4.2 mi) southeast
- Meroh 7.9 kilometres (4.9 mi) northwest
- Nanga Linsum 2.6 kilometres (1.6 mi) northeast
- Nanga Tiga 5.9 kilometres (3.7 mi) east
- Penyalaneh Kanan 5.2 kilometres (3.2 mi) southwest
- Penyalaneh Kiri 5.2 kilometres (3.2 mi) southwest
- Sungai Kepayang 1.9 kilometres (1.2 mi) north
- Sungai Langit 2.6 kilometres (1.6 mi) northwest
- Sungai Tipus 0 kilometres (0.0 mi) north
- Temedak 5.6 kilometres (3.5 mi) south
