= Balasau =

- Location within Borneo
- Coordinates: 1.6°N 111.4°E
- Country: Malaysia
- State: Sarawak
- Elevation: 110 m (360 ft)

Balasau (also known as Rumah Manggoi or Belasau) is a settlement in Sarawak, Malaysia. It lies approximately 118.7 kilometres (74 mi) east of the state capital Kuching.

Neighbouring settlements include:

- Belok 1.9 kilometres (1.2 mi) west
- Rumah Luong 1.9 kilometres (1.2 mi) south
- Rapong 2.6 kilometres (1.6 mi) northeast
- Isu 2.6 kilometres (1.6 mi) northwest
- Sabar 2.6 kilometres (1.6 mi) southeast
- Terai 2.6 kilometres (1.6 mi) southeast
- Debak 2.6 kilometres (1.6 mi) southeast
- Loget 3.7 kilometres (2.3 mi) north
- Rumah Garit 3.7 kilometres (2.3 mi) south
- Dit 4.1 kilometres (2.5 mi) southwest
