= Meroh =

- Location within Borneo
- Coordinates: 1.63333°N 111.6°E
- Country: Malaysia
- State: Sarawak
- Administrative Division: Saratok
- Elevation: 262 m (860 ft)

Meroh is a settlement in the Saratok division of Sarawak, Malaysia. It lies approximately 141 kilometres (88 mi) east of the state capital Kuching.

Neighbouring settlements include:

- Penom 2.6 kilometres (1.6 mi) southwest
- Danau 5.2 kilometres (3.2 mi) southwest
- Sungai Langit 5.2 kilometres (3.2 mi) southeast
- Sungai Kepayang 6.7 kilometres (4.2 mi) southeast
- Bagumbang 6.7 kilometres (4.2 mi) southeast
- Sungai Tipus 7.9 kilometres (4.9 mi) southeast
- Langit 7.9 kilometres (4.9 mi) southeast
- Nanga Linsum 8.3 kilometres (5.2 mi) southeast
- Lampong 8.3 kilometres (5.2 mi) southwest
- Titik 9.3 kilometres (5.8 mi) southwest
