= Jelaing Mersat =

Malaysian politician (1948–2023)

Jelaing Mersat JBS ABS

Deputy Minister of Transport
- In office 4 June 2010 – 15 May 2013 Serving with Abdul Rahim Bakri
- Monarchs: Mizan Zainal Abidin; Abdul Halim
- Prime Minister: Najib Razak
- Minister: Kong Cho Ha
- Preceded by: Robert Lau Hoi Chew
- Succeeded by: Abdul Aziz Kaprawi
- Constituency: Saratok

Deputy Minister of Home Affairs
- In office 10 April 2009 – 4 June 2010 Serving with Abu Seman Yusop
- Monarch: Mizan Zainal Abidin
- Prime Minister: Najib Razak
- Minister: Hishammuddin Hussein
- Preceded by: Chor Chee Heung
- Succeeded by: Lee Chee Leong
- Constituency: Saratok

Deputy Minister of Domestic Trade and Consumer Affairs
- In office 19 March 2008 – 9 April 2009
- Monarch: Mizan Zainal Abidin
- Prime Minister: Abdullah Ahmad Badawi
- Minister: Shahrir Abdul Samad
- Preceded by: S. Veerasingam
- Succeeded by: Tan Lian Hoe as Deputy Minister of Domestic Trade, Co-operatives and Consumerism
- Constituency: Saratok

Member of the Malaysian Parliament for Saratok, Sarawak
- In office 21 March 2004 – 5 May 2013
- Preceded by: Peter Tinggom Kamarau (BN–SPDP)
- Succeeded by: William Mawan Ikom (BN–SPDP)
- Majority: 7,545 (2004); 8,706 (2008)

Personal details
- Born: 31 December 1948 Crown Colony of Sarawak
- Died: 1 September 2023 (aged 74)
- Party: Sarawak Progressive Democratic Party (SPDP)
- Other political affiliations: Barisan Nasional (BN)
- Occupation: Politician

Jelaing Mersat (31 December 1948 – 1 September 2023) was a Malaysian politician who was a Member of Parliament for the Saratok constituency in Sarawak from 2004 until 2013, representing the Sarawak Progressive Democratic Party (SPDP). During his time in Parliament he served as Deputy Home Minister in the Barisan Nasional coalition government, and later as Deputy Minister for Transport.

Jelaing was elected to Parliament in the 2004 election, replacing Peter Tinggom as the SPDP's Barisan Nasional candidate for the Saratok seat. He had been a staffer to Tinggom while the latter was a Deputy Minister. Jelaing was dropped as the Barisan Nasional's candidate for the 2013 election, in favour of SPDP president William Mawan Ikom. Jelaing and a group of his supporters within the SPDP protested against his replacement and refused to support Mawan's candidacy.

== Death ==
Jelaing Mersat died on 1 September 2023, at the age of 74.

== Election results ==
Parliament of Malaysia
Year	Constituency	Candidate	Votes	Pct	Opposnent(s)	Votes	Pct	Ballots cast	Majority	Turnout
2004	P205 Saratok	Jelaing Mersat (SPDP)	11,995	72.94%	Edmund Stanley Jugol (SNAP)	4,450	27.06%	16,684	7,545	67.80%
2008	P205 Saratok	Jelaing Mersat (SPDP)	12,470	76.81%	Mohd Yahya Abdullah (PKR)	3,764	23.19%	16,467	8,706	68.66%

== Honours ==
- Sarawak
  - Companion of the Most Exalted Order of the Star of Sarawak (JBS) (2009)
  - Member of the Most Exalted Order of the Star of Sarawak (ABS) (2003)
