= Meluan =

Meluan may refer to:

- Meluan (state constituency), represented in the Sarawak State Legislative Assembly
- Meluan, a coaster in service 1947-55
