= Pakan (state constituency) =

Electoral district in Sarawak, Malaysia

Pakan (N47)
Sarawak constituency

State constituency
- Legislature: Sarawak State Legislative Assembly
MLA
Vacant
- Constituency created: 1968
- First contested: 1969
- Last contested: 2026

Pakan is a state constituency in Sarawak, Malaysia, that has been represented in the Sarawak State Legislative Assembly since 1969.

The state constituency was created in the 1968 redistribution and is mandated to return a single member to the Sarawak State Legislative Assembly under the first past the post voting system.

== Demographics ==
Ethnic breakdown of Pakan's electorate as of 2022
1. Sarawak bumiputera (91.9%)
2. Chinese (6.60%)
3. Malay-Muslim bumiputera (0.80%)
4. Other ethnicities (0.97%)

== History ==
As of 2020, Pakan has a population of 17,175 people.

=== Polling districts ===
According to the gazette issued on 31 October 2022, the Pakan constituency has a total of 6 polling districts.

State constituency	Polling Districts	Code	Location
Pakan (N47)	Bayong	209/47/01	SK Balong Sg. Rian; SK Udin Ng. Bayong; RH Andrew Mangka Sg. Ribong; RH Tirai Sebangkoi
Pakan (N47)	Sungai Rusa	209/47/02	SK Penghulu Anding; SJK (C) Su Dok
Pakan (N47)	Babai	209/47/03	RH Budum Ng. Tubai Buah; SJK (C) Su Dok; RH Budim Ng Tubai Buah; SK Ulu Pedanum; SK Ng. Buku; SK Babai
Pakan (N47)	Lamujan	209/47/04	SK Ng. Pakan; SK Ulu Manding; SK Sg. Sugai
Pakan (N47)	Wuak	209/47/05	RH Julius Duat Maur @ Julius Edward; SK Ng. Kedup; RH Mandau Sg. Marau Pakan; SK Ng. Wuak
Pakan (N47)	Dayu	209/47/06	SK Ng. Kota; SK Ng. Wak; SK Ng. Dayu; SK Ng. Kara; SK Ng. Sembawang; RH Ko Ak Changgan Sg. Balong

=== Representation history ===
Members of the Legislative Assembly for Pakan
Assembly	No	Years	Member	Party
Constituency created
8th	N33	1970-1974	Mandi Sanar	PESAKA
9th	N33	1974-1979	Jawie Wilson Masing	SNAP
10th	N33	1979-1983	Jawie Wilson Masing	BN (SNAP)
11th	N33	1983-1987	Jawie Wilson Masing	PBDS
12th	N33	1987-1991	Jawie Wilson Masing	PBDS
13th	N33	1991-1996	William Mawan Ikom	BN (SNAP)
14th	N35	1996-2001	William Mawan Ikom	BN (SNAP)
15th	N35	2001-2002	William Mawan Ikom	BN (SNAP)
15th	N35	2002-2006	William Mawan Ikom	BN (PDP)
16th	N41	2006-2011	William Mawan Ikom	BN (PDP)
17th	N41	2011-2014	William Mawan Ikom	BN (PDP)
17th	N41	2014-2016	William Mawan Ikom	TERAS
18th	N47	2016-2018	William Mawan Ikom	BN (PBB)
18th	N47	2018-2021	William Mawan Ikom	GPS (PBB)
19th	N47	2021–2026	William Mawan Ikom	GPS (PBB)

== Election results ==
Sarawak state election, 2026
Party	Candidate	Votes	%	∆%
GPS				▲
PH				▲
Total valid votes				
Total rejected ballots				
Unreturned ballots				
Turnout				
Registered electors				
Majority				

Sarawak state election, 2021
Party	Candidate	Votes	%	∆%
GPS	William Mawan Ikom	3,268	41.13	▲41.13
Independent	Jamal Abdullah @ Tedong Chakaw @ Gunda	2,554	32.15	▼13.33
PSB	Hereward Gramong Joseph Allen	1,484	18.68	▲18.68
Independent	Brawi Angguong	506	6.37	▲6.37
PBK	Jemeli Kerah	133	1.67	▲1.67
Total valid votes		7,945	100.00	
Total rejected ballots		98		
Unreturned ballots		16		
Turnout		8,059	72.25	▼5.19
Registered electors		11,154		
Majority		714	8.99	▲3.57
GPS gain from BN		Swing		?
Source(s) https://lom.agc.gov.my/ilims/upload/portal/akta/outputp/1718688/PUB687.pdf

Sarawak state election, 2016
Party	Candidate	Votes	%	∆%
BN	William Mawan Ikom	3,999	50.90	▼8.06
Independent	Jawie Jingot @ Jenggot	3,573	45.48	▲45.48
DAP	Rinda Juliza Alexander	285	3.63	▲3.63
Total valid votes		7,857	100.00	
Total rejected ballots		128		
Unreturned ballots		8		
Turnout		7,993	77.44	▲4.28
Registered electors		10,322		
Majority		426	5.42	▼12.50
BN hold		Swing		
Source(s) "Federal Government Gazette - Notice of Contested Election, State Legislative Assembly of the State of Sarawak [P.U. (B) 190/2016]" (PDF). Attorney General's Chambers of Malaysia. 25 April 2016. Archived from the original (PDF) on 12 June 2017. "Senarai Calon yang Disahkan Layak Bertanding Pilihan Raya Dewan Undangan Negeri ke-11". Election Commission of Malaysia. 25 April 2016. Archived from the original on 25 April 2016.

Sarawak state election, 2011
Party	Candidate	Votes	%	∆%
BN	William Mawan Ikom	3,938	58.96	▼4.57
SNAP	Jamal Abdullah @ Tedong Chakaw @ Gunda	2,741	41.04	▲4.57
Total valid votes		6,679	100.00	
Total rejected ballots		83		
Unreturned ballots		23		
Turnout		6,785	73.16	▲0.01
Registered electors		9,274		
Majority		1,197	17.92	▼9.15
BN hold		Swing		
Source(s) "Federal Government Gazette - Results of Contested Election and Statements of the Poll after the Official Addition of Votes Sarawak [P.U. (B) 245/2011]" (PDF). Attorney General's Chambers of Malaysia. 29 April 2011.

Sarawak state election, 2006
Party	Candidate	Votes	%	∆%
BN	William Mawan Ikom	4,138	63.53	▼2.99
SNAP	Boos Tutong @ Kirai	2,375	36.47	▲36.47
Total valid votes		6,513	100.00	
Total rejected ballots		95		
Unreturned ballots		1		
Turnout		6,609	73.15	▼0.20
Registered electors		9,034		
Majority		1,763	27.07	▼9.04
BN hold		Swing		

Sarawak state election, 2001
Party	Candidate	Votes	%	∆%
BN	William Mawan Ikom	4,242	66.52	▲13.51
Independent	Megong Grek	1,940	30.42	▲30.42
Independent	Samuel Edward Chun	195	3.06	▼43.93
Total valid votes		6,377	100.00	
Total rejected ballots		76		
Unreturned ballots		0		
Turnout		6,453	73.35	▼0.44
Registered electors		8,798		
Majority		2,302	36.10	▲30.07
BN hold		Swing		

Sarawak state election, 1996
Party	Candidate	Votes	%	∆%
BN	William Mawan Ikom	2,903	53.01	▼2.97
Independent	Samuel Edward Chun	2,573	46.99	▲46.99
Total valid votes		5,476	100.00	
Total rejected ballots		138		
Unreturned ballots		0		
Turnout		5,614	73.79	▼5.18
Registered electors		7,608		
Majority		330	6.03	▼5.92
BN hold		Swing		

Sarawak state election, 1991
Party	Candidate	Votes	%	∆%
BN	William Mawan Ikom	2,787	55.98	▲8.76
PBDS	Jawie Wilson Masing	2,192	44.02	▼8.76
Total valid votes		4,979	100.00	
Total rejected ballots		69		
Unreturned ballots		6		
Turnout		5,054	78.97	▼2.28
Registered electors		6,400		
Majority		595	11.95	▲6.40
BN gain from PBDS		Swing		?

Sarawak state election, 1987
Party	Candidate	Votes	%	∆%
PBDS	Jawie Wilson Masing	2,453	52.78	▲2.05
BN	William Mawan Ikom	2,195	47.22	▲2.98
Total valid votes		4,648	100.00	
Total rejected ballots		68		
Unreturned ballots		0		
Turnout		4,716	81.25	▲4.41
Registered electors		5,804		
Majority		258	5.55	▼0.94
PBDS hold		Swing		

Sarawak state election, 1983
Party	Candidate	Votes	%	∆%
PBDS	Jawie Wilson Masing	2,040	50.73	▲50.73
SNAP	William Mawan Ikom	1,779	44.24	▼18.42
Independent	Kasa Jingga	202	5.02	▲5.02
Total valid votes		4,021	100.00	
Total rejected ballots		73		
Unreturned ballots		0		
Turnout		4,094	76.84	▲6.04
Registered electors		5,328		
Majority		261	6.49	▼30.51
PBDS gain from BN		Swing		?

Sarawak state election, 1979
Party	Candidate	Votes	%	∆%
BN	Jawie Wilson Masing	2,281	68.50	▲5.84
Independent	Jagok Mandi	1,049	31.50	▼5.84
Total valid votes		3,330	100.00	
Total rejected ballots		78		
Unreturned ballots		0		
Turnout		3,408	70.93	▼3.66
Registered electors		4,805		
Majority		1,232	37.00	▲11.65
BN gain from SNAP		Swing		?

Sarawak state election, 1974
Party	Candidate	Votes	%	∆%
SNAP	Jawie Wilson Masing	1,896	62.68	▲34.85
BN	Jagok Mandi	1,129	37.32	▲37.32
Total valid votes		3,025	100.00	
Total rejected ballots		290		
Unreturned ballots		0		
Turnout		3,315	74.58	▲3.85
Registered electors		4,445		
Majority		767	25.36	▲22.40
SNAP gain from PESAKA		Swing		?

Sarawak state election, 1969
Party	Candidate	Votes	%
PESAKA	Mandi Sanar	748	31.21
Independent	Lau Mee Ee	677	28.24
SNAP	Dundang Ibi	667	27.83
Independent	Laiyau Boleng	305	12.72
Total valid votes		2,397	100.00
Total rejected ballots		327	
Unreturned ballots		0	
Turnout		2,724	70.73
Registered electors		3,851	
Majority		71	2.96
This was a new constituency created.
