= Spaoh =

- Location within Borneo
- Coordinates: 1°30′0″N 111°30′0″E
- Country: Malaysia
- State: Sarawak

Population
  - Total: 14,890

Spaoh is a small town and a sub-district in Betong District, Betong Division in the state of Sarawak, Malaysia. Formerly this sub-district area was known as Saribas District, the old name for what is now called Spaoh District in the state of Sarawak, Malaysia. The name derives from the Saribas river flowing through the Spaoh district.

Geographically (not administratively), Spaoh is divided into areas such as Ili Pasar Spaoh (Spaoh downriver), Buda Area, Paku Ili (Brutan), Ulu Paku and Ulu Anyut.

== History ==
Small Spaoh was established by the Chinese People Hakka Chinese in 1946. Back then, there were four blocks of shops, with eight shops in each block.

These four blocks of shops encircled Spaoh Wharf. Presently, the Spaoh town still consists of these four block of shops.

== Economy ==
The town throve in the 1960s following the boom in rubber prices. Rubber products were shipped out from Spaoh to Kuching via the small settlement of Pusa. By the 1970s, the town's economy started to decline due to competition from other towns and settlements nearly especially Debak Town.
