= William Mawan Ikom =

Malaysian politician

Yang Berhormat Tan Sri Dato Sri William Mawan Ikom PSM PNBS PGBK PBS AMN MLA

Advisor in the Office of the Premier of Sarawak for Food Industries, Commodities and Regional Development
- Incumbent
- Assumed office 2023
- Governor: Abdul Taib Mahmud (2023-2024); Wan Junaidi Tuanku Jaafar (since 2024)
- Premier: Abang Johari
- Preceded by: Position established

Minister of Social Development and Urbanisation
- In office 2008–2016
- Governor: Abang Muhammad Salahuddin (2008-2014); Abdul Taib Mahmud (2014-2016)
- Chief Minister: Abdul Taib Mahmud (2008-2014); Adenan Satem (2014-2016)
- Preceded by: James Wong Kim Min
- Succeeded by: Michael Manyin

Member of the Sarawak State Legislative Assembly for Pakan
- Incumbent
- Assumed office 1991
- Preceded by: Jawie Wilson Masing

Member of the Malaysian Parliament for Saratok
- In office 2013–2018
- Preceded by: Jelaing Mersat
- Succeeded by: Ali Biju

Personal details
- Born: William Mawan anak Ikom; 1 December 1949 (age 76) Sarawak
- Citizenship: Malaysian
- Party: SNAP (till 2002); SPDP (2002-2013); TERAS (2013-2016); PBB (since 2016)
- Other political affiliations: Barisan Nasional (till 2013, 2016-2018); Gabungan Parti Sarawak (since 2018)
- Spouse: Julia Mawan
- Occupation: Politician

William Mawan anak Ikom is a Malaysian politician from PBB. He has served as the Member of the Sarawak State Legislative Assembly for Pakan since 1991, and Member of Parliament for Saratok from 2013 to 2018. He is currently the Advisor in the Office of the Premier of Sarawak for Food Industries, Commodities and Regional Development. He also served as Sarawak Minister of Environment and Public Health from 2002 to 2004, Minister of Social Development and Urbanisation from 2008 to 2016.

== Political career ==
William was the founder and President of SPDP. In 2013, there was a dispute between him and the then-Deputy President of SPDP, Tiong King Sing. William quit SPDP and founded TERAS, and served as President. In 2016, he quit TERAS to become a direct member of BN. In the same year, he joined PBB.

== Election results ==
Parliament of Malaysia
Year	Constituency	Candidate	Votes	Pct.	Opponent(s)	Votes	Pct.	Ballots cast	Majority	Turnout
1990	P169 Julau	William Mawan Ikom (IND)	5,421	47.94%	Thomas Salang Siden (PBDS)	5,886	52.06%	11,573	465	79.15%
2013	P205 Saratok	William Mawan Ikom (SPDP)	11,600	53.21%	Ali Biju (PKR)	9,519	43.67%	22,136	2,081	80.31%
2013	P205 Saratok	William Mawan Ikom (SPDP)	11,600	53.21%	Roseli Paleng (IND)	681	3.12%	22,136	2,081	80.31%

Sarawak State Legislative Assembly
Year	Constituency	Candidate	Votes	Pct.	Opponent(s)	Votes	Pct.	Ballots cast	Majority	Turnout
1983	N33 Pakan	William Mawan Ikom (SNAP)	1,779	44.24%	Jawie Wilson Masing (PBDS)	2,040	50.73%	4,094	261	76.84%
1983	N33 Pakan	William Mawan Ikom (SNAP)	1,779	44.24%	Kasa Jingga (IND)	202	5.02%	4,094	261	76.84%
1987	N33 Pakan	William Mawan Ikom (SNAP)	2,195	47.22%	Jawie Wilson Masing (PBDS)	2,453	52.78%	4,716	258	81.25%
1991	N33 Pakan	William Mawan Ikom (SNAP)	2,787	55.98%	Jawie Wilson Masing (PBDS)	2,192	44.02%	5,054	595	78.97%
1996	N35 Pakan	William Mawan Ikom (SNAP)	2,903	53.01%	Samuel Edward Chun (IND)	2,573	46.99%	5,614	330	73.79%
2001	N35 Pakan	William Mawan Ikom (SPDP)	4,242	66.52%	Megong Grek (IND)	1,940	30.42%	6,453	2,303	73.35%
2001	N35 Pakan	William Mawan Ikom (SPDP)	4,242	66.52%	Samuel Edward Chun (IND)	195	3.06%	6,453	2,303	73.35%
2006	N41 Pakan	William Mawan Ikom (SPDP)	4,138	63.53%	Boos Tutong @ Kirai (SNAP)	2,375	36.47%	6,609	1,763	73.15%
2011	N41 Pakan	William Mawan Ikom (SPDP)	3,938	58.96%	Jamal Abdullah @ Tedong Chakaw @ Gunda (SNAP)	2,741	41.04%	6,785	1,197	73.16%
2016	N47 Pakan	William Mawan Ikom (BN Direct)	3,999	50.90%	Jawie Jingot @ Jenggot (IND)	3,573	45.48%	7,993	426	77.44%
2016	N47 Pakan	William Mawan Ikom (BN Direct)	3,999	50.90%	Rinda Juliza Alexander (DAP)	285	3.63%	7,993	426	77.44%
2021	N47 Pakan	William Mawan Ikom (PBB)	3,268	41.13%	Jamal Abdullah @ Tedong Chakaw @ Gunda (IND)	2,554	32.15%	8,059	714	72.25%
2021	N47 Pakan	William Mawan Ikom (PBB)	3,268	41.13%	Hereward Gramong Joseph Allen (PSB)	1,484	18.68%	8,059	714	72.25%
2021	N47 Pakan	William Mawan Ikom (PBB)	3,268	41.13%	Brawi Angguong (IND)	506	6.37%	8,059	714	72.25%
2021	N47 Pakan	William Mawan Ikom (PBB)	3,268	41.13%	Jemeli Kerah (PBK)	133	1.67%	8,059	714	72.25%

== Honours ==
- Malaysia
  - Commander of the Order of Loyalty to the Crown of Malaysia (PSM) – Tan Sri (2011)
  - Member of the Order of the Defender of the Realm (AMN) (1990)
- Sarawak
  - Knight Commander of the Most Exalted Order of the Star of Sarawak (PNBS) – Dato Sri (2006)
  - Commander of the Order of the Star of Hornbill Sarawak (PGBK) – Datuk (2000)
  - Officer of the Most Exalted Order of the Star of Sarawak (PBS) (1996)
