= List of high commissioners of Malaysia to New Zealand =

High Commissioner of Malaysia to New Zealand
- Incumbent; Nur Izzah Wong Mee Choo since 1 February 2018
- Style: His Excellency
- Seat: Wellington, New Zealand
- Appointer: Yang di-Pertuan Agong
- Inaugural holder: Lim Taik Choon
- Formation: 9 December 1969
- Website: www.kln.gov.my/web/nzl_wellington/home

The high commissioner of Malaysia to New Zealand is the head of Malaysia's diplomatic mission to New Zealand. The position has the rank and status of an ambassador extraordinary and plenipotentiary and is based in the High Commission of Malaysia, Wellington.

== List of heads of mission ==
=== High commissioners to New Zealand ===
High Commissioner	Term start	Term end
Lim Taik Choon	9 December 1969	3 April 1972
John Denis de Silva	11 August 1972	24 August 1974
K. Tharmaratnam	11 December 1974	24 June 1978
Mohamed Yusof Hitam	25 October 1978	20 May 1980
Dunstan Endawie Enchana	16 July 1980	15 May 1982
M. M. Sathiah	31 May 1982	9 April 1986
Mohammad Zain Mohammad Salleh	29 May 1986	1 May 1989
Anaitullah E.A. Karim	23 August 1989	17 January 1992
Tunku Nazihah Tunku Mohd Rus	16 June 1992	9 April 1995
Daniel Tajem Miri	14 September 1995	3 July 2000
Zulkifly Ab. Rahman	26 September 2000	17 March 2004
Sopian Ahmad	17 September 2004	19 December 2008
Hasnudin Hamzah	29 March 2009	5 August 2011
Mazlan Muhammad	16 August 2011	15 April 2012
Rosmidah Zahid	16 July 2012	29 September 2014
Lim Kim Eng	10 October 2014	12 September 2017
Nur Izzah Wong Mee Choo	1 February 2018	Incumbent

== See also ==
- Malaysia–New Zealand relations
