= Dewan Negara =

Upper house of the Parliament of Malaysia

Senate Dewan Negara ديوان نڬارا
- 15th Parliament

Type
- Type: Upper house of the Parliament of Malaysia

History
- Founded: 11 September 1959

Leadership
- President: Awang Bemee Awang Ali Basah, GPS–PBB since 22 July 2024
- Deputy President: Nur Jazlan Mohamed, BN–UMNO since 19 June 2023
- Secretary: Muhd Sujairi Abdullah since 22 February 2020

Structure
- Seats: 70
- Political groups: As of 11 September 2026 Government (48) PH (20): PKR (10); DAP (8); AMANAH (2); BN (11): UMNO (8); MCA (3); GPS (6): PBB (3); PRS (1); PDP (1); SUPP (1); GRS (3): GAGASAN (2); UPKO (1); STAR (1) Independent (7) Opposition (8) PN (8): PAS (7); WAWASAN (1); Vacant (14)
- Committees: 4: Selection Committee; House Committee; Committee on Rights and Freedoms; Meeting Rules Committee
- Length of term: Up to 3 years, renewable once

Meeting place
- Dewan Negara Chamber; Malaysian Houses of Parliament, Kuala Lumpur, Malaysia

Website
- Official website

The Dewan Negara (English: Senate, lit. 'State Council'; Jawi: ديوان نڬارا) is the upper house of the Parliament of Malaysia, consisting of 70 senators of whom 26 are elected by the state legislative assemblies, with two senators for each state, while the other 44 are appointed by the Yang di-Pertuan Agong (King of Malaysia), including four who are appointed to represent the federal territories.

The Dewan Negara usually reviews legislation that has been passed by the lower house, the Dewan Rakyat. All bills must usually be passed by both the Dewan Rakyat and the Dewan Negara (the Senate), before they are sent to the Agong for royal assent. However, if the Dewan Negara rejects a bill, it can only delay the bill's passage by a maximum of a year before it is sent to the King, a restriction similar to that placed on the House of Lords in the United Kingdom. Like the Dewan Rakyat, the Dewan Negara meets at the Malaysian Houses of Parliament in Kuala Lumpur.

Originally, the Dewan Negara was meant to act as a check on the Dewan Rakyat and represent the interests of the various states, based on the role played by its counterpart in the United States. However, the original constitution, which provided for a majority of state-elected senators, has since been modified to make the vast majority of senators instead appointed by the Agong, thus theoretically providing an avenue for a relatively non-partisan reconsideration of bills, more similar to the role of the British House of Lords.

== Membership ==
Members of the Dewan Negara are referred to as "Senators" in English or "Ahli Dewan Negara" (lit. 'member of the Dewan Negara') in Malay and are accorded the honorific style of Yang Berhormat Senator. The term of office is three years and senators may only be re-appointed once, consecutively or non-consecutively.

Each of the 13 state legislative assemblies chooses two senators. The King of Malaysia appoints two senators for the Federal Territory of Kuala Lumpur, and one respectively for the Federal Territories of Labuan and Putrajaya, all these at-large appointments on the advice of the prime minister.

Another 40 senators, regardless of their states, are appointed by the King, also on the prime minister's advice. Federally appointed senators must have "rendered distinguished public service or have achieved distinction in the professions, commerce, industry, agriculture, cultural activities or social service or are representative of racial minorities or are capable of representing the interests of aborigines (Orang Asli)". Two senators are appointed to represent the Orang Asli, and two others to represent Malaysian Siamese.

The intent of the original Constitution of Malaysia, which provided for only 16 senators to be appointed by the King (thus placing them in the minority) was to give the states some say over federal policy. However, subsequent amendments have, according to Lord President of the Federal Court Tun Mohamed Suffian Mohamed Hashim, acted "contrary to the spirit of the original constitution which established the Dewan Negara specially as a body to protect in the federal Parliament, state interests against federal encroachments". The original drafters envisioned the number of central appointees decreasing, perhaps to none, rather than increasing. In practice, the Senate rarely debates, let alone rejects, bills passed by the lower house.

To qualify, a candidate must be a Malaysian citizen at least 30 years old, residing in the Federation, must not owe allegiance to any foreign state, must not have received a prison sentence of one year or longer, and must not have been fined RM2,000 or more. Holders of a full-time profit-making position in the public service are also ineligible. There is no requirement to belong to a political party. Parliament is permitted to increase the number of senators to three per state, reduce the number of appointed senators, or abolish the post of appointed senator altogether. The process of appointment is set out by Article 45 of the Constitution. The Constitution provides for direct election of the 26 senators from the states, but this clause does not take effect until Parliament passes a law bringing it into effect. As of 2024, the power given to the Parliament under Clause (4) of Article 45 was never invoked and the senators remain indirectly elected.

Senators can be appointed to ministerial posts in the Cabinet by the King on the advice of the prime minister. However, the Dewan Negara never supplies the prime minister, as the prime minister must be a member of the Dewan Rakyat.

The Dewan Negara is not affected by the elections for the Dewan Rakyat, and senators continue to hold office despite the Dewan Rakyat's dissolution for an election.

The Dewan Negara elects a president to preside over sittings of the Dewan Negara, ensure observance of the rules of the house, and interpret the Standing Orders of the house should they be disputed. Should the president be absent, his deputy, the vice president, takes his place.

There are constitution provisions to increase state representation to 3 senators each, and for such senators to be directly elected. However, there has not been any political movement towards these.

== Powers and procedure ==
The Dewan Negara may initiate legislation, except for financial and fiscal matters – a regulation directly from the Westminster system. It may also amend legislation, provided it does not deal with financial matters. Any proposed legislation must first be passed by the Dewan Rakyat. Then it is presented to the Dewan Negara in three readings. At the first, the legislation's proposer presents it to the assembly. At the second, the bill is debated. At the third, a vote is taken whether to pass or reject the bill. The Dewan Negara may not formally reject bills; it is only allowed to delay their passage by one month, or up to a year under certain circumstances. After the bill has passed or the requisite period is up, the bill is presented to the King for royal assent. If the King objects or 30 days pass without royal assent, the bill is sent back to Parliament with a list of suggested amendments. The bill must then be reapproved by both houses of Parliament. If the King still does not grant royal assent 30 days after it is presented to him again, the bill automatically becomes law. It does not take effect, however, until it is published in the Government Gazette.

Although members of Parliament typically have legal immunity when it comes to freedom of discussion, a gag rule forbids discussion about certain articles of the Constitution such as the status of Bahasa Malaysia as the national language and Bumiputra privileges in Article 153.

== Current composition ==
As of June 2023, the Dewan Negara has 63 senators, most of them are appointed by the Yang di-Pertuan Agong.
