= Ali Biju =

Malaysian politician (born 1968)

Yang Berhormat Datuk Ali Biju PMW MP
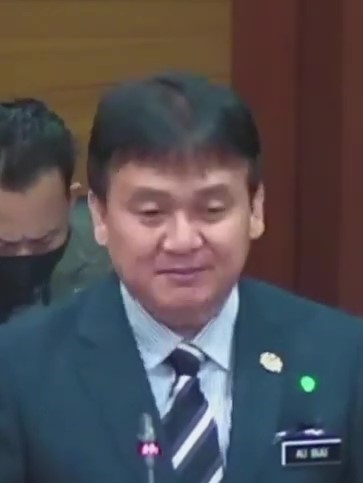
- Ali in 2020

Deputy Minister of Energy and Natural Resources
- In office 30 August 2021 – 24 November 2022
- Monarch: Abdullah
- Prime Minister: Ismail Sabri Yaakob
- Minister: Takiyuddin Hassan
- Preceded by: Himself
- Succeeded by: Huang Tiong Sii (Deputy Minister of Natural Resources, Environment and Climate Change)
- Constituency: Saratok
- In office 10 March 2020 – 16 August 2021
- Monarch: Abdullah
- Prime Minister: Muhyiddin Yassin
- Minister: Shamsul Anuar Nasarah
- Preceded by: Isnaraissah Munirah Majilis (Energy); Tengku Zulpuri Shah Raja Puji (Natural Resources)
- Succeeded by: Himself
- Constituency: Saratok

Member of the Malaysian Parliament for Saratok
- Incumbent
- Assumed office 9 May 2018
- Preceded by: William Mawan Ikom (BN−PBB)
- Majority: 989 (2018); 8,826 (2022)

Member of the Sarawak State Legislative Assembly for Krian
- In office 16 April 2011 – 18 December 2021
- Preceded by: Peter Nyarok Entrie (BN−SPDP)
- Succeeded by: Friday Belik (GPS−PDP)
- Majority: 2,090 (2011); 1,640 (2016)

Vice-President of the People's Justice Party
- In office 28 December 2018 – 24 February 2020 Serving with Zuraida Kamaruddin; Xavier Jayakumar Arulanandam; Chua Tian Chang; Rafizi Ramli; Chang Lih Kang
- President: Anwar Ibrahim
- Deputy: Mohamed Azmin Ali
- Preceded by: Shamsul Iskandar Md. Akin
- Succeeded by: Jugah Muyang

Personal details
- Born: Ali anak Biju; 27 January 1968 (age 58) Saratok, Betong Division, Sarawak, Malaysia
- Party: People's Justice Party (PKR) (until 2020); Malaysian United Indigenous Party (BERSATU) (since 2020)
- Other political affiliations: Pakatan Rakyat (PR) (2008-2015); Pakatan Harapan (PH) (2015-2020); Perikatan Nasional (PN) (2020-present)
- Education: Valparaiso University
- Occupation: Politician
- Profession: Civil engineer

Ali anak Biju (born 27 January 1968) is a Malaysian politician and civil engineer who has served as the Member of Parliament (MP) for Saratok since May 2018. He served as the Deputy Minister of Energy and Natural Resources for the second term in the Barisan Nasional (BN) administration under former Prime Minister Ismail Sabri Yaakob and former Minister Takiyuddin Hassan from August 2021 to the collapse of the BN administration in November 2022 and the first term in the Perikatan Nasional (PN) administration under former Prime Minister Muhyiddin Yassin and former Minister Shamsul Anuar Nasarah from March 2020 to the collapse of the PN administration in August 2021, Member of the Sarawak State Legislative Assembly (MLA) for Krian from April 2011 to December 2021. He is a member of the Malaysian United Indigenous Party (BERSATU), a component party of the PN coalition and was a member of the People's Justice Party (PKR), a component party of the Pakatan Harapan (PH) coalition. He also served as the Vice President of PKR from December 2018 to his resignation from the party in February 2020. He took part in the Sheraton Move, a successful attempt to overthrow PH administration and serves as a member of the Federal-State Relations Select Committee. He is the sole Sarawak PN MP and one of the only two non-Muslim (Christian) MPs and East Malaysian MPs of PN alongside Ronald Kiandee.

== Education ==
Ali completed his high school education in Datu Patinggi Abang Haji Abdillah College. In 1992, he graduated from the Valparaiso University with a Bachelor of Science in civil engineering.

== Personal life ==
Ali is currently active in the oil and gas industry as part of his civil engineering profession. He is also director of Kumus Sdn. Bhd.

== Election results ==
Parliament of Malaysia
Year	Constituency	Candidate	Votes	Pct	Opponent(s)	Votes	Pct	Ballots cast	Majority	Turnout
2013	P205 Saratok	Ali Biju (PKR)	9,519	43.67%	William Mawan Ikom (SPDP)	11,600	53.21%	22,136	2,081	80.31%
2013	P205 Saratok	Ali Biju (PKR)	9,519	43.67%	Roseli Paleng (IND)	681	3.12%	22,136	2,081	80.31%
2018	P205 Saratok	Ali Biju (PKR)	11,848	52.18%	Jagah @ Subeng Mula (PDP)	10,859	47.82%	23,084	989	75.64%
2022	P205 Saratok	Ali Biju (BERSATU)	19,223	62.33%	Giendam Jonathan Tait (PDP)	10,397	33.71%	30,841	8,826	75.64%
2022	P205 Saratok	Ali Biju (BERSATU)	19,223	62.33%	Ibil Jaya (PKR)	1,221	3.96%	30,841	8,826	75.64%

Sarawak State Legislative Assembly
Year	Constituency	Candidate	Votes	Pct	Opponent(s)	Votes	Pct	Ballots cast	Majority	Turnout
2011	N34 Krian	Ali Biju (PKR)	5,178	60.16%	Peter Nyarok Entrie (SPDP)	3,088	35.88%	8,688	2,090	78.87%
2011	N34 Krian	Ali Biju (PKR)	5,178	60.16%	Liman Sujang (SNAP)	216	2.51%	8,688	2,090	78.87%
2011	N34 Krian	Ali Biju (PKR)	5,178	60.16%	Banyi Beriak (IND)	125	1.45%	8,688	2,090	78.87%
2016	N34 Krian	Ali Biju (PKR)	5,388	58.98%	Kilat Beriak (SPDP)	3,748	41.02%	9,247	1,640	77.32%
2021	N34 Krian	Ali Biju (IND)	1,777	19.97%	Friday Belik (PDP)	3,885	43.67%	8,897	932	69.08%
2021	N34 Krian	Ali Biju (IND)	1,777	19.97%	Musa Dinggat (PSB)	2,953	33.19%	8,897	932	69.08%
2021	N34 Krian	Ali Biju (IND)	1,777	19.97%	Danny Kuan San Sui (PBK)	282	3.17%	8,897	932	69.08%

== Honours ==
=== Honours of Malaysia ===
- Malaysia
  - Recipient of the 17th Yang di-Pertuan Agong Installation Medal (2024)
- Federal Territory (Malaysia)
  - Commander of the Order of the Territorial Crown (PMW) – Datuk (2021)

== See also ==
- Saratok (federal constituency)
- Krian (state constituency)
