= Henry Harry Jinep =

Malaysian politician

Yang Berhormat Dato Henry Harry Jinep MLA PSBS

Deputy Minister for Transport
- Incumbent
- Assumed office 2022 Serving with Jerip Susil
- Governor: Abdul Taib Mahmud (2022-2024); Wan Junaidi Tuanku Jaafar (since 2024)
- Premier: Abang Johari
- Preceded by: Position established

Member of the Sarawak State Legislative Assembly for Tasik Biru
- Incumbent
- Assumed office 2016
- Preceded by: Peter Nansian Ngusie

Personal details
- Born: Harry anak Jinep; 21 October 1967 (age 58) Kampung Tanjong, Bau, Sarawak
- Citizenship: Malaysian
- Party: PDP
- Other political affiliations: Barisan Nasional (till 2018); Gabungan Parti Sarawak (since 2018)
- Spouse: Christina
- Education: Glasgow Caledonian University; Universiti Teknologi MARA
- Occupation: Politician

Henry @ Harry anak Jinep is a Malaysian politician from PDP. He has served as the Member of the Sarawak State Legislative Assembly for Tasik Biru since 2016. He is also the Deputy Minister for Transport and Deputy President of PDP.

== Election results ==
Sarawak State Legislative Assembly
Year	Constituency	Candidate	Votes	Pct.	Opponent(s)	Votes	Pct.	Ballots cast	Majority	Turnout
2016	N02 Tasik Biru	Henry Harry Jinep (PDP)	6,922	55.13%	Mordi Bimol (DAP)	5,634	44.87%	12,797	1,288	75.10%
2021	N02 Tasik Biru	Henry Harry Jinep (PDP)	6,325	53.71%	Paul Shanon Kenbel Barin (PBK)	2,113	17.94%	12,203	4,212	64.14%
2021	N02 Tasik Biru	Henry Harry Jinep (PDP)	6,325	53.71%	Tiki Lafe (PSB)	1,980	16.81%	12,203	4,212	64.14%
2021	N02 Tasik Biru	Henry Harry Jinep (PDP)	6,325	53.71%	Granda Aing (DAP)	1,359	11.54%	12,203	4,212	64.14%

== Honours ==
- Sarawak :
  - Commander of the Most Exalted Order of the Star of Sarawak (PSBS) – Dato (2015)
