= Sekatap =

- Location within Borneo
- Coordinates: 1.46667°N 111.56667°E
- Country: Malaysia
- State: Sarawak
- Administrative Division: Betong
- Elevation: 99 m (325 ft)

Sekatap (also known as Skatap) is a settlement in the Betong division of Sarawak, Malaysia. It lies approximately 137.8 kilometres (86 mi) east of the state capital Kuching.

Neighbouring settlements include:

- Ajau Nanga 1.9 kilometres (1.2 mi) north
- Rian Batang 1.9 kilometres (1.2 mi) south
- Melayu 1.9 kilometres (1.2 mi) south
- Meribong 2.6 kilometres (1.6 mi) northeast
- Jelau Nanga 2.6 kilometres (1.6 mi) northeast
- Lawing 2.6 kilometres (1.6 mi) southeast
