= Dunstan Endawie Enchana =

Malaysian politician

Yang Berbahagia Datuk Amar Dustan Endawie Anak Enchana DA PNBS

High Commissioner of Malaysia to New Zealand
- In office 16 July 1980 – 15 May 1982
- Monarch: Ahmad Shah
- Prime Minister: Mahathir Mohamad
- Preceded by: Mohamed Yusof Hitam
- Succeeded by: M. M. Sathiah

Deputy Chief Minister III of Sarawak
- In office 1977–1979
- Governor: Abang Muhammad Salahuddin
- Chief Minister: Abdul Rahman Ya'kub
- Preceded by: Office established
- Succeeded by: Daniel Tajem
- Constituency: Krian

Minister for Local Government (Sarawak)
- In office 1963–1966
- Governor: Abang Openg
- Chief Minister: Stephen Kalong Ningkan
- Constituency: Krian

2nd President of Sarawak National Party
- In office 1974 – June 1980
- Preceded by: Stephen Kalong Ningkan
- Succeeded by: James Wong Kim Min

Member of the Sarawak State Legislative Assembly for Krian
- In office 1963–1979
- Preceded by: Constituency established
- Succeeded by: Edmund Langgu Saga (PBDS-BN)
- Majority: 2,061 (1969); 1,727 (1974) ? (1979)

Personal details
- Born: Dunstan Endawie anak Enchana; 25 July 1937 Malupa, Krian, Saratok, Kingdom of Sarawak (now Sarawak, Malaysia)
- Died: 11 April 2014 (aged 76) Saratok Hospital, Saratok, Sarawak, Malaysia
- Resting place: Saratok Memorial Hills, Saratok, Sarawak, Malaysia
- Party: Sarawak National Party (SNAP)
- Other political affiliations: Barisan Nasional (BN)
- Spouse: Pelin Endawie
- Children: 1 daughter and 4 sons
- Occupation: Politician

Dunstan Endawie Anak Enchana (25 July 1937 – 11 April 2014) was a Malaysian politician from Sarawak, former teacher and a member of the Iban people. He served as the Deputy Chief Minister of Sarawak from 1977 until 1979. Endawie also served as a member of the Sarawak State Legislative Assembly for the Krian constituency and the President of the now defunct Sarawak National Party (SNAP) during his political career. He was also a member of the several Sarawak state cabinets, including a tenure as state minister for Local Government.

== Political career ==
Endawie began his career in Sarawak politics during the British colonial era. In 1963, he became a state cabinet minister under the first Chief Minister of Sarawak, Stephen Kalong Ningkan. Endawie became the President of the Sarawak National Party (SNAP) during the 1970s, a post he held until June 1980. Under Endawie leadership, SNAP became a member of the Barisan Nasional in 1976. Endawie also recruited several notable figures into SNAP, including Daniel Tajem, the former Vice-President of SNAP, whom Endawie persuaded to enter politics in 1968. Dunstan Endawie served as the Deputy Chief Minister of Sarawak from 1976 to 1979 under Chief Minister Abdul Rahman Ya'kub.

== Diplomatic career ==
Endawie entered into the diplomatic field after retiring from active state politics. He was appointed as the High Commissioner of Malaysia to New Zealand. Endawie was the first ethnic Iban to become a Malaysian High Commissioner to another country.

== Election results ==
Sarawak State Legislative Assembly
| Year | Constituency | Candidate | Votes | Pct | Opponent(s) | Votes | Pct | Ballots cast | Majority | Turnout |
|---|---|---|---|---|---|---|---|---|---|---|
| 1969 | Krian | Dunstan Endawie Enchana (SNAP) | 2,933 | 63.36% | Albans Meling Jan (PESAKA) | 872 | 18.84% | 5,033 | 2,061 | 79.79% |
| 1969 | Krian | Dunstan Endawie Enchana (SNAP) | 2,933 | 63.36% | Robinson Jelimin Telajan (SUPP) | 824 | 17.80% | 5,033 | 2,061 | 79.79% |
| 1974 | Krian | Dunstan Endawie Enchana (SNAP) | | | Luke Tungku (BN) | | | | 1,727 | |
| 1979 | Krian | Dunstan Endawie Enchana (SNAP) | | | (PAJAR) | 1,097 | | | | |

== Honours ==
- Sarawak
  - Knight Commander of the Order of the Star of Hornbill Sarawak (DA) – Datuk Amar
  - Knight Commander of the Order of the Star of Sarawak (PNBS) – formerly Dato', now Dato Sri (1965)

== Death ==
Dunstan Endawie died at approximately 4 a.m. at Saratok District Hospital on 11 April 2014, at the age of 76. Endawie, who was a resident of Letong Sawa, Saratok, was survived by his wife, Datin Amar Pelin Endawie, and five children. His funeral was held on 18 April 2014, in Taman Indah in Saratok. He was buried at Saratok Memorial Hill cemetery in Bukit Perabun, Saratok.

== See also ==
- Krian (state constituency)

Diplomatic posts
| Preceded by Mohamed Yusof Hitam | High Commissioner of Malaysia to New Zealand; 1980–1982 | Succeeded by M. M. Sathiah |
