= Belok =

- Location within Borneo
- Coordinates: 1.6°N 111.38333°E
- Country: Malaysia
- State: Sarawak
- Elevation: 119 m (390 ft)

Belok (also known as Rumah Nanggar) is a settlement in Sarawak, Malaysia. It lies approximately 116.8 kilometres (73 mi) east of the state capital Kuching.

Neighbouring settlements include:

- Balasau 1.9 kilometres (1.2 mi) east
- Isu 1.9 kilometres (1.2 mi) north
- Dit 2.6 kilometres (1.6 mi) southwest
- Rumah Luong 2.6 kilometres (1.6 mi) southeast
- Muton 4.1 kilometres (2.5 mi) northwest
- Loget 4.1 kilometres (2.5 mi) northeast
- Rapong 4.1 kilometres (2.5 mi) northeast
- Terai 4.1 kilometres (2.5 mi) southeast
