= Sarawak People's Energy Party =

Sarawak People's Energy Party Parti Tenaga Rakyat Sarawak
- Abbreviation: TERAS
- President: Banyi Beriak
- Secretary-General: Sudok Mesa
- Founder: William Mawan Ikom (2013 – 2016)
- Founded: June 2013
- Legalised: August 2013
- Headquarters: Kuching, Sarawak; Sri Aman, Sarawak
- Membership (2026): 5,800
- Ideology: Regionalism; Sarawak nationalism; National conservative; Self-determination; MA63 & law rights; Self-governance rights
- Political position: Centre to centre-right
- National affiliation: Barisan Nasional (allied party, 2013–2016)
- Regional affiliation: Parti Aspirasi Nasional (PAN) (since 2026)
- Colours: Blue; Red; Yellow; Green

The Sarawak People's Energy Party (Malay: Parti Tenaga Rakyat Sarawak, abbreviated TERAS) is a Sarawak-based centre-right political party in Malaysia. Founded by Tan Sri William Mawan Ikom (party president at that time) in 2013, it was among the 20 new parties to have its registration approved by the Registrar of Societies (RoS) in 2013.

== History ==
Back then, TERAS was a splinter political party of the Sarawak Progressive Democratic Party (SPDP). It was founded by disgruntled leaders led by William Mawan Ikom following a leadership crisis within the SPDP. The party was later joined by elected representatives from the Sarawak United People's Party (SUPP). The leadership of the party was supportive of the then ruling Barisan Nasional (BN) coalition. However, their application to become a BN component party was rejected by the coalition.

TERAS succeeded in attracting a total of 11 elected representatives to join the party in May 2014. However, Wong Soon Koh and four state assemblymen who defected to the party decided to quit TERAS to join the United People's Party (UPP), an offshoot of SUPP. An arrangement was made between TERAS and Barisan Nasional for the division of seats to be contested in the 2016 Sarawak state election. On 11 May 2016, the party's leadership decided to officially dissolve itself to allow their members, who were elected as direct BN candidates, to join any Sarawak-based component within the coalition. However, the plans were put on hold and then cancelled following the developments of the 2018 general election.

Banyi Beriak, who was the founding Secretary General of TERAS when it was formed in 2013 before quitting in 2018 to join the UPP and later the PSB, announced on 28 October 2021 that he had left PSB to return to TERAS to take over the presidency of the party. He then announced in December 2021 that the party would field candidates in the 2021 state election only to be canceled due to a lack of preparations by the party.

Some true speculations that TERAS will be fully prepraring for the upcoming 13th Sarawak general election in 2026.

== Government offices ==
=== State governments ===
- Sarawak (2014–2016)

Note: bold as Chief Minister, italic as junior partner

== List of TERAS presidents ==
- Tan Sri William Mawan Ikom (2013 – 2016)
- Banyi Beriak (2016 – now)

== Election results ==
=== State election results ===
Sarawak State Legislative Assembly
Election	Votes		Seats			Position (Note: As part of electoral coalition.)	Status
Election	Count	%	Result	Won / contested	+/–	Position	Status
2016	N/A (BN Direct)		3 / 82	3 / 3	▲3	1st (Barisan Nasional)	BN (2016)
2016	N/A (BN Direct)		3 / 82	3 / 3	▲3	1st (Barisan Nasional)	No seats (2016–2021)
2021	Did not contest						No seats

== See also ==
- Politics of Malaysia
- List of political parties in Malaysia
- Parti Aspirasi Nasional (PAN)
