= Ajau Nanga =

- Location within Borneo
- Coordinates: 1.48333°N 111.56667°E
- Country: Malaysia
- State: Sarawak
- Elevation: 96 m (315 ft)

Ajau Nanga is a settlement in Sarawak, Malaysia. It lies approximately 137.7 kilometres (86 mi) east of the state capital Kuching (181 km by road).

The primary school is called SK Nanga Ajau.

Neighbouring settlements include:

- Meribong 1.9 kilometres (1.2 mi) east
- Sekatap 1.9 kilometres (1.2 mi) south
- Dabok 1.9 kilometres (1.2 mi) south
- Temedak 2.6 kilometres (1.6 mi) northeast
- Jelau Ulu 3.7 kilometres (2.3 mi) east
