= Meribong =

- Location within Borneo
- Coordinates: 1.48333°N 111.58333°E
- Country: Malaysia
- State: Sarawak
- Elevation: 99 m (325 ft)

Meribong is a settlement in Sarawak, Malaysia. It lies approximately 139.5 kilometres (87 mi) east of the state capital Kuching.

Neighbouring settlements include:

- Ajau Nanga 1.9 kilometres (1.2 mi) west
- Jelau Ulu 1.9 kilometres (1.2 mi) east
- Temedak 1.9 kilometres (1.2 mi) north
- Lubau 1.9 kilometres (1.2 mi) north
- Gansurai 2.6 kilometres (1.6 mi) southwest
- Dabok 2.6 kilometres (1.6 mi) southwest
- Sekatap 2.6 kilometres (1.6 mi) southwest
