= Debak =

- Location within Borneo
- Coordinates: 1.56667°N 111.41667°E
- Country: Malaysia
- State: Sarawak
- Administrative division: Betong
- Elevation: 102 m (335 ft)

Debak is a small city in Malaysia, which prior to 2022 was a small district. This is because Debak is a rapidly developing urbanization area which is located on a very strategic route in the middle of a busy trade route, connecting directly to the Pan Borneo Highway. Not only that, the availability of petrol stations near the same route accelerates the process of urbanization and internal and external migration in Debak, which at the same time has increased the population in Debak District.

In addition, the area in the direction of Sarikei, Sarawak can also shorten the travel distance to Betong with the shortcut through the Debak District. This logistical reach has attracted many offers of socio-economic activities in Debak and the surrounding areas also benefit together.

Besides that, the socio-economic vibrancy in Debak is not only influenced by the road factor. The positive impact of income growth in the Debak District is also due to the existence of water connections, especially the Rimbas River that flows through the center of Debak and Di Tebingan. The waterfront acts as a catalytic element of Debak's economy. This is because, in addition to trade activities, and professional economic activities, Debak's progress is also driven by factors of conventional economic activities such as agriculture that involve some of the residents of Debak and the surrounding areas. Conventional agricultural activities previously labeled as the main pillar of income in Debak are now increasingly shifting to a much more modern agricultural paradigm. According to the times, almost 75% of the people in Debak District are now players in the professional sector such as in the Government sector, the Private sector and many in among them are big businessmen in major cities in Sarawak.

== History ==
It is not known when Debak was established. In the early 1980s, a fire razed the main bazaar. The present bazaar was built in 1989.

== Settlement ==
Debak District is one of several administrative districts in Sarawak. Debak district includes several settlements that consist of several villages in it as follows:

1. Kampung Lalang, Debak
2. Tuie Village, Debak
3. Debak Laut Village
4. Debak Town
5. Babu Village, Debak
6. Bungey Village, Debak
7. Long Houses in Ulu Rimbas
8. Muton Area
9. Kampung Dit
10. Dit Long Houses
11. Kampung Serembang, Debak
12. Bungin Village, Debak
13. Suri Area, Debak
14. Mayor Hamid's village, Debak
15. Kampung Suri, Debak
16. Rh. Snap Sabar Asal, Debak
17. Sengalang, Debak
