= Bagumbang =

- Location within Borneo
- Coordinates: 1.58333°N 111.63333°E
- Country: Malaysia
- State: Sarawak
- Elevation: 269 m (883 ft)

Bagumbang is a settlement in Sarawak, Malaysia. It lies approximately 144.6 kilometres (89.9 mi) east of the state capital Kuching. Neighboring settlements include:

- Sungai Tipus 1.9 kilometres (1.2 mi) east
- Langit 1.9 kilometres (1.2 mi) east
- Jaloh 2.6 kilometres (1.6 mi) southwest
- Meroh 6.7 kilometres (4.2 mi) northwest
- Sungai Kepayang 2.6 kilometres (1.6 mi) northeast
