= Betong District, Sarawak =

District in Betong Division, Sarawak, Malaysia

Betong District Daerah Betong
- District in Malaysia

Other transcription(s)
  - Chinese: 木中县 (Simplified) 木中縣 (Traditional); Mù zhōng xiàn (Hanyu Pinyin)
  - Tamil: பெத்தோங் மாவட்டம்

- Location within Sarawak Location within Malaysia
- Coordinates: 1°24′45″N 111°31′30″E
- Country: Malaysia
- State: Sarawak
- Seat: Betong
- Local area government(s): Betong District Council

Area
  - Total: 2,493.69 km^{2} (962.82 sq mi)

Population (2024)
  - Total: 113,781
  - Density: 45.6276/km^{2} (118.175/sq mi)
- Website: betongdo.sarawak.gov.my

Betong (Malay: Daerah Betong) is a district, in Betong Division, Sarawak, Malaysia. The town of Betong, which is the administrative centre of the larger Betong Division, is located in this district.

Betong District was formed in 2002, before which it was called Saribas District and was administratively a part of Sri Aman Division.

== Demographics ==
Ethnic composition of Betong District, Sarawak (2024)
Ethnicities / Nationality	Percentage
Malays	12.87%
Iban	67.04%
Bidayuh	0.08%
Melanau	0.45%
Other Bumiputeras	0.07%
Chinese	19.24%
Indians	0%
Others	0%
Non-Malaysian	0.25%

Ethnicity	2024	
Ethnicity	Pop.	%
Malays	14638	12.87%
Iban	76282	67.04%
Bidayuh	93	0.08%
Melanau	510	0.45%
Other Bumiputeras	76	0.07%
Chinese	21895	19.24%
Indians	0	0%
Others	0	0%
Malaysian total	113494	99.75%
Non-Malaysian	287	0.25%
Total	113781	100.00%

Historical population
Year	Pop.	±%
1990	29,783	—
1995	38,164	+28.1%
2004	50,791	+33.1%
2010	73,862	+45.4%
2015	99,835	+35.2%
2024	113,781	+14.0%

Total population of every areas in Betong, Sarawak. These population are exactly based on their ethnics in Sarawak.

Bandar Betong is the only town area with the majority of Iban community. Meanwhile Debak and Spaoh is predominantly Malay and Melanau.
