= Rolland Duat Jubin =

Malaysian politician

Yang Berhormat Rolland Duat Jubin MLA

Member of the Sarawak State Legislative Assembly for Meluan
- Incumbent
- Assumed office 2016
- Preceded by: Wong Judat

Personal details
- Born: Rolland Duat anak Jubin Sarawak
- Citizenship: Malaysian
- Party: PRS
- Other political affiliations: Barisan Nasional (till 2018); Gabungan Parti Sarawak (since 2018)
- Occupation: Politician

Rolland Duat anak Jubin is a Malaysian politician from PRS. He has served as the Member of the Sarawak State Legislative Assembly for Meluan since 2016.

== Election results ==
Sarawak State Legislative Assembly
Year	Constituency	Candidate	Votes	Pct.	Opponent(s)	Votes	Pct.	Ballots cast	Majority	Turnout
2016	N48 Meluan	Rolland Duat Jubin (PRS)	3,363	37.40%	Elly Lawai Ngalai (IND)	2,686	29.87%	9,140	677	69.76%
2016	N48 Meluan	Rolland Duat Jubin (PRS)	3,363	37.40%	Semana Sawang (PKR)	2,008	22.33%	9,140	677	69.76%
2016	N48 Meluan	Rolland Duat Jubin (PRS)	3,363	37.40%	Remiguis Noel @ Jerry Clement (IND)	934	10.39%	9,140	677	69.76%
2021	N48 Meluan	Rolland Duat Jubin (PRS)	5,269	53.21%	Elly Lawai Ngalai (PSB)	4,447	44.91%	10,034	822	68.39%
2021	N48 Meluan	Rolland Duat Jubin (PRS)	5,269	53.21%	Abdul Hamid Siong (PBK)	186	1.88%	10,034	822	68.39%
