= Friday Belik =

Malaysian politician

Yang Berhormat Dato Friday Belik PSBS PPC MLA

Member of the Sarawak State Legislative Assembly for Krian
- Incumbent
- Assumed office 2021
- Preceded by: Ali Biju

Personal details
- Born: Friday anak Belik Sarawak
- Citizenship: Malaysian
- Party: PDP
- Other political affiliations: Gabungan Parti Sarawak
- Occupation: Politician

Friday anak Belik is a Malaysian politician from PDP. He has served as the Member of the Sarawak State Legislative Assembly for Krian since 2021.

== Election results ==
Sarawak State Legislative Assembly
Year	Constituency	Candidate	Votes	Pct.	Opponent(s)	Votes	Pct.	Ballots cast	Majority	Turnout
2021	N39 Krian	Friday Belik (PDP)	3,885	43.67%	Musa Dinggat (PSB)	2,953	33.19%	9,032	932	69.08%
2021	N39 Krian	Friday Belik (PDP)	3,885	43.67%	Ali Biju (IND)	1,777	19.97%	9,032	932	69.08%
2021	N39 Krian	Friday Belik (PDP)	3,885	43.67%	Danny Kuan San Sui (PBK)	282	3.17%	9,032	932	69.08%

== Honours ==
- Sarawak
  - Commander of the Most Exalted Order of the Star of Sarawak (PSBS) – Dato (2026)
  - Recipient of the Distinguished Service Medal (PPC) (2019)
