= Saratok (federal constituency) =

Federal constituency of Sarawak, Malaysia

Saratok (P205)
Sarawak constituency

Federal constituency
- Legislature: Dewan Rakyat
- MP: Ali Biju; PN
- Constituency created: 1968
- First contested: 1969
- Last contested: 2022

Demographics
- Population (2020): 41,339
- Electors (2022): 44,531
- Area (km²): 1,666
- Pop. density (per km²): 24.8

Saratok is a federal constituency in Betong Division (Saratok District & Kabong District), Sarawak, Malaysia, that has been represented in the Dewan Rakyat since 1971.

The federal constituency was created in the 1968 redistribution and is mandated to return a single member to the Dewan Rakyat under the first past the post voting system.

== Demographics ==
https://ge15.orientaldaily.com.my/seats/sarawak/p

Ethnic breakdown of Saratok's electorate as of 2022
1. Sarawak bumiputera (54.4%)
2. Malay-Muslim bumiputera (38.7%)
3. Chinese (6.50%)
4. Other ethnicities (0.50%)

As of 2020, Saratok has a population of 41,339 people.

Age breakdown of Saratok's electorate as of 2022
1. 18-20 (6.64%)
2. 21-29 (20.7%)
3. 30-39 (20.8%)
4. 40-49 (15.9%)
5. 50-59 (16.6%)
6. 60-69 (11.9%)
7. 70-79 (5.56%)
8. 80-89 (1.43%)
9. above 90 (0.41%)
Gender breakdown of Saratok's electorate as of 2022
1. Male (49.9%)
2. Female (50.1%)

== History ==
=== Polling districts ===
According to the gazette issued on 31 October 2022, the Saratok constituency has a total of 19 polling districts.

State constituency	Polling Districts	Code	Location
Kalaka (N38)	Pelunga	205/38/01	SK Nyiar; RH Bundan Sg. Metong Roban; RH Siti Jubaidah Anak Lanchang Sg. Engkabang; SMK Kalaka Roban
Kalaka (N38)	Perpat	205/38/02	SK Lubok Nibong; SK Paloh; SK Perpat
Kalaka (N38)	Kaba	205/38/03	SK Haji Bollah Kaba; SK Kupang; SJK (C) Min Syn Saratok
Kalaka (N38)	Saratok	205/38/04	SK Abang Abdul Rahman Saratok
Kalaka (N38)	Tengalat	205/38/05	SK Entebu
Kalaka (N38)	Senyawan	205/38/06	SK Sg. Antu
Krian (N39)	Mudong	205/39/01	RH Jimbun Kop Ibus; SK Mudong; SK Supok; RH Mawat
Krian (N39)	Brayang	205/39/02	SK Brayang Riban; SK Lichok
Krian (N39)	Batu Anam	205/39/03	SK Ulu Sebetan; SK Central Batu Empat; SK Engkulu Saratok; SK Sg. Klampai
Krian (N39)	Diso	205/39/04	SK Temudok Awik; SK St. Peter Saratok; SK Malong
Krian (N39)	Awik	205/39/05	SK Ulu Awik; RH Tangan Ulu Risau; SK Ng. Atoi; RH Ring Tembawai Kapok; SK Lubok Kepayang; RH Ayom Ng. Luau
Krian (N39)	Melupa	205/39/06	Dewan Serbaguna St. Jerome Kaki Wong Saratok; RH Mawan Kawit Bunsi Saratok; SK Ng. Assam Saratok; SK Mendas Saratok
Krian (N39)	Kabo	205/39/07	SK Kabo Hilir Saratok; SK Wong Besi; SK Praha Kabo; RH Illau Krangan Rusa Ili; SK Babang; SK Lempa; SK Ulu Kabo
Krian (N39)	Gerenjang	205/39/08	SK Ulu Budu; RH Uding Ulu Budu Saratok; SK Ng. Budu; RH Jelai; RH Bunyih Tanjung Bangkit Saratok; RH Subing Ulu Krian; RH Ngitar Awas Krian; SK Ng Grenjang; RH Endit Ng Batang
Krian (N39)	Bajau	205/39/09	SK Ng. Abu; RH Ngalong Bajau Saratok
Krian (N39)	Krangan	205/39/10	SK Klua Saratok; SK Tandok Krangan Saratok
Kabong (N40)	Nyabor	205/40/01	SK Haji Junid Gerigat; SK Kpg. Alit Kabong; SK Engkabang Kabong; SK St. Michael Plassu; SK Sg. Pasir; SK To'Emam Nyabor; SK Empelam; SK Abang Moh Sesang
Kabong (N40)	Roban	205/40/02	SK Ulu Roban; SK St. Paul's Roban; SJK (C) Chung Hua Roban
Kabong (N40)	Kabong	205/40/03	SJK (C) Chung Hua Kabong; SK Abang Leman Kabong

=== Representation history ===
Members of Parliament for Saratok
Parliament	No	Years	Member	Party	Vote Share
Constituency created
		1969-1971	Parliament was suspended		
3rd	P131	1971-1974	Edmund Langgu Saga	SNAP	3,968; 42.09%
4th	P141	1974-1976	Edmund Langgu Saga	SNAP	5,258; 51.84%
4th	P141	1976-1978	Edmund Langgu Saga	BN (SNAP)	5,258; 51.84%
5th	P141	1978-1982	Edmund Langgu Saga	BN (SNAP)	7,260; 74.18%
6th	P141	1982-1986	Edmund Langgu Saga	Independent	6,517; 56.98%
7th	P164	1986-1990	Peter Tinggom Kamarau	BN (SNAP)	6,367; 50.27%
8th	P166	1990-1995	Peter Tinggom Kamarau	BN (SNAP)	9,551; 60.16%
9th	P178	1995-1999	Peter Tinggom Kamarau	BN (SNAP)	10,115; 64.69%
10th	P179	1999-2004	Peter Tinggom Kamarau	BN (SNAP)	10,545; 67.65%
11th	P205	2004-2008	Jelaing Mersat	BN (PDP)	11,995; 72.94%
12th	P205	2008-2013	Jelaing Mersat	BN (PDP)	12,470; 76.81%
13th	P205	2013	William Mawan Ikom	BN (PDP)	11,600; 53.21%
13th	P205	2013-2016	William Mawan Ikom	TERAS	11,600; 53.21%
13th	P205	2016-2018	William Mawan Ikom	BN (PBB)	11,600; 53.21%
14th	P205	2018-2020	Ali Biju	PH (PKR)	11,848; 52.18%
14th	P205	2020-2022	Ali Biju	PN (BERSATU)	11,848; 52.18%
15th	P205	2022–present	Ali Biju	PN (BERSATU)	19,223; 62.33%

=== State constituency ===
Parliamentary constituency	State constituency					
Parliamentary constituency	1969–1978	1978–1990	1990–1999	1999–2008	2008–2016	2016−present
Saratok						Kabong
Saratok	Kalaka					
Saratok	Krian					

=== Historical boundaries ===
State Constituency	Area					
State Constituency	1968	1977	1987	1996	2005	2015
Kabong						Gerigat; Kabong; Roban; Sesang; Ulu Sebetan
Kalaka	Engkabang; Gerigat; Kabong; Roban; Saratok		Gerigat; Kabong; Kampung Kupang; Roban; Saratok			Hilir Perpat; Lubok Nibong; Saratok; Sungai Entebu; Sungai Klampai
Krian	Kaki Wong; Kawit Bunsi; Krian; Mendas; Ulu Awik		Engkabang; Kawit Bunsi; Krian; Mendas; Ulu Awik			

=== Current state assembly members ===
No.	State Constituency	Member	Coalition (Party)
N38	Kalaka	Abdul Wahab Aziz	GPS (PBB)
N39	Krian	Friday Belik	GPS (PDP)
N40	Kabong	Mohd Chee Kadir	GPS (PBB)

=== Local governments & postcodes ===
No.	State Constituency	Local Government	Postcode
N38	Kalaka	Saratok District Council	94650 Kabong; 95300 Roban; 95400 Saratok
N39	Krian	Saratok District Council	94650 Kabong; 95300 Roban; 95400 Saratok
N40	Kabong	Saratok District Council	94650 Kabong; 95300 Roban; 95400 Saratok

== Election results ==
Malaysian general election, 2022
Party	Candidate	Votes	%	∆%
PN	Ali Biju	19,223	62.33	▲62.33
GPS	Giendam Jonathan Tait	10,397	33.71	▲33.71
PH	Ibil Jaya	1,221	3.96	▲3.96
Total valid votes		30,841	100.00	
Total rejected ballots		376		
Unreturned ballots		76		
Turnout		31,293	69.26	▼6.38
Registered electors		44,531		
Majority		8,826	28.62	▲24.26
PN gain from PH		Swing		?
Source(s) https://lom.agc.gov.my/ilims/upload/portal/akta/outputp/1753265/PARLIMEN%20SARAWAK%20(PUB%20620).pdf

Malaysian general election, 2018
Party	Candidate	Votes	%	∆%
PKR	Ali Biju	11,848	52.18	▲8.51
BN	Jagah @ Subeng Mula	10,859	47.82	▼5.39
Total valid votes		22,707	100.00	
Total rejected ballots		257		
Unreturned ballots		120		
Turnout		23,084	75.64	▼4.67
Registered electors		30,517		
Majority		989	4.36	▲5.18
PKR gain from BN		Swing		?
Source(s) "His Majesty's Government Gazette - Notice of Contested Election, Parliament for the State of Sarawak [P.U. (B) 247/2018]" (PDF). Attorney General's Chambers of Malaysia. 3 May 2018. "Federal Government Gazette - Results of Contested Election and Statements of the Poll after the Official Addition of Votes, Parliamentary Constituencies for the State of Sarawak [P.U. (B) 321/2018]" (PDF). Attorney General's Chambers of Malaysia. 28 May 2018. Archived from the original (PDF) on 2019-12-29.

Malaysian general election, 2013
Party	Candidate	Votes	%	∆%
BN	William Mawan Ikom	11,600	53.21	▼23.60
PKR	Ali Biju	9,519	43.67	▲20.48
Independent	Roseli Paleng	681	3.12	▲3.12
Total valid votes		21,800	100.00	
Total rejected ballots		258		
Unreturned ballots		78		
Turnout		22,136	80.31	▲11.65
Registered electors		27,562		
Majority		2,081	9.54	▼44.08
BN hold		Swing		
Source(s) "Federal Government Gazette - Notice of Contested Election, Parliament for the State of Sarawak [P.U. (B) 184/2013]" (PDF). Attorney General's Chambers of Malaysia. 26 April 2013. "Federal Government Gazette - Results of Contested Election and Statements of the Poll after the Official Addition of Votes, Parliamentary Constituencies for the State of Sarawak [P.U. (B) 225/2013]" (PDF). Attorney General's Chambers of Malaysia. 22 May 2013. Archived from the original (PDF) on 2018-09-30.

Malaysian general election, 2008
Party	Candidate	Votes	%	∆%
BN	Jelaing Mersat	12,470	76.81	▲3.87
PKR	Mohd Yahya Abdullah	3,764	23.19	▲23.19
Total valid votes		16,234	100.00	
Total rejected ballots		218		
Unreturned ballots		15		
Turnout		16,467	68.66	▲0.86
Registered electors		23,982		
Majority		8,706	53.62	▲7.74
BN hold		Swing		

Malaysian general election, 2004
Party	Candidate	Votes	%	∆%
BN	Jelaing Mersat	11,995	72.94	▲5.29
SNAP	Edmund Stanley Jugol Benedict Sandin	4,450	27.06	▲27.06
Total valid votes		16,445	100.00	
Total rejected ballots		229		
Unreturned ballots		10		
Turnout		16,684	67.80	▲0.64
Registered electors		24,607		
Majority		7,545	45.88	▲13.58
BN hold		Swing		

Malaysian general election, 1999
Party	Candidate	Votes	%	∆%
BN	Peter Tinggom Kamarau	10,545	67.65	▲2.96
PKR	Idris Bohari	5,042	32.35	▲32.35
Total valid votes		15,587	100.00	
Total rejected ballots		271		
Unreturned ballots				
Turnout		15,858	67.16	▼2.01
Registered electors		23,611		
Majority		5,503	32.30	▼10.25
BN hold		Swing		

Malaysian general election, 1995
Party	Candidate	Votes	%	∆%
BN	Peter Tinggom Kamarau	10,115	64.69	▲4.53
Independent	Lempeng @ Patrick Manka Laman	3,462	22.14	▲22.14
Independent	Wan Zainal Abidin Wan Senusi	1,381	8.83	▲8.83
PBS	Barudi @ Berendam Linggong	677	4.33	▲4.33
Total valid votes		15,635	100.00	
Total rejected ballots		265		
Unreturned ballots		70		
Turnout		15,970	69.17	▼6.80
Registered electors		23,089		
Majority		6,653	42.55	▲16.36
BN hold		Swing		

Malaysian general election, 1990
Party	Candidate	Votes	%	∆%
BN	Peter Tinggom Kamarau	9,551	60.16	▲9.89
Independent	Banyi Beriak	5,394	33.97	▲33.97
Independent	Barudi @ Berendam Linggong	639	4.02	▲4.02
Independent	Gerijih Tabor	293	1.85	▲1.85
Total valid votes		15,877	100.00	
Total rejected ballots		297		
Unreturned ballots		0		
Turnout		16,174	75.97	▲3.82
Registered electors		21,289		
Majority		4,157	26.19	▲20.44
BN hold		Swing		

Malaysian general election, 1986
Party	Candidate	Votes	%	∆%
BN	Peter Tinggom Kamarau	6,367	50.27	▲8.98
Independent	John Antau Linggang	5,639	44.52	▲44.52
Sarawak United Labour Party	Jahiri Jais	659	5.20	▲5.20
Total valid votes		12,665	100.00	
Total rejected ballots		174		
Unreturned ballots		0		
Turnout		12,839	72.15	▼1.04
Registered electors		17,795		
Majority		728	5.75	▼9.94
BN gain from Independent		Swing		?

Malaysian general election, 1982
Party	Candidate	Votes	%	∆%
Independent	Edmund Langgu Saga	6,517	56.98	▲56.98
BN	Dunstan Endawie	4,722	41.29	▼32.89
Independent	Mohamed Kho Abdullah	198	1.73	▲1.73
Total valid votes		11,437	100.00	
Total rejected ballots		222		
Unreturned ballots		0		
Turnout		11,659	73.19	▲3.04
Registered electors		15,929		
Majority		1,795	15.69	▼32.67
Independent gain from BN		Swing		?

Malaysian general election, 1978
Party	Candidate	Votes	%	∆%
BN	Edmund Langgu Saga	7,260	74.18	▲74.18
Parti Anak Jati Sarawak	Vincent Busut Dang	2,527	25.82	▲25.82
Total valid votes		9,787	100.00	
Total rejected ballots		420		
Unreturned ballots		0		
Turnout		10,207	70.15	▼10.90
Registered electors		14,550		
Majority		4,733	48.36	▲44.68
BN gain from SNAP		Swing		?

Malaysian general election, 1974
Party	Candidate	Votes	%	∆%
SNAP	Edmund Langgu Saga	5,258	51.84	▲9.75
BN	Douglas Sullang	4,885	48.16	▲48.16
Total valid votes		10,143	100.00	
Total rejected ballots		526		
Unreturned ballots		0		
Turnout		10,669	81.05	▼2.29
Registered electors		13,163		
Majority		373	3.68	▼11.51
SNAP hold		Swing		

Malaysian general election, 1969
Party	Candidate	Votes	%
SNAP	Edmund Langgu Saga	3,968	42.09
PESAKA	Anthony Nibong Linggang	2,536	26.90
PBB	M. Su'ut Tahir	1,792	19.01
SUPP	Bauk Buma	1,132	12.01
Total valid votes		9,428	100.00
Total rejected ballots		483	
Unreturned ballots		0	
Turnout		9,911	83.34
Registered electors		11,892	
Majority		1,432	15.19
This was a new constituency created.
