= Tasik Biru =

State constituency in Sarawak, Malaysia

Sarawak constituency

State constituency
- Legislature: Sarawak State Legislative Assembly
MLA
Vacant
- Constituency created: 1977
- First contested: 1979
- Last contested: 2026

Tasik Biru is a state constituency in Sarawak, Malaysia, that has been represented in the Sarawak State Legislative Assembly since 1979.

The state constituency was created in the 1977 redistribution and is mandated to return a single member to the Sarawak State Legislative Assembly under the first past the post voting system.

== Demographics ==
Ethnic breakdown of Tasik Biru's electorate as of 2022
1. Sarawak bumiputera (69.2%)
2. Chinese (23.8%)
3. Malay-Muslim bumiputera (6.70%)
4. Other ethnicities (0.90%)

== History ==
As of 2020, Tasik Biru has a population of 29,670 people.

=== Polling districts ===
According to the gazette issued on 31 October 2022, the Tasik Biru constituency has a total of 26 polling districts.

State constituency	Polling Districts	Code	Location
Tasik Biru (N02)	Sajong	192/02/01	SK Bobak / Sejinjang
Tasik Biru (N02)	Apar	192/02/02	SK Apar
Tasik Biru (N02)	Buso	192/02/03	SJK (C) Chung Hua Buso
Tasik Biru (N02)	Tondong	192/02/04	SJK (C) Chung Hua Tondong
Tasik Biru (N02)	Grogo	192/02/05	Balai Raya Kpg. Grogo
Tasik Biru (N02)	Bau	192/02/06	SJK (C) Chung Hua Bau
Tasik Biru (N02)	Skiat	192/02/07	Balai Raya Kpg. Skiat Baru; SK Bau Taman Mutiara
Tasik Biru (N02)	Jagoi	192/02/08	Balai Raya Kpg. Duyoh
Tasik Biru (N02)	Daun	192/02/09	Balai Raya Kpg. Daun
Tasik Biru (N02)	Tanjong Poting	192/02/10	Balai Raya Kpg. Tanjong Poting
Tasik Biru (N02)	Atas	192/02/11	SK Atas
Tasik Biru (N02)	Barieng	192/02/12	Balai Raya Kpg. Barieng
Tasik Biru (N02)	Sudoh	192/02/13	Dewan Rekreasi Singgai Kpg. Sudoh
Tasik Biru (N02)	Segong	192/02/14	Balai Raya Kpg. Segong
Tasik Biru (N02)	Musi	192/02/15	SJK (C) Chung Hua Musi
Tasik Biru (N02)	Suba Buan	192/02/16	SK Suba Buan
Tasik Biru (N02)	Subar Bau	192/02/17	Dewan Serbaguna Kpg. Suba Bau
Tasik Biru (N02)	Sibuloh	192/02/18	Balai Raya Kpg. Sibuloh
Tasik Biru (N02)	Sebuku	192/02/19	SJK (C) Chung Hua Sebuku
Tasik Biru (N02)	Tai Ton	192/02/20	SJK (C) Chung Hua Tai Ton
Tasik Biru (N02)	Stass	192/02/21	SK Stass
Tasik Biru (N02)	Skibang	192/02/22	Balai Raya Kpg. Skibang
Tasik Biru (N02)	Sibobog	192/02/23	SK Sebobok
Tasik Biru (N02)	Serasot	192/02/24	SK Serasot
Tasik Biru (N02)	Serikin	192/02/25	SK Serabak
Tasik Biru (N02)	Bogag	192/02/26	Balai Raya Kpg. Bogag

=== Representation history ===
Members of the Legislative Assembly for Tasik Biru
Assembly	No	Years	Member	Party
Constituency created from Bau
10th	N02	1979-1983	Patrick Uren	Independent
11th	N02	1983-1987	Patau Rubis	SNAP
12th	N02	1987-1991	Patau Rubis	BN (SNAP)
13th	N02	1991-1996	Patau Rubis	BN (SNAP)
14th	N02	1996-2001	Peter Nansian Ngusie	BN (SNAP)
15th	N02	2001-2004	Peter Nansian Ngusie	BN (SNAP)
15th	N02	2004-2006	Peter Nansian Ngusie	BN (PDP)
16th	N02	2006-2011	Peter Nansian Ngusie	BN (PDP)
17th	N02	2011-2014	Peter Nansian Ngusie	BN (PDP)
17th	N02	2014-2016	Peter Nansian Ngusie	TERAS
18th	N02	2016–2018	Henry Harry Jinep	BN (PDP)
18th	N02	2018-2021	Henry Harry Jinep	GPS (PDP)
19th	N02	2021–2026	Henry Harry Jinep	GPS (PDP)

== Election results ==
Sarawak state election, 2026: Tasik Biru
Party	Candidate	Votes	%	∆%
PBDS Baru	Daniel Jani			▲
GPS				▲
PH				▲
Total valid votes				
Total rejected ballots				
Unreturned ballots				
Turnout				
Registered electors				
Majority				

Sarawak state election, 2021: Tasik Biru
Party	Candidate	Votes	%	∆%
GPS	Henry Harry Jinep	6,325	53.71	▲53.71
PBK	Paul Shanon Kenbel Barin	2,113	17.94	▲17.94
PSB	Tiki Lafe	1,980	16.81	▲16.81
DAP	Granda Aing	1,359	11.54	▼33.33
Total valid votes		11,777	100.00	
Total rejected ballots		194		
Unreturned ballots		32		
Turnout		12,203	65.20	▼9.90
Registered electors		18,715		
Majority		4,212	35.77	▲25.51
GPS gain from BN		Swing		?
Source(s) (https://lom.agc.gov.my/ilims/upload/portal/akta/outputp/1718688/PUB687.pdf)

Sarawak state election, 2016: Tasik Biru
Party	Candidate	Votes	%	∆%
BN	Henry Harry Jinep	6,922	55.13	▼0.86
DAP	Mordi Bimol	5,634	44.87	▲44.87
Total valid votes		12,556	100.00	
Total rejected ballots		197		
Unreturned ballots		44		
Turnout		12,797	75.10	▲5.19
Registered electors		17,041		
Majority		1,288	10.26	▼9.64
BN hold		Swing		
Source(s) [(https://web.archive.org/web/20170612232706/http://www.federalgazette.agc.gov.my/outputp/pub_20160425_P.U.%20(B)%20190%20-%20%20BORANG%208%20PRU%20DUN%20Sarawak%20%20ke%20-%2011%20%20(25.4.2016).pdf) "Federal Government Gazette - Notice of Contested Election, State Legislative Assembly of the State of Sarawak [P.U. (B) 190/2016]"]. Attorney General's Chambers of Malaysia. 25 April 2016. Archived from [(http://www.federalgazette.agc.gov.my/outputp/pub_20160425_P.U.%20(B)%20190%20-%20%20BORANG%208%20PRU%20DUN%20Sarawak%20%20ke%20-%2011%20%20(25.4.2016).pdf) the original] on 2017-06-12.; [(https://web.archive.org/web/20160425113838/http://resultpru11sarawak.spr.gov.my/module/penamaan/laporan/laporan_6/laporan_6.php) "Senarai Calon yang Disahkan Layak Bertanding Pilihan Raya Dewan Undangan Negeri ke-11"]. Election Commission of Malaysia. 25 April 2016. Archived from [(http://resultpru11sarawak.spr.gov.my/module/penamaan/laporan/laporan_6/laporan_6.php) the original] on 25 April 2016.;

Sarawak state election, 2011: Tasik Biru
Party	Candidate	Votes	%	∆%
BN	Peter Nansian Ngusie	5,829	55.99	▼10.72
PKR	John Tenewi Nuek @ John Tenewi	3,757	36.09	▲36.09
SNAP	Frankie Jurem Nyombui	825	7.92	▼25.37
Total valid votes		10,411	100.00	
Total rejected ballots		120		
Unreturned ballots		26		
Turnout		10,557	69.91	▲4.76
Registered electors		15,100		
Majority		2,072	19.90	▼13.52
BN hold		Swing		
Source(s) [(http://www.federalgazette.agc.gov.my/outputp/pub_20110429_245-DRAF%20KEPUTUSAN%20PILIHAN%20RAYA-SARAWAK.pdf) "Federal Government Gazette - Results of Contested Election and Statements of the Poll after the Official Addition of Votes Sarawak [P.U. (B) 245/2011]"]. Attorney General's Chambers of Malaysia. 29 April 2011.

Sarawak state election, 2006: Tasik Biru
Party	Candidate	Votes	%	∆%
BN	Peter Nansian Ngusie	6,393	66.71	▲5.02
SNAP	Joseph Jutem Umen	3,190	33.29	▲33.29
Total valid votes		9,583	100.00	
Total rejected ballots		147		
Unreturned ballots		32		
Turnout		9,762	65.15	▼5.40
Registered electors		14,983		
Majority		3,203	33.42	▲10.04
BN hold		Swing		

Sarawak state election, 2001: Tasik Biru
Party	Candidate	Votes	%	∆%
BN	Peter Nansian Ngusie	7,238	61.69	▲4.21
STAR	Joseph Jindy Peter Rosen	4,494	38.31	▲38.31
Total valid votes		11,732	100.00	
Total rejected ballots		213		
Unreturned ballots		30		
Turnout		11,975	70.55	▼0.28
Registered electors		16,974		
Majority		2,744	23.38	▲8.42
BN hold		Swing		

Sarawak state election, 1996: Tasik Biru
Party	Candidate	Votes	%	∆%
BN	Peter Nansian Ngusie	6,049	57.48	▼5.92
Independent	Patau Rubis	4,474	42.52	▲42.52
Total valid votes		10,523	100.00	
Total rejected ballots		137		
Unreturned ballots		68		
Turnout		10,728	70.83	▼3.74
Registered electors		15,147		
Majority		1,575	14.96	▼19.09
BN hold		Swing		

Sarawak state election, 1991: Tasik Biru
Party	Candidate	Votes	%	∆%
BN	Patau Rubis	7,759	63.40	▲11.76
PBDS	Patrick Uren	3,592	29.35	▼19.01
Independent	Abdul Karim Ayub	673	5.50	▲5.50
NEGARA	Aloysius Dom Nagok	215	1.75	▲1.75
Total valid votes		12,239	100.00	
Total rejected ballots		153		
Unreturned ballots		242		
Turnout		12,634	74.57	▼0.27
Registered electors		16,943		
Majority		4,167	34.05	▲30.77
BN hold		Swing		

Sarawak state election, 1987: Tasik Biru
Party	Candidate	Votes	%	∆%
BN	Patau Rubis	6,569	51.64	▼9.43
PBDS	Wilfred Rata Nissom	6,152	48.36	▲48.36
Total valid votes		12,721	100.00	
Total rejected ballots		167		
Unreturned ballots		0		
Turnout		12,888	74.84	▼1.69
Registered electors		17,220		
Majority		417	3.28	▼19.85
BN gain from SNAP		Swing		?

Sarawak state election, 1983: Tasik Biru
Party	Candidate	Votes	%	∆%
SNAP	Patau Rubis	7,064	61.07	▲61.07
BN	Peter Minos	4,389	37.94	▲22.55
Independent	Aloysius Dom Nagok	114	0.99	▼4.52
Total valid votes		11,567	100.00	
Total rejected ballots		136		
Unreturned ballots		0		
Turnout		11,703	76.53	▼0.27
Registered electors		15,292		
Majority		2,675	23.13	▼1.73
SNAP gain from Independent		Swing		?

Sarawak state election, 1979: Tasik Biru
Party	Candidate	Votes	%
Independent	Patrick Uren	5,127	51.98
Independent	Ku Fut Nam	2,675	27.12
BN	Lee Nyan Choi	1,518	15.39
Independent	Aloysius Dom Nagok	543	5.51
Total valid votes		9,863	100.00
Total rejected ballots		184	
Unreturned ballots		0	
Turnout		10,047	76.80
Registered electors		12,838	
Majority		2,452	24.86
This was a new constituency created.
