= Meluan (state constituency) =

State constituency in Sarawak, Malaysia

Meluan (N48)
Sarawak constituency

State constituency
- Legislature: Sarawak State Legislative Assembly
MLA
Vacant
- Constituency created: 1968
- First contested: 1969
- Last contested: 2026

Meluan is a state constituency in Sarawak, Malaysia, that has been represented in the Sarawak State Legislative Assembly since 1969.

The state constituency was created in the 1968 redistribution and is mandated to return a single member to the Sarawak State Legislative Assembly under the first past the post voting system.

== Demographics ==
Ethnic breakdown of Meluan's electorate as of 2022
1. Sarawak bumiputera (94.8%)
2. Malay-Muslim bumiputera (0.80%)
3. Chinese (3.70%)
4. Other ethnicities (0.70%)

== History ==
As of 2020, Meluan has a population of 17,951 people.

=== Polling districts ===
According to the gazette issued on 31 October 2022, the Meluan constituency has a total of 7 polling districts.

State constituency	Polling Districts	Code	Location
Meluan (N48)	Balut	209/48/01	SK Ng. Lasi; SK Ng. Serau
Meluan (N48)	Julau	209/48/02	RH Kapol Ng. Bua; SJK (C) Yuk Kung
Meluan (N48)	Rayah	209/48/03	Balai Raya RH Lidoh; SK St Alphonsus
Meluan (N48)	Meluan	209/48/04	SK Ng. Kelangas; SK Sg. Merurun; RH Genta Ng Bilat/Lijan; SK Ng. Meluan
Meluan (N48)	Engkamup	209/48/05	SK Ng. Sengaih; SK Ng. Engkamop
Meluan (N48)	Entabai	209/48/06	SK Ng. Entaih; SK Ulu Entabai; SK Ulu Entaih Entabai
Meluan (N48)	Beketan	209/48/07	SK Ng. Jambu; SK Ng. Ensiring; SK Tapang Punggu; SK Ng. Ju Ulu Mujok; SK Ng. Maong; SK Lubok Assam; SK Ng. Entabai

=== Representation history ===
Members of the Legislative Assembly for Meluan
Assembly	No	Years	Member	Party
Constituency created
8th	N34	1970-1974	Gramong Jelian	SNAP
9th	N34	1974-1979	Gramong Jelian	SNAP
10th	N34	1979-1983	Gramong Jelian	BN (SNAP)
11th	N34	1983-1987	Geman Itam	SNAP
12th	N34	1987-1991	Geman Itam	PBDS
13th	N34	1991-1996	Geman Itam	BN (PBDS)
14th	N36	1996-2001	Geman Itam	BN (PBDS)
15th	N36	2001-2006	Wong Judat	Independent
16th	N42	2006-2011	Wong Judat	BN (PRS)
17th	N42	2011-2012	Wong Judat	BN (PRS)
17th	N42	2012-2016	Wong Judat	SWP
18th	N48	2016-2018	Rolland Duat Jubin	BN (PRS)
18th	N48	2018-2021	Rolland Duat Jubin	GPS (PRS)
19th	N48	2021–2026	Rolland Duat Jubin	GPS (PRS)

== Election results ==
Sarawak state election, 2026
Party	Candidate	Votes	%	∆%
GPS				▲
PH				▲
Total valid votes				
Total rejected ballots				
Unreturned ballots				
Turnout				
Registered electors				
Majority				

Sarawak state election, 2021
Party	Candidate	Votes	%	∆%
GPS	Rolland Duat Jubin	5,269	53.21	▲53.21
PSB	Elly Lawai Ngalai	4,447	44.91	▲15.04
PBK	Abdul Hamid Siong	186	1.88	▲1.88
Total valid votes		9,902	100.00	
Total rejected ballots		102		
Unreturned ballots		30		
Turnout		10,034	68.39	▼1.37
Registered electors		14,671		
Majority		822	8.30	▲0.77
GPS gain from BN		Swing		?
Source(s) https://lom.agc.gov.my/ilims/upload/portal/akta/outputp/1718688/PUB687.pdf

Sarawak state election, 2016
Party	Candidate	Votes	%	∆%
BN	Rolland Duat Jubin	3,363	37.40	▼21.02
Independent	Elly Lawai Ngalai	2,686	29.87	▲29.87
PKR	Semana Sawang	2,008	22.33	▼15.30
Independent	Remiguis Noel @ Jerry Clement	934	10.39	▲10.39
Total valid votes		8,991	100.00	
Total rejected ballots		127		
Unreturned ballots		22		
Turnout		9,140	69.76	▼0.24
Registered electors		13,103		
Majority		677	7.53	▼13.25
BN hold		Swing		
Source(s) "Federal Government Gazette - Notice of Contested Election, State Legislative Assembly of the State of Sarawak [P.U. (B) 190/2016]" (PDF). Attorney General's Chambers of Malaysia. 25 April 2016. Archived from the original (PDF) on 12 June 2017. "Senarai Calon yang Disahkan Layak Bertanding Pilihan Raya Dewan Undangan Negeri ke-11". Election Commission of Malaysia. 25 April 2016. Archived from the original on 25 April 2016.

Sarawak state election, 2011
Party	Candidate	Votes	%	∆%
BN	Wong Judat	4,615	58.42	▼8.46
PKR	John Brian Anthony Jeremy Guang	2,973	37.63	▲37.63
SNAP	Ambrose Labang Jamba	312	3.95	▼1.84
Total valid votes		7,900	100.00	
Total rejected ballots		119		
Unreturned ballots		22		
Turnout		8,041	70.00	▲1.06
Registered electors		11,487		
Majority		1,642	20.78	▼18.75
BN hold		Swing		
Source(s) "Federal Government Gazette - Results of Contested Election and Statements of the Poll after the Official Addition of Votes Sarawak [P.U. (B) 245/2011]" (PDF). Attorney General's Chambers of Malaysia. 29 April 2011.

Sarawak state election, 2006
Party	Candidate	Votes	%	∆%
BN	Wong Judat	5,086	66.88	▲2.15
Independent	Jenggie Malaka	2,079	27.34	▲27.34
SNAP	Ambrose Labang Jamba	440	5.79	▲5.79
Total valid votes		7,605	100.00	
Total rejected ballots		91		
Unreturned ballots		4		
Turnout		7,700	68.94	▼5.86
Registered electors		11,169		
Majority		3,007	39.54	▲10.08
BN gain from Independent		Swing		?

Sarawak state election, 2001
Party	Candidate	Votes	%	∆%
Independent	Wong Judat	4,742	64.73	▲64.73
BN	Geman Itam	2,584	35.27	▼7.18
Total valid votes		7,326	100.00	
Total rejected ballots		109		
Unreturned ballots		2		
Turnout		7,437	74.80	▲1.65
Registered electors		9,943		
Majority		2,158	29.46	▲27.52
Independent gain from BN		Swing		?

Sarawak state election, 1996
Party	Candidate	Votes	%	∆%
BN	Geman Itam	2,869	42.45	▼7.57
Independent	Thomas Salang Siden	2,738	40.51	▲40.51
Independent	Jeffrey Geraman Nyambang	979	14.49	▲14.49
Independent	David Gramong	172	2.55	▲2.55
Total valid votes		6,758	100.00	
Total rejected ballots		139		
Unreturned ballots		20		
Turnout		6,917	73.15	▼5.12
Registered electors		9,456		
Majority		131	1.94	▼15.07
BN hold		Swing		

Sarawak state election, 1991
Party	Candidate	Votes	%	∆%
BN	Giman anak Itam	3,144	56.50	▼3.49
PBDS	Edward Empra anak Kadom	2,197	39.48	▼20.51
NEGARA	David anak Gramong	224	4.03	▲4.03
Total valid votes		5,565	100.00	
Total rejected ballots		146		
Unreturned ballots		724		
Turnout		6,435	78.27	
Registered electors		8,222		
Majority		947	17.02	▼2.96
BN gain from PBDS		Swing		?

Sarawak state election, 1987
Party	Candidate	Votes	%	∆%
PBDS	Giman anak Itam	3,135	59.99	▲12.30
BN	Langgu Panyang	2,091	40.01	▼7.42
Total valid votes		5,226	100.00	
Total rejected ballots		61		
Unreturned ballots		0		
Turnout		5,287	81.55	
Registered electors		6,483		
Majority		1,044	19.98	▲19.71
PBDS gain from SNAP		Swing		?

Sarawak state election, 1983
Party	Candidate	Votes	%	∆%
SNAP	Giman anak Itam	1,977	47.70	▼19.39
PBDS	Ambrose Gramong anak Jelian	1,966	47.43	▲47.43
Independent	Brayan anak Jalang	105	2.53	▲2.53
Independent	Entinggi anak Manggoi	97	2.34	▲2.34
Total valid votes		4,145	100.00	
Total rejected ballots		94		
Unreturned ballots		0		
Turnout		4,239	73.06	
Registered electors		5,802		
Majority		11	0.27	▼33.89
SNAP gain from BN		Swing		?

Sarawak state election, 1979
Party	Candidate	Votes	%	∆%
On the nomination day, Gramong anak Jelian won uncontested.
BN	Gramong anak Jelian			
Total valid votes			100.00	
Total rejected ballots				
Unreturned ballots				
Turnout				
Registered electors		5,232		
Majority				
BN gain from SNAP		Swing		?

Sarawak state election, 1974
Party	Candidate	Votes	%	∆%
SNAP	Gramong anak Jelian	1,891	67.08	▲28.90
BN	Janggu anak Banyang	928	32.92	▲32.92
Total valid votes		2,819	100.00	
Total rejected ballots		349		
Unreturned ballots		0		
Turnout		3,168	66.77	▼3.22
Registered electors		4,745		
Majority		963	34.16	▲31.12
SNAP hold		Swing		

Sarawak state election, 1969
Party	Candidate	Votes	%
SNAP	Gramong Jelian	880	38.18
PESAKA	Philip Nyadang Janting	810	35.14
Independent	Empaling	381	16.53
Independent	Tedong Entalai	234	10.15
Total valid votes		2,305	100.00
Total rejected ballots		347	
Unreturned ballots		0	
Turnout		2,652	69.99
Registered electors		3,789	
Majority		70	3.04
This was a new constituency created.
