= Krian =

State constituency in Sarawak, Malaysia

Krian (N39)
Sarawak constituency

State constituency
- Legislature: Sarawak State Legislative Assembly
MLA
Vacant
- Constituency created: 1968
- First contested: 1969
- Last contested: 2026

Krian is a state constituency in Sarawak, Malaysia, that has been represented in the Sarawak State Legislative Assembly since 1969.

The state constituency was created in the 1968 redistribution and is mandated to return a single member to the Sarawak State Legislative Assembly under the first past the post voting system.

== Demographics ==
Ethnic breakdown of Krian's electorate as of 2022
1. Sarawak bumiputera (93.4%)
2. Chinese (4.30%)
3. Malay-Muslim bumiputera (2.00%)
4. Other ethnicities (0.30%)

== History ==
As of 2020, Krian has a population of 15,484 people.

=== Polling districts ===
According to the gazette issued on 31 October 2022, the Krian constituency has a total of 10 polling districts.

State constituency	Polling Districts	Code	Location
Krian (N39)	Mudong	205/39/01	RH Jimbun Kop Ibus; SK Mudong; SK Supok; RH Mawat
Krian (N39)	Brayang	205/39/02	SK Brayang Riban; SK Lichok
Krian (N39)	Batu Anam	205/39/03	SK Ulu Sebetan; SK Central Batu Empat; SK Engkulu Saratok; SK Sg. Klampai
Krian (N39)	Diso	205/39/04	SK Temudok Awik; SK St. Peter Saratok; SK Malong
Krian (N39)	Awik	205/39/05	SK Ulu Awik; RH Tangan Ulu Risau; SK Ng. Atoi; RH Ring Tembawai Kapok; SK Lubok Kepayang; RH Ayom Ng. Luau
Krian (N39)	Melupa	205/39/06	Dewan Serbaguna St. Jerome Kaki Wong Saratok; RH Mawan Kawit Bunsi Saratok; SK Ng. Assam Saratok; SK Mendas Saratok
Krian (N39)	Kabo	205/39/07	SK Kabo Hilir Saratok; SK Wong Besi; SK Praha Kabo; RH Illau Krangan Rusa Ili; SK Babang; SK Lempa; SK Ulu Kabo
Krian (N39)	Gerenjang	205/39/08	SK Ulu Budu; RH Uding Ulu Budu Saratok; SK Ng. Budu; RH Jelai; RH Bunyih Tanjung Bangkit Saratok; RH Subing Ulu Krian; RH Ngitar Awas Krian; SK Ng Grenjang; RH Endit Ng Batang
Krian (N39)	Bajau	205/39/09	SK Ng. Abu; RH Ngalong Bajau Saratok
Krian (N39)	Krangan	205/39/10	SK Klua Saratok; SK Tandok Krangan Saratok

=== Representation history ===
Members of the Legislative Assembly for Krian
Assembly	No	Years	Member	Party
Constituency created
8th	N22	1970-1974	Dunstan Endawie Enchana	SNAP
9th	N22	1974-1979	Dunstan Endawie Enchana	SNAP
10th	N22	1979-1983	Dunstan Endawie Enchana	BN (SNAP)
11th	N22	1983-1987	Edmund Langgu Saga	PBDS
12th	N22	1987-1991	Edmund Langgu Saga	PBDS
13th	N27	1991-1996	Peter Nyarok Entrie	BN (PBDS)
14th	N29	1996-2001	Peter Nyarok Entrie	BN (PBDS)
15th	N29	2001-2004	Peter Nyarok Entrie	BN (PBDS)
15th	N29	2004-2008	Peter Nyarok Entrie	BN (PDP)
16th	N34	2006-2011	Peter Nyarok Entrie	BN (PDP)
17th	N34	2011-2016	Ali Biju	PR (PKR)
18th	N39	2016-2020	Ali Biju	PH (PKR)
18th	N39	2020-2021	Ali Biju	PN (BERSATU)
19th	N39	2021–2026	Friday Belik	GPS (PDP)

== Election results ==
Sarawak state election, 2026: Krian
Party	Candidate	Votes	%	∆%
GPS				▲
PH				▲
Total valid votes				
Total rejected ballots				
Unreturned ballots				
Turnout				
Registered electors				
Majority				

Sarawak state election, 2021: Krian
Party	Candidate	Votes	%	∆%
GPS	Friday Belik	3,885	43.67	▲43.67
PSB	Musa Dinggat	2,953	33.19	▲33.19
Independent	Ali Biju	1,777	19.97	▼39.01
PBK	Danny Kuan San Sui	282	3.17	▲3.17
Total valid votes		8,897	100.00	
Total rejected ballots		106		
Unreturned ballots		29		
Turnout		9,032	69.08	▼8.24
Registered electors		13,074		
Majority		932	10.48	▼7.47
GPS gain from PKR		Swing		?
Source(s) https://lom.agc.gov.my/ilims/upload/portal/akta/outputp/1718688/PUB687.pdf

Sarawak state election, 2016: Krian
Party	Candidate	Votes	%	∆%
PKR	Ali Biju	5,388	58.98	▼1.18
BN	Kilat Beriak	3,748	41.02	▲5.14
Total valid votes		9,136	100.00	
Total rejected ballots		58		
Unreturned ballots		53		
Turnout		9,247	77.32	▼1.55
Registered electors		11,959		
Majority		1,640	17.95	▼6.33
PKR hold		Swing		
Source(s) "Federal Government Gazette - Notice of Contested Election, State Legislative Assembly of the State of Sarawak [P.U. (B) 190/2016]" (PDF). Attorney General's Chambers of Malaysia. 25 April 2016. Archived from the original (PDF) on 2017-06-12. "Senarai Calon yang Disahkan Layak Bertanding Pilihan Raya Dewan Undangan Negeri ke-11". Election Commission of Malaysia. 25 April 2016. Archived from the original on 25 April 2016.

Sarawak state election, 2011: Krian
Party	Candidate	Votes	%	∆%
PKR	Ali Biju	5,178	60.16	▲60.16
BN	Peter Nyarok Entrie	3,088	35.88	▼28.09
SNAP	Liman Sujang	216	2.51	▼33.52
Independent	Banyi Beriak	125	1.45	▲1.45
Total valid votes		8,607	100.00	
Total rejected ballots		67		
Unreturned ballots		14		
Turnout		8,688	78.87	▲6.39
Registered electors		11,016		
Majority		2,090	24.28	▼3.65
PKR gain from BN		Swing		?
Source(s) "Federal Government Gazette - Results of Contested Election and Statements of the Poll after the Official Addition of Votes Sarawak [P.U. (B) 245/2011]" (PDF). Attorney General's Chambers of Malaysia. 29 April 2011.

Sarawak state election, 2006: Krian
Party	Candidate	Votes	%	∆%
BN	Peter Nyarok Entrie	4,784	63.97	▼2.38
SNAP	Edmund Stanley Jugol Benedict Sandin	2,695	36.03	▲36.03
Total valid votes		7,479	100.00	
Total rejected ballots		76		
Unreturned ballots		4		
Turnout		7,559	72.48	▲0.18
Registered electors		10,429		
Majority		2,089	27.93	▼10.34
BN hold		Swing		

Sarawak state election, 2001: Krian
Party	Candidate	Votes	%	∆%
BN	Peter Nyarok Entrie	5,010	66.35	▲13.02
Independent	Musa Dinggat	2,120	28.08	▼18.59
PKR	Julin Batamin	211	2.79	▲2.79
Independent	John Mols @ Watt Kudit	152	2.01	▲2.01
STAR	Bayang Sungkey	58	0.77	▲0.77
Total valid votes		7,551	100.00	
Total rejected ballots		77		
Unreturned ballots		2		
Turnout		7,630	72.30	▼0.54
Registered electors		10,553		
Majority		2,890	38.27	▲31.61
BN hold		Swing		

Sarawak state election, 1996: Krian
Party	Candidate	Votes	%	∆%
BN	Peter Nyarok Entrie	3,818	53.33	▼2.98
Independent	Musa Dinggat	3,341	46.67	▲46.67
Total valid votes		7,159	100.00	
Total rejected ballots		60		
Unreturned ballots		15		
Turnout		7,234	72.84	▼6.14
Registered electors		9,931		
Majority		477	6.66	▼8.25
BN hold		Swing		

Sarawak state election, 1991: Krian
Party	Candidate	Votes	%	∆%
BN	Peter Nyarok Entrie	3,898	56.31	▲9.23
PBDS	Edmund Langgu Saga	2,866	41.40	▼11.52
NEGARA	Jonathan Mawar Endek	159	2.30	▲2.30
Total valid votes		6,923	100.00	
Total rejected ballots		57		
Unreturned ballots		13		
Turnout		6,993	78.98	▼0.48
Registered electors		8,854		
Majority		1,032	14.91	▲9.07
BN gain from PBDS		Swing		?

Sarawak state election, 1987: Krian
Party	Candidate	Votes	%	∆%
PBDS	Edmund Langgu Saga	3,751	52.92	▲8.09
BN	Peter Nyarok Entrie	3,337	47.08	▲9.50
Total valid votes		7,088	100.00	
Total rejected ballots		71		
Unreturned ballots		0		
Turnout		7,159	79.46	▲4.11
Registered electors		9,010		
Majority		414	5.84	▼1.41
PBDS hold		Swing		

Sarawak state election, 1983: Krian
Party	Candidate	Votes	%	∆%
PBDS	Edmund Langgu Saga	2,752	44.83	▲44.83
BN	Peter Tinggom	2,307	37.58	▲37.58
Independent	John Antau	853	13.90	▲13.90
Independent	Andau Japar	162	2.64	▲2.64
Independent	Solomon Boyong	65	1.06	▲1.06
Total valid votes		6,139	100.00	
Total rejected ballots		77		
Unreturned ballots		0		
Turnout		6,216	75.35	
Registered electors		8,249		
Majority		445	7.25	
PBDS gain from BN		Swing		?

Sarawak state election, 1979: Krian
Party	Candidate	Votes	%	∆%
BN	Dunstan Endawie Enchana	4,496	80.39	▲12.95
Parti Anak Jati Sarawak	Jemeni Sangkan	1,097	19.61	▲19.61
Total valid votes		5,593	100.00	
Total rejected ballots		191		
Unreturned ballots		0		
Turnout		5,784	73.49	▼3.61
Registered electors		7,871		
Majority		3,399	60.77	▲25.89
BN gain from SNAP		Swing		?

Sarawak state election, 1974: Krian
Party	Candidate	Votes	%	∆%
SNAP	Dunstan Endawie Enchana	3,339	67.44	▲4.08
BN	Luke Tungku	1,612	32.56	▲32.56
Total valid votes		4,951	100.00	
Total rejected ballots		356		
Unreturned ballots		0		
Turnout		5,307	77.10	▼2.69
Registered electors		6,883		
Majority		1,727	34.88	▼9.64
SNAP hold		Swing		

Sarawak state election, 1969: Krian
Party	Candidate	Votes	%
SNAP	Dunstan Endawie Enchana	2,933	63.36
PESAKA	Albans Meling Jan	872	18.84
SUPP	Robinson Jelimin Telajan	824	17.80
Total valid votes		4,629	100.00
Total rejected ballots		404	
Unreturned ballots		0	
Turnout		5,033	79.79
Registered electors		6,308	
Majority		2,061	44.52
This was a new constituency created.
