= Kerapa =

- Location within Borneo
- Coordinates: 1.53333°N 111.68333°E
- Country: Malaysia
- State: Sarawak
- Elevation: 311 m (1,020 ft)

Population
  - Total: 500

Kerapa is an Iban longhouse in Betong, Sarawak, Malaysia. It lies approximately 150.3 kilometres (93.4 mi) east of the state capital Kuching. Neighbouring settlements include:

- Lesu 2.6 kilometres (1.6 mi) southwest
- Luing 2.6 kilometres (1.6 mi) southwest
- Temedak 3.7 kilometres (2.3 mi) west
- Gerugu 3.7 kilometres (2.3 mi) south
- Jambu 6.7 kilometres (4.2 mi) northeast

The recent installation of a photoelectric solar panel farm with batteries has opened up VSAT telecommunications (telephony and internet access) to the 500 people in this remote village, which is four hours by river from Betong.
