= Saratok District =

Saratok
- District
- Country: Malaysia
- State: Sarawak
- Division: Betong
- Seat: Saratok

Population (2024)
  - Total: 54,685

Saratok is a district, in Betong Division, Sarawak, Malaysia.

== Demographics ==
Ethnic composition of Saratok District (2024)
Ethnicities / Nationality	Percentage
Malays	10.39%
Iban	60.32%
Bidayuh	0.14%
Melanau	0.08%
Other Bumiputeras	0.04%
Chinese	28.91%
Indians	0%
Others	0%
Non-Malaysian	0.11%

Ethnicity	2024	
Ethnicity	Pop.	%
Malays	5683	10.39%
Iban	32984	60.32%
Bidayuh	79	0.14%
Melanau	45	0.08%
Other Bumiputeras	21	0.04%
Chinese	15812	28.91%
Indians	0	0%
Others	0	0%
Malaysian total	54624	99.89%
Non-Malaysian	61	0.11%
Total	54685	100.00%

Historical population
Year	Pop.	±%
1990	10,873	—
1995	18,264	+68.0%
2004	26,739	+46.4%
2010	34,150	+27.7%
2015	40,382	+18.2%
2024	54,685	+35.4%

== Towns and villages ==
=== Saratok ===
The town of Saratok is the seat of the district and houses the Saratok District Office.

=== Lichok ===
St James Chapel was one of the oldest Anglican chapels in Sarawak. The Church started several schools in the area before World War II.
