= Pelawa =

Coordinates: 7°18′N 80°34′E

- Village
- Interactive map of Pelawa
- Country: Sri Lanka
- Province: Central Province
- Time zone: UTC+5:30 (Sri Lanka Standard Time)

Pelawa is a village in Sri Lanka. It is located within Central Province.

== Administration ==
Administratively, Pelawa falls under the jurisdiction of the Yatinuwara Divisional Secretariat. For local governance, the settlement area is split into distinct wards and local administrative units, including Pelawa Ihalagama (Grama Niladhari Division No. 140) and Pelawa Pahalagama (Grama Niladhari Division No. 143), which form part of the Yatinuwara Pradeshiya Sabha.

== Geography ==
The village is situated in the midland region of the island's central highlands at an average elevation of approximately 525 metres (1,722 ft) above sea level. It is located directly south of the historically significant village of Gannoruwa. The local geography features the undulating terrain, valleys, and hilly slopes characteristic of the Kandy region.

== See also ==
- List of towns in Central Province, Sri Lanka
