= Tanjong =

International conglomerate headquartered in Malaysia

Tanjong plc
- Formerly: Tanjong Tin Dredging Limited
- Type: Private Limited Company
- Founded: 1926
- Headquarters: Level 30, Menara Maxis, Kuala Lumpur City Centre, 50088 Kuala Lumpur, Malaysia
- Products: Power generation, Gaming, Leisure, Property investment
- Parent: Tanjong Capital Sdn Bhd
- Website: www.tanjongplc.com

Tanjong Public Limited Company is a Malaysian power generation, entertainment, and real estate conglomerate. It was founded as Tanjong Tin Dredging Ltd on 2 January 1926 in England. The company subsequently changed its name to Tanjong PLC in 1991, following a corporate restructure. Tanjong shares were formerly listed on the Bursa Malaysia and London Stock Exchange.

The company's principal activities include the operation of Pan Malaysian Pools Sdn Bhd, a Malaysian lottery business. They have diversified into power generation plants, property investment, and liquefied petroleum gas distribution.

== Power generation ==
Through its subsidiary, Tanjong plc owns and operates 13 power generation plants located throughout Middle East, North Africa, South Asia and Asia.

== Subsidiaries ==
- TGV Cinemas
- Tropical Islands Resort
- Impian Klasik Sdn. Bhd. (67%)
