= Saratok =

- Town and district capital
- Seal

- Location in Malaysia
- Coordinates: 1°44′24″N 111°20′13.2″E
- Country: Malaysia
- State: Sarawak
- Division: Betong
- District: Saratok
- Elevation: 10 m (33 ft)

Population (2020)
  - Total: 54,400
- Time zone: UTC+8 (MST)
  - Summer (DST): UTC+8 (Not observed)

Saratok is a town, and the capital of the Saratok District (1,586.9 square kilometres) in Betong Division, Sarawak, East Malaysia in the island of Borneo. The last recorded district population was 54,400 (year 2020 census). It is located about 50 kilometres (31 mi) from Betong. Iban forms the majority of the population (51%) with Malay (40%), Chinese (7%), Bidayuh and Melanau minorities.

A majority of the Iban people live in longhouses in rural areas, planting paddy, pepper and tapping rubber to earn a living. Some of the Ibans in Saratok either work on or own palm oil plantations. Generally, the Malay community live near rivers, fishing and planting pineapples, cocoa and coconut. A majority of the shopkeepers in Saratok town are Chinese.

== Events ==
Saratok, a town district sandwiched between Sarikei and Betong of about 300 km away from Kuching is inhabited by predominantly by a majority of Iban descent. Over the few decades, Saratok which was a sleepy town, is now a busy and bustling municipality with economic activities, festivities and other events signaling a wave of development coming to the area. However, Saratok maintains its cultural heritage and diverse wildlife.

Saratok boasts itself as powerhouse in palm oil production and one of its main drivers of the local economy. Blessed with fertile land, majority of its people are cultivating oil palm which is evidenced in their well being especially the longhouse dwellers. However to complement the growing activity, there are plans to strengthen its agriculture sector by building and upgrading more agriculture road to pave way for other crops such as paddy and coconut as there are lots of unused land and in such a design to increase more income to the rural people of Saratok.

To display its cultural heritage, Saratok organizes the annual Pesta Saratok, which includes the Regatta Saratok longboat race. The event attracts spectators and participants from across the state, generating an estimated RM 600,000.00 to RM 1.2 million for the local economy. Additional activities include local games and exhibitions such as Gasing and Slingshot, cultural shows, and musical performances by local artists.

Saratok is also known for its care to environment. Saratok maintains its diversification by preserving certain parts of the forest to be remain untouched. The line between progress and preservation however need to dealt with delicately as needs of the people are to be addressed while maintaining balance with environment.

== Facilities ==
There are three secondary schools and three primary schools in Saratok town and a number of rural primary schools. Saratok also have a pre-university college (Kolej Tingkatan Enam).

There are also Saratok Community Hospital, Klinik Welcare, Klinik PMG, and more other facilities within the town.

There are also four banks in Saratok town (BSN, Agro Bank, Hong Leong Bank, & Bank Rakyat ATM).

== Transport ==
=== Local bus ===
Route No.	Operating Route	Operator	Remark
7	Sarikei-Saratok	Borneo Bus	

== Climate ==
Saratok has a tropical rainforest climate (Af) with heavy to very heavy rainfall year-round.

Climate data for Saratok
Month	Jan	Feb	Mar	Apr	May	Jun	Jul	Aug	Sep	Oct	Nov	Dec	Year
Mean daily maximum °C (°F)	30.1 (86.2)	30.3 (86.5)	31.3 (88.3)	32.1 (89.8)	32.5 (90.5)	32.3 (90.1)	32.2 (90.0)	32.0 (89.6)	31.9 (89.4)	31.7 (89.1)	31.5 (88.7)	30.8 (87.4)	31.6 (88.8)
Daily mean °C (°F)	26.2 (79.2)	26.3 (79.3)	27.0 (80.6)	27.4 (81.3)	27.8 (82.0)	27.5 (81.5)	27.2 (81.0)	27.1 (80.8)	27.2 (81.0)	27.1 (80.8)	27.0 (80.6)	26.5 (79.7)	27.0 (80.6)
Mean daily minimum °C (°F)	22.4 (72.3)	22.4 (72.3)	22.7 (72.9)	22.8 (73.0)	23.1 (73.6)	22.7 (72.9)	22.3 (72.1)	22.3 (72.1)	22.5 (72.5)	22.6 (72.7)	22.5 (72.5)	22.3 (72.1)	22.6 (72.6)
Average rainfall mm (inches)	364 (14.3)	283 (11.1)	276 (10.9)	253 (10.0)	264 (10.4)	169 (6.7)	171 (6.7)	277 (10.9)	262 (10.3)	279 (11.0)	303 (11.9)	405 (15.9)	3,306 (130.1)
Source: Climate-Data.org

== Notable people ==
Notable people from Saratok include:

- YBhg. Datuk Amar Dunstan Endawie Enchana, former Deputy Chief Minister
- Late Dato Sri Peter Tinggom, Former Minister of Public Work Malaysia
- Datuk Peter Nyarok, Former Minister of Agriculture, Sarawak
- Datuk Wahab Aziz, Pro-Chancellor UiTM Sarawak
- Late MP Jelaing Mersat, Former Deputy Minister of Transport Malaysia
- Abang Sallehuddin Abg Shokeran - Former DBP General Director
- Former MP Dato Sri Edmund Langgu Ak Saga
- YB Datuk Ali Biju, Currently MP Saratok & Former Deputy Minister Of Energy And Natural Resources
- YB Friday Belik, currently ADUN Krian
- YB Mohd. Bin Duri. currently ADUN Kalaka
- YB Datuk Mohd. Chee Kadir currently ADUN Kabong
