= Betong Division =

Administrative division of Sarawak, Malaysia

Coordinates: 1°39′26.9″N 111°19′44.7″E

Betong
- Administrative division
- Division of Sarawak

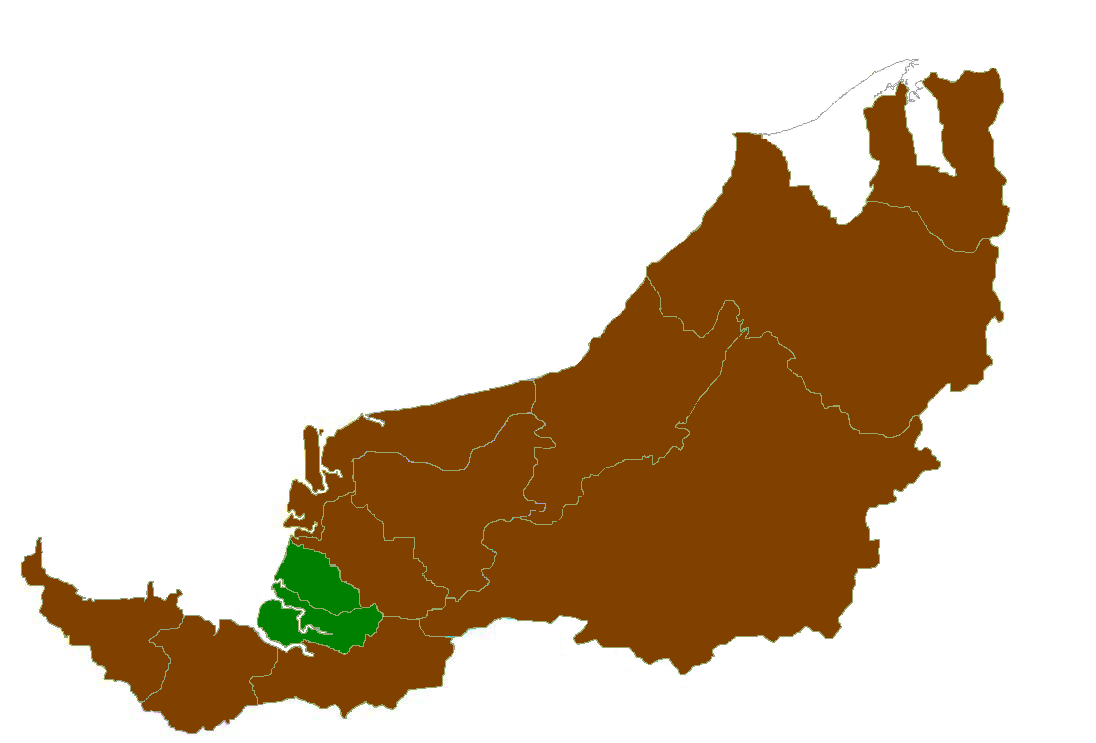
- Country: Malaysia
- State: Sarawak
- Resident Office location: Betong
- Local area government(s): Majlis Daerah Betong or Majlis Daerah Saratok

Area
  - Total: 4,180.8 km^{2} (1,614.2 sq mi)

Population (2008 (estimate))
  - Total: 116,700
  - Density: 27.91/km^{2} (72.30/sq mi)
- Ethnicity: Malay (51.5%), Iban (43.6%), Chinese (4.8%), Others (1.1%)

Betong Division, formed on 26 March 2002, is one of the twelve administrative divisions in Sarawak, Malaysia. Formerly part of Sri Aman Division, Betong is in the Saribas area. It has a total area of 4,180.8 square kilometres, and is the smallest of the administrative divisions of Sarawak.

Saribas is famous for its Iban longhouses and is regarded as the center for Iban culture. It was annexed to Sarawak by Rajah James Brooke, after his victory over the Sekrang and Saribas Iban at the Battle of Beting Maru on 31 July 1849.

Betong Division contains four administrative districts: Betong, Kabong, Pusa, and Saratok. The total population is 99,800. The population is culturally mixed, with the majority Iban interacting well with the Malay and Chinese in almost all spheres of activity since the pre-colonial days.

In Sarawak, Betong has the most administrative sub-districts. The sub-districts under Betong district are Pusa, Spaoh, Debak and Meludam, while those under Saratok district are Roban, Kabong and Budu.

There is about 222 longhouses in Betong division.

== Demography ==
The population of Betong Division (year 2008 estimate) was 116,700.

=== Ethnics ===
Betong division is traditionally a home to Iban and Malay people. Most Ibans are scattered throughout rural areas of Betong and Saratok. Whilst, Malay people are concentrated at the town and major village areas in Betong (especially at Pusa and Maludam area) and Saratok. Chinese people are more concentrated at town areas, such as at Betong and Saratok, while some resides at Pusa. Other races such as Bidayuh, Melanau and Orang Ulu are not native to Betong division. However, due to migration all over Sarawak, more and more of them coming to Betong to settle.

Foreign workers is a rare sight in Betong division. Many of them work in palm oil plantations.

Population of Betong by Ethnics
Administrative District	Total Population	Malay	Iban	Bidayuh	Melanau	Other Bumiputera	Chinese	Other Non-Bumiputera	Non-Citizen
Betong	67,400 (57.8%)	39,600 (58.8%)	25,100 (37.2%)	300 (0.4%)	100 (0.1%)	100 (0.1%)	2,100 (3.1%)	0 (0.0%)	100 (0.1%)
Saratok	49,300 (42.2%)	20,500 (41.6%)	25,800 (52.3%)	100 (0.2%)	200 (0.4%)	100 (0.2%)	2,500 (5.1%)	0 (0.0%)	200 (0.2%)
Total Betong Division	116,700 (100%)	60,100 (51.4%)	50,900 (43.6%)	400 (0.4%)	300 (0.1%)	200 (0.1%)	4,600 (3.1%)	0 (0.0%)	300 (0.1%)

=== Members of Parliament ===
Parliament	Member of Parliament	Party
P201 Batang Lupar	YB Mohamad Shafizan Kepli	GPS (PBB)
P203 Lubok Antu	YB Roy Angau Gingkoi	GPS (PRS)
P204 Betong	YB Richard Rapu	GPS (PBB)
P205 Saratok	YB Datuk Ali Biju	PPBM

== Geography and economy ==
Betong Division is divided into three broad topographical regions — the coastal or riverine region, the midland region, and the inland or hilly interior region. The coastal or riverine region is mainly made up of peat swamp with very limited suitable area for agricultural activities in its natural condition. In areas with improved irrigation systems, the soil has gradually improved to enable some agricultural activities to be carried out. Some of the crops planted in the coastal or riverine region are wet paddy, sago, coconuts and perennial crops. Some of the coastal or riverine areas have potential for aquaculture activities such as brackish water fish, tiger prawn and crab cultivation. The midland region has more suitable areas for agricultural activities. Crops such as pepper, rubber, paddy, and oil palm are planted in the midland region. Most of the livestock and pond fish rearing are also found in this region. All the commercial livestock in the division area are in this region. The inland or hilly interior region is mountainous with steep terrain and only pockets of the areas are cultivated with hilly paddy, pepper and rubber.

== Transportation ==
Although Betong is well connected to other parts of Sarawak with good networks of road, river transports still play the vital role in Betong. People of Betong District can opt for rural shuttle bus service to Saratok, even to neighbouring Sarikei and Sri Aman division.

As for people who wish to travel to upriver areas which are inaccessible by road, they have to use available ferry and boat services. River transport charges remain high in Betong Division due to the long distance of the upriver areas.

There are some rural areas which are accessible by timber tracks and palm estate roads. Availability of transports to these areas are limited through bookings at Betong town, using private vans or four-wheel drive vehicles.

== Infrastructure ==
Pan-Borneo Highway is a trunk road linking Betong to the rest of Sarawak. Betong District is growing rapidly due to being upgraded from a district to a full division status.

=== Education ===
Betong Division has a moderate number of public schools. Primary schools are scattered throughout Betong and Saratok. Some of them are located deep in the Betong district's interior to cater for rural students.

==== Primary schools ====
- SK St. Augustine, Betong
- SK Abang Abdul Kadir, Betong
- SJK (C) Chung Hua, Betong
- SJK (C) Chung Hua, Debak
- SJK (C) Chung Hua, Meludam
- SJK (C) Chung Hua, Pusa
- SJK (C) Chung Hua, Spaoh

SK Belingan, Spaoh SK Tg Assam, Spaoh SK Bungin, Spaoh SK Sebemban, Spaoh, SK Serembang, Spaoh SK Manggut, Spaoh SK Buda, Spaoh SK Supa, Pusa SK Medang, Pusa SK Beladin, Pusa SK Tui, Debak SK Dit, Debak SK Tambak, Debak SK Suri, Debak. SK Serabang, Pusa SK Beladin, Pusa SK Sepinang, Pusa SK Semarang, Pusa

==== Secondary schools ====
- SM Teknik Betong
- MRSM Betong
- SMK Ulu Layar
- SMK Kalaka
- SMK Saratok
- SMK Kabong
- SMK (BM) Saratok
- SMK St. Augustine (M)
- SMK Spaoh
- SMK Datuk Patinggi Kedit
- SMK Beladin
- SMK Pusa
- SMK Saribas

=== Healthcare ===
Betong District has two government hospital which are Betong Hospital and Saratok Hospital, and two government policlinic at each towns. There are no private-owned hospital. As for sub-districts, some has their own health clinic. Smaller government health clinics do exist at major villages and settlement areas.

=== Security ===
Betong division has a police divisional office or IPD. There are also police stations and police bits located at strategic locations, as well as rural areas.

=== Government services ===
Many government offices have set up their branches in Betong Division (fairly at both Betong and Saratok districts) such as Royal Customs, Fire and Rescue Department, Education Department, etc.

== See also ==
- Sarawak
- Betong District
- Saratok District
