= Robert Lau Hui Yew =

Malaysian politician (born 1965)

Yang Berhormat Senator Tuan Robert Lau Hui Yew

Senator Appointed by the Yang di-Pertuan Agong
- Incumbent
- Assumed office 16 May 2024
- Monarch: Ibrahim
- Prime Minister: Anwar Ibrahim
- In office 22 June 2020 – 21 June 2023
- Monarch: Abdullah
- Prime Minister: Muhyiddin Yassin (2020–2021); Ismail Sabri Yaakob (2021–2022); Anwar Ibrahim (2022–2023)

Personal details
- Born: 1965 (age 60–61) Sarawak, Malaysia
- Party: Sarawak United Peoples' Party (SUPP)
- Other political affiliations: Barisan Nasional (until 2018); Gabungan Parti Sarawak (since 2018)
- Spouse: Lucinda Lau (married 1996)
- Relations: Robert Lau Hoi Chew (second cousin)
- Education: Sacred Heart National Secondary School
- Alma mater: University of Hull
- Occupation: Politician
- Profession: Lawyer

Robert Lau Hui Yew or commonly known as Robert Lau Junior is a Malaysian politician and lawyer who has served as a Senator in his second term, first from June 2020 until June 2023 and since May 2024. He is a member, Division Chief of Bawang Assan and a Central Working Committee member of the Sarawak United Peoples' Party (SUPP), a component party of the Gabungan Parti Sarawak (GPS) coalition.

== Election results ==
Parliament of Malaysia
Year	Constituency	Candidate	Votes	Pct	Opponent(s)	Votes	Pct	Ballots cast	Majority	Turnout
2010	P212 Sibu	Robert Lau Hui Yew (SUPP)	18,447	49.16%	Wong Ho Leng (DAP)	50.22%	39.66%	38,111	398	69.68%
2010	P212 Sibu	Robert Lau Hui Yew (SUPP)	18,447	49.16%	Narawi Haron (IND)	232	0.62%	38,111	398	69.68%

Sarawak State Legislative Assembly
Year	Constituency	Candidate	Votes	Pct	Opponent(s)	Votes	Pct	Ballots cast	Majority	Turnout
2021	N53 Bawang Assan	Robert Lau Hui Yew (SUPP)	5,039	36.61%	Wong Soon Koh (PSB)	5,952	43.25%	13,763	913	70.18%
2021	N53 Bawang Assan	Robert Lau Hui Yew (SUPP)	5,039	36.61%	Amy Lau Bik Yieng (DAP)	1,173	8.52%	13,763	913	70.18%
2021	N53 Bawang Assan	Robert Lau Hui Yew (SUPP)	5,039	36.61%	Michelle Ling Shyan Mih (PBK)	954	6.93%	13,763	913	70.18%
2021	N53 Bawang Assan	Robert Lau Hui Yew (SUPP)	5,039	36.61%	Ricky Enteri (IND)	645	4.69%	13,763	913	70.18%

== See also ==
- Members of the Dewan Negara, 14th Malaysian Parliament
- Members of the Dewan Negara, 15th Malaysian Parliament
