= 2010 Sibu by-election =

2010 by-election in Sibu, Malaysia

Sibu by-election
- 16 May 2010

Sibu parliamentary seat
	PH	BN	IND
Candidate	Wong Ho Leng	Robert Lau Hui Yew	Narawi Haron
Party	Democratic Action Party (Malaysia)	Sarawak United Peoples' Party	Independent
Alliance	Pakatan Rakyat Bersatu	Barisan Nasional	0
Popular vote	18,845	18,447	232
Percentage	49.7%	48.7%	0.6%
MP before election
Robert Lau Hoi Chew
BN
Subsequent MP
Wong Ho Leng
DAP

The Sibu by-election, 2010 was a by-election for the seat of Sibu in the Parliament of Malaysia.

The Sarawak-based seat fell vacant after the death of its incumbent member, Robert Lau Hoi Chew, from liver cancer on 9 April 2010. The seat was defended for the Barisan Nasional coalition government by Robert Lau Hui Yew of the Sarawak United Peoples' Party (SUPP), while Sarawak State Assemblyman Wong Ho Leng contested the poll for the Democratic Action Party (DAP) in the Pakatan Rakyat opposition coalition. Wong won the election by 398 votes, wresting the seat from the Barisan Nasional. At the time of the election there were 54,695 registered voters, a majority of whom were ethnic Chinese. In the previous general election in 2008, the incumbent, Hoi Chew retained the seat with a 3,235-vote majority against Wong Ho Leng, and Lim Chin Chuang of the People's Justice Party. The Sibu seat had been last won by the DAP in 1982, but had since been won continuously by the SUPP. In this election, known as the "Battle of the Mighty Rejang", the government and opposition went head-to-head on a number of local issues concerning Sarawak, including poverty, education and development.

== Background and history ==
The Sibu constituency has been dominated by the contest between the SUPP and the DAP for approximately three decades. The DAP won the seat in the 1982 general election when Ling Sie Ming defeated Wong Soon Kai by 141 votes, causing Sibu to become the first DAP-held parliamentary seat in Sarawak. The DAP lost the seat in the 1986 election to the Barisan Nasional, and in the 1990 election won the seat through Robert Lau Hoi Chew. Lau held the seat until his death from liver cancer on 9 April 2010. His winning margin in the 2008 election had been 3,235 votes.

Despite Lau's dominance of the federal seat from 1990, the SUPP was shocked in the 1996 state election when two of its State Assembly seats within Sibu town — Pelawan and Bukit Assek — fell to DAP. The Bukit Assek loss saw the defeat of their president and the then-Deputy Chief Minister of Sarawak, Wong Soon Kai. The defeat spelled the end of Wong's political career and the election of the DAP's Wong Ho Leng to the Sarawak State Assembly. Wong Ho Leng subsequently lost the Bukit Assek seat in the 2001 state election, but regained it in 2006.

At the time of the by-election, 66.7% of the seat's 54,695 registered voters were ethnic Chinese; the rest of the population being Malays or indigenous Sarawakians. Christians make up 53 per cent of the electorate while the rest include Muslims, Buddhists and other religions. The seat was largely urban.

== Nomination of candidates ==
The by-election was triggered by the death of Sibu's incumbent Member of Parliament, Robert Lau Hoi Chew on 9 April 2010. The Election Commission subsequently set down the by-election for 16 May 2010, with candidate nominations to occur on 8 May. Within a few days, the Sibu branch of SUPP recommended Robert Lau Hui Yew to contest the by-election for the governing Barisan Nasional coalition. Hui Yew was the second cousin of Hoi Chew and the son of Lau Swee Nguong, Chairman of the KTS Group of companies. On 14 April, the opposition has decided that a DAP candidate should contest the by-election. Opposition Leader and People's Justice Party (PKR) adviser Datuk Seri Anwar Ibrahim scheduled a visit to Sibu on 18 April. On the same day, Sarawak Pakatan Rakyat was formed as an opposition coalition composed of the DAP, PKR, and the Pan-Malaysian Islamic Party (PAS) — all members of the national Pakatan Rakyat coalition — and the local Sarawak National Party. The Deputy Prime Minister of Malaysia, Tan Sri Muhyiddin Yassin visited Sibu on 19 April, expressing confidence that the voters were leaning towards supporting Barisan Nasional.

While SUPP's candidate was confirmed only a few days after Hoi Chew's death, DAP delayed announcing their candidate until 27 April. SUPP alleged the delay was due to a split in DAP; however, DAP insisted the delay was a calculated political strategy. On 27 April, the Sarawak Pakatan Rakyat announced Wong Ho Leng, State Chairman of Sarawak DAP and State Assemblyman for Bukit Assek, as its candidate. Wong had earlier indicated his reluctance to stand in the by-election, suggesting that the party should consider the opportunity to field a younger candidate.

Robert Lau Hui Yew and Wong Ho Leng were joined by an independent candidate, Narawi Haron. A businessman and former member of the Army, Narawi had been a candidate for the seat in the 1995 election. Narawi's campaign was dismissed by the SUPP as inconsequential, while the DAP admitted that a potential split of votes between the DAP and Narawi could hurt its chances.

== Election campaign issues ==
The by-election was widely known as the "Battle of the Mighty Rejang" and was seen as a litmus test for the popularity of the opposition Pakatan Rakyat and governing Barisan Nasional coalitions on a including land rights, poverty, native displacement and unemployment in Sarawak.

One of the main issues during the election was the ban of the use of the word 'Allah' in Christian publications. However, the Sarawak police has banned political parties from using the issue during campaigning in the by-election as it was deemed to be a sensitive issue. Sarawak's Officer in Charge of Criminal Investigations, Huzir Mohamed, threatened to prosecute offenders of the ban under the Sedition Act or the Internal Security Act (ISA).

=== Barisan Nasional ===
The Barisan Nasional did not initially release a policy manifesto for the by-election, but sought support on the basis of its claim to have caused Sibu's economic growth and development. Nevertheless, late in the campaign, the BN-SUPP candidate, Robert Lau Hui Yew, himself released a manifesto in which, according to Bernama, he mentioned that he would prioritise "getting more investment, job creation, skills training for single parents to increase their income, install more CCTVs in town to improve security and reduce street crimes rates as well as to transform Sibu into a 'wireless' township."

During the campaign period, Prime Minister Datuk Seri Najib Tun Razak had distributed RM18 million to 60 Chinese aided primary schools, five independent Chinese secondary schools and two missionary schools in Sibu. Najib said that the Barisan Nasional government would continue to do more for Chinese education in the country, saying that "the Barisan government is a true friend of Chinese education," when addressing more than 3,000 Chinese educationists. Besides that, some 246 families living in an under-developed region in Sungai Igan within the constituency had received a total of RM147,600 as a one-off allocation from the Federal Government. Four Methodist churches in town had been given special grants totalling RM1.75 million from the BN federal government in the final hours of the by-election campaign.

The SUPP attacked the DAP on the basis of its coalition with the Islamist PAS, arguing that "A vote for Rocket is a vote for Islamic State". Lim Kit Siang, the parliamentary leader of the DAP, said that the issue was a "killer weapon" which could "finish off" the chances of DAP's candidate winning by frightening off the Chinese and non-Muslim voters in Sibu as it did during the 1999 Malaysian General Election where both Karpal Singh and Lim himself lost their parliamentary seats. The SUPP also claimed that if the DAP was to be voted in kampua noodles could no longer be sold as they were mixed with pork lard; a reference to PAS's policy to establish Malaysia as an Islamic state.

Abdul Taib Mahmud, the BN chief minister of Sarawak, revised new land renewal rates which took effect on June 1. He said that the Sarawak new land rates is the cheapest in Malaysia as compared to other states. In accordance with opposition proposal for the unconditioned, automatic renewal of land leases, he also challenged the opposition-led state governments to announce new land rates lower than the current one announced by himself, without risking the income of the state governments.

Najib Tun Razak, the Prime Minister and leader of BN, promised voters in Rejang Park, a DAP stronghold, 5 million ringgit to alleviate floods if SUPP's Robert Lau Hui Yew won the seat, stating at an election appearance: "Do we have a deal or not? We do! You want the RM5 million, I want Robert Lau to win.”

=== Democratic Action Party ===
The DAP set out a seven-point manifesto with the theme "Sibu Jom Ubah" or "Sibu4change" for the by-election campaign and on the top of it is solving the town's flood woes in two years when the party and its coalition becomes the government at the federal and state levels. Another point in the manifesto stated that DAP would provide all Sarawakians aged above 60 a minimum of RM100 per annum as a gift for their contributions to the state. A minimum wage of RM750 per month for workers in the peninsula and RM830 for workers in Sarawak will be introduced and on education, DAP promised that all schools would be given allocations according to their needs as practised in Penang, Selangor and Kelantan. The three other points in the manifesto concerned oil royalty, land reform, and competency, accountability and transparency in governance.

The DAP also focused on landholding issues. Chong Chieng Jen, the director of the DAP's by-election campaign, pointed out that those who decided not to renew their 60-year land leases would have their land returned to the government without compensation, and that even if the government approved requests to have leases renewed, landholders would have to pay large premiums. Chong said that the DAP on the other hand wanted the current state land code to be amended to allow for the automatic and unconditional renewal of all leased land for a period of 99 years.

On the ban of using the "Allah" issue during campaigns, the DAP had gone against it and had gone ahead with the issue in its campaign. Wong Ho Leng, the DAP election candidate, said that the facts must be made known to the public. Wong also promised that if elected, he would call upon the Prime Minister and Home Minister to immediately cease the legal dispute with the Christian churches over these matters to protect the freedom of religion in Malaysia for non-Muslims. The DAP has also challenge candidate Robert Lau to make his stand about the ban on non-Muslims using the word "Allah" with DAP MP Teresa Kok stating that "If Robert Lau intends to be a Member of Parliament that speaks up for a Christian-majority constituency, Sibu, then he has the moral duty to declare his stand on this thorny issue, so that the voters in Sibu can decide whether they can count on him to speak up on this issue," Another issue that was brought up during the by-election was the decision of the Home Ministry to destroy the 5,000 copies of Indonesian Bibles confiscated.

On SUPP's questioning DAP's association with PAS despite having different ideology, the DAP defended itself by stating that PAS has been steadfast in the rights to freedom of religion of non-Muslims and this can be seen through PAS being able to declare that there is absolutely nothing in the Quran which forbids the use of the term "Allah" in Christian publications.

The DAP sought to pressure Robert Lau Hui Yew over the government's proposed Goods and Services Tax, arguing that the tax would increase prices for consumers in one of Malaysia's poorest states. The DAP, through its leader Lim Kit Siang also pressured Hui Yew to speak up against the government's education policy, claiming that Hui Yew's choice to have his children educated overseas demonstrated his lack of confidence in Malaysian education. On education, the DAP also criticised SUPP's involvement in the sale of the Laila Taib College, previously known as United College Sarawak, to the Yayasan Sarawak (Sarawak Foundation) for the price of one ringgit, when the local Chinese population had donated money to fund the college's building.

== Results ==
The election was won by Wong Ho Leng by a margin of 398 votes over Robert Lau Hui Yew. The result was seen as a surprise win for the DAP and the opposition, as it ended a run of by-election defeats for the Pakatan Rakyat parties and boosted the DAP ahead of the state elections due to be held in Sarawak in 2011. The victorious Wong claimed his election was a "miracle". 37,919 out of 54,695 registered voters cast a ballot, signifying a 70% turnout. There were 395 spoilt votes.

Malaysian general by-election, 16 May 2010: Sibu The by-election was called due to the death of incumbent, Robert Lau Hoi Chew.
Party	Candidate	Votes	%	∆%
DAP	Wong Ho Leng	18,845	50.22	
BN	Robert Lau Hui Yew	18,447	49.16	
Independent	Narawi Haron	232	0.62	
Total valid votes		37,524	100.00	
Total rejected ballots		395		
Unreturned ballots		192		
Turnout		38,111	69.68	
Registered electors		54,695		
Majority		398		
DAP gain from BN		Swing		?
Source(s) "Pilihan Raya Kecil P.212 Sibu". Election Commission of Malaysia.

=== Postal votes controversy ===
The announcement of the result was marred by a two-hour-long delay because of arguments over the discrepancies of the postal votes by Pakatan Rakyat election agents. Of the 2,827 ballot papers issued for postal votes, BN won 2,323 votes (82.2%), DAP won 70 (2.4%), the independent won 36 (1.2%) while 208 (7.3%) were considered spoilt.

Pahang PKR secretariat director Zaidi Ahmad, who was appointed by the party as the team leader in charge of monitoring the postal votes during the polls, mentioned that the DAP would not have won if the 208 postal votes were not declared spoilt and the 170 ballot papers for what he claimed were "phantom postal voters" were returned and added to the tally.

Zaidi had claimed that the forms state the names, identification numbers and information about the voters and are supposed to be signed by the voters themselves as well as their witnesses. However, the election agents noticed that the same witness would sign differently on different forms. On some forms, the voters themselves did not even sign them. Zaidi concluded by saying that it meant that others had signed on their behalf. He added that only after persistent complaints from the PR's election agents, Election Commission officials agreed to consider 208 ballot papers from the postal votes as spoilt votes. He also said that they have found at least between 700 and 800 more postal votes that had discrepancies but the EC disallowed these from being considered as spoilt. Zaidi finally claimed that if the by-election had truly been run properly, DAP could have won with a much bigger majority as if at least 700 more postal votes were rejected as spoilt, DAP could have won the polls with a majority of a little over 1,000.

As a result, the Election Commission would review the postal voting system where EC chairman Tan Sri Abdul Aziz Mohd Yusof said they would study the proposal to call for an early voting session for army personnel, policemen and EC staff instead of posting votes. Nevertheless, the Youth wing of PAS have demanded for the postal votes to be abolished altogether as it claims that the postal votes are no longer relevant and is prone to abuse and exploitation by the government to their benefit.

== Aftermath ==
With the win of the DAP's candidate, there were various responses from the community. While there is fear by the local Chinese community leaders that BN's defeat in Sibu would affect the town's growth, others like the opposition take it as a good omen as BN can no longer take Sarawak as its "fixed-deposit" in terms of parliamentary seats and neglect the state's development. Chua Soi Lek of the Malaysian Chinese Association, a member of the BN, said that the government could no longer hide from the fact that there were issues plaguing the Chinese community and that it can no longer be swept under the carpet following the losing of Chinese-majority polling centres in the by-election.

Lim Kit Siang of the DAP mentioned that the party's win in Sibu renews Pakatan Rakyat's Putrajaya dream, referring to PR's ambition to form the Federal government in the next 13th general election. However, political scientists mentioned that PR would have a tough time getting support from rural areas, referring to the DAP's dismal performance in rural polling centres. Nevertheless, encouraged by the strong support from the urban Chinese community in the Sibu by-election, DAP is now aiming to win the four other Chinese-majority parliamentary seats (namely the Sarikei, Miri, Stampin and Lanang seats) and seven other State constituencies held by SUPP in Sarawak.

Abdul Taib Mahmud, the BN Chief Minister of Sarawak, said that the BN lost mainly due to the influx of PR campaigners from Peninsular Malaysia. Abang Johari Openg, Sarawak state Minister for Housing and Urban Development, blamed the "provocative tactics" allegedly employed by Pakatan Rakyat leaders for causing the defeat of the SUPP candidate, referring to the raising of the 'Allah' issue. President of Parti Rakyat Sarawak (a component party of BN in Sarawak) and state Minister of Land Development James Masing had warned Peninsular Malaysia-based opposition parties to refrain from practising "rowdy" politics in Sarawak saying that it might break down social order in the country, citing the May 13 incident where a racial riot occurred when BN lost its two-thirds supermajority in parliament during the 1969 Malaysian general election.

As for the SUPP, its president George Chan Hong Nam who congratulated its winning candidate Wong immediately after the election result was announced, said that his party was completely overwhelmed by DAP's streetfighter style of politics and said, "these outsiders with their street culture have come to spoil the good nature of Sarawakians," and that "SUPP would do all it could to ensure that the "outsiders" do not gain a foothold here". Wong Soon Koh, the SUPP state assemblyman for the Bawang Assan state seat within Sibu and a minister in the Sarawak state cabinet, claimed that the DAP was now extremely rich and could fly over campaigners from Peninsula Malaysia to Sibu for the by-election. Soon Koh's remarks came under fire by Chong Chieng Jen of the DAP where he defended the party by saying that nearly all DAP campaigners including Members of Parliament, state assemblymen or ordinary members, took care of their own expenses and stayed either with party members in Sibu or in low-budget hotels to save expenses. Chong also said that unlike BN leaders, they do not fly first class, nor stay at five-star hotels which are paid for by the federal or state government under the pretext of carrying out their government duties while on the other hand obviously campaigning for the SUPP candidate.

Ibrahim Ali, the president of Malay rights group Perkasa labelled the Chinese in Sibu as ungrateful for not voting for the BN. He claimed that the Chinese in Sibu had not appreciated the development projects and financial allocations offered by BN while the Bumiputera had to endure and compromise with the wish of Chinese community. His statement however, was met with strong opposition from the local community, including the Bumiputera community, and he was dubbed as 'ignoramus' upon his statement.

Nevertheless, the losing candidate, Lau Hui Yew, pledged that he will continue to serve the people as a councilor of Sibu Municipal Council (SMC) and as a party leader. On the other hand, Muhyiddin Yassin, the Deputy Prime Minister of Malaysia and BN's campaign director in Sibu, said that the BN will keep all promises and commitments made during the by-election even though the party lost the by-election.

== See also ==
- Members of the 12th Malaysian Parliament from Sarawak
