= Deputy Minister of Housing and Local Government (Malaysia) =

Malaysian government deputy minister

- Timbalan Menteri Perumahan dan Kerajaan Tempatan
- Coat of Arms of Government of Malaysia
- Incumbent; Aiman Athirah Sabu since 12 December 2023
- Ministry of Housing and Local Government
- Style: Yang Berhormat
- Member of: Cabinet of Malaysia
- Reports to: Prime Minister; Minister of Housing and Local Government
- Seat: Putrajaya
- Appointer: Yang di-Pertuan Agong on advice of the Prime Minister
- Term length: No fixed term
- Inaugural holder: Ramli Omar (as Deputy Minister of Housing and Villages Development)
- Formation: 1976

The Deputy Minister of Housing and Local Government (Malay: Timbalan Menteri Perumahan dan Kerajaan Tempatan; Chinese: 房屋及地方政府部副部长; Tamil: வீடமைப்பு மற்றும் உள்ளூராட்சி பிரதி அமைச்சர் ) is a Malaysian cabinet position serving as deputy head of the Ministry of Housing and Local Government.

== List of Deputy Ministers of Housing and Local Government ==
The following individuals have been appointed as Deputy Minister of Defence, or any of its precedent titles:

Colour key (for political coalition/parties):

Coalition	Component party	Timeline
Barisan Nasional (BN)	United Malays National Organisation (UMNO)	1973–present
Barisan Nasional (BN)	Malaysian Indian Congress (MIC)	1973–present
Barisan Nasional (BN)	Sarawak United Peoples' Party (SUPP)	1973–2018
Barisan Nasional (BN)	People's Progressive Party (PPP)	1973–2018
Pakatan Harapan (PH)	National Trust Party (AMANAH)	2015–present
Pakatan Harapan (PH)	People's Justice Party (PKR)	2015–present
Perikatan Nasional (PN)	Malaysian Islamic Party (PAS)	2020–present

=== Deputy Minister of Housing and Villages Development ===
Portrait	Name (Birth–Death) Constituency	Political coalition	Political party	Took office	Left office	Prime Minister (Cabinet)
	Ramli Omar (?–?); MP for Bagan Serai	BN	UMNO	1976	1978	Hussein Onn (I)
=== Deputy Minister of Local Government and Federal Territories ===
Portrait	Name (Birth–Death) Constituency	Political coalition	Political party	Took office	Left office	Prime Minister (Cabinet)
	Subramaniam Sinniah (1944–2022); MP for Damansara	BN	MIC	1 January 1978		Hussein Onn (I)
Both are these post was renamed into Deputy Minister of Housing and Local Government
=== Deputy Minister of Housing and Local Government ===
Portrait	Name (Birth–Death) Constituency	Political coalition	Political party	Took office	Left office	Prime Minister (Cabinet)
	Ramli Omar (?–?); MP for Bagan Serai	BN	UMNO	1978		Hussein Onn (II)
	Samy Vellu (1936–2022); MP for Sungei Siput	BN	MIC		15 September 1979	Hussein Onn (II)
	Zakaria Abdul Rahman (?–?); MP for Besut	BN	UMNO			Hussein Onn (II)
	Abdul Jalal Abu Bakar (?–?); MP for Batu Pahat	BN	UMNO	17 July 1981	30 April 1982	Mahathir Mohamad (I)
	Napsiah Omar (1943–2018); MP for Kuala Pilah	BN	UMNO	30 April 1982	20 May 1987	Mahathir Mohamad (II • III)
	Subramaniam Sinniah (1944–2022); MP for Segamat	BN	MIC	30 April 1982	14 August 1989	Mahathir Mohamad (II • III)
	Hussein Ahmad (?–?); Senator	BN	UMNO	20 May 1987	26 October 1990	Mahathir Mohamad (III)
	Osu Sukam (b.1949); MP for Papar	BN	USNO	14 August 1989	26 October 1990	Mahathir Mohamad (III)
	Daud Taha (?–?); MP for Batu Pahat	BN	UMNO	27 October 1990	3 May 1995	Mahathir Mohamad (IIII)
	Osu Sukam (b.1949); MP for Papar	BN	UMNO	27 October 1990	21 August 1994	Mahathir Mohamad (IIII)
	Jeffrey Kitingan (b.1948); Senator	BN	AKAR	21 August 1994	3 May 1995	Mahathir Mohamad (IIII)
	Tajol Rosli Mohd Ghazali (b.1946); MP for Gerik	BN	UMNO	8 May 1995	7 January 1999	Mahathir Mohamad (V)
	Peter Chin Fah Kui (b.1945); MP for Miri	BN	SUPP	8 May 1995	14 December 1999	Mahathir Mohamad (V)
	Shafie Apdal (b.1956); MP for Semporna	BN	UMNO	7 January 1999	14 December 1999	Mahathir Mohamad (V)
	Peter Chin Fah Kui (b.1945); MP for Miri	BN	SUPP	15 December 1999	2 November 2003	Mahathir Mohamad (VI)
	M. Kayveas (b.1954); Senator	BN	PPP	29 September 2001	2 November 2003	Mahathir Mohamad (VI)
	Peter Chin Fah Kui (b.1945); MP for Miri	BN	SUPP	3 November 2003	26 March 2004	Abdullah Ahmad Badawi (I)
	Azizah Mohd Dun (b.1958); MP for Beaufort	BN	UMNO	27 March 2004	18 March 2008	Abdullah Ahmad Badawi (II)
	Robert Lau Hoi Chew (1942–2010); MP for Sibu	BN	SUPP	27 March 2004	18 March 2008	Abdullah Ahmad Badawi (II)
	Hamzah Zainudin (b.1957); MP for Larut	BN	UMNO	19 March 2008	9 April 2009	Abdullah Ahmad Badawi (III)
	Robert Lau Hoi Chew (1942–2010); MP for Sibu	BN	SUPP	19 March 2008	9 April 2009	Abdullah Ahmad Badawi (III)
	Lajim Ukin (1956–2021); MP for Beaufort	BN	UMNO	10 April 2009	30 July 2012	Najib Razak (I)
	Raja Kamarul Bahrin Shah Raja Ahmad (b.1955); Senator	PH	AMANAH	17 July 2018	24 February 2020	Mahathir Mohamad (VII)
	Ismail Abdul Muttalib (b.1954); MP for Maran	BN	UMNO	10 March 2020	16 August 2021	Muhyiddin Yassin (I)
	Ismail Abdul Muttalib (b.1954); MP for Maran	PN	PAS	30 August 2021	24 November 2022	Ismail Sabri Yaakob (I)
	Aiman Athirah Sabu (b.1972); MP for Sepang	PH	AMANAH	13 December 2023	Incumbent	Anwar Ibrahim (I)
post was renamed into Deputy Minister of Urban Wellbeing, Housing, and Local Government
=== Deputy Minister of Urban Wellbeing, Housing, and Local Government ===
Portrait	Name (Birth–Death) Constituency	Political coalition	Political party	Took office	Left office	Prime Minister (Cabinet)
	Halimah Mohamed Sadique (b.1962); MP for Tenggara	BN	UMNO	16 May 2013	9 May 2018	Najib Razak (II)
post was renamed back into Deputy Minister of Housing, and Local Government
post was renamed into Deputy Minister of Housing and Local Government === Deputy Minister of Local Government Development ===
Portrait	Name (Birth–Death) Constituency	Political coalition	Political party	Took office	Left office	Prime Minister (Cabinet)
	Akmal Nasrullah Mohd Nasir (b.1986); MP for Johor Bahru	PH	PKR	10 December 2022	12 December 2023	Anwar Ibrahim (I)
	Aiman Athirah Sabu (b.1972); MP for Sepang	PH	AMANAH	12 December 2023	13 December 2023	Anwar Ibrahim (I)

== See also ==
- Minister of Housing and Local Government (Malaysia)
