= Oscar Ling Chai Yew =

Malaysian politician

Yang Berhormat Tuan Oscar Ling Chai Yew MP
- 林财耀

Member of the Malaysian Parliament for Sibu
- Incumbent
- Assumed office 5 May 2013
- Preceded by: Wong Ho Leng (PR–DAP)
- Majority: 2,841 (2013); 11,422 (2018); 7,760 (2022)

Personal details
- Born: Oscar Ling Chai Yew; 9 October 1977 (age 48) Sibu, Sarawak, Malaysia
- Citizenship: Malaysian
- Party: Democratic Action Party (DAP)
- Other political affiliations: Pakatan Rakyat (PR) (2008–2015); Pakatan Harapan (PH) (since 2015)
- Education: Monash University
- Occupation: Politician

Oscar Ling Chai Yew (simplified Chinese: 林财耀; traditional Chinese: 林財耀; pinyin: Lín Cáiyào; born 9 October 1977) is a Malaysian politician who has served as the Member of Parliament (MP) for Sibu since May 2013. He is a member of the Democratic Action Party (DAP), a component party of the Pakatan Harapan (PH) and formerly Pakatan Rakyat (PR) coalitions.

== Election results ==
Parliament of Malaysia
Year	Constituency	Candidate	Votes	Pct	Opponent(s)	Votes	Pct	Ballots cast	Majority	Turnout
2013	P212 Sibu	Oscar Ling Chai Yew (DAP)	26,808	52.59%	Vincent Lau Lee Ming (SUPP)	23,967	47.01%	51,588	2,841	79.86%
2013	P212 Sibu	Oscar Ling Chai Yew (DAP)	26,808	52.59%	Narawi Haron (IND)	203	0.40%	51,588	2,841	79.86%
2018	P212 Sibu	Oscar Ling Chai Yew (DAP)	33,811	59.58%	Wong Kee Yew (UPP)	22,389	39.45%	57,689	11,422	77.80%
2018	P212 Sibu	Oscar Ling Chai Yew (DAP)	33,811	59.58%	Tiew Yen Houng (PEACE)	377	0.66%	57,689	11,422	77.80%
2018	P212 Sibu	Oscar Ling Chai Yew (DAP)	33,811	59.58%	Tiong Ing Tung (STAR)	176	0.31%	57,689	11,422	77.80%
2022	P212 Sibu	Oscar Ling Chai Yew (DAP)	31,287	47.45%	Clarence Ting Ing Horh (SUPP)	23,527	35.68%	65,942	7,760	62.28%
2022	P212 Sibu	Oscar Ling Chai Yew (DAP)	31,287	47.45%	Wong Soon Koh (PSB)	11,128	16.88%	65,942	7,760	62.28%

== Honours ==
=== Honours of Malaysia ===
- Malaysia
  - Recipient of the 17th Yang di-Pertuan Agong Installation Medal (2024)
