= Parti Ekonomi Rakyat Sarawak Bersatu =

Parti Ekonomi Rakyat Sarawak Bersatu United Sarawak People's Economic Party PERSB
- Abbreviation: PERSB
- Headquarters: Sarawak, Malaysia
- Colours: Blue, yellow, brown, green
- Dewan Negara: 0 / 70
- Dewan Rakyat: 0 / 222
- Sarawak State Legislative Assembly: 0 / 82

The Parti Ekonomi Rakyat Sarawak Bersatu (PERSB) or in English United Sarawak People's Economic Party is a Malaysian political party formed by a group of Jatropha curcas plantation owners in Sarawak under the Projek Ekonomi Rakyat Sarawak (PERS) (English: Sarawak People's Economic Project). It is a relatively new party, was among the latest 20 new parties registration approved by the Registrar of Society (RoS) and just received permission to operate as a political party in 2013.

PERSB has filed their application to the Registrar of Societies (ROS) on 2010, and their application has been approved only in 2013. Somehow 15 of their candidates have contested in 2011 Sarawak state election as Independent candidates however all of their candidates were defeated and lost their deposits on the polling day. Since then, these political party have currently not active until now.
