= 2014 Balingian by-election =

Election in Malaysia

- 29 March 2014

Balingian seat in the Sarawak State Legislative Assembly
	BN	PKR
Candidate	Yussibnosh Balo	Abdul Jalil Bujang
Party	BN (PBB)	PKR
Alliance		PR
Popular vote	8,194	1,283
Percentage	86.46%	13.54%
Batang Air assemblyman before election
Abdul Taib Mahmud
BN (PBB)
Elected Batang Air assemblyman
Yussibnosh Balo
BN (PBB)

A by-election was held for the Sarawak State Assembly seat of Balingian on 29 March 2014 following the nomination day on 17 March 2014. The incumbent assemblyman and former 33-year Chief Minister, Abdul Taib Mahmud resigned from his post on 28 February 2014. The seat was declared vacant after he took his seat as the new Yang di-Pertua Negeri of Sarawak, succeeding Abang Muhammad Salahuddin whose term ended on 28 February. Taib was an assemblyman from the Parti Pesaka Bumiputera Bersatu, a component party of Barisan Nasional. The former chairman of the party, he won by a majority of 5,154 votes against 2 other candidates in the 2011 election.

The election saw a straight fight between Pakatan Rakyat and Barisan Nasional. Yussibnosh Balo represented Parti Pesaka Bumiputera Bersatu while Abdul Jalil Bujang represented Parti Keadilan Rakyat, a component party of Pakatan Rakyat. The by-election campaign was marred by allegations that Chief Minister Adenan Satem abused his power when 4 PKR leaders were barred from entering Sarawak during the campaign period.

Yussibnosh Balo retained the very safe BN seat by a majority of 6,911 votes.

== Results ==
Sarawak state by-election, 29 March 2014: Balingian Upon the resignation of incumbent, Abdul Taib Mahmud
Party	Candidate	Votes	%	∆%
BN	Yussibnosh Balo	8,194	86.46	+ 10.14
PKR	Abdul Jail Bujang	1,283	13.54	+ 2.84
Total valid votes		9,477	100.00	
Total rejected ballots		146		
Unreturned ballots		1		
Turnout		9,624	72.00	
Registered electors		13,366		
Majority		6,911		
BN hold		Swing		{{{2}}}
Source(s) "Pilihan Raya Kecil N.51 Balingian". Election Commission of Malaysia. Archived from the original on 2018-09-19. "Federal Government Gazette - Notice of Contested Election - By-election of the State Legislative Assembly of N.51 Balingian for the State of Sarawak [P.U. (B) 91/2014]" (PDF). Attorney General's Chambers of Malaysia. 17 March 2014. "Federal Government Gazette - Results of Contested Election and Statement of the Poll after the Official Addition of Votes for the By-election of N.51 Balingian [P.U. (B) 114/2014]" (PDF). Attorney General's Chambers of Malaysia. 1 April 2014.
