= Wong Soon Koh =

Malaysian politician

Yang Berhormat Dato Sri Wong Soon Koh PNBS PGBK MLA
- 黄顺舸
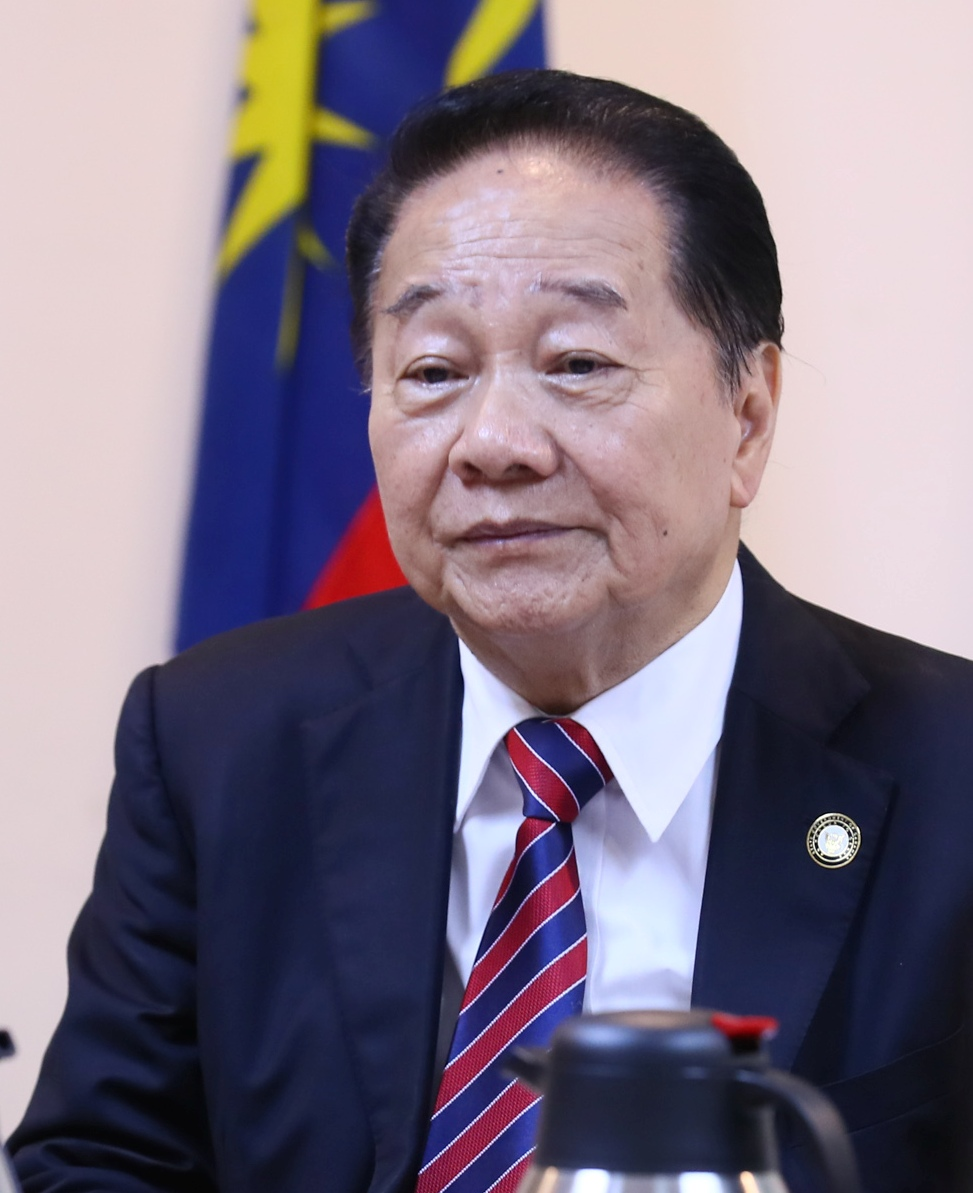
- Wong Soon Koh in 2018

State Leader of the Opposition of Sarawak
- In office 8 November 2020 – 19 March 2024
- Governor: Abdul Taib Mahmud (2020–2024); Wan Junaidi Tuanku Jaafar (January–March 2024)
- Premier: Abang Abdul Rahman Johari (2022–2024)
- Chief Minister: Abang Abdul Rahman Johari (2020–2022)
- Preceded by: Chong Chieng Jen
- Succeeded by: Chong Chieng Jen
- Constituency: Bawang Assan

State Minister of International Trade and E-Commerce of Sarawak
- In office 6 May 2017 – 15 July 2019
- Governor: Abdul Taib Mahmud
- Chief Minister: Abang Abdul Rahman Johari
- Deputy: Mohd Naroden Majais (E-Commerce)
- Preceded by: Position established
- Succeeded by: Awang Tengah Ali Hasan
- Constituency: Bawang Assan

State Minister of Finance II of Sarawak
- In office 2004 – 15 July 2019
- Governor: Abang Muhammad Salahuddin (2004–2014); Abdul Taib Mahmud (2014–2019)
- Chief Minister: Abdul Taib Mahmud (2004–2014); Adenan Satem (2014–2017); Abang Abdul Rahman Johari (2017–2019)
- Minister: Abdul Taib Mahmud (2004–2014); Adenan Satem (2014–2017); Abang Abdul Rahman Johari (2017–2019)
- Succeeded by: Douglas Uggah Embas
- Constituency: Bawang Assan

State Minister of Local Government and Community Development of Sarawak
- In office 28 September 2011 – 12 May 2016
- Governor: Abang Muhammad Salahuddin (2011–2014); Abdul Taib Mahmud (2014–2016)
- Chief Minister: Abdul Taib Mahmud (2011–2014); Adenan Satem (2014–2016)
- Deputy: Jerip Susil; Peter Nansian Ngusie; John Sikie Tayai
- Succeeded by: Sim Kui Hian
- Constituency: Bawang Assan

State Minister of Environment and Public Health of Sarawak
- In office 2008 – 27 September 2011
- Governor: Abang Muhammad Salahuddin
- Chief Minister: Abdul Taib Mahmud
- Succeeded by: Abdul Taib Mahmud (Environment)
- Constituency: Bawang Assan

Senior Vice President of the Progressive Democratic Party
- Incumbent
- Assumed office 6 April 2024 Serving with Penguang Manggil (Senior Vice President I) & Rolland Duat Jubin (Senior Vice President II)
- President: Tiong King Sing

1st President of the Parti Sarawak Bersatu
- In office 2015 – 19 March 2024
- Deputy: Jerip Susil; Johnical Rayong Ngipa
- Preceded by: Position established
- Succeeded by: Position abolished

Member of the Sarawak State Legislative Assembly for Bawang Assan
- Incumbent
- Assumed office 28 September 1991
- Preceded by: Position established
- Majority: 2,892 (1991); 2,709 (1996); 7,096 (2001); 2,504 (2006); 1,808 (2011); 4,131 (2016); 913 (2021)

Faction represented in Sarawak State Legislative Assembly
- 1991–2014: Barisan Nasional
- 2014: Sarawak People's Energy Party
- 2014–2016: United People's Party
- 2016–2018: Barisan Nasional
- 2018–2019: United Sarawak Party
- 2019–2024: Parti Sarawak Bersatu
- 2024–: Gabungan Parti Sarawak

Personal details
- Born: Wong Soon Koh; 16 May 1942 (age 84) Sibu, Japanese occupation of British Borneo (now Sarawak, Malaysia)
- Citizenship: Malaysian
- Party: Sarawak United Peoples' Party (SUPP); Parti Sarawak Bersatu (PSB) (2015–2024); Progressive Democratic Party (PDP) (since 2024)
- Other political affiliations: Gabungan Parti Sarawak (GPS) (since 2024)
- Spouse: Pauline Leong
- Children: Andrew Wong Kee Yew
- Education: University of Western Australia
- Occupation: Politician
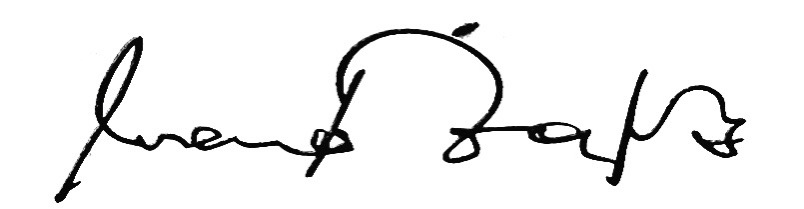
- Signature

Dato Sri Wong Soon Koh (simplified Chinese: 黄顺舸; traditional Chinese: 黃順舸; pinyin: Huáng shùngě; Jyutping: Wong4 Seon6 Go2; Pe̍h-ōe-jī: N̂g Sūn-ko; born 16 May 1942) is a Malaysian politician who has served as Member of the Sarawak State Legislative Assembly (MLA) for Bawang Assan since September 1991. He served as the State Leader of the Opposition of Sarawak from November 2020 to March 2024, State Minister of Finance II of Sarawak from 2004 and State Minister of International Trade and E-Commerce from May 2017 to his resignation in July 2019, State Minister of Local Government and Community Development from September 2011 to May 2016 and State Minister of Environment and Public Health from 2008 to September 2011. He is a member of the Progressive Democratic Party (PDP), a component party of the Gabungan Parti Sarawak (GPS) coalition. He was a member of the Parti Sarawak Bersatu (PSB) and the Sarawak United Peoples' Party (SUPP). He has also served as the Senior Vice President of PDP since April 2024. He also served as the 1st, founding and only President of PSB from 2015 to the dissolution of the party in March 2024.

== Education ==
Wong graduated from the University of Western Australia (UWA) in 1968 with a Bachelor of Arts.

== Political career ==
In September 2011, Wong was reappointed as Second Minister for Finance and reassigned as Minister for Local Government and Housing by Abdul Taib Mahmud.

In May 2014, Wong was sacked from Sarawak United Peoples' Party (SUPP), while still being SUPP Sibu branch chairman, by then-president Peter Chin Fah Kui. The party was reportedly unhappy with Wong's decision to appoint a number of community leaders. Shortly before he was officially sacked, Wong announced in a hurriedly called press conference that he was joining a newly formed party, Sarawak People's Energy Party (TERAS), together with former Sarawak Progressive Democratic Party (SPDP) president William Mawan Ikom. Less than three months later, Wong announced that he was leaving TERAS to form a new party, United Peoples' Party (UPP), bringing with him three other elected state assemblymen.

In May 2017, Wong was reassigned by the sixth Chief Minister of Sarawak Abang Abdul Rahman Johari Abang Openg to head the new Ministry of International Trade and E-Commerce as UPP still being pro-Barisan Nasional (BN) party.

In late 2018, Wong's party, UPP, announced that it was changing its name to United Sarawak Party (PSB). In July 2019, Wong tendered his resignation as the International Trade and e-Commerce Minister and second Minister of Finance from the state Cabinet, marking PSB turning its status into Independent.

== Personal life ==
Wong's spouse is Pauline Leong. Their only son Andrew Wong Kee Yew, was suspected to have died of a stroke on 10 February 2019 at their family home in Sibu. Andrew, former deputy chairman of Sibu Municipal Council, is married and has two children, a son and a daughter.

== Election results ==
Sarawak State Legislative Assembly
Year	Constituency	Candidate	Votes	Pct	Opponent(s)	Votes	Pct	Ballots cast	Majority	Turnout
1991	N39 Bawang Assan	Wong Soon Koh (SUPP)	6,112	65.50%	Ling Sie Ming (DAP)	3,220	34.50%	9,401	2,892	68.45%
1996	N41 Bawang Assan	Wong Soon Koh (SUPP)	6,953	62.10%	Chian Pao Koh (DAP)	4,244	37.90%	11,300	2,709	61.45%
2001	N41 Bawang Assan	Wong Soon Koh (SUPP)	9,465	79.98%	Michael Tiang Ming Tee (DAP)	2,369	20.02%	11,920	7,096	68.85%
2006	N47 Bawang Assan	Wong Soon Koh (SUPP)	6,804	61.28%	Wong Kee Woan (DAP)	4,300	38.72%	11,172	2,504	66.32%
2011	N47 Bawang Assan	Wong Soon Koh (SUPP)	7,316	57.05%	Alice Lau Kiong Yieng (DAP)	5,508	42.95%	12,936	1,808	77.26%
2016	N53 Bawang Assan	Wong Soon Koh (UPP)	9,015	61.12%	Stanley Chiew Sung Ngie (DAP)	4,884	33.38%	14,801	4,131	80.70%
2016	N53 Bawang Assan	Wong Soon Koh (UPP)	9,015	61.12%	Watson Bangau Johnathan Renang (IND)	569	3.89%	14,801	4,131	80.70%
2016	N53 Bawang Assan	Wong Soon Koh (UPP)	9,015	61.12%	Wong Sing Wei (STAR)	100	0.68%	14,801	4,131	80.70%
2016	N53 Bawang Assan	Wong Soon Koh (UPP)	9,015	61.12%	Yeu Bang Keng (IND)	63	0.43%	14,801	4,131	80.70%
2021	N53 Bawang Assan	Wong Soon Koh (PSB)	5,952	43.25%	Robert Lau (SUPP)	5,039	36.61%	13,763	913	70.18%
2021	N53 Bawang Assan	Wong Soon Koh (PSB)	5,952	43.25%	Amy Lau (DAP)	1,173	8.52%	13,763	913	70.18%
2021	N53 Bawang Assan	Wong Soon Koh (PSB)	5,952	43.25%	Michelle Ling Shyan Mih (PBK)	954	6.93%	13,763	913	70.18%
2021	N53 Bawang Assan	Wong Soon Koh (PSB)	5,952	43.25%	Ricky Enteri (IND)	645	4.69%	13,763	913	70.18%

Parliament of Malaysia
Year	Constituency	Candidate	Votes	Pct	Opponent(s)	Votes	Pct	Ballots cast	Majority	Turnout
2022	P212 Sibu	Wong Soon Koh (PSB)	11,128	16.88%	Oscar Ling Chai Yew (DAP)	31,287	47.45%	65,942	7,760	62.28%
2022	P212 Sibu	Wong Soon Koh (PSB)	11,128	16.88%	Clarence Ting Ing Horh (SUPP)	23,527	35.68%	65,942	7,760	62.28%

== Honours ==
- Sarawak
  - Member of the Order of the Star of Sarawak (ABS)
  - Commander of the Order of the Star of Hornbill Sarawak (PGBK) – Datuk (1994)
  - Knight Commander of the Order of the Star of Sarawak (PNBS) – Dato Sri (2003)

== See also ==
- Bawang Assan (state constituency)
- Parti Sarawak Bersatu
