= Sibu (federal constituency) =

Federal constituency of Sarawak, Malaysia

Sibu (P212)
Sarawak constituency

Federal constituency
- Legislature: Dewan Rakyat
- MP: Oscar Ling Chai Yew; PH
- Constituency created: 1977
- First contested: 1978
- Last contested: 2022

Demographics
- Population (2020): 141,574
- Electors (2022): 105,875
- Area (km²): 1,399
- Pop. density (per km²): 101.2

Sibu is a federal constituency in Sibu Division (Sibu District) and Mukah Division (Matu District), Sarawak, Malaysia, that has been represented in the Dewan Rakyat since 1978.

The federal constituency was created in the 1977 redistribution and is mandated to return a single member to the Dewan Rakyat under the first past the post voting system.

== Demographics ==
https://ge15.orientaldaily.com.my/seats/sarawak/p

Ethnic breakdown of Sibu's electorate as of 2022
1. Chinese (62.0%)
2. Sarawak bumiputera (22.6%)
3. Malay-Muslim bumiputera (14.7%)
4. Other ethnicities (0.70%)

As of 2020, Sibu has a population of 141,574 people.

Age breakdown of Sibu's electorate as of 2022
1. 18-20 (6.25%)
2. 21-29 (21.3%)
3. 30-39 (21.9%)
4. 40-49 (17.8%)
5. 50-59 (14.8%)
6. 60-69 (10.7%)
7. 70-79 (5.01%)
8. 80-89 (1.69%)
9. above 90 (0.53%)
Gender breakdown of Sibu's electorate as of 2022
1. Male (49.8%)
2. Female (50.2%)

== History ==
=== Polling districts ===
According to the gazette issued on 31 October 2022, the Sibu constituency has a total of 32 polling districts.

State constituency	Polling Districts	Code	Location
Bawang Assan (N53)	Rassau	212/53/01	SK Sg. Rassau; RH Limbang Sg. Sebedil; SK Ng. Tutus; SK Sg. Pasai; SK Sg. Pinang; SK Kpg. Bungan
Bawang Assan (N53)	Penasu	212/53/02	SK Rantau Panjang; SK Tanjung Penasu; SK Sg. Aup
Bawang Assan (N53)	Bawang Assan	212/53/03	SRDC Indoor Badminton Court Bawang Assan; RH Abell Bawang Assan; SK Tanjung Bekakap; SJK (C) Boi Ing Lebaan
Bawang Assan (N53)	Kunyit	212/53/04	SJK (C) Chau Su; SJK (C) Kai Nang
Bawang Assan (N53)	Ma'aw	212/53/05	SMJK Chung Cheng Sg. Ma'aw
Bawang Assan (N53)	Selalo	212/53/06	SK Kampong Banyok
Bawang Assan (N53)	Dassan	212/53/07	SJK (C) Do Nang; SMJK Kwong Hua Middle
Bawang Assan (N53)	Ensurai	212/53/08	SJK (C) Keng Nang
Bawang Assan (N53)	Lan	212/53/09	SJK (C) Ung Nang Bukit Lan
Bawang Assan (N53)	Engkilo	212/53/10	SJK (C) Ting Sing; SJK (C) Ing Guong
Bawang Assan (N53)	Lower Island	212/53/11	SJK (C) Chung Hua
Bawang Assan (N53)	Upper Island	212/53/12	SJK (C) Chung Hua
Bawang Assan (N53)	Tanah Mas	212/53/13	Tadika Chung Hua Lorong Padang
Pelawan (N54)	Rajang Park	212/54/01	Tadika Taman Rajang
Pelawan (N54)	Pelawan	212/54/02	SJK (C) Tung Hua
Pelawan (N54)	Sungai Merah	212/54/03	SMJK Tiong Hin
Pelawan (N54)	Disa	212/54/04	SJK (C) Tiong Hin
Pelawan (N54)	Sungai Antu	212/54/05	Kolej Vokesional Sibu
Pelawan (N54)	Gambir	212/54/06	SJK (C) Guong Ann; Tadika Sing Ang Tong; SK Jalan Deshon
Pelawan (N54)	Camar	212/54/07	SJK (C) Su Lai
Pelawan (N54)	Merdeka	212/54/08	SJK (C) Taman Rajang
Pelawan (N54)	Oya Lane	212/54/09	SMK Deshon
Pelawan (N54)	Indah	212/54/10	SMA Sibu
Pelawan (N54)	Nibong	212/54/11	SMK Kpg. Nangka
Nangka (N55)	Bandong	212/55/01	SK Pendidikan Khas Sibu
Nangka (N55)	Bahagia Jaya	212/55/02	SK Bahagia Jaya
Nangka (N55)	Datu Nyabor	212/55/03	SJK (C) Methodist Jln. Pulau
Nangka (N55)	Ilir Nangka	212/55/04	SK Perbandaran Sibu No.3
Nangka (N55)	Teku	212/55/05	SJK (C) Kiang Hin Teku; SJK (C) Guong Ming; SRA Sibu
Nangka (N55)	Seduan	212/55/06	SJK (C) Thian Chin; SK Ulu Sg. Merah; SJK (C) Nang Sang; SJK (C) Dung Sang; SMK Jalan Oya
Nangka (N55)	Tanggi	212/55/07	Agriculture Farmer Training Centre Batu 20 ¾ Jln. Oya
Nangka (N55)	Race Course	212/55/08	SK St. Mary

=== Representation history ===
Members of Parliament for Sibu
Parliament	No	Years	Member	Party	Vote Share
Constituency created, renamed from Bandar Sibu
5th	P144	1978-1982	Wong Soon Kai (黄顺开)	BN (SUPP)	13,525; 66.64%
6th	P144	1982-1986	Ling Sie Ming (林世铭)	DAP	14,432; 50.25%
7th	P167	1986-1990	Tiew Sung Seng (赵松胜)	BN (SUPP)	18,841; 50.32%
8th	P172	1990-1995	Robert Lau Hoi Chew (刘会洲)	BN (SUPP)	11,914; 54.20%
9th	P184	1995-1999	Robert Lau Hoi Chew (刘会洲)	BN (SUPP)	15,316; 57.31%
10th	P185	1999-2004	Robert Lau Hoi Chew (刘会洲)	BN (SUPP)	23,227; 62.25%
11th	P211	2004-2008	Robert Lau Hoi Chew (刘会洲)	BN (SUPP)	20,501; 54.43%
12th	P212	2008-2010	Robert Lau Hoi Chew (刘会洲)	BN (SUPP)	19,138; 53.38%
12th	P212	2010-2013	Wong Ho Leng (黄和联)	PR (DAP)	18,845; 50.22%
13th	P212	2013-2018	Oscar Ling Chai Yew (林财耀)	PR (DAP)	26,808; 52.59%
14th	P212	2018–2022	Oscar Ling Chai Yew (林财耀)	PH (DAP)	33,811; 59.58%
15th	P212	2022–present	Oscar Ling Chai Yew (林财耀)	PH (DAP)	31,287; 47.45%

=== State constituency ===
Parliamentary constituency	State constituency					
Parliamentary constituency	1969–1978	1978–1990	1990–1999	1999–2008	2008–2016	2016−present
Sibu			Bawang Assan			
Sibu		Maling				
Sibu				Nangka		
Sibu				Pelawan		
Sibu		Seduan				

=== Historical boundaries ===
State Constituency	Area				
State Constituency	1977	1987	1996	2005	2015
Bawang Assan		Bawang Assan; Ensurai; Kabang; Sungai Maaw; Tanjung Kunyit	Bawang Assan; Pasai Siong; Sungai Maaw; Sungai Rassau; Tanjung Penasu		
Maling	Bukit Assek; Li Hua; Maling; Salim; Sibu				
Nangka			Permai Jaya; Teku; Taman Desa Kemuyang; Taman Ding Lik Kong; Tanggi Spur		Nangka; Permai Jaya; Teku; Taman Ding Lik Kong; Tanggi Spur
Pelawan			Jalan Deshon; Jalan Pedada; Pelawan; Sibu; Sungai Merah	Jalan Pedada; Pelawan; Sibu; Sungai Antu; Sungai Merah	
Seduan	Kampung Hilir; Nangka; Permai Jaya; Sibu; Sungai Maaw	Permai Jaya; Sibu; Sungai Merah; Tanggi Spur; Teku			

=== Current state assembly members ===
No.	State Constituency	Member	Coalition (Party)
N53	Bawang Assan	Wong Soon Koh	GPS (PDP)
N54	Pelawan	Michael Tiang Ming Tee	GPS (SUPP)
N55	Nangka	Annuar Rapaee	GPS (PBB)

=== Local governments & postcodes ===
No.	State Constituency	Local Government	Postcode
N53	Bawang Assan	Matu & Daro District Council (Batang Igan area); Sibu Rural District Council	96000 Sibu; 96300 Dalat
N54	Pelawan	Sibu Municipal Council	96000 Sibu; 96300 Dalat
N55	Nangka	Sibu Municipal Council; Sibu Rural District Council (Permai Jaya and Tanggi areas)	96000 Sibu; 96300 Dalat

== Election results ==
Malaysian general election, 2022
Party	Candidate	Votes	%	∆%
DAP	Oscar Ling Chai Yew	31,287	47.45	▼12.13
GPS	Clarence Ting Ing Horh	23,527	35.68	▲35.68
PSB	Wong Soon Koh	11,128	16.88	▲16.88
Total valid votes		65,942	100.00	
Total rejected ballots		1,230		
Unreturned ballots		237		
Turnout		67,409	62.28	▼15.52
Registered electors		105,875		
Majority		7,760	11.77	▼8.36
DAP hold		Swing		
Source(s) https://lom.agc.gov.my/ilims/upload/portal/akta/outputp/1753265/PARLIMEN%20SARAWAK%20(PUB%20620).pdf

Malaysian general election, 2018
Party	Candidate	Votes	%	∆%
DAP	Oscar Ling Chai Yew	33,811	59.58	▲6.99
BN	Wong Kee Yew	22,389	39.45	▼7.56
PEACE	Tiew Yen Houng	377	0.66	▲0.66
STAR	Tiong Ing Tung	176	0.31	▲0.31
Total valid votes		56,753	100.00	
Total rejected ballots		515		
Unreturned ballots		421		
Turnout		57,689	77.80	▼2.06
Registered electors		74,149		
Majority		11,422	20.13	▲14.55
DAP hold		Swing		
Source(s) "His Majesty's Government Gazette - Notice of Contested Election, Parliament for the State of Sarawak [P.U. (B) 247/2018]" (PDF). Attorney General's Chambers of Malaysia. 3 May 2018. "Federal Government Gazette - Results of Contested Election and Statements of the Poll after the Official Addition of Votes, Parliamentary Constituencies for the State of Sarawak [P.U. (B) 321/2018]" (PDF). Attorney General's Chambers of Malaysia. 28 May 2018.

Malaysian general election, 2013
Party	Candidate	Votes	%	∆%
DAP	Oscar Ling Chai Yew	26,808	52.59	▲2.37
BN	Vincent Lau Lee Ming	23,967	47.01	▼2.15
Independent	Narawi Haron	203	0.40	▼0.22
Total valid votes		50,978	100.00	
Total rejected ballots		496		
Unreturned ballots		114		
Turnout		51,588	79.86	▲10.18
Registered electors		64,601		
Majority		2,841	5.58	▲4.52
DAP hold		Swing		
Source(s) "Federal Government Gazette - Notice of Contested Election, Parliament for the State of Sarawak [P.U. (B) 184/2013]" (PDF). Attorney General's Chambers of Malaysia. 26 April 2013. "Federal Government Gazette - Results of Contested Election and Statements of the Poll after the Official Addition of Votes, Parliamentary Constituencies for the State of Sarawak [P.U. (B) 225/2013]" (PDF). Attorney General's Chambers of Malaysia. 22 May 2013.

Malaysian general by-election, 16 May 2010 The by-election was called due to the death of incumbent, Robert Lau Hoi Chew.
Party	Candidate	Votes	%	∆%
DAP	Wong Ho Leng	18,845	50.22	▲5.86
BN	Robert Lau Hui Yew	18,447	49.16	▼4.22
Independent	Narawi Haron	232	0.62	▲0.62
Total valid votes		37,524	100.00	
Total rejected ballots		395		
Unreturned ballots		192		
Turnout		38,111	69.68	▲1.91
Registered electors		54,695		
Majority		398	1.06	▼7.96
DAP gain from BN		Swing		?
Source(s) "Pilihan Raya Kecil P.212 Sibu". Election Commission of Malaysia.

Malaysian general election, 2008
Party	Candidate	Votes	%	∆%
BN	Robert Lau Hoi Chew	19,138	53.38	▼1.05
DAP	Wong Ho Leng	15,903	44.36	▼1.21
PKR	Lim Chin Chuang	812	2.26	▲2.26
Total valid votes		35,853	100.00	
Total rejected ballots		334		
Unreturned ballots		192		
Turnout		36,379	67.77	▲4.95
Registered electors		53,679		
Majority		3,235	9.02	▲0.16
BN hold		Swing		

Malaysian general election, 2004
Party	Candidate	Votes	%	∆%
BN	Robert Lau Hoi Chew	20,501	54.43	▼7.82
DAP	Wong Ho Leng	17,161	45.57	▲7.82
Total valid votes		37,662	100.00	
Total rejected ballots		430		
Unreturned ballots		124		
Turnout		38,216	62.82	▼4.84
Registered electors		60,832		
Majority		3,340	8.86	▼15.64
BN hold		Swing		

Malaysian general election, 1999
Party	Candidate	Votes	%	∆%
BN	Robert Lau Hoi Chew	23,227	62.25	▲4.94
DAP	Wong Sing Nang	14,085	37.75	▼1.43
Total valid votes		37,312	100.00	
Total rejected ballots		453		
Unreturned ballots		756		
Turnout		38,521	67.66	▼1.70
Registered electors		56,931		
Majority		9,142	24.50	▲6.37
BN hold		Swing		

Malaysian general election, 1995
Party	Candidate	Votes	%	∆%
BN	Robert Lau Hoi Chew	15,317	57.31	▲3.11
DAP	Wong Ho Leng	10,472	39.18	▼5.88
Independent	Narawi Haron	937	3.51	▲3.51
Total valid votes		26,726	100.00	
Total rejected ballots		387		
Unreturned ballots		203		
Turnout		27,316	69.39	▲0.76
Registered electors		32,271		
Majority		4,845	18.13	▲8.99
BN hold		Swing		

Malaysian general election, 1990
Party	Candidate	Votes	%	∆%
BN	Robert Lau Hoi Chew	11,914	54.20	▲3.88
DAP	Ling Sie Ming	9,906	45.06	▼3.80
Sarawak United Labour Party	Tang Lung Chiew	162	0.74	▲0.74
Total valid votes		21,982	100.00	
Total rejected ballots		226		
Unreturned ballots		0		
Turnout		22,208	68.60	▼4.08
Registered electors		32,371		
Majority		2,008	9.14	▲7.68
BN hold		Swing		

Malaysian general election, 1986
Party	Candidate	Votes	%	∆%
BN	Tiew Sung Seng	18,841	50.32	▲0.57
DAP	Ling Sie Ming	18,295	48.86	▼1.39
Sarawak United Labour Party	Tang Lung Chiew	308	0.82	▲0.82
Total valid votes		37,444	100.00	
Total rejected ballots		294		
Unreturned ballots		0		
Turnout		37,738	72.68	▼1.46
Registered electors		51,925		
Majority		546	1.46	▲0.96
BN hold		Swing		

Malaysian general election, 1982
Party	Candidate	Votes	%	∆%
DAP	Ling Sie Ming	14,432	50.25	▲50.25
BN	Wong Soon Kai	14,291	49.75	▼16.89
Total valid votes		28,723	100.00	
Total rejected ballots		216		
Unreturned ballots		0		
Turnout		28,939	74.14	▲2.11
Registered electors		39,032		
Majority		141	0.50	▼32.78
DAP gain from BN		Swing		?

Malaysian general election, 1978
Party	Candidate	Votes	%
BN	Wong Soon Kai	13,525	66.64
Independent	Chieng Hie Kwong	6,772	33.36
Total valid votes		20,297	100.00
Total rejected ballots		244	
Unreturned ballots		0	
Turnout		20,541	72.03
Registered electors		28,519	
Majority		6,753	33.28
This was a new constituency created.
