= Bawang Assan =

State constituency in Sarawak, Malaysia

Bawang Assan (N53)
Sarawak constituency

State constituency
- Legislature: Sarawak State Legislative Assembly
MLA
Vacant
- Constituency created: 1987
- First contested: 1991
- Last contested: 2026

Bawang Assan is a state constituency in Sarawak, Malaysia, that has been represented in the Sarawak State Legislative Assembly since 1991.

The state constituency was created in the 1987 redistribution and is mandated to return a single member to the Sarawak State Legislative Assembly under the first past the post voting system.

== Demographics ==
Ethnic breakdown of Bawang Assan's electorate as of 2022
1. Chinese (46.9%)
2. Sarawak bumiputera (45.7%)
3. Malay-Muslim bumiputera (6.90%)
4. Other ethnicities (0.50%)

== History ==
As of 2020, Bawang Assan has a population of 26,642 people.

=== Polling districts ===
According to the gazette issued on 31 October 2022, the Bawang Assan constituency has a total of 13 polling districts.

State constituency	Polling Districts	Code	Location
Bawang Assan (N53)	Rassau	212/53/01	SK Sg. Rassau; RH Limbang Sg. Sebedil; SK Ng. Tutus; SK Sg. Pasai; SK Sg. Pinang; SK Kpg. Bungan
Bawang Assan (N53)	Penasu	212/53/02	SK Rantau Panjang; SK Tanjung Penasu; SK Sg. Aup
Bawang Assan (N53)	Bawang Assan	212/53/03	SRDC Indoor Badminton Court Bawang Assan; RH Abell Bawang Assan; SK Tanjung Bekakap; SJK (C) Boi Ing Lebaan
Bawang Assan (N53)	Kunyit	212/53/04	SJK (C) Chau Su; SJK (C) Kai Nang
Bawang Assan (N53)	Ma'aw	212/53/05	SMJK Chung Cheng Sg. Ma'aw
Bawang Assan (N53)	Selalo	212/53/06	SK Kampong Banyok
Bawang Assan (N53)	Dassan	212/53/07	SJK (C) Do Nang; SMJK Kwong Hua Middle
Bawang Assan (N53)	Ensurai	212/53/08	SJK (C) Keng Nang
Bawang Assan (N53)	Lan	212/53/09	SJK (C) Ung Nang Bukit Lan
Bawang Assan (N53)	Engkilo	212/53/10	SJK (C) Ting Sing; SJK (C) Ing Guong
Bawang Assan (N53)	Lower Island	212/53/11	SJK (C) Chung Hua
Bawang Assan (N53)	Upper Island	212/53/12	SJK (C) Chung Hua
Bawang Assan (N53)	Tanah Mas	212/53/13	Tadika Chung Hua Lorong Padang

=== Representation history ===
Members of the Legislative Assembly for Bawang Assan
Assembly	No	Years	Member	Party
Constituency created from Igan, Seduan and Matu-Daro
13th	N39	1991–1996	Wong Soon Koh (黄顺舸)	BN (SUPP)
14th	N41	1996–2001	Wong Soon Koh (黄顺舸)	BN (SUPP)
15th	N41	2001–2006	Wong Soon Koh (黄顺舸)	BN (SUPP)
16th	N47	2006–2011	Wong Soon Koh (黄顺舸)	BN (SUPP)
17th	N47	2011–2014	Wong Soon Koh (黄顺舸)	BN (SUPP)
17th	N47	2014	Wong Soon Koh (黄顺舸)	TERAS
17th	N47	2014–2016	Wong Soon Koh (黄顺舸)	UPP
18th	N53	2016–2018	Wong Soon Koh (黄顺舸)	BN (Direct)
18th	N53	2018-2021	Wong Soon Koh (黄顺舸)	PSB
19th	N53	2021–2024	Wong Soon Koh (黄顺舸)	PSB
19th	N53	2024 - 2026	Wong Soon Koh (黄顺舸)	GPS (PDP)

== Election results ==
Sarawak state election, 2026: Bawang Assan
Party	Candidate	Votes	%	∆%
GPS				▲
PH				▲
Total valid votes				
Total rejected ballots				
Unreturned ballots				
Turnout				
Registered electors				
Majority				

Sarawak state election, 2021: Bawang Assan
Party	Candidate	Votes	%	∆%
PSB	Wong Soon Koh	5,952	43.25	▲43.25
GPS	Robert Lau	5,039	36.61	▲36.61
DAP	Amy Lau	1,173	8.52	▼24.86
PBK	Michelle Ling Shyan Mih	954	6.93	▲6.93
Independent	Ricky Enteri	645	4.69	▲4.69
Total valid votes		13,763	100.00	
Total rejected ballots		166		
Unreturned ballots		23		
Turnout		13,952	71.00	▼9.70
Registered electors		19,650		
Majority		913	6.63	▼21.57
PSB gain from BN		Swing		?
Source(s) https://lom.agc.gov.my/ilims/upload/portal/akta/outputp/1718688/PUB687.pdf

Sarawak state election, 2016: Bawang Assan
Party	Candidate	Votes	%	∆%
BN	Wong Soon Koh	9,015	61.62	▲4.57
DAP	Stanley Chiew Sung Ngie	4,884	33.38	▼9.57
Independent	Watson Bangau Johnathan Renang	569	3.89	▲3.89
STAR	Wong Sing Wei	100	0.68	▲0.68
Independent	Yeu Bang Keng	63	0.43	▲0.43
Total valid votes		14,631	100.00	
Total rejected ballots		149		
Unreturned ballots		21		
Turnout		14,801	80.70	▲3.44
Registered electors		18,340		
Majority		4,131	28.24	▲14.14
BN hold		Swing		
Source(s) "Federal Government Gazette – Notice of Contested Election, State Legislative Assembly of the State of Sarawak [P.U. (B) 190/2016]" (PDF). Attorney General's Chambers of Malaysia. 25 April 2016. Archived from the original (PDF) on 12 June 2017. "Senarai Calon yang Disahkan Layak Bertanding Pilihan Raya Dewan Undangan Negeri ke-11". Election Commission of Malaysia. 25 April 2016. Archived from the original on 25 April 2016.

Sarawak state election, 2011: Bawang Assan
Party	Candidate	Votes	%	∆%
BN	Wong Soon Koh	7,316	57.05	▼4.23
DAP	Alice Lau Kiong Yieng	5,508	42.95	▲4.23
Total valid votes		12,824	100.00	
Total rejected ballots		106		
Unreturned ballots		6		
Turnout		12,936	77.26	▲10.94
Registered electors		16,743		
Majority		1,808	14.10	▼8.50
BN hold		Swing		
Source(s) "Federal Government Gazette – Results of Contested Election and Statements of the Poll after the Official Addition of Votes Sarawak [P.U. (B) 245/2011]" (PDF). Attorney General's Chambers of Malaysia. 29 April 2011.

Sarawak state election, 2006: Bawang Assan
Party	Candidate	Votes	%	∆%
BN	Wong Soon Koh	6,804	61.28	▼18.70
DAP	Wong Kee Woan	4,300	38.72	▲18.70
Total valid votes		11,104	100.00	
Total rejected ballots		68		
Unreturned ballots		0		
Turnout		11,172	66.32	▼2.53
Registered electors		16,844		
Majority		2,504	22.55	▼37.43
BN hold		Swing		

Sarawak state election, 2001: Bawang Assan
Party	Candidate	Votes	%	∆%
BN	Wong Soon Koh	9,465	79.98	▲17.88
DAP	Michael Tiang Ming Tee	2,369	20.02	▼17.88
Total valid votes		11,834	100.00	
Total rejected ballots		84		
Unreturned ballots		2		
Turnout		11,920	68.85	▲7.40
Registered electors		17,314		
Majority		7,096	59.98	▲35.88
BN hold		Swing		

Sarawak state election, 1996: Bawang Assan
Party	Candidate	Votes	%	∆%
BN	Wong Soon Koh	6,953	62.10	▼3.40
DAP	Chian Pao Koh	4,244	37.90	▲3.40
Total valid votes		11,197	100.00	
Total rejected ballots		98		
Unreturned ballots		5		
Turnout		11,300	61.45	▼7.00
Registered electors		18,388		
Majority		2,709	24.19	▼6.81
BN hold		Swing		

Sarawak state election, 1991: Bawang Assan
Party	Candidate	Votes	%
BN	Wong Soon Koh	6,112	65.50
DAP	Ling Sie Ming	3,220	34.50
Total valid votes		9,332	100.00
Total rejected ballots		61	
Unreturned ballots		8	
Turnout		9,401	68.45
Registered electors		13,734	
Majority		2,892	30.99
This was a new constituency created.
