= Robert Lau =

Malaysian politician

Yang Berbahagia Datuk Robert Lau PGBK
- 刘会洲
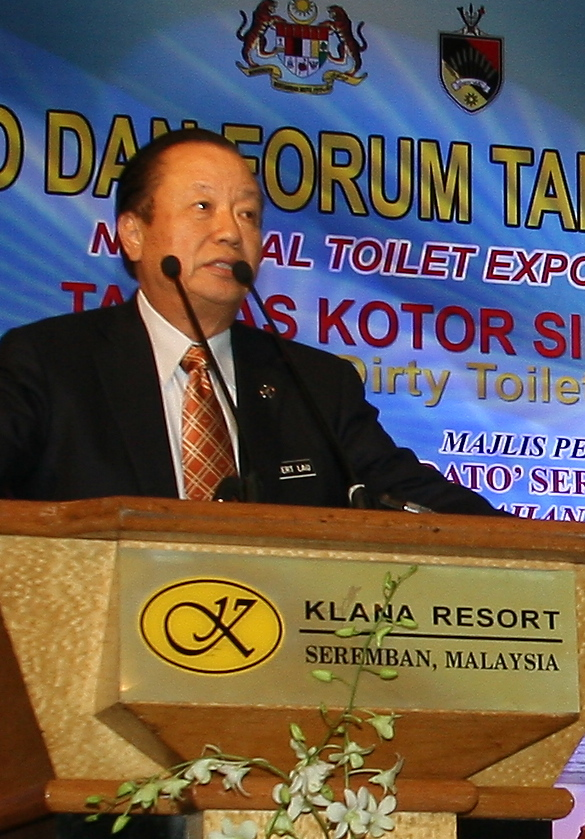

Deputy Minister of Transport
- In office 10 April 2009 – 9 April 2010 Serving with Abdul Rahim Bakri
- Monarch: Mizan Zainal Abidin
- Prime Minister: Najib Razak
- Minister: Ong Tee Keat
- Preceded by: Lajim Ukin
- Succeeded by: Jelaing Mersat
- Constituency: Sibu

Deputy Minister of Housing and Local Government
- In office 27 March 2004 – 9 April 2009 Serving with Azizah Mohd Dun (2004–2008); Hamzah Zainudin (2008–2009)
- Monarchs: Sirajuddin; Mizan Zainal Abidin
- Prime Minister: Abdullah Ahmad Badawi
- Minister: Ong Ka Ting (2004–2008); Ong Ka Chuan (2008–2009)
- Preceded by: Peter Chin Fah Kui
- Succeeded by: Lajim Ukin
- Constituency: Sibu

Chairman of Sibu Municipal Council
- In office April 1999 – 29 March 2004
- Preceded by: Kong Sien Han
- Succeeded by: Tiong Thai King

Member of the Malaysian Parliament for Sibu
- In office 21 October 1990 – 9 April 2010
- Preceded by: Tiew Sung Seng (BN–SUPP)
- Succeeded by: Wong Ho Leng (DAP)
- Majority: 2,008 (1990); 4,845 (1995); 9,142 (1999); 3,340 (2004); 3,235 (2008)

Personal details
- Born: 15 September 1942 Sibu, Japanese occupation of Sarawak (now Sarawak, Malaysia)
- Died: 9 April 2010 (aged 67) Kuala Lumpur, Malaysia
- Party: Sarawak United Peoples' Party (SUPP) (–2010)
- Other political affiliations: Barisan Nasional (BN) (–2010)
- Spouse: Janet Lau Ung Hie (刘文惠)
- Children: Alvin, Pierre and Tammy Lau; Tiffany Jane Ngu Ngee Hwong and Wong Siew Hung (adopted daughters)
- Occupation: Politician

Robert Lau Hoi Chiew (simplified Chinese: 刘会洲; traditional Chinese: 劉會洲; pinyin: Liú Huìzhōu; 15 September 1942 – 9 April 2010) was a Malaysian politician. He represented Sibu in the Parliament of Malaysia from 1990 until his death in 2010, and served as Deputy Minister of Transport from April 2009 until his death. Lau was also a vice-president of the Sarawak United Peoples' Party (SUPP).

== Background ==
Lau was born to a poor family and his mother died when he was three years old. He was schooled at St Michael's College, Adelaide and studied accountancy at the South Australia Institute of Technology (now the University of South Australia). In Australia he met his wife, Kapitan Dato' Janet Lau Ung Hie. He had three children with his wife; Alvin Lau Lee Ren (eldest son), Tammy Lau Lee Teng (daughter) and Pierre Lau Lee Wui (son).

His political career began in 1983 when he joined SUPP. He first contested a Parliamentary election in the 1990 Malaysian general election, winning the seat of Sibu against a Democratic Action Party candidate by a majority of 2,008 votes. He defended the seat in four further elections.

== Death ==
Lau died of bile duct cancer (cholangiocarcinoma) in his home in Kuala Lumpur on 9 April 2010. His remains arrived in Sibu at night on the same day. His funeral was held on 11 April 2010. The funeral began with a procession around the Sibu town and a requiem mass. His body was later buried at Nirvana Memorial Park.

== Election results ==
Parliament of Malaysia
Year	Constituency	Candidate	Votes	Pct	Opponent(s)	Votes	Pct	Ballots cast	Majority	Turnout
1990	P172 Sibu	Robert Lau Hoi Chiew (SUPP)	11,914	54.20%	Ling Sie Ming (DAP)	9,906	45.06%	22,208	2,008	68.60%
1990	P172 Sibu	Robert Lau Hoi Chiew (SUPP)	11,914	54.20%	Tang Lung Chiew (PLUS)	162	0.74%	22,208	2,008	68.60%
1995	P184 Sibu	Robert Lau Hoi Chiew (SUPP)	15,317	57.31%	Wong Ho Leng (DAP)	10,472	39.18%	27,316	4,845	69.39%
1995	P184 Sibu	Robert Lau Hoi Chiew (SUPP)	15,317	57.31%	Narawi Haron (IND)	937	3.51%	27,316	4,845	69.39%
1999	P185 Sibu	Robert Lau Hoi Chiew (SUPP)	23,227	62.25%	Wong Sing Nang (DAP)	14,085	37.75%	38,521	9,142	67.66%
2004	P211 Sibu	Robert Lau Hoi Chiew (SUPP)	20,501	54.43%	Wong Ho Leng (DAP)	17,161	45.57%	38,216	3,340	62.82%
2008	P212 Sibu	Robert Lau Hoi Chiew (SUPP)	19,138	53.38%	Wong Ho Leng (DAP)	15,903	44.36%	36,379	3,235	67.77%
2008	P212 Sibu	Robert Lau Hoi Chiew (SUPP)	19,138	53.38%	Lim Chin Chuang (PKR)	812	2.26%	36,379	3,235	67.77%

== Honours ==
- Sarawak
  - Commander of the Order of the Star of Hornbill Sarawak (PGBK) – Datuk (2002)
