= 2011 Sarawak state election =

Malaysian state legislative election

- 16 April 2011

All 71 seats in the Sarawak State Legislative Assembly 36 seats needed for a majority
- Turnout: 70%
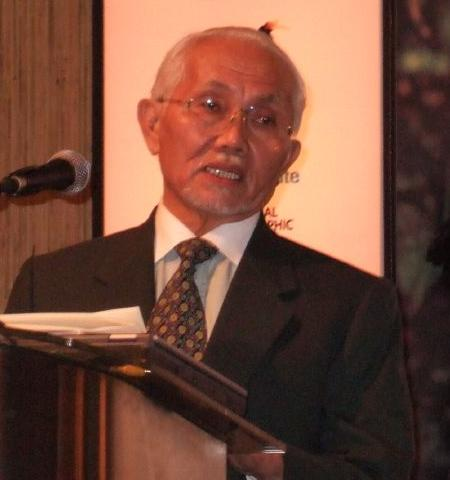

| | Majority party | Minority party |
|---|---|---|
| Leader | Abdul Taib Mahmud | Wong Ho Leng |
| Party | BN | DAP (PR (Note: As PR was not registered as political party, each component party competes as their own name and logo.)) |
| Leader since | 26 March 1981 | 18 April 2010 |
| Leader's seat | Balingian | Bukit Assek |
| Last election | 62 seats, 61.84% | 8 seats, 33.10% (Note: All the figures of votes and seats are a combined result of PKR, DAP, SNAP and PAS.) |
| Seats before | 63 | 7 |
| Seats won | 55 | 15 |
| Seat change | ▼8 | ▲8 |
| Popular vote | 372,379 | 277,329 |
| Percentage | 55.36% | 41.23% |
| Swing | ▼6.48% | ▲8.13% |
Chief Minister before election
Abdul Taib Mahmud
BN
Chief Minister-designate
Abdul Taib Mahmud
BN

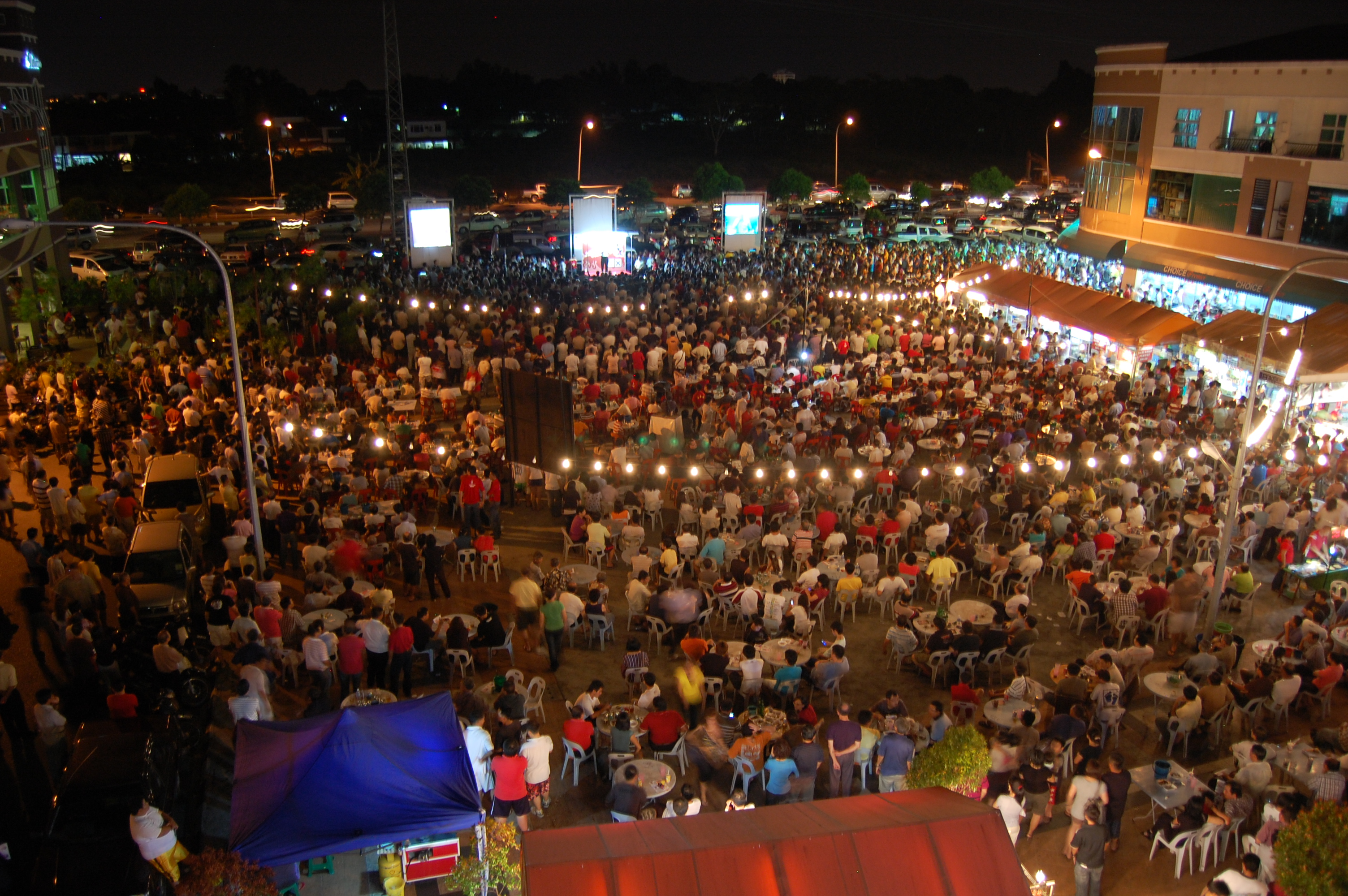
A political campaign on the first day of the campaigning period by the DAP in Kuching, Sarawak

The tenth Sarawak state election was held on Saturday, 16 April 2011 after nomination for candidates on Wednesday, 6 April 2011. The purpose of the election was to elect 71 representatives to the Sarawak State Assembly. The ninth state assembly was dissolved by Yang di-Pertua Negeri Sarawak, Tun Abang Muhammad Salahuddin Abang Barieng on the advice of Chief Minister Abdul Taib Mahmud on 21 March 2011. The previous state election in Sarawak was held in 2006.

The election resulted in Barisan Nasional (BN) retaining its two-thirds majority, albeit by a reduced margin. BN lost eight seats, mainly through the Sarawak United People's Party (SUPP). SUPP leader and deputy chief minister George Chan Hong Nam lost his seat. The opposition Pakatan Rakyat made gains, but fell short of its goal to deny a two-thirds majority for BN. The party with the single biggest gain on the day was the Democratic Action Party (DAP), which doubled its seats to 12.

Taib, who had served as Chief Minister for 30 years, was sworn in for his eighth term on the same night. Wong Ho Leng was reappointed as opposition leader after his party (DAP) won the most seats for the opposition bench. Before this, Baru Bian was being nominated as chief minister-in-waiting by Pakatan Rakyat.

== Background ==
Before the dissolution of Sarawak State Assembly, the Sarawak branch of the federal ruling coalition Barisan Nasional held 63 state seats, of which the Parti Pesaka Bumiputera Bersatu had 35 seats, Sarawak United People's Party 12 seats, Parti Rakyat Sarawak 8 seats and Sarawak Progressive Democratic Party 8 seats. The opposition parties held eight seats in total; the federal opposition coalition Pakatan Rakyat had seven seats (Democratic Action Party had six, and Parti Keadilan Rakyat had one), while the remaining one seat was held by Parti Cinta Malaysia.

This election has become the biggest in the state history, whereby 213 candidates are vying for 71 seats. Barisan Nasional fielded candidates for all 71 seats, of which Parti Pesaka Bumiputera Bersatu, is contesting 35 seats, followed by 19 for Sarawak United People's Party, 9 to the Parti Rakyat Sarawak and 8 to the Sarawak Progressive Democratic Party. Pakatan Rakyat which was formed without a chairman in April 2010, fielded candidates in 69 seats out of the 71 seats, of which 49 candidates were from Parti Keadilan Rakyat, 15 seats from Democratic Action Party and five seats from Pan-Malaysian Islamic Party. Sarawak National Party (SNAP), despite being a member of the Pakatan Raykat, fielded its own candidates in 27 constituencies after negotiations with Parti Keadilan Rakyat broke down. It has nevertheless announced that it will support Baru Bian, the Pakatan candidate for chief minister, if it wins any seats.

The election also marks the debut of the Parti Cinta Malaysia, which is not affiliated with Pakatan Rakyat or Barisan Nasional and is contesting in 6 seats. Another newcomer is Parti Ekonomi Rakyat Sarawak Bersatu (PERSB) (English: United Sarawak People's Economic Party) vying 16 seats. However PERSB were forced to contest as independent candidates as their party application has yet to be approved by Registrar of Societies (ROS) and during the nomination day, one of PERSB's candidate for N.58 Jepak was rejected by the Election Commission (EC).

== Timeline ==
| Date | Event |
|---|---|
| 21 March 2011 | Dissolution of the 16th Legislative Assembly |
| 23 March 2011 | Issue of the writs of election |
| 6 April 2011 | Nomination day |
| 6–15 April 2011 | Campaigning period |
| 13–15 April 2011 | Early voting for postal, overseas and advance voters |
| 16 April 2011 | Election day |

== Election issues ==
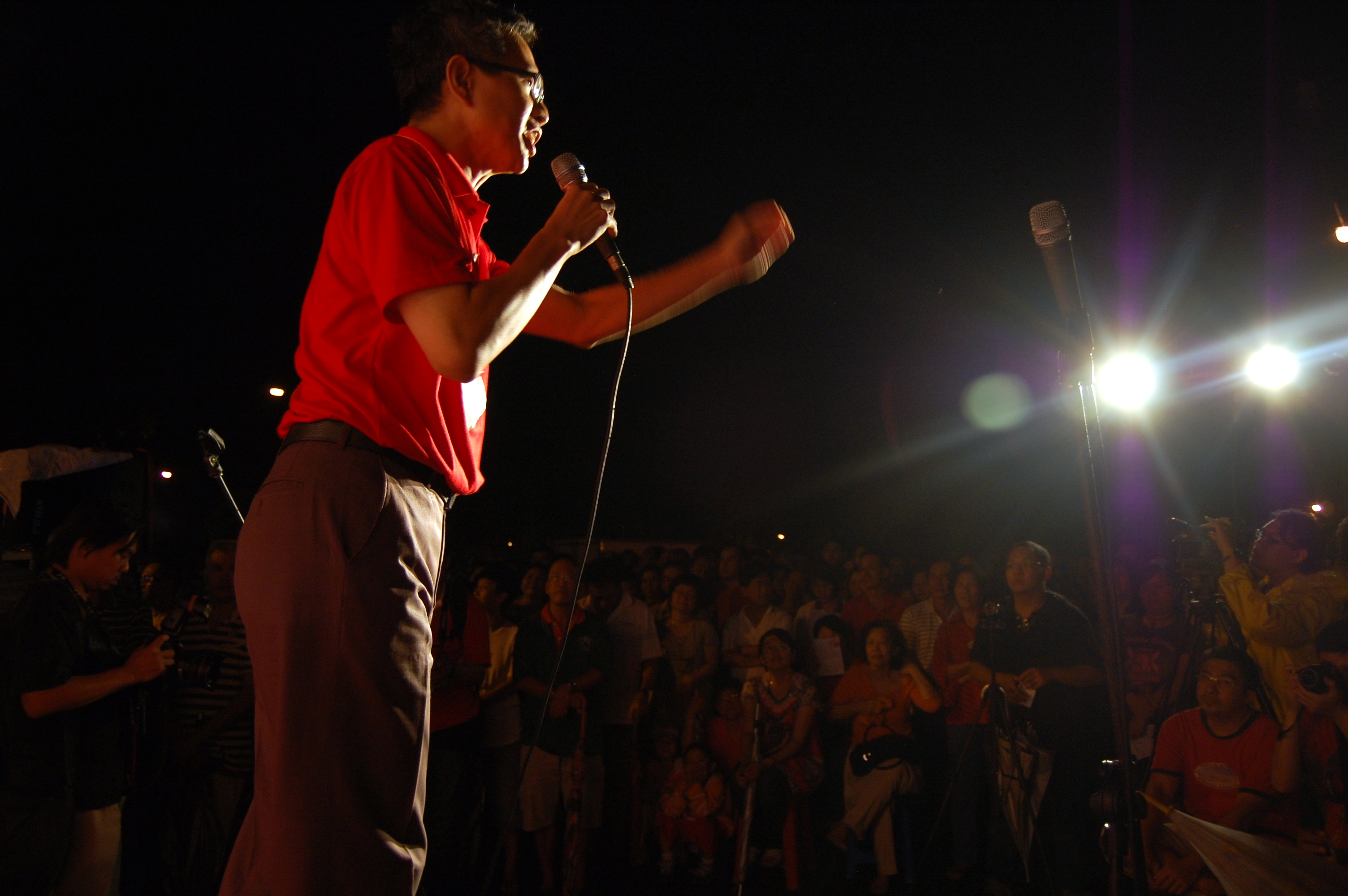
Member of Parliament Tony Pua of the DAP campaigning in Kuching

During the election, the opposition began painting the ruling Barisan Nasional coalition in a bad light by pointing to the impounding on Alkitab or Bahasa Malaysia bibles, saying that they were anti-Christian.

Another election issue that the opposition has brought up was regarding the long tenure of Chief Minister Taib Mahmud and his refusal to resign and appoint a successor. The issue went in hand with them pointing out his alleged amassing of a huge fortune while in office which has been revealed in numerous websites, especially the Sarawak Report. Other reasons include fuel hike, land lease issue, state government contracts, open tender, and Chinese language education non-dominant parties perceived as weak partner in the state government, and weak party organisation and publicity. On government contracts, many Chinese businessmen were increasingly concerned about the lack of transparency and accountability on the awarding of the contracts. Several large infrastructure projects were awarded without notice or an open tender.

== Results ==
A total of 18,363 eligible postal voters will be voting this time around in the Sarawak state election. Under Malaysian electoral law, teachers, military personnel, policemen and students based away from their constituencies are eligible to submit postal votes.

| Party or alliance | | Votes | % | Seats | +/– |
|---|---|---|---|---|---|
| Barisan Nasional | Parti Pesaka Bumiputera Bersatu | 192,785 | 28.66 | 35 | 0 |
| Barisan Nasional | Sarawak United Peoples' Party | 111,781 | 16.62 | 6 | –5 |
| Barisan Nasional | Parti Rakyat Sarawak | 35,120 | 5.22 | 8 | 0 |
| Barisan Nasional | Sarawak Progressive Democratic Party | 32,693 | 4.86 | 6 | –2 |
| Barisan Nasional | Total | 372,379 | 55.36 | 55 | –7 |
| Pakatan Rakyat | Democratic Action Party | 134,847 | 20.05 | 12 | +6 |
| Pakatan Rakyat | People's Justice Party | 117,100 | 17.41 | 3 | +2 |
| Pakatan Rakyat | Sarawak National Party | 15,663 | 2.33 | 0 | –1 |
| Pakatan Rakyat | Pan-Malaysian Islamic Party | 9,719 | 1.44 | 0 | 0 |
| Pakatan Rakyat | Total | 277,329 | 41.23 | 15 | +7 |
| Love Malaysia Party | | 2,895 | 0.43 | 0 | New |
| Independents | | 20,064 | 2.98 | 1 | 0 |
| Total | | 672,667 | 100.00 | 71 | 0 |
| Registered voters/turnout | | 979,796 | – | | |

Although analysts predicted that Barisan Nasional's fight to keep their two-thirds majority in the assembly would be close, they emerged with a relatively comfortable result, finishing the night with 55 seats, above the 47 needed for a two-thirds majority. Prime minister Najib Razak celebrated the victory as an indication that BN's support in Sarawak was still strong and noted that Pakatan Rakyat had failed to make major inroads into the state.

BN won the election on the back of uneven performances by its component parties. The Parti Pesaka Bumiputera Bersatu (PBB) led by Taib won all their seats contested, but the Sarawak United People's Party (SUPP) did poorly, with their leader, George Chan Hong Nam losing his seat as well. The SUPP suffered a net loss of five seats, all to the Democratic Action Party (DAP), the same number it lost during the previous election. It won six out of 19 seats contested.

The opposition parties also had differing performances in the election. The DAP won 12 out of 15 seats contested and made the biggest gain of the day with six additional seats, while the Parti Keadilan Rakyat (PKR) won only 3 seats out of 49 contested, gaining only two seats. PKR leaders still described the result as "historic" and a step towards a two-party system in the state. Meanwhile, the local Sarawak National Party (SNAP) and peninsula-based Pan-Malaysian Islamic Party (PAS) failed to win any seats with some candidates losing their deposits.

=== Results by constituency ===
| # | Constituency | Winner | Votes | Votes % | Opponent(s) | Votes | Votes % | Majority | Incumbent | Eligible voters | Voter turnout | Voter turnout % | Spoilt votes | Spoilt votes % |
|---|---|---|---|---|---|---|---|---|---|---|---|---|---|---|
| N01 | Opar | Ranum Mina (BN-SUPP) | 3,360 | 56.5% | Boniface Willy Tumek (PR-PKR) | 1,354 | 22.8% | 2,006 | Ranum Mina (BN-SUPP) | 8,099 | 5,950 | 73.5% | 68 | 1.1% |
| N01 | Opar | Ranum Mina (BN-SUPP) | 3,360 | 56.5% | Stephen Sagir (PR-SNAP) | 674 | 11.3% | 2,006 | Ranum Mina (BN-SUPP) | 8,099 | 5,950 | 73.5% | 68 | 1.1% |
| N01 | Opar | Ranum Mina (BN-SUPP) | 3,360 | 56.5% | Joseph Jindy Peter Rosen (IND) | 475 | 8.0% | 2,006 | Ranum Mina (BN-SUPP) | 8,099 | 5,950 | 73.5% | 68 | 1.1% |
| N02 | Tasik Biru | Peter Nansian Ngusie (BN-SPDP) | 5,829 | 55.2% | John Tenewi Nuek (PR-PKR) | 3,757 | 35.6% | 2,072 | Peter Nansian Ngusie (BN-SPDP) | 15,100 | 10,557 | 69.9% | 120 | 1.1% |
| N02 | Tasik Biru | Peter Nansian Ngusie (BN-SPDP) | 5,829 | 55.2% | Frankie Jurem Nyombui (PR-SNAP) | 825 | 7.8% | 2,072 | Peter Nansian Ngusie (BN-SPDP) | 15,100 | 10,557 | 69.9% | 120 | 1.1% |
| N03 | Tanjung Datu | Adenan Satem (BN-PBB) | 4,218 | 76.5% | Nani Sahari (PR-PAS) | 1,002 | 18.2% | 3,216 | Adenan Satem (BN-PBB) | 7,936 | 5,517 | 69.5% | 62 | 1.1% |
| N03 | Tanjung Datu | Adenan Satem (BN-PBB) | 4,218 | 76.5% | Gilbert Asson Kulong (IND) | 215 | 3.9% | 3,216 | Adenan Satem (BN-PBB) | 7,936 | 5,517 | 69.5% | 62 | 1.1% |
| N04 | Pantai Damai | Abdul Rahman Junaidi (BN-PBB) | 7,425 | 74.0% | Wan Zainal Abidin Wan Senusi (PR-PKR) | 2,354 | 23.5% | 5,071 | Abdul Rahman Junaidi (BN-PBB) | 14,104 | 10,038 | 71.2% | 105 | 1.1% |
| N04 | Pantai Damai | Abdul Rahman Junaidi (BN-PBB) | 7,425 | 74.0% | Suhaini Selamat (IND) | 111 | 1.1% | 5,071 | Abdul Rahman Junaidi (BN-PBB) | 14,104 | 10,038 | 71.2% | 105 | 1.1% |
| N05 | Demak Laut | Hazland Abang Hipni (BN-PBB) | 5,522 | 74.6% | Ali Hossen Abang (PR-PKR) | 1,770 | 23.9% | 3,752 | Abang Draup Zamahari Abang Zen (BN-PBB) | 10,437 | 7,403 | 70.9% | 98 | 1.3% |
| N06 | Tupong | Daud Abdul Rahman (BN-PBB) | 8,304 | 68.1% | Baharuddin @ Din Shah Mokhsen (PR-PKR) | 3,753 | 30.8% | 4,551 | Daud Abdul Rahman (BN-PBB) | 17,796 | 12,192 | 68.5% | 135 | 1.1% |
| N07 | Samariang | Sharifah Hasidah Sayeed Aman Ghazali (BN-PBB) | 8,008 | 74.4% | Zulrusdi Mohamad Hol (PR-PKR) | 2,577 | 23.9% | 5,431 | Sharifah Hasidah Sayeed Aman Ghazali (BN-PBB) | 15,942 | 10,769 | 67.6% | 144 | 1.3% |
| N08 | Satok | Abang Abdul Rahman Johari Abang Openg (BN-PBB) | 4,691 | 69.8% | Ahmad Nazib Johari (PR-PKR) | 1,891 | 28.2% | 2,800 | Abang Abdul Rahman Johari Abang Openg (BN-PBB) | 10,431 | 6,717 | 64.4% | 79 | 1.2% |
| N09 | Padungan | Wong King Wei (PR-DAP) | 11,957 | 72.2% | Sim Kiang Chiok (BN-SUPP) | 4,073 | 24.6% | 7,884 | Dominique Ng Kim Ho (PR-PKR) | 23,576 | 16,558 | 70.2% | 69 | 0.4% |
| N09 | Padungan | Wong King Wei (PR-DAP) | 11,957 | 72.2% | Dominique Ng Kim Ho (IND) | 439 | 2.7% | 7,884 | Dominique Ng Kim Ho (PR-PKR) | 23,576 | 16,558 | 70.2% | 69 | 0.4% |
| N10 | Pending | Violet Yong Wui Wui (PR-DAP) | 14,375 | 67.5% | Sim Kui Hian (BN-SUPP) | 6,780 | 31.8% | 7,595 | Violet Yong Wui Wui (PR-DAP) | 29,488 | 21,310 | 72.3% | 119 | 0.6% |
| N11 | Batu Lintang | See Chee How (PR-PKR) | 13,235 | 71.6% | Sih Hua Tong (BN-SUPP) | 4,854 | 26.3% | 8,381 | Voon Lee Shan (PR-DAP) | 27,833 | 18,475 | 66.4% | 61 | 0.3% |
| N11 | Batu Lintang | See Chee How (PR-PKR) | 13,235 | 71.6% | Soo Lina (IND) | 290 | 1.6% | 8,381 | Voon Lee Shan (PR-DAP) | 27,833 | 18,475 | 66.4% | 61 | 0.3% |
| N12 | Kota Sentosa | Chong Chieng Jen (PR-DAP) | 12,594 | 61.2% | Alfred Yap Chin Loi (BN-SUPP) | 7,770 | 37.7% | 4,824 | Chong Chieng Jen (PR-DAP) | 27,301 | 20,589 | 75.4% | 195 | 1.0% |
| N13 | Batu Kawa | Christina Chiew Wang See (PR-DAP) | 7,439 | 50.9% | Tan Joo Phoi (BN-SUPP) | 6,896 | 47.2% | 543 | Tan Joo Phoi (BN-SUPP) | 20,664 | 14,606 | 70.7% | 184 | 1.3% |
| N14 | Asajaya | Abdul Karim Rahman Hamzah (BN-PBB) | 7,597 | 69.8% | Arip Ameran (PR-PKR) | 3,108 | 28.6% | 4,489 | Abdul Karim Rahman Hamzah (BN-PBB) | 13,799 | 10,881 | 78.9% | 148 | 1.4% |
| N15 | Muara Tuang | Mohamad Ali Mahmud (BN-PBB) | 11,039 | 75.8% | Noraini Hamzah (PR-PAS) | 3,196 | 21.9% | 7,843 | Mohamad Ali Mahmud (BN-PBB) | 18,820 | 14,570 | 77.4% | 299 | 2.1% |
| N16 | Bengoh | Jerip Susil (BN-SUPP) | 8,093 | 54.6% | Willie Mongin (PR-PKR) | 4,447 | 30.0% | 3,646 | Jerip Susil (BN-SUPP) | 21,955 | 14,830 | 67.6% | 275 | 1.9% |
| N16 | Bengoh | Jerip Susil (BN-SUPP) | 8,093 | 54.6% | Wejok Tomik (IND) | 1,007 | 6.8% | 3,646 | Jerip Susil (BN-SUPP) | 21,955 | 14,830 | 67.6% | 275 | 1.9% |
| N16 | Bengoh | Jerip Susil (BN-SUPP) | 8,093 | 54.6% | Richard @ Peter Margaret (PR-SNAP) | 928 | 6.3% | 3,646 | Jerip Susil (BN-SUPP) | 21,955 | 14,830 | 67.6% | 275 | 1.9% |
| N17 | Tarat | Roland Sagah Wee Inn (BN-PBB) | 6,287 | 55.2% | Peter Ato Mayau (PR-PKR) | 4,292 | 37.7% | 1,995 | Roland Sagah Wee Inn (BN-PBB) | 16,352 | 11,382 | 69.6% | 209 | 1.8% |
| N17 | Tarat | Roland Sagah Wee Inn (BN-PBB) | 6,287 | 55.2% | Ateng Jeros (PR-SNAP) | 567 | 5.0% | 1,995 | Roland Sagah Wee Inn (BN-PBB) | 16,352 | 11,382 | 69.6% | 209 | 1.8% |
| N18 | Tebedu | Michael Manyin Jawong (BN-PBB) | 6,196 | 67.2% | Christoper Kiyui (PR-PKR) | 2,130 | 23.1% | 4,066 | Michael Manyin Jawong (BN-PBB) | 12,497 | 9,219 | 73.8% | 149 | 1.6% |
| N18 | Tebedu | Michael Manyin Jawong (BN-PBB) | 6,196 | 67.2% | Anthony Nais (PR-SNAP) | 468 | 5.1% | 4,066 | Michael Manyin Jawong (BN-PBB) | 12,497 | 9,219 | 73.8% | 149 | 1.6% |
| N18 | Tebedu | Michael Manyin Jawong (BN-PBB) | 6,196 | 67.2% | Kipli Ale (IND) | 260 | 2.8% | 4,066 | Michael Manyin Jawong (BN-PBB) | 12,497 | 9,219 | 73.8% | 149 | 1.6% |
| N19 | Kedup | Maclaine Ben @ Martin Ben (BN-PBB) | 6,476 | 53.4% | Lainus Andrew Luwak (PR-PKR) | 4,211 | 34.7% | 2,265 | Frederick Bayoi Manggie (BN-PBB) | 17,466 | 12,128 | 69.4% | 165 | 1.4% |
| N19 | Kedup | Maclaine Ben @ Martin Ben (BN-PBB) | 6,476 | 53.4% | Belayong Jawan (PR-SNAP) | 666 | 5.5% | 2,265 | Frederick Bayoi Manggie (BN-PBB) | 17,466 | 12,128 | 69.4% | 165 | 1.4% |
| N19 | Kedup | Maclaine Ben @ Martin Ben (BN-PBB) | 6,476 | 53.4% | Amin Banti (IND) | 397 | 3.3% | 2,265 | Frederick Bayoi Manggie (BN-PBB) | 17,466 | 12,128 | 69.4% | 165 | 1.4% |
| N20 | Sadong Jaya | Aidel Lariwoo (BN-PBB) | 4,008 | 71.7% | Abang Eddy Allyanni Abang Fauzi (PR-PAS) | 1,074 | 19.2% | 2,934 | Wan Abdul Wahab Wan Sanusi (BN-PBB) | 7,656 | 5,589 | 73.0% | 89 | 1.6% |
| N20 | Sadong Jaya | Aidel Lariwoo (BN-PBB) | 4,008 | 71.7% | Mahayudin Wahab (IND) | 402 | 7.2% | 2,934 | Wan Abdul Wahab Wan Sanusi (BN-PBB) | 7,656 | 5,589 | 73.0% | 89 | 1.6% |
| N21 | Simunjan | Naroden Majais (BN-PBB) | 5,495 | 74.2% | Mashor Hussen (PR-PKR) | 1,417 | 19.1% | 4,048 | Naroden Majais (BN-PBB) | 10,104 | 7,405 | 73.3% | 85 | 1.2% |
| N21 | Simunjan | Naroden Majais (BN-PBB) | 5,495 | 74.2% | Mac Palima Nyambil (PCM) | 237 | 3.2% | 4,048 | Naroden Majais (BN-PBB) | 10,104 | 7,405 | 73.3% | 85 | 1.2% |
| N21 | Simunjan | Naroden Majais (BN-PBB) | 5,495 | 74.2% | Zaini Le' (IND) | 179 | 2.4% | 4,048 | Naroden Majais (BN-PBB) | 10,104 | 7,405 | 73.3% | 85 | 1.2% |
| N22 | Sebuyau | Julaihi Narawi (BN-PBB) | 4,045 | 67.7% | Adam Ahid (PR-PAS) | 1,769 | 29.6% | 2,276 | Julaihi Narawi (BN-PBB) | 8,042 | 5,979 | 74.4% | 87 | 1.5% |
| N22 | Sebuyau | Julaihi Narawi (BN-PBB) | 4,045 | 67.7% | Ali Semsu (IND) | 67 | 1.1% | 2,276 | Julaihi Narawi (BN-PBB) | 8,042 | 5,979 | 74.4% | 87 | 1.5% |
| N23 | Lingga | Simoi Peri (BN-PBB) | 3,652 | 69.7% | Abg Ahmad Arabi Abg Bolhassan (PR-PKR) | 1,146 | 21.9% | 2,506 | Simoi Peri (BN-PBB) | 7,745 | 5,240 | 67.7% | 83 | 1.6% |
| N23 | Lingga | Simoi Peri (BN-PBB) | 3,652 | 69.7% | Abang Othman Abang Haji Gom (PR-SNAP) | 359 | 6.9% | 2,506 | Simoi Peri (BN-PBB) | 7,745 | 5,240 | 67.7% | 83 | 1.6% |
| N24 | Beting Maro | Razali Gapor (BN-PBB) | 3,069 | 52.8% | Abang Ahmad Kerdee Abang Masagus (PR-PAS) | 2,678 | 46.1% | 391 | Bolhassan Di (BN-PBB) | 7,868 | 5,808 | 73.8% | 61 | 1.1% |
| N25 | Balai Ringin | Snowdan Lawan (BN-PRS) | 4,145 | 63.3% | Ibi Uding (PR-PKR) | 1,260 | 19.3% | 2,885 | Snowdan Lawan (BN-PRS) | 8,798 | 6,544 | 74.4% | 110 | 1.7% |
| N25 | Balai Ringin | Snowdan Lawan (BN-PRS) | 4,145 | 63.3% | Dan Giang (PR-SNAP) | 765 | 11.7% | 2,885 | Snowdan Lawan (BN-PRS) | 8,798 | 6,544 | 74.4% | 110 | 1.7% |
| N25 | Balai Ringin | Snowdan Lawan (BN-PRS) | 4,145 | 63.3% | Lipeh Mawi (PCM) | 126 | 1.9% | 2,885 | Snowdan Lawan (BN-PRS) | 8,798 | 6,544 | 74.4% | 110 | 1.7% |
| N25 | Balai Ringin | Snowdan Lawan (BN-PRS) | 4,145 | 63.3% | Cobbold Lusoi (IND) | 85 | 1.3% | 2,885 | Snowdan Lawan (BN-PRS) | 8,798 | 6,544 | 74.4% | 110 | 1.7% |
| N25 | Balai Ringin | Snowdan Lawan (BN-PRS) | 4,145 | 63.3% | Sujal Gansi (IND) | 32 | 0.5% | 2,885 | Snowdan Lawan (BN-PRS) | 8,798 | 6,544 | 74.4% | 110 | 1.7% |
| N26 | Bukit Begunan | Mong Dagang (BN-PRS) | 3,671 | 67.1% | Jimmy Lim @ Jimmy Donald (PR-PKR) | 898 | 16.4% | 2,773 | Mong Dagang (BN-PRS) | 7,778 | 5,472 | 70.4% | 56 | 1.0% |
| N26 | Bukit Begunan | Mong Dagang (BN-PRS) | 3,671 | 67.1% | Ivanhoe Anthony Belon (PR-SNAP) | 638 | 11.7% | 2,773 | Mong Dagang (BN-PRS) | 7,778 | 5,472 | 70.4% | 56 | 1.0% |
| N26 | Bukit Begunan | Mong Dagang (BN-PRS) | 3,671 | 67.1% | Lias Julai (IND) | 188 | 3.4% | 2,773 | Mong Dagang (BN-PRS) | 7,778 | 5,472 | 70.4% | 56 | 1.0% |
| N27 | Simanggang | Francis Harden Hollis (BN-SUPP) | 4,758 | 66.4% | Leon Jimat Donald (PR-DAP) | 2,311 | 32.2% | 2,447 | Francis Harden Hollis (BN-SUPP) | 10,488 | 7,171 | 68.4% | 67 | 0.9% |
| N28 | Engkilili | Johnical Rayong Ngipa (BN-SUPP) | 4,928 | 71.2% | Marudi @ Barudi Anak Mawang (PR-PKR) | 1,121 | 16.2% | 3,807 | Johnical Rayong Ngipa (SNAP)* | 9,444 | 6,926 | 73.3% | 70 | 1.0% |
| N28 | Engkilili | Johnical Rayong Ngipa (BN-SUPP) | 4,928 | 71.2% | Jimmy Simon Maja (IND) | 414 | 6.0% | 3,807 | Johnical Rayong Ngipa (SNAP)* | 9,444 | 6,926 | 73.3% | 70 | 1.0% |
| N28 | Engkilili | Johnical Rayong Ngipa (BN-SUPP) | 4,928 | 71.2% | Semijie Janting (PR-SNAP) | 393 | 5.7% | 3,807 | Johnical Rayong Ngipa (SNAP)* | 9,444 | 6,926 | 73.3% | 70 | 1.0% |
| N29 | Batang Air | Malcom Mussen Lamoh (BN-PRS) | 4,460 | 71.0% | Nicholas Bawin Anggat (PR-PKR) | 1,719 | 27.4% | 2,741 | Malcolm Mussen Lamoh (BN-PRS) | 8,728 | 6,281 | 72.0% | 83 | 1.3% |
| N30 | Saribas | Ricky@Mohamad Razi Bin Sitam (BN-PBB) | 3,865 | 63.3% | Abang Zulkifli Abang Engkeh (PR-PKR) | 2,137 | 35.0% | 1,728 | Wahbi Junaidi (BN-PBB) | 8,054 | 6,107 | 75.8% | 76 | 1.2% |
| N31 | Layar | Alfred Jabu Numpang (BN-PBB) | 3,703 | 62.0% | Stanley Embat Pharoh Laja (PR-PKR) | 1,787 | 29.9% | 1,916 | Alfred Jabu Numpang (BN-PBB) | 8,109 | 5,977 | 73.7% | 91 | 1.5% |
| N31 | Layar | Alfred Jabu Numpang (BN-PBB) | 3,703 | 62.0% | Joe Unggang (PR-SNAP) | 183 | 3.1% | 1,916 | Alfred Jabu Numpang (BN-PBB) | 8,109 | 5,977 | 73.7% | 91 | 1.5% |
| N31 | Layar | Alfred Jabu Numpang (BN-PBB) | 3,703 | 62.0% | Ngumbang@Kibak Anak Datu (IND) | 170 | 2.8% | 1,916 | Alfred Jabu Numpang (BN-PBB) | 8,109 | 5,977 | 73.7% | 91 | 1.5% |
| N32 | Bukit Saban | Robert Lawson Chuat Vincent Entering (BN-PBB) | 3,899 | 67.7% | Jerah Anak Engkiong @ Edward Jerah (PR-PKR) | 1,125 | 19.5% | 2,774 | Vincent Entering (BN-PBB) | 7,657 | 5,761 | 75.2% | 78 | 1.4% |
| N32 | Bukit Saban | Robert Lawson Chuat Vincent Entering (BN-PBB) | 3,899 | 67.7% | Dayrell Walter Entrie (PR-SNAP) | 641 | 11.1% | 2,774 | Vincent Entering (BN-PBB) | 7,657 | 5,761 | 75.2% | 78 | 1.4% |
| N33 | Kalaka | Abdul Wahab Aziz (BN-PBB) | 6,865 | 67.3% | Ismail Hussein (IND) | 1,665 | 16.3% | 5,170 | Abdul Wahab Aziz (BN-PBB) | 14,167 | 10,202 | 72.0% | 120 | 1.2% |
| N33 | Kalaka | Abdul Wahab Aziz (BN-PBB) | 6,865 | 67.3% | Mohd Yahya Abdullah (PR-PKR) | 1,511 | 14.8% | 5,170 | Abdul Wahab Aziz (BN-PBB) | 14,167 | 10,202 | 72.0% | 120 | 1.2% |
| N34 | Krian | Ali Biju (PR-PKR) | 5,178 | 59.6% | Peter Nyarok Entrie (BN-SPDP) | 3,088 | 35.5% | 2,090 | Peter Nyarok Entrie (BN-SPDP) | 11,016 | 8,688 | 78.9% | 67 | 0.8% |
| N34 | Krian | Ali Biju (PR-PKR) | 5,178 | 59.6% | Liman Sujang (PR-SNAP) | 216 | 2.5% | 2,090 | Peter Nyarok Entrie (BN-SPDP) | 11,016 | 8,688 | 78.9% | 67 | 0.8% |
| N34 | Krian | Ali Biju (PR-PKR) | 5,178 | 59.6% | Banyi Beriak (IND) | 125 | 1.4% | 2,090 | Peter Nyarok Entrie (BN-SPDP) | 11,016 | 8,688 | 78.9% | 67 | 0.8% |
| N35 | Belawai | Haji Len Talif Salleh (BN-PBB) | 5,164 | 85.4% | Abdul Wahab Abdullah (PR-PKR) | 618 | 10.2% | 4,546 | Hamden Ahmad (BN-PBB) | 8,623 | 6,049 | 70.2% | 91 | 1.5% |
| N35 | Belawai | Haji Len Talif Salleh (BN-PBB) | 5,164 | 85.4% | Kiprawi Suhaili (IND) | 133 | 2.2% | 4,546 | Hamden Ahmad (BN-PBB) | 8,623 | 6,049 | 70.2% | 91 | 1.5% |
| N36 | Semop | Abdullah Saidol (BN-PBB) | 4,814 | 81.4% | Ong Chuang Siew (PR-PKR) | 564 | 9.5% | 4,250 | Mohamad Asfia Awang Nassar (BN-PBB) | 8,891 | 5,917 | 66.6% | 114 | 1.9% |
| N36 | Semop | Abdullah Saidol (BN-PBB) | 4,814 | 81.4% | Ajiji Fauzan (IND) | 419 | 7.1% | 4,250 | Mohamad Asfia Awang Nassar (BN-PBB) | 8,891 | 5,917 | 66.6% | 114 | 1.9% |
| N37 | Daro | Murni Suhaili (BN-PBB) | 3,867 | 73.4% | Mohamad Zamhari Berawi (IND) | 670 | 12.7% | 3,197 | Murni Suhaili (BN-PBB) | 7,305 | 5,265 | 72.1% | 105 | 2.0% |
| N37 | Daro | Murni Suhaili (BN-PBB) | 3,867 | 73.4% | Jamaludin Ibrahim (PR-PKR) | 475 | 9.0% | 3,197 | Murni Suhaili (BN-PBB) | 7,305 | 5,265 | 72.1% | 105 | 2.0% |
| N37 | Daro | Murni Suhaili (BN-PBB) | 3,867 | 73.4% | Noh @ Mohamad Noh Bakri @ Bakeri (IND) | 129 | 2.5% | 3,197 | Murni Suhaili (BN-PBB) | 7,305 | 5,265 | 72.1% | 105 | 2.0% |
| N38 | Jemoreng | Gani @ Abu Seman Jahwie (BN-PBB) | 4,505 | 71.6% | Abdul Hafiz Noh (IND) | 1,579 | 25.1% | 2,926 | Gani @ Abu Seman Jahwie (BN-PBB) | 8,635 | 6,295 | 72.9% | 120 | 1.9% |
| N38 | Jemoreng | Gani @ Abu Seman Jahwie (BN-PBB) | 4,505 | 71.6% | Asbor Abdullah (IND) | 77 | 1.2% | 2,926 | Gani @ Abu Seman Jahwie (BN-PBB) | 8,635 | 6,295 | 72.9% | 120 | 1.9% |
| N39 | Repok | Wong Hua Seh (PR-DAP) | 7,900 | 59.0% | David Teng Lung Chi (BN-SUPP) | 5,221 | 39.0% | 2,679 | David Teng Lung Chi (BN-SUPP) | 18,481 | 13,387 | 72.4% | 243 | 1.8% |
| N40 | Meradong | Ting Tze Fui (PR-DAP) | 6,884 | 61.4% | Ling Kie Kiong (BN-SUPP) | 4,197 | 37.5% | 2,687 | Ting Tze Fui (PR-DAP) | 15,337 | 11,205 | 73.1% | 107 | 1.0% |
| N41 | Pakan | William Mawan Ikom (BN-SPDP) | 3,938 | 58.0% | Jamal Bin Abdullah @ Tedong Anak Gunda (PR-SNAP) | 2,741 | 40.4% | 1,197 | William Mawan Ikom (BN-SPDP) | 9,274 | 6,785 | 73.2% | 83 | 1.2% |
| N42 | Meluan | Wong Judat (BN-SPDP) | 4,615 | 57.4% | John Brian Anthony Jeremy Guang (PR-PKR) | 2,973 | 37.0% | 1,642 | Wong Judat (BN-SPDP) | 11,487 | 8,041 | 70.0% | 119 | 1.5% |
| N42 | Meluan | Wong Judat (BN-SPDP) | 4,615 | 57.4% | Labang Jamba (PR-SNAP) | 312 | 3.9% | 1,642 | Wong Judat (BN-SPDP) | 11,487 | 8,041 | 70.0% | 119 | 1.5% |
| N43 | Ngemah | Alexander Vincent (BN-PRS) | 2,361 | 44.3% | Gabriel Adit Demong (PCM) | 1,366 | 25.6% | 995 | Gabriel Adit Demong (IND)** | 8,058 | 5,329 | 66.1% | 92 | 1.7% |
| N43 | Ngemah | Alexander Vincent (BN-PRS) | 2,361 | 44.3% | Aris Alap (PR-PKR) | 650 | 12.2% | 995 | Gabriel Adit Demong (IND)** | 8,058 | 5,329 | 66.1% | 92 | 1.7% |
| N43 | Ngemah | Alexander Vincent (BN-PRS) | 2,361 | 44.3% | Micheal Lias (PR-SNAP) | 577 | 10.8% | 995 | Gabriel Adit Demong (IND)** | 8,058 | 5,329 | 66.1% | 92 | 1.7% |
| N43 | Ngemah | Alexander Vincent (BN-PRS) | 2,361 | 44.3% | Yakup Khalid (IND) | 278 | 5.2% | 995 | Gabriel Adit Demong (IND)** | 8,058 | 5,329 | 66.1% | 92 | 1.7% |
| N44 | Machan | Gramong Juna (BN-PBB) | 3,683 | 53.4% | George Chen Nguk Fa (PR-PKR) | 2,054 | 29.8% | 1,629 | Gramong Juna (BN-PBB) | 9,944 | 6,895 | 69.3% | 109 | 1.6% |
| N44 | Machan | Gramong Juna (BN-PBB) | 3,683 | 53.4% | Kong Tat Kim (PCM) | 696 | 10.1% | 1,629 | Gramong Juna (BN-PBB) | 9,944 | 6,895 | 69.3% | 109 | 1.6% |
| N44 | Machan | Gramong Juna (BN-PBB) | 3,683 | 53.4% | Agustine Anak Liom @ August Kiom (PR-SNAP) | 338 | 4.9% | 1,629 | Gramong Juna (BN-PBB) | 9,944 | 6,895 | 69.3% | 109 | 1.6% |
| N45 | Bukit Assek | Wong Ho Leng (PR-DAP) | 13,527 | 73.0% | Chieng Buong Toon (BN-SUPP) | 4,700 | 25.4% | 8,827 | Wong Ho Leng (PR-DAP) | 26,926 | 18,518 | 68.8% | 97 | 0.5% |
| N45 | Bukit Assek | Wong Ho Leng (PR-DAP) | 13,527 | 73.0% | Hii Tiong Huat (IND) | 180 | 1.0% | 8,827 | Wong Ho Leng (PR-DAP) | 26,926 | 18,518 | 68.8% | 97 | 0.5% |
| N46 | Dudong | Yap Hoi Liong (PR-DAP) | 9,649 | 49.6% | Tiong Thai King (BN-SUPP) | 9,332 | 47.9% | 317 | Soon Choon Teck (BN-SUPP) | 26,251 | 19,470 | 74.2% | 211 | 1.1% |
| N46 | Dudong | Yap Hoi Liong (PR-DAP) | 9,649 | 49.6% | Apandi Abdul Rani (IND) | 174 | 0.9% | 317 | Soon Choon Teck (BN-SUPP) | 26,251 | 19,470 | 74.2% | 211 | 1.1% |
| N47 | Bawang Assan | Wong Soon Koh (BN-SUPP) | 7,316 | 56.6% | Alice Lau Kiong Yieng (PR-DAP) | 5,508 | 42.6% | 1,808 | Wong Soon Koh (BN-SUPP) | 16,743 | 12,936 | 77.3% | 106 | 0.8% |
| N48 | Pelawan | Wong Kee Woan (PR-DAP) | 13,318 | 65.4% | Vincent Goh Chung Siong (BN-SUPP) | 6,927 | 34.0% | 6,391 | Vincent Goh Chung Siong (BN-SUPP) | 28,808 | 20,379 | 70.7% | 91 | 0.5% |
| N49 | Nangka | Annuar Rapa'ee (BN-PBB) | 7,710 | 75.1% | Norisham Mohd Ali (PR-PKR) | 2,408 | 23.4% | 5,302 | Awang Bemee Awang Ali Basah (BN-PBB) | 14,197 | 10,270 | 72.3% | 152 | 1.5% |
| N50 | Dalat | Fatimah Abdullah (BN-PBB) | 6,288 | 77.9% | Sylvester Ajah Subah @ Ajah Bin Subah (PR-PKR) | 1,298 | 16.1% | 4,990 | Fatimah Abdullah (BN-PBB) | 11,857 | 8,069 | 68.1% | 195 | 2.4% |
| N50 | Dalat | Fatimah Abdullah (BN-PBB) | 6,288 | 77.9% | Salleh Mahali (IND) | 257 | 3.2% | 4,990 | Fatimah Abdullah (BN-PBB) | 11,857 | 8,069 | 68.1% | 195 | 2.4% |
| N51 | Balingian | Abdul Taib Mahmud (BN-PBB) | 6,210 | 75.0% | Salleh Jafaruddin (IND) | 1,056 | 12.8% | 5,154 | Abdul Taib Mahmud (BN-PBB) | 11,792 | 8,280 | 70.2% | 116 | 1.4% |
| N51 | Balingian | Abdul Taib Mahmud (BN-PBB) | 6,210 | 75.0% | Suriati Abdullah (PR-PKR) | 871 | 10.5% | 5,154 | Abdul Taib Mahmud (BN-PBB) | 11,792 | 8,280 | 70.2% | 116 | 1.4% |
| N52 | Tamin | Joseph Mauh Ikeh (BN-PRS) | 4,998 | 56.2% | Mengga Mikui (PR-PKR) | 3,706 | 41.7% | 1,292 | Joseph Mauh Ikeh (BN-PRS) | 12,244 | 8,895 | 72.7% | 181 | 2.0% |
| N53 | Kakus | John Sikie Tayai (BN-PRS) | 3,366 | 51.2% | Paul Anyie Raja (PR-PKR) | 2,764 | 42.0% | 602 | John Sikie Tayai (BN-PRS) | 9,604 | 6,574 | 68.5% | 105 | 1.6% |
| N53 | Kakus | John Sikie Tayai (BN-PRS) | 3,366 | 51.2% | Dick @ Laurence Dick Sekalai (PCM) | 186 | 2.8% | 602 | John Sikie Tayai (BN-PRS) | 9,604 | 6,574 | 68.5% | 105 | 1.6% |
| N53 | Kakus | John Sikie Tayai (BN-PRS) | 3,366 | 51.2% | Entali Empin (IND) | 141 | 2.1% | 602 | John Sikie Tayai (BN-PRS) | 9,604 | 6,574 | 68.5% | 105 | 1.6% |
| N54 | Pelagus | George Lagong (IND) | 5,740 | 57.3% | Stanley Nyitar @ Unja Malang (BN-PRS) | 2,903 | 29.0% | 2,837 | Larry Sng Wei Shien (BN-PRS) | 15,322 | 10,014 | 65.4% | 172 | 1.7% |
| N54 | Pelagus | George Lagong (IND) | 5,740 | 57.3% | Edward Sumbang Asun (PR-PKR) | 1,171 | 11.7% | 2,837 | Larry Sng Wei Shien (BN-PRS) | 15,322 | 10,014 | 65.4% | 172 | 1.7% |
| N55 | Katibas | Ambrose Blikau Enturan (BN-PBB) | 3,326 | 61.6% | Munan Laja (PR-PKR) | 1,070 | 19.8% | 2,256 | Ambrose Blikau Enturan (BN-PBB) | 8,542 | 5,397 | 63.2% | 85 | 1.6% |
| N55 | Katibas | Ambrose Blikau Enturan (BN-PBB) | 3,326 | 61.6% | Toh Heng San (PR-SNAP) | 897 | 16.6% | 2,256 | Ambrose Blikau Enturan (BN-PBB) | 8,542 | 5,397 | 63.2% | 85 | 1.6% |
| N56 | Baleh | James Jemut Masing (BN-PRS) | 5,452 | 81.6% | Bedindang Manjah (PR-PKR) | 1,334 | 20.0% | 3,898 | James Jemut Masing (BN-PRS) | 11,287 | 6,684 | 59.2% | 98 | 1.5% |
| N57 | Belaga | Liwan Lagang (BN-PRS) | 3,974 | 67.2% | Basah Kesing @ Ali Basah Kesing (PR-PKR) | 1,046 | 17.7% | 2,928 | Liwan Lagang (BN-PRS) | 8,463 | 5,913 | 69.9% | 74 | 1.3% |
| N57 | Belaga | Liwan Lagang (BN-PRS) | 3,974 | 67.2% | John Bampa (PR-SNAP) | 368 | 6.2% | 2,928 | Liwan Lagang (BN-PRS) | 8,463 | 5,913 | 69.9% | 74 | 1.3% |
| N57 | Belaga | Liwan Lagang (BN-PRS) | 3,974 | 67.2% | Kenneth Adan Silek (IND) | 330 | 5.6% | 2,928 | Liwan Lagang (BN-PRS) | 8,463 | 5,913 | 69.9% | 74 | 1.3% |
| N57 | Belaga | Liwan Lagang (BN-PRS) | 3,974 | 67.2% | Micheal Jok (IND) | 94 | 1.6% | 2,928 | Liwan Lagang (BN-PRS) | 8,463 | 5,913 | 69.9% | 74 | 1.3% |
| N57 | Belaga | Liwan Lagang (BN-PRS) | 3,974 | 67.2% | Mathew Munan (IND) | 27 | 0.5% | 2,928 | Liwan Lagang (BN-PRS) | 8,463 | 5,913 | 69.9% | 74 | 1.3% |
| N58 | Jepak | Talip Zulpilip (BN-PBB) | 5,470 | 60.8% | Abdul Jalil Bujang (PR-PKR) | 2,342 | 26.0% | 3,128 | Talip Zulpilip (BN-PBB) | 12,979 | 9,002 | 69.4% | 133 | 1.5% |
| N58 | Jepak | Talip Zulpilip (BN-PBB) | 5,470 | 60.8% | Abdul Kuddus Ramlee (IND) | 477 | 5.3% | 3,128 | Talip Zulpilip (BN-PBB) | 12,979 | 9,002 | 69.4% | 133 | 1.5% |
| N58 | Jepak | Talip Zulpilip (BN-PBB) | 5,470 | 60.8% | Ramli Malaka (PR-SNAP) | 433 | 4.8% | 3,128 | Talip Zulpilip (BN-PBB) | 12,979 | 9,002 | 69.4% | 133 | 1.5% |
| N58 | Jepak | Talip Zulpilip (BN-PBB) | 5,470 | 60.8% | Awang Abdillah Awang Nassar (IND) | 89 | 1.0% | 3,128 | Talip Zulpilip (BN-PBB) | 12,979 | 9,002 | 69.4% | 133 | 1.5% |
| N59 | Kidurong | Chiew Chiu Sing (PR-DAP) | 12,493 | 68.2% | Henry Ling Kuong Meng (BN-SUPP) | 5,563 | 30.4% | 6,930 | Chiew Chiu Sing (PR-DAP) | 27,225 | 18,322 | 67.3% | 144 | 0.8% |
| N60 | Kemena | Stephen Rundi Utom (BN-PBB) | 6,369 | 63.4% | Bernard Binar Rading (PR-PKR) | 3,020 | 30.1% | 3,349 | Stephen Rundi Utom (BN-PBB) | 14,082 | 10,039 | 71.3% | 162 | 1.6% |
| N60 | Kemena | Stephen Rundi Utom (BN-PBB) | 6,369 | 63.4% | Unggun Bayang (PR-SNAP) | 285 | 2.8% | 3,349 | Stephen Rundi Utom (BN-PBB) | 14,082 | 10,039 | 71.3% | 162 | 1.6% |
| N60 | Kemena | Stephen Rundi Utom (BN-PBB) | 6,369 | 63.4% | Liam Rengga (IND) | 197 | 2.0% | 3,349 | Stephen Rundi Utom (BN-PBB) | 14,082 | 10,039 | 71.3% | 162 | 1.6% |
| N61 | Bekenu | Rosey Yunus (BN-SPDP) | 4,946 | 69.3% | Ishak Mahwi (PR-PKR) | 1,232 | 17.3% | 3,714 | Rosey Yunus (BN-SPDP) | 10,672 | 7,135 | 66.9% | 103 | 1.4% |
| N61 | Bekenu | Rosey Yunus (BN-SPDP) | 4,946 | 69.3% | Thony Badak (PR-SNAP) | 570 | 8.0% | 3,714 | Rosey Yunus (BN-SPDP) | 10,672 | 7,135 | 66.9% | 103 | 1.4% |
| N61 | Bekenu | Rosey Yunus (BN-SPDP) | 4,946 | 69.3% | Dayang Juliana Awang Tambi (PCM) | 284 | 4.0% | 3,714 | Rosey Yunus (BN-SPDP) | 10,672 | 7,135 | 66.9% | 103 | 1.4% |
| N62 | Lambir | Ripin Lamat (BN-PBB) | 4,625 | 53.9% | Zulhaidah Suboh (PR-PKR) | 3,104 | 36.1% | 1,521 | Swin Jemaah @ Aidan Wing (BN-PBB) | 14,144 | 8,588 | 60.7% | 143 | 1.7% |
| N62 | Lambir | Ripin Lamat (BN-PBB) | 4,625 | 53.9% | Johari Bujang (PR-SNAP) | 693 | 8.1% | 1,521 | Swin Jemaah @ Aidan Wing (BN-PBB) | 14,144 | 8,588 | 60.7% | 143 | 1.7% |
| N63 | Piasau | Alan Ling Sie Kiong (PR-DAP) | 5,598 | 53.4% | George Chan Hong Nam (BN-SUPP) | 4,408 | 42.1% | 1,190 | George Chan Hong Nam (BN-SUPP) | 16,600 | 10,479 | 63.1% | 73 | 0.7% |
| N64 | Pujut | Fong Pau Teck (PR-DAP) | 9,120 | 62.9% | Andy Chia Chu Fatt (BN-SUPP) | 5,271 | 36.4% | 3,849 | Andy Chia Chu Fatt (BN-SUPP) | 22,577 | 14,488 | 64.2% | 67 | 0.5% |
| N65 | Senadin | Lee Kim Shin (BN-SUPP) | 7,334 | 49.5% | Michael Teo Yu Keng (PR-PKR) | 7,276 | 49.1% | 58 | Lee Kim Shin (BN-SUPP) | 22,432 | 14,816 | 66.1% | 186 | 1.3% |
| N66 | Marudi | Sylvester Entri Muran (BN-SPDP) | 4,578 | 71.1% | Gerang Dagom (PR-PKR) | 1,376 | 21.4% | 3,202 | Sylvester Entri Muran (BN-SPDP) | 13,093 | 6,443 | 49.2% | 86 | 1.3% |
| N66 | Marudi | Sylvester Entri Muran (BN-SPDP) | 4,578 | 71.1% | Edwin Dundang Bugak (PR-SNAP) | 281 | 4.4% | 3,202 | Sylvester Entri Muran (BN-SPDP) | 13,093 | 6,443 | 49.2% | 86 | 1.3% |
| N66 | Marudi | Sylvester Entri Muran (BN-SPDP) | 4,578 | 71.1% | Micheal Ding Tuah (IND) | 122 | 1.9% | 3,202 | Sylvester Entri Muran (BN-SPDP) | 13,093 | 6,443 | 49.2% | 86 | 1.3% |
| N67 | Telang Usan | Dennis Ngau (BN-PBB) | 3,597 | 46.2% | Harrison Ngau Laing (PR-PKR) | 2,752 | 35.4% | 845 | Lihan Jok (BN-PBB) | 13,623 | 7,785 | 57.2% | 86 | 1.1% |
| N67 | Telang Usan | Dennis Ngau (BN-PBB) | 3,597 | 46.2% | Kebing Wan (PR-SNAP) | 705 | 9.1% | 845 | Lihan Jok (BN-PBB) | 13,623 | 7,785 | 57.2% | 86 | 1.1% |
| N67 | Telang Usan | Dennis Ngau (BN-PBB) | 3,597 | 46.2% | Jok Ding (IND) | 623 | 8.0% | 845 | Lihan Jok (BN-PBB) | 13,623 | 7,785 | 57.2% | 86 | 1.1% |
| N68 | Bukit Kota | Abdul Rahman Ismail (BN-PBB) | 6,835 | 72.2% | Leong Kwang Yew (PR-DAP) | 1,774 | 18.7% | 5,061 | Abdul Rahman Ismail (BN-PBB) | 14,471 | 9,470 | 65.4% | 65 | 0.7% |
| N68 | Bukit Kota | Abdul Rahman Ismail (BN-PBB) | 6,835 | 72.2% | Usop Jidin (IND) | 398 | 4.2% | 5,061 | Abdul Rahman Ismail (BN-PBB) | 14,471 | 9,470 | 65.4% | 65 | 0.7% |
| N68 | Bukit Kota | Abdul Rahman Ismail (BN-PBB) | 6,835 | 72.2% | Ladis Pandin (IND) | 353 | 3.7% | 5,061 | Abdul Rahman Ismail (BN-PBB) | 14,471 | 9,470 | 65.4% | 65 | 0.7% |
| N69 | Batu Danau | Palu @ Paulus Gumbang (BN-SPDP) | 3,667 | 70.2% | Lau Liak Koi (PR-PKR) | 1,348 | 25.8% | 2,319 | Palu @ Paulus Gumbang (BN-SPDP) | 7,636 | 5,227 | 68.5% | 72 | 1.4% |
| N69 | Batu Danau | Palu @ Paulus Gumbang (BN-SPDP) | 3,667 | 70.2% | Lawrence Cosmas Sunan Anak Simpang (PR-SNAP) | 140 | 2.7% | 2,319 | Palu @ Paulus Gumbang (BN-SPDP) | 7,636 | 5,227 | 68.5% | 72 | 1.4% |
| N70 | Ba'kelalan | Baru Bian (PR-PKR) | 2,505 | 54.6% | Willie Liau (BN-SPDP) | 2,032 | 44.3% | 473 | Nelson Balang Ringin (BN-SPDP) | 6,958 | 4,585 | 65.9% | 37 | 0.8% |
| N71 | Bukit Sari | Awang Tengah Ali Hasan (BN-PBB) | 6,018 | 85.2% | Japar Suyut (PR-PKR) | 955 | 13.5% | 5,063 | Awang Tengah Ali Hassan (BN-PBB) | 9,983 | 7,067 | 70.8% | 94 | 1.3% |

^{*}Dr Johnichal Rayong, who won the N28 Engkilili seat on SNAP ticket, joined SUPP in December 2010, contributed another seat for BN.

^{**}Gabriel Adit Demong previously an independent for N43 Ngemah constituency joined PKR in November 2008. He later quit PKR and joined Parti Cinta Malaysia in December 2009.

^{***}AMENDMENTS TO THE EXISTING NAMES OF STATE CONSTITUENCIES: N19 Mambong (Origin N16 Bengoh), N34 Batang Ai (Origin N29 Batang Air), N41 Kuala Rajang (Origin N35 Belawai), N68 Tanjong Batu (Origin N59 Kidurong)

== Aftermath ==
As the DAP remained the largest opposition party in the assembly, its state chief Wong Ho Leng kept his position as state opposition leader. However Ho Leng died in 2014 due to cancer; no by-elections were held as his death were less than 2 years until the expiry of the State Assembly. The position of opposition leader were already handed over to new DAP state leader Chong Chieng Jen in 2013, as Ho Leng stepped away from active duty from party and state assembly while he were battling cancer.

Meanwhile, PKR decided to petition the Elections Court to declare the Senadin contest null and void, citing irregularities during the polling process. SUPP candidate Lee Kim Shin beat PKR's Michael Teo in the contest by 58 votes. Election observers have alleged abuse of postal votes in the constituency by authorities to help Lee win.

This election is the only time the DAP-PAS-PKR-SNAP coalition is referred as Pakatan Rakyat during the Sarawak state election campaign (although each party is contesting using their own name and logo). In 2015, the PR coalition was disbanded, due to disagreements between PAS and DAP over the former's insistence to implement the Islamic penal code, known as hudud, in the State of Kelantan. As PAS and SNAP has no representation in the Sarawak state assembly, the split does not affect the opposition as only PKR and DAP (who later forms a new alliance Pakatan Harapan in 2016) formed the opposition bloc.

This was the final election Abdul Taib participated; he would resign his state seat, position as state's Chief Minister and PBB party president, in 2014 when he were installed as the state's Yang Di-Pertua Negeri (Governor). Adenan Satem, the PBB deputy president, would succeed him as Chief Minister and party president. The 2014 Balingian by-election, necessitated by Taib's resignation of the seat, was won by another PBB candidate, Yussibnosh Balo.
