= Wong Ho Leng =

Malaysian politician

- 黄和联

State Leader of Opposition of the Sarawak State Legislative Assembly
- In office 23 May 2006 – 10 June 2013
- Preceded by: Post created
- Succeeded by: Chong Chieng Jen

State Chairman of the Democratic Action Party of Sarawak
- In office February 2001 – 10 June 2013
- Preceded by: Jason Wong Sing Nang
- Succeeded by: Chong Chieng Jen

Member of the Malaysian Parliament for Sibu
- In office 16 May 2010 – 5 May 2013
- Preceded by: Robert Lau Hoi Chew (SUPP-BN)
- Succeeded by: Oscar Ling Chai Yew (DAP-PR)
- Majority: 398 (2010)

Member of the Sarawak State Assembly for Bukit Assek
- In office 20 May 2006 – 21 June 2014
- Preceded by: Daniel Ngieng Kiong Ann (SUPP-BN)
- Majority: 4751 (2006); 8827 (2011)
- In office 8 September 1996 – 27 September 2001
- Preceded by: Wong Soon Kai (SUPP-BN)
- Succeeded by: Daniel Ngieng Kiong Ann (SUPP-BN)
- Majority: 226 (1996)

Personal details
- Born: 21 December 1959 Sibu, Crown Colony of Sarawak
- Died: 21 June 2014 (aged 54) Sibu, Sarawak, Malaysia
- Citizenship: Malaysian
- Party: Democratic Action Party (DAP) – Pakatan Rakyat
- Spouse: Irene Chang (郑爱鸰)
- Children: 5
- Occupation: Politician
- Profession: Lawyer
- Website: holeng.dapsarawak.com

Wong Ho Leng (simplified Chinese: 黄和联; traditional Chinese: 黃和聯; pinyin: Huáng Hélián; 21 December 1959 – 21 June 2014) was a Malaysian politician. He was the opposition leader of the Sarawak State Assembly from May 2006 to June 2013. He was also the state chairman of the Democratic Action Party (DAP) from 2001 until 10 June 2013. He was the Member of the State Legislative Assembly of Sarawak for the seat of Bukit Assek until his death on 21 June 2014.

== Political career ==
Wong Ho Leng joined DAP on 19 April 1986. He made a stir in the Sarawak politics in 1996 state election when he defeated the Sarawak United Peoples' Party president and deputy chief minister of Sarawak Tan Sri Dr.Wong Soon Kai by a slim majority of 226 votes in the Bukit Assek constituency. He was subsequently defeated by Daniel Ngieng in 2001 state election, but wrested the same constituency back in 2006 state election.

Wong contested against the Barisan Nasional's Tiong Thai King in 1999 in the Lanang Parliamentary constituency but lost in that election. On 16 May 2010, he was elected to Parliament in the Sibu by-election. His victory saw the DAP wrest the seat from Barisan Nasional. He was the DAP candidate for Sibu in the 1995, 2004 and 2008 elections, but was defeated by Barisan Nasional's Robert Lau Hoi Chew on each occasion.

In 2011 state election, he successfully defended his constituency against Chieng Buong Toon of Sarawak United People's Party and independent candidate Hii Tiong Huat, with a huge majority of 8,827 votes, thus breaking the so-called the "Rhythm of the Pendulum", which was a hot topic among the politicians from both sides prior to the elections.

=== Suspension from State Assembly ===
In May 2009, Wong Ho Leng was suspended from the state assembly for 1 year due to his "camouflage" remark against the Second Finance Minister Datuk Seri Wong Soon Koh. The speaker, Datuk Seri Mohamad Asfia Awang Nassar, cited Section 14 (1) of the State Legislative Assembly (Privileges & Powers) Ordinance 2007 for the suspension after 60 Barisan Nasional assemblypersons voted in favour for Wong's suspension.

== Health ==
On 12 January 2013, Wong announced that he has been diagnosed of brain tumour (glioma) on his brain stem, which was responsible for the slurring of his speech and impaired swallowing function. He had undergone six-weeks of chemotherapy and radiotherapy in Singapore. On 23 February, he announced that he would not defend for the Sibu parliamentary seat in 2013 Malaysian general elections on doctors' advice. He went into a coma on 2 May 2014 but never woke up from it. On 17 May, the Sarawak government had approved RM 1 million to pay for Ho Leng's medical expenses.

== Death ==
He died on 21 June 2014 at Rejang Medical Centre, Sibu after a year-and-a-half struggle with brain cancer. His funeral service was held at Hwai Ang Methodist church and his remains were buried at Methodist Cemetery, Sibu.

== Election results ==
Parliament of Malaysia
Year	Constituency	Candidate	Votes	Pct	Opponent(s)	Votes	Pct	Ballots cast	Majority	Turnout
1986	P175 Lambir	Wong Ho Leng (DAP)	10,380	35.84%	Peter Chin Fah Kui (SUPP)	15,933	55.01%	29,486	5,553	60.06%
1986	P175 Lambir	Wong Ho Leng (DAP)	10,380	35.84%	Abang Ismail Abang Peel (IND)	2,651	9.15%	29,486	5,553	60.06%
1995	P184 Sibu	Wong Ho Leng (DAP)	10,472	39.18%	Robert Lau Hoi Chew (SUPP)	15,317	57.31%	27,316	4,845	69.39%
1995	P184 Sibu	Wong Ho Leng (DAP)	10,472	39.18%	Narawi Haron (IND)	937	3.51%	27,316	4,845	69.39%
1999	P184 Lanang	Wong Ho Leng (DAP)	9,466	36.80%	Tiong Thai King (SUPP)	16,256	63.20%	26,084	6,790	68.32%
2004	P211 Sibu	Wong Ho Leng (DAP)	17,161	45.57%	Robert Lau Hoi Chew (SUPP)	20,501	54.43%	38,216	3,340	62.82%
2008	P212 Sibu	Wong Ho Leng (DAP)	15,746	44.36%	Robert Lau Hoi Chew (SUPP)	19,138	53.38%	36,379	3,235	67.77%
2008	P212 Sibu	Wong Ho Leng (DAP)	15,746	44.36%	Lim Chin Chuang (PKR)	812	2.26%	36,379	3,235	67.77%
2010	P212 Sibu	Wong Ho Leng (DAP)	18,845	50.22%	Robert Lau Hui Yew (SUPP)	18,447	49.16%	38,111	398	69.68%
2010	P212 Sibu	Wong Ho Leng (DAP)	18,845	50.22%	Narawi Haron (IND)	232	0.62%	38,111	398	69.68%

Sarawak State Legislative Assembly
Year	Constituency	Candidate	Votes	Pct	Opponent(s)	Votes	Pct	Ballots Cast	Majority	Turnout
1987	N44 Miri	Wong Ho Leng (DAP)	6,079	29.8%	George Chan Hong Nam (SUPP)	14,352	70.2%	20,585	8,273	64.76%
1996	N39 Bukit Assek	Wong Ho Leng (DAP)	5,856	50.98%	Wong Soon Kai (SUPP)	5,630	49.02%	11,591	226	63.30%
2001	N39 Bukit Assek	Wong Ho Leng (DAP)	5,414	46.26%	Daniel Ngieng Kiong Ann (SUPP)	6,289	53.74%	11,767	875	66.08%
2006	N45 Bukit Assek	Wong Ho Leng (DAP)	10,380	64.84%	Daniel Ngieng Kiong Ann (SUPP)	5,629	35.16%	16,099	4,751	61.91%
2011	N45 Bukit Assek	Wong Ho Leng (DAP)	13,527	73.49%	Chieng Buong Toon (SUPP)	4,700	25.53%	18,518	8,827	68.77%
2011	N45 Bukit Assek	Wong Ho Leng (DAP)	13,527	73.49%	Hii Tiong Huat (IND)	180	0.98%	18,518	8,827	68.77%

== Publications ==
=== Posthumous publication ===
Last Writings (ISBN 978-967-19903-0-8) is a diary begun by Wong when he was diagnosed with a brain cancer on 21 December 2012. The book was written as he wanted to share his thoughts, fears, struggles and his determination to fight cancer with people of Sarawak especially Sibu. The book's last entry was on 2 October 2013, as Wong had lost his sense of coordination and balance on 18 September 2013. Last Writings was published in both English and Mandarin.
