= List of Melanau =

This is the list of prominent people of Melanau descent.

== Early history ==
- Pangeran Matusin (also known as Pangeran Mat Hussin Gagah) – Mukah Governor during Sultanate Brunei. His mother was a Melanau from Kampung Tellian while his father is a prince ("pangeran") from Brunei.
- Orang Kaya Selair – Leader of Matu district before and during reign of Brooke Dynasty
- Orang Kaya Srigunim – A woman who became the leader of Jemoreng district during reign of Brooke Dynasty, killed during pregnancy by her rival.
- Sawing – One of Sharif Masahor army leader during attack on Kanowit Fort 1859, who killed Henry Steel & Charles Fox. He was a Melanau of the Kanowit sub-group.
- Salakai – Sawing close friend who fought together during attack on Kanowit Fort 1859.

== Academics ==
- Associate Professor Dr Haji Abdul Mutalip Abdullah – The former dean of the Faculty of Social Sciences Universiti Malaysia Sarawak (UNIMAS)
- Datu Hj Adi Badiozaman Tuah – Well-known educationist. Former Education Director (Examinations) Malaysia. Director (Education) for Yayasan Islam Sarawak. He is of mixed Javanese, Malay and Melanau parentage.
- Associate Professor Dr. Jeniri bin Amir - Council of Professors fellow, former lecturer of the Faculty of Language and Communication, UNIMAS and a political analyst.
- Datuk Prof. Dr Rashid Abdullah – Academician UNIMAS.
- Prof Dr. Rohani Abdullah @ Josephine Yaman – Academician UPM
- Prof. Dr. Sulaiman Hanapi – Academician UNIMAS.
- Prof Datu Dr. Yusuf Hadi – Academician UNIMAS.

== Entertainment ==
=== Fashion ===
- Abdul Latip Mohti (1971 - 10 June 2020) – A fashion designer hailed from Mukah and the founder of Latip's Collections. In 2019, he was named "Most Promising Designer" at the Borneo Fashion Week. He was also known for his ‘Batik Linut’ (batik made from sago wax) design.
- Rozie Khan – designer and founder of Rozie Khan Couture. At the 2018 Borneo Fashion Week, she was awarded "Designer of the Year". She is of mixed Melanau, Chinese, Pakistani as well as Malay (Kampar Malay and Bruneian) parentage and hails from Dalat.

=== Music ===
- Anding Indrawani Zaini – Akademi Fantasia star, model, actor and singer. He is of mixed Melanau-Bidayuh parentage.
- Len Bubat – Melanau song composer/ producer/ lyricist (first Melanau original album 2002). This album Cinta Tuwah was launched by the Chief Minister of Sarawak in Miri, Sarawak during the Persatuan Melanau Miri 40th Anniversary Celebration on 24 October 2002. Two popular songs from this album are the "Blues Tubeng Balau" and "Bier Kou Tuwad."
- Roxy Ixzy - Bintang RTM 2024 winner. She is of mixed Bidayuh-Melanau parentage.
- Sazia Abang Selir - Winner of Bintang Kecil Kebangsaan 2000.
- Sharifah Zarina – A singer most notable for her hit, "Langit Ke-7". She is of Arab-Melanau parentage.

== Politics ==
- Abu Seman Jahwie – Former politician.
- YB Ahmad Johnie Zawawi- Member of Parliament of Igan since 2018
- Tun Pehin Sri Dr. Hj. Abdul Taib Mahmud – 4th Chief Minister of Sarawak & 7th Yang di-Pertua Negeri (Governor) of Sarawak.
- Tun Abdul Rahman Ya'kub – 3rd Chief Minister of Sarawak & 4th Yang di-Pertua Negeri (Governor) of Sarawak.
- Tun Ahmad Zaidi Adruce Muhammad Nor – 5th Yang di-Pertua Negeri (Governor) of Sarawak.
- Tun Pehin Sri Abang Muhammad Salahuddin Abang Barieng – 3rd and 6th Yang di-Pertua Negeri (Governor) of Sarawak.
- YB Dato' Sri Fatimah Abdullah – State Legislative Assembly Member for Dalat and Sarawak Minister of Welfare, Women and Family Development. She is of Foochow Chinese and Melanau descent.
- Lukanisman Awang Sauni – Member of Parliament of Sibuti since 2018.
- Datuk Dr. Annuar Rapaee – State Deputy Minister of Education and Talent Development since 2022, Member of the Legislative Assembly for Nangka since 2011.
- Datuk Hj Hamden Hj Ahmad – Former politician and a corporate figure (Oil-palm plantation).
- Dato Hanifah Hajar Taib – Member of Parliament for Mukah.
- Dato' Murshid Diraja Dr. Juanda Jaya – former Mufti of Perlis, former Deputy Mufti of Sarawak and current State Legislative Assembly Member for Jemoreng.
- Datu Haji Len Talif Salleh – Assistant Minister of Urban Development and Resources.
- Tan Sri Dato' Sri Dr. Muhammad Leo Michael Toyad – Former Federal Minister of Tourism; Chairman, Sarawak Conventions Bureau.
- Tan Sri Mohd Effendi Norwawi – Former Minister in the Prime Minister's Department, former Dalat Assemblyman;
- Dato' Seri Nancy Shukri – Federal Minister of Tourism, and Member of the Parliament for Batang Sadong. She is of mixed Malay, Melanau, Scottish, Iban and Chinese ancestry.
- Datuk Hajjah Norah Abdul Rahman – Daughter of Tun Abdul Rahman Ya'kub and former Member of Parliament of Tanjong Manis;
- Dato' Sri Sulaiman Abdul Rahman Taib – Son of Tun Abdul Taib Mahmud. A corporate figure who was Member of Parliament for Kota Samarahan;
- Datuk Wahab Dollah – Former politician.
- Yossibnosh Balo – State Legislative Assembly Member for Balingian.
- Cr. Mohammed Abdullah Izkandar bin Dato’ Roseley - Deputy Chairman of Sibu Municipal Council. He is the grandson of the late Tun Pehin Sri Abang Muhammad Salahuddin Abang Barieng – 3rd and 6th Yang di-Pertua Negeri (Governor) of Sarawak.

== Others ==
- Zaini Oje @ Ozea – former Director of Dewan Bahasa dan Pustaka (DBP) Sarawak & Sabah. A poet, writer, theater & stage director.
- Mohamad Taufan Mohamad Yassin – Social activist
- Hang Tuah Merawin – Resident, Kapit Division
- Hj Sarudu Hoklai – Permanent Secretary to Ministry of Planning (Sarawak). Former Resident, Mukah, Kota Samarahan and Kapit (Sarawak)
- Akit Sebli – Former Permanent Secretary Ministry of Tourism Sarawak
- Dr Haji Mohamad Topek Taufek Nahrawi – Businessman, developer and contractor, Former Deputy Chairman of SEDC, Academic
- Datu Aloysius J. Dris – CEO of Angkatan Zaman Mansang (AZAM) Sarawak.
- Edmund Kurui – Former assistant curator Sarawak Museum
- Datuk Hamid Sepawi – Corporate leader, CEO of Naim Cendera Group, well known property and housing developer and public listed company
- Sahari Ubu – Staff Sergeant Royal Corps of Signal British Army 1962 Staff No 23895416, Penghulu Kampung Nangka, Sibu.
- Datin Dyg Fatiyah Binti Tun Pehin Sri Abg Muhd Salahuddin - Penghulu Kampung Nangka & Kampung Banyok, Sibu.
- Tuan Haji Mohamad Atei Abang Medaan – Mayor (Datuk Bandar) of Kuching North (Dewan Bandaraya Kuching Utara (DBKU))
- Datuk Dr Yusof Hanifah – Former mayor of Kuching North (Dewan Bandaraya Kuching Utara (DBKU))
- Rapaee Kawi (a.k.a. Apai or Mashor) (1958–2009) – First Sarawakian to scale Mount Everest, ex-commando and Sarawak's most senior national press photographer
- Dr. Junaidi bin Hj. Diki – Public health medicine physician, senior HCISB consultant SAINS, Ex Dep Hos Director SGH, DHO Sibu/Kuching/Samarahan/Bintulu
- Datuk Haji Abang Abdul Wahap Haji Abang Julai – Mayor (Datuk Bandar) of Kuching North (Dewan Bandaraya Kuching Utara (DBKU))
- M. Zulfadhli Zainudin – Sarawakian tycoon, businessman, investor, and philanthropist
- Diana Rose – cultural activist and the founder of Lamin Dana Resort.
- Datu Sajeli bin Kipli – General Manager of the Land Custody and Development Authority (LCDA)
- Pemanca Albert Kiro bin Abau (The Late)
