= Abdul Rahman Junaidi =

Malaysian politician

Yang Berhormat Datuk Haji Abdul Rahman Junaidi MLA PGBK
- ابدول رحمن جونايدي

Deputy Minister in the Premier's Department for DBKU, Islamic Affairs and Project Coordinator for Regional Development Agency
- Incumbent
- Assumed office 2022
- Governor: Abdul Taib Mahmud (2022-2024); Wan Junaidi Tuanku Jaafar (since 2024)
- Premier: Abang Johari
- Preceded by: Position established

Assistant Minister of Utilities for Water Supply
- In office 2017–2022
- Governor: Abdul Taib Mahmud
- Chief Minister: Abang Johari
- Succeeded by: Position abolished

Assistant Minister in Chief Minister's Office for Islamic Affairs and Kuching North City Commission
- In office 2017–2022
- Governor: Abdul Taib Mahmud
- Chief Minister: Abang Johari
- Succeeded by: Position abolished

Member of the Sarawak State Legislative Assembly for Pantai Damai
- Incumbent
- Assumed office 2001
- Preceded by: Sharifah Mordiah Tuanku Fauzi

Personal details
- Born: Abdul Rahman bin Junaidi; 26 January 1961 (age 65) Kampung Seberang Hilir, Kuching, Crown Colony of Sarawak
- Citizenship: Malaysian
- Party: PBB
- Other political affiliations: Barisan Nasional (till 2018); Gabungan Parti Sarawak (since 2018)
- Spouse: Siti Shorgayah Ahmad Zaidin
- Education: Sekolah Rendah Kebangsaan Padungan; SM Sains Sultan Haji Ahmad Shah; Universiti Malaya
- Occupation: Politician
- Profession: Medical doctor

Abdul Rahman bin Junaidi is a Malaysian politician from PBB. He has served as the Member of the Sarawak State Legislative Assembly for Pantai Damai since 2001. He is also the Deputy Minister in the Premier's Department for DBKU, Islamic Affairs and Project Coordinator for Regional Development Agency.

== Politics ==
Abdul Rahman joined PBB in 1994 and became the Chief of Youth Wing of PBB Kampung Sourabaya Hilir branch shortly after. He has served as Assistant Minister in Chief Minister's Office for Islamic Affairs and Kuching North City Commission from 2017 to 2022, and Assistant Minister of Utilities for Water Supply from 2017 to 2022. He is also the Treasurer-General of PBB.

== Election results ==
Sarawak State Legislative Assembly
Year	Constituency	Candidate	Votes	Pct.	Opponent(s)	Votes	Pct.	Ballots cast	Majority	Turnout
2001	N03 Pantai Damai	Abdul Rahman Junaidi (PBB)	6,072	66.66%	Husaini Hamdan (PKR)	2,757	30.27%	9,221	3,315	74.22%
2001	N03 Pantai Damai	Abdul Rahman Junaidi (PBB)	6,072	66.66%	Norita Azmi (IND)	280	3.07%	9,221	3,315	74.22%
2006	N04 Pantai Damai	Abdul Rahman Junaidi (PBB)	5,217	63.08%	Idris Bohari (PKR)	3,053	36.92%	8,388	2,164	69.47%
2011	N04 Pantai Damai	Abdul Rahman Junaidi (PBB)	7,425	75.08%	Wan Zainal Abidin Wan Senusi (PKR)	2,354	23.80%	10,038	5,071	71.17%
2011	N04 Pantai Damai	Abdul Rahman Junaidi (PBB)	7,425	75.08%	Suhaini Selamat (IND)	111	1.12%	10,038	5,071	71.17%
2016	N04 Pantai Damai	Abdul Rahman Junaidi (PBB)	10,918	86.82%	Zainal Abidin Yet (PAS)	1,658	13.18%	12,851	9,260	69.81%
2021	N04 Pantai Damai	Abdul Rahman Junaidi (PBB)	10,699	82.19%	Mahmud Sabli (PSB)	2,318	17.81%	13,298	8,381	64.85%

== Honours ==
- Sarawak :
  - Commander of the Order of the Star of Hornbill Sarawak (PGBK) – Datuk (2018)
