= Samarahan =

Samarahan may refer to:

- Samarahan Division, one of the twelve administrative divisions of Sarawak, Malaysia.
- Samarahan District, one of the three administrative districts within the Samarahan Division.
- Samarahan (federal constituency), a defunct federal constituency in Sarawak, Malaysia.
