= Sharifah Hasidah Sayeed Aman Ghazali =

Malaysian politician

Yang Berhormat Datuk Hajah Sharifah Hasidah Sayeed Aman Ghazali MLA PGBK
- سهاريفاه هاسيداه سايد امان غزالي

Deputy Minister in the Premier's Department for Law, MA63 and State-Federal Relations
- Incumbent
- Assumed office 2022
- Governor: Abdul Taib Mahmud (2022-2024); Wan Junaidi Tuanku Jaafar (since 2024)
- Premier: Abang Johari
- Preceded by: Position established

Assistant Minister in the Chief Minister's Department for Law, State-Federal Relations and Project Monitoring
- In office 2017–2022
- Governor: Abdul Taib Mahmud
- Chief Minister: Abang Johari
- Succeeded by: Position abolished

Member of the Sarawak State Legislative Assembly for Semariang
- Incumbent
- Assumed office 2006
- Preceded by: Sharifah Mordiah Tuanku Fauzi

Personal details
- Born: Sharifah Hasidah binti Sayeed Aman Ghazali; 31 October 1969 (age 56) Kuching, Sarawak
- Citizenship: Malaysian
- Party: PBB
- Other political affiliations: Barisan Nasional (till 2018); Gabungan Parti Sarawak (since 2018)
- Spouse: Sayeed Mohd Hussein Wan Abdul Rahman
- Parent: Sharifah Mordiah Tuanku Fauzi (mother)
- Education: Universiti Malaysia Sarawak
- Occupation: Politician
- Profession: Lawyer

Sharifah Hasidah binti Sayeed Aman Ghazali is a Malaysian politician from PBB. She has served as the Member of the Sarawak State Legislative Assembly for Samariang since 2006. She is also the Deputy Minister in the Premier's Department for Law, MA63 and State-Federal Relations since 2022.

== Politics ==
Sharifah Hasidah is the Vice Chief of PBB Women Wing.

== Election results ==
Sarawak State Legislative Assembly
Year	Constituency	Candidate	Votes	Pct.	Opponent(s)	Votes	Pct.	Ballots cast	Majority	Turnout
2006	Semariang	Sharifah Hasidah Sayeed Aman Ghazali (PBB)	5,365	65.09%	Wan Zainal Abidin Wan Senusi (PKR)	2,877	34.91%	8,422	2,488	62.39%
2011	Semariang	Sharifah Hasidah Sayeed Aman Ghazali (PBB)	8,008	75.65%	Zulrusdi Mohamad Hol (PKR)	2,577	24.35%	10,769	5,431	67.55%
2016	Semariang	Sharifah Hasidah Sayeed Aman Ghazali (PBB)	9,795	80.16%	Yusof Assidiqqi Ahmad Sharkawi (PAS)	2,035	16.65%	12,397	7,760	67.93%
2016	Semariang	Sharifah Hasidah Sayeed Aman Ghazali (PBB)	9,795	80.16%	Nani Sahari (AMANAH)	389	3.19%	12,397	7,760	67.93%
2021	Semariang	Sharifah Hasidah Sayeed Aman Ghazali (PBB)	11,354	87.61%	Abg Abdul Halil Abg Laili (AMANAH)	1,071	8.26%	13,183	10,283	61.71%
2021	Semariang	Sharifah Hasidah Sayeed Aman Ghazali (PBB)	11,354	87.61%	Othman Abdillah (SEDAR)	535	4.13%	13,183	10,283	61.71%

== Honours ==
- Sarawak :
  - Commander of the Order of the Star of Hornbill Sarawak (PGBK) – Datuk (2019)
