= 1981 Sebandi by-election =

Election in Malaysia

- Not contested (scheduled on 25–28 March 1981)

Sebandi seat in the Sarawak State Legislative Assembly
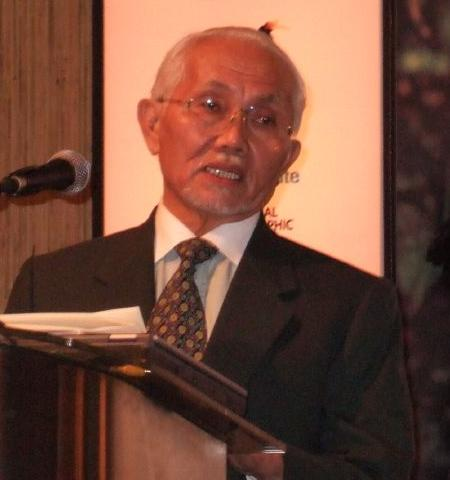
Candidate	Abdul Taib Mahmud
Party	BN (PBB)
Popular vote	N/A
Percentage	N/A
Sebandi assemblyman before election
Sharifah Mordiah
BN (PBB)
Elected Sebandi assemblyman
Abdul Taib Mahmud
BN (PBB)

The 1981 Sebandi by-election is a by-election for the Sarawak State Legislative Assembly state seat of Sebandi, Malaysia that were scheduled to be held on 25 to 28 March 1981. It was called following the resignation of the incumbent, Sharifah Mordiah Tuanku Fauzi on 18 March 1981.

== Background ==
Sharifah Mordiah, a candidate of Barisan Nasional (BN), were first elected the Sarawak state seat of Sebandi at the 1979 Sarawak state election. She were the member of BN's component party Parti Pesaka Bumiputera Bersatu (PBB).

On 18 February 1981, Sharifah Mordiah resigned from her state seat of Sebandi, resulting of the seat to be vacated. This necessitates for a by-election to be held, as the seat were vacated more that 2 years before the expiry of the Sarawak state assembly current term. Election Commission of Malaysia (SPR) announced that the by-election will be held on 25 to 28 March 1981, with 10 March 1981 set as the nomination day.

== Nomination and campaign ==
BN nominated Abdul Taib Mahmud, the deputy-president of PBB, and member of Parliament for Samarahan, as candidate for the seat. He were the Minister of Federal Territory in the federal government, before resigning from the role on 7 March 1981 to contest the state seat. He were also the Sebandi assemblymen until 1969 Sarawak state election, where he instead contested and won the Samarahan federal seat. Opposition parties have said that they would not contest this by-election, this would see Abdul Taib win the by-election by a walkover.

After nomination closed on 10 March 1981, it was confirmed only Abdul Taib from BN handed his nomination papers, resulting of him winning the seat unopposed.

== Timeline ==
The key dates are listed below.

Date	Event
	Issue of the Writ of Election
10 March 1981	Nomination Day
11 - 24 March 1981	Campaigning Period
	Early polling day for postal and overseas voters
25 - 28 March 1981	Polling Day

== Results ==
Sarawak state by-election, 25-28 March 1981: Sebandi Upon the resignation of incumbent, Sharifah Mordhiah
Party	Candidate	Votes	%	∆%
On the nomination day, Abdul Taib Mahmud won uncontested.
BN	Abdul Taib Mahmud			
Total valid votes			100.00	
Total rejected ballots				
Unreturned ballots				
Turnout				
Registered electors		N/A		
Majority				
BN hold		Swing	N/A	

== Aftermath ==
Abdul Taib were appointed the new Chief Minister of Sarawak on 26 March 1981, a day after the previous CM, Abdul Rahman Ya'kub resigned from the role to be appointed the new Yang di-Pertua Negeri of Sarawak.
