= Abdul Taib Mahmud =

Malaysian politician and 7th Governor of Sarawak (1936–2024)

Yang Amat Berbahagia Tun Pehin Sri Abdul Taib Mahmud SMN SBS DK I (Johor) DK I (Brunei) DK II (Pahang) PSM SPMJ SSDK SSAP DPPN SPDK SSSA SPMT DGSM SUMW DP DA SPMB PGDK PCh
- عبدالطيب محمود
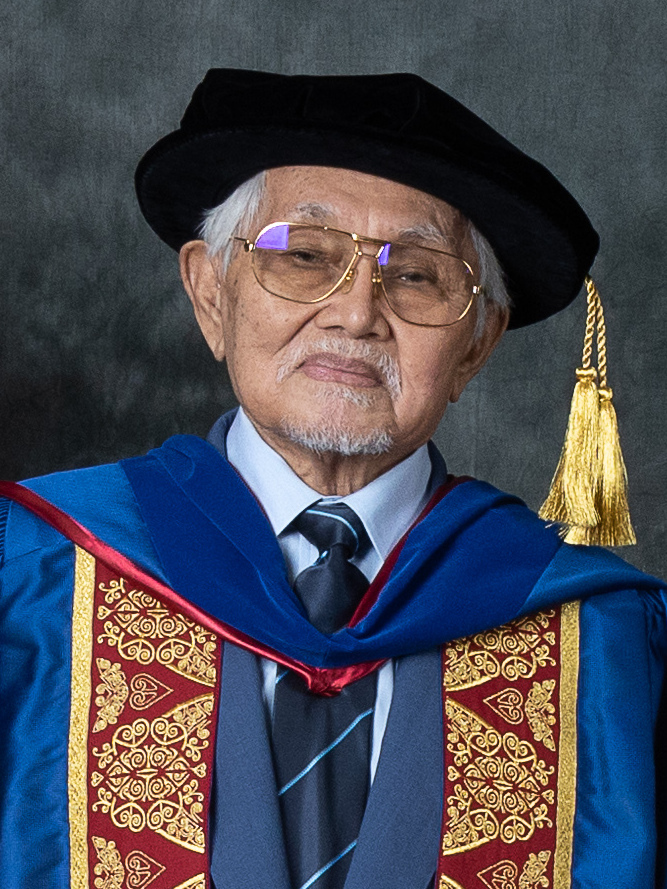
- Taib in 2022

7th Yang di-Pertua Negeri of Sarawak
- In office 1 March 2014 – 25 January 2024
- Premier: Abang Johari
- Chief Minister: Adenan Satem (until 2017); Abang Johari (from 2017)
- Preceded by: Abang Muhammad Salahuddin
- Succeeded by: Wan Junaidi Tuanku Jaafar

4th Chief Minister of Sarawak
- In office 26 March 1981 – 28 February 2014
- Governor: See list: Abdul Rahman Ya'kub; Ahmad Zaidi Adruce; Abang Muhammad Salahuddin
- Deputy: See list: Sim Kheng Hong (1974–1991); Alfred Jabu Numpang (1976–2016); Daniel Tajem (1979–1986); Wong Soon Kai (1991–1996); George Chan (1996–2011)
- Preceded by: Abdul Rahman Ya'kub
- Succeeded by: Adenan Satem

2nd and 4th President of Parti Pesaka Bumiputera Bersatu
- In office 26 March 1981 – 28 February 2014
- BN chairman: See list: Hussein Onn Mahathir Mohamad Abdullah Ahmad Badawi Mohd Najib Razak
- Preceded by: Abdul Rahman Ya'kub
- Succeeded by: Adenan Satem
- In office October 1974 – 1976
- Preceded by: Jugah Anak Barieng
- Succeeded by: Abdul Rahman Ya'kub

Member of the Malaysian Parliament for Kota Samarahan
- In office 1970 – 13 February 2008
- Succeeded by: Sulaiman Abdul Rahman Taib

Member of the Sarawak State Legislative Assembly for Balingian
- In office 2001 – 28 February 2014
- Preceded by: Abdul Ajis Abdul Majeed
- Succeeded by: Yussibnosh Balo
- Majority: 5,154 (2011)

Member of the Sarawak State Legislative Assembly for Asajaya
- In office 1987–2001
- Preceded by: New constituency
- Succeeded by: Abdul Karim Rahman Hamzah

Member of the Sarawak State Legislative Assembly for Sebandi
- In office 1981–1987
- Preceded by: Sharifah Mordiah Tuanku Fauzi
- Succeeded by: Constituency abolished

Personal details
- Born: Abdul Taib bin Mahmud; 21 May 1936 Miri, Raj of Sarawak
- Died: 21 February 2024 (aged 87) Kuala Lumpur, Malaysia
- Party: Barisan Rakayat Jati Sarawak (1963–1968); Parti Bumiputera Sarawak (1968–1973); Parti Pesaka Bumiputera Bersatu (since 1973)
- Spouses: Laila Chaleck Taib (m. 1959; died 2009) Raghad Alkurdi Taib (m. 2010)
- Children: 4 (including Sulaiman and Hanifah)
- Education: University of Adelaide (LLB)
- Occupation: Politician; prosecutor; judge's associate

Abdul Taib bin Mahmud (Jawi: عبدالطيب بن محمود; 21 May 1936 – 21 February 2024) was a Malaysian politician who served as the seventh Yang di-Pertua Negeri of Sarawak from 2014 to 2024. A member of Parti Pesaka Bumiputera Bersatu, he was the fourth Chief Minister of Sarawak from 1981 to 2014 and represented Balingian in Sarawak State Legislative Assembly from 2001 to 2014. He is commonly known as the Father of Modern Sarawak (Bapa Pemodenan Sarawak).

Born into a noble Melanau-Malay family in Miri during the Raj of Sarawak, Taib graduated from University of Adelaide in 1960 with a first degree in law. There, he met Laila (née Lejla Chaleck), a Polish woman of Lipka Tatar descent who embraced the Muslim faith. They married the previous year and had four children, including Sulaiman and Hanifah. Upon graduation, they returned to Sarawak, and Taib began his career as a prosecutor at the Crown Council Law Office. His foray into politics began in 1963 when he was appointed the state's Minister of Communications and Public Works by Chief Minister Stephen Kalong Ningkan. His political works deepened in 1964 when he assumed the role of vice chairman of Barisan Rakyat Jati Sarawak (BERJASA) party. He then served as state Minister of Development and Forestry under Tawi Sli in 1967. Taib then transitioned to federal politics, securing a seat as a Member of Parliament (MP) for Kota Samarahan in 1970. Over the course of his parliamentary career spanning from 1968 to 1981, Taib held multiple ministerial portfolios under Prime Ministers Tunku Abdul Rahman, Abdul Razak Hussein, Hussein Onn and Mahathir Mohamad.

In 1981, Taib returned to Sarawak and became its chief minister, succeeding his uncle Abdul Rahman Ya'kub. Throughout his leadership, accusations of corruption and allegations of personal gain from Sarawak's abundant natural resources marred his reputation. However, Taib's administration was also credited with significantly reducing the state's poverty rate from 70 percent to single-digit figures. He was informally known as Pak Uban, which translates to 'White-haired Uncle.' Among Chinese-speaking communities, he was referred to as Pek Moh, meaning 'white hair.' Another informal appellation for him, stemming from the British Brooke family's rule over Sarawak as White Rajahs in the 19th and early 20th centuries, was the 'last white rajah' or 'white-haired rajah.'

In 2008, after nearly four decades in Parliament, Taib relinquished his role as an MP, making him the second longest-serving parliamentarian in Malaysia. The following year, Laila died following a prolonged battle with heart cancer. Taib then married a Syrian-born woman, Ragad Waleed Alkurdi. Subsequently, in 2014, he stepped down as Chief Minister and was succeeded by Adenan Satem. His tenure, spanning an unprecedented 33 years, earned him the distinction of being the longest-serving head of government in a Malaysian state. Taib was then appointed the seventh Yang di-Pertua Negeri of Sarawak, from 2014 until 2024. Shortly afterwards, he died just over 3 weeks after leaving office.

== Early life and education ==
Taib Mahmud was born at Kampung Sungei Merbau, Miri, Sarawak, on 21 May 1936. He was the eldest child of Mahmud bin Haji Abang Yahya (father) and Hajjah Hamidah binti Yakub (mother). Taib had nine siblings namely Ibrahim, Onn, Mohammad Ali, Mohammad Arip, Mohammad Tufail, Aisah Zainab, Roziah, Faridah Hanon and Zaleha. Taib's father was a descendant of Pehin Datu Yahya Setia Raja, where the latter was an aristocrat that was linked to the Royal Court of Brunei. However, Taib had an impoverished life because his father worked as a carpenter for Shell Oil Company. Taib's uncle, Abdul Rahman Ya'kub raised Taib from the time when he was a boy.

Taib was five years old when the Japanese army landed in Miri in 1941. Taib's father, considering his family's safety from Japanese occupation, decided to move his family to his ancestral village in Mukah. After the war ended, the family returned to Miri. Taib undertook his early schooling at Andi Malay School and later St Joseph's Primary School in Miri. Taib later won a Shell scholarship to study at St. Joseph's Secondary School in Kuching with the help of his uncle, Abdul Rahman who was also a Probationary Native Officer in Miri. There, Taib met George Chan Hong Nam who would later become the deputy chief minister of Sarawak and Bujang bin Mohammed Nor who would later become Sarawak state secretary under the Taib's chieftainship.

After school, Taib Mahmud planned to become a doctor but he was persuaded by Abdul Rahman to take up law. According to Taib:

I was obliged to study law because of family pressures and expectations. I preferred medicine because I felt Sarawak dearly needed doctors. I was maneuvered toward law by my uncle. When I entered politics in 1963, I told myself that I would give Parti Bumiputera five years of my life.

— Abdul Taib Mahmud, as reported by Douglas Bullis in 1996.

In 1958, his excellent performance in the Higher School Certificate (HSC) examination earned him a Colombo Plan scholarship, allowing Taib to further his studies at the University of Adelaide in South Australia. He graduated with Bachelor of Laws degree from the university in 1960. After graduation, he was appointed an associate to Justice Sir Herbert Mayo of the Supreme Court of South Australia. After the demise of his father, Taib took up the responsibility to look after his siblings and to discipline his siblings in studies and in looking after the household. Taib Mahmud pursued his postgraduate studies at Harvard International Summer Course in 1964.

== Early political career ==
On returning to Sarawak, Taib worked in the Crown Council from 1962 to 1963. He was then persuaded by his uncle to take part in the formation of Barisan Ra'ayat Jati Sarawak (BARJASA) party. Taib resigned from Crown Council and assumed the post of vice-chairman of BARJASA in 1963. In the 1963 local council elections, Taib's BARJASA party won only 44 out of 429 seats. Taib's uncle was defeated in the election. Sarawak National Party (SNAP) became a majority party with Stephen Kalong Ningkan as the state's first chief minister. However, Taib was able to join the Council Negri of Sarawak (now Sarawak State Legislative Assembly) on 22 July 1963, where he was appointed state minister for Communication and Works from 1963 to 1966 although Taib did not contest the election. In Taib's own words, he said that:

I never aimed to become a minister. I didn't even stand for election although I had helped BARJASA by speaking at party conventions about the importance of democracy. I felt that I did not have sufficient experience or outlook to decide weighty matters of the state. However, since at that time there were few people available with the degree and kind of education I had, I decided to give those five years of my life. Curiously enough, when I returned from Australia to Sarawak as a lawyer, I dreamed of becoming a judge one day. Now I am glad I didn't. My temperament wasn't right for it.

— Abdul Taib Mahmud, as reported by Douglas Bullis in 1996.

=== 1966 Sarawak constitutional crisis ===
Although Taib was a minister in the Sarawak cabinet with a superior education background, he was frustrated when his BARJASA party was consulted last after expatriate, SNAP party, and Sarawak Chinese Association (SCA) were consulted in a cabinet decision making. Taib's anger towards Ningkan's leadership intensified in 1965 when Ningkan decided to pass a land bill which would allow Chinese to purchase native land. BARJASA party later formed an alliance with Parti Negara Sarawak (PANAS), and Parti Pesaka Sarawak (PESAKA) in order to challenge Ningkan. Taib and another BARJASA leader Awang Hipni was expelled from Sarawak cabinet by Ningkan. In June 1966, Taib and his BARJASA partner was re-accepted into the cabinet in order to end the ruling coalition crisis. However, the crisis between SNAP and BARJASA worsened into a constitutional crisis and Ningkan was removed as chief minister in 1966.

=== Appointment to minister in federal cabinet ===
Taib later became Minister of Development and Forestry in 1967 under the leadership of new Sarawak chief minister Tawi Sli. On several occasions, Taib acted as Chief Minister. Taib later fall out with Tawi Sli. Taib decided to shift his focus onto the Malaysian federal cabinet. Taib was appointed Federal Assistant Minister for Commerce and Industry from 1968 until 1970. He represented Parti Bumiputera Sarawak, which was a component party of Sarawak Alliance, in 1969 Malaysian general election. During the 1970 parliamentary election for Sarawak, he was elected as the member of Malaysian parliament for Kota Samarahan seat. He was later appointed to numerous portfolios including Deputy Minister in the Prime Minister's Department (1970–1972) and Natural Resources Minister (1972–1974). In 1973, Taib was appointed deputy president of the newly formed PBB before subsequently becoming the president of the party. Abdul Rahman Ya'kub was Taib's political mentor for 20 years. In 1980, Taib was appointed federal territory minister which would be the Taib's last portfolio before he returned to Sarawak. He had good personal relationship with Mahathir Mohamad, who would later become Malaysian fourth prime minister. Taib stepped down from federal cabinet post on 9 March 1981.

== Chief Minister (1981–2014) ==
In order to let Taib to become an elected representative in Sarawak state assembly, a PBB assembly woman vacated the Sebandi (now Asajaya) seat and a by-election was held in March 1981. Taib won the seat unopposed. He was later appointed Sarawak's Land and Mines Minister. On 26 March 1981, Taib's uncle, Abdul Rahman, who was the chief minister of Sarawak at that time, announced his retirement from politics by vacating his state constituency of Paloh and PBB presidency. However, the Malaysian federal government favoured the appointment of Sulaiman Daud as the next chief minister because Taib was away from Sarawak for 13 years. Abdul Rahman was able to convince the federal leaders to appoint Taib as chief minister because Daud was much more junior than Taib. Taib retained entire cabinet line-up of his uncle except for Celestine Ujang who would vacate his ministerial post to become speaker in the Sarawak state assembly. Daud would later fill the federal ministerial post left vacant by Taib.

Taib held the Sebandi seat until 1987, when he was elected as state assemblyman for the Asajaya constituency. In 2001 state election, he decided to contest in Balingian. Taib served in many public and voluntary bodies and represented the government at various international conferences.

Taib described a ban on the use of "Allah" in Christian bibles in Sarawak as a "stupid decision". This ban was later lifted.

=== 1987 Ming Court Affair ===
Dissatisfaction with the Taib leadership arose when a group of PBB politicians claimed that the interests of Bumiputeras were being neglected. The group claimed Taib Mahmud had exclusively favoured the Chinese and Sarawak United Peoples' Party (SUPP). The Dayaks in the Sarawak Dayak People's Party (PBDS) were quite frustrated because the Chief Minister post had not been in their hands for 17 years. However, the main factor for upheaval in PBDS was the suspicion of Chief Minister Taib towards Leo Moggie, the PBDS president. According to a doctoral dissertation written by David Walter Brown, fissures between the factions controlled by Taib and his uncle, Tun Abdul Rahman Ya'kub gradually developed after Rahman Ya'kub stepped down as Chief Minister. In 1985, Rahman Ya'kub was also removed from the office of governor by Taib himself. This caused Rahman Ya'kub to launch a series of attacks against Taib in 1987, widely known as the Ming Court Affair.

Rahman Ya'kub headed a group of disappointed Sarawak politicians from Sarawak National Party (SNAP) and PBDS to gather in Ming Court Hotel in Kuala Lumpur to move a motion of no confidence against Taib's leadership by signing letters collectively. Daniel Tajem, a former deputy chief minister and Leo Moggie were the other main plotters of this affair. Seeing such a political crisis, Taib immediately called for a snap state election in 1987, which he narrowly won. His coalition won 28 out of 48 seats in the state assembly and later received another 8 defected assemblymen from PBDS, decreasing the original seats for PBDS from 15 to 7. PBDS remained in the opposition until it was readmitted into Sarawak BN in 1994. The internal bickering of SNAP and PBDS has benefited the rule of Taib in the years to come.

=== Development policy ===
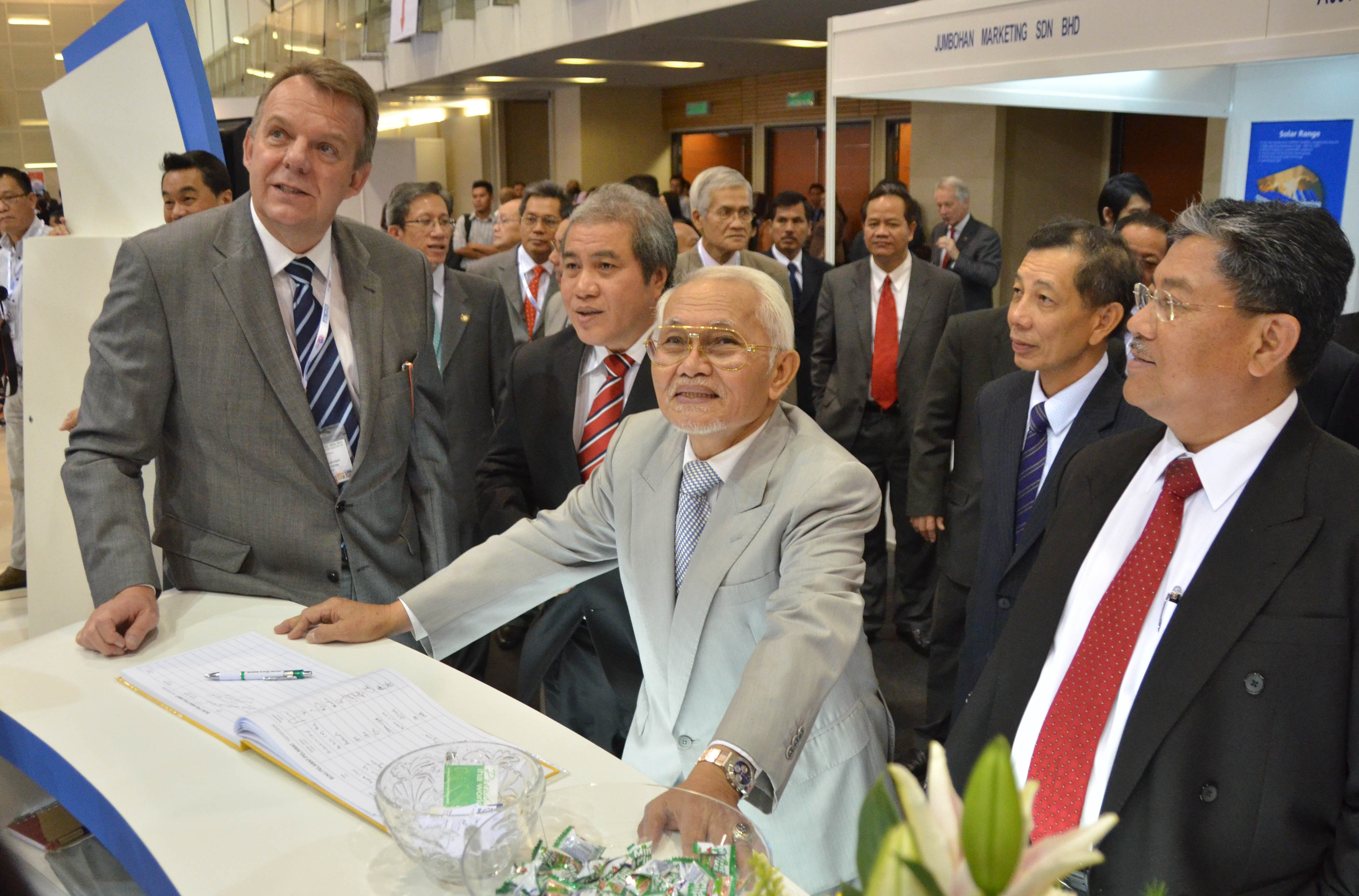
Taib Mahmud (3rd from left) during International Energy Week at Borneo Convention Centre Kuching; together with Torstein Dale Sjøtveit, CEO of Sarawak Energy Berhad (left most)

Eco-tourism forms a major part of the economy of Sarawak. Taib's administration with the help of the Malaysian federal government made Sarawak's World Heritage more accessible through the construction of the Pan Borneo Highway. Manufacturing, industrial, and tourism sector are given special attention. High technology industries aimed to play a role into the economic expansion and creation of jobs in the state. As a result of Taib Mahmud's policy of development, Sarawak GDP growth exceeded national average in 1995. To balance the development between urban and rural areas, Taib Mahmud also endorsed town planning, natural resources planning, large-scale plantations, and native customary land (NCR) development. However, cases of exploitation of NCR lands for logging, mining, and plantation purposes have also been reported. Sarawak is the first state in Malaysia to fully implement the e-government initiative while the Sarawak State Library is the first e-library in Malaysia. Sarawak Corridor of Renewable Energy (SCORE) which was introduced in 2008, is aimed to diversify the future economy of Sarawak.

Since 1981, the Gross Domestic Product (GDP) has grown from RM 6.5 billion to RM 19.7 billion in 1995 and increased further to an estimated RM 29.9 billion in 1999. In 1995, 31.9% of the population was living in poverty and 10% in hard-core poverty. By 1997, the incidence of poverty was down to 7.5% and hard-core poverty went down to 0.7%. In 1980, only 31.8% of people of Sarawak had water supply, but in 1995, the figure has reached 85% of the population.

But Sarawak's prosperity is not evenly shared across the socio-economic classes. Unlike the data above, academics and non-governmental organisations (NGOs) that are independent of Taib's PBB party revealed that the large disparity between urban and rural poverty remains a major challenge for Taib's three decades-old administration.

During his tenure, Taib was able to marshal the co-operation of leaders from different political parties to reach a common political consensus. Taib considered that his proudest achievements are in terms of economic development, social integration and industrialisation in Sarawak.

=== Environmental policy ===
Environmental programmes under the Taib administration include the Heart 2 Heart orangutan campaign which invites the public to get involved with orangutan conservation; orangutan and turtle adoption; protection of the dugong and the Irrawaddy dolphin, which are both endangered species; and the Reef Ball project that will rehabilitate Sarawak's ocean ecosystem by placing artificial reef modules in the sea to form new habitats.

In 1992, International Tropical Timber Organization (ITTO) also financed the establishment of Lanjak Entimau Wildlife Sanctuary which now houses about 4000 orangutans. This wildlife century also aimed to improve the livelihood of the rural population and to reduce their dependence on forests.

=== 2030 vision for Sarawak ===
During the celebrations of Taib's 28th year in power as the chief minister of Sarawak, speaking at Dewan Suarah Bintulu Taib said that his vision for Sarawak was for it to become the richest state in Malaysia by the year 2030. It was the intention of Taib and his administration to develop more high-skilled jobs.

To achieve this, the state is investing money in developing new higher education institutions. This policy is intended to help move the economy away from industry which relies heavily on Sarawak's natural resources to a more skilled, serviced-based economy.

=== Sarawak Cabinet reshuffle ===
Taib announced his cabinet reshuffle on 8 November 2009. Six new state assemblymen were appointed as assistant ministers, while the portfolios of others were changed. Five out of the six new appointees were sworn in on 21 November 2009 before the state governor, Tun Datuk Patinggi Abang Muhamad Salahuddin in the state assembly. The remaining assistant minister, Abdul Wahab Aziz, was on a pilgrimage. The new cabinet line-up took effect on 1 December 2009.

Taib, who retained the Finance, and Planning and Resource Management Minister portfolios, said the reorganisation was meant to prepare Sarawak for new development policies and approaches that could take place some time in the 10th Malaysia Plan (10MP) or after the next state election. He also said that with the Sarawak Corridor of Renewable Energy (SCORE) coming up, he would reform Syarikat SESCO Berhad (SESCO) in the next one or two years.

On 28 September 2011, Taib again announced another cabinet reshuffle with the appointment of Senior Ministers in the cabinet and renaming several ministries. Taib also created new ministries that focused on the welfare, women and family development.

=== 2011 state election and aftermath ===
Despite being the target of an onslaught of attacks by the opposition Pakatan Rakyat coalition, Taib led PBB to a clean sweep of seats contested in the 2011 state election, winning an eighth consecutive term as chief minister. However, the Barisan Nasional coalition suffered its worst performance ever in a Sarawak state election, with coalition partner Sarawak United People's Party (SUPP) suffering badly due to his poor standing among the Chinese community. Following the election, he was under pressure from the BN national leadership to step down to avoid hurting BN's prospects during the next general election. Despite this, Taib remained vague about his retirement plans.

== Yang di-Pertua Negeri of Sarawak (2014–2024) ==
After resigning as chief minister, Taib Mahmud was appointed the seventh Governor of Sarawak on 1 March 2014. Following this appointment, Taib was bestowed title "Tun" on 26 May 2014. He was re-appointed Governor on 28 February 2018 and again on 28 February 2022. His term ended early on 26 January 2024, and was succeeded by Wan Junaidi Tuanku Jaafar on the same day.

== Controversies ==
Taib Mahmud was accused of being responsible for the environmental destruction that took place in Sarawak during his tenure as chief minister. This Swiss environmentalist, Bruno Manser, held Taib "personally responsible" for the destruction of Sarawak rainforests.

Taib Mahmud was noted to rely on a patronage system to reward "compliant local leaders" and stifle potential opposition. He and his relatives were "widely thought to extract a percentage from most major commercial contracts – including those for logging – awarded in the state (Sarawak)" according to a series of leaked US embassy cables published in August 2011. Taib Mahmud was reported to have tight control over logging industry. This enabled him to use timber concessions for personal and family enrichment. He had contributed for accelerating the pace of logging in Sarawak. Taib was alleged to favour his family members in various business appointments in Sarawak. The companies which have relationships with the chief minister's family such as Cahya Mata Sarawak Berhad (CMSB), Naim Holdings Berhad, Sarawak Energy, Ta Ann, and Titanium Management Sdn Bhd have benefited from various state contracts, concessions, and land dealings.

However, Taib Mahmud said that he did not ask anybody to do his sons a favour for the positions in CMSB and other companies. He also insisted that his family made money through their own hard work. His cabinet minister, in an interview with Al Jazeera English, maintained that the contracts were awarded transparently either in open or closed tenders. He said that the state government gave the contracts based on the previous good track record of the companies, not because of the alleged political connections.

In 2007, Taib sued Malaysiakini for publishing reports where Tokyo Regional Taxation Bureau alleged that nine Japanese companies paid RM 32 million in kickbacks to a Hong Kong-based company linked to the chief minister and family to transport logs from Sarawak to Japan. The taxation bureau later reversed its decision on the matter, stating that the payments were legitimate. Malaysiakini also posted an apology for the embarrassment caused to Taib. Taib withdrew the case after an out-of-court settlement with Malaysiakini in 2012.

As of February 2014, Malaysian Anti-Corruption Commission (MACC) has found no evidence that Taib had abused his political office for corruption because approval of land and logging areas were made by Taib's senior ministers or the Sarawak cabinet rather than Taib himself. This is in accordance with Section 23 of the Malaysian Anti-Corruption Commission Act 2009 where a person cannot be charged for corruption if there is no evidence that he has personally made the decision to award a contract to himself, relatives, or associates. In 2019, Pakatan Harapan law minister Liew Vui Keong stated there was no new evidence for MACC to reopen its investigations against Taib.

The University of Adelaide had a plaza named after Taib, which was removed over accusations of illegal deforestation.

== Personal life ==
=== Family ===
Taib wed 18-year-old Laila Taib, a Polish Muslim of Lipka Tatar origin, at South Australia's Adelaide mosque on 13 January 1959. On 29 April 2009, Taib's wife Laila died of cancer. She was buried at the Demak Jaya cemetery in Kuching the following day.

Taib's mother Hajah Hamidah Yakub died in Normah Specialist Medical Centre, Kuching due to old age at 90 years old when Taib Mahmud was hospitalised in Singapore and underwent surgery to remove a suspected cancerous lump in his colon on 11 January 2006. Taib's son Sulaiman Abdul Rahman was married to Anisa, who is the daughter of Deputy Chief Minister of Sarawak Datuk Patinggi Tan Sri Dr George Chan Hong Nam. His daughter, Jamilah Taib Murray and husband Sean Murray are involved in Sakto property development in Ottawa, Ontario, Canada. In 2009, Taib's four-year-old granddaughter Celestia Lulua Mahmud Abu Bekir died two days after slipping into the swimming pool at her home at Duta Nusantara Condominium in Kuala Lumpur.

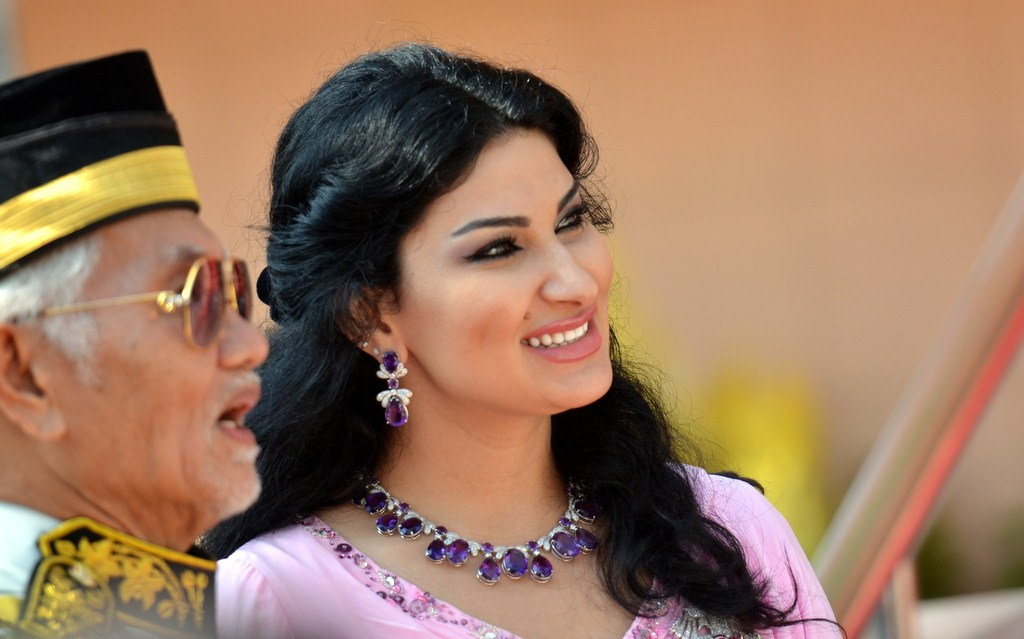
Taib Mahmud and his Syrian wife in 2011

On 18 December 2010, at the age of 74, he married again for the second time to Ragad Waleed Alkurdi, a Syrian-born woman and widow in her early 30s; however the wedding ceremony was held in private, attended only by his family members and 200 invited guests. On 8 January 2011, he was seen together with his new wife, attending a wedding reception of a former MP in Kuala Lumpur. Both held a wedding reception sometime in the middle of January, and the reception was held at the New Sarawak State Legislative Building Complex.

In 2016, the National Registration Department (NRD) was questioned for their decision to speed up Ragad Waleed Alkurdi's citizenship approval in an absurd 'record' time of just six years, while permanent residents and undocumented Sarawak natives normally would have waited for decades for the same privilege. In 2018, Ragad Kurdi Taib, along with her two children from her first marriage, were fast-tracked into fully fledged Melanaus and accorded native Bumiputera status in the state, leading to many Sarawakians' outrage.

In November 2023, Taib was named as a defendant in a suit brought by his sons against Ragad. The suit is regarding Taib's transfer of CMSB shares to Ragad.

=== Wealth ===
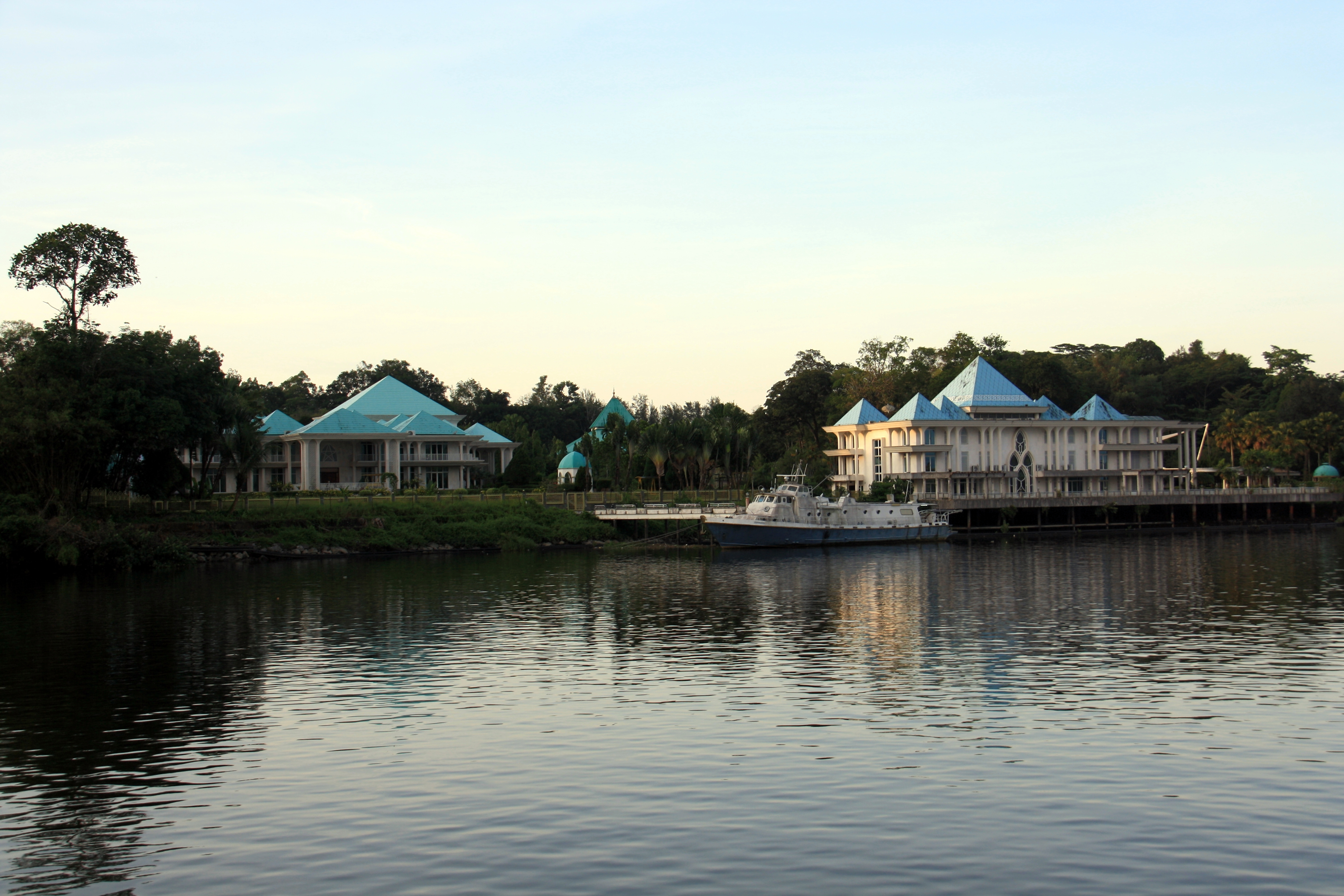
Taib Mahmud's private residence by the Sarawak River.

Taib owned a mansion in Demak Jaya which overlooks the Sarawak River. According to photos in the July to December 2006 newsletter of Naim Cendera Holdings Bhd, Taib's living room was decorated with gilt-edged European-style sofa sets. He also wore a ring with walnut-sized red gem surrounded by small diamonds. Laila Taib and her children are the majority shareholders of Sitehost Pty. Ltd., Australia, which owns the Adelaide Hilton Hotel. Taib was described as "flamboyant with expensive tastes", an avid collector of Southeast Asian betel nut paraphernalia. Taib's daughter Jamilah and family members have been establishing real property estates in Canada, the United States, and the United Kingdom. Taib Mahmud admitted that his daughter owns properties in Canada and London but he denied that he had any business interests in his daughter's properties.

Bruno Manser Fonds has since disclosed that Taib and his immediate family (his children, siblings and cousin Hamed Sepawi) have shares in more than 330 companies in Malaysia alone and more than 400 companies in total around the globe worth several billion US dollars. In September 2012, Bruno Manser Fonds estimated that Taib Mahmud's net worth was at least 15 billion US dollars. The United Kingdom, Switzerland, and Germany have since opened investigations on Taib Mahmud's wealth.

=== Hobbies and interests ===
In Taib's early days of studying in Australia, he was fond of wearing a designer suit, a hat, and a smoking pipe instead of baju melayu and songkok (traditional Malay attire). Taib later had to tone his western image down to a traditional one in order to keep in touch with his people. Taib also developed an interest in Malay literature and pantuns (Malay poetry). He was also known for being a loyal fan of P. Ramlee, a famous Malaysian singer, actor and director. Taib would occasionally sing a number of P. Ramlee songs in official functions. He would later become a patron of P. Ramlee singing contest in Kuching, Sarawak. Taib also played a major role in Bangsawan, a traditional Malay opera. Taib Mahmud wrote and published several Islamic books and other works including "Muhammad and His Mission, Islam and Utility of Mankind", "Freedom of Thought of Islam" and "Appropriate Strategy for Developing Countries in a Period of Resource Scarcity".

=== Illness and death ===
In 2023, Taib underwent a surgical procedure to address complications arising from colon cancer in Istanbul, Turkey. In January 2024, there were allegations that his wife, Ragad, forcibly removed him from the intensive care unit (ICU) of a private hospital in Kuching, although these claims were denied by both his wife and the police. It was asserted by Ragad that she had coordinated Taib's discharge with the attending doctor, who deemed him fit to travel to Cardiac Vascular Sentral in Kuala Lumpur. Despite rumours, Taib was reported to have received continued care at his residence in Kuching on 7 February 2024, before being subsequently transferred to Kuala Lumpur for further treatment. On 20 February 2024, there were social media reports suggesting a deterioration in Taib's condition, which his wife dismissed as false, saying that the accompanying photo depicted someone else.

Taib died on 21 February 2024 at 4:40am. He was 87. The Sarawak government then declared a period of mourning throughout the state for two days and the state flag was flown at half-mast. After Taib's death, a series of solemn ceremonies marked the final journey of Taib's body in the Peninsula level. Masjid Negara hosted a prayer session and tribute ceremony in its Main Lecture Hall, with dignitaries such as the Crown Princes of Perlis, Pahang and Kelantan, Tuanku Syed Faizuddin Putra Jamalullail, Tengku Hassanal Ibrahim Alam Shah and Tengku Muhammad Fakhry Petra, respectively, in attendance. Melaka Governor Mohd Ali Rustam also paid his respects. Following the ceremony, a tribute at RMAF Subang Air Base drew notable figures including Sultan Sharafuddin Idris Shah of Selangor, Sarawak Governor Wan Junaidi Tuanku Jaafar, Prime Minister Anwar Ibrahim, and Deputy Prime Minister Fadillah Yusof. From there, Taib's body was flown to Kuching, where they arrived in the evening and were taken to his residence in Demak Jaya. Upon arrival, another prayer service was held, attended by Premier Abang Johari, his deputy Awang Tengah Ali Hasan and other leaders. The following morning, the public was given the opportunity to pay their respects at the Sarawak State Legislative Assembly Complex atrium. Sultan Hassanal Bolkiah of Brunei with his son Prince Abdul Mateen were also present. Subsequently, a final prayer was held at Masjid Demak near Taib's residence. Taib was laid to rest in the family cemetery in Demak Jaya, beside his first wife Laila.

== Election results ==
Parliament of Malaysia
Year	Constituency	Candidate	Votes	Pct	Opponent(s)	Votes	Pct	Ballots cast	Majority	Turnout
1969	P124 Samarahan	Abdul Taib Mahmud (BUMIPUTERA)	5,842	55.47%	Wazir Mohamed Khan (SUPP)	2,852	27.08%	11,056	2,990	86.24%
1969	P124 Samarahan	Abdul Taib Mahmud (BUMIPUTERA)	5,842	55.47%	Abang Anwar Abang Junaidi (SNAP)	1,837	17.44%	11,056	2,990	86.24%
1974	P134 Samarahan	Abdul Taib Mahmud (PBB)		72.52%	Wazir Mohamed Khan (SNAP)		27.48%			
1978	P134 Samarahan	Abdul Taib Mahmud (PBB)	6,522	74.08%	Razali Sapang (PAJAR)	2,282	25.92%		4,240	
1982	P134 Samarahan	Abdul Taib Mahmud (PBB)	Unopposed							
1986	P157 Samarahan	Abdul Taib Mahmud (PBB)	9,814	77.88%	Wan Mohd Zain Mohdzar (IND)	2,788	22.12%	12,778	7,026	76.88%
1990	P159 Kota Samarahan	Abdul Taib Mahmud (PBB)	14,353	87.39%	Tahir Sham (PERMAS)	2,072	12.61%	16,853	12,281	71.41%
1995	P171 Kota Samarahan	Abdul Taib Mahmud (PBB)	Unopposed							
1999	P171 Kota Samarahan	Abdul Taib Mahmud (PBB)	13,307	70.72%	Zulrusdi Mohamad Hol (keADILan)	5,092	27.06%	22,433	8,215	77.45%
1999	P171 Kota Samarahan	Abdul Taib Mahmud (PBB)	13,307	70.72%	Bujang Bakar (IND)	417	2.22%	22,433	8,215	77.45%
2004	P197 Kota Samarahan	Abdul Taib Mahmud (PBB)	Unopposed							

Sarawak State Legislative Assembly
Year	Constituency	Candidate	Votes	Pct	Opponent(s)	Votes	Pct	Ballots cast	Majority	Turnout
1981	N07 Sebandi	Abdul Taib Mahmud (PBB)								
1983	N07 Sebandi	Abdul Taib Mahmud (PBB)								
1987	N07 Sebandi	Abdul Taib Mahmud (PBB)								
1991	N12 Asajaya	Abdul Taib Mahmud (PBB)	4,601	68.43%	Wan Zainal Senusi (PERMAS)	1,465	21.79%	6,801	3,136	78.48%
1991	N12 Asajaya	Abdul Taib Mahmud (PBB)	4,601	68.43%	Bujang Bakar (DAP)	617	9.18%	6,801	3,136	78.48%
1991	N12 Asajaya	Abdul Taib Mahmud (PBB)	4,601	68.43%	Mohd Adam Shah Anuar (NEGARA)	41	0.61%	6,801	3,136	78.48%
1996	N12 Asajaya	Abdul Taib Mahmud (PBB)	Unopposed							
2001	N45 Balingian	Abdul Taib Mahmud (PBB)	7,532	94.64%	Yeo Eng Choo (IND)	225	2.83%	8,071	7,307	70.84%
2001	N45 Balingian	Abdul Taib Mahmud (PBB)	7,532	94.64%	Kadri Jili (IND)	141	1.77%	8,071	7,307	70.84%
2001	N45 Balingian	Abdul Taib Mahmud (PBB)	7,532	94.64%	Alan Dunggat (IND)	61	0.76%	8,071	7,307	70.84%
2006	N51 Balingian	Abdul Taib Mahmud (PBB)	6,393	90.55%	Ibrahim Bayau (PKR)	667	9.45%	7,178	5,726	63.37%
2011	N51 Balingian	Abdul Taib Mahmud (PBB)	6,210	76.32%	Salleh Jafaruddin (IND)	1,056	12.98%	8,280	5,154	70.22%
2011	N51 Balingian	Abdul Taib Mahmud (PBB)	6,210	76.32%	Suriati Abdullah (PKR)	871	10.70%	8,280	5,154	70.22%

== Honours ==
=== Honours of Sarawak ===
- Knight Grand Commander of the Most Exalted Order of the Star of Sarawak (SBS) – Pehin Sri (2003)
- Knight Grand Commander of the Order of the Star of Hornbill Sarawak (DP) – Datuk Patinggi (1981)
- Knight Commander of the Order of the Star of Hornbill Sarawak (DA) – Datuk Amar (1974)

=== Honours of Malaysia ===
- Malaysia
  - Grand Commander of the Order of the Defender of the Realm (SMN) – Tun (2014)
  - Commander of the Order of Loyalty to the Crown of Malaysia (PSM) – Tan Sri (1989)
  - Recipient of the Malaysian Commemorative Medal (Silver) (PPM) (1965)
- Federal Territory (Malaysia)
  - Knight Grand Commander of the Order of the Territorial Crown (SUMW) – Datuk Seri Utama (2008)
- Johor
  - First Class of the Royal Family Order of Johor (DK I) (2007)
  - Knight Grand Commander of the Order of the Crown of Johor (SPMJ) – Dato'
- Kedah
  - Knight Grand Commander of the Order of Loyalty to the Royal House of Kedah (SSDK) – Dato' Seri (1991)
- Malacca
  - Knight Grand Commander of the Exalted Order of Malacca (DGSM) – Datuk Seri (1988)
- Pahang
  - 2nd Class of the Family Order of the Crown of Indra of Pahang (DK II) (2007)
  - Knight Grand Companion of the Order of Sultan Ahmad Shah of Pahang (SSAP) – Dato' Sri (1992)
- Penang
  - Knight Commander of the Order of the Defender of State (DPPN) – Dato' Seri (2005)
- Sabah
  - Grand Commander of the Order of Kinabalu (SPDK) – Datuk Seri Panglima (1999)
  - Commander of the Order of Kinabalu (PGDK) – Datuk (1972)
- Selangor
  - Knight Grand Companion of the Order of Sultan Salahuddin Abdul Aziz Shah (SSSA) – Dato' Seri (1994)
- Terengganu
  - Knight Grand Commander of the Order of the Crown of Terengganu (SPMT) – Dato' (1996)

=== Foreign honours ===
- Australia
  - Honorary Officer of the Order of Australia (AO) (2001)
- Brunei
  - 1st Class of the Family Order of Brunei (DK I) – Dato Laila Utama (2014)
  - Grand Commander of the Order of Seri Paduka Mahkota Brunei (SPMB) – Dato Seri Paduka (1989)
- Indonesia
  - Third class of the Star of Kartika Eka Paksi (1986)
- Thailand
  - Knight Grand Cross of the Order of the White Elephant (PCh) (1979)

=== Awards and recognitions ===
In April 2010, he received an honorary doctorate in Leadership from the Limkokwing University of Creative Technology and is recognised as the "Architect of Modern Sarawak" or "Father of Modern Sarawak" by the university.

In July 2010, Taib was presented with the "Lifetime achievement" by Asia HRD Congress to commemorate his contributions towards developing the human capital in Sarawak especially for the establishment of University Malaysia Sarawak (UNIMAS).

Taib also received honorary degrees from a number of universities, i.e. a Doctor of Science degree from the University of Putra Malaysia (Seri Kembangan, Malaysia) in 1992, a Doctor of the University degree from the University of Adelaide (North Terrace, Australia) in 1994, and a Doctor of Technology degree from Curtin University of Technology (Bentley, Western Australia) in 2000. Furthermore, in 1998, Taib was made the Honorary Fellow of Islamic Academy of Sciences at the Islamic Academy of Sciences (Amman, Jordan).

=== Places named after Abdul Taib Mahmud ===
Several places were named after him, including:

- Sekolah Menengah Kebangsaan (SMK) Pesantren Abdul Taib Mahmud, a secondary school in Asajaya, Samarahan
- Dewan Canselor Tun Abdul Taib Mahmud, a multipurpose hall located at the University of Technology Sarawak in Sibu
- Jambatan Tun Taib Mahmud, a bridge that connects the Jepak area with the Bintulu city center in Sarawak, Malaysia

Political offices
Preceded by Abdul Rahman Ya'kub	Chief Minister of Sarawak; 1981–2014	Succeeded by Adenan Satem
Preceded by Abang Muhammad Salahuddin	Yang di-Pertua Negeri Sarawak; 2014–2024	Succeeded by Wan Junaidi Tuanku Jaafar
