= Wendy Hutton =

New Zealand travel and food writer (1940–2018)

- Born: Wendy May Hutton; 20 November 1940; New Zealand
- Died: 23 August 2018 (aged 77); Sabah, Malaysia
- Occupation: Writer
- Known for: Writings on Southeast Asian food and travel
- Writing career
- Genres: Travel writing, food writing

Wendy May Hutton (20 November 1940 – 23 August 2018) was a New Zealand travel and food writer who lived most of her life in Southeast Asia, including almost 30 years in Sabah, Malaysia.

== Life ==
Hutton moved to Southeast Asia in 1968. After living for many years off and on in Singapore she settled in Sabah in 1989. She had been writing about Southeast Asian food since her early years in the area and continued to write about the region and its food. She died at her home in Sabah on 23 August 2018, at the age of 77.

== Publications ==
=== Food ===
- Sri Lankan Cooking (co-written with Douglas Bullis, 2016) Tuttle Publishing
- The Food of Bali (2015) Periplus Editions
- The Food of Malaysia (2015) Periplus Editions
- Green Mangoes and Lemon Grass: Southeast Asia's Best Recipes from Bangkok to Bali (2004) Tuttle Publishing
- Everyday Bento (2014) Tuttle Publishing
- Vietnamese Favorites (2014) Tuttle Publishing
- Sensational Starters and Finger Foods (2014) Tuttle Publishing
- Malaysian Favourites (2014) Tuttle Publishing
- SouthEast Asia's Best Recipes (2014) Tuttle Publishing
- Food of Australia (2012) Tuttle Publishing
- A Touch of Tropical Spice (2012) Tuttle Publishing
- A Cook's Guide to Asian Vegetables (2012) Tuttle Publishing
- Handy Pocket Guide to Tropical Fruits (2012) Tuttle Publishing
- Handy Pocket Guide to Asian Vegetables (2012) Periplus Editions
- Singapore Food (1989) first Published date 1979 by Ure Smith, Sydney, ISBN 0 7254 0518 X

=== Travel ===
- Myanmar (Burma) (co-written with David Abram and Andrew Forbes, 2013) APA Publications
- Discovering Sabah (2001) Kota Kinabalu Natural History Publications
- The insider's guide to Malaysia & Singapore (co-written with Sean Sheehan, 1998) Gregory's
- East Malaysia and Brunei (1997) Periplus Editions
