= Abdul Yakub Arbi =

Malaysian politician

Yang Berhormat Abdul Yakub Arbi MLA KMN
- ابدول ياکوب اربي

Member of the Sarawak State Legislative Assembly for Balingian
- Incumbent
- Assumed office 2016
- Preceded by: Yussibnosh Balo

Personal details
- Born: Abdul Yakub bin Arbi Sarawak
- Citizenship: Malaysian
- Party: PBB
- Other political affiliations: Barisan Nasional (till 2018); Gabungan Parti Sarawak (since 2018)
- Spouse: Abby Aysha Kho
- Occupation: Politician

Abdul Yakub bin Arbi is a Malaysian politician from PBB. He has served as the Member of the Sarawak State Legislative Assembly for Balingian since 2016.

== Election results ==
Sarawak State Legislative Assembly
Year	Constituency	Candidate	Votes	Pct.	Opponent(s)	Votes	Pct.	Ballots cast	Majority	Turnout
2016	N58 Balingian	Abdul Yakub Arbi (PBB)	4,208	77.18%	Nurzaiti Hamdan (AMANAH)	1,244	22.82%	5,552	2,964	69.69%
2021	N58 Balingian	Abdul Yakub Arbi (PBB)	4,050	71.13%	Yusuf Abdul Rahman (PSB)	1,146	20.13%	5,784	2,904	66.45%
2021	N58 Balingian	Abdul Yakub Arbi (PBB)	4,050	71.13%	Abdul Jalil Bujang (People's Justice Party (Malaysia))	498	8.75%	5,784	2,904	66.45%

== Honours ==
- Malaysia :
  - Officer of the Order of the Defender of the Realm (KMN) (2017)
