= Pantai Damai =

State constituency in Sarawak, Malaysia

Pantai Damai (N04)
Sarawak constituency

State constituency
- Legislature: Sarawak State Legislative Assembly
MLA
Vacant
- Constituency created: 1987
- First contested: 1991
- Last contested: 2026

Pantai Damai is a state constituency in Sarawak, Malaysia, that has been represented in the Sarawak State Legislative Assembly since 1991.

The state constituency was created in the 1987 redistribution and is mandated to return a single member to the Sarawak State Legislative Assembly under the first past the post voting system.

== Demographics ==
Ethnic breakdown of Pantai Damai's electorate as of 2022
1. Malay-Muslim bumiputera (88.4%)
2. Sarawak bumiputera (8.10%)
3. Chinese (2.80%)
4. Other ethnicities (0.70%)

== History ==
As of 2020, Pantai Damai has a population of 56,047 people.

=== Polling districts ===
According to the gazette issued on 31 October 2022, the Pantai Damai constituency has a total of 12 polling districts.

State constituency	Polling Districts	Code	Location
Pantai Damai (N04)	Telaga Air	193/04/01	SK Telaga Air; Dewan Selang Laut
Pantai Damai (N04)	Salak	193/04/02	SK Kpg. Salak
Pantai Damai (N04)	Temenggong	193/04/03	SK Kpg. Temenggong
Pantai Damai (N04)	Jaya Bakti	193/04/04	Surau Kpg. Jaya Bakti
Pantai Damai (N04)	Santubong	193/04/05	SK Santubong
Pantai Damai (N04)	Buntal	193/04/06	SK Kpg. Buntal; Dewan Serbagauna Sg. Lumut
Pantai Damai (N04)	Rampangi	193/04/07	SK Rampangi; SK Bandar Samariang
Pantai Damai (N04)	Sejinjang	193/04/08	SK Pasir Pandak
Pantai Damai (N04)	Astana	193/04/09	SK Kpg. Gersik; Dewan Serbaguna Panglima Seman Lama
Pantai Damai (N04)	Demak Baru	193/04/10	SMK Tun Abang Haji Openg
Pantai Damai (N04)	Semarang	193/04/11	SK Pulo; SA Al Falah Al Islamiyyah Kpg. Pulo
Pantai Damai (N04)	Bintawa	193/04/12	SK Matu Baru

=== Representation history ===
Members of the Legislative Assembly for Pantai Damai
Assembly	No	Years	Member	Party
Constituency created from Petra Jaya and Lundu
13th	N03	1991-1996	Sharifah Mordiah Tuanku Fauzi	BN (PBB)
14th	N03	1996-2001	Sharifah Mordiah Tuanku Fauzi	BN (PBB)
15th	N03	2001-2006	Abdul Rahman Junaidi	BN (PBB)
16th	N04	2006-2011	Abdul Rahman Junaidi	BN (PBB)
17th	N04	2011-2016	Abdul Rahman Junaidi	BN (PBB)
18th	N04	2016-2018	Abdul Rahman Junaidi	BN (PBB)
18th	N04	2018-2021	Abdul Rahman Junaidi	GPS (PBB)
19th	N04	2021–2026	Abdul Rahman Junaidi	GPS (PBB)

== Election results ==
Sarawak state election, 2026: Pantai Damai
Party	Candidate	Votes	%	∆%
GPS				▲
PH				▲
Total valid votes				
Total rejected ballots				
Unreturned ballots				
Turnout				
Registered electors				
Majority				

Sarawak state election, 2021: Pantai Damai
Party	Candidate	Votes	%	∆%
GPS	Abdul Rahman Junaidi	10,699	82.19	▲82.19
PSB	Mahmud Sabli	2,318	17.81	▲17.81
Total valid votes		13,017	100.00	
Total rejected ballots		180		
Unreturned ballots		101		
Turnout		13,298	64.85	▼4.96
Registered electors		20,506		
Majority		8,381	64.38	▼9.26
GPS gain from BN		Swing		?
Source(s) https://lom.agc.gov.my/ilims/upload/portal/akta/outputp/1718688/PUB687.pdf

Sarawak state election, 2016: Pantai Damai
Party	Candidate	Votes	%	∆%
BN	Abdul Rahman Junaidi	10,918	86.82	▲11.74
PAS	Zainal Abidin Yet	1,658	13.18	▲13.18
Total valid votes		12,576	100.00	
Total rejected ballots		221		
Unreturned ballots		54		
Turnout		12,851	69.81	▼1.36
Registered electors		18,409		
Majority		9,260	73.64	▲22.36
BN hold		Swing		
Source(s) "Federal Government Gazette - Notice of Contested Election, State Legislative Assembly of the State of Sarawak [P.U. (B) 190/2016]" (PDF). Attorney General's Chambers of Malaysia. 25 April 2016. Archived from the original (PDF) on 12 June 2017. "Senarai Calon yang Disahkan Layak Bertanding Pilihan Raya Dewan Undangan Negeri ke-11". Election Commission of Malaysia. 25 April 2016. Archived from the original on 25 April 2016.

Sarawak state election, 2011: Pantai Damai
Party	Candidate	Votes	%	∆%
BN	Abdul Rahman Junaidi	7,425	75.08	▲12.00
PKR	Wan Zainal Abidin Wan Senusi	2,354	23.80	▼13.12
Independent	Suhaini Selamat	111	1.12	▲1.12
Total valid votes		9,890	100.00	
Total rejected ballots		105		
Unreturned ballots		43		
Turnout		10,038	71.17	▲1.70
Registered electors		14,104		
Majority		5,071	51.28	▲25.12
BN hold		Swing		
Source(s) "Federal Government Gazette - Results of Contested Election and Statements of the Poll after the Official Addition of Votes Sarawak [P.U. (B) 245/2011]" (PDF). Attorney General's Chambers of Malaysia. 29 April 2011.

Sarawak state election, 2006: Pantai Damai
Party	Candidate	Votes	%	∆%
BN	Abdul Rahman Junaidi	5,217	63.08	▼3.58
PKR	Idris Bohari	3,053	36.92	▲6.65
Total valid votes		8,270	100.00	
Total rejected ballots		97		
Unreturned ballots		21		
Turnout		8,388	69.47	▼4.75
Registered electors		12,073		
Majority		2,164	26.16	▼10.23
BN hold		Swing		

Sarawak state election, 2001: Pantai Damai
Party	Candidate	Votes	%	∆%
BN	Abdul Rahman Junaidi	6,072	66.66	▲66.66
PKR	Husaini Hamdan	2,757	30.27	▲30.27
Independent	Norita Azmi	280	3.07	▲3.07
Total valid votes		9,109	100.00	
Total rejected ballots		88		
Unreturned ballots		24		
Turnout		9,221	74.22	▲74.22
Registered electors		12,424		
Majority		3,315	36.39	▲36.39
BN hold		Swing		

Sarawak state election, 1996: Pantai Damai
Party	Candidate	Votes	%	∆%
On the nomination day, Sharifah Mordiah Tuanku Fauzi won uncontested.
BN	Sharifah Mordiah Tuanku Fauzi			
Total valid votes				
Total rejected ballots				
Unreturned ballots				
Turnout				
Registered electors		11,273		
BN hold		Swing		

Sarawak state election, 1991: Pantai Damai
Party	Candidate	Votes	%
On the nomination day, Sharifah Mordiah Tuanku Fauzi won uncontested.
BN	Sharifah Mordiah Tuanku Fauzi		
Total valid votes			
Total rejected ballots			
Unreturned ballots			
Turnout			
Registered electors		11,011	
BN hold		Swing	
This was a new constituency created.
