= Samariang (state constituency) =

State constituency in Sarawak, Malaysia

Samariang (N07)
Sarawak constituency

State constituency
- Legislature: Sarawak State Legislative Assembly
MLA
Vacant
- Constituency created: 1968
- First contested: 1969
- Last contested: 2026

Samariang is a state constituency in Sarawak, Malaysia, that has been represented in the Sarawak State Legislative Assembly from 1969 to 1979, from 1996 to present.

The state constituency was created in the 1968 redistribution and is mandated to return a single member to the Sarawak State Legislative Assembly under the first past the post voting system.

== Demographics ==
Ethnic breakdown of Samariang's electorate as of 2022
1. Malay-Muslim bumiputera (89.5%)
2. Sarawak bumiputera (8.20%)
3. Chinese (1.50%)
4. Other ethnicities (0.80%)

== History ==
It was abolished in 1979 after it was redistributed. It was re-created in 1996.

As of 2020, Samariang has a population of 45,085 people.

=== Polling districts ===
According to the gazette issued on 31 October 2022, the Samariang constituency has a total of 8 polling districts.

State constituency	Polling Districts	Code	Location
Samariang (N07)	Samariang	194/07/01	SK Samariang Kpg. Samariang Batu; Surau Darul Amin Samariang Jaya, Fasa 2
Samariang (N07)	Lintang	194/07/02	SK Encik Buyong
Samariang (N07)	Kandis	194/07/03	Kolej Datuk Patinggi Abang Abdillah
Samariang (N07)	Semerah Padi	194/07/04	SMK Semerah Padi
Samariang (N07)	Sukma	194/07/05	SK Madrasah Datuk Hj Abdul Kadir Hasan; Dewan Temenggong, Kpg. Semariang Baru Fasa III
Samariang (N07)	Kampong Tunku	194/07/06	Dewan Masyarakat Sg. Lumut; SK Rancangan Perumahan Rakyat PPR
Samariang (N07)	Bedil	194/07/07	Dewan Masyarakat Baru Kpg. Lintang
Samariang (N07)	Astana Lot	194/07/08	Dewan SK Encik Buyong

=== Representation history ===
Members of the Legislative Assembly for Samariang
Assembly	No	Years	Member	Party
Constituency created
Semariang
8th	N05	1970-1973	Ajibah Abol	BUMIPUTERA
8th	N05	1973-1974	Ajibah Abol	BN (PBB)
9th	N05	1974–1976	Ajibah Abol	BN (PBB)
9th	N05	1976-1979	Hafsah Harun	BN (PBB)
Constituency abolished, split into Lundu and Petra Jaya
Constituency re-created from Pantai Damai and Tupong
Samariang
14th	N07	1996-2001	Dona Babel	BN (PBB)
15th	N07	2001-2006	Sharifah Mordiah Tuanku Fauzi	BN (PBB)
16th	N07	2006-2011	Sharifah Hasidah Sayeed Aman Ghazali	BN (PBB)
17th	N07	2011–2016	Sharifah Hasidah Sayeed Aman Ghazali	BN (PBB)
18th	N07	2016–2018	Sharifah Hasidah Sayeed Aman Ghazali	BN (PBB)
18th	N07	2018-2021	Sharifah Hasidah Sayeed Aman Ghazali	GPS (PBB)
19th	N07	2021–2026	Sharifah Hasidah Sayeed Aman Ghazali	GPS (PBB)

== Election results ==
Sarawak state election, 2026
Party	Candidate	Votes	%	∆%
GPS				▲
PH				▲
PN				▲
Total valid votes				
Total rejected ballots				
Unreturned ballots				
Turnout				
Registered electors				
Majority				

Sarawak state election, 2021
Party	Candidate	Votes	%	∆%
GPS	Sharifah Hasidah Sayeed Aman Ghazali	11,354	87.61	▲87.61
Amanah	Abg Abdul Halil Abg Laili	1,071	8.26	▼8.39
Parti Sedar Rakyat Sarawak	Othman Abdillah	535	4.13	▲4.13
Total valid votes		12,960	100.00	
Total rejected ballots		121		
Unreturned ballots		102		
Turnout		13,183	61.71	▼6.22
Registered electors		21,363		
Majority		10,283	79.40	▲15.89
GPS gain from BN		Swing		?
Source(s) https://lom.agc.gov.my/ilims/upload/portal/akta/outputp/1718688/PUB687.pdf

Sarawak state election, 2016
Party	Candidate	Votes	%	∆%
BN	Sharifah Hasidah Sayeed Aman Ghazali	9,795	80.16	▲4.51
PAS	Yusof Assidiqqi Ahmad Sharkawi	2,035	16.65	▼7.70
Amanah	Nani Sahari	389	3.19	▲3.19
Total valid votes		12,219	100.00	
Total rejected ballots		108		
Unreturned ballots		70		
Turnout		12,397	67.93	▲0.38
Registered electors		18,250		
Majority		7,760	63.51	▲12.18
BN hold		Swing		
Source(s) "Federal Government Gazette - Notice of Contested Election, State Legislative Assembly of the State of Sarawak [P.U. (B) 190/2016]" (PDF). Attorney General's Chambers of Malaysia. 25 April 2016. "Senarai Calon yang Disahkan Layak Bertanding Pilihan Raya Dewan Undangan Negeri ke-11". Election Commission of Malaysia. 25 April 2016. Archived from the original on 25 April 2016.

Sarawak state election, 2011
Party	Candidate	Votes	%	∆%
BN	Sharifah Hasidah Sayeed Aman Ghazali	8,008	75.65	▲10.56
PKR	Zulrusdi Mohamad Hol	2,577	24.35	▼10.56
Total valid votes		10,585	100.00	
Total rejected ballots		144		
Unreturned ballots		40		
Turnout		10,769	67.55	▲5.16
Registered electors		15,942		
Majority		5,431	51.33	▲21.15
BN hold		Swing		
Source(s) "Federal Government Gazette - Results of Contested Election and Statements of the Poll after the Official Addition of Votes Sarawak [P.U. (B) 245/2011]" (PDF). Attorney General's Chambers of Malaysia. 29 April 2011.

Sarawak state election, 2006
Party	Candidate	Votes	%	∆%
BN	Sharifah Hasidah Sayeed Aman Ghazali	5,365	65.09	▲0.38
PKR	Wan Zainal Abidin Wan Senusi	2,877	34.91	▲9.28
Total valid votes		8,242	100.00	
Total rejected ballots		88		
Unreturned ballots		92		
Turnout		8,422	62.39	▼7.16
Registered electors		13,498		
Majority		2,488	30.18	▼8.89
BN hold		Swing		

Sarawak state election, 2001
Party	Candidate	Votes	%	∆%
BN	Sharifah Mordiah Tuanku Fauzi	5,460	64.71	▼6.22
PKR	Wan Ariffin Wan Senusi	2,163	25.63	▲25.63
PAS	Mohamad Shokri Ahmad Fauzi	468	5.55	▲5.55
Independent	Arifin Abang Anuar	347	4.11	▲4.11
Total valid votes		8,438	100.00	
Total rejected ballots		93		
Unreturned ballots		78		
Turnout		8,609	69.55	▲8.34
Registered electors		12,378		
Majority		3,297	39.07	▼2.81
BN hold		Swing		

Sarawak state election, 1996
Party	Candidate	Votes	%	∆%
BN	Dona Babel	4,170	70.93	
Independent	Mariam Musa	1,709	29.07	
Total valid votes		5,879	100.00	
Total rejected ballots		134		
Unreturned ballots		131		
Turnout		6,144	61.21	
Registered electors		10,037		
Majority		2,461	41.88	
BN hold		Swing		

Sarawak state by-election, July 1976 Upon the death of incumbent, Ajibah Abol
Party	Candidate	Votes	%	∆%
On the nomination day, Hafsah Harun won uncontested.
BN	Hafsah Harun			
Total valid votes				
Total rejected ballots				
Unreturned ballots				
Turnout				
Registered electors				
BN hold		Swing		

Sarawak state election, 1974: Semariang
Party	Candidate	Votes	%	∆%
BN	Ajibah Abol	4,921	78.82	▲24.34
SNAP	Abang Abdul Rahin Openg	1,147	18.37	▲1.29
Independent	Awang Wal Awang Abu	175	2.80	▼6.41
Total valid votes		6,243	100.00	
Total rejected ballots		462		
Unreturned ballots		0		
Turnout		6,705	78.35	▼6.38
Registered electors		8,558		
Majority		3,774	60.42	▲22.32
BN gain from PBB		Swing		?

Sarawak state election, 1969: Semariang
Party	Candidate	Votes	%	∆%
PBB	Ajibah Abol	3,233	54.48	▲54.48
SUPP	Abdul Kadir Merican	971	16.36	▲16.36
Independent	Shukri Mahidi	954	16.08	▲16.08
SNAP	Abang Bueng Abang Amin	526	8.86	▲8.86
Independent	Ben Jomel	250	4.21	▲4.21
Total valid votes		5,934	100.00	
Total rejected ballots		401		
Unreturned ballots		0		
Turnout		6,335	84.73	▲84.73
Registered electors		7,477		
Majority		2,262	38.10	▲38.10
This was a new constituency created.
