= Rubiah Wang =

Malaysian politician

Yang Berhormat Datuk Rubiah Wang PMW MP
- رابعة بنت واڠ
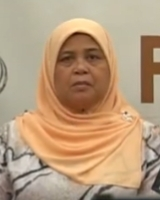

Deputy Minister of Rural and Regional Development
- Incumbent
- Assumed office 10 December 2022
- Monarchs: Abdullah (2022–2024); Ibrahim Iskandar (since 2024)
- Prime Minister: Anwar Ibrahim
- Minister: Ahmad Zahid Hamidi
- Preceded by: Abdul Rahman Mohamad (Deputy Minister of Rural Development I); Hasbi Habibollah (Deputy Minister of Rural Development II)
- Constituency: Kota Samarahan

Member of the Malaysian Parliament for Kota Samarahan
- Incumbent
- Assumed office 5 May 2013
- Preceded by: Sulaiman Abdul Rahman Taib (BN–PBB)
- Majority: 17,401 (2013); 16,992 (2018); 29,445 (2022)

Personal details
- Born: Rubiah binti Wang
- Party: Parti Pesaka Bumiputera Bersatu (PBB)
- Other political affiliations: Barisan Nasional (BN) (–2018); Gabungan Parti Sarawak (GPS) (since 2018)
- Occupation: Politician
- Profession: Teacher

Rubiah binti Wang (Jawi: رابعة بنت واڠ) is a Malaysian politician, former civil servant and former educator who has served as the Deputy Minister of Rural and Regional Development in the Unity Government administration under Prime Minister Anwar Ibrahim and Minister Ahmad Zahid Hamidi since December 2022 and the Member of Parliament (MP) for Kota Samarahan since May 2013. She is a member of the Parti Pesaka Bumiputera Bersatu (PBB), a component party of the Gabungan Parti Sarawak (GPS) and formerly Barisan Nasional (BN) coalition.

== Background ==
Rubiah Wang graduated from Universiti Kebangsaan Malaysia (UKM) with a Bachelor in Social Sciences. She began her career as a teacher at SMK Openg from 1992 to 1994. She then worked as a Sarawak Administrative Officer until 2006, before being promoted to the position of District Officer of Asajaya in 2007. In 2013, she resigned and participated in the 13th Malaysian General Election, running for the Kota Samarahan constituency.

== Political career ==
She was first elected to Parliament in the 2013 general election after winning the Kota Samarahan federal seat. She was reelected as the MP for Kota Samarahan in the 2018 and 2022 general elections.

== Election results ==
Parliament of Malaysia
Year	Constituency	Candidate	Votes	Pct	Opponent(s)	Votes	Pct	Ballots cast	Majority	Turnout
2013	P197 Kota Samarahan	Rubiah Wang (PBB)	24,202	78.06%	Abang Ahmad Kerdee Abang Masagus (PAS)	6,801	21.94%	31,612	17,401	82.85%
2018	P197 Kota Samarahan	Rubiah Wang (PBB)	25,070	69.90%	Sopian Julaihi (AMANAH)	8,078	22.52%	36,551	16,992	78.94%
2018	P197 Kota Samarahan	Rubiah Wang (PBB)	25,070	69.90%	Zulkipli Ramzi (PAS)	2,719	7.58%	36,551	16,992	78.94%
2022	P197 Kota Samarahan	Rubiah Wang (PBB)	42,278	76.71%	Abg Abdul Halil Abg Naili (AMANAH)	12,833	23.29%	56,238	29,445	67.02%

== Honours ==
=== Honours of Malaysia ===
- Malaysia
  - Recipient of the 17th Yang di-Pertuan Agong Installation Medal (2024)
- Federal Territory (Malaysia)
  - Commander of the Order of the Territorial Crown (PMW) – Datuk (2022)
- Sarawak
  - Gold Medal of the Sarawak Independence Diamond Jubilee Medal (2023)
