= Borneo Fashion Week =

Annual fashion event in Malaysia

- Genre: Clothing and fashion exhibitions
- Frequency: Annually
- Locations: Kuching, Sarawak; Kota Kinabalu, Sabah
- Country: Malaysia
- Inaugurated: 2017
- Previous event: 4–6 October 2019
- Next event: TBA
- Website: borneofashionweek.com.my

Borneo Fashion Week (BFW) is a fashion event in Borneo which is held annually. BFW is founded by Stephanie Alcantara.

BFW is organised by Borneo Ads Management. The last edition of BFW was held for the first time in Kota Kinabalu, Sabah between 4 and 6 October 2019.

== Locations ==
Year	Venue	Host city
2017	Borneo 744 Bintawa	Kuching, Sarawak
2018	Pullman Hotel and Cove55	Kuching, Sarawak
2019	Oceanus Waterfront Mall	Kota Kinabalu, Sabah

== List of winners ==
BFW also incorporates award ceremony to acknowledge outstanding designers and models. The list of winners for previous editions are as following:

2017

Category	Winner (s)	Notes
Emerging Fashion Designer	Yacub Taha (Yacutha)	Also recipient of Limkokwing Fashion Design Diploma Scholarship
Emerging Fashion Designer	Azhar Zainal (AZ Brothers)	Also recipient of Limkokwing Fashion Design Degree Scholarship
Most Promising Sarawakian Designer	Datuk Raymond Jolly and Aaron G. Von Jolly (Von Jolly Couture)	

2018

Category	Winner (s)	Notes
Designer in the Spotlight	Najla Shoes	
Model of the Year – Male	Zachary Puung Li Xin	
Model of the Year – Female	Vanizha Vasantha Nathan	
Emerging Borneo Designer of the Year	Kumang & Co	
Most Promising Designer of the Year	JK Homme	Also recipient of Limkokwing Fashion Design Diploma Scholarship
Most Promising Designer of the Year	Michael Ooi	Also recipient of Limkokwing Fashion Design Degree Scholarship
Designer of the Year	Rozie Khan Couture	

2019

Category	Winner (s)	Notes
Designer Of The Year	Keith Sim	
Emerging Borneo Designer Of The Year	Nasha Prive	
Most Promising Designer	Abdul Latip Mohti (Latip’s Collections)	
