= Douglas Bullis =

American author

Douglas Bullis is an American author. His work includes 100 Artists of the West Coast.

== Bibliography ==
- Remembrances of Things to Come Publisher: Atelier Books, Ltd. Co. September 29, 2011, 152 pages
- Indigo (2008)
- AmericaAmerica When Will You See ISBN 9780970663269. Publisher: Atelier Books, Ltd. Co. Published February 11, 2008, Pages: 52
- 100 Artists of the West Coast, Schiffer Publishing, Atglen, Pennsylvania (2006)
- Mahavamsa: The Great Chronicle of Sri Lanka (editor and commentary) 1999 Jain Publishing Company. ISBN 9780895819062
- Culture Shock Succeed in Business Sri Lanka with Hiru Biljani
- Sri Lankan Cooking (with Wendy Hutton)
- The Longest Hajj: The Journeys of Ibn Battuta (2000)
- Fashion Asia (September 2000)
- Doing Business in Today's India January 1998, Praeger ISBN 978-1-56720-136-9
- Preparing for Electronic Commerce in Asia Publisher ABC-CLIO Published February 28, 1999 ISBN 9781567202069 Subject Management & Business: General, published in Westport by Greenwood Press
- Sri Lanka (1998)
- Selling to India's Consumer Market (1997)
- Write a Winning Business Plan 1996
- Crystals: the science, mystery and lore
- The Chania Town News: Timeless People in a Changing Time (2001)
- California fashion designers: art and style (1987)
- Preparing for Electronic Commerce in Asia
- Not by Bread Alone: The Thousand Years of the French Revolution (1989)
- 50 West Coast Artists: A Critical Selection of Painters... with Henry Hopkins (1981)
- A Soul You Can See: The Life and Thinking of Chief Minister Datuk Patinggi Tan Sri Haji Abdul Taib Mahmud of Sarawak Encorp Group Sdn Bhd, (1996) - Prime ministers - 248 pages
- Why New Mexicans Love New Mexico with Diane Freburg (Editor)
- Morning Light by Nancy King, Douglas Bullis (Editor)

== Articles ==
- The Longest Hajj: The Journeys of Ibn Battuta — Saudi Aramco World article by Douglas Bullis (July/August 2000).
