= Kota Samarahan (federal constituency) =

Federal constituency of Sarawak, Malaysia

Kota Samarahan (P197)
Sarawak constituency

Federal constituency
- Legislature: Dewan Rakyat
- MP: Rubiah Wang; GPS
- Constituency created: 1987
- First contested: 1990
- Last contested: 2022

Demographics
- Population (2020): 158,521
- Electors (2022): 82,909
- Area (km²): 745
- Pop. density (per km²): 212.8

Kota Samarahan is a federal constituency in Samarahan Division (Asajaya District and Samarahan District), Serian Division (Serian District) and Kuching Division (Kuching District), Sarawak, Malaysia, that has been represented in the Dewan Rakyat since 1990.

The federal constituency was created in the 1987 redistribution and is mandated to return a single member to the Dewan Rakyat under the first past the post voting system.

== Demographics ==
https://ge15.orientaldaily.com.my/seats/sarawak/p

Ethnic breakdown of Kota Samarahan's electorate as of 2022
1. Malay-Muslim Bumiputera (58.5%)
2. Sarawak Bumiputera (27.3%)
3. Chinese (13.3%)
4. Other ethnicities (0.90%)

As of 2020, Kota Samarahan has a population of 158,521 people.

Age breakdown of Kota Samarahan's electorate as of 2022
1. 18-20 (8.39%)
2. 21-29 (25.2%)
3. 30-39 (23.7%)
4. 40-49 (17.6%)
5. 50-59 (12.3%)
6. 60-69 (7.79%)
7. 70-79 (3.62%)
8. 80-89 (1.16%)
9. above 90 (0.21%)
Gender breakdown of Kota Samarahan's electorate as of 2022
1. Male (50.6%)
2. Female (49.4%)

== History ==
=== Polling districts ===
According to the gazette issued on 31 October 2022, the Kota Samarahan constituency has a total of 31 polling districts.

State constituency	Polling Districts	Code	Location
Asajaya（N15）	Beliong	197/15/01	SK Beliong
Asajaya（N15）	Tanjung Apong	197/15/02	SK Tanjung Apong; Dewan Kpg. Sri Tajo
Asajaya（N15）	Tambirat	197/15/03	SMK Asajaya No. 2
Asajaya（N15）	Tambey	197/15/04	SK Tambey
Asajaya（N15）	Sui	197/15/05	(Ruang B) Dewan Serbaguna Kpg. Semawang
Asajaya（N15）	Sambir	197/15/06	SK Sambir
Asajaya（N15）	Sebandi Matang	197/15/07	SK Sebandi Matang
Asajaya（N15）	Sebandi Ulu	197/15/08	SK Sebandi Ulu
Asajaya（N15）	Subi	197/15/09	SJK (C) Chung Hua Sambir
Asajaya（N15）	Moyan	197/15/10	SK Moyan Laut
Asajaya（N15）	Reba	197/15/11	SK Rebak
Asajaya（N15）	Moyan Ulu	197/15/12	Dewan Kpg. Moyan Ulu
Asajaya（N15）	Moyan Ledang	197/15/13	Dewan Kpg. Moyan Ledang
Asajaya（N15）	Serpan	197/15/14	SK Serpan
Asajaya（N15）	Serpan Ulu	197/15/15	Dewan Kpg. Serpan Ulu
Asajaya（N15）	Asajaya	197/15/16	SK Asajaya Ulu
Asajaya（N15）	Asajaya Laut	197/15/17	SK Asajaya Laut; Dewan Serbaguna Kampung Asajaya Tengah
Asajaya（N15）	Tebun	197/15/18	SK Sampun Tebun
Asajaya（N15）	Sampum	197/15/19	Balai Raya Sampun Gerunggang
Muara Tuang (N16)	Empila	197/16/01	Bilik Gerakan ERT Kpg. Nakong; SK Kpg. Mang; SK Kpg. Melayu; Dewan Serbaguna Kpg. Bangka Semong; Dewan Serbaguna Kpg. Sg. Mata; Surau Kpg. Naie Baru; Dewan Serbaguna Kpg Sg Mata; Dewan Sri Villa Kpg. Empila; SK Niup; Dewan Serbaguna Kpg. Tanjung Parang; (Ruang A) Dewan Serbaguna Kpg. Semawang; SK Kg Tanjung Tuang
Muara Tuang (N16)	Tanju	197/16/02	SJK (C) Chung Hua Beliong
Muara Tuang (N16)	Batu Blat	197/16/03	SK Kpg. Baru
Muara Tuang (N16)	Tuang	197/16/04	SK Dato Traoh Muara Tuang; Dewan Kpg. Muara Tuang; SK Dato Mohd Musa; Dewan Sri Payong Kpg. Endap; SK Pinang; SK Meranek; SK Kampung Rembus
Muara Tuang (N16)	Semaran	197/16/05	SK Tanah Merah; Balai Raya Kpg. Segenam; Dewan Serbaguna Kpg. Raeh; TADIKA KEMAS Kpg. Soh; SK Gemang; SJK (C) Chung Hua Batu 29 Jln. Kuching / Serian
Muara Tuang (N16)	Ladang Samarahan	197/16/06	SK Lubok Antu / Reban; SK Pati; SK Samarahan Estate; Dewan Kpg. Seniawan; SK Plaman Baki / Menaul; Balairaya Kpg. Tian Mawang; Balairaya Kpg. Murud Plaman
Muara Tuang (N16)	Melaban	197/15/07	Dewan Kpg. Sebayor; Balai Raya Kpg. Melaban (Ruang A); Balai Raya Kpg. Melaban (Ruang B); SK Plaie D C; SK St Michael
Stakan (N17)	Merdang	197/17/01	SK Binyu; Dewan Kpg. Merdang Gayam; SMK Muara Tuang; Balairaya Sg. Empit; SK Merdang; SJK (C) Chung Hua Sg. Jernang
Stakan (N17)	Quop	197/17/02	SK St. James Quop
Stakan (N17)	Sidanu	197/17/03	SMK Penrissen; Dewan Sri Lestari Kpg. Sri Arjuna
Stakan (N17)	Pengkalan Kuap	197/17/04	SK Jalan Muara Tuang
Stakan (N17)	Stakan	197/17/05	SMK Wira Penrissen; Dewan Kpg. Stakan

=== Representation history ===
Members of Parliament for Kota Samarahan
Parliament	No	Years	Member	Party	Vote Share
Constituency created from Samarahan, Padawan and Serian
8th	P159	1990-1995	Abdul Taib Mahmud (عبدالطيب محمود)	BN (PBB)	14,353; 87.39%
9th	P171	1995-1999	Abdul Taib Mahmud (عبدالطيب محمود)	BN (PBB)	Uncontested
10th	P171	1999-2004	Abdul Taib Mahmud (عبدالطيب محمود)	BN (PBB)	13,307; 70.72%
11th	P197	2004-2008	Abdul Taib Mahmud (عبدالطيب محمود)	BN (PBB)	Uncontested
12th	P197	2008-2013	Sulaiman Abdul Rahman Abdul Taib (سليمان عبدالرحمٰن عبدالطيب)	BN (PBB)	15,559; 75.51%
13th	P197	2013-2018	Rubiah Wang (ربيعة واڠ)	BN (PBB)	24,202; 78.06%
14th	P197	2018	Rubiah Wang (ربيعة واڠ)	BN (PBB)	25,070; 69.90%
14th	P197	2018-2022	Rubiah Wang (ربيعة واڠ)	GPS (PBB)	25,070; 69.90%
15th	P197	2022–present	Rubiah Wang (ربيعة واڠ)	GPS (PBB)	56,211; 79.99%

=== State constituency ===
Parliamentary constituency	State constituency					
Parliamentary constituency	1969–1978	1978–1990	1990–1999	1999–2008	2008–2016	2016−present
Kota Samarahan			Asajaya			
Kota Samarahan			Muara Tuang			
Kota Samarahan						Stakan

=== Historical boundaries ===
State Constituency	Area			
State Constituency	1987	1996	2005	2015
Asajaya	Asajaya; Beliong; Moyan; Sebandi; Tembirat		Beliong; Kampung Melayu Kota Samarahan; Moyan; Sebandi; Tembirat	Asajaya; Beliong; Moyan; Sebandi; Tembirat
Muara Tuang	Kampung Melayu Kota Samarahan; Kampung Rembus; Kampung Sungai Menaul; Kota Samarahan; Muara Tuang		Kota Samarahan; Muara Tuang; Pengkalan Kuap; Semenggoh; Stakan	Kampung Melayu Kota Samarahan; Kampung Rembus; Kampung Sungai Menaul; Kota Samarahan; Muara Tuang
Stakan				Kampung Binyu; Pengkalan Kuap; Samarindah; Semenggoh; Stakan

=== Current state assembly members ===
No.	State Constituency	Member	Coalition (Party)
N15	Asajaya	Abdul Karim Rahman Hamzah	GPS (PBB)
N16	Muara Tuang	Idris Buang	GPS (PBB)
N17	Stakan	Hamzah Brahim	GPS (PBB)

=== Local governments & postcodes ===
No.	State Constituency	Local Government	Postcode
N15	Asajaya	Kota Samarahan Municipal Council	93250, 93350 Kuching; 94200 Siburan; 94300 Kota Samarahan; 94600 Asajaya; 94700 Serian
N16	Muara Tuang	Padawan Municipal Council (Kampung Endap area); Kota Samarahan Municipal Council; Serian District Council (Kampung Saul and Kampung Menaul areas)	93250, 93350 Kuching; 94200 Siburan; 94300 Kota Samarahan; 94600 Asajaya; 94700 Serian
N17	Stakan	Padawan Municipal Council (Kampung Kuap and Semenggoh areas); Kota Samarahan Municipal Council	93250, 93350 Kuching; 94200 Siburan; 94300 Kota Samarahan; 94600 Asajaya; 94700 Serian

== Election results ==
Malaysian general election, 2022
Party	Candidate	Votes	%	∆%
GPS	Rubiah Wang	56,211	79.99	▲79.99
PH	Abg Abdul Halil Abg Naili	14,061	20.01	▲20.01
Total valid votes		70,272	100.00	
Total rejected ballots		892		
Unreturned ballots		235		
Turnout		71,399	86.83	▲7.89
Registered electors		82,229		
Majority		42,150	59.98	▲12.60
GPS gain from BN		Swing		?
Source(s) https://lom.agc.gov.my/ilims/upload/portal/akta/outputp/1753265/PARLIMEN%20SARAWAK%20(PUB%20620).pdf

Malaysian general election, 2018
Party	Candidate	Votes	%	∆%
BN	Rubiah Wang	25,070	69.90	▼8.16
PKR	Sopian Julaihi	8,078	22.52	▲22.52
PAS	Zulkipli Ramzi	2,719	7.58	▼14.36
Total valid votes		35,867	100.00	
Total rejected ballots		431		
Unreturned ballots		253		
Turnout		36,551	78.94	▼3.91
Registered electors		46,300		
Majority		16,992	47.38	▼8.74
BN hold		Swing		
Source(s) "His Majesty's Government Gazette - Notice of Contested Election, Parliament for the State of Sarawak [P.U. (B) 247/2018]" (PDF). Attorney General's Chambers of Malaysia. 3 May 2018. "Federal Government Gazette - Results of Contested Election and Statements of the Poll after the Official Addition of Votes, Parliamentary Constituencies for the State of Sarawak [P.U. (B) 321/2018]" (PDF). Attorney General's Chambers of Malaysia. 28 May 2018. Archived from the original (PDF) on 2019-12-29.

Malaysian general election, 2013
Party	Candidate	Votes	%	∆%
BN	Rubiah Wang	24,202	78.06	▲2.55
PAS	Abang Ahmad Kerdee Abang Masagus	6,801	21.94	▲21.94
Total valid votes		31,003	100.00	
Total rejected ballots		528		
Unreturned ballots		81		
Turnout		31,612	82.85	▲7.71
Registered electors		38,158		
Majority		17,401	56.12	▲0.74
BN hold		Swing		
Source(s) "Federal Government Gazette - Notice of Contested Election, Parliament for the State of Sarawak [P.U. (B) 184/2013]" (PDF). Attorney General's Chambers of Malaysia. 26 April 2013. Archived from the original (PDF) on 2018-09-30. "Federal Government Gazette - Results of Contested Election and Statements of the Poll after the Official Addition of Votes, Parliamentary Constituencies for the State of Sarawak [P.U. (B) 225/2013]" (PDF). Attorney General's Chambers of Malaysia. 22 May 2013. Archived from the original (PDF) on 2018-09-30.

Malaysian general election, 2008
Party	Candidate	Votes	%	∆%
BN	Sulaiman Abdul Rahman Abdul Taib	15,559	75.51	▲75.51
PKR	Hussain Abang Apok	4,148	20.13	▲20.13
Independent	Awg Bakar Awg Daud	898	4.36	▲4.36
Total valid votes		20,605	100.00	
Total rejected ballots		449		
Unreturned ballots		374		
Turnout		21,428	75.14	
Registered electors		28,517		
Majority		11,411	55.38	
BN hold		Swing		

Malaysian general election, 2004
Party	Candidate	Votes	%	∆%
On the nomination day, Abdul Taib Mahmud won uncontested.
BN	Abdul Taib Mahmud			
Total valid votes			100.00	
Total rejected ballots				
Unreturned ballots				
Turnout				
Registered electors		27,268		
Majority				
BN hold		Swing		
Source(s) https://github.com/TindakMalaysia/HISTORICAL-ELECTION-RESULTS/blob/main/2004-ELECTION-RESULTS/MALAYSIA_2004_PARLIAMENT_RESULTS.csv

Malaysian general election, 1999
Party	Candidate	Votes	%	∆%
BN	Abdul Taib Mahmud	13,307	70.72	▲70.72
PKR	Zulrusdi Mohamad Hol	5,092	27.06	▲27.06
Independent	Bujang Bakar	417	2.22	
Total valid votes		18,816	100.00	
Total rejected ballots		411		
Unreturned ballots		3,206		
Turnout		22,433	77.45	
Registered electors		28,962		
Majority		8,215	43.66	
BN hold		Swing		
Source(s) https://github.com/TindakMalaysia/HISTORICAL-ELECTION-RESULTS/blob/main/1999-ELECTION-RESULTS/MALAYSIA_1999_PARLIAMENT_RESULTS.csv

Malaysian general election, 1995
Party	Candidate	Votes	%	∆%
On the nomination day, Abdul Taib Mahmud won uncontested.
BN	Abdul Taib Mahmud			
Total valid votes			100.00	
Total rejected ballots				
Unreturned ballots				
Turnout				
Registered electors		27,354		
Majority				
BN hold		Swing		
Source(s) https://github.com/TindakMalaysia/HISTORICAL-ELECTION-RESULTS/blob/main/1995-ELECTION-RESULTS/MALAYSIA_1995_PARLIAMENT_RESULTS.csv

Malaysian general election, 1990
Party	Candidate	Votes	%
BN	Abdul Taib Mahmud	14,353	87.39
PERMAS	Tahir Sham	2,072	12.61
Total valid votes		16,425	100.00
Total rejected ballots		428	
Unreturned ballots		0	
Turnout		16,853	71.41
Registered electors		23,599	
Majority		12,281	74.78
This was a new constituency created.
