= Torstein Dale Sjøtveit =

Norwegian business executive (born 1955)

Torstein Dale Sjotveit
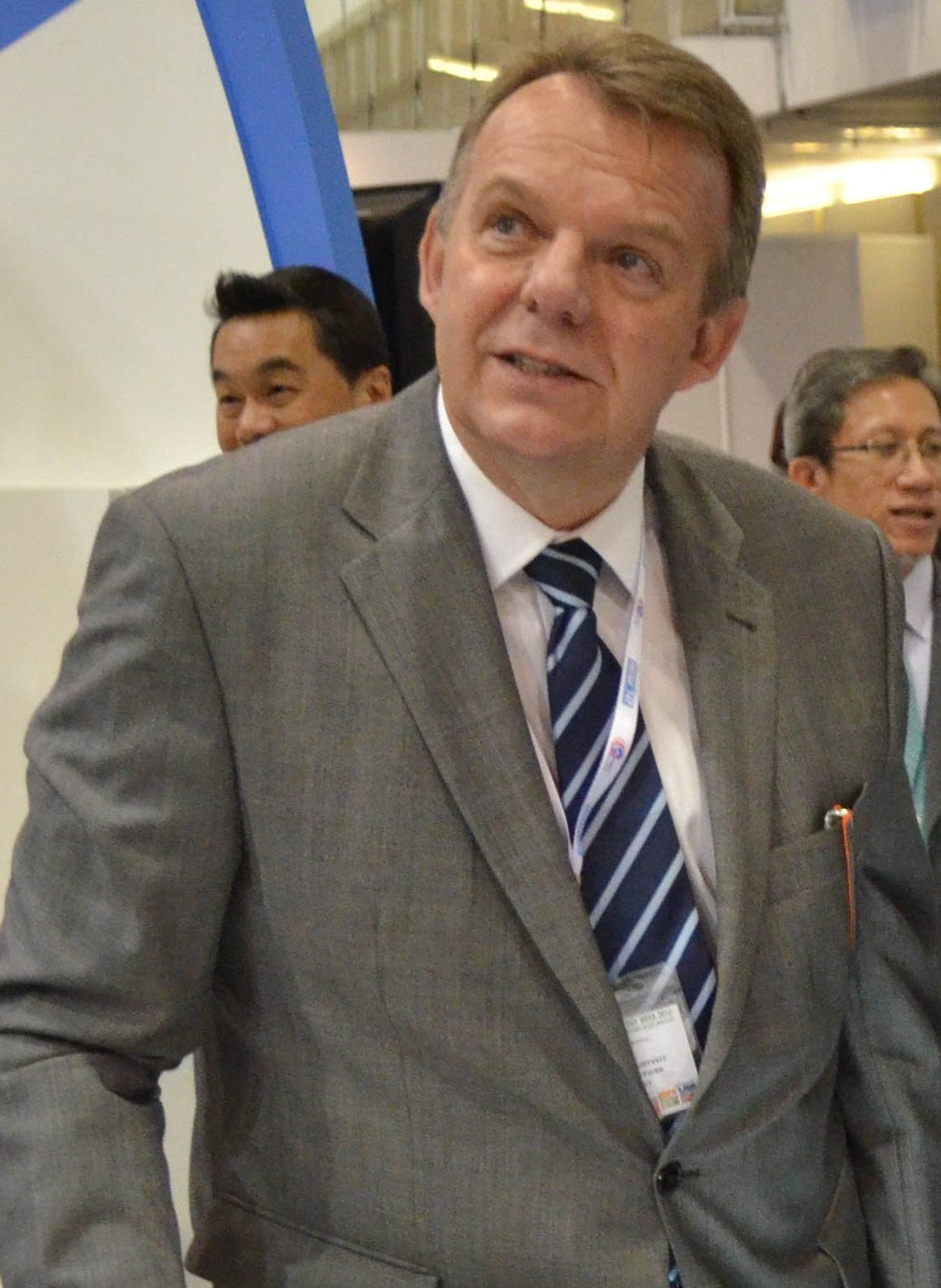
- Torstein Dale Sjotveit in 2012
- Born: 10 May 1955 (age 69); Miland, Norway
- Occupation: Chief executive officer of Sarawak Energy

Torstein Dale Sjøtveit (born 10 May 1955) is a Norwegian business executive. Torstein is currently executive chairman of Freyr AS, a Norwegian company aiming at establishing a 32 GWh Giga factory for lithium battery cells in Mo I Rana Norway.

He served AS the chief executive officer (CEO) of East Malaysia-based Sarawak Energy (SEB), a position he has held from November 2009 until November 2016. He led the state-owned, fully integrated utility company, responsible for development, generation, transmission, distribution and retail of electricity, to serve more than 500,000 customers throughout the State of Sarawak.

Prior to joining Sarawak Energy, Torstein was the president and CEO of Europe's biggest shipbuilding group, Aker Yards ASA/STX Europe ASA.

He was awarded the Pingat Panglima Gemilang Bintang Kenyalang (P.G.B.K) (Grand Commander of the Order of the Star of Hornbill Sarawak), by the Governor of Sarawak, in recognition of his contributions to Sarawak. This award carries the title of Datuk.

Torstein has also been a Director on the Board of the International Hydropower Association since 2011.

In the period since Torstein commenced as CEO, Sarawak Energy has experienced significant business growth, with:

- sales of electricity (volume), up 120 per cent,
- revenue, up 70 per cent; and
- profit before tax, up by 75 per cent.

Over the same period, the rate of power theft in Sarawak has been reduced by half, and Sarawak Energy's distribution network has the best ever performance in the System Average Interruption Duration Index (SAIDI), moving from an average duration of 419 minutes per year, per customer in 2002, to 168 minutes per year, per customer in 2013.

== Early life ==
Torstein Dale Sjøtveit was born in Miland, a small village 12 km outside the small industrial town of Rjukan, in Norway. His interest in industrial development can be attributed to the transformative impact of hydropower upon his hometown of Rjukan, turning it from a remote rural area located in a narrow valley just under Gaustatoppen – one of Norway's highest mountains – to an important industrial town and a famous Norwegian tourist destination.

Torstein attended the Finance and Administration College at Rjukan from 1972-73. He then went for training at the Technical College for Civil Engineering at Porsgrunn from 1976–78 and the Technical College in Civil Engineering at Stavanger from 1978-79.

== Career ==
=== Early career ===
After working in the contracting industry from late 1979, Torstein entered the energy sector in May 1981, joining Norwegian industrial conglomerate Norsk Hydro, where he served for 27 years. During his tenure at Norsk Hydro, he was promoted to senior positions across the company's operations in Oil and Gas and later in the aluminium business areas. The positions included the Vice President of the Angola Business Unit, living in West Africa, from 1995-2001, Senior Vice President for Exploration and Development Norway and held SVP positions in other businesses as well as in Norsk Hydro's aluminium area.

In 2005 he was appointed Head of Aluminium Metal at Norsk Hydro, where he led 5,000 employees in upstream aluminium operations – bauxite, alumina, aluminium smelters and cast houses, with 30 plants across 13 countries. From 2006 to 2008 he was also a member of the Corporate Management Board of Norsk Hydro as Executive Vice President, heading the upstream aluminium segment.

In August 2008 Torstein left Norsk Hydro to take up the position of President and CEO of Europe's biggest shipbuilding group, Aker Yards ASA, with 15,000 employees and listed on the Oslo Stock Exchange. During his service at Aker Yards ASA, the company was fully acquired by the Korean Shipbuilding group STX. He left the company after it was delisted and fully integrated into the STX Groups of companies.

=== Sarawak Energy ===
Under Torstein's leadership, Sarawak Energy has taken an active approach on the management of social and environmental aspects, positioning itself as a responsible corporate citizen.

Sarawak Energy became a sustainability partner with the International Hydropower Association in 2011. Sarawak Energy is being guided by the IHA Sustainability Protocol in implementing the hydropower development projects. Sarawak Energy also hosted the World Congress for Advancing Sustainable Hydropower in Kuching in May 2013.

Torstein has fostered a company direction where CSR initiatives are placed at centre stage, focusing on the capacity of hydropower to secure socio-economic development for the remote communities of Sarawak.

The ongoing Penan literacy programme provides basic reading, writing and numeracy skills for close to 500 people in the six Penan indigenous communities in Murum. With support from rural communities, besides literacy and numeracy, the programme has focused on new ways of thinking to improve living conditions, including health, hygiene, nutrition and gardening. The program endeavours to help the communities make the most of new opportunities arising through the community's resettlement programme.

Besides learning new skills, the program has been successful in providing key motivation to the community, with a strong focus on the importance of education. Its support is reflected by the enrollment of 280 students at the two new primary schools, SK Metalun and SK Tegulang in 2014.

Ongoing Corporate Social Responsibility (CSR) efforts have been rolled out to support the communities to play an inclusive role in the development of their new homes and communities. These CSR initiatives include the provision of amenities ranging from clean water, electricity supply, transportation, facilities for education and religious worship. SEB have also announced softer CSR schemes, including training programs on household management, agricultural skills as well as development of traditional handicrafts – all of which are being implemented to help improve household income and the economic and social advancement within the communities.

=== Boards ===
- Torstein has served on the Board of the International Hydro Power association since 2011, to which he was re-elected in 2013.
- He served as a member of the Board of the Norwegian Shipping Company Thorvald Klaveness Group from 2008 to 2011.
- He has also been the Chairman on the Board of the Norwegian Petroleum Association from 2002 to 2005.
- Member of the Board of Norwegian Industrial association "Norsk Industri" (2006-2009).
- Previously, he served as member of the Board and later as the Chairman of the third largest fish feed company in the world, BioMar Holding, which was listed on the Copenhagen Stock Exchange from 2003 to 2006.

== Awards ==
- Won the 'Most Influential Clean Energy Advocate Award' in conjunction with the 15th Power and Electricity World Asia Conference held in Singapore, which was presented during the 3rd Annual Asian Utility Industry Awards to celebrate and honour the contributions from individuals and organisations towards growth in Asia Pacific.
- Awarded by the Governor of Sarawak, the conferment of the Honorary Panglima Gemilang Bintang Kenyalang (P.G.B.K) – Grand Commander of the Order of the Star of Hornbill Sarawak, which carries the title of 'Datuk'.
- Awarded the Outstanding Entrepreneurship Award in the Oil & Gas, Mining and Energy category at the Asia Pacific Entrepreneurship Awards (APEA) BIMP-EAGA 2014.

== Personal life ==
Torstein lives in Oslo, Norway, dividing his time between mostly between Mo i Rana and the family in Oslo. he is married to Ann, has three children and four grandchildren. He enjoys skiing, boating and mountain tracking.
