= Samarahan (federal constituency) =

Sarawak constituency

Defunct federal constituency
- Legislature: Dewan Rakyat
- Constituency created: 1968
- Constituency abolished: 1990
- First contested: 1969
- Last contested: 1986

Samarahan was a federal constituency in Sarawak, Malaysia, that was represented in the Dewan Rakyat from 1971 to 1990.

The federal constituency was created in the 1968 redistribution and was mandated to return a single member to the Dewan Rakyat under the first past the post voting system.

== History ==
It was abolished in 1990 when it was redistributed.

=== Representation history ===
Members of Parliament for Samarahan
| Parliament | No | Years | Member | Party | Vote Share |
Constituency created
| | | 1969-1971 | Parliament was suspended | | |
| 3rd | P124 | 1971-1973 | Abdul Taib Mahmud (عبدالطيب محمود) | BUMIPUTERA | 5,842; 55.47% |
| 3rd | P124 | 1973-1974 | Abdul Taib Mahmud (عبدالطيب محمود) | BN (PBB) | 5,842; 55.47% |
| 4th | P134 | 1974-1978 | Abdul Taib Mahmud (عبدالطيب محمود) | BN (PBB) | 7,517; 72.52% |
| 5th | P134 | 1978-1982 | Abdul Taib Mahmud (عبدالطيب محمود) | BN (PBB) | 6,22; 74.08% |
| 6th | P134 | 1982-1986 | Abdul Taib Mahmud (عبدالطيب محمود) | BN (PBB) | Uncontested |
| 7th | P157 | 1986-1990 | Abdul Taib Mahmud (عبدالطيب محمود) | BN (PBB) | 9,814; 77.88% |
Constituency abolished, split into Padawan, Santubong, Batang Sadong and Kota Samarahan

=== State constituency ===
| Parliamentary constituency | State constituency | | | | | |
| Parliamentary constituency | 1969–1978 | 1978–1990 | 1990–1999 | 1999–2008 | 2008–2016 | 2016−present |
|---|---|---|---|---|---|---|
| Samarahan | Muara Tuang | | | | | |
| Samarahan | Sebandi | | | | | |

=== Historical boundaries ===
| State Constituency | Area | |
| State Constituency | 1968 | 1977 |
|---|---|---|
| Muara Tuang | Kampung Jernang Baru; Kampung Mendang Lumut; Kampung Naie Baru; Kampung Segitin; Samarahan | Demak Laut; Kampung Binyu; Muara Tuang; Samarahan; Sejingkat |
| Sebandi | Asajaya; Beliong; Demak Laut; Kampung Tambirat Lot; Sejingkat | Asajaya; Beliong; Kampung Serpat Ulu; Kampung Tambey; Kampung Tambirat Lot |

== Election results ==
Malaysian general election, 1986
| Party | Candidate | Votes | % | ∆% |
|---|---|---|---|---|
| BN | Abdul Taib Mahmud | 9,814 | 77.88 | ▲77.88 |
| Independent | Wan Mohd Zain Mohdzar @ W Zain Mahmud | 2,788 | 22.12 | ▲22.12 |
| Total valid votes | | 12,602 | 100.00 | |
| Total rejected ballots | | 176 | | |
| Unreturned ballots | | 0 | | |
| Turnout | | 12,778 | 76.88 | |
| Registered electors | | 16,620 | | |
| Majority | | 7,026 | 55.76 | |
| BN hold | | Swing | | |

Malaysian general election, 1982
| Party | Candidate | Votes | % | ∆% |
|---|---|---|---|---|
On the nomination day, Abdul Taib Mahmud won uncontested.
| BN | Abdul Taib Mahmud | | | |
| Total valid votes | | | 100.00 | |
| Total rejected ballots | | | | |
| Unreturned ballots | | | | |
| Turnout | | | | |
| Registered electors | | 13,847 | | |
| Majority | | | | |
| BN hold | | Swing | | |

Malaysian general election, 1978
| Party | Candidate | Votes | % | ∆% |
|---|---|---|---|---|
| BN | Abdul Taib Mahmud | 6,522 | 74.08 | ▲1.56 |
| Parti Anak Jati Sarawak | Razali Sapang | 2,282 | 25.92 | ▲25.92 |
| Total valid votes | | 8,804 | 100.00 | |
| Total rejected ballots | | 143 | | |
| Unreturned ballots | | 0 | | |
| Turnout | | 9,493 | 76.10 | ▼2.76 |
| Registered electors | | 12,475 | | |
| Majority | | 4,240 | 48.16 | ▲3.12 |
| BN hold | | Swing | | |

Malaysian general election, 1974
| Party | Candidate | Votes | % | ∆% |
|---|---|---|---|---|
| BN | Abdul Taib Mahmud | 7,517 | 72.52 | ▲72.52 |
| SNAP | Wazir Mohamed Khan | 2,849 | 27.48 | ▲10.04 |
| Total valid votes | | 10,366 | 100.00 | |
| Total rejected ballots | | 349 | | |
| Unreturned ballots | | 0 | | |
| Turnout | | 10,715 | 78.86 | |
| Registered electors | | 13,588 | | |
| Majority | | 4,668 | 45.04 | ▲16.55 |
| BN gain from PBB | | Swing | | ? |

Malaysian general election, 1969
| Party | Candidate | Votes | % |
|---|---|---|---|
| PBB | Abdul Taib Mahmud | 5,842 | 55.47 |
| SUPP | Wazir Mohamed Khan | 2,852 | 27.08 |
| SNAP | Abang Anwar Abang Junaidi | 1,837 | 17.44 |
| Total valid votes | | 10,531 | 100.00 |
| Total rejected ballots | | 525 | |
| Unreturned ballots | | 0 | |
| Turnout | | 11,056 | 86.24 |
| Registered electors | | 12,820 | |
| Majority | | 2,990 | 28.39 |
This was a new constituency created.
