= Balingian (state constituency) =

State constituency in Sarawak, Malaysia

Balingian (N58)
Sarawak constituency

State constituency
- Legislature: Sarawak State Legislative Assembly
MLA
Vacant
- Constituency created: 1968
- First contested: 1969
- Last contested: 2026

Balingian is a state constituency in Sarawak, Malaysia, that has been represented in the Sarawak State Legislative Assembly since 1969.

The state constituency was created in the 1968 redistribution and is mandated to return a single member to the Sarawak State Legislative Assembly under the first past the post voting system.

== Demographics ==
Ethnic breakdown of Balingian's electorate as of 2022
1. Malay-Muslim bumiputera (60.6%)
2. Sarawak bumiputera (31.4%)
3. Chinese (7.30%)
4. Other ethnicities (0.70%)

== History ==
As of 2020, Balingian has a population of 17,114 people.

=== Polling districts ===
According to the gazette issued on 31 October 2022, the Balingian constituency has a total of 14 polling districts.

State constituency	Polling Districts	Code	Location
Balingian (N58)	Litong	213/58/01	SK Kpg. Seberang Mukah
Balingian (N58)	Penakop	213/58/02	SK Kpg. Penakap Ulu Mukah
Balingian (N58)	Temesu	213/58/03	RH Entering Anak Geruna
Balingian (N58)	Balingan	213/58/04	SJK (C) Chung Hua Balingian
Balingian (N58)	Tutus	213/58/05	Pusat Sarawak Skills Mukah (PPKS) Mukah
Balingian (N58)	Jebungan	213/58/06	SK Kpg. Jebungan Mukah
Balingian (N58)	Kenyana	213/58/07	SK Kuala Kenyana Mukah
Balingian (N58)	Sesok	213/58/08	SK Kpg. Teh Mukah; SK Kpg. Sau Mukah; Dewan Serbaguna Kpg Sesok Baru
Balingian (N58)	Ulu Bedengan	213/58/09	Tadika Kemas Bayau Jln. Selangau / Mukah
Balingian (N58)	Bedengan	213/58/10	SK Sg. Bedengan Mukah
Balingian (N58)	Penipah	213/58/11	SK Sg. Penipah Mukah
Balingian (N58)	Kuala Balingian	213/58/12	SK Kuala Balingian
Balingian (N58)	Suyong	213/58/13	SK Parish
Balingian (N58)	Liok	213/58/14	SK Sg. Liok

=== Representation history ===
Members of the Legislative Assembly for Balingian
Assembly	Years	Member	Party
Constituency created
8th	1970-1973	Mohd. Pauzi Hamdani	PESAKA
8th	1973-1974	Mohd. Pauzi Hamdani	BN (PBB)
9th	1974-1977	Salleh Jafaruddin	BN (PBB)
9th	1977-1979	Wan Habib Syed Mahmud	BN (PBB)
10th	1979-1983	Wan Habib Syed Mahmud	BN (PBB)
11th	1983-1987	Wan Habib Syed Mahmud	BN (PBB)
12th	1987-1991	Abdul Ajis Abdul Majeed	BN (PBB)
13th	1991-1996	Abdul Ajis Abdul Majeed	BN (PBB)
14th	1996-2001	Abdul Ajis Abdul Majeed	BN (PBB)
15th	2001-2006	Abdul Taib Mahmud	BN (PBB)
16th	2006-2011	Abdul Taib Mahmud	BN (PBB)
17th	2011-2014	Abdul Taib Mahmud	BN (PBB)
17th	2014-2016	Yussibnosh Balo	BN (PBB)
18th	2016-2018	Abdul Yakub Arbi	BN (PBB)
18th	2018-2021	Abdul Yakub Arbi	GPS (PBB)
19th	2021–2026	Abdul Yakub Arbi	GPS (PBB)

== Election results ==
Sarawak state election, 2026
Party	Candidate	Votes	%	∆%
GPS				▲
PH				▲
Total valid votes				
Total rejected ballots				
Unreturned ballots				
Turnout				
Registered electors				
Majority				

Sarawak state election, 2021
Party	Candidate	Votes	%	∆%
GPS	Abdul Yaakub Arbi	4,050	71.13	▲71.13
PSB	Yusuf Abdul Rahman	1,146	20.13	▲20.13
PKR	Abdul Jalil Bujang	498	8.75	▼4.79
Total valid votes		5,694	100.00	
Total rejected ballots		84		
Unreturned ballots		6		
Turnout		5,784	66.45	▼3.24
Registered electors		8,704		
Majority		2,904	51.00	▼3.24
GPS gain from BN		Swing		?
Source(s) https://lom.agc.gov.my/ilims/upload/portal/akta/outputp/1718688/PUB687.pdf

Sarawak state election, 2016
Party	Candidate	Votes	%	∆%
BN	Abdul Yakub Arbi	4,208	77.18	▼9.28
Amanah	Nurzaiti Hamdan	1,244	22.82	▲22.82
Total valid votes		5,452	100.00	
Total rejected ballots		90		
Unreturned ballots		10		
Turnout		5,552	69.69	▼0.53
Registered electors		7,967		
Majority		2,964	54.37	▲8.73
BN hold		Swing		
Source(s) "Federal Government Gazette - Notice of Contested Election, State Legislative Assembly of the State of Sarawak [P.U. (B) 190/2016]" (PDF). Attorney General's Chambers of Malaysia. 25 April 2016. Archived from the original (PDF) on 12 June 2017. "Senarai Calon yang Disahkan Layak Bertanding Pilihan Raya Dewan Undangan Negeri ke-11". Election Commission of Malaysia. 25 April 2016. Archived from the original on 25 April 2016.

Sarawak state by-election, 29 March 2014 Upon the resignation of incumbent, Abdul Taib Mahmud
Party	Candidate	Votes	%	∆%
BN	Yussibnosh Balo	8,194	86.46	▲10.14
PKR	Abdul Jail Bujang	1,283	13.54	▲2.84
Total valid votes		9,477	100.00	
Total rejected ballots		146		
Unreturned ballots		1		
Turnout		9,624	72.00	▲1.78
Registered electors		13,366		
Majority		6,911	72.92	▲9.66
BN hold		Swing		
Source(s) "Pilihan Raya Kecil N.51 Balingian". Election Commission of Malaysia. Archived from the original on 19 September 2018. "Federal Government Gazette - Notice of Contested Election - By-election of the State Legislative Assembly of N.51 Balingian for the State of Sarawak [P.U. (B) 91/2014]" (PDF). Attorney General's Chambers of Malaysia. 17 March 2014. "Federal Government Gazette - Results of Contested Election and Statement of the Poll after the Official Addition of Votes for the By-election of N.51 Balingian [P.U. (B) 114/2014]" (PDF). Attorney General's Chambers of Malaysia. 1 April 2014.

Sarawak state election, 2011
Party	Candidate	Votes	%	∆%
BN	Abdul Taib Mahmud	6,210	76.32	▼14.32
Independent	Salleh Jafaruddin	1,056	12.98	▲12.98
PKR	Suriati Abdullah	871	10.70	▲1.25
Total valid votes		8,137	100.00	
Total rejected ballots		116		
Unreturned ballots		27		
Turnout		8,280	70.22	▲6.85
Registered electors		11,792		
Majority		5,154	63.34	▼17.38
BN hold		Swing		
Source(s) "Federal Government Gazette - Results of Contested Election and Statements of the Poll after the Official Addition of Votes Sarawak [P.U. (B) 245/2011]" (PDF). Attorney General's Chambers of Malaysia. 29 April 2011.

Sarawak state election, 2006
Party	Candidate	Votes	%	∆%
BN	Abdul Taib Mahmud	6,393	90.55	▼4.09
PKR	Ibrahim Bayau	667	9.45	▲9.45
Total valid votes		7,060	100.00	
Total rejected ballots		103		
Unreturned ballots		15		
Turnout		7,178	63.37	▼7.47
Registered electors		11,326		
Majority		5,726	81.11	▼10.41
BN hold		Swing		

Sarawak state election, 2001
Party	Candidate	Votes	%	∆%
BN	Abdul Taib Mahmud	7,532	94.64	▲30.56
Independent	Yeo Eng Choo @ Alice Alison Eng Choo	225	2.83	▲2.83
Independent	Kadri Jili	141	1.77	▲1.77
Independent	Alan Dunggat	61	0.76	▲0.76
Total valid votes		7,959	100.00	
Total rejected ballots		103		
Unreturned ballots		9		
Turnout		8,071	70.84	▲3.05
Registered electors		11,393		
Majority		7,307	91.81	▲47.47
BN hold		Swing		

Sarawak state election, 1996
Party	Candidate	Votes	%	∆%
BN	Abdul Ajis Abdul Majeed	4,622	64.08	▼13.34
Independent	Yusuf Abdul Rahman	2,591	35.92	▲35.92
Total valid votes		7,213	100.00	
Total rejected ballots		187		
Unreturned ballots		37		
Turnout		7,437	67.79	▼3.48
Registered electors		10,971		
Majority		2,031	28.16	▼34.81
BN hold		Swing		

Sarawak state election, 1991
Party	Candidate	Votes	%	∆%
BN	Abdul Ajis Abdul Majeed	5,742	77.42	▲17.91
PBDS	Hambali Annuar	1,088	14.67	▲14.67
Independent	Kadir @ Abdul Kadir Yahya	418	5.64	▲5.64
DAP	Wong Sing Hong @ Janggau	169	2.28	▲2.28
Total valid votes		7,417	100.00	
Total rejected ballots		115		
Unreturned ballots		66		
Turnout		7,598	71.27	▼3.00
Registered electors		10,661		
Majority		4,654	62.77	▲43.77
BN hold		Swing		

Sarawak state election, 1987
Party	Candidate	Votes	%	∆%
BN	Abdul Ajis Abdul Majeed	5,104	59.51	▼0.78
PERMAS	Wan Habib Syed Mahmud	3,473	40.49	▲40.49
Total valid votes		8,577	100.00	
Total rejected ballots		166		
Unreturned ballots		0		
Turnout		8,743	73.59	▲11.59
Registered electors		11,881		
Majority		1,631	19.01	▼24.01
BN hold		Swing		

Sarawak state election, 1983
Party	Candidate	Votes	%	∆%
BN	Wan Habib Syed Mahmud	3,777	60.29	▲60.29
DAP	Enggai Antasin	1,111	17.73	▲17.73
DAP	Wong Sing Hong (Janggau)	737	11.76	▲11.76
Independent	Awang Morsidi Awang Buyu	640	10.22	▲10.22
Total valid votes		6,265	100.00	
Total rejected ballots		207		
Unreturned ballots		0		
Turnout		6,472	62.18	▼62.18
Registered electors		10,409		
Majority		2,666	42.56	▲42.56
BN hold		Swing		

Sarawak state election, 1979
Party	Candidate	Votes	%	∆%
On nomination day, Wan Habib Syed Mahmud won uncontested.
BN	Wan Habib Syed Mahmud			
Total valid votes				
Total rejected ballots				
Unreturned ballots				
Turnout				
Registered electors		9,827		
Majority				
BN hold		Swing		

Sarawak state by-election, 9–11 June 1977 Upon the resignation of incumbent, Salleh Jafaruddin
Party	Candidate	Votes	%	∆%
BN	Wan Habib Syed Mahmud	3,053	60.85	▲60.85
Independent	Linggie Balong	1,964	39.15	▲39.15
Total valid votes		5,017	100.00	
Total rejected ballots		0		
Unreturned ballots		0		
Turnout		5,017	54.96	▲54.96
Registered electors		9,129		
Majority		1,089	21.71	▲21.71
BN hold		Swing		

Sarawak state election, 1974
Party	Candidate	Votes	%	∆%
BN	Salleh Jafaruddin	4,008	76.21	▲44.25
SNAP	Kassim Tindin	1,251	23.79	▲23.79
Total valid votes		5,259	100.00	
Total rejected ballots		423		
Unreturned ballots		0		
Turnout		5,682	62.24	▼1.00
Registered electors		9,129		
Majority		2,757	52.42	▲38.02
BN gain from PBB		Swing		?

Sarawak state election, 1969
Party	Candidate	Votes	%
PBB	Mohd. Pauzi Hamdani	1,555	31.96
SUPP	Ho Thian Ting	856	17.60
SNAP	Jang Kandawang	827	17.00
Independent	Mohd. Noh Hamdan	606	12.46
PESAKA	Sipuk Ani	523	10.75
PESAKA	Tampang Basek	267	5.49
Independent	Tan Yong Bee	231	4.75
Total valid votes		4,865	100.00
Total rejected ballots		362	
Unreturned ballots		0	
Turnout		5,227	63.24
Registered electors		8,265	
Majority		699	14.37
This was a new constituency created.
