= Sulaiman Abdul Rahman Taib =

Malaysian politician and businessman, (born 1968)

Yang Berbahagia Dato Sri Sulaiman Abdul Rahman Taib PNBS
- سليمان عبدالرحمٰن طيب

Deputy Minister of Tourism
- In office 19 March 2008 – 14 December 2009
- Monarch: Mizan Zainal Abidin
- Prime Minister: Abdullah Ahmad Badawi (2008–2009); Najib Razak (2009)
- Minister: Azalina Othman Said (2008–2009); Ng Yen Yen (2009)
- Preceded by: Donald Lim Siang Chai
- Succeeded by: James Dawos Mamit
- Constituency: Kota Samarahan

Member of the Malaysian Parliament for Kota Samarahan
- In office 8 March 2008 – 5 May 2013
- Preceded by: Abdul Taib Mahmud (BN–PBB)
- Succeeded by: Rubiah Wang (GPS–PBB)
- Majority: 11,411 (2008)

Personal details
- Born: 31 May 1968 (age 58) Sarawak, Malaysia
- Party: Parti Pesaka Bumiputera Bersatu (PBB)
- Other political affiliations: Barisan Nasional (until 2018); Gabungan Parti Sarawak (since 2018)
- Spouse: Anisa Chan Abdullah
- Relations: George Chan Hong Nam (Father-in-law); Ragad Waleed Alkurdi (Step-mother); Mahmud Abu Bekir Taib (Brother); Jamilah Taib Murray (Sister); Hanifah Hajar Taib (Sister) Syed Ahmad Alwee Alsree (Brother-in-law)
- Parent(s): Abdul Taib Mahmud (died 2024); Laila Taib (died 2009)
- Education: University of San Francisco
- Occupation: Businessman

Sulaiman Abdul Rahman bin Abdul Taib (born 31 May 1968) is a Malaysian politician and businessman who served as the Member of Parliament (MP) for Kota Samarahan from March 2008 until May 2013 and briefly served as Deputy Minister of Tourism of Malaysia.

== Business ==
=== Malaysia ===
Sulaiman holds a Bachelor of Science degree in Business Administration from the University of San Francisco. Sulaiman was the group Chairman of CMSB from 2002 to 2006, and the former RHB Bank chairman from May 2003 to 2006 following the takeover of RHB by CMS's Utama Banking group. He became the youngest chairman of the local bank at that time. He worked with his brother, Mahmud Abu Bekir Taib, brother-in-law Syed Ahmad Alwee Alsree and other board of directors of CMSB.

=== United States ===
Sulaiman was reported to be the sole officer and director of Sakti International Corporation and Wallyson's Inc. in the United States, companies reportedly owned by the Taib family.

== Political career ==
=== Deputy Minister of Tourism ===
During the 12th Malaysian General Election held in March 2008, Sulaiman stood as a candidate in the Kota Samarahan parliamentary seat previously held by his father, Abdul Taib Mahmud and won under the then Malaysian ruling coalition Barisan Nasional (BN) ticket. Following his win of the parliamentary seat, he was appointed as a Deputy Minister of Tourism in the cabinet of the then-Prime Minister Abdullah Ahmad Badawi. Under the new cabinet line-up of Prime Minister Najib Razak, he was once appointed again as a Deputy Minister of Tourism.

On 4 December 2009, Sulaiman resigned from his deputy ministerial post. Prime Minister Najib Razak accepted Sulaiman's resignation effective on 14 December 2009. Sulaiman was succeeded by James Dawos Mamit.

In 2002, Sulaiman was named the Knight Commander of the Order of the Star of Sarawak.

== Personal life ==
He is the third son of Abdul Taib Mahmud, the former Yang di-Pertua Negeri of Sarawak and former Chief Minister of Sarawak while his mother, Laila Taib (née Lejla Chaleck), is Polish Lipka Tatar Muslim. In 1991, Sulaiman wed 20-year-old Anisa, daughter of former Deputy Chief Minister of Sarawak George Chan Hong Nam.

== Election results ==
Parliament of Malaysia
Year	Constituency	Candidate	Votes	Pct	Opponent(s)	Votes	Pct	Ballots cast	Majority	Turnout
2008	P197 Kota Samarahan	Sulaiman Abdul Rahman Taib (PBB)	15,559	75.51%	Hussain Abang Apok (PKR)	4,148	20.13%	21,428	11,411	75.14%
2008	P197 Kota Samarahan	Sulaiman Abdul Rahman Taib (PBB)	15,559	75.51%	Awg Bakar Awg Daud (IND)	898	4.36%	21,428	11,411	75.14%

== Honours ==
- Sarawak
  - Knight Commander of the Most Exalted Order of the Star of Sarawak (PNBS) – Dato Sri (2002)
