= Sharifah Mordiah Tuanku Fauzi =

Malaysian politician

Yang Berbahagia Datuk Hajah Sharifah Mordiah Tuanku Fauzi PGBK
- سهاريفاه موردياه توانکو فاوزي

Member of the Sarawak State Legislative Assembly for Petra Jaya
- In office 1987–1991
- Preceded by: Hafsah Harun
- Succeeded by: Position abolished

Member of the Sarawak State Legislative Assembly for Pantai Damai
- In office 1991–2001
- Preceded by: Position established
- Succeeded by: Abdul Rahman Junaidi

Member of the Sarawak State Legislative Assembly for Samariang
- In office 2001–2006
- Preceded by: Dona Babel
- Succeeded by: Sharifah Hasidah Sayeed Aman Ghazali

Personal details
- Born: Sharifah Mordiah binti Tuanku Fauzi; 2 March 1948 (age 78) Kuching, Sarawak
- Citizenship: Malaysian
- Party: PBB
- Other political affiliations: Barisan Nasional (till 2018); Gabungan Parti Sarawak (since 2018)
- Spouse: Sayeed Aman Ghazali Sayeed Junaidi
- Relations: Tuanku Fauzi Tuanku Othman (Father); Sharifah Hasidah Tuanku Manshor (Mother)
- Children: 5 (incl. Sharifah Hasidah Sayeed Aman Ghazali)
- Occupation: Politician

Sharifah Mordiah binti Tuanku Fauzi is a Malaysian politician from PBB. She has served as the Member of the Sarawak State Legislative Assembly for Sebandi from 1979 to 1981, Petra Jaya from 1987 to 1991, Pantai Damai from 1991 to 2001, Samariang from 2001 to 2006.

== Politics ==
Sharifah Mordiah resigned as the Member of Sarawak State Legislative Assembly for Sebandi in 1981.

== Election results ==
Sarawak State Legislative Assembly
Year	Constituency	Candidate	Votes	Pct.	Opponent(s)	Votes	Pct.	Ballots cast	Majority	Turnout
1979	N07 Sebandi	Sharifah Mordiah Tuanku Fauzi (PBB)	3,966	84.94%	Mohd Nasir Daing Hosen (PAJAR)	703	15.06	4,794	4,794	74.3%
1987	N05 Petra Jaya	Sharifah Mordiah Tuanku Fauzi (PBB)	6,006	69.02%	Hafsah Harun (PERMAS)	2,696	30.98%	8,811	3,310	74.51%
1991	N03 Pantai Damai	Sharifah Mordiah Tuanku Fauzi (PBB)	Unopposed							
1996	N03 Pantai Damai	Sharifah Mordiah Tuanku Fauzi (PBB)	Unopposed							
2001	N07 Samariang	Sharifah Mordiah Tuanku Fauzi (PBB)	5,460	64.71%	Wan Ariffin Wan Senusi (PKR)	2,163	25.63%	8,609	3,297	69.55%
2001	N07 Samariang	Sharifah Mordiah Tuanku Fauzi (PBB)	5,460	64.71%	Mohamad Shokri Ahmad Fauzi (PAS)	468	5.55%	8,609	3,297	69.55%
2001	N07 Samariang	Sharifah Mordiah Tuanku Fauzi (PBB)	5,460	64.71%	Arifin Abang Anuar @ Arifin Annuar (IND)	347	4.11%	8,609	3,297	69.55%

== Honours ==
- Sarawak :
  - Commander of the Order of the Star of Hornbill Sarawak (PGBK) – Datuk (1991)
