= Roland Engan =

Malaysian politician

Roland Engan is a Malaysian politician of Dayak descent who serves as a vice president of the People's Justice Party (PKR). He previously served as Chairman of the State Leadership Council (MPN) of Sarawak PKR during the 2022–2025 term.

== Political career ==
Engan began his political career when he contested the 2013 general election for the Baram parliamentary seat, where he faced off against the incumbent, Anyi Ngau of Barisan Nasional (BN), and narrowly lost by 194 votes. He was nominated again by PKR to contest the Baram seat in the 2018 general election. However, he lost a second time to Anyi Ngau, who secured the seat with an increased majority of 1,990 votes.

In 2021, Engan was appointed as State Chairman of Sarawak PKR, a position that had been vacant for a year following the resignation of the previous chairman, Larry Sng. He contested the Baram seat for a third time in 2022, losing again to Anyi Ngau who won with a further increased majority of 7,339 votes. Engan became involved in PKR's central leadership when he was appointed as one of the party's vice-presidents in 2025, serving alongside four other elected vice-presidents: Amirudin Shari, Ramanan Ramakrishnan, Aminuddin Harun, and Chang Lih Kang.

== Election results ==
Parliament of Malaysia
Year	Constituency	Candidate	Votes	Pct	Opponent(s)	Votes	Pct	Ballots cast	Majority	Turnout
2013	P220 Baram	Roland Engan (PKR)	8,988	48.50%	Anyi Ngau (PDP)	9,182	49.54%	18,533	194	63.96%
2013	P220 Baram	Roland Engan (PKR)	8,988	48.50%	Patrick Sibat (IND)	363	1.96%	18,533	194	63.96%
2018	P220 Baram	Roland Engan (PKR)	10,181	45.55%	Anyi Ngau (PDP)	12,171	54.45%	22,352	1,990	63.91%
2022	P220 Baram	Roland Engan (PKR)	11,060	37.14%	Anyi Ngau (PDP)	18,399	61.78%	29,783	7,339	50.76%
2022	P220 Baram	Roland Engan (PKR)	11,060	37.14%	Wilfred Entika (IND)	810	1.06%	29,783	7,339	50.76%

Sarawak State Legislative Assembly
Year	Constituency	Candidate	Votes	Pct.	Opponent(s)	Votes	Pct.	Ballots cast	Majority	Turnout
2016	N77 Telang Usan	Roland Engan (PKR)	3,064	48.67%	Dennis Ngau (PBB)	3,231	51.33%	6,388	167	63.88%
2021	N78 Mulu	Roland Engan (PKR)	810	14.47%	Gerawat Gala (PBB)	3,731	66.67%	5,802	2,875	60.61%
2021	N78 Mulu	Roland Engan (PKR)	810	14.47%	Son Radu (PSB)	856	15.30%	5,802	2,875	60.61%
2021	N78 Mulu	Roland Engan (PKR)	810	14.47%	Richard Ibuh (PBK)	199	3.56%	5,802	2,875	60.61%
