= Jamilah Anu =

Malaysian politician (born 1955)

Yang Berbahagia Puan Sri Datuk Amar Hajah Jamilah Anu DA PSBS PBS
- جميلة انو

Member of the Sarawak State Legislative Assembly for Tanjong Datu
- In office 18 February 2017 – 18 December 2021
- Preceded by: Adenan Satem
- Succeeded by: Azizul Annuar Adenan
- Majority: 6,573 (2017)

Personal details
- Born: Jamilah binti Anu; 14 August 1955 (age 71) Bau, Crown Colony of Sarawak (now Sarawak, Malaysia)
- Citizenship: Malaysian
- Party: Parti Pesaka Bumiputera Bersatu (PBB)
- Other political affiliations: Barisan Nasional (BN) (until 2018); Gabungan Parti Sarawak (GPS) (since 2018)
- Spouse: Adenan Satem (m. 1980; died 2017)
- Children: 2
- Education: Universiti Teknologi MARA, Sabah
- Occupation: Politician

Jamilah binti Anu (Jawi: جميلة بنت آنو; born 14 August 1955) is a Malaysian politician who served as Member of Sarawak State Legislative Assembly (MLA) for Tanjong Datu from March 2017 to December 2021. She is also the widow and the second wife of fifth Chief Minister of Sarawak, Adenan Satem.

== Politics ==
In 2017, Jamilah was elected as the MLA of Tanjong Datu after she successfully defended the seat in the by-election triggered by the sudden demise of the incumbent MLA, who was also her husband Adenan Satem.

Jamilah opted to retire after four years in politics and not run in the 2021 state election in order to give the responsibility of defending her seat to her son Azizul Annuar Adenan.

== Election results ==
Sarawak State Legislative Assembly
Year	Constituency	Government	Votes	Pct	Opponent(s)	Votes	Pct	Ballots cast	Majority	Turnout
2017	N03 Tanjong Datu	Jamilah Anu (PBB)	6,573	96.53%	Rapelson Richard Hamid (PBDS)	130	1.91%	6,871	6,443	69.20%
2017	N03 Tanjong Datu	Jamilah Anu (PBB)	6,573	96.53%	Johnny Aput (STAR)	106	1.56%	6,871	6,443	69.20%

== Honours ==
- Sarawak
  - Knight Commander of the Order of the Star of Hornbill Sarawak (DA) – Datuk Amar (2016)
  - Commander of the Order of the Star of Sarawak (PSBS) – Dato (2003)
  - Officer of the Most Exalted Order of the Star of Sarawak (PBS)
  - Gold Medal of the Sarawak Independence Diamond Jubilee Medal (2023)
