= Baram (federal constituency) =

Federal constituency of Sarawak, Malaysia

Baram (P220)
Sarawak constituency

Federal constituency
- Legislature: Dewan Rakyat
- MP: Anyi Ngau; GPS
- Constituency created: 1968
- First contested: 1969
- Last contested: 2022

Demographics
- Population (2020): 63,499
- Electors (2022): 59,535
- Area (km²): 22,075
- Pop. density (per km²): 2.9

Baram is a federal constituency in Miri Division (Miri District, Beluru District, Marudi District & Telang Usan District), Sarawak, Malaysia, that has been represented in the Dewan Rakyat since 1971.

The federal constituency was created in the 1968 redistribution and is mandated to return a single member to the Dewan Rakyat under the first past the post voting system.

Baram is the second largest parliamentary constituency by area in Malaysia, covering over 22,000 sq km, slightly bigger than the state of Perak.

== Demographics ==
https://ge15.orientaldaily.com.my/seats/sarawak/p

Ethnic breakdown of Baram's electorate as of 2022
1. Sarawak bumiputera (81.6%)
2. Chinese (10.7%)
3. Malay-Muslim bumiputera (6.90%)
4. Other ethnicities (0.80%)

As of 2020, Baram has a population of 63,499 people.

Age breakdown of Baram's electorate as of 2022
1. 18-20 (6.34%)
2. 21-29 (19.1%)
3. 30-39 (19.6%)
4. 40-49 (16.7%)
5. 50-59 (16.4%)
6. 60-69 (12.0%)
7. 70-79 (5.43%)
8. 80-89 (2.68%)
9. above 90 (1.80%)
Gender breakdown of Baram's electorate as of 2022
1. Male (51.7%)
2. Female (48.3%)

== History ==
=== Polling districts ===
According to the gazette issued on 31 October 2022, the Baram constituency has a total of 21 polling districts.

State constituency	Polling Districts	Code	Location
Marudi（N76）	Nabor	220/76/01	SK Lepong Ajai Sg. Liam Bakong; SK Sg. Liam; RH Wilson Ak Juna; SK Sg. Entulang; RH Engkas Ak Entari; RH Joshua Ak Dungkong Sg Mallang Ulu; SK Buri Sg. Buri; SK Sg. Arang Bakong; SK Sg. Biar Bakong
Marudi（N76）	Pengalayan	220/76/02	RH Budin Assam Paya; SK Pengalayan; RH Ngelingkong Teroja; RH Chabop Lubok Amam; SK Benawa; SK Dato Sharif Hamid; Kampong Long Maro Tinjar
Marudi（N76）	Marudi	220/76/03	SJK (C) Chung Hua Marudi; SK Sg. Jaong Marudi; SK Good Shepherd Marudi
Marudi（N76）	Beluru	220/76/04	RH Salwan Sg. Lai Bakong; SJK (C) Hua Kwong Bakong; Dewan Serbaguna Kpg. Melayu; RH Morgan; RH Linggie; SK Selepin; RH Saba Ak bagus; SK Laong; RH Tan Sg. Temam; SK Kelabit Bakong; RH Bantan Sg. Lutong Atas; RH Drahmam Sg. Lutong Atas; RH Janting Sg. Lutong Bawah, Bakong; RH Ali Sg. Sebukut, Bakong; SK Bakas; RH Pengiran Damit Sg. Mangka Bakong
Marudi（N76）	Teruking	220/76/05	SK Pengarah Enteri; RH Riggie Anak Belulok Sg. Nat Ulu Teru; SK Sg. Bong; SK Sg. Bain; RH Banyah Ak Banyi Sg. Sebubu; SK Sg. Sebatu; SK Peking
Marudi（N76）	Long Teru	220/76/06	RH Jamu Ng. Seridan; RH Nyiga Sg. Niru; RH Balang Lg Tuyut; RH Hillary Jungang Ng. Ajoi; RH Kajan Sigeh Lg. Teru; RH Meran Surang Logan Bunut; RH Musin Sebatang Bok; SK L.g. Spelling
Marudi（N76）	Jegan	220/76/07	RH Malina Ng. Tisam; SK Lg. Jegan; RH Jarau Lg Tabing; SK Long Teran Kanan; SK Sg. Seputi; SK Lapok Tinjar
Telang Usan (N77)	Long Miri	220/77/01	SK Lg. Miri (Daleh Lg. Pelutan); SK Lg. Tepen Pelutan; SK Uma Bawang; SK Lg. Pilah
Telang Usan (N77)	Pana	220/77/02	RH TK Kalong Nun Lg. Buken; RH TK Bitang Sakai lg Law; SK Lg. Aton; SK Lg. Sobeng; SK Lg Loyang; RH Lg. Aya; Kpg. Lg. Tebanyi Tinjar
Telang Usan (N77)	Akapatah	220/77/03	SK L.g. Kesseh; SK Lg. Naah; RH TK Madang Wan; SK L.g. Luteng Patah; RH TK Ibau Wan Lg. Tebangan
Telang Usan (N77)	San	220/77/04	SK St. Pius Lg San; SK Lg. Palai; SK Lg. Anap; SK Lg. Apu; RH TK Mathew Belulok Lalo; RH Tk Long Tap
Telang Usan (N77)	Long Lama	220/77/05	RH Tk Jacob Lawai Nawan Sg Dua Baram; SK Lg. Laput; SMK Lg. Lama; RH Tk Anthony Ngau Kpg. Uma Akeh; SK Murek Lg. Banyok; SK Lg. Ikang
Telang Usan (N77)	Apoh	220/77/06	SK Lg. Kevok; SK Lg. Bedian; Tadika Kampung Long Beluk; SK Lg. Bemang; SK Lg. Atip; SK L.g. Wat; Dewan Serbaguna Kampung Long Latei; RH Tk Kampung Long Win; Balai Raya Kpg Ba' Kabeng
Mulu (N78)	Lubok Nibong	220/78/01	SK Lubok Nibong; SJK (C) Hua Nam
Mulu (N78)	Puyut	220/78/02	SK Sg. Setapang; RH Lalo Selejau; RH Jugah Sg. Belasoi; RH Blalang Anak Atom Sg Sengkabang; RH Lansam Sg. Dabai; SK Puyut; SK Rumah Gudang; SK Lg. Linei; RH Adang Sg Ridan; SK Sg. Brit; RH Ridab Ak Selat Sg. Pasir
Mulu (N78)	Limotu	220/78/03	SK Lg. Sait; RH TK John Jau Wan Lg. Semiang; SK Lg. Tungan; SK Lg. Moh; RH TK Lucas Ngau Lg. Selaan Tepuan; SK Lg. Mengkaba; SK Lg. Jekitan; SK Lg. Jeeh; SK Lg. Lamei; SK Lio Mato
Mulu (N78)	Tutoh	220/78/04	SK Batu Bungan Sg. Melinau; SK Lg. Seidan; SK Penghulu Baya Mallang; SK Long Panai; RH Tk Christhopher Pusu Yin Lg. Ukok; RH Tk Asong Jaban; SK Kuala Tutoh
Mulu (N78)	Long Peluan	220/78/05	RH TK Tuloi Bayo Lg. Peluan; SK Lg Banga
Mulu (N78)	Bario	220/78/06	SK Bario
Mulu (N78)	Pa'Lungan	220/78/07	RH TK Bujang Pa' Ukat; RH TK Maren Pu'un Pa' Lungan
Mulu (N78)	Dano	220/78/08	RH TK Barang Lugun; SMK Bario
Mulu (N78)	Remudu	220/78/09	SK Pa' Dalih; RH TK Maren Lugun Remudu
Mulu (N78)	Lellang	220/78/10	RH TK Amat Aran Lg. Lellang

=== Representation history ===
Members of Parliament for Baram
Parliament	No	Years	Member	Party	Vote Share
Constituency created					
		1969–1971	Parliament was suspended		
3rd	P143	1971–1974	Luhat Wan	SNAP	5,100; 58.23%
4th	P153	1974–1976	Luhat Wan	SNAP	5,100; 58.23%
4th	P153	1976–1978	Luhat Wan	BN (SNAP)	6,050; 58.87%
5th	P153	1978–1982	Luhat Wan	BN (SNAP)	Uncontested
6th	P153	1982-1986	Luhat Wan	BN (SNAP)	5,905; 59.29%
7th	P176	1986–1990	Luhat Wan	BN (SNAP)	5,813; 53.01%
8th	P179	1990–1995	Harrison Ngau Laing	Independent	5,581; 45.69%
9th	P191	1995–1999	Jacob Dungau Sagan	BN (PDP)	8,829; 68.20%
10th	P192	1999-2004	Jacob Dungau Sagan	BN (PDP)	8,609; 83.21%
11th	P218	2004–2008	Jacob Dungau Sagan	BN (PDP)	7,551; 64.03%
12th	P220	2008–2013	Jacob Dungau Sagan	BN (PDP)	7,996; 66.92%
13th	P220	2013–2018	Anyi Ngau	BN (PDP)	9,182; 49.54%
14th	P220	2018	Anyi Ngau	BN (PDP)	12,171; 54.45%
14th	P220	2018–2022	Anyi Ngau	GPS (PDP)	12,171; 54.45%
15th	P220	2022–present	Anyi Ngau	GPS (PDP)	18,399; 61.78%

=== State constituency ===
Parliamentary constituency	State constituency					
Parliamentary constituency	1969–1978	1978–1990	1990–1999	1999–2008	2008–2016	2016−present
Baram	Marudi					
Baram						Mulu
Baram	Telang Usan					

=== Historical boundaries ===
State Constituency	Area					
State Constituency	1968	1977	1987	1996	2005	2015
Marudi	Bakong; Kampung Engkabang; Long Jegan; Long Seridan; Mulu		Bakong; Kampung Engkabang; Long Jegan; Long Teru; Teruking	Bakong; Long Jegan; Long Teru; Marudi; Teruking		
Mulu						Bario; Mulu; Long Apu; Long Moh; Long Seridan
Telang Usan	Bario; Long Lama; Long San; Long Seridan; Usun Apau		Bario; Long Lama; Long Seridan; Mulu; Usun Apau	Kampung Engkabang; Long Lama; Long Moh; Long San; Usun Apau		Long Lama; Long Miri; Long Pila; Long San; Telang Usan

=== Current state assembly members ===
No.	State Constituency	Member	Party (Coalition)
N76	Marudi	Penguang Manggil	GPS (PDP)
N77	Telang Usan	Dennis Ngau	GPS (PBB)
N78	Mulu	Gerawat Gala	GPS (PBB)

=== Local governments & postcodes ===
No.	State Constituency	Local Government	Postcode
N76	Marudi	Marudi District Council	98050 Baram; 98300 Long Lama
N77	Telang Usan	Marudi District Council	98050 Baram; 98300 Long Lama
N78	Mulu	Miri City Council (Bario area); Marudi District Council	98050 Baram; 98300 Long Lama

== Election results ==
Malaysian general election, 2022
Party	Candidate	Votes	%	∆%
GPS	Anyi Ngau	18,399	61.78	▲7.33
PH	Roland Engan	11,060	37.14	▲37.14
Independent	Wilfred Entika	324	1.09	▲1.09
Total valid votes		29,783	100.00	
Total rejected ballots		332		
Unreturned ballots		103		
Turnout		30,218	50.76	▼13.15
Registered electors		59,535		
Majority		7,339	24.64	▲15.74
GPS gain from BN		Swing		?
Source(s) https://lom.agc.gov.my/ilims/upload/portal/akta/outputp/1753265/PARLIMEN%20SARAWAK%20(PUB%20620).pdf

Malaysian general election, 2018
Party	Candidate	Votes	%	∆%
BN	Anyi Ngau	12,171	54.45	▲4.91
PKR	Roland Engan	10,181	45.55	▼2.95
Total valid votes		22,352	100.00	
Total rejected ballots		399		
Unreturned ballots		55		
Turnout		22,806	63.91	▼0.05
Registered electors		35,685		
Majority		1,990	8.90	▲7.86
BN hold		Swing		
Source(s) "His Majesty's Government Gazette - Notice of Contested Election, Parliament for the State of Sarawak [P.U. (B) 247/2018]" (PDF). Attorney General's Chambers of Malaysia. 3 May 2018. "Federal Government Gazette - Results of Contested Election and Statements of the Poll after the Official Addition of Votes, Parliamentary Constituencies for the State of Sarawak [P.U. (B) 321/2018]" (PDF). Attorney General's Chambers of Malaysia. 28 May 2018. Archived from the original (PDF) on 29 December 2019.

Malaysian general election, 2013
Party	Candidate	Votes	%	∆%
BN	Anyi Ngau	9,182	49.54	▼17.38
PKR	Roland Engan	8,988	48.50	▲48.50
Independent	Patrick Sibat	363	1.96	▲1.96
Total valid votes		18,533	100.00	
Total rejected ballots		242		
Unreturned ballots		21		
Turnout		18,796	63.96	▲14.31
Registered electors		29,385		
Majority		194	1.04	▼32.80
BN hold		Swing		
Source(s) "Federal Government Gazette - Notice of Contested Election, Parliament for the State of Sarawak [P.U. (B) 184/2013]" (PDF). Attorney General's Chambers of Malaysia. 26 April 2013. Archived from the original (PDF) on 30 September 2018. "Federal Government Gazette - Results of Contested Election and Statements of the Poll after the Official Addition of Votes, Parliamentary Constituencies for the State of Sarawak [P.U. (B) 225/2013]" (PDF). Attorney General's Chambers of Malaysia. 22 May 2013. Archived from the original (PDF) on 30 September 2018.

Malaysian general election, 2008
Party	Candidate	Votes	%	∆%
BN	Jacob Dungau Sagan	7,996	66.92	▲2.89
Independent	Kebing Wan	3,952	33.08	▲33.08
Total valid votes		11,948	100.00	
Total rejected ballots		167		
Unreturned ballots		11		
Turnout		12,126	49.65	▲2.44
Registered electors		24,425		
Majority		4,044	33.84	▲5.70
BN hold		Swing		

Malaysian general election, 2004
Party	Candidate	Votes	%	∆%
BN	Jacob Dungau Sagan	7,551	64.03	▼19.18
SNAP	Kebing Wan	4,241	35.97	▲35.97
Total valid votes		11,792	100.00	
Total rejected ballots		165		
Unreturned ballots		16		
Turnout		11,973	47.21	▲4.47
Registered electors		25,361		
Majority		3,310	28.06	▼38.36
BN hold		Swing		

Malaysian general election, 1999
Party	Candidate	Votes	%	∆%
BN	Jacob Dungau Sagan	8,609	83.21	▲15.01
Independent	Sedi Li	1,737	16.79	▲16.79
Total valid votes		10,346	100.00	
Total rejected ballots		259		
Unreturned ballots		14		
Turnout		10,619	42.74	▼7.85
Registered electors		24,842		
Majority		6,872	66.42	▲22.21
BN gain		Swing		

Malaysian general election, 1995
Party	Candidate	Votes	%	∆%
BN	Jacob Dungau Sagan	8,829	68.20	▲29.38
PBS	Harrison Ngau Laing	3,106	23.99	▲23.99
Independent	Luhat Wan	1,010	7.80	▲7.80
Total valid votes		12,945	100.00	
Total rejected ballots		190		
Unreturned ballots		23		
Turnout		13,158	50.09	▼4.56
Registered electors		26,271		
Majority		5,723	44.21	▲37.34
BN gain		Swing		{{{3}}}

Malaysian general election, 1990
Party	Candidate	Votes	%	∆%
Independent	Harrison Ngau Laing	5,581	45.69	▲45.69
BN	Luhat Wan	4,742	38.82	▼14.19
Independent	Jok Ding	1,892	15.49	▼15.87
Total valid votes		12,215	100.00	
Total rejected ballots		202		
Unreturned ballots		0		
Turnout		12,417	54.65	▲2.13
Registered electors		22,722		
Majority		839	6.87	▼14.78
Independent gain from BN		Swing		?

Malaysian general election, 1986
Party	Candidate	Votes	%	∆%
BN	Luhat Wan	5,813	53.01	▼6.23
Independent	Jok Ding	3,439	31.36	▲31.36
Independent	Joshua Lawai	1,325	12.08	▲12.08
Independent	Wong Ah Siew	389	3.55	▲3.55
Total valid votes		10,966	100.00	
Total rejected ballots		306		
Unreturned ballots		0		
Turnout		11,272	52.47	▼2.27
Registered electors		21,482		
Majority		2,374	21.65	▼9.20
BN hold		Swing		

Malaysian general election, 1982
Party	Candidate	Votes	%	∆%
BN	Luhat Wan	5,905	59.29	▲59.29
Independent	Gabriel Yuking	2,833	28.44	▲28.44
Independent	Kho Thiang Seng	1,222	12.27	▲12.27
Total valid votes		9,960	100.00	
Total rejected ballots		397		
Unreturned ballots		0		
Turnout		10,357	54.74	
Registered electors		18,921		
Majority		3,072	30.85	
BN hold		Swing		

Malaysian general election, 1978
Party	Candidate	Votes	%	∆%
On the nomination day, Luhat Wan won uncontested.
BN	Luhat Wan			
Total valid votes			100.00	
Total rejected ballots				
Unreturned ballots				
Turnout				
Registered electors				
Majority				
BN gain from SNAP		Swing		?

Malaysian general election, 1974
Party	Candidate	Votes	%	∆%
SNAP	Luhat Wan	6,050	58.87	▲0.64
BN	Joseph Wan Tingang	4,227	41.13	▲41.13
Total valid votes		10,277	100.00	
Total rejected ballots		590		
Unreturned ballots		0		
Turnout		10,867	71.41	▲0.09
Registered electors		15,218		
Majority		1,823	17.74	▼19.22
SNAP hold		Swing		

Malaysian general election, 1969
Party	Candidate	Votes	%
SNAP	Luhat Wan	5,100	58.23
SUPP	Tama Weng Tinggang Wan	1,863	21.27
PESAKA	Gau Jau	1,795	20.50
Total valid votes		8,758	100.00
Total rejected ballots		550	
Unreturned ballots			
Turnout		9,308	71.32
Registered electors		13,051	
Majority		3,237	36.96
This was a new constituency created.
