= 2017 Tanjong Datu by-election =

Election in Malaysia

- 18 February 2017

Tanjong Datu seat in the Sarawak State Legislative Assembly
	BN	PBDS Baru	STAR
Candidate	Jamilah Anu	Rapelson Richard Hamit	Johnny Bob Aput
Party	BN (PBB)	PBDS Baru	STAR
Popular vote	6,573	130	108
Percentage	96.51%	1.91%	1.59%
Tanjong Datu assemblyman before election
Adenan Satem
BN (PBB)
Elected Tanjong Datu assemblyman
Jamilah Anu
BN (PBB)

A by-election was held for the Sarawak State Assembly seat of Tanjong Datu on 18 February 2017 following the nomination day on 4 February 2017. The seat fell vacant following the death of its state assemblyman and Sarawak Chief Minister Adenan Satem from cardiac arrest on January 11, 2017. Adenan, who was also president of the Parti Pesaka Bumiputera Bersatu (a Barisan Nasional component party), won the Tanjong Datu seat in 2016 state elections when he defeated Jazolkipli Numan of PKR by polling 6,360 votes against 468 by Jazolkipli.

The Tanjong Datu by-election will see a three-way contest between Barisan Nasional candidate Jamilah Anu, State Reform Party candidate Johnny Aput and Parti Bansa Dayak Sarawak Baru candidate Rapelson Richard Hamit. Jamilah is the widow of Adenan and has been known for her involvement in charity and volunteer work and accompanying her late husband on constituency visits.

== Results ==
Jamilah Anu managed to retain the seat for Barisan Nasional with a majority of 6,443 votes beating two other candidates.

Sarawak state by-election, 18 February 2017: Tanjong Datu The by-election was called due to the death of incumbent, Adenan Satem
Party	Candidate	Votes	%	∆%
BN	Jamilah Anu	6,573	96.51	
PBDS Baru	Rapelson Richard Hamit	130	1.91	
STAR	Johnny Bob Aput	108	1.59	
Total valid votes		6,811	100.00	
Total rejected ballots		80		
Unreturned ballots		1		
Turnout		6,892	69.20	
Registered electors		9,959		
Majority		6,443		
BN hold		Swing		
Source(s) "Federal Government Gazette - Notice of Contested Election - By-election of the State Legislative Assembly of N.03 Tanjong Datu for the State of Sarawak [P.U. (B) 87/2017]" (PDF). Attorney General's Chambers of Malaysia. 6 February 2017. Archived from the original (PDF) on 2017-06-13. "Federal Government Gazette - Results of Contested Election and Statement of the Poll after the Official Addition of Votes for the By-election of N.03 Tanjong Datu [P.U. (B) 110/2017]" (PDF). Attorney General's Chambers of Malaysia. 24 February 2017. Archived from the original (PDF) on 2017-06-13.
