= Dennis Ngau =

Malaysian politician

Yang Berhormat Dato Dennis Ngau MLA PSBS

Member of the Sarawak State Legislative Assembly for Telang Usan
- Incumbent
- Assumed office 2011
- Preceded by: Lihan Jok

Personal details
- Born: Dennis Ngau Sarawak
- Citizenship: Malaysian
- Party: PBB
- Other political affiliations: Barisan Nasional (till 2018); Gabungan Parti Sarawak (since 2018)
- Occupation: Politician

Dennis Ngau is a Malaysian politician from PBB. He has served as the Member of the Sarawak State Legislative Assembly for Telang Usan since 2011.

== Election results ==
Sarawak State Legislative Assembly
Year	Constituency	Candidate	Votes	Pct.	Opponent(s)	Votes	Pct.	Ballots cast	Majority	Turnout
2011	N67 Telang Usan	Dennis Ngau (PBB)	3,597	46.85%	Harrison Ngau Laing (PKR)	2,752	35.85%	7,785	845	57.15%
2011	N67 Telang Usan	Dennis Ngau (PBB)	3,597	46.85%	Kebing Wan (SNAP)	705	9.18%	7,785	845	57.15%
2011	N67 Telang Usan	Dennis Ngau (PBB)	3,597	46.85%	Jok Ding (IND)	623	8.12%	7,785	845	57.15%
2016	N77 Telang Usan	Dennis Ngau (PBB)	3,231	51.33%	Roland Engan (PKR)	3,064	48.67%	6,388	167	63.88%
2021	N77 Telang Usan	Dennis Ngau (PBB)	3,861	59.76%	Jau Jok @ Jenggo (PSB)	1,439	22.27%	6,562	2,422	57.24%
2021	N77 Telang Usan	Dennis Ngau (PBB)	3,861	59.76%	Philip Jau Ding (PKR)	1,093	16.92%	6,562	2,422	57.24%
2021	N77 Telang Usan	Dennis Ngau (PBB)	3,861	59.76%	Gia Bala (PBK)	68	1.05%	6,562	2,422	57.24%

== Honours ==
- Sarawak :
  - Commander of the Most Exalted Order of the Star of Sarawak (PSBS) – Dato (2023)
