= Azizul Annuar Adenan =

Malaysian politician

Yang Berhormat Azizul Annuar Adenan MLA
- ازيزول اننوار ادنان

Member of the Sarawak State Legislative Assembly for Tanjong Datu
- Incumbent
- Assumed office 2021
- Preceded by: Jamilah Anu

Personal details
- Born: Azizul Annuar bin Adenan; 1991 (age 34–35) Kuching, Sarawak
- Citizenship: Malaysian
- Party: PBB
- Other political affiliations: Gabungan Parti Sarawak
- Spouse: Nurul Haziemah
- Relations: Hazland Abang Hipni (father in-law)
- Parent(s): Adenan Satem (father); Jamilah Anu (mother)
- Education: Murdoch University, Australia
- Occupation: Politician

Azizul Annuar bin Adenan is a Malaysian politician from PBB. He has served as the Member of the Sarawak State Legislative Assembly for Tanjong Datu since 2021.

== Family ==
Azizul Annuar is the son of the 5th Chief Minister of Sarawak, Adenan Satem.

On October 21, 2026, an axe attack involving a female teacher occurred at Tunku Putra-HELP International School in Kuching, Sarawak, Malaysia. The alleged assailant was reportedly the nephew of Adenan.

== Election results ==
Sarawak State Legislative Assembly
Year	Constituency	Candidate	Votes	Pct.	Opponent(s)	Votes	Pct.	Ballots cast	Majority	Turnout
2021	N03 Tanjong Datu	Azizul Annuar Adenan (PBB)	5,423	79.39%	Jery’in Fauzi (PSB)	921	13.48%	6,831	4,502	61.29%
2021	N03 Tanjong Datu	Azizul Annuar Adenan (PBB)	5,423	79.39%	Abdul Talib Baee (IND)	261	3.82%	6,831	4,502	61.29%
2021	N03 Tanjong Datu	Azizul Annuar Adenan (PBB)	5,423	79.39%	Goem Pijar (PBK)	226	3.31%	6,831	4,502	61.29%
