= Harrison Ngau Laing =

Malaysian politician

Member of the Parliament of Malaysia
- In office 1990–1995

Personal details
- Born: 1959 (age 66–67)
- Occupation: Politician
- Awards: Goldman Environmental Prize (1990)

Harrison Ngau Laing (born 1959) is a Malaysian environmentalist and politician, a member of the Kayan tribe. He was awarded the Goldman Environmental Prize in 1990 for his work to prevent deforestation of the Sarawak region. He was a member of the Malaysian Parliament from 1990 to 1995.

== Life and career ==
Harrison Ngau was born in 1959 at his home village in Long Keseh, which is located near the Baram River in the northern region of Sarawak. In 1976, a logging company named WTK (short form for the company's founder, Wong Tuong Kwang) went to his village. Harrison was a 17-year-old boy who just had just completed second last year of his secondary school at Marudi. He went back to his village for a Christmas holiday when a large meeting convened in his longhouse. The villagers only realised that WTK company had just been granted a concession behind their longhouse when the company turned up with bulldozers, heavy machinery, and chainsaws in front of them. The villagers initially mooted the idea of stopping the loggers, however when company workers sent them some free biscuits and Coke, the villagers accepted the food and the resistance died down. It was later turned out that two villagers in the longhouse own shares in another logging company who owned the concession. They sold to concession to WTK and made a handsome profit. Since Harrison was the only one who know how write, he offered himself to write letters to the company. WTK later agreed to pay a compensation of RM 2 (US$0.60) for every tonne of timber taken from their area.

Harrison then went on to work in a hotel in Miri, an ice factory, and with Shell oil company. In 1980, he started Sarawak branch of Sahabat Alam Malaysia (SAM), an environmental and human rights organisation in Malaysia. He went to Marudi rented an office for his organisation. In November 1980, he was married to 17-year-old Uding, another Kayan from a nearby village. They raised four children and continue to campaigned against logging companies in Baram region. The first protest was at the Apoh river against the Samling logging company. The Kayans from three longhouses went to threatened the company's employees. The company then agreed to pay compensation to the three longhouses. Harrison's organisation was primarily involved in advising the indigenous people in exercising their land rights. In the mid 1980s, the Penan people started turn up to his office when they themselves were also affected by logging.

The biggest protest came in March 1987 when 4,700 indigenous people from 26 Penan villages and six longhouses turned up simultaneously to prevent loggers from reaching upper Baram and Limbang region. Around 200 bulldozers and 1,600 timber workers were held up for several months. After a few months, the blockade was forcefully dismantled by the police. On 27 October 1987, Operation Lalang was started by the then Malaysian prime minister, Mahathir Mohamad. Harrison was arrested under Internal Security Act. Harrison was flown to Miri and spent a night at a cell there before he was transported to Kuching through an off-road vehicle. He was held for 60 days and nights but no charge was brought against him. Harrison was released in December 1987. Harrison's arrest brought attention to environmental campaigners and human rights activists worldwide. They wrote letters to protest the Malaysian government actions. One year later, SAM received the Right Livelihood Award for Harrison's work in Sarawak.

Harrison received Goldman Environmental Prize in 1990. He later used the prize money to fund his campaign against Barisan Nasional (BN) during 1990 Malaysian general election. He defeated the deputy minister of Public Works, Luhat Wan and became the member of parliament for Baram constituency. However, in the 1995 Malaysian general election, he was defeated by another BN candidate Jacob Dungau Sagan.
