= Adenan Satem =

Malaysian politician (1944–2017)

Yang Berbahagia Tan Sri Pehin Sri Adenan Satem PSM SBS DGSM DP DA PNBS JBS PPB
- عدنان صتيم
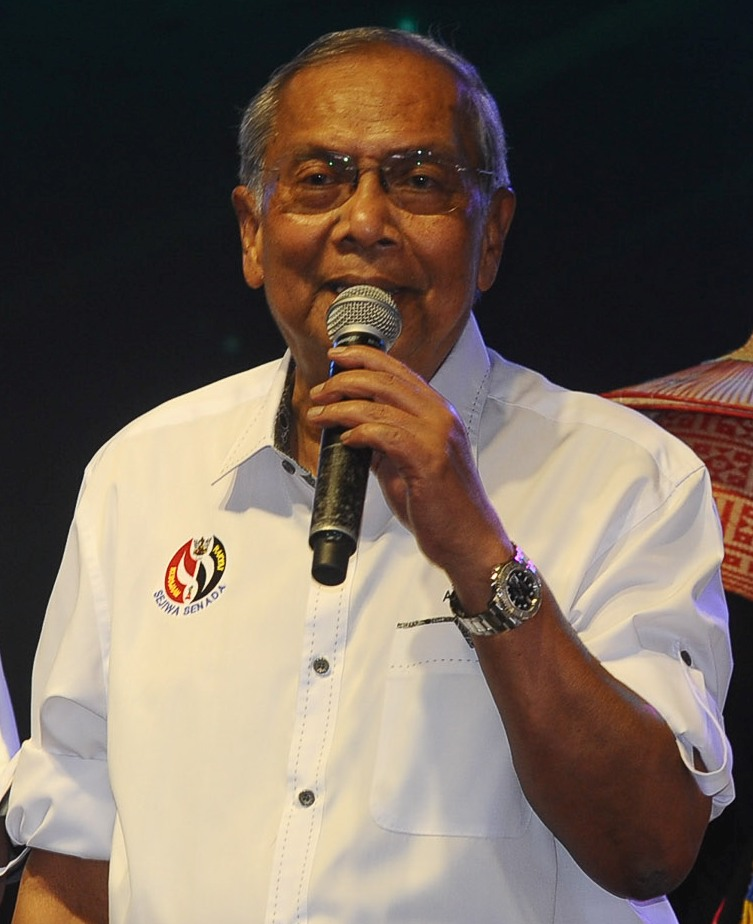
- Adenan in 2016

5th Chief Minister of Sarawak
- In office 1 March 2014 – 11 January 2017
- Governor: Abdul Taib Mahmud
- Deputy: Alfred Jabu Numpang (1976–2016); Douglas Uggah Embas (2016–present); Abang Abdul Rahman Zohari Abang Openg (2016–2017); James Jemut Masing (2016–2021)
- Preceded by: Abdul Taib Mahmud
- Succeeded by: Abang Abdul Rahman Zohari Abang Openg (As Premier)

5th President of Parti Pesaka Bumiputera Bersatu
- In office 1 March 2014 – 11 January 2017
- Preceded by: Abdul Taib Mahmud
- Succeeded by: Abang Abdul Rahman Zohari Abang Openg

Member of the Malaysian Parliament for Batang Sadong
- In office 2004–2008
- Preceded by: Sukinam Domo
- Succeeded by: Nancy Shukri
- Majority: 9,732 (2004)

Member of the Sarawak State Legislative Assembly for Tanjong Datu
- In office 20 May 2006 – 11 January 2017
- Preceded by: Ranum Mina
- Succeeded by: Jamilah Anu
- Majority: 4,136 (2006); 3,216 (2011); 5,892 (2016)

Member of the Sarawak State Legislative Assembly for Muara Tuang
- In office 1979–2006
- Succeeded by: Mohamad Ali Mahmud
- Majority: 8,272 (1991); 9,708 (2001)

Sarawak Minister with Special Functions
- In office 6 June 2011 – 28 February 2014
- Preceded by: Office established
- Succeeded by: Office vacant

Personal details
- Born: Adenan bin Satem; 27 January 1944 Kuching, Empire of Japan (now Malaysia)
- Died: 11 January 2017 (aged 72) Kota Samarahan, Sarawak, Malaysia
- Resting place: Samariang Muslim Cemetery, Kuching, Malaysia
- Citizenship: Malaysian
- Party: Parti Pesaka Bumiputera Bersatu
- Other political affiliations: Barisan Nasional
- Spouse(s): Aisah Zainab Mahmud (m. 1972) Jamilah Anu (m. 1980)
- Children: 5 (incl. Azizul Annuar Adenan)
- Relatives: Abdul Taib Mahmud (brother-in-law)
- Education: University of Adelaide (LLB)
- Occupation: Politician
- Profession: Lawyer
- Nickname: Tok Nan

Adenan bin Satem (Jawi: عدنان بن صتيم; 27 January 1944 – 11 January 2017), popularly known as Tok Nan, was a Malaysian politician and lawyer who served as the fifth chief minister of Sarawak from 2014 until his death in January 2017. A president of Parti Pesaka Bumiputera Bersatu during his tenure as chief minister, he represented Tanjong Datu in Sarawak State Legislative Assembly from 2006 to 2017.

Born in Kuching during the Empire of Japan, Adenan graduated from University of Adelaide. He is commonly known as the Father of Sarawak Unity (Bapa Perpaduan Sarawak).

== Early life and education ==
Adenan bin Satem was born on 27 January 1944 in Kuching, Sarawak, during the Japanese occupation near the end of World War II. He was the son of Satem Sulong, a Malay from Kampung Bandarsah in Kuching, and a customs officer who served under the British colonial administration and was later appointed as a counsellor to the Cobbold Commission during the formation of Malaysia in the early 1960s. His mother, Rabiah Usman, of Indian-Muslim and Chinese descent, was the second wife of Satem and also served as a religious teacher in their village. While pregnant with Adenan, his mother had to flee from the Japanese army.

Adenan was raised in a "large, close-knit family" and was the second youngest of seven children. His parents placed strong emphasis on education and moral values, choosing to send their children to top schools in Kuching. He began his early education at St. Anthony's School, Sarikei and later attended Sacred Heart School, Sibu. He continued his studies from primary five through upper six at St. Joseph's School in Kuching. In 1964, after completing his Higher School Certificate (HSC) with distinction, Adenan worked as a temporary teacher and later joined the Sarawak Tribune as a reporter for six months.

Encouraged by his mother and supported by a scholarship under the Colombo Plan, Adenan pursued legal studies at the University of Adelaide, South Australia. In 1969, after completing his legal studies, Adenan began his professional career as a prosecutor at the Crown Law Office in Adelaide. After graduating in 1970, he was appointed a Magistrate for one year and later served as assistant secretary at the Ministry of Primary Industries from 1972 to 1974.

== Political career ==
Adenan's political involvement was closely associated with Abdul Taib Mahmud, a prominent Sarawakian political figure at that time and later his brother-in-law. In 1972, Adenan married Aisha Zainab, the sister of Abdul Taib. In 1973, Adenan left the judiciary and joined the Ministry of Natural Resources in Kuala Lumpur as an assistant secretary, where he worked alongside Abdul Taib. In 1976, he returned to Sarawak and resumed his legal practice. That same year, he became actively involved with Parti Pesaka Bumiputera Bersatu (PBB), serving as a legal advisor and committee member. Adenan formally entered electoral politics in 1978 when he was selected as the Barisan Nasional (BN) candidate for a by-election in the Muara Tuang state constituency. He won the election by a majority of 2,797 votes, defeating Razali Sabang of PAJAR. He retained the seat in the 1979 Sarawak state election with an increased majority of 3,422 votes and again in 1983, defeating independent candidate Abang Ibrahim Abang Othman with a majority of 3,696 votes. Adenan continued to represent Muara Tuang in the Sarawak State Legislative Assembly until 2006, when he contested and won the Tanjong Datu seat.

Adenan was known for his active participation in legislative debates. In one of his notable speeches in the Sarawak State Legislative Assembly titled "The Eighth Day", he addressed environmental issues, remarking: "According to biblical knowledge, God created the world in six days, on the seventh day He rested. But on the eighth day, mankind messed it up." In 1985, Abdul Taib appointed Adenan as PBB's publicity chief as part of efforts to reduce the influence of former chief minister Abdul Rahman Ya'kub. Adenan played a key role in the 1987 Ming Court Affair, a political crisis arising from a power struggle between Abdul Taib and Abdul Rahman. The crisis led to the 1987 Sarawak state election after several ministers and deputy ministers loyal to Abdul Rahman resigned from Abdul Taib's cabinet. Adenan remained loyal to Abdul Taib, who ultimately retained power. Following the resignations, Adenan was appointed as the State Minister for Land Development in Abdul Taib's cabinet.

Adenan's political career expanded to the federal level when he won the Batang Sadong parliamentary seat in the 2004 Malaysian general election. After his victory, Prime Minister Abdullah Ahmad Badawi appointed him as the Minister of Natural Resources and Environment. However, Adenan resigned from his federal position in 2006 and returned to Sarawak. In the 2006 Sarawak state election, he contested and won the Tanjong Datu constituency. In 2010, Adenan was appointed as the special advisor to Chief Minister Abdul Taib Mahmud. The following year, in 2011, he was appointed as the State Minister with Special Functions.

== Chief Minister ==
On 9 February 2014, a closed-door meeting was held at the headquarters of Parti Pesaka Bumiputera Bersatu (PBB) involving Chief Minister Abdul Taib Mahmud, along with leaders of four component parties and members of the Sarawak Barisan Nasional supreme council. During the meeting, Abdul Taib expressed his intention to step down and proposed three PBB leaders as potential successors: Abang Johari, Awang Tengah Ali Hasan, and Adenan, who was then a member of the PBB supreme council. On 28 February 2014, after leading the state for 33 years, Abdul Taib officially resigned and named Adenan, also his advisor, as his successor. Adenan received the letter of appointment, took the oath of office, and signed the pledge of allegiance before Governor Abang Muhammad Salahuddin.

Following his resignation, Abdul Taib was appointed as the governor, succeeding Abang Muhammad Salahuddin whose term had ended. The appointment of Adenan as chief minister received support from former Prime Minister Mahathir Mohamad, who described him as "a suitable choice due to his extensive experience in both state and federal government administration."

=== Relationship with Peninsular Malaysia ===
As a chief minister, he clashed with federal government from time to time despite his party being part of the ruling federal coalition. He spoke openly about strengthening Sarawak's autonomy and called for higher state's share of petroleum royalty, much to the consternation of Putrajaya and the national oil company Petronas. Among other issues he disagreed with the federal government included official recognition for Unified Examination Certificate (UEC). During his capacity as chief minister, he also announced that Sarawak has adopted English as the official language of the state's administration, apart from Bahasa Malaysia. Malay language activists have criticised Adenan for making English as one of the official languages of Sarawak.

Adenan also advocated the policy of 90% of all teachers from Sarawak should be Sarawakians because only people from Sarawak are sensitive to local needs. He further suggest that educational matters should be handled by the state government so that the rural schools are better looked after. His stance has received criticism for promoting regionalism in a country. Sarawak also started to recognise UEC, in contrast to federal government that does not recognise the UEC certificate. Najib Razak, the then head of the federal government responded positively to demands made by Sarawak. He also appointed a committee, co-chaired by Nancy Shukri (Sarawak) an Anifah Aman (Sabah) to study the devolution of powers to Sabah and Sarawak under federal constitution. At the same time, the federal government leaders was preoccupied with various issues such as resignation of deputy prime minister Muhyiddin Yassin for protesting against 1Malaysia Development Berhad scandal, Sabah State Water Department corruption probe, and economic slowdown due to low prices of raw materials.

Meanwhile, the opposition leaders from the Peninsular Malaysia has held negative opinions regarding Adenan's pronouncements. Former prime minister Mahathir Mohamad stated that such acts would weaken the authority of the federal government. Other leaders such as Mohamad Sabu and Azmin Ali stated that Najib had failed to check Adenan from demanding more from the federal government. Adenan's action of barring opposition leaders from Peninsular Malaysia from campaigning in the state of Sarawak during 2016 Sarawak state election further exacerbates the negative sentiments from the opposition camps.

In February 2016, Adenan stated "If I don’t fight for Sarawak, who will?...Otherwise don’t call me chief minister, call me stupid chief minister." He established Sarawak Day, commemorating 22 July 1963 when which Sarawak became locally administered, as a public holiday. Despite his regionalist sentiment, Adenan opposed to the idea of secession from Malaysia, stating "it [joining Malaysia] was the wisest decision made by Sarawak 53 years ago".

== Health ==
Adenan's experience with heart disease was publicly acknowledged and something he addressed on several occasions. He once spoke about an incident in which his condition became life-threatening. In 2013, he experienced a heart-related illness that required medical treatment at National Heart Institute in Kuala Lumpur and National Heart Centre Singapore. During this time, his condition was described as critical, prompting him to call his children and grandchildren to his bedside. He subsequently received a pacemaker to help regulate his heartbeat. However, Adenan made a recovery.

In 2016, Adenan disclosed that he had stopped smoking in 2014 as a result of his heart condition. He also encouraged others, including senior colleagues, to consider making similar lifestyle changes.

== Death ==
On 11 January 2017, Adenan died of heart attack at the Sarawak Heart Centre, Kota Samarahan, aged 72 years old. The untimely demise is the first occurrence to a serving Sarawak Chief Minister. He was laid to rest at Samariang Muslim Cemetery in Kuching.

His death was mourned by Sarawakians throughout the week, and many leaders attended his funeral in Kuching.

== Credentials ==
His other credentials were:

- Chairman of Sarawak Foundation (1998–2017)
- Chairman of Swinburne University of Technology Sarawak Campus Council (2004–2017)
- Chairman of the Sarawak Malay Culture Foundation (Amanah Khairat Yayasan Budaya Melayu Sarawak)
- Board of directors for Sarawak Higher Education Foundation (SHEF)
- Board member of the Curtin University, Malaysia
- Chairman, Natural Resources and Environment Board Sarawak (NREB)
- Pro-Chancellor of the Swinburne University of Technology Sarawak Campus (2014–2017)

== Honours ==
=== Honours of Malaysia ===
- Malaysia
  - Commander of the Order of Loyalty to the Crown of Malaysia (PSM) – Tan Sri (2010)
- Malacca
  - Grand Commander of the Exalted Order of Malacca (DGSM) – Datuk Seri (2016)
- Sarawak
  - Knight Grand Commander of the Order of the Star of Sarawak (SBS) – Pehin Sri (Posthumous) (2017)
  - Knight Grand Commander of the Order of the Star of Hornbill Sarawak (DP) – Datuk Patinggi (2014)
  - Knight Commander of the Order of the Star of Hornbill Sarawak (DA) – Datuk Amar (2009)
  - Knight Commander of the Most Exalted Order of the Star of Sarawak (PNBS) – Dato Sri (1990)
  - Companion of the Most Exalted Order of the Star of Sarawak (JBS) (1986)
  - Meritorious Service Medal (Silver) (PPB)

Political offices
Preceded by Abdul Taib Mahmud	Chief Minister of Sarawak; 2014–2017	Succeeded by Abang Abdul Rahman Zohari Abang Openg
