= Idris Buang =

Malaysian politician

Yang Berhormat Dato Haji Idris Buang MLA PSBS DIMP AMN
- ايدريس بواڠ

Deputy Speaker of Sarawak State Legislative Assembly
- Incumbent
- Assumed office 2022
- Governor: Abdul Taib Mahmud (2022-2024); Wan Junaidi Tuanku Jaafar (since 2024)
- Speaker: Mohamad Asfia Awang Nassar
- Succeeded by: Gerawat Gala

Member of the Sarawak State Legislative Assembly for Muara Tuang
- Incumbent
- Assumed office 2016
- Preceded by: Mohamad Ali Mahmud

Personal details
- Born: Idris bin Buang Sarawak
- Citizenship: Malaysian
- Party: PBB
- Other political affiliations: Barisan Nasional (till 2018); Gabungan Parti Sarawak (since 2018)
- Occupation: Politician
- Profession: Lawyer

Idris bin Buang is a Malaysian politician from PBB. He has served as the Member of the Sarawak State Legislative Assembly for Muara Tuang since 2016. He is also the Deputy Speaker of Sarawak State Legislative Assembly.

== Election results ==
Sarawak State Legislative Assembly
Year	Constituency	Candidate	Votes	Pct.	Opponent(s)	Votes	Pct.	Ballots cast	Majority	Turnout
2016	N16 Muara Tuang	Idris Buang (PBB)	10,086	81.61%	Zulkipli Ramzi (PAS)	1,508	12.20%	12,688	8,578	78.39%
2016	N16 Muara Tuang	Idris Buang (PBB)	10,086	81.61%	Abang Abdul Halil Abang Naili (AMANAH)	765	6.19%	12,688	8,578	78.39%
2021	N16 Muara Tuang	Idris Buang (PBB)	8,435	63.63%	Ismawi Mohammad (IND)	2,198	16.58%	13,599	6,237	72.94%
2021	N16 Muara Tuang	Idris Buang (PBB)	8,435	63.63%	Yakub Khalid (PSB)	1,838	13.86%	13,599	6,237	72.94%
2021	N16 Muara Tuang	Idris Buang (PBB)	8,435	63.63%	Hipni Sulaiman (SEDAR)	357	2.69%	13,599	6,237	72.94%
2021	N16 Muara Tuang	Idris Buang (PBB)	8,435	63.63%	Daud Eali (AMANAH)	239	1.80%	13,599	6,237	72.94%
2021	N16 Muara Tuang	Idris Buang (PBB)	8,435	63.63%	Sagandin Sulaiman (PBK)	190	1.43%	13,599	6,237	72.94%

== Honours ==
- Malaysia :
  - Member of the Order of the Defender of the Realm (AMN) (2000)
- Pahang :
  - Knight Companion of the Order of the Crown of Pahang (DIMP) – Dato’ (2004)
- Sarawak :
  - Commander of the Most Exalted Order of the Star of Sarawak (PSBS) – Dato (2019)
