= Jacob Dungau Sagan =

Malaysian politician

Yang Berbahagia Dato Jacob Dungau Sagan PSBS JBS KMN
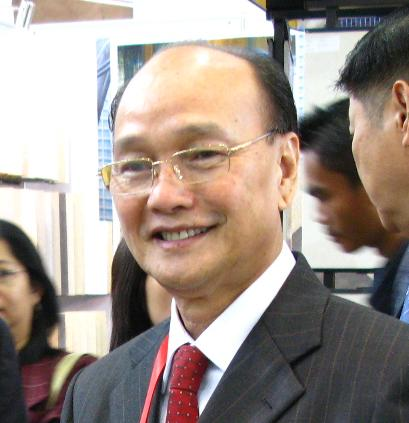

Deputy Minister of International Trade and Industry
- In office 19 March 2008 – 15 May 2013 Serving with Liew Vui Keong (2008–2009); Mukhriz Mahathir (2009–2013)
- Monarchs: Mizan Zainal Abidin; Abdul Halim
- Prime Minister: Abdullah Ahmad Badawi; Najib Razak
- Minister: Muhyiddin Yassin (2008–2009); Mustapa Mohamed (2009–2013)
- Preceded by: Ng Lip Yong
- Succeeded by: Hamim Samuri
- Constituency: Baram

Senior Vice-President of the Sarawak Progressive Democratic Party
- Incumbent
- Assumed office 2001
- Constituency: Baram

Member of the Malaysian Parliament for Baram
- In office 24 April 1995 – 5 May 2013
- Preceded by: Harrison Ngau Laing (IND)
- Succeeded by: Anyi Ngau (SPDP–BN)
- Majority: 5,723 (1995); 6,872 (1999); 3,310 (2004); 4,044 (2008)

Personal details
- Born: 26 September 1946 (age 79) Long Anap, Ulu Baram, Crown Colony of Sarawak (now Sarawak, Malaysia)
- Party: Sarawak Progressive Democratic Party (SPDP)
- Other political affiliations: Barisan Nasional (BN)
- Spouse: Datin Winnie Jolly
- Occupation: Politician

Jacob Dungau Sagan (born 26 September 1946) was the Member of Parliament for Baram, Sarawak from 1995 to 2013 and was the first Kenyah person to be appointed as a deputy cabinet minister in Malaysia.

== Personal life ==
Jacob was born in Long Anap, Ulu Baram, Sarawak. He is of the Kenyah tribe from the Orang Ulu ethnic community. He is able to speak and write English, Bahasa Malaysia (Sarawak Malay dialect), Kenyah and Kayan fluently. He also speaks the Iban and Penan languages.

Jacob holds a Bachelor of Agriculture Science from the University of Adelaide, South Australia in 1970, Postgraduate Diploma in Agricultural Education from Worcester College of Higher Education, UK (1980) and Certificate in Education, Wolverhampton Polytechnic UK (1980/1981). He continued his studies in 1985 and obtained the Certificate in Management form Asian Institute of Management. In 1991, he received a Certificate in Planning and Managing Rural Development from Asian Institute of Technology, Thailand.

He was awarded the Senior Service Fellows from John F. Kennedy School of Government, Harvard University, Massachusetts, USA in 1994. The course is equivalent to Masters in Management.

He is well trained in the art of public speaking and communication skills. He participated in Toastmasters International and was conferred the award of a Competent Toastmaster (CTM). Toastmasters International is a worldwide organisation dedicated to promote the art of public speaking. He used to conduct seminars and courses in the art of public speaking to various government departments.

== Family ==
His father was the late Tua Kampung Taman Pulo Sagan and ex-Councillor for Baram District Council for 6 years. He is married to Datin Winnie Jolly (of mixed Iban and Chinese origins). She is one of the supreme council members of SPDP representing the women's wing quota and was previously one of the elected Sarawak National Party (SNAP) Ketua Wanita 1999–2002 and Barisan Nasional (BN) Wanita member at state and national levels.

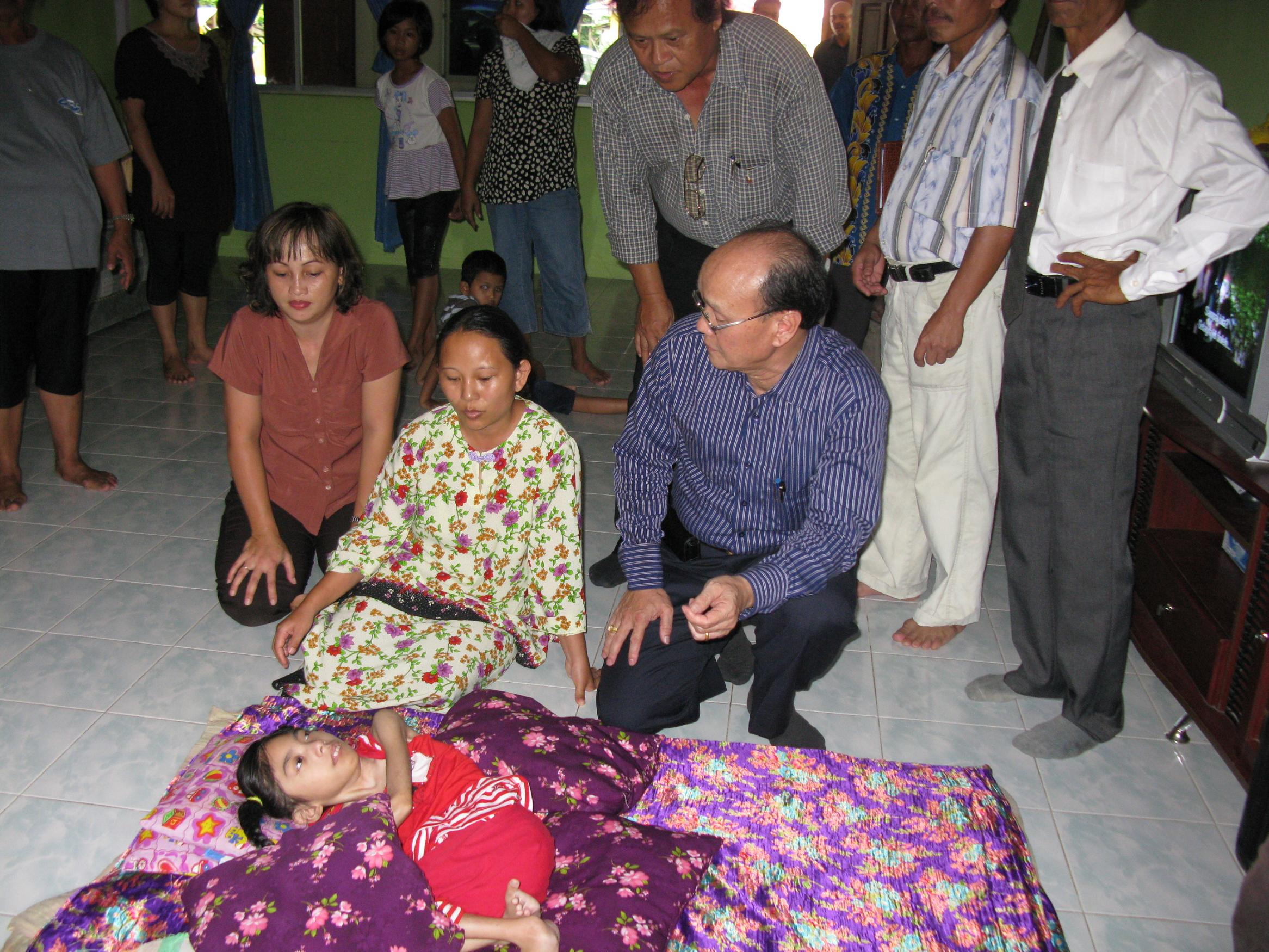
Jacob visits his constituency regularly in Baram, Sarawak

== The Civil Service and Recognitions ==
On 6 July 1970, Jacob joined the Department of Agriculture, Sarawak. When he was appointed as the Assistant Director of Agriculture (Farmers Institution) (ADFI), he headed the Farmers Institution (FI) Branch in Sarawak. He conducted various leadership programmes in the planning, development, program implementation, monitoring and evaluation of the Farmers Organisation development in the State of Sarawak; covering one State Farmers Organisation and 26 Area Farmers Organisation which constitutes 100,000 Farmer members. The ADFI is responsible for four main divisions of work which are: Planning and development; Farmers Organisation management; Auditing and Accounting; and Business Management Services. Apart from that, he served in various posts in the Department of Agriculture Sarawak which included Youth Services, Agricultural Extension Services, Divisional Agriculture Officer, Farmers Training as well as staff training.

== Political career ==
Jacob entered Parliament at the 1995 election, as a member of the Sarawak National Party. He left the party in 2002, with a group of other politicians, to found the Sarawak Progressive Democratic Party (SPDP). He was re-elected to Parliament in 1999, 2004 and 2008, although was dropped as the Barisan Nasional candidate for the Baram seat at the 2013 election. For his final term in office, from 2008 to 2013, he was a Deputy Minister for International Trade and Industry.

== Election results ==
Parliament of Malaysia
Year	Constituency	Candidate	Votes	Pct	Opponent(s)	Votes	Pct	Ballots cast	Majority	Turnout
1995	P191 Baram	Jacob Dungau Sagan (SNAP)	8,829	68.20%	Harrison Ngau Laing (PBS)	3,106	23.99%	13,158	5,723	50.09%
1995	P191 Baram	Jacob Dungau Sagan (SNAP)	8,829	68.20%	Luhat Wan (IND)	1,010	7.80%	13,158	5,723	50.09%
1999	P192 Baram	Jacob Dungau Sagan (PDP)	8,609	83.21%	Sedi Li (IND)	1,737	16.79%	10,619	6,872	42.74%
2004	P218 Baram	Jacob Dungau Sagan (PDP)	7,551	64.03%	Kebing Wan (SNAP)	4,241	35.97%	11,973	3,310	47.21%
2008	P220 Baram	Jacob Dungau Sagan (PDP)	7,996	66.92%	Kebing Wan (IND)	3,952	33.08%	12,126	4,044	49.65%

== Honours ==
- Malaysia
  - Officer of the Order of the Defender of the Realm (KMN) (1998)
- Sarawak
  - Commander of the Order of the Star of Sarawak (PSBS) – Dato (2003)
  - Companion of the Order of the Star of Sarawak (JBS) (1998)
