= Gerawat Gala =

Malaysian politician

Yang Berhormat Datuk Dato Gerawat Gala MLA PGBK PSBS

Deputy Minister in the Premier's Department for Labour, Immigration and Project Monitoring
- Incumbent
- Assumed office 2022
- Governor: Abdul Taib Mahmud (2022-2024); Wan Junaidi Tuanku Jaafar (since 2024)
- Premier: Abang Johari
- Preceded by: Position established

Deputy Speaker of Sarawak State Legislative Assembly
- In office 2006–2022
- Governor: Abang Muhammad Salahuddin (2006-2014); Abdul Taib Mahmud (2014-2022)
- Speaker: Mohamad Asfia Awang Nassar
- Succeeded by: Idris Buang

Member of the Sarawak State Legislative Assembly for Mulu
- Incumbent
- Assumed office 2016
- Preceded by: Constituency created

Personal details
- Born: Gerawat Gala; 1958 (age 67–68) Sarawak
- Citizenship: Malaysian
- Party: PBB
- Other political affiliations: Barisan Nasional (till 2018); Gabungan Parti Sarawak (since 2018)
- Occupation: Politician

Gerawat Gala is a Malaysian politician from PBB. He has served as the Member of the Sarawak State Legislative Assembly for Mulu since 2016. He is also the Deputy Minister in the Premier's Department for Labour, Immigration and Project Monitoring since 2022.

== Corporate career ==
Gerawat was the CEO of Sarawak Energy Group.

== NGO career ==
Gerawat is the Chairman of Miri branch of Sarawak United National Youth Organisation.

== Political career ==
Gerawat is one of the Vice Presidents of PBB. He served as Deputy Speaker of Sarawak State Legislative Assembly from 2006 to 2022.

== Election results ==
Sarawak State Legislative Assembly
Year	Constituency	Candidate	Votes	Pct.	Opponent(s)	Votes	Pct.	Ballots cast	Majority	Turnout
2016	N78 Mulu	Gerawat Gala (PBB)	3,198	61.08%	Pauls Baya (PKR)	1,490	28.46%	5,356	1,708	62.28%
2016	N78 Mulu	Gerawat Gala (PBB)	3,198	61.08%	Paul Anyie Raja (DAP)	309	5.90%	5,356	1,708	62.28%
2016	N78 Mulu	Gerawat Gala (PBB)	3,198	61.08%	Roland Dom Mattu (IND)	239	4.56%	5,356	1,708	62.28%
2021	N78 Mulu	Gerawat Gala (PBB)	3,731	66.67%	Son Radu (PSB)	856	15.30%	5,802	2,875	60.61%
2021	N78 Mulu	Gerawat Gala (PBB)	3,731	66.67%	Roland Engan (PKR)	810	14.47%	5,802	2,875	60.61%
2021	N78 Mulu	Gerawat Gala (PBB)	3,731	66.67%	Richard Ibuh (PBK)	199	3.56%	5,802	2,875	60.61%

== Honours ==
- Sarawak :
  - Commander of the Most Exalted Order of the Star of Sarawak (PSBS) – Dato (2015)
  - Commander of the Order of the Star of Hornbill Sarawak (PGBK) – Datuk (2022)
