= Muara Tuang (state constituency) =

State constituency in Sarawak, Malaysia

Muara Tuang (N16)
Sarawak constituency

State constituency
- Legislature: Sarawak State Legislative Assembly
MLA
Vacant
- Constituency created: 1968
- First contested: 1969
- Last contested: 2026

Muara Tuang is a state constituency in Sarawak, Malaysia, that has been represented in the Sarawak State Legislative Assembly since 1969.

The state constituency was created in the 1968 redistribution and is mandated to return a single member to the Sarawak State Legislative Assembly under the first past the post voting system.

== Demographics ==
Ethnic breakdown of Muara Tuang's electorate as of 2022
1. Malay-Muslim bumiputera (68.2%)
2. Sarawak bumiputera (25.5%)
3. Chinese (5.70%)
4. Other ethnicities (0.60%)

== History ==
As of 2020, Muara Tuang has a population of 65,026 people.

=== Polling districts ===
According to the gazette issued on 31 October 2022, the Muara Tuang constituency has a total of 7 polling districts.

State constituency	Polling Districts	Code	Location
Muara Tuang (N16)	Empila	197/16/01	Bilik Gerakan ERT Kpg. Nakong; SK Kpg. Mang; SK Kpg. Melayu; Dewan Serbaguna Kpg. Bangka Semong; Dewan Serbaguna Kpg. Sg. Mata; Surau Kpg. Naie Baru; Dewan Serbaguna Kpg Sg Mata; Dewan Sri Villa Kpg. Empila; SK Niup; Dewan Serbaguna Kpg. Tanjung Parang; (Ruang A) Dewan Serbaguna Kpg. Semawang; SK Kg Tanjung Tuang
Muara Tuang (N16)	Tanju	197/16/02	SJK (C) Chung Hua Beliong
Muara Tuang (N16)	Batu Blat	197/16/03	SK Kpg. Baru
Muara Tuang (N16)	Tuang	197/16/04	SK Dato Traoh Muara Tuang; Dewan Kpg. Muara Tuang; SK Dato Mohd Musa; Dewan Sri Payong Kpg. Endap; SK Pinang; SK Meranek; SK Kampung Rembus
Muara Tuang (N16)	Semaran	197/16/05	SK Tanah Merah; Balai Raya Kpg. Segenam; Dewan Serbaguna Kpg. Raeh; TADIKA KEMAS Kpg. Soh; SK Gemang; SJK (C) Chung Hua Batu 29 Jln. Kuching / Serian
Muara Tuang (N16)	Ladang Samarahan	197/16/06	SK Lubok Antu / Reban; SK Pati; SK Samarahan Estate; Dewan Kpg. Seniawan; SK Plaman Baki / Menaul; Balairaya Kpg. Tian Mawang; Balairaya Kpg. Murud Plaman
Muara Tuang (N16)	Melaban	197/15/07	Dewan Kpg. Sebayor; Balai Raya Kpg. Melaban (Ruang A); Balai Raya Kpg. Melaban (Ruang B); SK Plaie D C; SK St Michael

=== Representation history ===
Members of the Legislative Assembly for Muara Tuang
Assembly	No	Years	Member	Party
Constituency created
8th	N08	1970-1973	Mohamad Musa	BUMIPUTERA
8th	N08	1973-1974	Mohamad Musa	BN (PBB)
9th	N08	1974-1979	Mohamad Musa	BN (PBB)
9th	N08	1979	Adenan Satem	BN (PBB)
10th	N08	1979-1983	Adenan Satem	BN (PBB)
11th	N08	1983-1987	Adenan Satem	BN (PBB)
12th	N08	1987-1991	Adenan Satem	BN (PBB)
13th	N13	1991-1996	Adenan Satem	BN (PBB)
14th	N13	1996-2001	Adenan Satem	BN (PBB)
15th	N13	2001-2006	Adenan Satem	BN (PBB)
16th	N15	2006-2011	Mohamad Ali Mahmud	BN (PBB)
17th	N15	2011-2016	Mohamad Ali Mahmud	BN (PBB)
18th	N16	2016-2018	Idris Buang	BN (PBB)
18th	N16	2018-2021	Idris Buang	GPS (PBB)
19th	N16	2021–2026	Idris Buang	GPS (PBB)

== Election results ==
Sarawak state election, 2026
Party	Candidate	Votes	%	∆%
GPS				▲
PH				▲
Total valid votes				
Total rejected ballots				
Unreturned ballots				
Turnout				
Registered electors				
Majority				

Sarawak state election, 2021
Party	Candidate	Votes	%	∆%
GPS	Idris Buang	8,435	63.63	▲63.63
Independent	Ismawi Mohammad	2,198	16.58	▲16.58
PSB	Yakub Khalid	1,838	13.86	▲13.86
Parti Sedar Rakyat Sarawak	Hipni Sulaiman	357	2.69	▲2.69
Amanah	Daud Eali	239	1.80	▼4.39
PBK	Sagandin Sulaiman	190	1.43	▲1.43
Total valid votes		13,257	100.00	
Total rejected ballots		259		
Unreturned ballots		83		
Turnout		13,599	72.94	▼5.45
Registered electors		18,644		
Majority		6,237	47.05	▼22.37
GPS gain from BN		Swing		?
Source(s) https://lom.agc.gov.my/ilims/upload/portal/akta/outputp/1718688/PUB687.pdf

Sarawak state election, 2016
Party	Candidate	Votes	%	∆%
BN	Idris Buang	10,086	81.61	▲4.06
PAS	Zulkipli Ramzi	1,508	12.20	▼10.25
Amanah	Abang Abdul Halil Abang Naili	765	6.19	▲6.19
Total valid votes		12,359	100.00	
Total rejected ballots		269		
Unreturned ballots		60		
Turnout		12,688	78.39	▲0.97
Registered electors		16,186		
Majority		8,578	69.41	▲14.32
BN hold		Swing		
Source(s) "Federal Government Gazette - Notice of Contested Election, State Legislative Assembly of the State of Sarawak [P.U. (B) 190/2016]" (PDF). Attorney General's Chambers of Malaysia. 25 April 2016. Archived from the original (PDF) on 12 June 2017. "Senarai Calon yang Disahkan Layak Bertanding Pilihan Raya Dewan Undangan Negeri ke-11". Election Commission of Malaysia. 25 April 2016. Archived from the original on 25 April 2016.

Sarawak state election, 2011
Party	Candidate	Votes	%	∆%
BN	Mohamad Ali Mahmud	11,039	77.55	▼2.57
PAS	Noraini Hamzah	3,196	22.45	▲22.45
Total valid votes		14,235	100.00	
Total rejected ballots		299		
Unreturned ballots		36		
Turnout		14,570	77.42	▲4.92
Registered electors		18,820		
Majority		7,843	55.10	▼9.36
BN hold		Swing		
Source(s) "Federal Government Gazette - Results of Contested Election and Statements of the Poll after the Official Addition of Votes Sarawak [P.U. (B) 245/2011]" (PDF). Attorney General's Chambers of Malaysia. 29 April 2011.

Sarawak state election, 2006
Party	Candidate	Votes	%	∆%
BN	Mohamad Ali Mahmud	7,863	80.12	▼9.26
PKR	Abang Ibrahim Abang Othman	1,536	15.65	▲15.65
Independent	Jong Nyuk Chan	415	4.23	▲4.23
Total valid votes		9,814	100.00	
Total rejected ballots		195		
Unreturned ballots		362		
Turnout		10,371	72.50	▼5.18
Registered electors		14,303		
Majority		6,327	64.47	▼14.31
BN hold		Swing		

Sarawak state election, 2001
Party	Candidate	Votes	%	∆%
BN	Adenan Satem	11,017	89.38	▲1.30
Independent	Suhaili Hamid	1,309	10.62	▼1.30
Total valid votes		12,326	100.00	
Total rejected ballots		298		
Unreturned ballots		593		
Turnout		13,217	77.68	▼1.67
Registered electors		17,015		
Majority		9,708	78.76	▲2.60
BN hold		Swing		

Sarawak state election, 1996
Party	Candidate	Votes	%	∆%
On the nomination day, Adenan Satem won uncontested.
BN	Adenan Satem			
Total valid votes			100.00	
Total rejected ballots				
Unreturned ballots				
Turnout				
Registered electors		17,231		
Majority				
BN hold		Swing		

Sarawak state election, 1991
Party	Candidate	Votes	%	∆%
BN	Adenan Satem	9,566	88.08	▲13.33
NEGARA	Mohamad Tahir Sham	1,294	11.92	▼13.33
Total valid votes		10,860	100.00	
Total rejected ballots		205		
Unreturned ballots		785		
Turnout		11,850	79.35	▼2.40
Registered electors		14,933		
Majority		8,272	76.17	▲26.66
BN hold		Swing		

Sarawak state election, 1987
Party	Candidate	Votes	%	∆%
BN	Adenan Satem	5,196	74.75	▼5.47
PERMAS	Abdul Rahman Hamzah	1,755	25.25	▲10.65
Total valid votes		6,951	100.00	
Total rejected ballots		80		
Unreturned ballots		0		
Turnout		7,031	82.48	▲4.32
Registered electors		8,525		
Majority		3,441	49.50	▼16.13
BN hold		Swing		

Sarawak state election, 1983
Party	Candidate	Votes	%	∆%
BN	Adenan Satem	4,518	80.22	▼3.78
Independent	Abang Ibrahim Abang Othman	822	14.60	▼1.40
Sarawak Demokratik Bersatu	Abang Mohd Kassim Abang Mohd Taha	292	5.18	▲5.18
Total valid votes		5,632	100.00	
Total rejected ballots		136		
Unreturned ballots		0		
Turnout		5,768	78.04	▲1.35
Registered electors		7,391		
Majority		3,696	65.63	▼2.38
BN hold		Swing		

Sarawak state election, 1979
Party	Candidate	Votes	%	∆%
BN	Adenan Satem	4,227	84.00	▲2.85
Parti Anak Jati Sarawak	Bujang Ali Nor	805	16.00	▼2.85
Total valid votes		5,032	100.00	
Total rejected ballots		72		
Unreturned ballots		0		
Turnout		5,104	77.17	
Registered electors		6,614		
Majority		3,422	68.01	▲5.64
BN hold		Swing		

Sarawak state by-election, 20 January 1979 Upon the death of incumbent, Mohamad Musa
Party	Candidate	Votes	%	∆%
BN	Adenan Satem	3,643	81.15	▲14.19
Parti Anak Jati Sarawak	Razali Sabang	846	18.85	▲18.15
Total valid votes		4,489	100.00	
Total rejected ballots				
Unreturned ballots				
Turnout				
Registered electors				
Majority		2,797	62.31	▲26.47
BN hold		Swing		

Sarawak state election, 1974
Party	Candidate	Votes	%	∆%
BN	Mohamad Musa	2,468	66.96	▲20.66
SNAP	Mohamad Tahir Sham	1,147	31.12	▲13.95
Parti Bisamah Sarawak	Frank Dustine Sirau	71	1.93	▲1.93
Total valid votes		3,686	100.00	
Total rejected ballots		417		
Unreturned ballots		0		
Turnout		4,103	80.58	▼8.42
Registered electors		5,092		
Majority		1,321	35.84	▲19.04
BN gain from PBB		Swing		?

Sarawak state election, 1969
Party	Candidate	Votes	%
PBB	Mohamad Musa	1,934	46.30
SUPP	Chung Kok Chiong	1,232	29.49
SNAP	Abang Othman	717	17.17
Independent	Arthur Ernest Muda	294	7.04
Total valid votes		4,177	100.00
Total rejected ballots		175	
Unreturned ballots		0	
Turnout		4,352	89.00
Registered electors		4,890	
Majority		702	16.81
This was a new constituency created.
