= Tanjong Datu (state constituency) =

State constituency in Sarawak, Malaysia

Tanjong Datu (N03)
Sarawak constituency

State constituency
- Legislature: Sarawak State Legislative Assembly
MLA
Vacant
- Constituency created: 1987
- First contested: 1991
- Last contested: 2026

Tanjong Datu is a state constituency in Sarawak, Malaysia, that has been represented in the Sarawak State Legislative Assembly since 1991.

The state constituency was created in the 1987 redistribution and is mandated to return a single member to the Sarawak State Legislative Assembly under the first past the post voting system.

== Demographics ==
Ethnic breakdown of Tanjong Datu's electorate as of 2022
1. Malay-Muslim bumiputera (53.3%)
2. Sarawak bumiputera (28.4%)
3. Chinese (17.4%)
4. Other ethnicities (0.90%)

== History ==
As of 2025, Tanjong Datu (including Lundu area) has a population of 46,187 people.

=== Polling districts ===
According to the gazette issued on 31 October 2022, the Tanjong Datu constituency has a total of 15 polling districts.

State constituency	Polling Districts	Code	Location
Tanjong Datu（N03）	Telok Melano	193/03/01	SK Telok Melano
Tanjong Datu（N03）	Pueh	193/03/02	SK Pueh
Tanjong Datu（N03）	Sebat	193/03/03	SK Kpg. Sebat
Tanjong Datu（N03）	Sematan	193/03/04	SJK (C) Chung Hua Sematan
Tanjong Datu（N03）	Seling	193/03/05	SK Bumiputera Lundu
Tanjong Datu（N03）	Stunggang	193/03/06	SJ Kpg. Stunggang Lundu
Tanjong Datu（N03）	Lundu	193/03/07	SJK (C) Chung Hua Lundu
Tanjong Datu（N03）	Perigi	193/03/08	SJK (C) Chung Hua Selarat / Serayan
Tanjong Datu（N03）	Sekambal	193/03/09	SK Lebai Mentali Kpg. Sekambal
Tanjong Datu（N03）	Bajo	193/03/10	SK Siar Campuran Kpg. Bajo Lundu
Tanjong Datu（N03）	Kampung Sebemban	193/03/11	SMK Lundu
Tanjong Datu（N03）	Temelan	193/03/12	SK Temelan / Stunggang
Tanjong Datu（N03）	Sampadi	193/03/13	SK Kpg. Sampadi
Tanjong Datu（N03）	Stoh	193/03/14	SK Stoh
Tanjong Datu（N03）	Rambungan	193/03/15	Balai Raya Kpg. Rambungan; Dewan Masyarakat Kpg. Sg. Belian

=== Representation history ===
Members of the Legislative Assembly for Tanjong Datu
Assembly	No	Years	Member	Party
Constituency created from Lundu
13th	N01	1991-1996	Ramsay Noel Jitam	BN (SUPP)
14th	N01	1996-2001	Ramsay Noel Jitam	BN (SUPP)
15th	N01	2001-2006	Ranum Mina	BN (SUPP)
16th	N03	2006-2011	Adenan Satem	BN (PBB)
17th	N03	2011-2016	Adenan Satem	BN (PBB)
18th	N03	2016-2017	Adenan Satem	BN (PBB)
18th	N03	2017-2018	Jamilah Anu	BN (PBB)
18th	N03	2018-2021	Jamilah Anu	GPS (PBB)
19th	N03	2021–2026	Azizul Annuar Adenan	GPS (PBB)

== Election results ==
Sarawak state election, 2026
Party	Candidate	Votes	%	∆%
GPS				▲
PH				▲
Total valid votes				
Total rejected ballots				
Unreturned ballots				
Turnout				
Registered electors				
Majority				

Sarawak state election, 2021
Party	Candidate	Votes	%	∆%
GPS	Azizul Annuar Adenan	5,423	79.39	▲79.39
PSB	Jery'in Fauzi	921	13.48	▲13.48
Independent	Abdul Talib Baee	261	3.82	▲3.82
PBK	Goem Pijar	226	3.31	▲3.31
Total valid votes		6,977	100.00	
Total rejected ballots		134		
Unreturned ballots		12		
Turnout		7,123	62.57	▼6.63
Registered electors		11,384		
Majority		4,502	64.53	▼30.07
GPS gain from BN		Swing		?
Source(s) https://lom.agc.gov.my/ilims/upload/portal/akta/outputp/1718688/PUB687.pdf

Sarawak state by-election, 18 February 2017 Upon the death of incumbent, Adenan Satem
Party	Candidate	Votes	%	∆%
BN	Jamilah Anu	6,573	96.51	▲3.36
PBDS Baru	Rapelson Richard Hamit	130	1.91	▲1.91
STAR	Johnny Bob Aput	108	1.59	▲1.59
Total valid votes		6,811	100.00	
Total rejected ballots		80		
Unreturned ballots		1		
Turnout		6,892	69.20	▼0.87
Registered electors		9,959		
Majority		6,443	94.60	▲8.31
BN hold		Swing		
Source(s) "Federal Government Gazette - Notice of Contested Election - By-election of the State Legislative Assembly of N.03 Tanjong Datu for the State of Sarawak [P.U. (B) 87/2017]" (PDF). Attorney General's Chambers of Malaysia. 6 February 2017. Archived from the original (PDF) on 2017-06-13. "Federal Government Gazette - Results of Contested Election and Statement of the Poll after the Official Addition of Votes for the By-election of N.03 Tanjong Datu [P.U. (B) 110/2017]" (PDF). Attorney General's Chambers of Malaysia. 24 February 2017. Archived from the original (PDF) on 2017-06-13.

Sarawak state election, 2016
Party	Candidate	Votes	%	∆%
BN	Adenan Satem	6,360	93.15	▲15.54
PKR	Jazolkipli Numan	468	6.85	▲6.85
Total valid votes		6,828	100.00	
Total rejected ballots		77		
Unreturned ballots		31		
Turnout		6,936	70.07	▲0.55
Registered electors		9,899		
Majority		5,892	86.29	▲27.12
BN hold		Swing		
Source(s) "Federal Government Gazette - Notice of Contested Election, State Legislative Assembly of the State of Sarawak [P.U. (B) 190/2016]" (PDF). Attorney General's Chambers of Malaysia. 25 April 2016. Archived from the original (PDF) on 2017-06-12. "Senarai Calon yang Disahkan Layak Bertanding Pilihan Raya Dewan Undangan Negeri ke-11". Election Commission of Malaysia. 25 April 2016. Archived from the original on 25 April 2016.

Sarawak state election, 2011
Party	Candidate	Votes	%	∆%
BN	Adenan Satem	4,218	77.61	▼7.97
PAS	Nani Sahari	1,002	18.44	▲18.44
Independent	Gilbert Asson Kulong	215	3.95	▲3.95
Total valid votes		5,435	100.00	
Total rejected ballots		62		
Unreturned ballots		20		
Turnout		5,517	69.52	▲2.03
Registered electors		7,936		
Majority		3,216	59.17	▼18.71
BN hold		Swing		
Source(s) "Federal Government Gazette - Results of Contested Election and Statements of the Poll after the Official Addition of Votes Sarawak [P.U. (B) 245/2011]" (PDF). Attorney General's Chambers of Malaysia. 29 April 2011.

Sarawak state election, 2006
Party	Candidate	Votes	%	∆%
BN	Adenan Satem	4,545	85.58	▲9.08
PKR	Sobey Daud	409	7.70	▲4.04
Independent	Larry Dominic Linang	357	6.72	▲6.72
Total valid votes		5,311	100.00	
Total rejected ballots		66		
Unreturned ballots		4		
Turnout		5,381	67.49	▼3.56
Registered electors		7,973		
Majority		4,136	77.88	▲8.93
BN hold		Swing		

Sarawak state election, 2001
Party	Candidate	Votes	%	∆%
BN	Ranum Mina	5,606	76.50	▲7.97
Independent	Chin Yoo Ngim	552	7.53	▲7.53
Independent	Sulaiman Aban	508	6.93	▲6.93
DAP	Teo Chung Chai	394	5.38	▲5.38
PKR	Awang Asmadi Awang Ahmad	268	3.66	▲3.66
Total valid votes		7,328	100.00	
Total rejected ballots		107		
Unreturned ballots		17		
Turnout		7,452	71.05	▼1.32
Registered electors		10,488		
Majority		5,053	68.95	▲24.50
BN hold		Swing		

Sarawak state election, 1996
Party	Candidate	Votes	%	∆%
BN	Ramsay Noel Jitam	5,268	68.53	▲16.52
Independent	Chen Yiew Zean	1,851	24.08	▲24.08
Independent	Jehim Milos	568	7.39	▲7.39
Total valid votes		7,687	100.00	
Total rejected ballots		92		
Unreturned ballots		268		
Turnout		8,047	72.37	▼5.35
Registered electors		11,120		
Majority		3,417	44.45	▲36.33
BN hold		Swing		

Sarawak state election, 1991
Party	Candidate	Votes	%
BN	Ramsay Noel Jitam	5,088	52.01
PBDS	Sidi Munan	4,294	43.89
Independent	Ahmed Abg Ali	268	2.74
NEGARA	Aton Kajit	133	1.36
Total valid votes		9,783	100.00
Total rejected ballots		97	
Unreturned ballots		353	
Turnout		10,233	77.72
Registered electors		13,167	
Majority		794	8.12
This was a new constituency created.
