= Mulu (state constituency) =

Mulu (N78)
Sarawak constituency

State constituency
- Legislature: Sarawak State Legislative Assembly
MLA
Vacant
- Constituency created: 2015
- First contested: 2016
- Last contested: 2026

Mulu is a state constituency in Sarawak, Malaysia, that has been represented in the Sarawak State Legislative Assembly since 2016.

The state constituency was created in the 2015 redistribution and is mandated to return a single member to the Sarawak State Legislative Assembly under the first past the post voting system.

== Demographics ==
Ethnic breakdown of Mulu's electorate as of 2022
1. Sarawak bumiputera (94.7%)
2. Chinese (2.70%)
3. Malay-Muslim bumiputera (1.00%)
4. Other ethnicities (1.50%)

== History ==
As of 2020, Mulu has a population of 14,655 people.

=== Polling districts ===
According to the gazette issued on 31 October 2022, the Mulu constituency has a total of 10 polling districts.

State constituency	Polling Districts	Code	Location
Mulu (N78)	Lubok Nibong	220/78/01	SK Lubok Nibong; SJK (C) Hua Nam
Mulu (N78)	Puyut	220/78/02	SK Sg. Setapang; RH Lalo Selejau; RH Jugah Sg. Belasoi; RH Blalang Anak Atom Sg Sengkabang; RH Lansam Sg. Dabai; SK Puyut; SK Rumah Gudang; SK Lg. Linei; RH Adang Sg Ridan; SK Sg. Brit; RH Ridab Ak Selat Sg. Pasir
Mulu (N78)	Limotu	220/78/03	SK Lg. Sait; RH TK John Jau Wan Lg. Semiang; SK Lg. Tungan; SK Lg. Moh; RH TK Lucas Ngau Lg. Selaan Tepuan; SK Lg. Mengkaba; SK Lg. Jekitan; SK Lg. Jeeh; SK Lg. Lamei; SK Lio Mato
Mulu (N78)	Tutoh	220/78/04	SK Batu Bungan Sg. Melinau; SK Lg. Seidan; SK Penghulu Baya Mallang; SK Long Panai; RH Tk Christhopher Pusu Yin Lg. Ukok; RH Tk Asong Jaban; SK Kuala Tutoh
Mulu (N78)	Long Peluan	220/78/05	RH TK Tuloi Bayo Lg. Peluan; SK Lg Banga
Mulu (N78)	Bario	220/78/06	SK Bario
Mulu (N78)	Pa'Lungan	220/78/07	RH TK Bujang Pa' Ukat; RH TK Maren Pu'un Pa' Lungan
Mulu (N78)	Dano	220/78/08	RH TK Barang Lugun; SMK Bario
Mulu (N78)	Remudu	220/78/09	SK Pa' Dalih; RH TK Maren Lugun Remudu
Mulu (N78)	Lellang	220/78/10	RH TK Amat Aran Lg. Lellang

=== Representation history ===
Members of the Legislative Assembly for Mulu
Assembly	No	Years	Member	Party
Constituency created from Telang Usan and Ba'kelalan
18th	N78	2016-2018	Gerawat Gala	BN (PBB)
18th	N78	2018-2021	Gerawat Gala	GPS (PBB)
19th	N78	2021–2026	Gerawat Gala	GPS (PBB)

== Election results ==
Sarawak state election, 2026
Party	Candidate	Votes	%	∆%
PBK	Wilfred Entika			▲
GPS				▲
PH				▲
Total valid votes				
Total rejected ballots				
Unreturned ballots				
Turnout				
Registered electors				
Majority				

Sarawak state election, 2021
Party	Candidate	Votes	%	∆%
GPS	Gerawat Gala	3,731	66.67	▲66.67
PSB	Son Radu	856	15.30	▲15.30
PKR	Roland Engan	810	14.47	▼13.99
PBK	Richard Ibuh	199	3.56	▲3.56
Total valid votes		5,596	100.00	
Total rejected ballots		172		
Unreturned ballots		34		
Turnout		5,802	60.61	▼1.67
Registered electors		9,572		
Majority		2,875	51.37	▲18.75
GPS gain from BN		Swing		?
Source(s) https://lom.agc.gov.my/ilims/upload/portal/akta/outputp/1718688/PUB687.pdf

Sarawak state election, 2016
Party	Candidate	Votes	%
BN	Gerawat Gala	3,198	61.08
PKR	Pauls Baya	1,490	28.46
DAP	Paul Anyie Raja	309	5.90
Independent	Roland Dom Mattu	239	4.56
Total valid votes		5,236	100.00
Total rejected ballots		111	
Unreturned ballots		9	
Turnout		5,356	62.28
Registered electors		8,600	
Majority		1,708	32.62
Source(s) "Federal Government Gazette - Notice of Contested Election, State Legislative Assembly of the State of Sarawak [P.U. (B) 190/2016]" (PDF). Attorney General's Chambers of Malaysia. 25 April 2016. Archived from the original (PDF) on 12 June 2017. "Senarai Calon yang Disahkan Layak Bertanding Pilihan Raya Dewan Undangan Negeri ke-11". Election Commission of Malaysia. 25 April 2016. Archived from the original on 25 April 2016.
