= Sabah State Water Department corruption probe =

2015–2016 Malaysian investigation

The Sabah State Water Department corruption probe (Malay: Siasatan Rasuah Jabatan Air Negeri Sabah) refers to a 2015 to 2016 widespread investigation by the Malaysian Anti-Corruption Commission (MACC) over the alleged abuse of power inside the Sabah State Water Department resulting in the arrest of two senior officers in the state agency along with the confiscation of RM3 million which had been kept inside a safe deposit box in the office of one of the suspects, together with a total of RM52 million in cash, more were seized from various places, including from the officials' house, which also includes gold and stone jewellery, luxury brand watches, 94 branded handbags, nine luxury cars and folders containing 127 land grants of the two officers. Another businessman with the title of "Datuk" (one of the official's brothers) and his accountant were also arrested in connection with the case. During the confiscation of the RM52 million, the MACC members, a group of 30 people, took 15 hours to go through it, using the serial numbers to estimate some of the sealed stacks.

The total confiscation then increased to RM53.7 million, RM112 million and finally to RM114.5 million, with the case being considered the largest ever confiscation by MACC in the country's corruption history until being surpassed by Malaysia's 9th Prime Minister, Ismail Sabri's case with RM177 million confiscation in 2025. Until 12 October 2016, the four people remained arrested, with another five people being called to help facilitate the investigation following the record statements from 40 people, including department officers and contractors. Three of the witnesses surrender a total of RM1 million to MACC after giving their statements on the probe. Further investigation revealed another RM30 million in foreign banks with a money trail leading to Australia and New Zealand and another RM30 million in land titles. For over 5 years, both of the two main suspects had taken 60% of state funds channelled by the federal government that were supposedly used for water supply works.

== Background ==
Responding to complaints over the unfair distribution of water development project contracts in the department, the MACC spent over a year investigating the two suspects who appeared to be living upper-middle-class lives. According to the investigations by 70 MACC personnel since 2015, both suspects are linked to 38 different companies since 2010, with the department director linked to 17 companies owned by his siblings and proxies, while his deputy is connected to 21 companies owned by his family members. Almost every water development project in the state was awarded to both suspects' linked companies. The department was also seen as not auditing its infrastructure projects since 2002. A check by the local newspaper, New Straits Times, on the auditor general (AG) reports from 2002 until 2015 found that the department had only been audited seven times, with the records only focusing on its non-revenue water (NRW) management and privatisation of supply.

Based on the 2015 statistics from the National Water Services Commission (Malay: Suruhanjaya Perkhidmatan Air Negara (SPAN)), 87.9% of Sabah residents received a treated water supply compared to the state of Kelantan, with only 64%, as many Kelantan residents mostly depend on alternative water resources. The Sabah State Water Department are mostly poor in the handling of NRW due to theft, leakage, burst pipes, faulty meters and maintenance works, with Sabah's rate at 55.1%, the second bottom after Perlis with 56.3%.

=== Probe ===
Following a series of investigations for years, a team of MACC then raided the office of the Sabah State Water Department on 4 October 2016, arresting the department's director Awang Tahir Awang Talib (aged 54) and his assistant Teo Chee Kong (52) on the spot along with the confiscation of RM114 million worth of assets and RM53.7 million in "cold cash", with further investigation revealing a money trail leading to Singapore, Australia and New Zealand. The shocking revelation led the MACC deputy chief commissioner to say:

In the 49 years since the commission was set up, we have never seen this amount of money. The thought that this involves government servants is very bad.

— Malaysian Anti-Corruption Commission (MACC) deputy chief commissioner (operations) Azam Baki.

The two suspects' accounts have since been frozen. with the money confiscated are believed to have been syphoned from federal government allocations to the department for infrastructure projects worth RM3.3 billion since 2010. The MACC deputy chief commissioner said that they would be using the Association of Southeast Asian Nations (ASEAN) Legal Assistance Agreement (MLA) to get cooperation from neighbouring ASEAN countries to get the money back in a bank account linked to both suspects. On 13 October 2016, a former deputy director for the department, Lim Lam Beng (64) was arrested to assist in the ongoing investigation. The suspect has held the post for 11 years until 2015 before appointed as technical and engineering advisor in the Sabah Ministry of Finance. During his term, the suspect had received money from contractors. One of the two main suspects was, however, released on bail on 16 October after his 12-day remand order had expired, though neither of them can be working in the department anymore and were blacklisted from leaving the state of Sabah. Another two suspects that were arrested earlier were released the next day.

On 19 October, 19 district engineers were arrested in connection with the probe for allegedly taking 30% of contract values which were awarded to proxy contractors. A total of RM2.4 million was also seized from them along with procurement files from 27 locations around the state. Three other suspects who work as officers in the department were arrested on 20 October, while the position of the former director was replaced by a new officer on the same day.

Until 1 December, the MACC has spent nearly a month analysing 8,000 payment vouchers between 2008 and 2016 from "tens of thousands of documents" as part of their ongoing investigations. The MACC stated that it will complete the investigation soon, with investigation papers to be submitted to the Attorney-General. On 29 December, the two main suspects, together with one of the suspect's wives Fauziah Piut (51), were charged by MACC at the state Sessions Court.

== Trial ==
More than 200 witnesses are expected to give their statements for the trial that began in July 2017. On 13 December 2017, one of the four suspects, Teo Chee Kong, faced 146 counts of charges for misappropriation involving RM32 million.

Early in 2018, the trial was supposed to be resumed on 2–3 April but was postponed to 7–11 May. In March 2018, Teo's application to quash all 146 corruption charges made against him was dismissed by the court. On 15 May, the water department signed and pledged to the Corruption-Free Pledge of the MACC with participation from the Director of JANS, Heads of Division, District Engineers, as well as senior officers and staff. On 18 May 2018, the Court of Appeal had allowed Teo to be suspended from the trial pending the court's decision on the accused's application against Sessions Court Judge Abu Bakar Manat hearing the trial and a joint trial with three other accused. Deputy Public Prosecutor Tengku Amir Zaki Tengku Abdul Rahman on behalf of the MACC then requested that the sessions court postpone the hearing to facilitate a trial for all the accused. The trial is subsequently allowed to be adjourned until a proper decision by the Court of Appeal as well as the recusal order is reached, while a hearing will be held on 30 and 31 July as well as on 1 and 2 August, respectively, with all four suspects charged with a combined total of 183 counts of money laundering involving nearly RM100 million. Until November 2018, since the change of the state government, the new Infrastructure Development Minister Peter Anthony said he is still puzzled about the current status of the case, as there is no new information received from the MACC.

On 19 March 2019, the Sessions Court set tentative trial dates commencing 6 August for the continuation of the trial of the money laundering case involving the four suspects with five witnesses who had been called in the trial. All the suspects pleaded not guilty to 37 counts of money laundering involving RM61.57 million.

In March 2022, former Sabah water department deputy director Teo Chee Kong was acquitted of 146 charges brought against him. However, MACC decided to charge RM30 million compound against Teo. Teo later paid the compound amount in full to the Malaysian federal government.

== Reactions ==
The arrestment has been applauded by most of the public as well as the international anti-corruption organisation, Transparency International (TI). Though the corruption issue has also led to many conspiracy theories and finger-pointing, with attempts by politicians to link both suspects to political parties and their political opponents. The corruption among government officials has led the federal government to impose a new law on every development project that costs more than RM500 million to involve the country Auditor General (AG) and MACC. TI has urged MACC to investigate any politicians involved in the corruption, with MACC having promised earlier to conduct a further depth investigation, as the corruption could be including any politicians.

=== Government officials ===
Sabah Chief Minister Musa Aman ordered a review of the management of external funds channelled to all state ministries, departments and agencies following the arrest of its state government officials. Musa also urged the public to stop making speculation until the investigation is finished. Sabah Deputy Chief Minister Joseph Pairin Kitingan was shocked when he heard of the arrest and assured that his ministry would leave no stone unturned in investigating the two officers suspected of corruption and abuse of power. Minister in the Prime Minister's Department, Abdul Rahman Dahlan, expressed regret over the case but said, "A total revamp is not necessary, as not all government staff in the department were involved". Communications and Multimedia Minister Salleh Said Keruak supported the arrest and said, "Malaysians, especially Sabahans, fully supported MACC action to expose corruption and abuse of power in the department," while also urging the public to refrain from making any further speculation. Foreign Minister Anifah Aman denied allegations that the two officers arrested are linked to his ministry and the Kimanis United Malays National Organisation (UMNO) division. Malaysian Chinese Association (MCA) religious harmony bureau chairman Ti Lian Ker said the scandal shows that the government's check and balance system has failed and needs to be overhauled.

Neighbouring Sarawak State Secretary Mohd Morshidi Abdul Ghani has warned of "dire consequences" if civil servants in Sarawak fail to uphold their integrity pledges, citing the corruption case in Sabah prior to this. Chief Secretary to the Government, Ali Hamsa, called on the public to not regard all the 1.61 million civil servants in Malaysia as corrupt because of the malpractices of a few individuals shortly after the revelation in the case. Tenom UMNO Member of Parliament (MP) Raime Unggi said the case is "unlikely to be limited to state officials", as the corruption of such scale must logically involve collusion at the Rural and Regional Development Ministry, given that the case involved RM3.3 billion in projects handed out in 2010 during the time the ministry was headed by Shafie Apdal.

=== Opposition politicians ===
Penampang MP Darell Leiking has called on MACC to investigate every completed and ongoing project in Sabah for elements of corruption and hopes the commission will uncover many more abuses that have happened in the state for a long time. Darell also demands a probe on the Kaiduan Dam project, as officials in the water department had before ignored the complaints of villagers most affected by the projects, with the state government having vowed to go ahead with the project to solve the state water crisis despite claims by activists that the dam will displace and threaten the livelihoods of potentially more than 1,000 indigenous villagers when it submerges 12 square kilometres of forest and parts of the Crocker Range. While the founder of the Sabah division of the State Reform Party (STAR), Jeffrey Kitingan, says the seizure of millions of money justifies calls to channel all development funds for federal projects to the Sabah state government for implementation. The statement by Tenom MP (see above) was responded to by Likas assemblyman Junz Wong, suggesting the "MACC should also probe the local Finance Ministry (MOF) for the corruption case" rather than solely blaming the federal government as preferred by Raime before; he instead suggested the authorities should firstly investigate all state-level ministries to find more details on the corruption.

Former Rural and Regional Development Minister Shafie Apdal denied that he and his former ministry had any links with the corruption in the awarding of infrastructure projects worth RM3.3 billion during his term and said he is prepared to co-operate with the MACC. Sabah Democratic Action Party (DAP) Chairman Stephen Wong Tien Fatt demanded Joseph Pairin Kitingan resign over the corruption case, as the department was under his purview. Wong's statement was then responded to by the President of the Sabah Progressive Party (SAPP), Yong Teck Lee, citing "it is too early to determine the political responsibility" in the case. Sabah People's Justice Party (PKR) lawmaker and sole opposition member in the Public Audit Committee (PAC) Dr. Roland Chia has indicated that he intends to table the report on the "Auditing of Infrastructure Projects" undertaken by the State Water Department since 2010 at the committee's forthcoming meeting.

Ba'kelalan PKR Assemblyman and senior lawyer Baru Bian, commenting on a local news report from The Borneo Post that asked the opinion of Sarawak leaders if the issue would affect Sarawak, said, "One could say that nobody is surprised anymore about corruption scandals in our country", citing the MACC report following the investigation that "the wealth of the two officers involved was not commensurate with their salaries" is similar to the case of the wealth of the former Sarawak Chief Minister. While former PKR leader Anwar Ibrahim blamed the corruption issue on the "Sabahan nativist attitude", his statement is believed to refer to the recent decision by several Sabahan politicians to quit federal-based opposition parties of DAP and PKR to join new Sabah-based political platforms.

=== Public ===
The corruption issue was met with criticism by most Sabahan peoples, as many of the allocations by the federal government that were supposedly being used to improve the poor water services in the state were instead being taken by corrupt officials in the state government. Local non-governmental organisations (NGOs) such as Task Force Against Kaiduan Dam (TAKaD) spokesperson Mary Giun have said a Kaiduan Dam project by the state water department in Ulu Papar should be cancelled, as the project had always been shrouded in controversy. Jaringan Orang Asal SeMalaysia (JOAS) secretary Jannie Lasimbang said the disclosure has called into question all existing, implemented or proposed projects and contracts by the Sabah Water Department, and in particular the proposed Kaiduan Dam project. The corruption also becomes the reason why the Malaysian ringgit is getting weak due to persistent corrupt practices among the country's officials, with the public viewing the case as "just one of the many hidden corruption cases in the country".

== See also ==
- Corruption in Malaysia
- 1Malaysia Development Berhad scandal
