= Telang Usan =

State constituency in Sarawak, Malaysia

Telang Usan (N77)
Sarawak constituency

State constituency
- Legislature: Sarawak State Legislative Assembly
MLA
Vacant
- Constituency created: 1968
- First contested: 1969
- Last contested: 2026

Telang Usan is a state constituency in Sarawak, Malaysia, that has been represented in the Sarawak State Legislative Assembly since 1969.

The state constituency was created in the 1968 redistribution and is mandated to return a single member to the Sarawak State Legislative Assembly under the first past the post voting system.

== Demographics ==
Ethnic breakdown of Telang Usan's electorate as of 2022
1. Sarawak bumiputera (94.8%)
2. Chinese (3.20%)
3. Malay-Muslim bumiputera (0.50%)
4. Other ethnicities (1.50%)

== History ==
As of 2020, Telang Usan has a population of 15,942 people.

=== Polling districts ===
According to the gazette issued on 31 October 2022, the Telang Usan constituency has a total of 6 polling districts.

State constituency	Polling Districts	Code	Location
Telang Usan (N77)	Long Miri	220/77/01	SK Lg. Miri (Daleh Lg. Pelutan); SK Lg. Tepen Pelutan; SK Uma Bawang; SK Lg. Pilah
Telang Usan (N77)	Pana	220/77/02	RH TK Kalong Nun Lg. Buken; RH TK Bitang Sakai lg Law; SK Lg. Aton; SK Lg. Sobeng; SK Lg Loyang; RH Lg. Aya; Kpg. Lg. Tebanyi Tinjar
Telang Usan (N77)	Akapatah	220/77/03	SK L.g. Kesseh; SK Lg. Naah; RH TK Madang Wan; SK L.g. Luteng Patah; RH TK Ibau Wan Lg. Tebangan
Telang Usan (N77)	San	220/77/04	SK St. Pius Lg San; SK Lg. Palai; SK Lg. Anap; SK Lg. Apu; RH TK Mathew Belulok Lalo; RH Tk Long Tap
Telang Usan (N77)	Long Lama	220/77/05	RH Tk Jacob Lawai Nawan Sg Dua Baram; SK Lg. Laput; SMK Lg. Lama; RH Tk Anthony Ngau Kpg. Uma Akeh; SK Murek Lg. Banyok; SK Lg. Ikang
Telang Usan (N77)	Apoh	220/77/06	SK Lg. Kevok; SK Lg. Bedian; Tadika Kampung Long Beluk; SK Lg. Bemang; SK Lg. Atip; SK L.g. Wat; Dewan Serbaguna Kampung Long Latei; RH Tk Kampung Long Win; Balai Raya Kpg Ba' Kabeng

=== Representation history ===
Members of the Legislative Assembly for Telang Usan
Assembly	No	Years	Member	Party
Constituency created
8th	N46	1970-1974	Joseph Balan Seling	SNAP
9th	N46	1974-1979	Joseph Balan Seling	SNAP
10th	N46	1979-1983	Joseph Balan Seling	BN (SNAP)
11th	N46	1983-1987	Joseph Balan Seling	SNAP
12th	N46	1987-1991	Joseph Balan Seling	PBDS
13th	N54	1991-1996	Joseph Balan Seling	BN (PBDS)
14th	N59	1996-2001	Kebing Wan	Independent
15th	N59	2001-2006	Lihan Jok	BN (PBB)
16th	N67	2006-2011	Lihan Jok	BN (PBB)
17th	N67	2011-2016	Dennis Ngau	BN (PBB)
18th	N77	2016-2018	Dennis Ngau	BN (PBB)
18th	N77	2018-2021	Dennis Ngau	GPS (PBB)
19th	N77	2021–2026	Dennis Ngau	GPS (PBB)

== Election results ==
Sarawak state election, 2026: Telang Usan
Party	Candidate	Votes	%	∆%
GPS				▲
PH				▲
Total valid votes				
Total rejected ballots				
Unreturned ballots				
Turnout				
Registered electors				
Majority				

Sarawak state election, 2021: Telang Usan
Party	Candidate	Votes	%	∆%
GPS	Dennis Ngau	3,861	59.76	▲59.76
PSB	Jau Jok @ Jenggo	1,439	22.27	▲22.27
PKR	Philip Jau Ding	1,093	16.92	▲16.92
PBK	Gia Bala	68	1.05	▲1.05
Total valid votes		6,461	100.00	
Total rejected ballots		77		
Unreturned ballots		24		
Turnout		6,562	57.24	▼6.64
Registered electors		11,465		
Majority		2,422	37.49	▲34.84
GPS gain from BN		Swing		?
Source(s) https://lom.agc.gov.my/ilims/upload/portal/akta/outputp/1718688/PUB687.pdf

Sarawak state election, 2016: Telang Usan
Party	Candidate	Votes	%	∆%
BN	Dennis Ngau	3,231	51.33	▲4.48
PKR	Roland Engan	3,064	48.67	▲12.82
Total valid votes		6,295	100.00	
Total rejected ballots		82		
Unreturned ballots		11		
Turnout		6,388	63.88	▲6.73
Registered electors		10,000		
Majority		167	2.65	▼8.35
BN hold		Swing		
Source(s) "Federal Government Gazette - Notice of Contested Election, State Legislative Assembly of the State of Sarawak [P.U. (B) 190/2016]" (PDF). Attorney General's Chambers of Malaysia. 25 April 2016. Archived from the original (PDF) on 2017-06-12. "Senarai Calon yang Disahkan Layak Bertanding Pilihan Raya Dewan Undangan Negeri ke-11". Election Commission of Malaysia. 25 April 2016. Archived from the original on 25 April 2016.

Sarawak state election, 2011: Telang Usan
Party	Candidate	Votes	%	∆%
BN	Dennis Ngau	3,597	46.85	▼23.18
PKR	Harrison Ngau Laing	2,752	35.85	▲35.85
SNAP	Kebing Wan	705	9.18	▼18.60
Independent	Jok Ding	623	8.12	▲8.12
Total valid votes		7,677	100.00	
Total rejected ballots		86		
Unreturned ballots		22		
Turnout		7,785	57.15	▲5.21
Registered electors		13,623		
Majority		845	11.01	▼31.24
BN hold		Swing		
Source(s) "Federal Government Gazette - Results of Contested Election and Statements of the Poll after the Official Addition of Votes Sarawak [P.U. (B) 245/2011]" (PDF). Attorney General's Chambers of Malaysia. 29 April 2011.

Sarawak state election, 2006: Telang Usan
Party	Candidate	Votes	%	∆%
BN	Lihan Jok	4,593	70.03	▲11.75
SNAP	Kebing Wan	1,822	27.78	▲27.78
Independent	Lidam Janang	144	2.19	▲2.19
Total valid votes		6,559	100.00	
Total rejected ballots		76		
Unreturned ballots		10		
Turnout		6,645	51.94	▲1.68
Registered electors		12,793		
Majority		2,771	42.25	▲25.68
BN hold		Swing		

Sarawak state election, 2001: Telang Usan
Party	Candidate	Votes	%	∆%
BN	Lihan Jok	3,621	58.28	▲12.20
Independent	Kebing Wan	2,592	41.72	▼12.20
Total valid votes		6,213	100.00	
Total rejected ballots		106		
Unreturned ballots		9		
Turnout		6,328	50.26	▼3.21
Registered electors		12,591		
Majority		1,029	16.56	▲8.72
BN gain from Independent		Swing		?

Sarawak state election, 1996: Telang Usan
Party	Candidate	Votes	%	∆%
Independent	Kebing Wan	3,554	53.92	▲53.92
BN	Robert Laing Anyie	3,037	46.08	▼10.89
Total valid votes		6,591	100.00	
Total rejected ballots		149		
Unreturned ballots		12		
Turnout		6,752	53.47	▼3.86
Registered electors		12,628		
Majority		517	7.84	▼13.75
Independent gain from BN		Swing		?

Sarawak state election, 1991: Telang Usan
Party	Candidate	Votes	%	∆%
BN	Joseph Balan Seling	3,252	56.97	▲4.97
PBDS	Harrison Ngau Laing	2,019	35.37	▼16.78
Independent	Steward Ngau Ding	342	5.99	▲5.99
Independent	John Kalang Urang	95	1.66	▲1.66
Total valid votes		5,708	100.00	
Total rejected ballots		57		
Unreturned ballots		9		
Turnout		5,774	57.33	▼1.39
Registered electors		10,071		
Majority		1,233	21.60	▲17.36
BN gain from PBDS		Swing		?

Sarawak state election, 1987: Telang Usan
Party	Candidate	Votes	%	∆%
PBDS	Joseph Balan Seling	2,878	52.12	▲52.12
BN	Kebing Wan	2,644	47.88	▲47.88
Total valid votes		5,522	100.00	
Total rejected ballots		79		
Unreturned ballots		0		
Turnout		5,601	59.28	▲6.31
Registered electors		9,449		
Majority		234	4.24	▼6.41
PBDS gain from SNAP		Swing		?

Sarawak state election, 1983: Telang Usan
Party	Candidate	Votes	%	∆%
SNAP	Joseph Balan Seling	3,019	55.3	▲55.32
Independent	Kebing Wan	2,438	44.68	▲44.68
Total valid votes		5,457	100.00	
Total rejected ballots		81		
Unreturned ballots		0		
Turnout		5,538	65.59	▲1.27
Registered electors		8,444		
Majority		581	10.65	▼43.99
SNAP gain from BN		Swing		?

Sarawak state election, 1979: Telang Usan
Party	Candidate	Votes	%	∆%
BN	Joseph Balan Seling	3,667	74.96	▲30.38
SAPO	Paul Kalang	994	20.32	▲20.32
Independent	Kho Tieng Seng	231	4.72	
Total valid votes		4,892	100.00	
Total rejected ballots		98		
Unreturned ballots		0		
Turnout		4,990	64.32	▼5.18
Registered electors		7,758		
Majority		2,673	54.64	▲43.80
BN gain from SNAP		Swing		?

Sarawak state election, 1974: Telang Usan
Party	Candidate	Votes	%	∆%
SNAP	Joseph Balan Seling	2,315	55.42	▲7.19
BN	Stephen Timothy Wan Uilok	1,862	44.58	▲44.58
Total valid votes		4,177	100.00	
Total rejected ballots		486		
Unreturned ballots		0		
Turnout		4,663	69.50	▲1.37
Registered electors		6,709		
Majority		453	10.84	▼13.02
SNAP hold		Swing		

Sarawak state election, 1969: Telang Usan
Party	Candidate	Votes	%
SNAP	Joseph Balan Seling	1,718	48.23
Independent	Lee Kee Bian	868	24.37
PESAKA	Dennis Hawan Lawai	750	21.06
Independent	Balan Lejau	226	6.34
Total valid votes		3,562	100.00
Total rejected ballots		363	
Unreturned ballots		0	
Turnout		3,925	68.13
Registered electors		5,761	
Majority		850	23.86
This was a new constituency created.
