= Anyi Ngau =

Malaysian politician

Yang Berhormat Dato Anyi Ngau PSBS MP

Secretary General of the Progressive Democratic Party
- Incumbent
- Assumed office 10 June 2023
- President: Tiong King Sing
- Preceded by: Nelson Balang Rining

Member of the Malaysian Parliament for Baram
- Incumbent
- Assumed office 5 May 2013
- Preceded by: Jacob Dungau Sagan (BN–PDP)
- Majority: 194 (2013); 1,990 (2018); 7,339 (2022)

Faction represented in Dewan Rakyat
- 2013–2018: Barisan Nasional
- 2018: Progressive Democratic Party
- 2018–: Gabungan Parti Sarawak

Personal details
- Born: Anyi Ngau; 1959 (age 66–67) Crown Colony of Sarawak (now Sarawak, Malaysia)
- Citizenship: Malaysian
- Party: Progressive Democratic Party (PDP)
- Other political affiliations: Barisan Nasional (BN) (–2018); Gabungan Parti Sarawak (GPS) (since 2018)
- Relatives: Roland Engan (nephew)
- Education: Universiti Sains Malaysia
- Occupation: Politician

Dato Anyi Ngau (born 1959) is a Malaysian politician who has served as the Member of Parliament (MP) for Baram since May 2013. He is a member of the Progressive Democratic Party (PDP), a component party of the Gabungan Parti Sarawak (GPS) and formerly Barisan Nasional (BN) coalitions. He has also served as the Secretary General of PDP since June 2023. He is one of the only two PDP MPs alongside Minister of Tourism, Arts and Culture and Bintulu MP Tiong King Sing.

== Political career ==
=== Member of Parliament (since 2013) ===
==== 2013 general election ====
In the 2013 general election, Anyi made his electoral debut after being nominated by BN to contest for the Baram federal seat. He won the seat and was elected to Parliament as the Baram MP for the first time, narrowly defeating his nephew, Roland Engan of Pakatan Rakyat (PR), and another independent candidate by a majority of only 194 votes.

==== 2018 general election ====
In the 2018 general election, despite rumours that a direct member of BN would be nominated instead of Anyi to defend the Baram seat, he was renominated by BN to do so. He defended it and was reelected as the Baram MP for a second term after defeating Roland of Pakatan Harapan (PH) again by a majority of 1,990 votes.

==== 2020 political appointments ====
On 9 March 2020, Prime Minister Muhyiddin Yassin offered PDP MP for Bintulu Tiong King Sing the appointment of the Deputy Minister of National Unity. However, Tiong declined it. There was a speculation that Muhyiddin would offer Anyi the appointment, as Anyi was another PDP MP, but this has never happened. Muhyiddin instead offered the appointment to Senator and Malaysian Chinese Association (MCA) Vice-President Ti Lian Ker, and was accepted by Ti. Instead, he was appointed Chairman of the Malaysia Cocoa Board on 20 May 2020, replacing Deputy Minister of Home Affairs II and MP for Ranau, Jonathan Yasin. He was additionally appointed Chairman of the Malaysian Pepper Board on 1 July 2020.

==== 2022 general election ====
In the 2022 general election, Anyi was nominated by GPS to defend the seat again. He defended the seat and was reelected as the Baram MP for the third term after defeating Roland of PH again and another independent candidate by a majority of 7,339 votes.

=== Background and education ===
Anyi is of Kenyah descent and graduated from Universiti Sains Malaysia (USM).

== Election results ==
Parliament of Malaysia
Year	Constituency	Candidate	Votes	Pct	Opponent(s)	Votes	Pct	Ballots cast	Majority	Turnout
2013	P220 Baram	Anyi Ngau (SPDP)	9,182	49.54%	Roland Engan (PKR)	8,988	48.50%	18,796	194	63.96%
2013	P220 Baram	Anyi Ngau (SPDP)	9,182	49.54%	Patrick Sibat (IND)	363	1.96%	18,796	194	63.96%
2018	P220 Baram	Anyi Ngau (PDP)	12,171	54.45%	Roland Engan (PKR)	10,181	45.55%	22,806	1,990	63.91%
2022	P220 Baram	Anyi Ngau (PDP)	18,399	61.78%	Roland Engan (PKR)	11,060	37.14%	30,218	7,339	50.76%
2022	P220 Baram	Anyi Ngau (PDP)	18,399	61.78%	Wilfred Entika (IND)	324	1.09%	30,218	7,339	50.76%

== Honours ==
=== Honours of Malaysia ===
- Malaysia
  - Recipient of the 17th Yang di-Pertuan Agong Installation Medal
- Sarawak
  - Commander of the Most Exalted Order of the Star of Sarawak (PSBS) – Dato (2022)
