= List of Malaysian State Assembly Representatives (2013–2018) =

Subnational legislature representatives

List of Malaysian State Assembly Representatives (2008–2013)
List of Malaysian State Assembly Representatives (2013–2018)
List of Malaysian State Assembly Representatives (2018–2023)

The following are the members of the Dewan Undangan Negeri or state assemblies, elected in the 2013 state election and by-elections. Also included is the list of the Sarawak state assembly members who were elected in 2016.

The opposition coalition Pakatan Rakyat that contested the general elections in 2013 was dissolved after series of disagreements between two main parties, Democratic Action Party (DAP) and Pan-Malaysian Islamic Party (PAS). A new opposition coalition Pakatan Harapan was formed by the Democratic Action Party, People's Justice Party (PKR) and newly formed party National Trust Party (PAN), consisting of ex-PAS members. Several ex-UMNO members, including Mahathir Mohamad, formed their own party, the Malaysian United Indigenous Party (BERSATU), and signed an electoral pact with Pakatan Harapan to contest future general elections and ensure straight fights against Barisan Nasional. On 20 March 2017 BERSATU officially became a member of Pakatan Harapan.

== Composition ==
Equal-area representation of state constituencies as elected in 2013

Beginning of the State Legislative Assembly May / June 2013
State legislative assemblies	# of seats	Simple majority	BN seats	DAP seats	PAS seats	PKR seats	STAR seats
Perlis	15	8	13	0	1	1	0
Kedah	36	19	21	2	9	4	0
Kelantan	45	23	12	0	32	1	0
Terengganu	32	17	17	0	14	1	0
Penang	40	21	10	19	1	10	0
Perak	59	30	31	18	5	5	0
Pahang	42	22	30	7	2	3	0
Selangor	56	29	12	15	15	14	0
Negeri Sembilan	36	19	22	11	0	3	0
Malacca	28	15	21	6	1	0	0
Johor	56	29	38	13	4	1	0
Sabah	60	31	48	4	0	7	1
Total	505		275	95	85	49	1

Beginning of the State Legislative Assembly May / June 2013
State legislative assemblies	# of seats	Simple majority	BN seats	PR / STAR seats (informal)
Perlis	15	8	13	2
Kedah	36	19	21	15
Kelantan	45	23	12	33
Terengganu	32	17	17	15
Penang	40	21	10	30
Perak	59	30	31	28
Pahang	42	22	30	12
Selangor	56	29	12	44
Negeri Sembilan	36	19	22	14
Malacca	28	15	21	7
Johor	56	29	38	18
Sabah	60	31	48	12
Total	505		275	230

Dissolution of the State Legislative Assembly March / April 2018
State legislative assemblies	# of seats	Simple majority	BN seats	PAS seats	DAP seats	PKR seats	PAN seats	UPP seats	WARISAN seats	PPBM seats	PCS seats	PHRS seats	STAR seats	IND seats	VAC seats
Perlis	15	8	13	1	0	1	0	0	0	0	0	0	0	0	0
Kedah	36	19	20	7	2	4	1	0	0	2	0	0	0	0	0
Kelantan	45	23	11	31	0	1	1	0	0	0	0	0	0	0	1
Terengganu	32	17	17	14	0	1	0	0	0	0	0	0	0	0	0
Penang	40	21	10	1	19	10	0	0	0	0	0	0	0	0	0
Perak	59	30	31	4	18	5	1	0	0	0	0	0	0	0	0
Pahang	42	22	29	2	7	2	1	0	0	0	0	0	0	0	1
Selangor	56	29	11	12	14	14	2	0	0	0	0	0	0	2	1
Negeri Sembilan	36	19	21	0	11	3	0	0	0	0	0	0	0	0	1
Malacca	28	15	21	1	3	0	0	0	0	0	0	0	0	3	0
Johor	56	29	37	3	13	1	1	0	0	1	0	0	0	0	0
Sabah	60	31	45	0	1	2	0	0	3	0	1	1	1	3	3
Sarawak	82	42	67	0	7	3	0	5	0	0	0	0	0	0	0
Total	587		333	76	95	47	7	5	3	3	1	1	1	8	7

Dissolution of the State Legislative Assembly March / April 2018
State legislative assemblies	# of seats	Simple majority	BN seats	PAS seats	PH seats (informal)	Others seats
Perlis	15	8	13	1	1	0
Kedah	36	19	20	7	9	0
Kelantan	45	23	11	31	2	1 List: Vacant seat (1)
Terengganu	32	17	17	14	1	0
Penang	40	21	10	1	29	0
Perak	59	30	31	4	24	0
Pahang	42	22	29	2	10	1 List: Vacant seat (1)
Selangor	56	29	11	12	30	3 List: Independent (2); List: Vacant seat (1)
Negeri Sembilan	36	19	21	0	14	1 List: Vacant seat (1)
Malacca	28	15	21	1	3	3 List: Independent (3)
Johor	56	29	37	3	16	0
Sabah	60	31	45	0	3	12 List: Sabah Heritage Party (3); List: Love Sabah Party (1); List: Sabah People's Hope Party (1); List: State Reform Party (1); List: Independent (3); List: Vacant seats (3)
Sarawak	82	42	67	0	10	5 List: United People's Party (5)
Total	587		333	76	152	26

== Perlis ==
No.	State Constituency	Member	Party
BN 13 | PAS 1 | PKR 1
N01	Titi Tinggi	Khaw Hock Kong	BN (MCA)
N02	Beseri	Md Rawi Kassim	BN (UMNO)
N03	Chuping	Asmaiza Ahmad	BN (UMNO)
N04	Mata Ayer	Khairi Hasan	BN (UMNO)
N05	Santan	Sabry Ahmad	BN (UMNO)
N06	Bintong	Rela Ahmad	BN (UMNO)
N07	Sena	Abdul Jamil Saad	BN (UMNO)
N08	Indera Kayangan	Chan Ming Kai	PH (PKR)
N09	Kuala Perlis	Mat Hassan	BN (UMNO)
N10	Kayang	Ahmad Bakri Ali	BN (UMNO)
N11	Pauh	Azlan Man	BN (UMNO)
N12	Tambun Tulang	Ismail Kassim	BN (UMNO)
N13	Guar Sanji	Jafperi Othman	BN (UMNO)
N14	Simpang Empat	Nurulhisham Yaakob	BN (UMNO)
N15	Sanglang	Mohd. Shukri Ramli	PAS

== Kedah ==
13th Kedah State Legislative Assembly
←	12th Assembly	14th Assembly	→

Overview
- Legislative body: Kedah State Legislative Assembly
- Jurisdiction: Kedah
- Meeting place: Wisma Darul Aman, Alor Setar
- Term: 23 June 2013 – 29 March 2018
- Election: 2013 state election
- Government: Kedah State Executive Council
- Website: mmk.kedah.gov.my
- Members: 36
- Speaker: Md Rozai Shafian
- Deputy Speaker: Azmi Che Husain
- Menteri Besar: Mukhriz Mahathir (until 4 February 2016); Ahmad Bashah Md Hanipah
- Opposition Leader: Azizan Abdul Razak (until 23 June 2013); Amiruddin Hamzah
- Party control: Barisan Nasional

Sovereign
- Sultan: Sultan Abdul Halim Mu’adzam Shah (until 11 September 2017); Sultan Sallehuddin

=== Elected members ===
No.	State Constituency	Member	Party
BN 20 | PAS 7 | PKR 4 | DAP 2 | BERSATU 2 | AMANAH 1
N01	Ayer Hangat	Mohd Rawi Abdul Hamid (EXCO Member)	BN (UMNO)
N02	Kuah	Nor Saidi Nanyan	BN (UMNO)
N03	Kota Siputeh	Abu Hasan Sarif	BN (UMNO)
N04	Ayer Hitam	Mukhriz Mahathir (Note: Mukhriz Mahathir was elected as a BN state assemblyman in the general elections in 2013, was sacked from his UMNO membership on 24 June 2016 and later joined newly formed PPBM.)	PH (BERSATU)
N05	Bukit Kayu Hitam	Ahmad Zaini Japar	BN (UMNO)
N06	Jitra	Aminuddin Omar (EXCO Member)	BN (UMNO)
N07	Kuala Nerang	Badrol Hisham Hashim (EXCO Member)	BN (UMNO)
N08	Pedu	Kama Noriah Ibrahim	BN (UMNO)
N09	Bukit Lada	Ahmad Lebai Sudin	BN (UMNO)
N10	Bukit Pinang	Wan Romani Wan Salim	PAS
N11	Derga	Tan Kok Yew	PH (DAP)
N12	Bakar Bata	Ahmad Bashah Md Hanipah (Menteri Besar)	BN (UMNO)
N13	Kota Darul Aman	Teoh Boon Kok @ Teoh Kai Kok	PH (DAP)
N14	Alor Mengkudu	Ahmad Saad @ Yahaya	PAS
N15	Anak Bukit	Amiruddin Hamzah (Note: Amiruddin Hamzah was elected as a PAS assemblyman in a general elections, quit his PAS membership and joined PPBM.) (Opposition Leader)	PH (BERSATU)
N16	Kubang Rotan	Mohd Nasir Mustafa	PAS
N17	Pengkalan Kundor	Phahrolrazi Zawawi (Note: Phahrolrazi Zawawi was elected as a PAS assemblyman in a general elections, quit his PAS membership and joined PAN.)	PH (AMANAH)
N18	Tokai	Mohamed Taulan Rasul	PAS
N19	Sungai Tiang	Suraya Yaacob (EXCO Member)	BN (UMNO)
N20	Sungai Limau	Mohd Azam Abd Samat from 4 November 2013 (Note: Mohd Azam Samat was elected as a Pakatan Rakyat assemblyman on 4 November 2013 in a by-election following the death of assemblyman Azizan Abdul Razak, former Kedah Menteri Besar)	PAS
N20	Sungai Limau	Azizan Abdul Razak until 26 September 2013	PAS
N21	Guar Chempedak	Ku Abd Rahman Ku Ismail (EXCO Member)	BN (UMNO)
N22	Gurun	Leong Yong Kong (EXCO Member)	BN (MCA)
N23	Belantek	Mohd Tajudin Abdullah (EXCO Member)	BN (UMNO)
N24	Jeneri	Mahadzir Abdul Hamid	BN (UMNO)
N25	Bukit Selambau	Krishnamoorthy Rajannaidu	PH (PKR)
N26	Tanjong Dawai	Tajul Urus Mat Zain (EXCO Member)	BN (UMNO)
N27	Pantai Merdeka	Ali Yahaya	BN (UMNO)
N28	Bakar Arang	Simon Ooi Tze Min	PH (PKR)
N29	Sidam	Robert Ling Kui Ee	PH (PKR)
N30	Bayu	Azmi Che Husain (Deputy Speaker)	BN (UMNO)
N31	Kupang	Harun Abdul Aziz	BN (UMNO)
N32	Kuala Ketil	Md Zuki Yusof	PAS
N33	Merbau Pulas	Siti Aishah Ghazali	PAS
N34	Lunas	Azman Nasruddin	PH (PKR)
N35	Kulim	Chua Thiong Gee	BN (MCA)
N36	Bandar Baharu	Norsabrina Mohd. Noor (EXCO Member)	BN (UMNO)

=== Seating arrangement ===
Vacant	Vacant	Vacant	Vacant		Vacant	N31 Kupang	N27 Pantai Merdeka	N24 Jeneri
Vacant	Vacant	Vacant	Vacant		N09 Bukit Lada	N35 Kulim	N02 Kuah	N08 Pedu
	N11 Derga	N20 Sungai Limau	N28 Bakar Arang		N36 Bandar Baharu (EXCO Member)	N06 Jitra (EXCO Member)	N05 Bukit Kayu Hitam
		N14 Alor Mengkudu	C		B	N23 Belantek (EXCO Member)
	N13 Kota Darul Aman	N10 Bukit Pinang	D	Sergeant-at-Arm	A	N01 Ayer Hangat (EXCO Member)	N30 Bayu (Deputy Speaker)
	N25 Bukit Selambau	N32 Kuala Ketil	D		A	N07 Kuala Nerang (EXCO Member)	N03 Kota Siputeh
	N34 Lunas	N16 Kubang Rotan	D	the Mace	A	N26 Tanjong Dawai (EXCO Member)	N22 Gurun (EXCO Member)
	N24 Sidam	N33 Merbau Pulas	D	the Mace	A	N19 Sungai Tiang (EXCO Member)	State Financial Officer
	N04 Ayer Hitam	N18 Tokai	D		A	N21 Guar Chempedak (EXCO Member)	State Legal Advisor
	N17 Pengkalan Kundor	N15 Anak Bukit (Opposition Leader)	D	Secretary	A	N12 Bakar Bata (Menteri Besar)	State Secretary
				Speaker
				Sultan

== Kelantan ==
No.	State Constituency	Member	Party
PAS 31 | BN 11 | PKR 1 | AMANAH 1 | VAC 1
N01	Pengkalan Kubor	Mat Razi Mat Ail from 25 September 2014 (Note: Mat Razi Mat Ail was elected as a Barisan Nasional assemblyman on 25 September 2014 in a by-election following the death of assemblyman Noor Zahidi Omar.)	BN (UMNO)
N01	Pengkalan Kubor	Noor Zahidi Omar until 20 August 2014	BN (UMNO)
N02	Kelaboran	Mohamad Zaki Ibrahim	PAS
N03	Pasir Pekan	Ahmad Yakob	PAS
N04	Wakaf Bharu	Che Abdullah Mat Nawi	PAS
N05	Kijang	Wan Ubaidah Omar	PAS
N06	Chempaka	Ahmad Fathan Mahmood from 22 March 2015 (Note: Ahmad Fathan Mahmood was elected as a Pakatan Rakyat assemblyman on 22 March 2015 in a by-election following the death of assemblyman Nik Abdul Aziz Nik Mat, former Kelantan Menteri Besar.)	PAS
N06	Chempaka	Nik Abdul Aziz Nik Mat until 12 February 2015	PAS
N07	Panchor	Nik Mohd. Amar Nik Abdullah	PAS
N08	Tanjong Mas	Rohani Ibrahim	PAS
N09	Kota Lama	Anuar Tan Abdullah	PAS
N10	Bunut Payong	Ramli Mamat	PAS
N11	Tendong	Rozi Muhamad	PAS
N12	Pengkalan Pasir	Hanifa Ahmad	PAS
N13	Chetok	Abdul Halim Abdul Rahman	PAS
N14	Meranti	Mohd. Nassuruddin Daud	PAS
N15	Gual Periok	Mohamad Awang	PAS
N16	Bukit Tuku	Abdul Rasul Mohamed	PAS
N17	Salor	Husam Musa (Note: Husam Musa was elected as a PAS assemblyman in the general election and was sacked from the party on 23 April 2016 and became an independent. He later joined PAN on 30 August 2016.)	PH (AMANAH)
N18	Pasir Tumboh	Abd Rahman Yunus	PAS
N19	Demit	Mumtaz Md. Nawi	PAS
N20	Tawang	Hassan Mohamood	PAS
N21	Perupok	Mohd Huzaimy Che Husin	PAS
N22	Jelawat	Abdul Azziz Kadir	PAS
N23	Melor	Md Yusnan Yusof	PAS
N24	Kadok	Azami Md. Nor	PAS
N25	Kok Lanas	Md Alwi Che Ahmad	BN (UMNO)
N26	Bukit Panau	Abdul Fattah Mahmood	PAS
N27	Gual Ipoh	Bakri @ Mohd Bakri Mustapha	BN (UMNO)
N28	Kemahang	Md. Anizam Ab. Rahman	PAS
N29	Selising	Zulkifle Ali	BN (UMNO)
N30	Limbongan	Mohd Nazlan Mohamed Hasbullah	PAS
N31	Semerak	Zawawi Othman	BN (UMNO)
N32	Gaal	Tuan Mazlan Tuan Mat	PAS
N33	Pulai Chondong	Zulkifli Mamat	PAS
N34	Temangan	Mohamed Fadzli Hassan	PAS
N35	Kemuning	Mohd Roseli Ismail	PAS
N36	Bukit Bunga	Mohd Adhan Kechik	BN (UMNO)
N37	Air Lanas	Mustapa Mohamed	BN (UMNO)
N38	Kuala Balah	Abd Aziz Derashid	BN (UMNO)
N39	Mengkebang	Ab Latiff Ab Rahman	PAS
N40	Guchil	Mohd Roslan Puteh	PH (PKR)
N41	Manek Urai	Mohd Fauzi Abdullah	PAS
N42	Dabong	Ramzi Ab Rahman	BN (UMNO)
N43	Nenggiri	Vacant since 11 July 2017 (Note: Mat Yusoff Abd Ghani was elected as a Barisan Nasional MP in the general elections in 2013, was voted out by the Kelantan assembly on 11 July 2017 and his seat declared vacant.)	VAC
N43	Nenggiri	Mat Yusoff Abd Ghani until 11 July 2017	BN (UMNO)
N44	Paloh	Nozula Mat Diah	BN (UMNO)
N45	Galas	Ab Aziz Yusoff	BN (UMNO)

== Terengganu ==
No.	State Constituency	Member	Party
BN 17 | PAS 14 | PKR 1
N01	Kuala Besut	Tengku Zaihan Che Ku Abd Rahman from 24 July 2013 (Note: Tengku Zaihan Che Ku Abd Rahman was elected as a Barisan Nasional assemblyman on 24 July 2013 in a by-election following the death of assemblyman A. Rahman Mokhtar.)	BN (UMNO)
N01	Kuala Besut	A. Rahman Mokhtar until 26 June 2013	BN (UMNO)
N02	Kota Putera	Mohd Mahdi Musa	BN (UMNO)
N03	Jertih	Muhammad Pehimi Yusof	BN (UMNO)
N04	Hulu Besut	Nawi Mohamad	BN (UMNO)
N05	Jabi	Mohd Iskandar Jaafar	BN (UMNO)
N06	Permaisuri	Mohd Jidin Shafee	BN (UMNO)
N07	Langkap	Sabri Mohd Noor	BN (UMNO)
N08	Batu Rakit	Bazlan Abd Rahman	BN (UMNO)
N09	Tepuh	Hishamuddin Abdul Karim	PAS
N10	Teluk Pasu	Ridzuan Hashim	PAS
N11	Seberang Takir	Ahmad Razif Abd Rahman	BN (UMNO)
N12	Bukit Tunggal	Alias Razak	PAS
N13	Wakaf Mempelam	Mohd Abdul Wahid Endut	PAS
N14	Bandar	Azan Ismail	PH (PKR)
N15	Ladang	Tengku Hassan Tengku Omar	PAS
N16	Batu Buruk	Syed Azman Syed Ahmad Nawawi	PAS
N17	Alur Limbat	Ariffin Deraman	PAS
N18	Bukit Payung	Mohd Nor Hamzah	PAS
N19	Ru Rendang	Abdul Hadi Awang	PAS
N20	Pengkalan Berangan	A. Latiff Awang	BN (UMNO)
N21	Telemung	Rozi Mamat	BN (UMNO)
N22	Manir	Hilmi Harun	PAS
N23	Kuala Berang	T. Putera T. Awang	BN (UMNO)
N24	Ajil	Ghazali Taib	BN (UMNO)
N25	Bukit Besi	Roslee Daud	BN (UMNO)
N26	Rantau Abang	Alias Harun	PAS
N27	Sura	Wan Hapandi Wan Nik	PAS
N28	Paka	Satiful Bahri Mamat	PAS
N29	Kemasik	Rosli Othman	BN (UMNO)
N30	Kijal	Ahmad Said	BN (UMNO)
N31	Cukai	Hanafiah Mat	PAS
N32	Air Putih	Wan Abdul Hakim Wan Mokhtar	BN (UMNO)

== Penang ==
No.	State Constituency	Member	Party
DAP 19 | PKR 10 | BN 10 | PAS 1
N01	Penaga	Mohd Zain Ahmad	BN (UMNO)
N02	Bertam	Shariful Azhar Othman	BN (UMNO)
N03	Pinang Tunggal	Roslan Saidin	BN (UMNO)
N04	Permatang Berangan	Omar Abd Hamid	BN (UMNO)
N05	Sungai Dua	Muhamad Yusoff Mohd Noor	BN (UMNO)
N06	Telok Ayer Tawar	Jahara Hamid	BN (UMNO)
N07	Sungai Puyu	Phee Boon Poh	PH (DAP)
N08	Bagan Jermal	Lim Hock Seng	PH (DAP)
N09	Bagan Dalam	Tanasekharan Autherapady	PH (DAP)
N10	Seberang Jaya	Afif Bahardin	PH (PKR)
N11	Permatang Pasir	Mohd Salleh Man	PAS
N12	Penanti	Norlela Ariffin	PH (PKR)
N13	Berapit	Ong Kok Fooi	PH (DAP)
N14	Machang Bubok	Lee Khai Loon	PH (PKR)
N15	Padang Lalang	Chong Eng	PH (DAP)
N16	Perai	Ramasamy Palanisamy	PH (DAP)
N17	Bukit Tengah	Ong Chin Wen	PH (PKR)
N18	Bukit Tambun	Law Choo Kiang	PH (PKR)
N19	Jawi	Soon Lip Chee	PH (DAP)
N20	Sungai Bakap	Maktar Shapee	PH (PKR)
N21	Sungai Acheh	Mahmud Zakaria	BN (UMNO)
N22	Tanjong Bunga	Teh Yee Cheu	PH (DAP)
N23	Air Puteh	Lim Guan Eng	PH (DAP)
N24	Kebun Bunga	Cheah Kah Peng	PH (PKR)
N25	Pulau Tikus	Yap Soo Huey	PH (DAP)
N26	Padang Kota	Chow Kon Yeow	PH (DAP)
N27	Pengkalan Kota	Lau Keng Ee	PH (DAP)
N28	Komtar	Teh Lai Heng	PH (DAP)
N29	Datok Keramat	Jagdeep Singh Deo	PH (DAP)
N30	Sungai Pinang	Lim Siew Khim	PH (DAP)
N31	Batu Lancang	Law Heng Kiang	PH (DAP)
N32	Seri Delima	RSN Rayer	PH (DAP)
N33	Air Itam	Wong Hon Wai	PH (DAP)
N34	Paya Terubong	Yeoh Soon Hin	PH (DAP)
N35	Batu Uban	Jayabalan A. Thambyappa	PH (PKR)
N36	Pantai Jerejak	Mohd Rashid Hasnon	PH (PKR)
N37	Batu Maung	Abdul Malik Abdul Kassim	PH (PKR)
N38	Bayan Lepas	Nordin Ahmad	BN (UMNO)
N39	Pulau Betong	Muhammad Farid Saad	BN (UMNO)
N40	Telok Bahang	Shah Haedan Ayoob Hussain Shah	BN (UMNO)

== Perak ==
No.	State Constituency	Member	Party
BN 31 | DAP 18 | PAS 4 | PKR 5 | AMANAH 1
N01	Pengkalan Hulu	Aznel Ibrahim	BN (UMNO)
N02	Temengor	Salbiah Mohamed	BN (UMNO)
N03	Kenering	Mohd Tarmizi Idris	BN (UMNO)
N04	Kota Tampan	Saarani Mohamad	BN (UMNO)
N05	Selama	Mohamad Daud Mohd Yusoff	BN (UMNO)
N06	Kubu Gajah	Ahmad Hasbullah Alias	BN (UMNO)
N07	Batu Kurau	Muhammad Amin Zakaria	BN (UMNO)
N08	Titi Serong	Abu Bakar Hussian	PAS
N09	Kuala Kurau	Abdul Yunus Jamhari	PH (PKR)
N10	Alor Pongsu	Sham Mat Sahat	BN (UMNO)
N11	Gunong Semanggol	Mohd Zawawi Abu Hassan	PAS
N12	Selinsing	Husin Din	PAS
N13	Kuala Sapetang	Chua Yee Ling	PH (PKR)
N14	Changkat Jering	Mohammad Nizar Jamaluddin (Note: Mohammad Nizar Jamaluddin was elected as a PAS assemblyman in a general elections, quit his PAS membership and joined PAN.)	PH (AMANAH)
N15	Trong	Zabri Abd Wahid	BN (UMNO)
N16	Kamunting	Mohamad Zahir Abdul Khalid	BN (UMNO)
N17	Pokok Assam	Teh Kok Lim	PH (DAP)
N18	Aulong	Leow Thye Yih	PH (DAP)
N19	Chenderoh	Zainun Mat Noor	BN (UMNO)
N20	Lubok Merbau	Siti Salmah Mat Jusak	BN (UMNO)
N21	Lintang	Mohd Zolkafly Harun	BN (UMNO)
N22	Jalong	Loh Sze Yee	PH (DAP)
N23	Manjoi	Mohamad Ziad Mohamed Zainal Abidin	BN (UMNO)
N24	Hulu Kinta	Aminuddin Md Hanafiah	BN (UMNO)
N25	Canning	Wong Kah Woh	PH (DAP)
N26	Tebing Tinggi	Ong Boon Piow	PH (DAP)
N27	Pasir Pinji	Howard Lee Chuan How	PH (DAP)
N28	Bercham	Cheong Chee Khing	PH (DAP)
N29	Kepayang	Nga Kor Ming	PH (DAP)
N30	Buntong	Sivasubramaniam Athinarayanan	PH (DAP)
N31	Jelapang	Teh Hock Ke	PH (DAP)
N32	Menglembu	Lim Pek Har	PH (DAP)
N33	Tronoh	Paul Yong Choo Kiong	PH (DAP)
N34	Bukit Chandan	Maslin Sham Razman	BN (UMNO)
N35	Manong	Mohamad Kamil Shafie	BN (UMNO)
N36	Pengkalan Baharu	Abdul Manaf Hashim	BN (UMNO)
N37	Pantai Remis	Wong May Ing	PH (DAP)
N38	Belanja	Mohd Nizar Zakaria	BN (UMNO)
N39	Bota	Nasarudin Hashim	BN (UMNO)
N40	Malim Nawar	Leong Cheok Keng	PH (DAP)
N41	Keranji	Chen Fook Chye	PH (DAP)
N42	Tualang Sekah	Nolee Ashilin Mohamed Radzi	BN (UMNO)
N43	Sungai Rapat	Radzi Zainon	PAS
N44	Simpang Pulai	Tan Kar Hing	PH (PKR)
N45	Teja	Chang Lih Kang	PH (PKR)
N46	Chenderiang	Mah Hang Soon	BN (MCA)
N47	Ayer Kuning	Samsudin Abu Hassan	BN (UMNO)
N48	Sungai Manik	Zainol Fadzi Paharudin	BN (UMNO)
N49	Kampong Gajah	Abdullah Fauzi Ahmad Razali	BN (UMNO)
N50	Sitiawan	Ngeh Koo Ham	PH (DAP)
N51	Pasir Panjang	Rashidi Ibrahim	BN (UMNO)
N52	Pangkor	Zambry Abd Kadir	BN (UMNO)
N53	Rungkup	Shahrul Zaman Yahya	BN (UMNO)
N54	Hutan Melintang	Kesavan Subramaniam	PH (PKR)
N55	Pasir Bedamar	Terence Naidu Raja Naidu @ Rajanaidu	PH (DAP)
N56	Changkat Jong	Mohd Azhar Jamaluddin	BN (UMNO)
N57	Sungkai	Sivanesan Achalingam	PH (DAP)
N58	Slim	Mohd Khusairi Abdul Talib	BN (UMNO)
N59	Behrang	Rusnah Kassim	BN (UMNO)

== Pahang ==
No.	State Constituency	Member	Party
BN 29 | PAS 2 | DAP 7 | PKR 2 | AMANAH 1 | VAC 1
N01	Tanah Rata	Leong Ngah Ngah	PH (DAP)
N02	Jelai	Wan Rosdy Wan Ismail	BN (UMNO)
N03	Padang Tengku	Mustapa Long	BN (UMNO)
N04	Cheka	Fong Koong Fuee	BN (MCA)
N05	Benta	Mohd. Soffi Abd. Razak	BN (UMNO)
N06	Batu Talam	Abd. Aziz Mat Kiram	BN (UMNO)
N07	Tras	Choong Siew Onn	PH (DAP)
N08	Dong	Shahiruddin Ab Moin	BN (UMNO)
N09	Tahan	Wan Amizan Wan Abdul Razak	BN (UMNO)
N10	Damak	Lau Lee	BN (MCA)
N11	Pulau Tawar	Ahmad Shukri Ismail	BN (UMNO)
N12	Beserah	Andansura Rabu	PAS
N13	Semambu	Lee Chean Chung	PH (PKR)
N14	Teruntum	Sim Chon Siang	PH (PKR)
N15	Tanjung Lumpur	Rosli Abdul Jabar	PAS
N16	Inderapura	Shafik Fauzan Sharif	BN (UMNO)
N17	Sungai Lembing	Md Sohaimi Mohamed Shah	BN (UMNO)
N18	Lepar	Vacant since 31 December 2017 (Note: Mohd Shohaimi Jusoh was elected as a Barisan Nasional assemblyman in the general elections in 2013, passed away on 31 December 2017, but his death did not necessitate a by-election.)	VAC
N18	Lepar	Mohd Shohaimi Jusoh until 31 December 2017	BN (UMNO)
N19	Panching	Mohd Zaili Besar	BN (UMNO)
N20	Pulau Manis	Khairuddin Mahmud	BN (UMNO)
N21	Peramu Jaya	Sh Mohamed Puzi Sh Ali	BN (UMNO)
N22	Bebar	Mohd. Fakhruddin Mohd. Arif	BN (UMNO)
N23	Chini	Abu Bakar Harun	BN (UMNO)
N24	Luit	Nurhidayah Mohamad Shahaimi	BN (UMNO)
N25	Kuala Sentul	Shahaniza Shamsuddin	BN (UMNO)
N26	Chenor	Mohamed Arifin Awang Ismail	BN (UMNO)
N27	Jenderak	Mohamed Jaafar	BN (UMNO)
N28	Kerdau	Syed Ibrahim Syed Ahmad	BN (UMNO)
N29	Jengka	Wan Salman Wan Ismail	BN (UMNO)
N30	Mentakab	Tengku Zulpuri Shah Raja Puji	PH (DAP)
N31	Lanchang	Mohd Sharkar Shamsudin	BN (UMNO)
N32	Kuala Semantan	Syed Hamid Syed Mohamed (Note: Syed Hamid Syed Mohamed was elected as a PAS assemblyman in a general elections, quit his PAS membership and joined PAN.)	PH (AMANAH)
N33	Bilut	Chow Yu Hui	PH (DAP)
N34	Ketari	Lee Chin Chen	PH (DAP)
N35	Sabai	Kamache Doray Rajoo	PH (DAP)
N36	Pelangai	Adnan Yaakob	BN (UMNO)
N37	Guai	Norol Azali Sulaiman	BN (UMNO)
N38	Triang	Leong Yu Man	PH (DAP)
N39	Kemayan	Mohd Fadil Osman	BN (UMNO)
N40	Bukit Ibam	Wan Kadri Wan Mahusain	BN (UMNO)
N41	Muadzam Shah	Maznah Mazlan	BN (UMNO)
N42	Tioman	Mohd. Johari Husin	BN (UMNO)

== Selangor ==
No.	State Constituency	Member	Party
PKR 14 | DAP 14 | AMANAH 2 | PAS 12 | UMNO 11 | IND 2 | VAC 1
N01	Sungai Air Tawar	Vacant from 18 January 2017 (Note: Kamarol Zaki Abdul Malik was elected as a Barisan Nasional assemblyman in the general elections in 2013, died from cancer on 17 January 2017, but his death did not necessitate a by-election.)	VAC
N01	Sungai Air Tawar	Kamarol Zaki Abdul Malik until 17 January 2017	BN (UMNO)
N02	Sabak	Sallehen Mukhyi	PAS
N03	Sungai Panjang	Budiman Mohd Zohdi	BN (UMNO)
N04	Sekinchan	Ng Suee Lim	PH (DAP)
N05	Hulu Bernam	Rosni Sohar	BN (UMNO)
N06	Kuala Kubu Baharu	Lee Kee Hiong	PH (DAP)
N07	Batang Kali	Mat Nadzari Ahmad Dahalan	BN (UMNO)
N08	Sungai Burong	Mohd Shamsudin Lias	BN (UMNO)
N09	Permatang	Sulaiman Abdul Razak	BN (UMNO)
N10	Bukit Melawati	Jakiran Jacomah	BN (UMNO)
N11	Ijok	Idris Ahmad	PH (PKR)
N12	Jeram	Amiruddin Setro	BN (UMNO)
N13	Kuang	Abdul Shukur Idrus	BN (UMNO)
N14	Rawang	Gan Pei Nei	PH (PKR)
N15	Taman Templer	Zaidy Abdul Talib	PAS
N16	Batu Caves	Amirudin Shari	PH (PKR)
N17	Gombak Setia	Hasbullah Mohd Ridzwan	PAS
N18	Hulu Kelang	Saari Sungib (Note: Saari Sungib was elected as a PAS assemblyman in the general elections in 2013, quit and joined PAN.)	PH (AMANAH)
N19	Bukit Antarabangsa	Mohamed Azmin Ali	PH (PKR)
N20	Lembah Jaya	Khasim Abdul Aziz	PAS
N21	Chempaka	Iskandar Abdul Samad	PAS
N22	Teratai	Tiew Way Keng	PH (DAP)
N23	Dusun Tua	Razaly Hassan	PAS
N24	Semenyih	Johan Abd Aziz	BN (UMNO)
N25	Kajang	Wan Azizah Wan Ismail (Note: Wan Azizah Wan Ismail was elected as a Pakatan Rakyat assemblyman on 23 March 2014 in a by-election following the resignation of assemblyman Lee Chin Cheh.)	PH (PKR)
N26	Bangi	Mohd Shafie Ngah	PAS
N27	Balakong	Eddie Ng Tien Chee	PH (DAP)
N28	Seri Kembangan	Ean Yong Hian Wah	PH (DAP)
N29	Seri Serdang	Noor Hanim Ismail	PAS
N30	Kinrara	Ng Sze Han	PH (DAP)
N31	Subang Jaya	Hannah Yeoh Tseow Suan	PH (DAP)
N32	Seri Setia	Nik Nazmi Nik Ahmad	PH (PKR)
N33	Taman Medan	Haniza Mohamed Talha	PH (PKR)
N34	Bukit Gasing	Rajiv Rishyakaran	PH (DAP)
N35	Kampung Tunku	Lau Weng San	PH (DAP)
N36	Damansara Utama	Yeo Bee Yin	PH (DAP)
N37	Bukit Lanjan	Elizabeth Wong Keat Ping	PH (PKR)
N38	Paya Jaras	Mohd Khairuddin Othman (Note: Mohd Khairuddin Othman was elected as a PAS assemblyman in the general elections in 2013, quit the party on 31 December 2017 and joined PKR a day later.)	PH (PKR)
N39	Kota Damansara	Halimaton Saadiah Bohan	BN (UMNO)
N40	Kota Anggerik	Yaakob Sapari	PH (PKR)
N41	Batu Tiga	Rodziah Ismail	PH (PKR)
N42	Meru	Abd Rani Osman	PAS
N43	Sementa	Daroyah Alwi	PH (PKR)
N44	Sungai Pinang	Teng Chang Khim	PH (DAP)
N45	Selat Klang	Halimah Ali	PAS
N46	Pelabuhan Klang	Abdul Khalid Ibrahim (Note: Abdul Khalid Ibrahim was elected as a PR assemblyman in the general elections in 2013, sacked from his PKR membership on 9 August 2014.)	IND
N47	Pandamaran	Eric Tan Pok Shyong	PH (DAP)
N48	Kota Alam Shah	Ganabatirau Veraman	PH (DAP)
N49	Seri Andalas	Xavier Jayakumar Arulanandam	PH (PKR)
N50	Sri Muda	Mat Shuhaimi Shafiei	PH (PKR)
N51	Sijangkang	Ahmad Yunus Hairi	PAS
N52	Teluk Datuk	Loh Chee Heng (Note: Loh Chee Heng was elected as a PR assemblymen in the general elections in 2013, and was sacked from his DAP membership on 14 May 2016.)	IND
N53	Morib	Hasnul Baharuddin (Note: Hasnul Baharuddin was elected as a PAS MP in the general elections in 2013, quit and joined PAN.)	PH (AMANAH)
N54	Tanjong Sepat	Mohd Haslin Hassan	PAS
N55	Dengkil	Shahrum Mohd Sharif	BN (UMNO)
N56	Sungai Pelek	Lai Nyuk Lan	PH (DAP)

== Negeri Sembilan ==
No.	State Constituency	Member	Party
BN 21 | DAP 11 | PKR 3 | VAC 1
N01	Chennah	Anthony Loke Siew Fook	PH (DAP)
N02	Pertang	Jalaluddin Alias	BN (UMNO)
N03	Sungai Lui	Mohd Razi Mohd Ali	BN (UMNO)
N04	Klawang	Yunus Rahmat	BN (UMNO)
N05	Serting	Shamshulkahar Mohd. Deli	BN (UMNO)
N06	Palong	Lilah Yasin	BN (UMNO)
N07	Jeram Padang	Manickam Letchuman	BN (MIC)
N08	Bahau	Chew Seh Yong	PH (DAP)
N09	Lenggeng	Vacant since 19 July 2017 (Note: Ishak Ismail was elected as a Barisan Nasional assemblyman in the general elections in 2013, died from cancer on 19 July 2017, but his death did not necessitate a by-election.)	VAC
N09	Lenggeng	Ishak Ismail until 19 July 2017	BN (UMNO)
N10	Nilai	Arul Kumar Jambunathan	PH (DAP)
N11	Lobak	Siow Kim Leong	PH (DAP)
N12	Temiang	Ng Chin Tsai	PH (DAP)
N13	Sikamat	Aminuddin Harun	PH (PKR)
N14	Ampangan	Abu Ubaidah Redza	BN (UMNO)
N15	Juasseh	Mohammad Razi Kail	BN (UMNO)
N16	Seri Menanti	Abdul Samad Ibrahim	BN (UMNO)
N17	Senaling	Ismail Lasim	BN (UMNO)
N18	Pilah	Norhayati Omar	BN (UMNO)
N19	Johol	Abu Samah Mahat	BN (UMNO)
N20	Labu	Hasim Rusdi	BN (UMNO)
N21	Bukit Kepayang	Cha Kee Chin	PH (DAP)
N22	Rahang	Mary Josephine Pritam Singh	PH (DAP)
N23	Mambau	Yap Yew Weng	PH (DAP)
N24	Senawang	Gunasekaren Palasamy	PH (DAP)
N25	Paroi	Mohd Ghazali Wahid	BN (UMNO)
N26	Chembong	Zaifulbahri Idris	BN (UMNO)
N27	Rantau	Mohamad Hasan	BN (UMNO)
N28	Kota	Awaludin Said	BN (UMNO)
N29	Chuah	Chai Tong Chai	PH (PKR)
N30	Lukut	Ean Yong Tin Sin	PH (DAP)
N31	Bagan Pinang	Tun Hairuddin Abu Bakar	BN (UMNO)
N32	Linggi	Abdul Rahman Mohd Redza	BN (UMNO)
N33	Port Dickson	Ravi Munusamy	PH (PKR)
N34	Gemas	Abdul Razak Said	BN (UMNO)
N35	Gemencheh	Mohd Isam Mohd Isa	BN (UMNO)
N36	Repah	Veerapan Superamaniam	PH (DAP)

== Malacca ==
No.	State Constituency	Member	Party
BN 21 | PAS 1 | DAP 3 | IND 3
N01	Kuala Linggi	Ismail Othman	BN (UMNO)
N02	Tanjung Bidara	Md Rawi Mahmud	BN (UMNO)
N03	Ayer Limau	Amiruddin Yusop	BN (UMNO)
N04	Lendu	Sulaiman Md Ali	BN (UMNO)
N05	Taboh Naning	Latipah Omar	BN (UMNO)
N06	Rembia	Norpipah Abdol	BN (UMNO)
N07	Gadek	Mahadevan M. Sanacy	BN (MIC)
N08	Machap	Lai Meng Chong	BN (MCA)
N09	Durian Tunggal	Ab Wahab Ab Latip	BN (UMNO)
N10	Asahan	Abdul Ghafar Atan	BN (UMNO)
N11	Sungai Udang	Idris Haron	BN (UMNO)
N12	Pantai Kundor	Ab Rahaman Ab Karim	BN (UMNO)
N13	Paya Rumput	Sazali Muhd Din	BN (UMNO)
N14	Kelebang	Lim Ban Hong	BN (MCA)
N15	Bachang	Lim Jak Wong (Note: Lim Jak Wong was elected as a PR assemblyman in the general elections in 2013, was quit his DAP membership on 12 February 2017 and became an independent.)	IND
N16	Ayer Keroh	Khoo Poay Tiong	PH (DAP)
N17	Bukit Baru	Md Khalid Kassim	PAS
N18	Ayer Molek	Md Yunos Husin	BN (UMNO)
N19	Kesidang	Chin Choong Seong (Note: Chin Choong Seong was elected as a PR assemblyman in the general elections in 2013, was quit his DAP membership on 12 February 2017 and became an independent.)	IND
N20	Kota Laksamana	Lai Keun Ban	PH (DAP)
N21	Duyong	Goh Leong San (Note: Goh Leong San was elected as a PR assemblyman in the general elections in 2013, was suspended from his DAP membership on 9 February 2016 and became an independent.)	IND
N22	Bandar Hilir	Tey Kok Kiew	PH (DAP)
N23	Telok Mas	Latiff Tamby Chik	BN (UMNO)
N24	Bemban	Ng Choon Koon	BN (MCA)
N25	Rim	Ghazale Muhamad	BN (UMNO)
N26	Serkam	Zaidi Attan	BN (UMNO)
N27	Merlimau	Roslan Ahmad	BN (UMNO)
N28	Sungai Rambai	Hasan Abd Rahman	BN (UMNO)

== Johor ==
No.	State Constituency	Member	Party
BN 37 | PAS 3 | DAP 13 | BERSATU 1 | PKR 1 | AMANAH 1
N01	Buloh Kasap	Norshida Ibrahim	BN (UMNO)
N02	Jementah	Tan Chen Choon	PH (DAP)
N03	Pemanis	Lau Chin Hoon	BN (Gerakan)
N04	Kemelah	Ayub Rahmat	BN (UMNO)
N05	Tenang	Mohd Azahar Ibrahim	BN (UMNO)
N06	Bekok	Lim Eng Guan	PH (DAP)
N07	Bukit Serampang	Ismail Mohamed	BN (UMNO)
N08	Jorak	Shahruddin Md Salleh (Note: Shahruddin Md Salleh was elected as a BN state assemblyman in the general elections in 2013, resigned his UMNO membership on 6 October 2016 and later joined newly formed PPBM.)	PH (BERSATU)
N09	Gambir	Asojan Muniyandy	BN (MIC)
N10	Tangkak	Ee Chin Li	PH (DAP)
N11	Serom	Abd Razak Minhat	BN (UMNO)
N12	Bentayan	Chua Wee Beng	PH (DAP)
N13	Sungai Abong	Sheikh Ibrahim Salleh	PAS
N14	Bukit Naning	Saipolbahari Suib	BN (UMNO)
N15	Maharani	Mohammad Taslim	PAS
N16	Sungai Balang	Zaiton Ismail	BN (UMNO)
N17	Semerah	Mohd Ismail Roslan	BN (UMNO)
N18	Sri Medan	Zulkurnain Kamisan	BN (UMNO)
N19	Yong Peng	Chew Peck Choo	PH (DAP)
N20	Semarang	Samsolbari Jamali	BN (UMNO)
N21	Parit Yaani	Aminolhuda Hassan (Note: Aminolhuda Hassan was elected as a PAS assemblyman in the general elections in 2013, quit his membership and joined PAN.)	PH (AMANAH)
N22	Parit Raja	Azizah Zakaria	BN (UMNO)
N23	Penggaram	Gan Peck Cheng	PH (DAP)
N24	Senggarang	A. Aziz Ismail	BN (UMNO)
N25	Rengit	Ayub Jamil	BN (UMNO)
N26	Machap	Abdul Taib Abu Bakar	BN (UMNO)
N27	Layang-Layang	Abd Mutalip Abd Rahim	BN (UMNO)
N28	Mengkibol	Tan Hong Pin	PH (DAP)
N29	Mahkota	Md Jais Sarday	BN (UMNO)
N30	Paloh	Teoh Yap Kun	BN (MCA)
N31	Kahang	Vidyananthan Ramanadhan	BN (MIC)
N32	Endau	Abd Latiff Bandi	BN (UMNO)
N33	Tenggaroh	Raven Kumar Krishnasamy	BN (MIC)
N34	Panti	Baderi Dasuki	BN (UMNO)
N35	Pasir Raja	Adham Baba	BN (UMNO)
N36	Sedili	Rasman Ithnain	BN (UMNO)
N37	Johor Lama	Asiah Md Ariff	BN (UMNO)
N38	Penawar	Hamimah Mansor	BN (UMNO)
N39	Tanjong Surat	Syed Sis Syed Abdul Rahman	BN (UMNO)
N40	Tiram	Maulizan Bujang	BN (UMNO)
N41	Puteri Wangsa	Abdullah Husin	PAS
N42	Johor Jaya	Liow Cai Tung	PH (DAP)
N43	Permas	Mohamed Khaled Nordin	BN (UMNO)
N44	Tanjong Puteri	Adam Sumiru	BN (UMNO)
N45	Stulang	Andrew Chen Kah Eng	PH (DAP)
N46	Pengkalan Rinting	Cheo Yee How	PH (DAP)
N47	Kempas	Tengku Putra Haron Aminurrashid Tengku Hamid Jumat	BN (UMNO)
N48	Skudai	Boo Cheng Hau	PH (DAP)
N49	Nusa Jaya	Zaini Abu Bakar	BN (UMNO)
N50	Bukit Permai	Ali Mazat Salleh	BN (UMNO)
N51	Bukit Batu	Jimmy Puah Wee Tse	PH (PKR)
N52	Senai	Wong Shu Qi	PH (DAP)
N53	Benut	Hasni Mohammad	BN (UMNO)
N54	Pulai Sebatang	Tee Siew Kiong	BN (MCA)
N55	Pekan Nenas	Yeo Tung Siong	PH (DAP)
N56	Kukup	Suhaimi Salleh	BN (UMNO)

== Sabah ==
No.	State Constituency	Member	Party
BN 45 | WARISAN 3 | PKR 2 | DAP 1 | PCS 1 | PHRS 1 | STAR 1 | IND 3 | VAC 3
N01	Banggi	Abdul Mijul Unaini	BN (UMNO)
N02	Tanjong Kapor	Teo Chee Kang	BN (LDP)
N03	Pitas	Bolkiah Ismail	BN (UMNO)
N04	Matunggong	Jelani Dasanap (Note: Jelani Dasanap was elected as a Pakatan Rakyat assemblyman in the general elections in 2013 resigned from PKR and became an independent.)	IND
N05	Tandek	Lasiah Baranting @ Anita	BN (PBS)
N06	Tempasuk	Musbah Jamli	BN (UMNO)
N07	Kadamaian	Jeremmy Ukoh Malajad (Note: Jeremmy Ukoh Malajad was elected as a Pakatan Rakyat assemblyman in the general elections in 2013 resigned from PKR and became an independent.)	IND
N08	Usukan	Mohd. Salleh Mohd. Said	BN (UMNO)
N09	Tamparuli	Wilfred Bumburing (Note: Wilfred Mojilip Bumburing was elected as a Pakatan Rakyat assemblyman in the general elections in 2013 on a PKR ticket and later left to join PCS.)	PCS
N10	Sulaman	Hajiji Noor	BN (UMNO)
N11	Kiulu	Joniston Bangkuai	BN (PBS)
N12	Karambunai	Jainab Ahmad Ayid	BN (UMNO)
N13	Inanam	Roland Chia Ming Shen	PH (PKR)
N14	Likas	Junz Wong Hong Jun (Note: Wong Hong Jun was elected as a Pakatan Rakyat assemblyman in the general elections in 2013 resigned from DAP and became an independent, after which he joined a new Sabah based party, Sabah Heritage Party.)	WARISAN
N15	Api-Api	Christina Liew Chin Jin	PH (PKR)
N16	Luyang	Hiew King Cheu (Note: Hiew King Cheu was elected as a Pakatan Rakyat assemblyman in the general elections in 2013 resigned from DAP, becoming and independent and then joined Barisan Nasional.)	BN (MCA)
N17	Tanjong Aru	Yong Oui Fah	BN (PBS)
N18	Petagas	Yahyah Hussin	BN (UMNO)
N19	Kapayan	Edwin Bosi (Note: Edwin Bosi was elected as a Pakatan Rakyat assemblyman in the general elections in 2013 resigned from DAP and became an independent.)	IND
N20	Moyog	Terrence Siambun (Note: Terrence Siambun was elected as a Pakatan Rakyat assemblyman in the general elections in 2013 resigned from PKR and became an independent, after which he joined a new Sabah based party, Sabah Heritage Party.)	WARISAN
N21	Kawang	Ghulam Haidar Khan Bahadar	BN (UMNO)
N22	Pantai Manis	Abdul Rahim Ismail	BN (UMNO)
N23	Bongawan	Mohamad Alamin	BN (UMNO)
N24	Membakut	Mohd. Arifin Mohd. Arif	BN (UMNO)
N25	Klias	Lajim Ukin (Note: Lajim Ukin was elected as a Pakatan Rakyat assemblyman in the general elections in 2013 resigned from PKR, became an independent then founded a new party Sabah People's Hope Party.)	PHRS
N26	Kuala Penyu	Limus Jury	BN (UPKO)
N27	Lumadan	Kamarlin Ombi	BN (UMNO)
N28	Sindumin	Ahmad Bujang	BN (UMNO)
N29	Kundasang	Joachim Gunsalam	BN (PBS)
N30	Karanaan	Masidi Manjun	BN (UMNO)
N31	Paginatan	Vacant since 20 March 2018 (Note: Siringan Gubat was elected as a Barisan Nasional assemblyman in the general elections in 2013, died from a heart attack on 20 March 2018, but his death did not necessitate a by-election.)	VAC
N31	Paginatan	Siringan Gubat until 20 March 2018	BN (UPKO)
N32	Tambunan	Joseph Pairin Kitingan	BN (PBS)
N33	Bingkor	Geoffrey Gapari Kitingan	STAR
N34	Liawan	Sairin Karno	BN (UMNO)
N35	Melalap	Radin Malleh	BN (PBS)
N36	Kemabong	Rubin Balang	BN (UMNO)
N37	Sook	Ellron Alfred Angin	BN (PBRS)
N38	Nabawan	Bobbey Ah Fang Suan	BN (UPKO)
N39	Sugut	James Ratib	BN (UMNO)
N40	Labuk	Metah Asang	BN (PBS)
N41	Gum-Gum	Zakaria Mohd Edris @ Tubau	BN (UMNO)
N42	Sungai Sibuga	Musa Aman	BN (UMNO)
N43	Sekong	Samsudin Yahya	BN (UMNO)
N44	Karamunting	Charles O Pang Su Pin	BN (LDP)
N45	Elopura	Au Kam Wah	BN (Gerakan)
N46	Tanjong Papat	Raymond Tan Shu Kiah	BN (Gerakan)
N47	Kuamut	Masiung Banah	BN (UPKO)
N48	Sukau	Saddi Abdul Rahman	BN (UMNO)
N49	Tungku	Vacant (Note: Mohd Suhaili Said was elected as a Barisan Nasional assemblyman in the general elections in 2013, died from cancer on 24 March 2017, but his death did not necessitate a by-election.)	VAC
N50	Lahad Datu	Mohammad Yusoff Apdal	BN (UMNO)
N51	Kunak	Nilwan Kabang	BN (UMNO)
N52	Sulabayan	Jaujan Sambakong (Note: Jaujan Sambakong was elected as a Barisan Nasional assemblyman in the general elections in 2013 resigned from United Malays National Organisation and became an independent, after which he joined a new Sabah based party, Sabah Heritage Party.)	WARISAN
N53	Senallang	Nasir Sakaran	BN (UMNO)
N54	Bugaya	Ramlee Marahaban	BN (UMNO)
N55	Balung	Syed Abas Syed Ali	BN (UMNO)
N56	Apas	Vacant (Note: Tawfiq Abu Bakar Titingan was elected as a Barisan Nasional assemblyman in the general elections in 2013, died from cancer on 14 March 2018, but his death did not necessitate a by-election.)	VAC
N57	Sri Tanjong	Chan Foong Hin	PH (DAP)
N58	Merotai	Pang Yuk Ming	BN (LDP)
N59	Tanjong Batu	Hamisa Samat	BN (UMNO)
N60	Sebatik	Abdul Muis Picho	BN (UMNO)

== Sarawak ==
=== 2016–2021 ===
Following the state election that was held on 7 May 2016, Barisan Nasional was able to form the next state government with a majority of 72 seats out of 82. There were several candidates from breakaway parties such as TERAS and UPP that had their members contest seats under the Barisan banner as direct election candidates under a deal by Adenan Satem after their parties were prevented from joining Barisan after opposition from parties such as PDP and SUPP. On 12 June 2018, all Sarawak-based BN parties including Parti Pesaka Bumiputera Bersatu (PBB), Parti Rakyat Sarawak (PRS), Progressive Democratic Party (PDP) and Sarawak United People's Party (SUPP) officially left Barisan Nasional forming a new coalition Sarawak Parties Alliance due to Barisan Nasional's defeat in general elections on 9 May 2018.

No.	State Constituency	Member	Party
GPS 67 | PSB 6 | PH 5 | PN 1 | IND 1 | VAC 2
N1	Opar	Ranum Mina (Note: Ranum Anak Mina contested the state election as a direct Barisan Nasional candidate, rejoin his previous party PSB on 11 August 2016.)	PSB
N2	Tasik Biru	Henry Jinep	GPS (PDP)
N3	Tanjong Datu	Jamilah Anu (Note: Jamilah Anu was elected as a Barisan Nasional assemblyman on 18 February 2017 in a byelection following the death of assemblymen and Chief Minister Adenan Satem.)	GPS (PBB)
N4	Pantai Damai	Abdul Rahman Junaidi (Assistant Minister)	GPS (PBB)
N5	Demak Laut	Hazland Abang Hipni	GPS (PBB)
N6	Tupong	Fazzrudin Abdul Rahman	GPS (PBB)
N7	Samariang	Sharifah Hasidah Sayeed Aman Ghazali (Assistant Minister)	GPS (PBB)
N8	Satok	Abang Abdul Rahman Zohari Abang Openg(Chief Minister)	GPS (PBB)
N9	Padungan	Wong King Wei (Note: Wong King Wei contested the general election as a Pakatan Harapan DAP candidate, resigned from the party on July 27, 2020 and became and independent.)	IND
N10	Pending	Violet Yong Wui Wui	PH (DAP)
N11	Batu Lintang	See Chee How (Note: See Chee How contested the general election as a Pakatan Harapan (PKR) candidate, was sacked of his party membership on 14 April 2020, becoming an independent and later joining Sarawak United Party on 29 May 2020.)	PSB
N12	Kota Sentosa	Chong Chieng Jen	PH (DAP)
N13	Batu Kitang	Lo Khere Chiang	GPS (SUPP)
N14	Batu Kawah	Sim Kui Hian(Minister)	GPS (SUPP)
N15	Asajaya	Abdul Karim Rahman Hamzah(Minister)	GPS (PBB)
N16	Muara Tuang	Idris Buang	GPS (PBB)
N17	Stakan	Mohamad Ali Mahmud	GPS (PBB)
N18	Serembu	Miro Simuh (Note: Miro Simuh contested the state election as a direct Barisan Nasional candidate, joining PBB on 16 August 2016.)	GPS (PBB)
N19	Mambong	Jerip Susil (Note: Jerip Susil contested the state election as a direct Barisan Nasional candidate, rejoin his previous party PSB on 13 August 2016. However, he officially left PSB on 11 July 2019, and became an independent assemblyman pledging his full support to the state Chief Minister, while retaining his position in the state cabinet as an Assistant Minister. Over quarter years later, he unanimously joins PBB on 24 October 2019.)(Assistant Minister)	GPS (PBB)
N20	Tarat	Roland Sagah Wee Inn (Assistant Minister)	GPS (PBB)
N21	Tebedu	Michael Manyin Jawong(Minister)	GPS (PBB)
N22	Kedup	Martin Ben	GPS (PBB)
N23	Bukit Semuja	John Ilus (Note: John Ilus contested the state election as a direct Barisan Nasional candidate, joining PBB on 16 August 2016.)	GPS (PBB)
N24	Sadong Jaya	Aidel Lariwoo	GPS (PBB)
N25	Simunjan	Awla Idris	GPS (PBB)
N26	Gedong	Mohd. Naroden Majais (Assistant Minister)	GPS (PBB)
N27	Sebuyau	Julaihi Narawi (Assistant Minister)	GPS (PBB)
N28	Lingga	Simoi Peri	GPS (PBB)
N29	Beting Maro	Razaili Gapor	GPS (PBB)
N30	Balai Ringin	Snowdan Lawan(Assistant Minister)	GPS (PRS)
N31	Bukit Begunan	Mong Dagang	GPS (PRS)
N32	Simanggang	Francis Harden Hollis (Assistant Minister)	GPS (SUPP)
N33	Engkilili	Johnical Rayong Ngipa (Note: Johnical Rayong Ngipa contested the state election as a direct Barisan Nasional candidate, rejoin his previous party PSB on 12 August 2016.)	PSB
N34	Batang Ai	Malcom Mussen Lamoh(Assistant Minister)	GPS (PRS)
N35	Saribas	Mohammad Razi Sitam	GPS (PBB)
N36	Layar	Gerald Rentap Jabu	GPS (PBB)
N37	Bukit Saban	Douglas Uggah Embas(Deputy Chief Minister)	GPS (PBB)
N38	Kalaka	Abdul Wahab Aziz	GPS (PBB)
N39	Krian	Ali Biju (Note: Ali Biju contested the general election as a Pakatan Harapan (PKR) candidate, quit his party membership on 24 February 2020. He later officially joined BERSATU on 11 March 2020)	PN (BERSATU)
N40	Kabong	Mohamad Chee Kadir	GPS (PBB)
N41	Kuala Rajang	Len Talif Salleh (Assistant Minister)	GPS (PBB)
N42	Semop	Abdullah Saidol (Assistant Minister)	GPS (PBB)
N43	Daro	Safiee Ahmad	GPS (PBB)
N44	Jemoreng	Juanda Jaya	GPS (PBB)
N45	Repok	Huang Tiong Sii	GPS (SUPP)
N46	Meradong	Ding Kuong Hiing	GPS (SUPP)
N47	Pakan	William Mawan Ikom (Note: William Mawan Ikom contested the state election as a direct Barisan Nasional candidate, revealing on March 19, 2018 that he had joined PBB.)	GPS (PBB)
N48	Meluan	Rolland Duat Jubin	GPS (PDP)
N49	Ngemah	Alexander Vincent	GPS (PRS)
N50	Machan	Allan Siden Gramong	GPS (PBB)
N51	Bukit Assek	Irene Mary Chang Oi Ling	PH (DAP)
N52	Dudong	Tiong Thai King (Note: Tiong Thai King contested the state election as a direct Barisan Nasional candidate, rejoin his previous party PSB after the election.)	PSB
N53	Bawang Assan	Wong Soon Koh (Note: Wong Soon Koh contested the state election as a direct Barisan Nasional candidate, rejoin his previous party PSB after the election.) (Opposition Leader)	PSB
N54	Pelawan	David Wong Kee Woan	PH (DAP)
N55	Nangka	Annuar Rapaee(Assistant Minister)	GPS (PBB)
N56	Dalat	Fatimah Abdullah @ Ting Sai Ming(Minister)	GPS (PBB)
N57	Tellian	Yussibnosh Balo	GPS (PBB)
N58	Balingian	Abdul Yakub Arbi	GPS (PBB)
N59	Tamin	Christopher Gira Sambang	GPS (PRS)
N60	Kakus	John Sikie Tayai (Assistant Minister)	GPS (PRS)
N61	Pelagus	Wilson Nyabong Ijang	GPS (PRS)
N62	Katibas	Ambrose Blikau Enturan	GPS (PBB)
N63	Bukit Goram	Jefferson Jamit Unyat	GPS (PBB)
N64	Baleh	Vacant (Note: Its previous holder, James Jemut Masing from GPS (PRS), died in office on 31 October 2021. As he died close to Sarawak state election for 19th Assembly, a by-election was not expected to be held to fill the vacancy.)	
N65	Belaga	Liwan Lagang(Assistant Minister)	GPS (PRS)
N66	Murum	Chukpai Ugon	GPS (PRS)
N67	Jepak	Talib Zulpilip (Minister)	GPS (PBB)
N68	Tanjong Batu	Chiew Chiu Sing	PH (DAP)
N69	Kemena	Stephen Rundi Utom (Minister)	GPS (PBB)
N70	Samalaju	Majang Renggi	GPS (PRS)
N71	Bekenu	Rosey Yunus (Note: Rosey Yunus contested the state election as a direct Barisan Nasional candidate, joining PBB on 16 August 2016.)(Assistant Minister)	GPS (PBB)
N72	Lambir	Ripin Lamat	GPS (PBB)
N73	Piasau	Sebastian Ting Chiew Yew (Assistant Minister)	GPS (SUPP)
N74	Pujut	Vacant (Note: Ting Tiong Choon who contested the state election as a DAP, PH candidate, was disqualified as an assemblyman by the Sarawak State Assembly due to his holding of dual Australian and Malaysian citizenship. A Federal Court upheld the ruling on 11 February 2020 after Ting tried to appeal the ruling. The Sarawak State assembly stated a by-election wasn't necessary as the date fell within two years of the dissolution of the state assembly in June 2021.)	
N75	Senadin	Lee Kim Shin(Minister)	GPS (SUPP)
N76	Marudi	Penguang Manggil (Assistant Minister)	GPS (PDP)
N77	Telang Usan	Dennis Ngau	GPS (PBB)
N78	Mulu	Gerawat Gala (Note: Its previous holder, James Jemut Masing from GPS (PRS), died in office on 31 October 2021. As he died close to next state election, a by-election will not be held to fill the vacancy.)(Deputy Speaker)	GPS (PBB)
N79	Bukit Kota	Abdul Rahman Ismail (Assistant Minister)	GPS (PBB)
N80	Batu Danau	Paulus Gumbang (Note: Paulus Gumbang contested the state election as a direct Barisan Nasional candidate, joining PBB on 16 August 2016.)	GPS (PBB)
N81	Ba'kelalan	Baru Bian (Note: Baru Bian contested the general election as a Pakatan Harapan (PKR) candidate, quit his party membership on 24 February 2020, becoming an independent and later joining the Sarawak United Party on 29 May 2020.)	PSB
N82	Bukit Sari	Awang Tengah Ali Hasan (Deputy Chief Minister)	GPS (PBB)
