= Sarawak Peoples' Party =

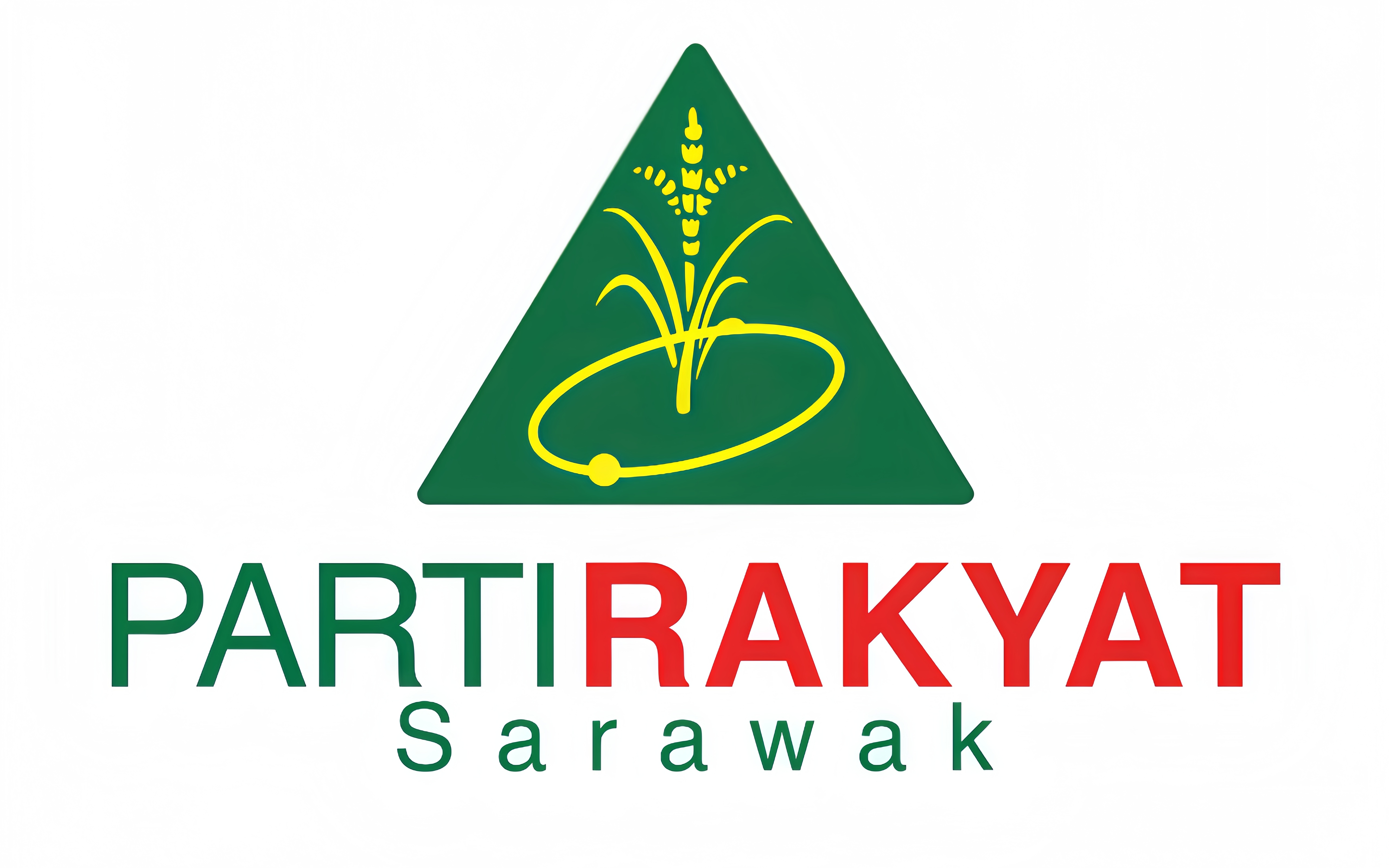
- Malay name: Parti Rakyat Sarawak
- President: John Sikie Tayai
- Secretary-General: Malcom Mussen Lamoh
- Deputy President: Majang Renggi
- Vice Presidents: Aaron Ago Dagang; Liwan Lagang; Wilson Ugak; Rita Sarimah Patrick Insol; Mong Dagang
- Youth Leader: Christopher Gira Sambang
- Women Leader: Doris Sophia Brodi
- Founder: James Jemut Masing; Sng Chee Hua
- Founded: 21 October 2004
- Split from: Parti Bansa Dayak Sarawak
- Headquarters: Lot 9029, Tingkat 1, Blok 11, Muara Tebas Land District, Jalan Wan Alwi, Tabuan Jaya, 93350 Kuching, Sarawak (current headquarters)
- Youth wing: Pergerakan Pemuda PRS
- Women's wing: Pergerakan Wanita PRS
- Political position: Centre
- National affiliation: Gabungan Parti Sarawak (since 2018) (Note: The party was formerly part of the Barisan Nasional (2004–2018). Through GPS was aligned with Perikatan Nasional (2020–2022) and is aligned with Barisan Nasional (since 2018)); National Unity Government (since 2022)
- Colours: Green, yellow, red
- Slogan: Parti Kitai, Parti Rakyat (Our Party, Our People)
- Dewan Negara: 1 / 70
- Dewan Rakyat: 5 / 31 (Sarawak seats)
- Sarawak State Legislative Assembly: 11 / 82
- Premier of Sarawak: 0 / 1 (Sarawak only)

Website
- prs.my

Sarawak Peoples' Party (Malay: Parti Rakyat Sarawak; abbrev: PRS) is a political party in Sarawak. It is led by John Sikie Tayai and forms the ruling coalition of Sarawak, Gabungan Parti Sarawak.

== History ==
The party was founded by a breakaway faction of Parti Bansa Dayak Sarawak led by the late Tan Sri Dr. James Jemut Masing and Dato' Sng Chee Hua. The party was registered on the same day PBDS was finally deregistered on 21 October 2004. The party was promptly accepted as member of the Barisan Nasional. A leadership tussle happened when in 2007 James Jemut Masing and Larry Sng both claimed to be the party president. The tussle resulted in revocation of Sng father and son's party membership for insubordination.

Following the fall of BN in the 2018 general election and in the aftermath of meeting between all Sarawak-based BN coalition parties on 12 June 2018, PRS left the coalition to form a new Sarawak-based coalition of Sarawak Parties Alliance. Following Masing's death in 2021, Joseph Salang Gandum took over as party president. He decided not to seek re-election in 2025 party election.

== Elected representatives ==
=== Dewan Negara (Senate) ===
==== Senators ====
- His Majesty's appointee:
  - Rita Sarimah Patrick Insol

=== Dewan Rakyat (House of Representatives) ===
==== Members of Parliament of the 15th Malaysian Parliament ====
PRS has 5 MPs in the House of Representatives.

State	No.	Parliament Constituency	Member	Party
Sarawak	P202	Sri Aman	Doris Sophia Brodi	PRS
Sarawak	P203	Lubok Antu	Roy Angau Gingkoi	PRS
Sarawak	P210	Kanowit	Aaron Ago Dagang	PRS
Sarawak	P214	Selangau	Edwin Banta	PRS
Sarawak	P216	Hulu Rajang	Wilson Ugak Kumbong	PRS
Total	Sarawak (5)			

=== Dewan Undangan Negeri (State Legislative Assembly) ===
==== Malaysian State Assembly Representatives ====
Sarawak State Legislative Assembly

11 / 82

State	No.	Parliamentary Constituency	No.	State Constituency	Member	Party
Sarawak	P202	Sri Aman	N30	Balai Ringin	Snowdan Lawan	PRS
Sarawak	P202	Sri Aman	N31	Bukit Begunan	Mong Dagang	PRS
Sarawak	P203	Lubok Antu	N34	Batang Ai	Malcom Mussen Lamoh	PRS
Sarawak	P210	Kanowit	N49	Ngemah	Anyi Jana	PRS
Sarawak	P214	Selangau	N59	Tamin	Christopher Gira Sambang	PRS
Sarawak	P214	Selangau	N60	Kakus	John Sikie Tayai	PRS
Sarawak	P215	Kapit	N61	Pelagus	Wilson Nyabong Ijang	PRS
Sarawak	P216	Hulu Rajang	N64	Baleh	Nicholas Kudi Jantai Masing	PRS
Sarawak	P216	Hulu Rajang	N65	Belaga	Liwan Lagang	PRS
Sarawak	P216	Hulu Rajang	N66	Murum	Kennedy Chukpai Ugon	PRS
Sarawak	P217	Bintulu	N70	Samalaju	Majang Renggi	PRS
Total	Sarawak (11)					

== Government offices ==
=== Ministerial posts ===
Portfolio	Office Bearer	Constituency
Minister of National Unity	Aaron Ago Dagang	Kanowit

Portfolio	Office Bearer	Constituency
Deputy Minister of Digital	Wilson Ugak Kumbong	Hulu Rajang

=== State government ===
- Sarawak (2004–present)

Note: bold as Premier/Chief Minister, italic as junior partner

== General election results ==
Election	Total seats won	Seats contested	Total votes	Share of votes	Outcome of election	Election leader
2004	6 / 219	6	33,410	0.42%	▲6 seats; Governing coalition (Barisan Nasional)	James Jemut Masing
2008	6 / 222	6	33,410	0.42%	▲6 seats; Governing coalition (Barisan Nasional)	James Jemut Masing
2013	6 / 222	6	59,540	0.54%	; Governing coalition (Barisan Nasional)	James Jemut Masing
2018	3 / 222	6	59,218	0.49%	▼3 seats; Opposition coalition (Barisan Nasional), later Governing coalition (Gabungan Parti Sarawak)	James Jemut Masing
2022	5 / 222	6	67,539	0.44%	▲2 seats; Governing coalition (Gabungan Parti Sarawak)	Joseph Salang Gandum

== State election results ==
Sarawak State Legislative Assembly
Election	Votes		Seats			Position (Note: As part of electoral coalition.)	Status
Election	Count	%	Result	Won / contested	+/–	Position	Status
2006	33,014	6.1	8 / 71	8 / 9	▲8	1st (Barisan Nasional)	BN
2011	35,137	5.2	8 / 71	8 / 9	Steady	1st (Barisan Nasional)	BN (Note: BN–TERAS–UPP (2013–2016))
2016	53,029	6.9	11 / 82	11 / 11	▲3	1st (Barisan Nasional)	BN (2016–2018) (Note: BN–UPP (2016–2018))
2016	53,029	6.9	11 / 82	11 / 11	▲3	1st (Barisan Nasional)	GPS (2018–2021) (Note: GPS–PSB (2018–2019), GPS–PN (2020–2021))
2021	50,423	6.8	11 / 82	11 / 11	Steady	1st (Gabungan Parti Sarawak)	GPS (Note: GPS–PSB (2023–2024))

== See also ==
- Politics of Malaysia
- List of political parties in Malaysia
