= Nicholas Kudi Jantai Masing =

Malaysian politician

Yang Berhormat Nicholas Kudi Jantai Masing MLA

Member of the Sarawak State Legislative Assembly for Baleh
- Incumbent
- Assumed office 2021
- Preceded by: James Jemut Masing

Personal details
- Born: Nicholas Kudi anak Jantai Masing Sarawak
- Citizenship: Malaysian
- Party: PRS
- Other political affiliations: Gabungan Parti Sarawak
- Relations: James Jemut Masing (uncle)
- Occupation: Politician

Nicholas Kudi anak Jantai Masing is a Malaysian politician from PRS. He has served as the Member of the Sarawak State Legislative Assembly for Baleh since 2021.

== Election results ==
Sarawak State Legislative Assembly
| Year | Constituency | Candidate | Votes | Pct. | Opponent(s) | Votes | Pct. | Ballots cast | Majority | Turnout |
|---|---|---|---|---|---|---|---|---|---|---|
| 2021 | N64 Baleh | Nicholas Kudi Jantai Masing (PRS) | 3,541 | 61.85% | Koh Kumbong (PSB) | 1,631 | 28.51% | 5,832 | 1,909 | 57.53% |
| 2021 | N64 Baleh | Nicholas Kudi Jantai Masing (PRS) | 3,541 | 61.85% | Kenneth Lagong (DAP) | 470 | 8.21% | 5,832 | 1,909 | 57.53% |
| 2021 | N64 Baleh | Nicholas Kudi Jantai Masing (PRS) | 3,541 | 61.85% | Sukarno @ Iskandar Abdullah (PBK) | 82 | 1.43% | 5,832 | 1,909 | 57.53% |
