= Edwin Banta =

Malaysian politician

Yang Berhormat Tuan Edwin Banta JBK MP

Member of the Malaysian Parliament for Selangau
- Incumbent
- Assumed office 19 November 2022
- Preceded by: Baru Bian (PH–PKR)
- Majority: 4,986 (2022)

Personal details
- Born: Edwin anak Banta; 27 March 1965 (age 61)
- Party: Parti Rakyat Sarawak (PRS)
- Other political affiliations: Gabungan Parti Sarawak (GPS)
- Occupation: Politician

Edwin anak Banta is a Malaysian politician who has served as the Member of Parliament (MP) for Selangau since November 2022. He is a member of the Parti Rakyat Sarawak (PRS), a component party of the Gabungan Parti Sarawak (GPS) coalition.

== Election results ==
Parliament of Malaysia
Year	Constituency	Candidate	Votes	Pct	Opponent(s)	Votes	Pct	Ballots cast	Majority	Turnout%
2022	P214 Selangau	Edwin Banta (PRS)	16,078	55.83%	Umpang Sabang (PKR)	11,092	38.52%	29,280	4,986	62.95%
2022	P214 Selangau	Edwin Banta (PRS)	16,078	55.83%	Henry Joseph Usau (IND)	1,626	5.25%	29,280	4,986	62.95%

== Honours ==
=== Honours of Malaysia ===
- Malaysia
  - Recipient of the 17th Yang di-Pertuan Agong Installation Medal (2024)
- Sarawak
  - Companion of the Order of the Star of Hornbill Sarawak (JBK) (2020)
