= Rita Sarimah Patrick Insol =

Malaysian politician

Yang Berhormat Senator Dato Rita Sarimah Patrick Insol PSBS AMN

Senator Appointed by the Yang di-Pertuan Agong
- Incumbent
- Assumed office 20 November 2023
- Monarchs: Abdullah (2023–2024); Ibrahim (2024-)
- Prime Minister: Anwar Ibrahim
- In office 22 June 2020 – 21 June 2023
- Monarch: Abdullah
- Prime Minister: Muhyiddin Yassin (2020–2021); Ismail Sabri Yaakob (2021–2022); Anwar Ibrahim (2022-2023)

Personal details
- Born: Rita Sarimah anak Patrick Insol
- Citizenship: Malaysian
- Party: Parti Rakyat Sarawak
- Other political affiliations: Barisan Nasional (till 2018); Gabungan Parti Sarawak (since 2018)
- Education: Heriot-Watt University; University of Malaya; Kolej Tun Datu Tuanku Haji Bujang
- Occupation: Politician

Rita Sarimah anak Patrick Insol is a Malaysian politician who has served as a Senator from June 2020 to June 2023 and was reappointed for a second term in November 2023. She is a member of the Parti Rakyat Sarawak (PRS), a component party of the Gabungan Parti Sarawak (GPS) coalition.

== Politics ==
She is currently the Deputy General Secretary of Parti Rakyat Sarawak.

== Election result ==
Parliament of Malaysia
Year	Constituency	Candidate	Votes	Pct	Opponent(s)	Votes	Pct	Ballots cast	Majority	Turnout
2018	P214 Selangau	Rita Sarimah Patrick Insol (PRS)	10,742	48.89%	Baru Bian (PKR)	11,228	51.11%	22,352	486	74.44%

== Honours ==
- Malaysia
  - Member of the Order of the Defender of the Realm (AMN) (2021)
  - Recipient of the 17th Yang di-Pertuan Agong Installation Medal
- Sarawak
  - Commander of the Most Exalted Order of the Star of Sarawak (PSBS) – Dato (2026)
