= Liwan Lagang =

Malaysian politician (born 1957)

Yang Berhormat Datuk Liwan Lagang PJN JBS KMN PPN MLA

State Deputy Minister of Utilities and Telecommunication of Sarawak (Telecommunication)
- Incumbent
- Assumed office 4 January 2022 Serving with Abdul Rahman Junaidi (Ulities)
- Minister: Julaihi Narawi
- Governor: Abdul Taib Mahmud Wan Junaidi Tuanku Jaafar
- Premier: Abang Abdul Rahman Johari Abang Openg

State Deputy Minister of Utilities of Sarawak (Rural Electricity)
- In office 21 August 2019 – 3 January 2022 Serving with Abdul Rahman Junaidi (Water Supply)
- Minister: Stephen Rundi Utom
- Governor: Abdul Taib Mahmud
- Chief Minister: Abang Abdul Rahman Johari Abang Openg
- Preceded by: Abdul Rahman Junaidi
- Constituency: Belaga

State Deputy Minister of Utilities of Sarawak (Water Supply)
- In office 6 May 2017 – 21 August 2019 Serving with Abdul Rahman Junaidi (Rural Electricity)
- Minister: Stephen Rundi Utom
- Governor: Abdul Taib Mahmud
- Chief Minister: Abang Abdul Rahman Johari Abang Openg
- Succeeded by: Abdul Rahman Junaidi
- Constituency: Belaga

State Deputy Minister of River Transportation and Safety of Sarawak
- In office 21 May 2016 – 6 May 2017
- Minister: James Jemut Masing (State Minister of Infrastructure Development and Transport)
- Governor: Abdul Taib Mahmud
- Chief Minister: Adenan Satem (2016–2017); Abang Abdul Rahman Johari Abang Openg (2017)
- Succeeded by: Jerip Susil
- Constituency: Belaga

State Deputy Minister of Culture and Heritage of Sarawak
- In office 30 September 2011 – 1 March 2014
- Minister: William Mawan Ikom
- Governor: Abang Muhammad Salahuddin
- Chief Minister: Abdul Taib Mahmud
- Constituency: Belaga

Youth Chief of the Parti Rakyat Sarawak
- President: James Jemut Masing
- Preceded by: Mong Dagang
- Succeeded by: Snowdan Lawan

Member of the Sarawak State Legislative Assembly for Belaga
- Incumbent
- Assumed office 20 May 2006
- Preceded by: Stanley Ajang Batok (BN–PBDS)
- Majority: 227 (2006); 2,928 (2011); 3,686 (2016); 2,245 (2021)

Personal details
- Born: 20 January 1958 (age 68) Crown Colony of Sarawak
- Citizenship: Malaysian
- Party: Parti Rakyat Sarawak (PRS)
- Other political affiliations: Barisan Nasional (BN) (–2018, allied : since 2020); Gabungan Parti Sarawak (GPS) (since 2020); Perikatan Nasional (PN) (2020–2022)
- Occupation: Politician

Liwan Lagang is a Malaysian politician from the Parti Rakyat Sarawak (PRS), a component party of the ruling Gabungan Parti Sarawak (GPS) coalition who has served as the State Deputy Minister of Telecommunication of Sarawak in charge of Telecommunication in the GPS state administration under Premier Abang Abdul Rahman Johari Abang Openg and State Minister Julaihi Narawi since January 2022 and Member of the Sarawak State Legislative Assembly (MLA) for Belaga since May 2006.

== Education ==
Liwan completed his Senior Cambridge education in Kanowit in 1975.

== Political career ==
After becoming a two-term state assemblyman by successfully defending his seat during the 2011 Sarawak state election, Liwan was appointed assistant minister for social development in charge of culture and heritage portfolio.

Between 2016 and 2017, Liwan was appointed as an assistant minister in charge of river transportation and safety.

In 2017, Chief Minister of Sarawak Abang Abdul Rahman Johari Abang Openg reshuffled his cabinet and reappointed Liwan to the water supplies portfolio.

On 22 August 2019, Chief Minister Abang Johari once again reshuffled his cabinet, with Lagang transferred to the Ministry of Utilities handling the rural electricity portfolio. He is one of the two assistant ministers to Dr. Stephen Rundi Utom at the ministry, alongside his successor to the water supplies portfolio, Dr. Abdul Rahman Junaidi.

On 30 December 2021, Chief Minister Abang Johari unveiled his new Cabinet lineup. Lagang was then appointed as Assistant Minister of Utilities and Telecommunication in charge of Telecommunication on 4 January 2022.

== Election results ==
Sarawak State Legislative Assembly
Year	Constituency	Candidate	Votes	Pct	Opponent(s)	Votes	Pct	Ballots cast	Majority	Turnout
2006	N57 Belaga	Liwan Lagang (PRS)	1,855	42.21%	Stanley Ajang Batok (IND)	1,628	37.04%	4,395	227	4,469
2006	N57 Belaga	Liwan Lagang (PRS)	1,855	42.21%	John Bampa (SNAP)	912	20.75%	4,395	227	4,469
2011	N57 Belaga	Liwan Lagang (PRS)	3,974	68.06%	Basah Kesing @ Ali Basah Kesing (PKR)	1,046	17.91%	5,839	2,928	5,913
2011	N57 Belaga	Liwan Lagang (PRS)	3,974	68.06%	John Bampa (SNAP)	368	6.30%	5,839	2,928	5,913
2011	N57 Belaga	Liwan Lagang (PRS)	3,974	68.06%	Kenneth Adan Silek (IND)	330	5.65%	5,839	2,928	5,913
2011	N57 Belaga	Liwan Lagang (PRS)	3,974	68.06%	Michael Jok (IND)	94	1.61%	5,839	2,928	5,913
2011	N57 Belaga	Liwan Lagang (PRS)	3,974	68.06%	Mathew Munan (IND)	27	0.45%	5,839	2,928	5,913
2016	N57 Belaga	Liwan Lagang (PRS)	4,149	89.96%	Alexander Lehan (PKR)	463	10.04%	4,612	3,686	4,674
2021	N57 Belaga	Liwan Lagang (PRS)	3,552	70.52%	Henry Usat Bit (PSB)	1,307	25.95%	5,037	2,245	62.94%
2021	N57 Belaga	Liwan Lagang (PRS)	3,552	70.52%	John Bampa (PBK)	97	1.93%	5,037	2,245	62.94%
2021	N57 Belaga	Liwan Lagang (PRS)	3,552	70.52%	Siki Balarik (IND)	81	1.61%	5,037	2,245	62.94%

== Honours ==
- Malaysia
  - Commander of the Order of Meritorious Service (PJN) – Datuk (2017)
  - Officer of the Order of the Defender of the Realm (KMN) (2009)
  - Medal of the Order of the Defender of the Realm (PPN) (1997)
- Sarawak
  - Companion of the Most Exalted Order of the Star of Sarawak (JBS) (2015)

== See also ==
- Belaga (state constituency)
