= Wilson Nyabong Ijang =

Malaysian politician (born 1959)

Yang Berhormat Tuan Wilson Nyabong Ijang JBS KMN AMN MLA

Member of the Sarawak State Legislative Assembly for Pelagus, Sarawak
- Incumbent
- Assumed office 7 May 2016

Sarawak Political Secretary to Chief Minister
- In office 17 March 2010 – 7 May 2016

Personal details
- Born: 8 June 1959 (age 66) Crown Colony of Sarawak (now Sarawak, Malaysia)
- Citizenship: Malaysian
- Party: Barisan Nasional - Parti Rakyat Sarawak (PRS) (2004–2018); Sarawak Parties Alliance (GPS) - Parti Rakyat Sarawak (PRS) (2018–now)
- Spouse: Seriah Thomas
- Children: 5 (2 sons and 3 daughters)

Wilson Nyabong Ijang (born 8 June 1959) is a Malaysian politician. He is the member of Sarawak State Legislative Assembly for Pelagus constituency in Sarawak, Malaysia since 2016 representing Parti Rakyat Sarawak (PRS), then was part of Barisan Nasional (BN) and now Sarawak Parties Alliance (GPS). Following the fall of BN in the 2018 General Election and in the aftermath of meeting between all Sarawak-based BN coalition parties including PRS on 12 June 2018, had decided to leave the coalition to form a new Sarawak-based coalition of GPS. He was first elected after winning a majority at DUN Pelagus in the 11th Sarawak State Election 2016. He is now in his second term after winning a majority in the 12th Sarawak State Election 2021. He is currently a supreme council member of local ruling party, PRS.

From 2010 to 2016 he served as Sarawak Political Secretary to the Chief Minister. He is a former Petronas officer in supply chain department, graduated with Advanced Diploma in Logistics and Transport Management at The Chartered Institute of Logistics and Transport (CILT-UK) in United Kingdom as well as Electrical Power Engineering from Mara Technical Institute, Kuala Lumpur. In October 2025, he was awarded the prestigious Chartered Fellow (FCILT) by The Chartered Institute of Logistics and Transport (CILT).

== Election results ==
Sarawak State Legislative Assembly
Year	Constituency	Government	Votes	Pct	Opposition	Votes	Pct	Ballots cast	Majority	Turnout
2016	Pelagus	Wilson Nyabong Ijang (PRS)	3,778	82.26%	Frankie Bendindang Manjah (DAP)	494	10.76%	4,665	3,284	64.92%
2016	Pelagus	Wilson Nyabong Ijang (PRS)	3,778	82.26%	Yong Anak Sibat (IND)	321	6.99%	4,665	3,284	64.92%
2021	Pelagus	Wilson Nyabong Ijang (PRS)	2,843	56.28%	Kristoffer Nyuak Bajok (PSB)	1,794	35.51%	5,051	1,049	65.28%
2021	Pelagus	Wilson Nyabong Ijang (PRS)	2,843	56.28%	Solomon Kumbong (DAP)	250	4.94%	5,051	1,049	65.28%
2021	Pelagus	Wilson Nyabong Ijang (PRS)	2,843	56.28%	Nyambong Anak Sibat (PBK)	88	1.74%	5,051	1,049	65.28%
2021	Pelagus	Wilson Nyabong Ijang (PRS)	2,843	56.28%	Moses Ripai (PBDSB)	76	1.50%	5,051	1,049	65.28%

== Honours ==
- Malaysia
  - Member of the Order of the Defender of the Realm (AMN) (2010)
  - Officer of the Order of the Defender of the Realm (KMN) (2014)
- Sarawak
  - Companion of the Most Exalted Order of the Star of Sarawak (JBS) (2021)
  - Silver Medal of the Sarawak Independence Diamond Jubilee Medal (2024)
