= Zabri Abd Wahid =

Malaysian politician

Yang Berbahagia Dato' Zabri Abd Wahid DPMP PMP

Member of the Perak State Legislative Assembly for Trong
- In office 5 May 2013 – 9 May 2018
- Preceded by: Rosli Husin (BN–UMNO)
- Succeeded by: Jamilah Zakaria (BN–UMNO)
- Majority: 1,804 (2013)

Personal details
- Party: United Malays National Organisation (UMNO)
- Other political affiliations: Barisan Nasional (BN)

Zabri bin Abd Wahid is a Malaysian politician who served as Member of the Perak State Legislative Assembly (MLA) for Trong from May 2013 to May 2018. He is a member of United Malays National Organisation (UMNO), a component party of Barisan Nasional (BN) coalitions.

== Election results ==
Perak State Legislative Assembly
Year	Constituency	Candidate	Votes	Pct	Opponent(s)	Votes	Pct	Ballots cast	Majority	Turnout
2013	N15 Trong	Zabri Abd Wahid (UMNO)	6,353	58.27%	Norazli Musa (PAS)	4,549	41.73%	11,081	1,804	85.00%

== Honours ==
- Perak
  - Knight Commander of the Order of the Perak State Crown (DPMP) – Dato' (2014)
  - Commander of the Order of the Perak State Crown (PMP) (2008)
