= James Jemut Masing =

Malaysian politician (1949–2021)

Yang Berbahagia Tan Sri Datuk Amar Dr. James Jemut Masing PSM DA PNBS

Deputy Chief Minister of Sarawak
- In office 13 May 2016 – 31 October 2021 Serving with Douglas Uggah Embas; Awang Tengah Ali Hasan
- Governor: Abdul Taib Mahmud
- Chief Minister: Adenan Satem; Abang Abdul Rahman Zohari
- Preceded by: George Chan Hong Nam
- Succeeded by: Sim Kui Hian
- Constituency: Baleh

1st President of the Parti Rakyat Sarawak
- In office 21 March 2004 – 31 October 2021
- Secretary-General: Joseph Salang Gandum; Janang Bungsu
- Preceded by: Position established
- Succeeded by: Joseph Salang Gandum (acting)

Ministerial roles (Sarawak)
- 2011–2016: Minister for Land Development
- 2016–2021: Minister of Infrastructure Development and Transportation
- 2017–2021: Minister of Infrastructure and Ports Development

Faction represented in Sarawak State Legislative Assembly
- 1983–2018: Barisan Nasional
- 1983–2004: Sarawak Native People's Party
- 2004–2021: Sarawak Peoples' Party
- 2018–2021: Sarawak Parties Alliance

Personal details
- Born: 5 March 1949 Baleh, Kapit, Crown Colony of Sarawak (now Sarawak, Malaysia)
- Died: 31 October 2021 (aged 72) Normah Sarawak Medical Centre, Petra Jaya, Kuching, Sarawak, Malaysia
- Resting place: Nirvana Memorial Park, Siniawan, Kuching
- Party: Parti Bansa Dayak Sarawak (PBDS) (1983–2004); Sarawak Peoples' Party (PRS) (2004–2021)
- Other political affiliations: Barisan Nasional (BN) (2004–2018); Sarawak Parties Alliance (GPS) (2018–2021)
- Spouse(s): Fiona Frances Henderson (m. 1977; div. 1989) Corrine Connie Bua Nyipa (m. 1992)
- Children: 5 (2 daughters - Fiona and 1 son 2 daughters - Corrine)
- Education: Victoria University of Wellington; Australian National University

Tan Sri Datuk Amar Dr. James Jemut Masing (5 March 1949 – 31 October 2021) was a Malaysian politician who served as the Deputy Chief Minister, State Minister of Infrastructure and Ports Development of Sarawak under Chief Ministers Adenan Satem and Abang Abdul Rahman Johari Abang Openg as well as Member of the Sarawak State Legislative Assembly (MLA) for Baleh from May 2016, January 2017 and December 1983 to his death in October 2021 respectively.

He was a member of the Parti Bangsa Dayak Sarawak (PBDS) and later Parti Rakyat Sarawak (PRS), a component party of the ruling Gabungan Parti Sarawak (GPS) coalition. He also served as President of PRS from its founding in March 2004 to his death in October 2021.

== Background ==
Masing born on 5 March 1949 at Baleh, Kapit, Sarawak, was an ethnic Iban and a Christian. Masing had studied and graduated with B.A. in Education in 1975 from Victoria University of Wellington, New Zealand under the Colombo Plan Scholarship. He also received both his M.A. in 1978 and Ph.D. in Anthropology in 1981 from Australian National University, the first Iban to achieve that.

== Political career ==
Masing started his political career when he joined and climbed to be the Vice-President of the now defunct Parti Bansa Dayak Sarawak (PBDS) before becoming the co-founding and 1st President of the Sarawak Peoples' Party or Parti Rakyat Sarawak (PRS) since 2004 until 2021. Even though he never became a federal Member of Parliament (MP), Masing had served for eight consecutive terms as MLA for Baleh under the two parties from 1983 to 2021. He also rose to be the Deputy Chief Minister of Sarawak from 2016 to his death in 2021. He could have contested and perhaps have defended the Baleh seat for the ninth consecutive time if not because of the deferment of a supposedly earlier 2021 Sarawak state election due to 2021 state of emergencies, arising from the 2020–21 political crisis and the COVID-19 pandemic, as well as his untimely death.

== Controversies ==
Masing's reported political persecution of disabled Dayaks and his admission that he and his deputy sought inducements for Native Customary Lands (NCR) exploitation for plantations in 2012. He had also benefited from lucrative Belian timber concessions, huge state contracts, plantation licences on NCR, a partnership with an international oil company and a prized car dealership licence. The Forest Department's information reveals the timber concessions in the Baram were handed out to key political associates of state Barisan Nasional (BN) including Governor Abdul Taib Mahmud, local Baram MP, Jacob Dungau Sagan and even his wife Corinne Masing was one of the beneficiaries. His extravangant wealth and luxury mansion had also led to the corruption suspicions as well as allegations.

Masing who was Sarawak's Land Development Minister then, had been blamed for not protecting the NCR lands where Dayak natives who have been residing, carrying out agriculture and traditional living activities in a particular NCR region for generations, which they are granted such NCR lands ownership, albeit the land legally belongs to the state and without a physical individual title. In 2013, Sarawak Workers Party (SWP) reproached, had urged all Dayaks to accept an announcement of a RM30 million fund by the Prime Minister for NCR land perimeter survey under Section 6 of the State Land Code exercise which would keep the NCR as communal reserves land. In 2020 again, Gabungan Anak Sarawak (GASAK) rebuked Masing over the sale of NCR land in Sarawak and comments the natives would become landless if their NCR lands are being surveyed under Section 18 of the State Land Code which instead will allow individual Dayaks owners to have individual titles, rights and authority over that NCR land. Masing was told not to treat the Dayaks as second class Bumiputera and stop making them only ordinary farmers, when he should have been leading the community towards prosperity rather than taking care of the interests of the cronies and the state government under Gabungan Parti Sarawak (GPS).

== Personal life ==
He was first married to Fiona Frances Masing née Henderson in 1977, but they had divorced in 1989. Together the couple have two daughters, Dr Anna Sulan Masing born in 1981 and Rachel Lian Masing in 1983. He married again for the second time in 1992 to Corrine Masing née Bua Nyipa, also known as Connie with whom he had three more children; Karen Julan Masing, Ashley Layo Masing and Emma Maria Masing.

== Death ==
On 28 September 2021, fully vaccinated Masing tested positive for COVID-19 and was admitted to the intensive care unit (ICU) of Sarawak General Hospital (SGH). He was later transferred to Normah Sarawak Medical Centre (NSMC) in Petra Jaya after his condition deteriorated from Stage 3 to Stage 5, where he succumbed to various complications at 7.05 a.m., on 31 October at the age of 72. Further COVID-19 screening test result conducted on his body reported that he died of post-COVID heart conditions. His remains were brought to his residence at Jalan Ong Tiang Swee for state funeral, service and wake arrangement according to the COVID-19 pandemic standard operating procedure (SOP). On 3 November, the remains were transferred to the Association of Churches in Sarawak (ACS), Jalan Stampin as a ceremony held at Christian Ecumenical Worship Centre for the public to pay their last respects to the late politician. Among the dignitaries present were Chief Minister Abang Abdul Rahman Zohari Abang Openg and his deputy Douglas Uggah Embas. Masing's remains and coffin was later taken to the Nirvana Memorial Park in Siniawan, Kuching-Bau Road for the last rites whereas a short Christian funeral service in Iban was held before burial and being laid to rest.

== Election results ==
Sarawak State Legislative Assembly
Year	Constituency	Candidate	Votes	Pct	Opponent(s)	Votes	Pct	Ballots cast	Majority	Turnout
1983	Baleh, Sarawak	James Jemut Masing (PBDS)	2,717	47.98%	Peter Gani Kiai (BN)	1,646	29.07%	5,787	1,071	71.86%
1983	Baleh, Sarawak	James Jemut Masing (PBDS)	2,717	47.98%	Joseph Jinggut (IND)	1,300	22.95%	5,787	1,071	71.86%
1987	Baleh, Sarawak	James Jemut Masing (PBDS)	3,516	59.18%	Joseph Jinggut (BN)	2,425	40.82%	6,039	1,091	70.79%
1991	Baleh, Sarawak	James Jemut Masing (PBDS)	4,183	67.15%	Simon Temenggong Sibat (BN)	1,858	29.83%	6,306	2,325	71.91%
1991	Baleh, Sarawak	James Jemut Masing (PBDS)	4,183	67.15%	Ngalambong Limbing (IND)	188	3.02%	6,306	2,325	71.91%
1996	Baleh, Sarawak	James Jemut Masing (PBDS)	5,411	87.66%	John Pungga (IND)	762	12.34%	6,334	4,649	65.77%
2001	Baleh, Sarawak	James Jemut Masing (PBDS)	6,378	94.29%	Stephen Nyamok Medan (IND)	386	5.71%	6,861	5,992	70.02%
2006	Baleh, Sarawak	James Jemut Masing (PRS)	5,330	90.99%	Lucius Jimbon (SNAP)	528	9.01%	5,956	4,802	61.20%
2011	Baleh, Sarawak	James Jemut Masing (PRS)	5,242	79.59%	Bendindang Manjah (PKR)	1,344	20.41%	6,684	3,898	59.22%
2016	Baleh, Sarawak	James Jemut Masing (PRS)	5,272	91.67%	Agop Linsong (DAP)	479	8.33%	5,820	4,793	60.47%

== Honours ==
=== Awards and recognitions ===
- Guinness Stout Effort Award, 1982.
- Jaycees Malaysia Award, 1986.

=== Honours of Malaysia ===
- Malaysia
  - Commander of the Order of Loyalty to the Crown of Malaysia (PSM) – Tan Sri (2011)
- Sarawak
  - Knight Commander of the Order of the Star of Hornbill Sarawak (DA) – Datuk Amar (2013)
  - Knight Commander of the Order of the Star of Sarawak (PNBS) – Dato Sri (1998)

== See also ==
- List of deaths due to COVID-19 - notable individual deaths
