= Belaga (state constituency) =

Belaga (N65)
Sarawak constituency

State constituency
- Legislature: Sarawak State Legislative Assembly
MLA
Vacant
- Constituency created: 1968
- First contested: 1969
- Last contested: 2026

Belaga is a state constituency in Sarawak, Malaysia, that has been represented in the Sarawak State Legislative Assembly since 1969.

The state constituency was created in the 1968 redistribution and is mandated to return a single member to the Sarawak State Legislative Assembly under the first past the post voting system.

== Demographics ==
Ethnic breakdown of Belaga's electorate as of 2022
1. Sarawak bumiputera (92.1%)
2. Malay-Muslim bumiputera (3.70%)
3. Chinese (3.10%)
4. Other ethnicities (1.10%)

== History ==
As of 2020, Belaga has a population of 13,076 people.

=== Polling districts ===
According to the gazette issued on 31 October 2022, the Belaga constituency has a total of 7 polling districts.

State constituency	Polling District	Code	Location
Belaga (N65)	Data Kakus	216/65/01	SMK Data Kakus
Belaga (N65)	Merit	216/65/02	SK Ng. Merit; RH Danggat Ng Mujan; RH Berundang Ng Ensawi; RH Guyang Ng Jeli; RH Entili Ng, Musa; RH Empang Ng Bilat Ulu Paku; RH Gendang Sg. Pila; RH Aji Ng. Ibun Pilla; RH Mero Lubok Dabai; RH Ranying Ulu Metah; RH Pillai Ng Metah; RH Setepan Ng Pila; SK Ng, Metah; RH Jamit Ng. Latap Pilla
Belaga (N65)	Ba	216/65/03	Uma Punan Biau; Uma Punan Sama; Uma Tanjong Lg. Pawah; SK Airport; Uma Sekapan Piit; Uma Balo Kesing Lg. Amo
Belaga (N65)	Belaga	216/65/04	SK Abun Matu; Uma Kahei Lg. Makero; Uma Aging Lg. Daah; Uma Lahanan Lg. Semuang; Uma Kejaman Neh Lg. Liten; Uma Apan Long Menjawah; Uma Nyaving Long Menjawah; SK. Lg. Segahan; Dewan UmaAging, Naha Jalei, Long Kebuho
Belaga (N65)	Long Busang	216/65/05	SK Long Busang
Belaga (N65)	Long Bangan	216/65/06	Uma Jangan Lg. Bangan
Belaga (N65)	Long Semutut	216/65/07	SK Uma Sambop; Long Nanyan

=== Representation history ===
Members of the Legislative Assembly for Belaga
Assembly	No	Years	Member	Party
Constituency created
8th	N40	1970-1974	Nyipa Kilah @ Nyipa Bato	SUPP
9th	N40	1974-1979	Nyipa Kilah @ Nyipa Bato	BN (SUPP)
10th	N40	1979-1983	Tajang Laing	Independent
11th	N40	1983-1987	Tajang Laing	BN (PBB)
12th	N40	1987-1991	Nyipa Kilah @ Nyipa Bato	PERMAS
13th	N48	1991-1996	Nyipa Kilah @ Nyipa Bato	BN (PBDS)
14th	N51	1996-2001	Stanley Ajang Batok	BN (PBDS)
15th	N51	2001–2004	Stanley Ajang Batok	BN (PBDS)
15th	N51	2004-2006	Stanley Ajang Batok	BN (PRS)
16th	N57	2006-2011	Liwan Lagang	BN (PRS)
17th	N57	2011–2016	Liwan Lagang	BN (PRS)
18th	N65	2016–2018	Liwan Lagang	BN (PRS)
18th	N65	2018-2021	Liwan Lagang	GPS (PRS)
19th	N65	2021–2026	Liwan Lagang	GPS (PRS)

== Election results ==
Sarawak state election, 2026
Party	Candidate	Votes	%	∆%
GPS				▲
PH				▲
Total valid votes				
Total rejected ballots				
Unreturned ballots				
Turnout				
Registered electors				
Majority				

Sarawak state election, 2021
Party	Candidate	Votes	%	∆%
GPS	Liwan Lagang	3,552	70.52	▲70.52
PSB	Henry Usat Bit	1,307	25.95	▲25.95
PBK	John Bampa	97	1.93	▲1.93
Independent	Siki Balarik	81	1.61	▲1.61
Total valid votes		5,037	100.00	
Total rejected ballots		40		
Unreturned ballots		19		
Turnout		5,096	63.68	
Registered electors		8,003		
Majority		2,245		
GPS gain from BN		Swing		?
Source(s) https://lom.agc.gov.my/ilims/upload/portal/akta/outputp/1718688/PUB687.pdf

Sarawak state election, 2016
Party	Candidate	Votes	%	∆%
BN	Liwan Lagang	4,149	89.96	▲21.90
PKR	Alexander Lehan	463	10.04	▼7.87
Total valid votes		4,612	100.00	
Total rejected ballots		51		
Unreturned ballots		11		
Turnout		4,674	65.87	
Registered electors		7,096		
Majority		3,686		
BN hold		Swing		
Source(s) "Federal Government Gazette - Notice of Contested Election, State Legislative Assembly of the State of Sarawak [P.U. (B) 190/2016]" (PDF). Attorney General's Chambers of Malaysia. 25 April 2016. Archived from the original (PDF) on 12 June 2017. "Senarai Calon yang Disahkan Layak Bertanding Pilihan Raya Dewan Undangan Negeri ke-11". Election Commission of Malaysia. 25 April 2016. Archived from the original on 2016-04-25.

Sarawak state election, 2011
Party	Candidate	Votes	%	∆%
BN	Liwan Lagang	3,974	68.06	▲25.85
PKR	Basah Kesing @ Ali Basah Kesing	1,046	17.91	▲17.91
SNAP	John Bampa	368	6.30	▼14.45
Independent	Kenneth Adan Silek	330	5.65	▲5.65
Independent	Michael Jok	94	1.61	▲1.61
Independent	Mathew Munan	27	0.45	▲0.45
Total valid votes		5,839	100.00	
Total rejected ballots		74		
Unreturned ballots		0		
Turnout		5,913	69.87	
Registered electors		8,463		
Majority		2,928		
BN hold		Swing		
Source(s) "Federal Government Gazette - Results of Contested Election and Statements of the Poll after the Official Addition of Votes Sarawak [P.U. (B) 245/2011]" (PDF). Attorney General's Chambers of Malaysia. 29 April 2011.

Sarawak state election, 2006
Party	Candidate	Votes	%	∆%
BN	Liwan Lagang	1,855	42.21	▼17.70
Independent	Stanley Ajang Batok	1,628	37.04	▲37.04
SNAP	John Bampa	912	20.75	▲20.75
Total valid votes		4,395	100.00	
Total rejected ballots		63		
Unreturned ballots		11		
Turnout		4,469	66.79	
Registered electors		6,691		
Majority		227		
BN hold		Swing		

Sarawak state election, 2001
Party	Candidate	Votes	%	∆%
BN	Stanley Ajang Batok	2,451	59.91	▲20.69
Independent	Mai Lagiw	1,128	27.57	▲6.65
PKR	Raymond Abin Bira Laing	512	12.52	▲12.52
Total valid votes		4,091	100.00	
Total rejected ballots		95		
Unreturned ballots		7		
Turnout		4,193	64.75	
Registered electors		6,476		
Majority		1,324		
BN hold		Swing		

Sarawak state election, 1996
Party	Candidate	Votes	%	∆%
BN	Stanley Ajang Batok	1,646	39.22	▼36.67
Independent	Mai Lagiw	878	20.92	▲20.92
Independent	Raymond Abin Bira Laing	613	14.61	▲14.61
Independent	Daniel Levoh Imang	613	14.61	▲14.61
Independent	Stem Liau	233	5.55	▲5.55
Independent	Wesley Ngo	214	5.10	▲5.10
Total valid votes		4,197	100.00	
Total rejected ballots		101		
Unreturned ballots		0		
Turnout		4,298	69.48	
Registered electors		6,186		
Majority		768		
BN hold		Swing		

Sarawak state election, 1991
Party	Candidate	Votes	%	∆%
BN	Nyipa Kilah @ Nyipa Bato	2,884	75.89	
PBDS	Raymond Abin Bira Laing	825	21.71	
DAP	Helen Bira Sten	91	2.39	
Total valid votes		3,800	100.00	
Total rejected ballots		73		
Unreturned ballots		10		
Turnout		3,883	74.17	
Registered electors		5,235		
Majority		2,059		
BN gain from PERMAS		Swing		?

Sarawak state election, 1987
Party	Candidate	Votes	%	∆%
PERMAS	Nyipa Kilah @ Nyipa Bato			
[[|]]				
Total valid votes			100.00	
Total rejected ballots				
Unreturned ballots				
Turnout				
Registered electors				
Majority				
PERMAS gain from BN		Swing		?

Sarawak state election, 1983
Party	Candidate	Votes	%	∆%
BN	Tajang Laing			
[[|]]				
Total valid votes			100.00	
Total rejected ballots				
Unreturned ballots				
Turnout				
Registered electors				
Majority				
BN gain from Independent		Swing		?

Sarawak state election, 1979
Party	Candidate	Votes	%	∆%
Independent	Tajang Laing			
[[|]]				
Total valid votes			100.00	
Total rejected ballots				
Unreturned ballots				
Turnout				
Registered electors				
Majority				
Independent gain from BN		Swing		?

Sarawak state election, 1974
Party	Candidate	Votes	%	∆%
BN	Nyipa Kilah @ Nyipa Bato			
Independent	Tajang Laing			
Total valid votes			100.00	
Total rejected ballots				
Unreturned ballots				
Turnout				
Registered electors				
Majority		37		
BN gain from SUPP		Swing		?

Sarawak state election, 1969
Party	Candidate	Votes	%	∆%
SUPP	Nyipa Kilah @ Nyipa Bato	772	36.19	
PESAKA	Tajang Laing	688	32.26	
Independent	Matu Puso	606	28.41	
SNAP	Lisut Tinggang	67	3.14	
Total valid votes		2,133	100.00	
Total rejected ballots		136		
Unreturned ballots				
Turnout		2,269	74.96	
Registered electors		3,027		
Majority		84		
This was a new constituency created.
