= Gabungan Parti Sarawak =

Political alliance in Sarawak

- English name: Sarawak Parties Alliance
- Abbreviation: GPS
- Chairman: Abang Johari
- Secretary-General: Alexander Nanta Linggi
- Deputy Chairman: Awang Tengah Ali Hasan; Douglas Uggah Embas
- Vice Chairmen: Sim Kui Hian; Tiong King Sing; John Sikie Tayai
- Founder: Abang Johari
- Founded: 12 June 2018; 8 years ago
- Legalised: 19 November 2018
- Split from: Barisan Nasional (BN)
- Headquarters: Kuching, Sarawak
- Newspaper: Jiwa Bakti; The Borneo Post; Suara Sarawak; Sarawak Tribune; Sa'ati; Media GPS (TikTok)
- Ideology: Sarawak nationalism Bumiputera interests National conservatism Self-determination; Sarawak and Sabah unity Social justice Self-governance rights Sarawak autonomy rights
- Political position: Centre-right to right-wing
- National affiliation: Barisan Nasional (from 1973) (Note: 1973 to 2018 as Barisan Nasional Sarawak, electoral pact since 2018); Perikatan Nasional (2020–2022) (Note: Junior partner in a coalition government); National Unity Government (since 2022)
- Member parties: PBB; PDP; SUPP; PRS
- Colours: Red, white and black
- Slogan: Utamakan Sarawak (Sarawak First)
- Anthem: GPS Utamakan Sarawak (GPS Prioritises Sarawak)
- Dewan Negara: 6 / 70
- Dewan Rakyat: 23 / 31 (Sarawak seats)
- Sarawak State Legislative Assembly: 79 / 82
- Premier of Sarawak: 1 / 1

Election symbol

Party flag

Website
- www.mygps.com.my

Gabungan Parti Sarawak (GPS; English: Sarawak Parties Alliance) is a Sarawak-based political alliance in Malaysia. It was established in 2018 by four former Barisan Nasional (BN) component parties operating solely in Sarawak following the federal coalition's defeat in the 2018 Malaysian general election. It is currently the fourth largest political coalition with 23 seats in the Dewan Rakyat and forms the government in the state of Sarawak.

== History ==
=== Formation ===
GPS was formed on 12 June 2018, consisting of Parti Pesaka Bumiputera Bersatu (PBB), Progressive Democratic Party (PDP), Sarawak United Peoples' Party (SUPP), and Parti Rakyat Sarawak (PRS). The four parties were former component parties in Barisan Nasional (BN) coalition, with a gentleman's agreement that Peninsular or Sabah based parties within BN would never establish themselves in Sarawak, thus giving the parties a relative autonomy. The coalition focuses on the state's interests and rights based on the Malaysia Agreement and remain an opposition at the Pakatan Harapan (PH) federal government despite the readiness to "cooperate and collaborate". On 23 August 2018, its chairman, Abang Abdul Rahman Zohari Abang Openg, announced that GPS Gabungan Parti Sarawak has been registered and is awaiting the issuance of the official letter from the Registrar of Societies (RoS). The coalition was finally legalised on 19 November 2018.

=== Policy ===
As the component parties of GPS quit BN en bloc, it inherits BN's former place and dominance in Sarawak politics. The party claimed to continue the legacy of Adenan Satem, a relatively popular former Sarawak's chief minister, who led BN Sarawak to its triumph in 2016 state election on basis of greater autonomy of Sarawak. Although the party pushed for constitutional amendments in accordance to 1963 Malaysian Agreement, its policy did not mention an outright Sarawak independence, rather it prefers to work within existing laws to regain what it calls as Sarawak's rights. The coalition launched its party policy in Kuching on 19 January 2019. It often received condemnation from opposition parties in Sarawak and foreign observers for continuing abuse of government powers, such as uneven allocation of aid and development and perceived punishment toward ethnic chiefs not aligned with the government. The party also directly or indirectly controlled most major media publications in Sarawak.

In 2018 a remark by then Finance Minister Lim Guan Eng claiming Sarawak would be bankrupt within 3 years was met with backlash from GPS leaders. The Sarawak government under GPS prioritised building state revenues capable to fund infrastructure without burdening state budget.

=== Political crisis ===
Following the political crisis in 2020 (which saw the PH government lose its majority in the Dewan Rakyat), GPS entered into an agreement by declaring support for the new government coalition, Perikatan Nasional (PN). GPS chairman, however, maintained that the agreement will not see GPS become a member of PN, but will remain as a partner instead. A week after PN's prime ministerial pick, Muhyiddin Yassin, was sworn in as the new premier, he announced his cabinet which saw four MPs from GPS appointed full ministers, and five others as deputy ministers.

=== Elections ===
GPS made its maiden electoral appearance in 2021 Sarawak state election. The election was marked as a huge success for the party, as it increased control over Sarawak State Legislative Assembly by winning 76 out of 82 seats contested.

== Member parties ==
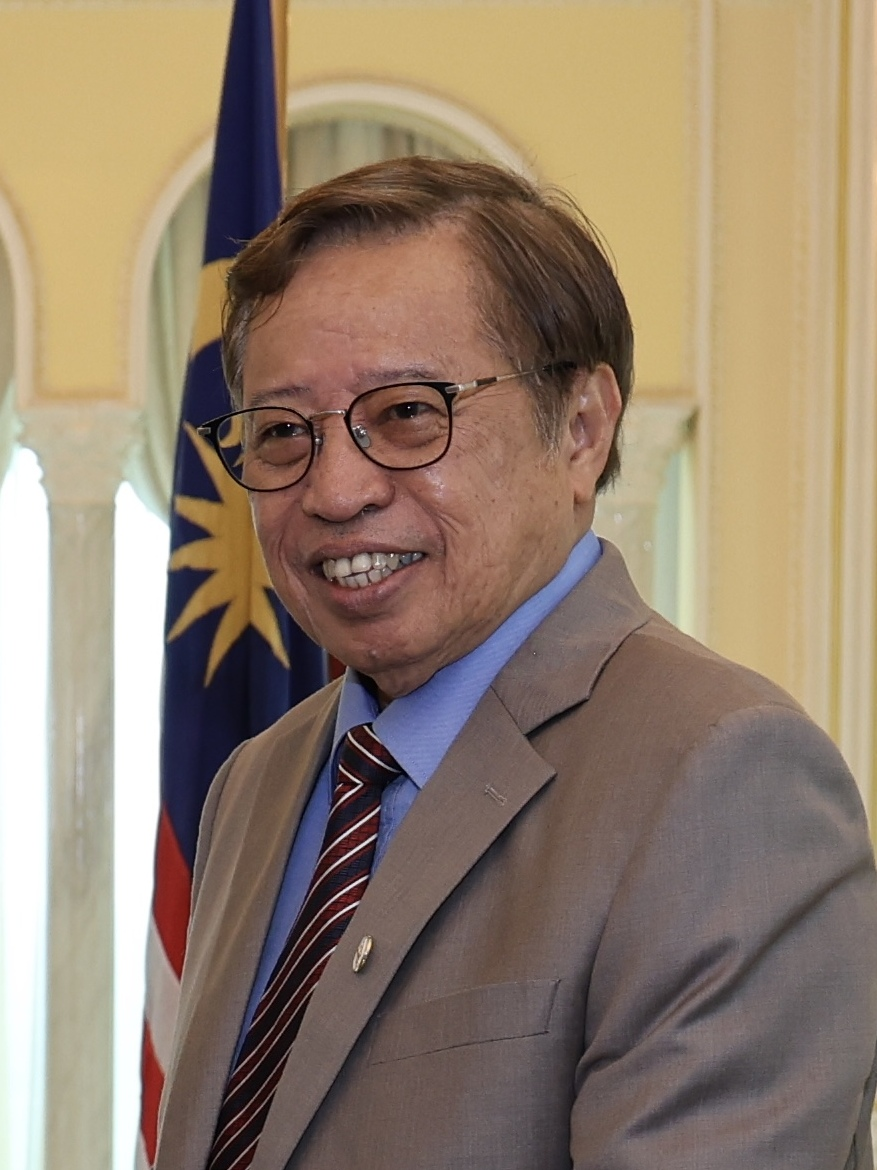
Abang Abdul Rahman Zohari Abang Openg, the incumbent Chairman of Gabungan Parti Sarawak (GPS) and President of the Parti Pesaka Bumiputera Bersatu (PBB).

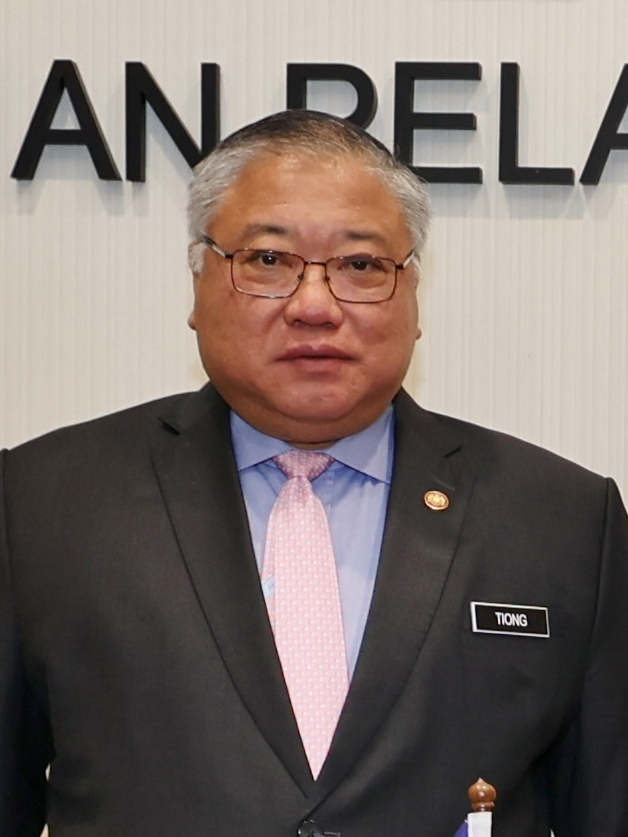
Tiong King Sing, President of the Progressive Democratic Party (PDP).

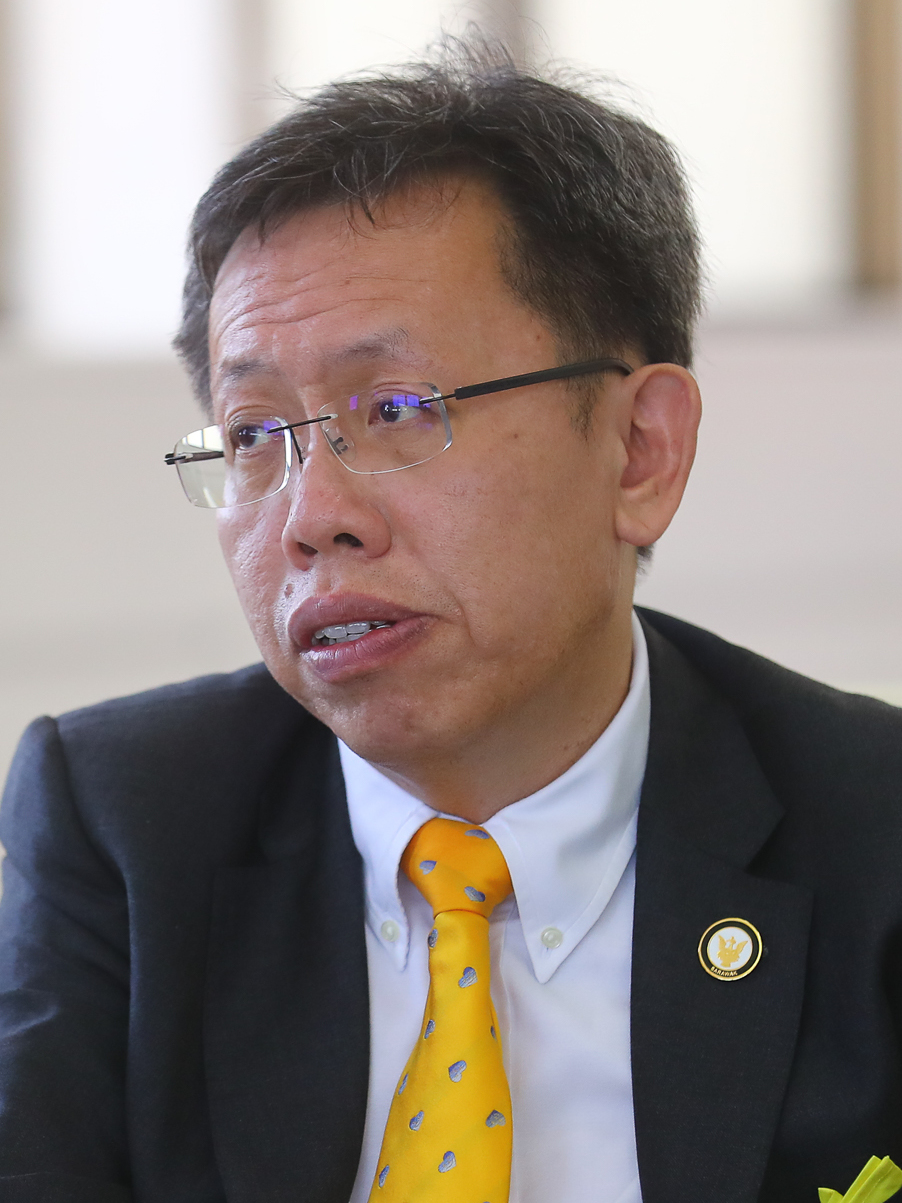
Sim Kui Hian, President of the Sarawak United Peoples' Party (SUPP).

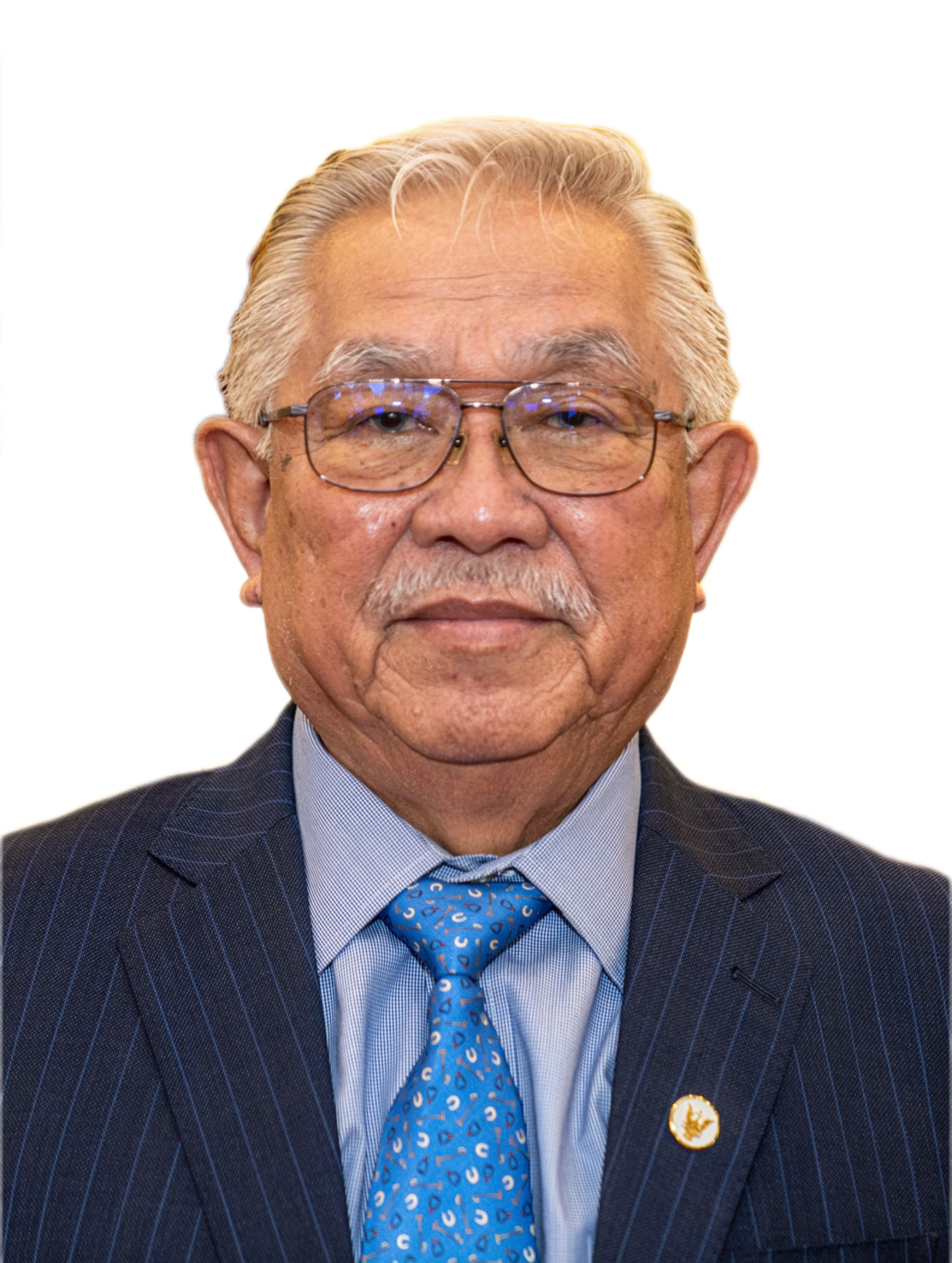
John Sikie Tayai, President of the Sarawak Peoples' Party (PRS).

Logo	Name		Ideology	Leader(s)	Total membership (2026)	Seats contested	2022 result		Sarawak seats only	Sarawak Legislature Seats
Logo	Name		Ideology	Leader(s)	Total membership (2026)	Seats contested	Votes (%)	Seats	Composition	Sarawak Legislature Seats
	PBB	United Bumiputera Heritage Party; Parti Pesaka Bumiputera Bersatu	Sarawak nationalism	Abang Abdul Rahman Zohari Abang Openg	399,782	14	2.22%	14 / 222	14 / 23	47 / 82
	PDP	Progressive Democratic Party; Parti Demokratik Progresif	Regionalism	Tiong King Sing	298,840	4	0.54%	2 / 222	2 / 23	8 / 82
	SUPP	Sarawak United Peoples' Party; Parti Rakyat Bersatu Sarawak	Sarawakian regionalist Syncretic politics and centrism	Sim Kui Hian	21,893	7	1.08%	2 / 222	2 / 23	13 / 82
	PRS	Sarawak Peoples' Party; Parti Rakyat Sarawak	Sarawak nationalism	John Sikie Tayai	20,736	6	0.44%	5 / 222	5 / 23	11 / 82

=== Former allied parties ===
- United People's Party (UPP) (2018–2019)*
- Parti Sarawak Bersatu (PSB) (2019, 2023–2024)*

*denotes defunct parties

== Leadership ==
=== Chairman ===
No.	Name (Birth–Death)	Portrait	Term of office	
1	Abang Abdul Rahman Zohari Abang Openg (b. 1950)		12 June 2018	Incumbent

== Elected representatives ==
=== Dewan Negara (Senate) ===
==== Senators ====
- His Majesty's appointee:
  - Awang Bemee Awang Ali Basah (PBB)
  - Rita Sarimah Patrick Insol (PRS)
  - Pele Peter Tinggom (PDP)
  - Robert Lau Hui Yew (SUPP)
- Sarawak State Legislative Assembly:
  - Michael Mujah Lihan (PBB)
  - Ahmad Ibrahim (PBB)

=== Dewan Rakyat (House of Representatives) ===
==== Members of Parliament of the 15th Malaysian Parliament ====
Gabungan Parti Sarawak has 23 MPs in the House of Representatives.

State	No.	Parliament Constituency	Member	Party
Sarawak	P193	Santubong	Nancy Shukri	PBB
Sarawak	P194	Petra Jaya	Fadillah Yusof	PBB
Sarawak	P197	Kota Samarahan	Rubiah Wang	PBB
Sarawak	P198	Puncak Borneo	Willie Mongin	PBB
Sarawak	P199	Serian	Richard Riot Jaem	SUPP
Sarawak	P200	Batang Sadong	Rodiyah Sapiee	PBB
Sarawak	P201	Batang Lupar	Mohamad Shafizan Kepli	PBB
Sarawak	P202	Sri Aman	Doris Sophia Brodi	PRS
Sarawak	P203	Lubok Antu	Roy Angau Gingkoi	PRS
Sarawak	P204	Betong	Richard Rapu	PBB
Sarawak	P206	Tanjong Manis	Yusuf Abd. Wahab	PBB
Sarawak	P207	Igan	Ahmad Johnie Zawawi	PBB
Sarawak	P208	Sarikei	Huang Tiong Sii	SUPP
Sarawak	P210	Kanowit	Aaron Ago Dagang	PRS
Sarawak	P213	Mukah	Hanifah Hajar Taib	PBB
Sarawak	P214	Selangau	Edwin Banta	PRS
Sarawak	P215	Kapit	Alexander Nanta Linggi	PBB
Sarawak	P216	Hulu Rajang	Wilson Ugak Kumbong	PRS
Sarawak	P217	Bintulu	Tiong King Sing	PDP
Sarawak	P218	Sibuti	Lukanisman Awang Sauni	PBB
Sarawak	P220	Baram	Anyi Ngau	PDP
Sarawak	P221	Limbang	Hasbi Habibollah	PBB
Sarawak	P222	Lawas	Henry Sum Agong	PBB
Total	Sarawak (23)			

=== Dewan Undangan Negeri (State Legislative Assembly) ===
==== Malaysian State Assembly Representatives ====
Sarawak State Legislative Assembly

79 / 82

State	No.	Parliamentary Constituency	No.	State Constituency	Member	Party
Sarawak	P192	Mas Gading	N01	Opar	Billy Sujang	SUPP
Sarawak	P192	Mas Gading	N02	Tasik Biru	Henry Harry Jinep	PDP
Sarawak	P193	Santubong	N03	Tanjong Datu	Azizul Annuar Adenan	PBB
Sarawak	P193	Santubong	N04	Pantai Damai	Abdul Rahman Junaidi	PBB
Sarawak	P193	Santubong	N05	Demak Laut	Hazland Abang Hipni	PBB
Sarawak	P194	Petra Jaya	N06	Tupong	Fazzrudin Abdul Rahman	PBB
Sarawak	P194	Petra Jaya	N07	Samariang	Sharifah Hasidah Sayeed Aman Ghazali	PBB
Sarawak	P194	Petra Jaya	N08	Satok	Ibrahim Baki	PBB
Sarawak	P196	Stampin	N12	Kota Sentosa	Wilfred Yap Yau Sin	SUPP
Sarawak	P196	Stampin	N13	Batu Kitang	Lo Khere Chiang	SUPP
Sarawak	P196	Stampin	N14	Batu Kawah	Sim Kui Hian	SUPP
Sarawak	P197	Kota Samarahan	N15	Asajaya	Abdul Karim Rahman Hamzah	PBB
Sarawak	P197	Kota Samarahan	N16	Muara Tuang	Idris Buang	PBB
Sarawak	P197	Kota Samarahan	N17	Stakan	Hamzah Brahim	PBB
Sarawak	P198	Puncak Borneo	N18	Serembu	Miro Simuh	PBB
Sarawak	P198	Puncak Borneo	N19	Mambong	Jerip Susil	PBB
Sarawak	P198	Puncak Borneo	N20	Tarat	Roland Sagah Wee Inn	PBB
Sarawak	P199	Serian	N21	Tebedu	Simon Sinang Bada	PBB
Sarawak	P199	Serian	N22	Kedup	Maclaine Ben @ Martin Ben	PBB
Sarawak	P199	Serian	N23	Bukit Semuja	John Ilus	PBB
Sarawak	P200	Batang Sadong	N24	Sadong Jaya	Aidel Lariwoo	PBB
Sarawak	P200	Batang Sadong	N25	Simunjan	Awla Dris	PBB
Sarawak	P200	Batang Sadong	N26	Gedong	Abang Abdul Rahman Zohari Abang Openg	PBB
Sarawak	P201	Batang Lupar	N27	Sebuyau	Julaihi Narawi	PBB
Sarawak	P201	Batang Lupar	N28	Lingga	Dayang Noorazah Awang Sohor	PBB
Sarawak	P201	Batang Lupar	N29	Beting Maro	Razaili Gapor	PBB
Sarawak	P202	Sri Aman	N30	Balai Ringin	Snowdan Lawan	PRS
Sarawak	P202	Sri Aman	N31	Bukit Begunan	Mong Dagang	PRS
Sarawak	P202	Sri Aman	N32	Simanggang	Francis Harden Hollis	SUPP
Sarawak	P203	Lubok Antu	N33	Engkilili	Johnical Rayong Ngipa	PDP
Sarawak	P203	Lubok Antu	N34	Batang Ai	Malcom Mussen Lamoh	PRS
Sarawak	P204	Betong	N35	Saribas	Ricky @ Mohamad Razi bin Sitam	PBB
Sarawak	P204	Betong	N36	Layar	Gerald Rentap Jabu	PBB
Sarawak	P204	Betong	N37	Bukit Saban	Douglas Uggah Embas	PBB
Sarawak	P205	Saratok	N38	Kalaka	Mohamad Duri	PBB
Sarawak	P205	Saratok	N39	Krian	Friday Belik	PDP
Sarawak	P205	Saratok	N40	Kabong	Mohd Chee Kadir	PBB
Sarawak	P206	Tanjong Manis	N41	Kuala Rajang	Talif @ Len Salleh	PBB
Sarawak	P206	Tanjong Manis	N42	Semop	Abdullah Saidol	PBB
Sarawak	P207	Igan	N43	Daro	Safiee Ahmad	PBB
Sarawak	P207	Igan	N44	Jemoreng	Juanda Jaya	PBB
Sarawak	P208	Sarikei	N45	Repok	Huang Tiong Sii	SUPP
Sarawak	P208	Sarikei	N46	Meradong	Ding Kuong Hiing	SUPP
Sarawak	P209	Julau	N47	Pakan	William Mawan Ikom	PBB
Sarawak	P209	Julau	N48	Meluan	Rolland Duat Jubin	PDP
Sarawak	P210	Kanowit	N49	Ngemah	Anyi Jana	PRS
Sarawak	P210	Kanowit	N50	Machan	Allan Siden Gramong	PBB
Sarawak	P211	Lanang	N51	Bukit Assek	Chieng Jin Ek	SUPP
Sarawak	P211	Lanang	N52	Dudong	Tiong King Sing	PDP
Sarawak	P212	Sibu	N53	Bawang Assan	Wong Soon Koh	PDP
Sarawak	P212	Sibu	N54	Pelawan	Michael Tiang Ming Tee	SUPP
Sarawak	P212	Sibu	N55	Nangka	Annuar Rapaee	PBB
Sarawak	P213	Mukah	N56	Dalat	Fatimah Abdullah	PBB
Sarawak	P213	Mukah	N57	Tellian	Royston Valentine	PBB
Sarawak	P213	Mukah	N58	Balingian	Abdul Yakub Arbi	PBB
Sarawak	P214	Selangau	N59	Tamin	Christopher Gira Sambang	PRS
Sarawak	P214	Selangau	N60	Kakus	John Sikie Tayai	PRS
Sarawak	P215	Kapit	N61	Pelagus	Wilson Nyabong Ijang	PRS
Sarawak	P215	Kapit	N62	Katibas	Lidam Assan	PBB
Sarawak	P215	Kapit	N63	Bukit Goram	Jefferson Jamit Unyat	PBB
Sarawak	P216	Hulu Rajang	N64	Baleh	Nicholas Kudi Jantai Masing	PRS
Sarawak	P216	Hulu Rajang	N65	Belaga	Liwan Lagang	PRS
Sarawak	P216	Hulu Rajang	N66	Murum	Kennedy Chukpai Ugon	PRS
Sarawak	P217	Bintulu	N67	Jepak	Iskandar Turkee	PBB
Sarawak	P217	Bintulu	N68	Tanjong Batu	Johnny Pang Leong Ming	SUPP
Sarawak	P217	Bintulu	N69	Kemena	Stephen Rundi Utom	PBB
Sarawak	P217	Bintulu	N70	Samalaju	Majang Renggi	PRS
Sarawak	P218	Sibuti	N71	Bekenu	Rosey Yunus	PBB
Sarawak	P218	Sibuti	N72	Lambir	Ripin Lamat	PBB
Sarawak	P219	Miri	N73	Piasau	Sebastian Ting Chiew Yew	SUPP
Sarawak	P219	Miri	N74	Pujut	Adam Yii Siew Sang	SUPP
Sarawak	P219	Miri	N75	Senadin	Lee Kim Shin	SUPP
Sarawak	P220	Baram	N76	Marudi	Penguang Manggil	PDP
Sarawak	P220	Baram	N77	Telang Usan	Dennis Ngau	PBB
Sarawak	P220	Baram	N78	Mulu	Gerawat Gala	PBB
Sarawak	P221	Limbang	N79	Bukit Kota	Abdul Rahman Ismail	PBB
Sarawak	P221	Limbang	N80	Batu Danau	Paulus Palu Gumbang	PBB
Sarawak	P222	Lawas	N81	Ba'kelalan	Baru Bian	PDP
Sarawak	P222	Lawas	N82	Bukit Sari	Awang Tengah Ali Hasan	PBB
Total	Sarawak (79)					

== Government offices ==
=== Governors ===
State	Leader type	Member	Party
Sarawak	Yang Di-Pertua Negeri	Tun Dr. Wan Junaidi Tuanku Jaafar	PBB

=== State governments ===
- Sarawak (2018–present)

Note: bold as Premier/Chief Minister, italic as junior partner

State	Leader type	Member	Party	State Constituency
Sarawak	Premier	Abang Abdul Rahman Zohari Abang Openg	PBB	Gedong

State	Leader type	Member	Party	State Constituency
Sarawak	Deputy Premier I	Douglas Uggah Embas	PBB	Bukit Saban
Sarawak	Deputy Premier II	Awang Tengah Ali Hasan	PBB	Bukit Sari
Sarawak	Deputy Premier III	Sim Kui Hian	SUPP	Batu Kawah

=== Ministerial posts ===
Portfolio	Office Bearer	Party	Constituency
Deputy Prime Minister; Minister of Energy Transition and Water Transformation	Dato' Amar Haji Fadillah Yusof MP	PBB	Petra Jaya
Minister of Works	Dato Sri Alexander Nanta Linggi MP	PBB	Kapit
Minister of Women, Family and Community Development	Dato' Sri Hajah Nancy Shukri MP	PBB	Santubong
Minister of Tourism, Arts and Culture	Dato Sri Tiong King Sing MP MLA	PDP	Bintulu
Minister of National Unity	Dato Sri Aaron Ago Dagang MP	PRS	Kanowit

Portfolio	Office Bearer	Party	Constituency
Deputy Minister of Rural and Regional Development	Datuk Rubiah Wang MP	PBB	Kota Samarahan
Deputy Minister of Transport	Datuk Hasbi Habibollah MP	PBB	Limbang
Deputy Minister of Health	Dato Hanifah Hajar Taib MP	PBB	Mukah
Deputy Minister of Plantation and Commodities	Dato' Sri Huang Tiong Sii MP MLA	SUPP	Sarikei
Deputy Minister of Foreign Affairs	Dato Lukanisman Awang Sauni MP	PBB	Sibuti
Deputy Minister of Digital	Datuk Wilson Ugak Kumbong MP	PRS	Hulu Rajang

=== Legislative leadership ===
Portfolio	Office Bearer	Party	Constituency
President of the Dewan Negara	Senator Dato' Awang Bemee Awang Ali Basah	PBB	At-large

State	Leader type	Member	Party	State Constituency
Sarawak	Speaker	Mohamad Asfia Awang Nassar	PBB	Non-MLA
Sarawak	Deputy Speaker	Idris Buang	PBB	Muara Tuang

== Election results ==
=== General election results ===
Election	Total seats won	Seats contested	Total votes	Outcome of election	Election leader
2022	23 / 31 in sarawak	31	662,601	▲4 seats; Governing coalition (Gabungan Parti Sarawak)	Abang Abdul Rahman Zohari Abang Openg

=== State election results ===
Sarawak State Legislative Assembly
Election	Votes		Seats			Position	Status
Election	Count	%	Result	Won / contested	+/–	Position	Status
2021	457,347	61.3	76 / 82	76 / 82	▲76	1st	GPS (Note: GPS–PSB (2023–2024))
