= Baleh (state constituency) =

Political constituency in Malaysia

Baleh (N64)
Sarawak constituency

State constituency
- Legislature: Sarawak State Legislative Assembly
MLA
Vacant
- Constituency created: 1968
- First contested: 1969
- Last contested: 2026

Baleh is a state constituency in Sarawak, Malaysia, that has been represented in the Sarawak State Legislative Assembly since 1969.

The state constituency was created in the 1968 redistribution and is mandated to return a single member to the Sarawak State Legislative Assembly under the first past the post voting system.

== Demographics ==
Ethnic breakdown of Baleh's electorate as of 2022
1. Sarawak bumiputera (98.1%)
2. Chinese (0.70%)
3. Malay-Muslim bumiputera (0.40%)
4. Other ethnicities (0.80%)

== History ==
As of 2020, Baleh has a population of 9,384 people.

=== Polling districts ===
According to the gazette issued on 31 October 2022, the Baleh constituency has a total of 5 polling districts.

State constituency	Polling District	Code	Location
Baleh (N64)	Gaat	216/64/01	RH Lawan Ng.Ramong; RH Mengga Ng. Sepulay Gaat; SK Ng Balang; RH Nading Ng. Senetang; RH Sagen Sg.Gaat; RH Melintang Ng. Sebiru Sg. Gaat
Baleh (N64)	Mujong	216/64/02	RH Jos Sg.Mujong; RG Sengiang Sg. Mujong; SK Sg. Bebangan; RH Narok Sg . Bebangan; RH Umbar Sg. Tiau; RH James Saka; RH Sengiang Anak Usat, Wong Pantu; RH Peter Rantau Bidai; RH Gindal Pulau Sibau; RH Gawan Ng Aman; SK Mujong Tengah; SK Lubok Baya; SK Ng. Oyan; RH Bangkong Ng Sebola; RH Asun Anak Unggang Sg. Mujong; RH Mungko, Rantau Lelangai; SK Oyan Tengah; RH Unting Ng. Sekeroh
Baleh (N64)	Melinau	216/64/03	SK Sg. Tunoh; RH Killau Sg Melinau; RH Barang Sg pabg Melinau; RH Anding Sg. Melinau; RH Jala Sg. Melinau Kapit; RH Kalat Anak Manjah Sg. Majau; SK Lubok Mawang; RH Mansai Sg. Majau; RH Lugat Ng. Majau; RH Pioh Sg. Manjau; RH Berauh Ng Sebelanda, Sg Paku; RH Inguh Miut Sg. Paku; RH Jamba Sg. Paku; RH Jainting Ng. Sepinang; RH Nisson Sg. Paku
Baleh (N64)	Baleh	216/64/04	RH Kachin Sg. Tapang; RH Sait Ng. Puro Gaat; RH Nyamok Sg.Gaat; SK Lepong Gaat; RH Tajai Ng. Semirah Gaat; RH John Katil Kerangan Ara; RH Bidok Ng Sebetong; RH Gon, Ng Serian Baleh; RH Wong Ensong Ng. Sepata; RH Lamau Anak Jenggut, Telok Buing; RH Pinin Anak Tunjang Nanga Usun Baleh; RH Wong Telok Buing; RH Gare Anak Timbang Sg. Kain; RH Engsong Sg. Kain; SK Ng. Kain
Baleh (N64)	Merirai	216/64/05	RH Bigau Ujan Sg. Entuloh; RH Jack Sg. Entuloh; RH Richard (Unyat) Sg. Merirai; RH Goyang Apat Sg. Merirai; RH Bangau Undie Kerangan Laih; RH Jantai Anak Siba Batang Baleh; RH Bully Kerangan Besai Baleh; RII Sebuang Ng. Merama Baleh; Tadika KEMAS, Antawau; RH Tajai Sanggau Ng. Sebiro Baleh; SK Ng Sempili; RH Samon Anak Chepau; RH Itu Sg. Pulang Baleh; RH Bansa Anak Langga Sepulau Baleh; RH Sana Anak Rumpang Ng. Gaat

=== Representation history ===
Members of the Legislative Assembly for Baleh
Assembly	No	Years	Member	Party
Constituency created
8th	N39	1970-1974	Kenneth Kenyan Temenggong Koh	PESAKA
9th	N39	1974-1979	Peter Gani Kiai	SNAP
10th	N39	1979-1983	Peter Gani Kiai	BN (SNAP)
11th	N39	1983-1987	James Jemut Masing	PBDS
12th	N39	1987–1991	James Jemut Masing	PBDS
13th	N47	1991–1996	James Jemut Masing	PBDS
14th	N50	1996-2001	James Jemut Masing	BN (PBDS)
15th	N50	2001–2004	James Jemut Masing	BN (PBDS)
15th	N50	2004-2006	James Jemut Masing	BN (PRS)
16th	N56	2006–2011	James Jemut Masing	BN (PRS)
17th	N56	2011–2016	James Jemut Masing	BN (PRS)
18th	N64	2016–2018	James Jemut Masing	BN (PRS)
18th	N64	2018- 2021	James Jemut Masing	GPS (PRS)
18th	N64	2021	Vacant (Note: Vacant from 31 October 2021 until the 2021 state election due to the incumbent died in office.)	
19th	N64	2021–2026	Nicholas Kudi Jantai Masing	GPS (PRS)

== Election results ==
Sarawak state election, 2026
Party	Candidate	Votes	%	∆%
GPS				▲
PH				▲
Total valid votes				
Total rejected ballots				
Unreturned ballots				
Turnout				
Registered electors				
Majority				

Sarawak state election, 2021
Party	Candidate	Votes	%	∆%
GPS	Nicholas Kudi Jantai Masing	3,541	61.85	▲61.85
PSB	Koh Kumbong	1,631	28.51	▲28.51
DAP	Kenneth Lagong	470	8.21	▲8.21
PBK	Sukarno @ Iskandar Abdullah	82	1.43	▲1.43
Total valid votes		5,725	100.00	
Total rejected ballots		90		
Unreturned ballots		17		
Turnout		5,832	57.53	▼2.94
Registered electors		10,137		
Majority		1,909	33.35	▼49.99
GPS gain from BN		Swing		?
Source(s) https://lom.agc.gov.my/ilims/upload/portal/akta/outputp/1718688/PUB687.pdf

Sarawak state election, 2016
Party	Candidate	Votes	%	∆%
BN	James Jemut Masing	5,272	91.67	▲12.08
DAP	Agop Linsong	479	8.33	▲8.33
Total valid votes		5,751	100.00	
Total rejected ballots		55		
Unreturned ballots		14		
Turnout		5,820	60.47	▲1.25
Registered electors		9,624		
Majority		4,793	83.34	▲24.16
BN hold		Swing		
Source(s) "Federal Government Gazette - Notice of Contested Election, State Legislative Assembly of the State of Sarawak [P.U. (B) 190/2016]" (PDF). Attorney General's Chambers of Malaysia. 25 April 2016. Archived from the original (PDF) on 12 June 2017. "Senarai Calon yang Disahkan Layak Bertanding Pilihan Raya Dewan Undangan Negeri ke-11". Election Commission of Malaysia. 25 April 2016. Archived from the original on 25 April 2016.

Sarawak state election, 2011
Party	Candidate	Votes	%	∆%
BN	James Jemut Masing	5,242	79.59	▼11.40
PKR	Bendindang Manjah	1,344	20.41	▲20.41
Total valid votes		6,586	100.00	
Total rejected ballots		98		
Unreturned ballots		0		
Turnout		6,684	59.22	▼1.98
Registered electors		11,287		
Majority		3,898	59.19	▼22.82
BN hold		Swing		
Source(s) "Federal Government Gazette - Results of Contested Election and Statements of the Poll after the Official Addition of Votes Sarawak [P.U. (B) 245/2011]" (PDF). Attorney General's Chambers of Malaysia. 29 April 2011.

Sarawak state election, 2006
Party	Candidate	Votes	%	∆%
BN	James Jemut Masing	5,330	90.99	▼3.30
SNAP	Lucius Jimbon	528	9.01	▲9.01
Total valid votes		5,858	100.00	
Total rejected ballots		95		
Unreturned ballots		3		
Turnout		5,956	61.20	▼8.82
Registered electors		9,731		
Majority		4,802	82.00	▼6.59
BN hold		Swing		

Sarawak state election, 2001
Party	Candidate	Votes	%	∆%
BN	James Jemut Masing	6,378	94.29	▲6.63
Independent	Stephen Nyamok Medan	386	5.71	▲5.71
Total valid votes		6,764	100.00	
Total rejected ballots		96		
Unreturned ballots		1		
Turnout		6,861	70.02	▲4.25
Registered electors		9,798		
Majority		5,992	88.59	▲13.27
BN hold		Swing		

Sarawak state election, 1996
Party	Candidate	Votes	%	∆%
BN	James Jemut Masing	5,411	87.66	▲20.51
Independent	John Pungga	762	12.34	▲12.34
Total valid votes		6,173	100.00	
Total rejected ballots		154		
Unreturned ballots		7		
Turnout		6,334	65.77	▼6.14
Registered electors		9,631		
Majority		4,649	75.31	▲38.00
BN gain from PBDS		Swing		?

Sarawak state election, 1991
Party	Candidate	Votes	%	∆%
PBDS	James Jemut Masing	4,183	67.15	▲7.97
BN	Simon Temenggong Sibat	1,858	29.83	▼10.99
Independent	Ngalambong Limbing	188	3.02	▲3.02
Total valid votes		6,229	100.00	
Total rejected ballots		77		
Unreturned ballots		0		
Turnout		6,306	71.91	▲1.12
Registered electors		8,769		
Majority		2,325	37.33	▲18.97
PBDS hold		Swing		

Sarawak state election, 1987
Party	Candidate	Votes	%	∆%
PBDS	James Jemut Masing	3,516	59.18	▲11.20
BN	Joseph Jinggut	2,425	40.82	▲11.75
Total valid votes		5,941	100.00	
Total rejected ballots		98		
Unreturned ballots		0		
Turnout		6,039	70.79	▼1.07
Registered electors		8,531		
Majority		1,091	18.36	▲0.54
PBDS hold		Swing		

Sarawak state election, 1983
Party	Candidate	Votes	%	∆%
PBDS	James Jemut Masing	2,717	47.98	▲47.98
BN	Peter Gani Kiai	1,646	29.07	▼48.09
Independent	Joseph Jinggut	1,300	22.95	▲22.95
Total valid votes		5,663	100.00	
Total rejected ballots		124		
Unreturned ballots		0		
Turnout		5,787	71.86	▲9.76
Registered electors		8,053		
Majority		1,071	18.91	▼40.36
PBDS gain from BN		Swing		?

Sarawak state election, 1979
Party	Candidate	Votes	%	∆%
BN	Peter Gani Kiai	3,723	77.16	▲21.16
Independent	Nyewak Sibat	864	17.91	▲17.91
Parti Umat Sarawak	Tuan Antau	238	4.93	▲4.93
Total valid votes		4,825	100.00	
Total rejected ballots		172		
Unreturned ballots		0		
Turnout		4,997	62.10	▼3.20
Registered electors		8,054		
Majority		2,859	59.25	▲47.26
BN gain from SNAP		Swing		?

Sarawak state election, 1974
Party	Candidate	Votes	%	∆%
SNAP	Peter Gani Kiai	2,344	56.00	▲12.10
BN	Kenneth Kanyan Temenggong Koh	1,842	44.00	▼12.10
Total valid votes		4,186	100.00	
Total rejected ballots		479		
Unreturned ballots		0		
Turnout		4,665	65.30	▲5.23
Registered electors		7,143		
Majority		502	11.99	
SNAP gain from PESAKA		Swing		?

Sarawak state election, 1969
Party	Candidate	Votes	%
PESAKA	Kenneth Kenyan Temenggong Koh	1,953	56.10
SNAP	Wesley Ajang Nabau	1,528	43.90
Total valid votes		3,481	100.00
Total rejected ballots		371	
Unreturned ballots		0	
Turnout		3,852	60.07
Registered electors		6,412	
Majority		425	12.21
This was a new constituency created.
