= Lubok Antu (federal constituency) =

Federal constituency of Sarawak, Malaysia

Lubok Antu (P203)
Sarawak constituency

Federal constituency
- Legislature: Dewan Rakyat
- MP: Roy Angau Gingkoi; GPS
- Constituency created: 1968
- First contested: 1969
- Last contested: 2022

Demographics
- Population (2020): 26,780
- Electors (2022): 28,995
- Area (km²): 3,294
- Pop. density (per km²): 8.1

Lubok Antu is a federal constituency in Sri Aman Division (Lubok Antu District and Sri Aman District) and Betong Division (Betong District), Sarawak, Malaysia, that has been represented in the Dewan Rakyat since 1971.

The federal constituency was created in the 1968 redistribution and is mandated to return a single member to the Dewan Rakyat under the first past the post voting system.

== Demographics ==
https://ge15.orientaldaily.com.my/seats/sarawak/p

Ethnic breakdown of Lubok Antu's electorate as of 2022
1. Sarawak bumiputera (88.6%)
2. Chinese (7.80%)
3. Malay-Muslim bumiputera (3.00%)
4. Other ethnicities (0.60%)

As of 2020, Lubok Antu has a population of 26,780 people.

Age breakdown of Lubok Antu's electorate as of 2022
1. 18–20 (5.81%)
2. 21–29 (17.6%)
3. 30–39 (19.4%)
4. 40–49 (17.2%)
5. 50–59 (17.8%)
6. 60–69 (12.5%)
7. 70–79 (6.73%)
8. 80–89 (2.18%)
9. above 90 (0.86%)
Gender breakdown of Lubok Antu's electorate as of 2022
1. Male (50.5%)
2. Female (49.5%)

== History ==
=== Polling districts ===
According to the gazette issued on 31 October 2022, the Lubok Antu constituency has a total of 48 polling districts.

State constituency	Polling Districts	Code	Location
Engkilili（N33）	Skrang	203/33/01	SK Lidong
Engkilili（N33）	Enteban	203/33/02	SK Ng. Enteban
Engkilili（N33）	Entalau	203/33/03	SK Entalau
Engkilili（N33）	Semanju	203/33/04	SK San Semanju
Engkilili（N33）	Kasenduh	203/33/05	SK Ijok
Engkilili（N33）	Engkilili	203/33/06	SJK (C) Chung Hua Engkilili
Engkilili（N33）	Tabut	203/33/07	SK Tabut
Engkilili（N33）	Aur	203/33/08	SK Isu / Bangat
Engkilili（N33）	Pentik	203/33/09	SK Skik Skrang
Engkilili（N33）	Jukat	203/33/10	SK Ng. Menjuau; RH Gait Keranggas
Engkilili（N33）	Selandong	203/33/11	RH Abon Panchor
Engkilili（N33）	Akup	203/33/12	RH Velly Sg. Pinang
Engkilili（N33）	Marutih	203/33/13	SK Ng. Tebat
Engkilili（N33）	Mujan	203/33/14	RH Nudong Murat
Engkilili（N33）	Kujoh	203/33/15	RH Mulok Kujoh
Engkilili（N33）	SPLU	203/33/16	SK Riban
Engkilili（N33）	Meridun	203/33/17	Tadika Kemas Merindun
Engkilili（N33）	Tawai	203/33/18	RH Henry Kudol
Engkilili（N33）	Basi	203/33/19	SK Basi
Engkilili（N33）	Geligau	203/33/20	SK Empelam
Engkilili（N33）	Sedarat	203/33/21	SK Stengin / Sedarat
Engkilili（N33）	Marop	203/33/22	SMK Engkilili
Engkilili（N33）	Merio	203/33/23	Balai Raya Ng. Merio
Engkilili（N33）	Merbong	203/33/24	SK Engkilili No. 1
Batang Ai (N34)	Sebangki	203/34/01	SK Sebangki
Batang Ai (N34)	Lubok Antu	203/34/02	SMK Lubok Antu
Batang Ai (N34)	Sekarok	203/34/03	SK Sekarok
Batang Ai (N34)	Kesit	203/34/04	SK Ng. Kesit; RH Limpeng Lepong Mawang Kesit
Batang Ai (N34)	Engkari	203/34/05	SK Ulu Engkari
Batang Ai (N34)	Delok	203/34/06	SK Ng. Delok Lubok Antu
Batang Ai (N34)	Kaong	203/34/07	Tadika KEMAS Kaong Ulu; Pusat Sumber Nyemungan Simpang
Batang Ai (N34)	Empit	203/34/08	SK Melaban Empit
Batang Ai (N34)	Kumpang	203/34/09	SK Ng. Aup
Batang Ai (N34)	Klampu	203/34/10	RH Renggie
Batang Ai (N34)	Sayat	203/34/11	SK Ng. Kumpang
Batang Ai (N34)	Kutai	203/34/12	SK Lubok Antu
Batang Ai (N34)	Mepi	203/34/13	SK Batang Ai
Batang Ai (N34)	Jela	203/34/14	Tadika KEMAS Ng. Jela; Ng Telaus Sps
Batang Ai (N34)	Sempang	203/34/15	Tadika KEMAS Sempang
Batang Ai (N34)	Bertik	203/34/16	Dewan Seberguna SALCRA SPS Batang Ai
Batang Ai (N34)	Krangan Mong	203/34/17	Tadika Kemas Krangan Mong
Batang Ai (N34)	Ensawang	203/34/18	Dewan Seberguna SALCRA Skim Batu Kaya
Batang Ai (N34)	Kachong	203/34/19	SK Ng. Menyebat
Batang Ai (N34)	Patoh	203/34/20	RH Jeli; RH Bakar
Batang Ai (N34)	Bilarap	203/34/21	SK Ulu Lemanak Ng. Uyau
Batang Ai (N34)	Sepata	203/34/22	SK Ng. Tibu
Batang Ai (N34)	Gugu	203/34/23	RH Intang Mengiling
Batang Ai (N34)	Nenyang	203/34/24	SESCO Township Hall

=== Representation history ===
Members of Parliament for Lubok Antu
Parliament	No	Years	Member	Party	Vote Share
Constituency created
		1969–1971	Parliament was suspended		
3rd	P129	1971–1974	Jonathan Narwin Jinggong	SNAP	1,867; 30.46%
4th	P139	1974–1978	Jonathan Narwin Jinggong	SNAP	3,266; 53.17%
5th	P139	1978–1982	Jonathan Narwin Jinggong	BN (SNAP)	2,789; 39.33%
6th	P139	1982–1986	Andrew Janggi Muyang	BN (SNAP)	Uncontested
7th	P162	1986–1987	Andrew Janggi Muyang	BN (PBDS)	5,195; 55.53%
7th	P162	1987–1990	Jawah Gerang	BN (PBDS)	5,297; 69.21%
8th	P164	1990–1995	Jawah Gerang	BN (PBDS)	Uncontested
9th	P176	1995–1999	Jawah Gerang	BN (PBDS)	Uncontested
10th	P177	1999–2004	Jawah Gerang	BN (PRS)	8,759; 80.68%
11th	P203	2004–2008	Jawah Gerang	BN (PRS)	6,962; 58.56%
12th	P203	2008–2013	William Nyallau Badak	BN (PRS)	6,769; 56.75%
13th	P203	2013–2018	William Nyallau Badak	BN (PRS)	8,278; 55.21%
13th	P203	2018	William Nyallau Badak	Independent	8,278; 55.21%
14th	P203	2018	Jugah Muyang	Independent	5,834; 40.09%
14th	P203	2018–2020	Jugah Muyang	PH (PKR)	5,834; 40.09%
14th	P203	2020–2022	Jugah Muyang	Independent	5,834; 40.09%
15th	P203	2022–present	Roy Angau Gingkoi	GPS (PRS)	6,644; 34.44%

=== State constituency ===
Parliamentary constituency	State constituency					
Parliamentary constituency	1969–1978	1978–1990	1990–1999	1999–2008	2008–2016	2016–present
Lubok Antu		Batang Ai				Batang Ai
Lubok Antu					Batang Air	
Lubok Antu		Engkilili				
Lubok Antu	Engkilili-Skrang					
Lubok Antu	Ulu Ai					

=== Historical boundaries ===
State Constituency	Area					
State Constituency	1968	1977	1987	1996	2005	2015
Batang Ai		Batang Ai; Lubok Antu; Sebangki; Sekarok; Sungai Ara				
Engkilili		Engkilili; Entalau; Selandong; Semanju; Skrang				
Engkilili-Skrang	Batang Ai; Lubok Antu; Sebangki; Sekarok; Sungai Ara					
Ulu Ai	Engkilili; Entalau; Selandong; Semanju; Skrang					

=== Current state assembly members ===
No.	Constituency	Member	Coalition (Party)
N33	Engkilili	Johnical Rayong Ngipa	GPS (PDP)
N34	Batang Ai	Malcom Mussen Lamoh	GPS (PBB)

=== Local governments & postcodes ===
No.	State Constituency	Local Government	Postcode
N33	Engklili	Lubok Antu District Council; Betong District Council (Enteban and Kampung Murap areas)	95700 Betong; 95800 Engkilili; 95900 Lubok Antu
N34	Batang Ai	Lubok Antu District Council	95700 Betong; 95800 Engkilili; 95900 Lubok Antu

== Election results ==
Malaysian general election, 2022
Party	Candidate	Votes	%	∆%
GPS	Roy Angau Gingkoi	6,644	34.44	▲34.44
PSB	Johnical Rayong Ngipa	6,544	33.92	▲33.92
PN	Jugah Muyang	5,360	27.78	▲27.78
PH	Langga Lias	746	3.87	▲3.87
Total valid votes		19,294	100.00	
Total rejected ballots		200		
Unreturned ballots		43		
Turnout		19,537	66.54	▼4.54
Registered electors		28,995		
Majority		100	0.50	▼6.76
GPS gain from Independent		Swing		?
Source(s) https://lom.agc.gov.my/ilims/upload/portal/akta/outputp/1753265/PARLIMEN%20SARAWAK%20(PUB%20620).pdf

Malaysian general election, 2018
Party	Candidate	Votes	%	∆%
Independent	Jugah Muyang	5,834	40.09	▲40.09
BN	Robert Pasang Alam	4,775	32.82	▼19.39
PKR	Nicholas Bawin Anggat	3,942	27.09	▲10.22
Total valid votes		14,551	100.00	
Total rejected ballots		199		
Unreturned ballots		35		
Turnout		14,785	71.08	▼7.49
Registered electors		20,801		
Majority		1,059	7.28	▼20.01
Independent gain from BN		Swing		?
Source(s) "His Majesty's Government Gazette – Notice of Contested Election, Parliament for the State of Sarawak [P.U. (B) 247/2018]" (PDF). Attorney General's Chambers of Malaysia. 3 May 2018. "Federal Government Gazette – Results of Contested Election and Statements of the Poll after the Official Addition of Votes, Parliamentary Constituencies for the State of Sarawak [P.U. (B) 321/2018]" (PDF). Attorney General's Chambers of Malaysia. 28 May 2018.

Malaysian general election, 2013
Party	Candidate	Votes	%	∆%
BN	William @ Nyallau Badak	8,278	55.21	▼1.54
Sarawak Workers Party	Larry Soon @ Larry Sng Wei Shien	4,187	27.92	▲27.92
PKR	Nicholas Bawin Anggat	2,530	16.87	▲16.87
Total valid votes		14,995	100.00	
Total rejected ballots		143		
Unreturned ballots		28		
Turnout		15,166	78.57	▲8.54
Registered electors		19,303		
Majority		4,091	27.29	▲13.79
BN hold		Swing		
Source(s) "Federal Government Gazette – Notice of Contested Election, Parliament for the State of Sarawak [P.U. (B) 184/2013]" (PDF). Attorney General's Chambers of Malaysia. 26 April 2013. "Federal Government Gazette – Results of Contested Election and Statements of the Poll after the Official Addition of Votes, Parliamentary Constituencies for the State of Sarawak [P.U. (B) 225/2013]" (PDF). Attorney General's Chambers of Malaysia. 22 May 2013.

Malaysian general election, 2008
Party	Candidate	Votes	%	∆%
BN	William @ Nyalau Badak	6,769	56.75	▼1.81
Independent	Nicholas Bawin Anggat	5,159	43.25	▲43.25
Total valid votes		11,928	100.00	
Total rejected ballots		99		
Unreturned ballots		11		
Turnout		12,038	70.03	▲1.24
Registered electors		17,190		
Majority		1,610	13.50	▼3.62
BN hold		Swing		

Malaysian general election, 2004
Party	Candidate	Votes	%	∆%
BN	Jawah Gerang	6,962	58.56	▼22.12
Independent	William @ Nyalau Badak	4,927	41.44	▲41.44
Total valid votes		11,889	100.00	
Total rejected ballots		232		
Unreturned ballots		18		
Turnout		12,139	68.79	▲1.18
Registered electors		17,647		
Majority		2,035	17.12	▼44.24
BN hold		Swing		

Malaysian general election, 1999
Party	Candidate	Votes	%	∆%
BN	Jawah Gerang	8,759	80.68	▲80.68
PKR	David Jemut	2,097	19.32	▲19.32
Total valid votes		10,856	100.00	
Total rejected ballots		223		
Unreturned ballots		13		
Turnout		11,092	67.61	
Registered electors		16,405		
Majority		6,662	61.36	
BN hold		Swing		

Malaysian general election, 1995
Party	Candidate	Votes	%	∆%
On the nomination day, Jawah Gerang won uncontested.
BN	Jawah Gerang			
Total valid votes			100.00	
Total rejected ballots				
Unreturned ballots				
Turnout				
Registered electors		16,108		
Majority				
BN hold		Swing		

Elector count is from Tindak Malaysia's GitHub

Malaysian general election, 1990
Party	Candidate	Votes	%	∆%
On the nomination day, Jawah Gerang won uncontested.
BN	Jawah Gerang			
Total valid votes			100.00	
Total rejected ballots				
Unreturned ballots				
Turnout				
Registered electors		14,845		
Majority				
BN hold		Swing		

Malaysian general by-election, 4 April 1987 Upon the death of incumbent, Andrew Janggi Muyang
Party	Candidate	Votes	%	∆%
BN	Jawah Gerang	5,297	69.21	▲13.68
Independent	Augustine Sating Jemut	2,356	30.79	▲30.79
Total valid votes		7,653	100.00	
Total rejected ballots		133		
Unreturned ballots		0		
Turnout		7,786	58.17	▼13.09
Registered electors		13,386		
Majority		2,941	38.42	▲27.36
BN hold		Swing		

Malaysian general election, 1986
Party	Candidate	Votes	%	∆%
BN	Andrew Janggi Muyang	5,195	55.53	▲55.53
Independent	Dawi Drahman	4,161	44.47	▲44.47
Total valid votes		9,356	100.00	
Total rejected ballots		183		
Unreturned ballots		0		
Turnout		9,539	71.26	
Registered electors		13,386		
Majority		1,034	11.06	
BN hold		Swing		

Malaysian general election, 1982
Party	Candidate	Votes	%	∆%
On the nomination day, Andrew Janggi Muyang won uncontested.
BN	Andrew Janggi Muyang			
Total valid votes			100.00	
Total rejected ballots				
Unreturned ballots				
Turnout				
Registered electors		11,739		
Majority				
BN hold		Swing		

Malaysian general election, 1978
Party	Candidate	Votes	%	∆%
BN	Jonathan Narwin Jinggong	2,789	39.93	▼6.90
Independent	Kua Siang How	1,636	23.42	▲23.42
Independent	Ah Choon	1,405	20.11	▲20.11
Independent	Simon Dembab Maja	1,155	16.54	▲16.54
Total valid votes		6,985	100.00	
Total rejected ballots		221		
Unreturned ballots		0		
Turnout		7,206	69.38	▼0.05
Registered electors		10,386		
Majority		1,153	16.51	▲10.17
BN gain from SNAP		Swing		?

Malaysian general election, 1974
Party	Candidate	Votes	%	∆%
SNAP	Jonathan Narwin Jinggong	3,266	53.17	▲22.71
BN	Tutong Ningkan	2,877	46.83	▲46.83
Total valid votes		6,143	100.00	
Total rejected ballots		594		
Unreturned ballots		0		
Turnout		6,737	69.43	▼7.67
Registered electors		9,703		
Majority		389	6.34	▲1.61
SNAP hold		Swing		

Malaysian general election, 1969
Party	Candidate	Votes	%
SNAP	Jonathan Narwin Jinggong	1,867	30.46
PESAKA	Unah Dudong	1,577	25.73
SUPP	Bauk Lang	1,480	24.15
Independent	Budo Ulan	620	10.12
Independent	Belon Ubak	585	9.54
Total valid votes		6,129	100.00
Total rejected ballots		744	
Unreturned ballots		0	
Turnout		6,873	77.10
Registered electors		8,914	
Majority		290	4.73
This was a new constituency created.
