= Mambong =

Mambong may refer to:

- Mambong (federal constituency), represented in the Dewan Rakyat
- Mambong (state constituency), represented in the Sarawak State Legislative Assembly
