= 2009 Batang Air by-election =

Election in Malaysia

← 2006	7 April 2009	2011 →

Batang Air seat in the Sarawak State Legislative Assembly
	BN	PKR
Candidate	Malcom Mussen Lamoh	Jawah Gerang
Party	BN (PRS)	PKR
Alliance		PR
Popular vote	3,907	2,053
Percentage	65.55%	34.45%
Batang Air assemblyman before election
Dublin Unting Ingkot
BN (PRS)
Elected Batang Air assemblyman
Malcom Mussen Lamoh
BN (PRS)

The 2009 Batang Air by-election is a by-election for the Sarawak State Legislative Assembly state seat of Batang Ai, (Note: From 2006 to 2016, the state seat were referred in official SPR records as Batang Air.) Malaysia that were held on 9 April 2009. It was called following the death of the incumbent, Dublin Unting Ingkot on 24 February 2009.

The by election was held on the same day as the 2009 Bukit Selambau by-election and 2009 Bukit Gantang by-election.

== Background ==
Dublin Unting Ingkot, a candidate of Barisan Nasional (BN), were first elected unopposed to the Sarawak state seat of Batang Air at the 2001 Sarawak state election, and defended his seat in 2006 Sarawak state election defeating candidate from Sarawak National Party (SNAP). A vice-president of BN's component party Parti Rakyat Sarawak (PRS), Dublin were appointed the deputy state minister of sports and agriculture after his win in 2006.

On 24 February 2009, Dublin died at Normah Hospital, Kuching after 8 months in a comatose state, when he suffered a stroke attack while being interviewed by Radio Televisyen Malaysia as Sarawak Chef-de-Mission in Sukan Malaysia. His death means that his Batang Air state seat were vacated. This necessitates for a by-election to be held, as the seat were vacated more that 2 years before the expiry of the Sarawak state assembly current term. Election Commission of Malaysia (SPR) announced on 4 March 2009 that the by-election will be held on 7 April 2009, with 29 March 2009 set as the nomination day. This means that this by election will have the same election dan nomination date as Bukit Selambau state seat in Kedah and Bukit Gantang federal seat in Perak, which were announced earlier by SPR on 13 February 2009

== Nomination and campaign ==
After nomination closed, it was confirmed there will be a straight fight between BN and PKR for the Batang Air seat. BN nominated Malcom Mussen Lamoh, a member of PRS. PKR meanwhile nominated Jawah Gerang, member of parliament for Lubok Antu from 1990 to 2008, while he were still in BN as Parti Bansa Dayak Sarawak (PBDS) member until PBDS dissolution in 2004. After he were not selected to defend the Lubok Antu seat in 2008, he exits BN.

== Timeline ==
The key dates are listed below.

Date	Event
	Issue of the Writ of Election
29 March 2009	Nomination Day
29 March - 6 April 2009	Campaigning Period
	Early polling day for postal and overseas voters
7 April 2009	Polling Day

== Results ==
Sarawak state by-election, 7 April 2009: Batang Air Upon the death of incumbent, Dublin Unting Ingkot
Party	Candidate	Votes	%	∆%
BN	Malcom Mussen Lamoh	3,907	65.55	▲8.58
PKR	Jawah Gerang	2,053	34.45	▲34.45
Total valid votes		5,960	100.00	
Total rejected ballots		59		
Unreturned ballots		11		
Turnout		6,030	75.32	
Registered electors		8,006		
Majority		1,854		
BN hold		Swing		?
Source(s) "Pilihan Raya Kecil N.29 Batang Air". Election Commission of Malaysia.

=== Previous result ===
Sarawak state election, 2006: Batang Air
Party	Candidate	Votes	%	∆%
BN	Dublin Unting Ingkot	3,295	56.97	▲56.97
SNAP	Nicholas Bawin Anggat	2,489	43.03	▲43.03
Total valid votes		5,784	100.00	
Total rejected ballots		70		
Unreturned ballots		10		
Turnout		5,864	73.32	
Registered electors		7,997		
Majority		806		
BN hold		Swing		?

== Aftermath ==
The President of the Malaysian Islamic Party (PAS) Abdul Hadi Awang said that the opposition camp has been winning every by-election in Malaysia after the 2008 Malaysian general election but failed in Batang Air because only Dayak people wearing "loincloth" (cawat) are voting for BN while those wearing "neat clothes" are voting for PAS.
