= Puncak Borneo =

Federal constituency of Sarawak, Malaysia

Puncak Borneo (P198)
Sarawak constituency

Federal constituency
- Legislature: Dewan Rakyat
- MP: Willie Mongin; GPS
- Constituency created: 2018
- First contested: 2018
- Last contested: 2022

Demographics
- Population (2020): 80,780
- Electors (2022): 79,969
- Area (km²): 1,328
- Pop. density (per km²): 60.8

Puncak Borneo is a federal constituency in Kuching Division (Bau District and Kuching District) and Serian Division (Tebedu District and Siburan District), Sarawak, Malaysia, that has been represented in the Dewan Rakyat since 2018.

The federal constituency was created in the 2018 redistribution and is mandated to return a single member to the Dewan Rakyat under the first past the post voting system.

== Demographics ==
https://ge15.orientaldaily.com.my/seats/sarawak/p

Ethnic breakdown of Puncak Borneo's electorate as of 2022
1. Sarawak bumiputera (66.9%)
2. Chinese (25.3%)
3. Malay-Muslim bumiputera (6.90%)
4. Other ethnicities (1.00%)

As of 2020, Puncak Borneo has a population of 80,780 people.

Age breakdown of Puncak Borneo's electorate as of 2022
1. 18-20 (6.54%)
2. 21-29 (20.6%)
3. 30-39 (21.2%)
4. 40-49 (17.6%)
5. 50-59 (15.9%)
6. 60-69 (11.1%)
7. 70-79 (5.09%)
8. 80-89 (1.56%)
9. above 90 (0.43%)
Gender breakdown of Puncak Borneo's electorate as of 2022
1. Male (50.8%)
2. Female (49.2%)

== History ==
=== Polling districts ===
According to the gazette issued on 31 October 2022, the Puncak Borneo constituency has a total of 87 polling districts.

State constituency	Polling Districts	Code	Location
Serembu（N18）	Siniawan	198/18/01	SJK (C) Chung Hua Siniawan
Serembu（N18）	Kranji	198/18/02	SJK (C) Chung Hua Keranji
Serembu（N18）	Kopit	198/18/03	Balai Raya Kpg. Kopit
Serembu（N18）	Krokong	198/18/04	Dewan Masyarakat Krokong
Serembu（N18）	Podam	198/18/05	SK Podam
Serembu（N18）	Penijau Baru	198/18/06	Balai Raya Kpg. Peninjau Baru
Serembu（N18）	Merembeh	198/18/07	Balai Raya Merembeh
Serembu（N18）	Kandis	198/18/08	SK Siniawan
Serembu（N18）	Sungai Pinang	198/18/09	SK Sg. Pinang
Serembu（N18）	Paku	198/18/10	SJK (C) Chung Hua Paku
Serembu（N18）	Tanjung Durian	198/18/11	SK Serembu
Serembu（N18）	Seropak	198/18/12	Balai Raya Kpg. Seropak
Serembu（N18）	Seromah	198/18/13	Balai Raya Kpg. Seromah
Serembu（N18）	Segubang	198/18/14	Balai Raya Kpg. Segubang
Serembu（N18）	Sogo	198/18/15	Dewan Serbaguna Kpg. Skio; Balai Raya Kpg. Sogo
Serembu（N18）	Rabak Rotan	198/18/16	Dewan Tringgus Bong
Serembu（N18）	Pangkalan Tebang	198/18/17	Balai Raya Pangkalan Tebang; Balai Raya Ledan Gumbang
Serembu（N18）	Monggak	198/18/18	Balai Raya Bijurey
Serembu（N18）	Blimbin	198/18/19	Balai Raya Kpg. Blimbin
Serembu（N18）	Gumbang	198/18/20	Balai Raya Kpg. Gumbang
Serembu（N18）	Padang Pan	198/18/21	Dewan Serbaguna Kpg. Padang Pan
Serembu（N18）	Puak Krokong	198/18/22	Dewan Serbaguna Kpg. Puak Krokong (Baru)
Mambong (N19)	Mambong	198/19/01	Balai Raya Kpg. Mambong
Mambong (N19)	Siburan	198/19/02	SJK (C) Chung Hua Siburan
Mambong (N19)	Braang	198/19/03	Dewan Serbaguna Kpg. Bara'ang Payang; Balai Raya Kpg Bra'ang Sigandar
Mambong (N19)	Duras	198/19/04	Balai Raya Kpg. Duras
Mambong (N19)	Pulasar	198/19/05	SJK (C) Chung Hua Batu 15
Mambong (N19)	Nyiru	198/19/06	SK St. Gile
Mambong (N19)	Giam	198/19/07	Dewan Serbaguna Kpg. Giam Baru
Mambong (N19)	Sikog	198/19/08	Balai Raya Kpg. Sikog
Mambong (N19)	Staang	198/19/09	Balai Raya Kpg. Staang
Mambong (N19)	Petag	198/19/10	SK Staang Petag
Mambong (N19)	Bayor	198/19/11	Balai Raya Kpg. Bayor
Mambong (N19)	Jambu	198/19/12	SK Kpg. Emperoh Jambu
Mambong (N19)	Semban	198/19/13	Dewan Serbaguna Kpg. Semban Begoh Resettlement Scheme
Mambong (N19)	Tebia	198/19/14	Dewan Serbaguna Kpg. Sait Bengoh Resettlement Scheme
Mambong (N19)	Danu	198/19/15	Balai Raya Kpg. Danu
Mambong (N19)	Temurang	198/19/16	Balai Raya Kpg. Temurang Baru; Balai Raya Kpg. Biya Jaber
Mambong (N19)	Bengoh	198/19/17	Balai Raya Kpg. Begoh
Mambong (N19)	Gerung	198/19/18	Balai Raya Kpg. Gerung
Mambong (N19)	Semadang	198/19/19	SK St. Patrick Semadang
Mambong (N19)	Karu	198/19/20	SK Puruh Karu
Mambong (N19)	Seratau	198/19/21	SK St. Francis Xavier Kpg. Seratau
Mambong (N19)	Punau	198/19/22	SK St. George Punau
Mambong (N19)	Bunuk	198/19/23	SK St. Paul Bunuk
Mambong (N19)	Batu Gong	198/19/24	Balai Raya Batu Gong
Mambong (N19)	Anah Rais	198/19/25	SK St. Philip Padawan
Mambong (N19)	Sepit	198/19/26	Balai Raya Kpg. Sepit; Balai Raya Kpg. Parang; Balai Raya Kph. Assum
Mambong (N19)	Kiding	198/19/27	Balai Raya Kpg. Kiding; Balai Raya Kpg. Biya Kakas
Mambong (N19)	Simuti	198/19/28	Dewan Serbaguna Kpg. Sibakar
Mambong (N19)	Maras	198/18/29	Balai Raya Kpg. Nusaraya; Balai Raya Kpg. Biya Kemas
Mambong (N19)	Sadir	198/19/30	SK St. Bernard Sadir
Mambong (N19)	Pengkalan Ampat	198/19/31	SK Pengkalan Ampat
Mambong (N19)	Masaan	198/19/32	Dewan Manggeng Kpg Masaan
Tarat（N20）	Tijirak	198/20/01	SK St. Elizabeth Tijirak
Tarat（N20）	Petung	198/20/02	SK Patung
Tarat（N20）	Tabuan Rabak	198/20/03	Balai Raya Tabuan Rabak
Tarat（N20）	Simpuk	198/20/04	SK St. Peter Simpuk
Tarat（N20）	Sekuduk	198/20/05	SK Swithun Payang
Tarat（N20）	Panchor	198/20/06	SK St. Ambrose Kpg. Panchor
Tarat（N20）	Pekan Tarat	198/20/07	SJK (C) Chung Hua Batu 35
Tarat（N20）	Baki	198/20/08	SJK (C) Chung Hua Batu 32
Tarat（N20）	Ampungan	198/20/09	SK St. Alban Ampungan
Tarat（N20）	Tapah	198/20/10	SJK (C) Tapah
Tarat（N20）	Mundai	198/20/11	SK St. Mathew Mundai
Tarat（N20）	Beratok	198/20/12	SJK (C) Beratok
Tarat（N20）	Pesang	198/20/13	SK Pesang Begu; Dewan Serbaguna Kpg. Serumah
Tarat（N20）	Gayu	198/20/14	SK Kpg. Gayu
Tarat（N20）	Sarig	198/20/15	Balai Raya Kpg. Sarig
Tarat（N20）	Sira	198/20/16	Balai Raya Kpg. Sira
Tarat（N20）	Teng Bungkap	198/20/17	Balai Raya Kpg. Krian
Tarat（N20）	Subang	198/20/18	Balai Raya Kpg. Subang
Tarat（N20）	Stabut	199/20/19	Balai Raya Kpg. Stabut
Tarat（N20）	Peraya	198/20/20	Balai Raya Kpg. Peraya
Tarat（N20）	Maang	198/20/21	SK St. Dunstan
Tarat（N20）	Merakep	198/20/22	SK St. James Rayang
Tarat（N20）	Bisira	198/20/23	Balai Raya Kpg. Bisira
Tarat（N20）	Dunuk	198/20/24	SK Pelaman Sindunuk
Tarat（N20）	Semaru	198/20/25	Dewan Serbaguna Kpg. Semaru
Tarat（N20）	Belimbing	198/20/26	SK St. Edward Belimbing
Tarat（N20）	Retoh	198/20/27	SK Rituh
Tarat（N20）	Sungai Barie	198/20/28	Balai Raya Kpg. Entawa Sg. Barie; SK Sg. Kenyah
Tarat（N20）	Tarat Baru	198/20/29	SK Tarat
Tarat（N20）	Munggu Lalang	198/20/30	SK St. Bernabas Baru
Tarat（N20）	Rayang	198/20/31	SK Rayang
Tarat（N20）	Sebemban	198/20/32	SK Sebemban
Tarat（N20）	Tanah Puteh	198/20/33	SK Tanah Puteh; RH Panjang, Kpg. Munggu Kopi

=== Representation history ===
Members of Parliament for Puncak Borneo
Parliament	No	Years	Member	Party	Vote Share
Constituency created, renamed from Mambong
14th	P198	2018-2020	Willie Mongin	PH (PKR)	18,865; 54.65%
14th	P198	2020-2022	Willie Mongin	PN (BERSATU)	18,865; 54.65%
14th	P198	2022	Willie Mongin	GPS (PBB)	18,865; 54.65%
15th	P198	2022–present	Willie Mongin	GPS (PBB)	29,457; 57.58%

=== State constituency ===
Parliamentary constituency	State constituency					
Parliamentary constituency	1969–1978	1978–1990	1990–1999	1999–2008	2008–2016	2016−present
Puncak Borneo						Mambong
Puncak Borneo						Serembu
Puncak Borneo						Tarat

=== Historical boundaries ===
State Constituency	Area
State Constituency	2015
Mambong	Bengoh; Kampung Kakas; Kampung Semuti; Mambong; Siburan
Serembu	Kampung Kandis; Kampung Peninjau; Kampung Tringgus Matan Nguan; Serembu; Siniawan
Tarat	Beratok; Kampung Sadir; Kampung Sebemban; Kampung Sira; Teng Bukap

=== Current state assembly members ===
No.	State Constituency	Member	Coalition (Party)
N18	Serembu	Miro Simuh	GPS (PBB)
N19	Mambong	Jerip Susil	GPS (PBB)
N20	Tarat	Roland Sagah Wee Inn	GPS (PBB)

=== Local governments & postcodes ===
No.	State Constituency	Local Government	Postcode
N18	Serembu	Padawan Municipal Council (Siniawan area); Bau District Council	93250 Kuching; 94000 Bau; 94200 Siburan; 94700 Serian
N19	Mambong	Padawan Municipal Council; Serian District Council (Bukit Jabeh and Bukit Sebatuh areas)	93250 Kuching; 94000 Bau; 94200 Siburan; 94700 Serian
N20	Tarat	Padawan Municipal Council (Gunong Ridong and Gunong Angob areas); Serian District Council	93250 Kuching; 94000 Bau; 94200 Siburan; 94700 Serian

== Election results ==
Malaysian general election, 2022: Puncak Borneo
Party	Candidate	Votes	%	∆%
GPS	Willie Mongin	29,457	57.58	▲57.58
PH	Diog Dios	16,119	31.51	▲31.51
PSB	Tomson Ango	5,578	10.90	▲10.90
Total valid votes		51,154	100.00	
Total rejected ballots		640		
Unreturned ballots		255		
Turnout		52,049	63.97	▼12.13
Registered electors		79,969		
Majority		13,338	26.07	▲14.47
GPS gain from PKR		Swing		?
Source(s) https://lom.agc.gov.my/ilims/upload/portal/akta/outputp/1753265/PARLIMEN%20SARAWAK%20(PUB%20620).pdf

Malaysian general election, 2018: Puncak Borneo
Party	Candidate	Votes	%
PKR	Willie Mongin	18,865	54.65
BN	Genot Sinel @ Jeannoth Sinel	14,860	43.05
STAR	Buln Patrick Ribos	795	2.30
Total valid votes		34,520	100.00
Total rejected ballots		514	
Unreturned ballots		108	
Turnout		35,142	76.10
Registered electors		46,180	
Majority		4,005	11.60
This was a new constituency created.
Source(s) "His Majesty's Government Gazette - Notice of Contested Election, Parliament for the State of Sarawak [P.U. (B) 247/2018]" (PDF). Attorney General's Chambers of Malaysia. 3 May 2018. "Federal Government Gazette - Results of Contested Election and Statements of the Poll after the Official Addition of Votes, Parliamentary Constituencies for the State of Sarawak [P.U. (B) 321/2018]" (PDF). Attorney General's Chambers of Malaysia. 28 May 2018. Archived from the original (PDF) on December 29, 2019.
