= William Nyallau Badak =

Malaysian politician and judge (1951–2025)

Yang Berbahagia Datuk William Nyallau Badak PJN

Member of the Malaysian Parliament for Lubok Antu
- In office 8 March 2008 – 9 May 2018
- Preceded by: Jawah Gerang (BN–PRS)
- Succeeded by: Jugah Muyang (Independent)
- Majority: 1,610 (2008); 4,091 (2013)

Personal details
- Born: William Nyallau Badak; 22 July 1951 Crown Colony of Sarawak (now Sarawak, Malaysia)
- Died: 20 January 2025 (aged 73) Kota Samarahan, Sarawak, Malaysia
- Cause of death: Heart complications
- Citizenship: Malaysian
- Party: Parti Rakyat Sarawak (PRS) (–2018); Parti Sarawak Bersatu (PSB) (2019–2022); Independent (2018–2019,2022–2025)
- Other political affiliations: Barisan Nasional (BN) (–2018)
- Occupation: Politician
- Profession: Judge

William Nyallau Badak (22 July 1951 – 20 January 2025) was a Malaysian politician and judge who served as the Member of Parliament (MP) for Lubok Antu from March 2008 to May 2018. He was an independent in support of the Gabungan Parti Sarawak (GPS) coalition and was a member of the Parti Sarawak Bersatu (PSB) and the Parti Rakyat Sarawak (PRS), a former component party of the Barisan Nasional (BN) coalition. He was elected to Parliament in the 2008 election, replacing long-serving incumbent Jawah Gerang. Before entering Parliament, he was a Native Court judge. He joined PSB in 2019 after he was sacked from PRS on 22 April 2018 and dropped as a candidate in the 2018 general election. In 2021 Sarawak state election, he contested the Batang Ai state seat as a PSB candidate but lost. On 8 November 2022, he left PSB and pledged his support of GPS.

== Death ==
On 20 January 2025, William Nyallau died from heart complications at the Sarawak Heart Centre, Kota Samarahan, Sarawak, Malaysia at the age of 73.

== Election results ==
Parliament of Malaysia
Year	Constituency	Candidate	Votes	Pct	Opponent(s)	Votes	Pct	Ballots cast	Majority	Turnout
2004	P203 Lubok Antu	William Nyallau Badak (IND)	4,927	41.44%	Jawah Gerang (PRS)	6,962	58.56%	12,139	2,035	68.79%
2008	P203 Lubok Antu	William Nyallau Badak (PRS)	6,769	56.75%	Nicholas Bawin Anggat (IND)	5,159	43.25%	12,038	1,610	70.03%
2013	P203 Lubok Antu	William Nyallau Badak (PRS)	8,278	55.21%	Larry Soon @ Larry Sng Wei Shien (SWP)	4,187	27.92%	15,166	4,091	78.57%
2013	P203 Lubok Antu	William Nyallau Badak (PRS)	8,278	55.21%	Nicholas Bawin Anggat (PKR)	2,530	16.87%	15,166	4,091	78.57%

Sarawak State Legislative Assembly
Year	Constituency	Candidate	Votes	Pct	Opponent(s)	Votes	Pct	Valid votes	Majority	Turnout
2021	N34 Batang Ai	William Nyallau Badak (PSB)	1,366	18.99%	Malcom Mussen Lamoh (PRS)	3,208	44.59%	7,195	738	72.99%
2021	N34 Batang Ai	William Nyallau Badak (PSB)	1,366	18.99%	John Linang Mereejon (IND)	2,470	34.33%	7,195	738	72.99%
2021	N34 Batang Ai	William Nyallau Badak (PSB)	1,366	18.99%	Usup Asun (PBK)	151	2.10%	7,195	738	72.99%

== Honours ==
- Malaysia
  - Commander of the Order of Meritorious Service (PJN) – Datuk (2014)
