= Willie Mongin =

Malaysian politician

Yang Berhormat Datuk Willie Mongin PMW MP

Deputy Minister of Plantation Industries and Commodities II
- In office 30 August 2021 – 24 November 2022 Serving with Wee Jeck Seng
- Monarch: Abdullah
- Prime Minister: Ismail Sabri Yaakob
- Minister: Zuraida Kamaruddin
- Preceded by: Himself
- Succeeded by: Siti Aminah Aching
- Constituency: Puncak Borneo
- In office 10 March 2020 – 16 August 2021 Serving with Wee Jeck Seng
- Monarch: Abdullah
- Prime Minister: Muhyiddin Yassin
- Minister: Mohd Khairuddin Aman Razali
- Preceded by: Shamsul Iskandar Md. Akin
- Succeeded by: Himself
- Constituency: Puncak Borneo

Member of the Malaysian Parliament for Puncak Borneo
- Incumbent
- Assumed office 9 May 2018
- Preceded by: James Dawos Mamit (BN–PBB)
- Majority: 4,005 (2018); 13,338 (2022)

Personal details
- Born: Willie Anak Mongin; 2 June 1975 (age 51) Sarawak, Malaysia
- Citizenship: Malaysian
- Party: Parti Pesaka Bumiputera Bersatu (PBB) (since 2022)
- Other political affiliations: Pakatan Rakyat (PR) (2009–2015); Pakatan Harapan (PH) (2015–2020 & aligned since 2022); Perikatan Nasional People's Justice Party (PKR) (2009–2020) (PN) (2020–2022 & aligned:2022-2022); Barisan Nasional (BN) (aligned:since 2020); Gabungan Parti Sarawak (GPS) (since 2022)
- Spouse: Yee Chooi Ling
- Children: 2
- Occupation: Politician
- Profession: Software engineer Entrepreneur

Willie Anak Mongin (born 2 June 1975) is a Malaysian politician, entrepreneur, and software engineer who is serving as the Member of Parliament (MP) for Puncak Borneo since May 2018. A member of Parti Pesaka Bumiputera Bersatu, he served as the Deputy Minister of Plantation Industries and Commodities II from August 2021 until November 2022 and from March 2020 to August 2021.

== Political career ==
=== 2011 Sarawak state election ===
In the 2011 election, Willie under his party of People's Justice Party (PKR) faced Jerip Susil of Barisan Nasional and lost in a large majority.

=== 2013 general election ===
In the 2013 election, Willie faced James Dawos Mamit at Mambong (now as Puncak Borneo) of PBB but losing again the parliamentary seat.

=== 2016 Sarawak state election ===
In the 2016 election, Willie faced Jerip Susil in winning for the Mambong state seat and lost in a large majority.

=== 2018 general election ===
In the 2018 election, his party of PKR field him to contest the Puncak Borneo parliamentary seat again, defeating the incumbent candidate Genot Sinel.

=== Parliamentary Incidents and Controversy ===
In 2018, during a debate about introducing a Sales and Services Tax (SST), Bung Moktar Radin was recounting the price of goods at markets when Willie Mongin uttered in reference to a photo purportedly showing a person resembling Bung Moktar sitting in a casino:

Bukan kasino ke, Yang Kinabatangan?

Are you sure that was not a casino, representative of Kinabatangan?

Bung Moktar then pointed his finger at Willie and accused him of being rude, demanding a retraction and subsequently shouting "fuck you".

In 2021, Willie was under controversy after Batu Kawan MP Kasthuriraani Patto accused him for showing the finger twice during parliamentary debates.

== Election results ==
Parliament of Malaysia
Year	Constituency	Candidate	Votes	Pct	Opponent(s)	Votes	Pct	Ballots cast	Majority	Turnout
2013	P198 Mambong	Willie Mongin (PKR)	10,740	33.66%	James Dawos Mamit (PBB)	20,461	64.13%	32,695	9,721	77.21%
2013	P198 Mambong	Willie Mongin (PKR)	10,740	33.66%	Dripin Sakoi (STAR)	704	2.21%	32,695	9,721	77.21%
2018	P198 Puncak Borneo	Willie Mongin (PKR)	18,865	54.65%	Genot Sinel (PBB)	14,860	43.05%	35,142	4,005	76.10%
2018	P198 Puncak Borneo	Willie Mongin (PKR)	18,865	54.65%	Buln Patrick Ribos (STAR)	795	2.30%	35,142	4,005	76.10%
2022	P198 Puncak Borneo	Willie Mongin (PBB)	29,457	57.58%	Diog Dios (PKR)	16,119	31.51%	52,049	13,338	63.97%
2022	P198 Puncak Borneo	Willie Mongin (PBB)	29,457	57.58%	Iana Akam (PSB)	5,578	10.90%	52,049	13,338	63.97%

Sarawak State Legislative Assembly
Year	Constituency	Candidate	Votes	Pct	Opponent(s)	Votes	Pct	Ballots cast	Majority	Turnout
2011	N16 Bengoh	Willie Mongin (PKR)	4,447	30.72%	Jerip Susil (SUPP)	8,093	55.91%	14,830	3,646	67.55%
2011	N16 Bengoh	Willie Mongin (PKR)	4,447	30.72%	Wejok Tomik (IND)	1,007	6.96%	14,830	3,646	67.55%
2011	N16 Bengoh	Willie Mongin (PKR)	4,447	30.72%	Richard @ Peter Margaret (SNAP)	928	6.41%	14,830	3,646	67.55%
2016	N19 Mambong	Willie Mongin (PKR)	2,645	22.74%	Jerip Susil (PSB)	6,161	52.96%	11,904	3,333	68.15%
2016	N19 Mambong	Willie Mongin (PKR)	2,645	22.74%	Sanjan Daik (DAP)	2,828	24.31%	11,904	3,333	68.15%

== Honours ==
=== Honours of Malaysia ===
- Malaysia
  - Recipient of the 17th Yang di-Pertuan Agong Installation Medal (2024)
- Federal Territory (Malaysia)
  - Commander of the Order of the Territorial Crown (PMW) – Datuk (2021)
- Sarawak
  - Silver Medal of the Sarawak Independence Diamond Jubilee Medal (2024)
