= Siburan District =

Siburan
- District of Malaysia
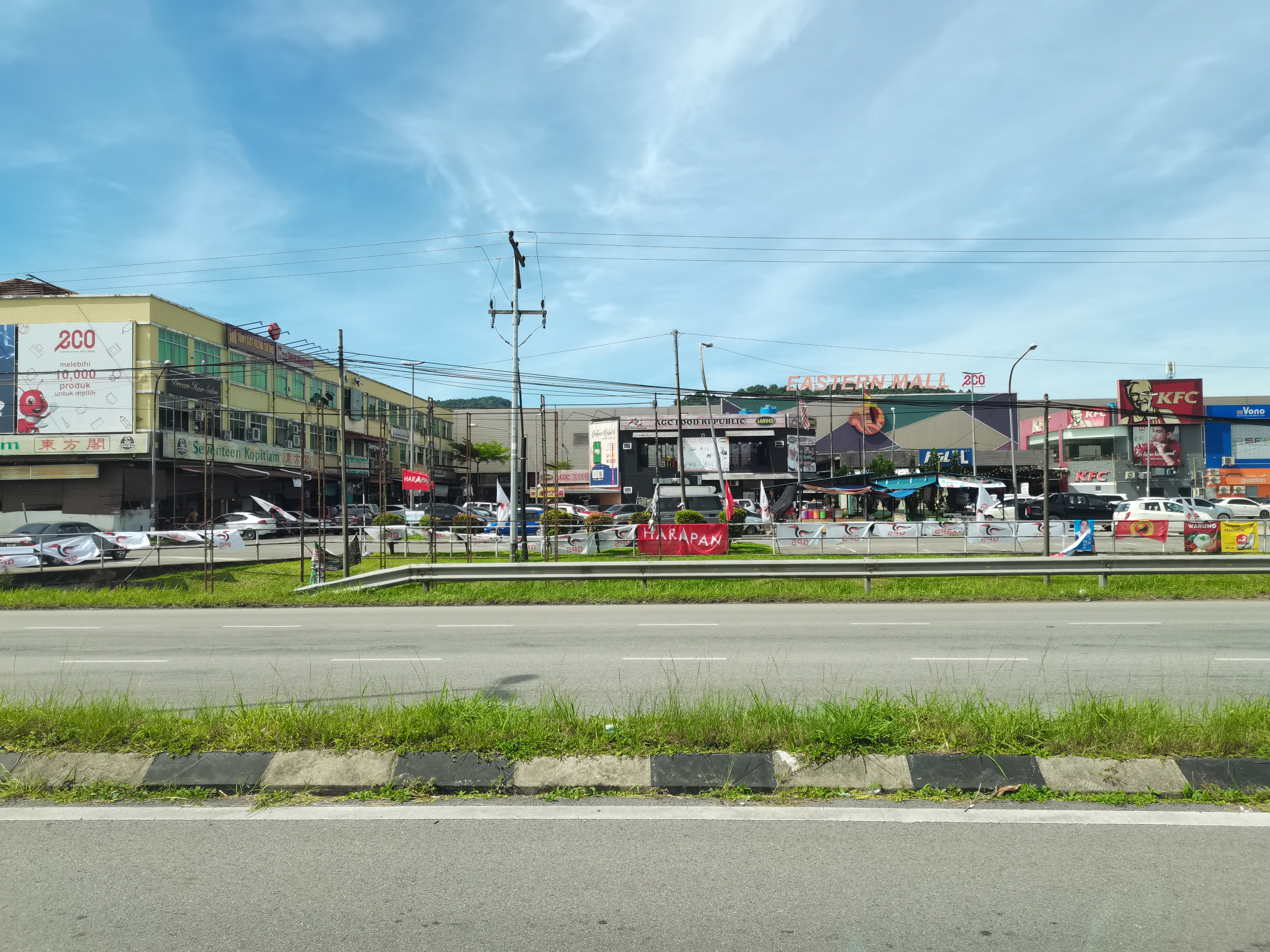
- The town of Siburan

- Seal
- Interactive map of Siburan
- Country: Malaysia
- State: Sarawak
- Division: Serian Division
- District Office location: Siburan
- Local area government(s): Serian District Council
- License plate prefix: Q

Siburan District (Chinese: 新生村) is a town and district under the Serian Division, Sarawak, Malaysia. It is 26 km (16 miles) by road from Kuching.

== Governance ==
Previously a suburb of metropolitan Kuching, Siburan was made an autonomous sub-district and transferred from Kuching Division to the newly-formed Serian Division in April 2015.

Siburan was upgraded to a full district in November 2021.

=== Local government ===
Serian District Council (Majlis Daerah Serian)

=== Parliament ===
Puncak Borneo (Willie Mongin - GPS)

=== State assemblyman ===
Mambong (Jerip Susil - GPS)
