= Roy Angau Gingkoi =

Malaysian politician

Yang Berhormat Tuan Roy Angau Gingkoi PBS MP

Member of the Malaysian Parliament for Lubok Antu
- Incumbent
- Assumed office 19 November 2022
- Preceded by: Jugah Muyang (PH–PKR)
- Majority: 100 (2022)

Personal details
- Born: Roy Angau anak Gingkoi
- Party: Parti Rakyat Sarawak (PRS)
- Other political affiliations: Gabungan Parti Sarawak (GPS)

Roy Angau anak Gingkoi is a Malaysian politician who has served as the Member of Parliament (MP) for Lubok Antu since November 2022. He is a member of Parti Rakyat Sarawak (PRS), a component party of the Gabungan Parti Sarawak (GPS) and formerly Barisan Nasional (BN) coalitions.

== Election results ==
Parliament of Malaysia
Year	Constituency	Candidate	Votes	Pct	Opponent(s)	Votes	Pct	Ballots cast	Majority	Turnout
2022	P203 Lubok Antu	Roy Angau Gingkoi (PRS)	6,644	34.44%	Johnical Rayong Ngipa (PSB)	6,544	33.92%	19,537	100	66.54%
2022	P203 Lubok Antu	Roy Angau Gingkoi (PRS)	6,644	34.44%	Jugah Muyang (BERSATU)	5,360	27.78%	19,537	100	66.54%
2022	P203 Lubok Antu	Roy Angau Gingkoi (PRS)	6,644	34.44%	Langga Lias (PKR)	746	3.87%	19,537	100	66.54%

== Honours ==
=== Honours of Malaysia ===
- Malaysia
  - Recipient of the 17th Yang di-Pertuan Agong Installation Medal (2024)
- Sarawak
  - Officer of the Most Exalted Order of the Star of Sarawak (PBS) (2024)
  - Silver Medal of the Sarawak Independence Diamond Jubilee Medal (2024)
