= Miri Crocodile Farm cum Mini Zoo =

Crocodile farm and zoo in Sarawak, Malaysia

Coordinates: 4°34′17.0″N 113°58′38.6″E

Miri Crocodile Farm Wildlife Mini Zoo Taman Buaya Miri dan Zoo Mini
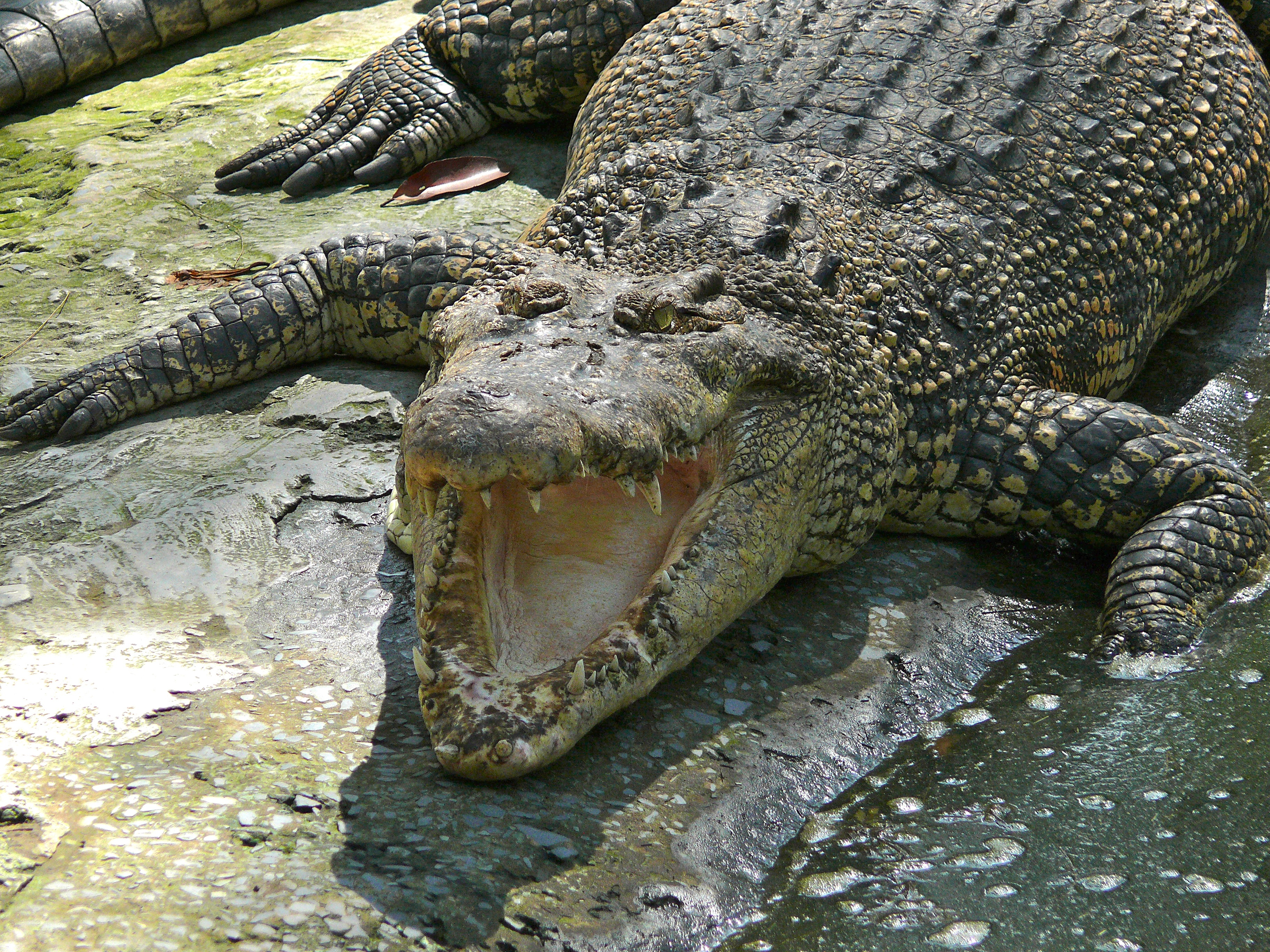
- Interactive map of Miri Crocodile Farm Wildlife Mini Zoo; Taman Buaya Miri dan Zoo Mini
- Date opened: 16 August 1998
- Location: Miri, Sarawak, Malaysia
- Land area: 9 hectares
- Owner: Benaya Sdn Bhd.
- Management: Benaya Sdn Bhd.
- Website: Official website

The Miri Crocodile Farm Wildlife Mini Zoo (Malay: Taman Buaya Miri dan Zoo Mini) is a crocodile farm and zoo in Miri, Sarawak, Malaysia. It is registered by the Convention on International Trade in Endangered Species of Wild Fauna and Flora.

== History ==
The farm and zoo was opened on 16 August 1998. It became the second crocodile farm opened in Sarawak after the Jong's Crocodile Farm and Zoo in Kuching.

== Architecture ==
The farm and zoo is located in a 9 hectare of area near the mouth of Baram River. Man-made ponds were created for the breeding ground of the crocodiles. It houses more than 1,000 species of crocodiles. It also features an information center about various aspects of crocodiles, such as fatal clashes with humans, life cycle etc.

== Operation ==
The monthly expenses for the farm and zoo is around MYR40,000-50,000, in which mostly goes to buying foods for the animals and its 15 staffs salary. They regularly seek assistance from the Tourism Board.

== See also ==
- List of tourist attractions in Malaysia
