= William Nais =

Sarawakian ethnographer

Dato Sri William Nais PNBS
- Born: 2 February 1912; Quop, Kuching, Raj of Sarawak
- Died: 3 November 2001 (aged 89); Kuching, Sarawak
- Education: St Thomas' School
- Occupations: Ethnographer; Civil servant

William Nais (2 February 1912 – 3 November 2001) was a Malaysian ethnographer and civil servant of Bidayuh descent. He is most known for his work in ethnography on the Bidayuh people of Sarawak.

== Early life and education ==
William Nais was born on February 2, 1912 in Quop, Kuching. He was the second of six children. He attended St Thomas' School for his primary and secondary education, finishing in 1931 with a Junior Cambridge Certificate.

== Early career ==
William's first job was as a teacher at an S.P.G. mission school in Saratok in 1933, and then at St James' in Quop. In 1936, the Bishop of Kuching asked William to take charge of church work, hoping that William would be called to the priesthood.

In 1946, William joined the colonial Sarawak government as a native officer under the Secretariat in Kuching. During this time, he was posted to various resident and district offices in Kuching, Lundu, Sibu, Betong, and Simanggang. In 1952, he became an assistant district officer in Serian.

In 1954, he was sent the United Kingdom to study a course on local government, after returning from which he was made the acting District officer in Serian. While posted in Bintangor, he promoted to full district officer in 1960. While serving in Simanggang, he became the first person of Bidayuh descent to become a Resident of a division before retiring in 1970.

== Ethnography ==
In 1976, William became senior researcher with the Council for Customs and Traditions where he compiled and published Bidayuh oral traditions. His work laid the groundwork for the Adat Bidayuh Order of 1994 under the Native Customary Laws Ordinance which governs the native courts system in Sarawak. His work covered various aspects of Bidayuh culture such as the compilation of local myths, folklore, prayers, rituals, and songs.

== Political career ==
William unsuccessfully stood as an independent political candidate in 1969 and 1974 for the state constituency of Bengoh.

== Death ==
William died on 3 November, 2001 at 89 in Kuching.

== Awards and recognitions ==
- Sarawak
  - Knight Commander of the Most Exalted Order of the Star of Sarawak (PNBS) – Dato (1991)
  - Officer of the Most Exalted Order of the Star of Sarawak (PBS)
  - Member of the Most Exalted Order of the Star of Sarawak (ABS)

== Publications ==
- Nais, W. (1993). The study of Dayak Bidayuh occult arts of divination. Sarawak Literary Society.
