= Jugah Muyang =

Malaysian politician

Member of the Malaysian Parliament for Lubok Antu
- In office 9 May 2018 – 19 November 2022
- Preceded by: William Nyallau Badak (BN–PRS)
- Succeeded by: Roy Angau Gingkoi (GPS–PRS)
- Majority: 1,059 (2018)

Faction represented in Dewan Rakyat
- 2018–2020: Pakatan Harapan
- 2020–2022: Independent

Personal details
- Born: Tambat Jugah Anak Muyang; 3 April 1964 (age 62) Sarawak, Malaysia
- Party: Parti Rakyat Sarawak (PRS) (–2018); People's Justice Party (PKR) (2018–2020); Independent (2018, 2020–2022); Malaysian United Indigenous Party (BERSATU) (2022–2026); National Vision Party (WAWASAN) (since 2026)
- Other political affiliations: Pakatan Harapan (PH) (2018–2020); Perikatan Nasional (PN) (2022–2026, aligned:2020–2022); Barisan Nasional (BN) (–2018, aligned:2020–2022)
- Relations: Andrew Janggi Muyang (brother)
- Occupation: Politician

Tambat Jugah Anak Muyang (born 3 April 1964) is a Malaysian politician who served as the Member of Parliament (MP) for Lubok Antu from May 2018 to November 2022. He is a member of the Parti Wawasan Negara (WAWASAN), a component party of the Perikatan Nasional (PN) coalition and was formerly a member of both the People's Justice Party (PKR), a component party of then Pakatan Harapan (PH) opposition coalition and the Parti Rakyat Sarawak (PRS), a component party of the ruling Gabungan Parti Sarawak (GPS) coalition which in turn it was a former component of the Barisan Nasional (BN) coalition as well as an independent in support for the ruling PN and BN coalitions. He is also the younger brother of his predecessor and former Lubok Antu MP, Andrew Janggi Muyang (born 1947), who served from 1982 until his death in 1987 at the age of 40 whilst serving in office.

== Personal life ==
Muyang was born on 3 April 1964. He is from Rumah Machau, Nanga Kumpang Engkilili, Lubok Antu, Sri Aman Division, Sarawak. He is the younger brother of Andrew Janggi Muyang, who was also his predecessor and the Lubok Antu MP for one term from 1982 until his death in 1987.

== Education ==
He holds a bachelor's degree in Human Resource Management.

== Political career ==
Before contesting an independent candidate and winning the Lubok Antu federal seat in the 2018 general election, he was a PRS member. After becoming Lubok Antu MP, he joined PKR, a component party of the PH coalition which was in federal government before being ousted at the start of the 2020–2022 Malaysian political crisis in February 2020. On 5 June 2020, he left PKR and became a government-aligned independent politician, in which he pledged his support to Prime Minister Muhyiddin Yassin and his PN coalition as well as the BN coalition acting as a confidence and supply partner. Although many former PKR MPs like him had joined BERSATU and PN, he did not follow suit and remained as an independent from 2020 to 2022, he applied to rejoin PRS but received a negative response from the party. He later joined BERSATU directly as a member in order to defend the Lubok Antu seat in the 2022 general election representing the coalition.

== Election results ==
Parliament of Malaysia
Year	Constituency	Candidate	Votes	Pct	Opponent(s)	Votes	Pct	Ballots cast	Majority	Turnout
2018	P203 Lubok Antu	Jugah Muyang (IND)	5,834	40.09%	Robert Pasang Alam (PRS)	4,775	32.82%	14,551	1,059	71.08%
2018	P203 Lubok Antu	Jugah Muyang (IND)	5,834	40.09%	Nicholas Bawin Anggat (PKR)	3,942	27.09%	14,551	1,059	71.08%
2022	P203 Lubok Antu	Jugah Muyang (BERSATU)	5,360	27.78%	Roy Angau Gingkoi (PRS)	6,644	34.44%	19,294	100	66.54%
2022	P203 Lubok Antu	Jugah Muyang (BERSATU)	5,360	27.78%	Johnical Rayong Ngipa (PSB)	6,544	33.92%	19,294	100	66.54%
2022	P203 Lubok Antu	Jugah Muyang (BERSATU)	5,360	27.78%	Langga Lias (PKR)	746	3.87%	19,294	100	66.54%
