= Malcom Mussen Lamoh =

Malaysian politician

Yang Berhormat Datuk Malcolm Mussen Lamoh PGBK KMN PBS MLA

State Deputy Minister of International Trade and Investment of Sarawak
- Incumbent
- Assumed office 4 January 2022
- Minister: Awang Tengah Ali Hasan
- Governor: Abdul Taib Mahmud Wan Junaidi Tuanku Jaafar
- Premier: Abang Abdul Rahman Johari Abang Openg
- Preceded by: Himself (International Trade)

State Deputy Minister of International Trade and Industry, Industrial Terminal and Entrepreneur Development (Development and Industry)
- In office 22 September 2021 – 18 December 2021 Serving with Mohd Naroden Majais
- Minister: Awang Tengah Ali Hasan
- Governor: Abdul Taib Mahmud
- Premier: Abang Abdul Rahman Johari Abang Openg
- Preceded by: Mohd Naroden Majais (Entrepreneur Development); Julaihi Narawi (Industrial Development)
- Succeeded by: Himself (International Trade); Ripin Lamat (Entrepreneur Development)

Member of the Sarawak State Legislative Assembly for Batang Ai (since 2016) (previously known as Batang Air (2009-2016))
- Incumbent
- Assumed office 7 April 2009
- Preceded by: Dublin Unting Ingkot (BN-PBB)
- Majority: 1,854 (2009); 2,741 (2011); 3,186 (2016); 738 (2021)

Personal details
- Born: 8 April 1959 (age 66) Crown Colony of Sarawak
- Party: Parti Rakyat Sarawak (PRS)
- Other political affiliations: Barisan Nasional (BN) (–2018, aligned : since 2020); Gabungan Parti Sarawak (GPS) (since 2018); Perikatan Nasional (PN) (aligned : since 2020)
- Occupation: Politician

Malcolm Mussen anak Lamoh is a Malaysian politician who has served as State Deputy Minister of International Trade and Investment of Sarawak under Premier Abang Abdul Rahman Johari Abang Openg and Minister Awang Tengah Ali Hasan since January 2022 and Member of the Sarawak State Legislative Assembly (MLA) for Batang Ai since May 2016 and Batang Air from April 2009 to May 2016. He also served as the State Deputy Minister of International Trade and Industry, Industrial Terminal and Entrepreneur Development (Development and Industry) in the GPS state administration under Abang Johari and Awang Tengah from September to December 2021. He is a member of the Parti Rakyat Sarawak (PRS), a component party of the ruling Gabungan Parti Sarawak (GPS) coalition. He was elected in 2009 Batang Air by-election after the incumbent died of heart attack and re-elected in 2011, 2016 and 2021.

Mussen holds a bachelor's degree from Universiti Putra Malaysia and a master's degree from the University of Warwick. He is former Senior Engineer in Public Works Department Sarawak. He can speak fluently in Bahasa Malaysia, English, Japanese and Mandarin.

== Election results ==
Sarawak State Legislative Assembly
Year	Constituency	Candidate	Votes	Pct	Opponent(s)	Votes	Pct	Valid votes	Majority	Turnout
2009	N29 Batang Air	Malcom Mussen Lamoh (PRS)	3,907	65.50%	Jawah Gerang (PKR)	2,053	34.45%	5,960	1,854	75.32%
2011	N29 Batang Air	Malcom Mussen Lamoh (PRS)	4,460	72.18%	Nicholas Bawin Anggat (PKR)	1,719	27.82%	6,179	2,741	71.96%
2016	N34 Batang Ai	Malcom Mussen Lamoh (PRS)	4,884	74.20%	Kolien Liong (PKR)	1,698	25.80%	6,582	3.186	70.75%
2021	N34 Batang Ai	Malcom Mussen Lamoh (PRS)	3,208	44.59%	John Linang Mereejon (IND)	2,470	34.33%	7,195	738	72.99%
2021	N34 Batang Ai	Malcom Mussen Lamoh (PRS)	3,208	44.59%	William Nyallau Badak (PSB)	1,366	18.99%	7,195	738	72.99%
2021	N34 Batang Ai	Malcom Mussen Lamoh (PRS)	3,208	44.59%	Usup Asun (PBK)	151	2.10%	7,195	738	72.99%

== Honours ==
- Malaysia
  - Officer of the Order of the Defender of the Realm (KMN) (2016)
- Sarawak
  - Commander of the Order of the Star of Hornbill Sarawak (PGBK) – Datuk (2019)
  - Officer of the Most Exalted Order of the Star of Sarawak (PBS) (2012)
