= Jong's Crocodile Farm and Zoo =

Crocodile farm and zoo in Kuching, Sarawak, Malaysia

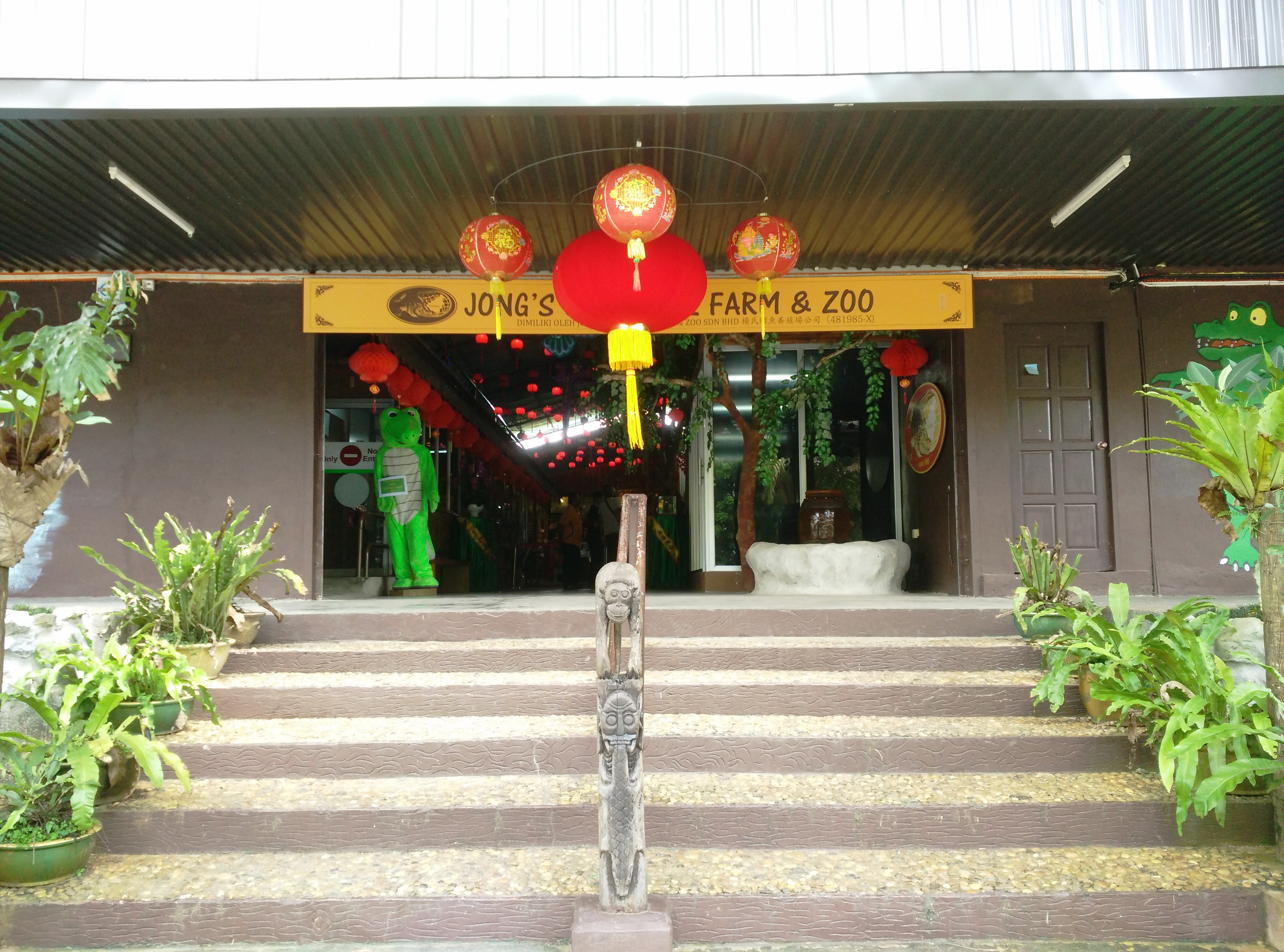
- Interactive map of Jong's Crocodile Farm and Zoo
- 1°24′46.7″N 110°20′8.5″E
- Date opened: 1979 (original site)
- Location: Siburan, Kuching, Sarawak, Malaysia
- Land area: 10 hectares
- Management: Jong's Crocodile Farm & Zoo Sdn Bhd
- Website: Official website

The Jong's Crocodile Farm and Zoo is a privately-run crocodile farm and zoo in Siburan, Kuching Division, Sarawak, Malaysia. It was originally started by Yong Kian Sen when he started to collect crocodiles in 1963. In 1979, his family purchased 1 hectare of land in Siburan for their crocodile farm. The crocodile farm and zoo is divided into barking deer, bear, bird, crocodile, deer, fish pond, monitor lizard, owl and eagle, porcupine and wild boar sections. The crocodile farm and zoo is opened everyday from 09:00 a.m. to 5:00 p.m.

The farm and zoo is one of seven crocodile farms in Malaysia that is registered under Convention on International Trade in Endangered Species of Wild Fauna and Flora (CITES).

== Gallery ==
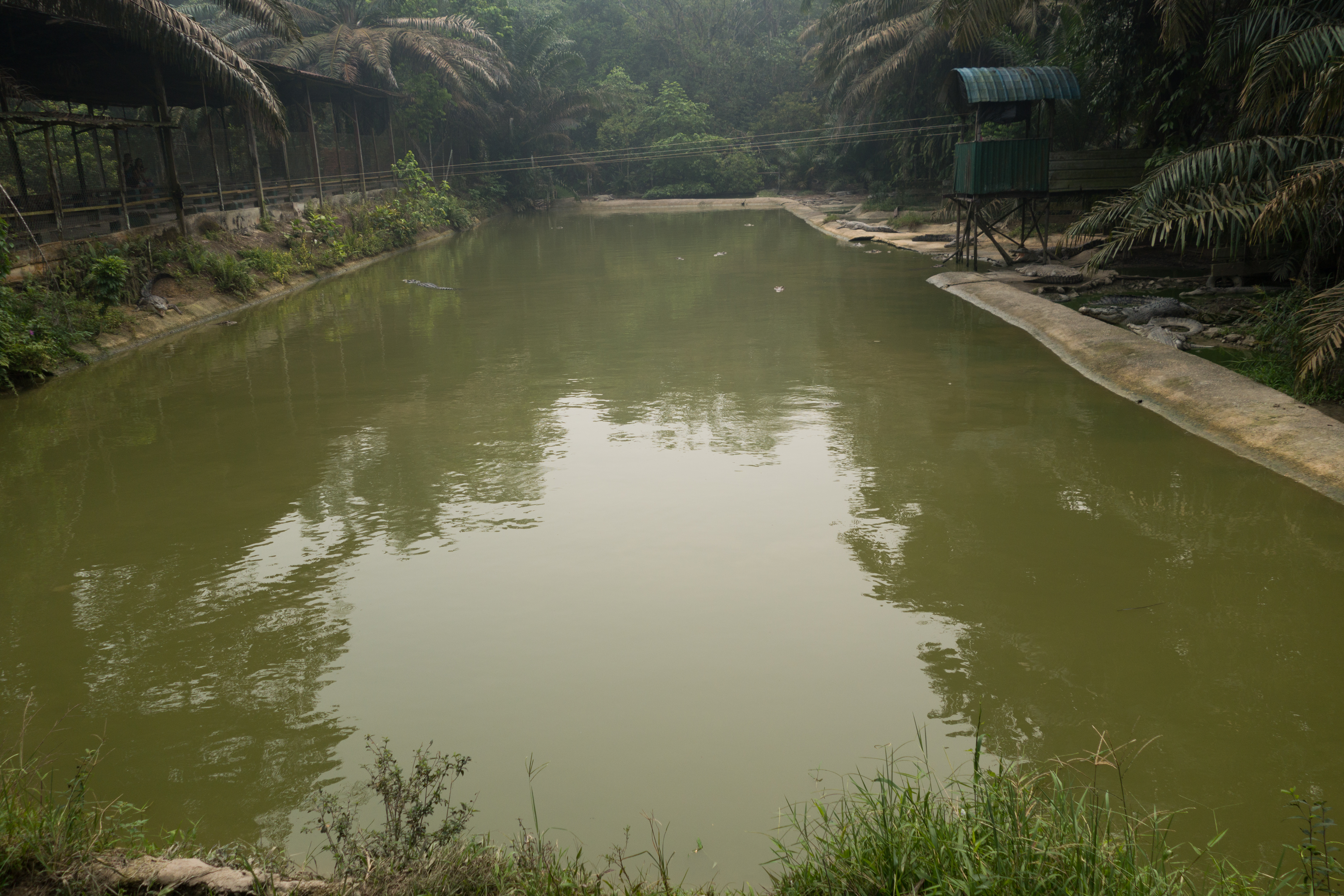
The view of the crocodile pond in 2016.

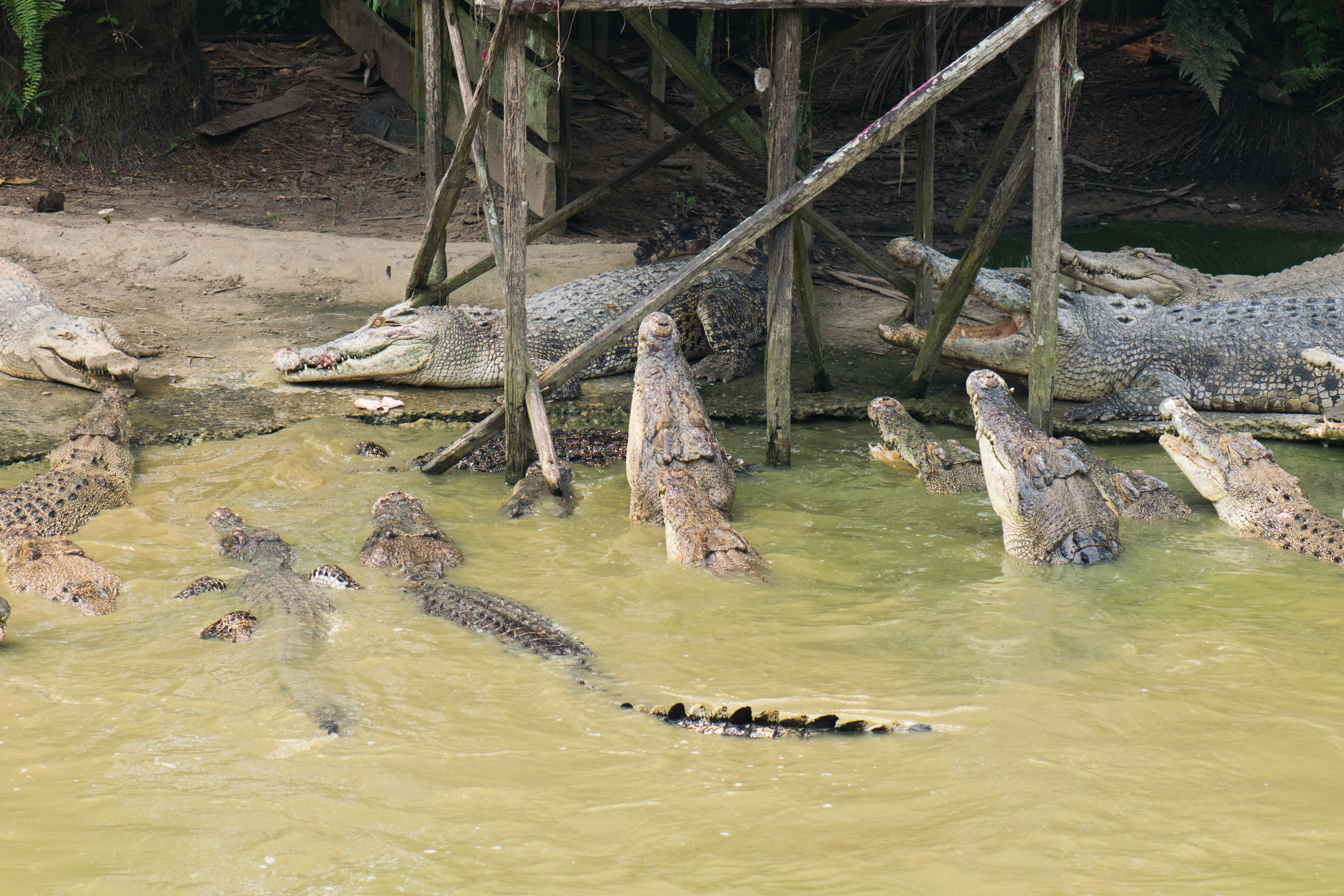
Crocodile feeding demonstration.

== See also ==
- List of tourist attractions in Malaysia
