= Engkilili (state constituency) =

State constituency in Sarawak, Malaysia

Engkilili (N33)
Sarawak constituency

State constituency
- Legislature: Sarawak State Legislative Assembly
MLA
Vacant
- Constituency created: 1977
- First contested: 1979
- Last contested: 2026

Engkilili is a state constituency in Sarawak, Malaysia, that has been represented in the Sarawak State Legislative Assembly since 1979.

The Engkilili state constituency was established during the 1977 electoral redistribution and is mandated to return a single member to the Sarawak State Legislative Assembly under the first past the post voting system.

== Demographics ==
Ethnic breakdown of Engkilili's electorate as of 2022
1. Sarawak bumiputera (85.6%)
2. Chinese (12.0%)
3. Malay-Muslim bumiputera (1.90%)
4. Other ethnicities (0.50%)

== History ==
As of 2020, Engkilili has a population of 12,597 people.

=== Polling districts ===
According to the gazette issued on 31 October 2022, the Engkilili constituency has a total of 24 polling districts.

State constituency	Polling Districts	Code	Location
Engkilili（N33）	Skrang	203/33/01	SK Lidong
Engkilili（N33）	Enteban	203/33/02	SK Ng. Enteban
Engkilili（N33）	Entalau	203/33/03	SK Entalau
Engkilili（N33）	Semanju	203/33/04	SK San Semanju
Engkilili（N33）	Kasenduh	203/33/05	SK Ijok
Engkilili（N33）	Engkilili	203/33/06	SJK (C) Chung Hua Engkilili
Engkilili（N33）	Tabut	203/33/07	SK Tabut
Engkilili（N33）	Aur	203/33/08	SK Isu / Bangat
Engkilili（N33）	Pentik	203/33/09	SK Skik Skrang
Engkilili（N33）	Jukat	203/33/10	SK Ng. Menjuau; RH Gait Keranggas
Engkilili（N33）	Selandong	203/33/11	RH Abon Panchor
Engkilili（N33）	Akup	203/33/12	RH Velly Sg. Pinang
Engkilili（N33）	Marutih	203/33/13	SK Ng. Tebat
Engkilili（N33）	Mujan	203/33/14	RH Nudong Murat
Engkilili（N33）	Kujoh	203/33/15	RH Mulok Kujoh
Engkilili（N33）	SPLU	203/33/16	SK Riban
Engkilili（N33）	Meridun	203/33/17	Tadika Kemas Merindun
Engkilili（N33）	Tawai	203/33/18	RH Henry Kudol
Engkilili（N33）	Basi	203/33/19	SK Basi
Engkilili（N33）	Geligau	203/33/20	SK Empelam
Engkilili（N33）	Sedarat	203/33/21	SK Stengin / Sedarat
Engkilili（N33）	Marop	203/33/22	SMK Engkilili
Engkilili（N33）	Merio	203/33/23	Balai Raya Ng. Merio
Engkilili（N33）	Merbong	203/33/24	SK Engkilili No. 1

=== Representation history ===
Members of the Legislative Assembly for Engkilili
Assembly	No	Years	Member	Party
Constituency created from Engkilili-Skrang and Ulu Ai
10th	N17	1979-1981	Nadeng Linggoh	BN (SNAP)
10th	N17	1981-1983	Jonathan Narwin	BN (SNAP)
11th	N17	1983-1987	Sung Cho Nang @ Sim Choo Nam (沈楚南)	Independent
12th	N22	1987-1991	Sung Cho Nang @ Sim Choo Nam (沈楚南)	PBDS
13th	N22	1991-1996	Toh Heng San (卓恒山)	BN (SUPP)
14th	N24	1996-2001	Toh Heng San (卓恒山)	BN (SUPP)
15th	N24	2001-2006	Toh Heng San (卓恒山)	BN (SUPP)
16th	N28	2006-2010	Johnical Rayong Ngipa	SNAP
16th	N28	2010-2011	Johnical Rayong Ngipa	BN (SUPP)
17th	N28	2011-2016	Johnical Rayong Ngipa	BN (SUPP)
18th	N33	2016–2018	Johnical Rayong Ngipa	BN (Direct)
18th	N33	2018-2021	Johnical Rayong Ngipa	PSB
19th	N33	2021–2024	Johnical Rayong Ngipa	PSB
19th	N33	2024-2026	Johnical Rayong Ngipa	GPS (PDP)

== Election results ==
Sarawak state election, 2026
Party	Candidate	Votes	%	∆%
GPS				▲
PH				▲
Total valid votes				
Total rejected ballots				
Unreturned ballots				
Turnout				
Registered electors				
Majority				

Sarawak state election, 2021
Party	Candidate	Votes	%	∆%
PSB	Johnical Rayong Ngipa	3,246	43.48	▼27.27
GPS	Desmond Sateng Sanjan	2,055	27.53	▲27.53
PBK	Stel Datu	2,013	26.97	▲26.97
Independent	Gemong Batu	151	2.02	▲2.02
Total valid votes		7,465	100.00	
Total rejected ballots		81		
Unreturned ballots		17		
Turnout		7,563	66.88	▼6.96
Registered electors		11,309		
Majority		1,191	15.95	▼33.55
PSB gain from BN		Swing		?
Source(s) https://lom.agc.gov.my/ilims/upload/portal/akta/outputp/1718688/PUB687.pdf

Sarawak state election, 2016
Party	Candidate	Votes	%	∆%
BN	Johnical Rayong Ngipa	5,513	70.75	▼1.13
Independent	Ridi Bauk	1,656	21.25	▲21.25
PKR	Nicholas Bawin Anggat	532	6.83	▼9.52
Independent	Adan Sandom	91	1.17	▲1.17
Total valid votes		7,792	100.00	
Total rejected ballots		73		
Unreturned ballots		23		
Turnout		7,888	73.84	▲0.50
Registered electors		10,682		
Majority		3,857	49.50	▼6.03
BN hold		Swing		
Source(s) "Federal Government Gazette - Notice of Contested Election, State Legislative Assembly of the State of Sarawak [P.U. (B) 190/2016]" (PDF). Attorney General's Chambers of Malaysia. 25 April 2016. Archived from the original (PDF) on 2017-06-12. "Senarai Calon yang Disahkan Layak Bertanding Pilihan Raya Dewan Undangan Negeri ke-11". Election Commission of Malaysia. 25 April 2016. Archived from the original on 25 April 2016.

Sarawak state election, 2011
Party	Candidate	Votes	%	∆%
BN	Johnical Rayong Ngipa	4,928	71.88	▲25.18
PKR	Marudi @ Barudi Mawong	1,121	16.35	▲16.35
Independent	Jimmy Simon Maja	414	6.04	▲6.04
SNAP	Semijie Janting	393	5.73	▼47.57
Total valid votes		6,856	100.00	
Total rejected ballots		70		
Unreturned ballots		0		
Turnout		6,926	73.34	▲4.57
Registered electors		9,444		
Majority		3,807	55.53	▲48.93
BN gain from SNAP		Swing		?
Source(s) "Federal Government Gazette - Results of Contested Election and Statements of the Poll after the Official Addition of Votes Sarawak [P.U. (B) 245/2011]" (PDF). Attorney General's Chambers of Malaysia. 29 April 2011.

Sarawak state election, 2006
Party	Candidate	Votes	%	∆%
SNAP	Johnical Rayong Ngipa	3,442	53.30	▲53.30
BN	Jonathan Krai Pilo	3,016	46.70	▼7.46
Total valid votes		6,458	100.00	
Total rejected ballots		56		
Unreturned ballots		4		
Turnout		6,518	68.77	▼2.11
Registered electors		9,477		
Majority		426	6.60	▼4.40
SNAP gain from BN		Swing		?

Sarawak state election, 2001
Party	Candidate	Votes	%	∆%
BN	Toh Heng San	3,485	54.16	▲3.51
Independent	Johnical Rayong Ngipa	2,777	43.15	▲43.15
PKR	Norazman Abdullah @ Beginda	173	2.69	▲2.69
Total valid votes		6,435	100.00	
Total rejected ballots		72		
Unreturned ballots		5		
Turnout		6,512	70.88	▼2.73
Registered electors		9,187		
Majority		708	11.00	▲4.99
BN hold		Swing		

Sarawak state election, 1996
Party	Candidate	Votes	%	∆%
BN	Toh Heng San	3,152	50.65	▼1.47
Independent	Sung Cho Nang @ Sim Choo Nam	2,778	44.64	▼0.93
Independent	Serit Kunchau	187	3.00	▲3.00
Independent	Sanggong Bungu	106	1.70	▲1.70
Total valid votes		6,223	100.00	
Total rejected ballots		87		
Unreturned ballots		7		
Turnout		6,317	73.61	▼2.59
Registered electors		8,582		
Majority		374	6.01	▼0.53
BN hold		Swing		

Sarawak state election, 1991
Party	Candidate	Votes	%	∆%
BN	Toh Heng San	3,227	52.12	▲17.19
PBDS	Sung Cho Nang @ Sim Choo Nam	2,822	45.57	▼19.50
NEGARA	Engkamat Nanang	143	2.31	▲2.31
Total valid votes		6,192	100.00	
Total rejected ballots		57		
Unreturned ballots		6		
Turnout		6,255	76.20	▼5.63
Registered electors		8,209		
Majority		405	6.54	▼23.59
BN gain from PBDS		Swing		?

Sarawak state election, 1987
Party	Candidate	Votes	%	∆%
PBDS	Sung Cho Nang @ Sim Choo Nam	3,839	65.07	▲65.07
BN	Intal Rentap	2,061	34.93	▼32.66
Total valid votes		5,900	100.00	
Total rejected ballots		141		
Unreturned ballots		0		
Turnout		6,041	81.83	
Registered electors		7,382		
Majority		1,778	30.14	
PBDS gain from Independent		Swing		?

Sarawak state election, 1983
Party	Candidate	Votes	%	∆%
Independent	Sung Cho Nang @ Sim Choo Nam			
BN	Simon Dembab Maja			
Total valid votes			100.00	
Total rejected ballots				
Unreturned ballots				
Turnout				
Registered electors				
Majority				
Independent gain from BN		Swing		?

Sarawak state by-election, 4–5 September 1981 Upon the death of incumbent, Nadeng Linggoh
Party	Candidate	Votes	%	∆%
BN	Jonathan Narwin	2,536	67.59	
Independent	Entau Mengga	1,216	32.41	
Total valid votes		3,752	100.00	
Total rejected ballots		108		
Unreturned ballots		0		
Turnout		3,860	63.34	
Registered electors		6,094		
Majority		1,320	35.18	
BN hold		Swing		

Sarawak state election, 1979
Party	Candidate	Votes	%
BN	Nadeng Linggoh	2,583	60.68
Independent	Luta Majeng	1,674	39.32
Total valid votes		4,257	100.00
Total rejected ballots		124	
Unreturned ballots		0	
Turnout		4,381	73.62
Registered electors		5,951	
Majority		909	21.35
This was a new constituency created.
