= James Dawos Mamit =

Malaysian politician (1948–2019)

Yang Berbahagia Dato' Sri James Dawos Mamit SSAP PSBS

Deputy Minister of Energy, Green Technology and Water
- In office 29 July 2015 – 9 May 2018
- Monarchs: Abdul Halim; Muhammad V
- Prime Minister: Najib Razak
- Minister: Maximus Ongkili
- Preceded by: Mahdzir Khalid
- Succeeded by: Isnaraissah Munirah Majilis (Energy); Tengku Zulpuri Shah Raja Puji (Water)
- Constituency: Mambong

Deputy Minister of Natural Resources and Environment
- In office 16 May 2013 – 29 July 2015
- Monarch: Abdul Halim
- Prime Minister: Najib Razak
- Minister: Palanivel Govindasamy
- Preceded by: Joseph Kurup
- Succeeded by: Hamim Samuri
- Constituency: Mambong

Deputy Minister of Tourism
- In office 14 December 2009 – 15 May 2013
- Monarchs: Mizan Zainal Abidin; Abdul Halim
- Prime Minister: Najib Razak
- Minister: Ng Yen Yen
- Preceded by: Sulaiman Abdul Rahman Taib
- Succeeded by: Mas Ermieyati Samsudin as Deputy Minister of Tourism and Culture
- Constituency: Mambong

Member of the Malaysian Parliament for Mambong (currently Puncak Borneo)
- In office 29 November 1999 – 9 May 2018
- Preceded by: Constituency established
- Succeeded by: Willie Mongin (PH–PKR)
- Majority: 1,672 (1999); 9,098 (2004); 6,657 (2008); 9,721 (2013)

Personal details
- Born: 4 November 1948 Crown Colony of Sarawak
- Died: 9 July 2019 (aged 70) Kuching, Sarawak
- Party: Parti Pesaka Bumiputera Bersatu (PBB)
- Other political affiliations: Barisan Nasional (BN)
- Spouse: Christine Dawung Narub
- Occupation: Politician

James Dawos Mamit (4 November 1948 – 9 July 2019) was a Malaysian politician. He was the Member of Parliament of Malaysia for the Mambong constituency in Sarawak, representing the United Traditional Bumiputera Party (PBB). He was also the former Deputy Minister of Energy, Green Technology and Water in the Barisan Nasional coalition government.

Dawos was appointed as Deputy Minister of Tourism on 14 December 2009, replacing Sulaiman Abdul Rahman Taib. As a backbencher, he had promoted the preservation of Bidayuh language and culture.

On 16 May 2013, after his victory in the 13th General Election, he was appointed as Deputy Minister of Natural Resources and Environment.

== Election results ==
Parliament of Malaysia
Year	Constituency	Candidate	Votes	Pct	Opponent(s)	Votes	Pct	Ballots cast	Majority	Turnout
1999	P172 Mambong	James Dawos Mamit (PBB)	11,327	53.98%	Jerip Susil (STAR)	9,655	46.02%	21,563	1,672	64.89%
2004	P198 Mambong	James Dawos Mamit (PBB)	15,368	71.02%	Mangan Ngandok (STAR)	6,270	28.98%	22,089	9,098	61.96%
2008	P198 Mambong	James Dawos Mamit (PBB)	14,182	65.33%	Majen Panyog (PKR)	7,525	34.67%	22,306	6,657	61.71%
2013	P198 Mambong	James Dawos Mamit (PBB)	20,461	64.13%	Willie Mongin (PKR)	10,740	33.66%	32,695	9,721	77.21%
2013	P198 Mambong	James Dawos Mamit (PBB)	20,461	64.13%	Dripin Sakoi (STAR)	704	2.21%	32,695	9,721	77.21%

== Honours ==
- Pahang
  - Knight Grand Companion of the Order of Sultan Ahmad Shah of Pahang (SSAP) – Dato' Sri (2012)
- Sarawak
  - Commander of the Most Exalted Order of the Star of Sarawak (PSBS) – Dato (2006)
