= Johnical Rayong Ngipa =

Malaysian politician

Yang Berhormat Johnical Rayong Ngipa MLA

Member of the Sarawak State Legislative Assembly for Engkilili
- Incumbent
- Assumed office 2006
- Preceded by: Toh Heng San

Personal details
- Born: Johnical Rayong anak Ngipa Sarawak
- Citizenship: Malaysian
- Party: SNAP (till 2011); SUPP (2011-2014); PSB (2014-2024); PDP (since 2024)
- Other political affiliations: Barisan Nasional (till 2014, 2016); Gabungan Parti Sarawak (since 2024)
- Occupation: Politician

Johnical Rayong anak Ngipa is a Malaysian politician from PDP. He has served as the Member of the Sarawak State Legislative Assembly for Engkilili since 2006.

== Political career ==
Johnical is one of the Vice President of PDP. He was also one of the founders of PSB and served as Deputy President.

== Election results ==
Parliament of Malaysia
| Year | Constituency | Candidate | Votes | Pct. | Opponent(s) | Votes | Pct. | Ballots cast | Majority | Turnout |
|---|---|---|---|---|---|---|---|---|---|---|
| 2022 | P203 Lubok Antu | Johnical Rayong Ngipa (PSB) | 6,544 | 33.92% | Roy Angau Gingkoi (PRS) | 6,644 | 34.44% | 19,294 | 100 | 66.54% |
| 2022 | P203 Lubok Antu | Johnical Rayong Ngipa (PSB) | 6,544 | 33.92% | Jugah Muyang (BERSATU) | 5,360 | 27.78% | 19,294 | 100 | 66.54% |
| 2022 | P203 Lubok Antu | Johnical Rayong Ngipa (PSB) | 6,544 | 33.92% | Langga Lias (PKR) | 746 | 3.87% | 19,294 | 100 | 66.54% |

Sarawak State Legislative Assembly
| Year | Constituency | Candidate | Votes | Pct. | Opponent(s) | Votes | Pct. | Ballots cast | Majority | Turnout |
|---|---|---|---|---|---|---|---|---|---|---|
| 2001 | N24 Engkilili | Johnical Rayong Ngipa (IND) | 2,777 | 43.15% | Toh Heng San (SUPP) | 3,485 | 54.16% | 6,512 | 708 | 70.88% |
| 2001 | N24 Engkilili | Johnical Rayong Ngipa (IND) | 2,777 | 43.15% | Norazman Abdullah @ Beginda (PKR) | 173 | 2.69% | 6,512 | 708 | 70.88% |
| 2006 | N28 Engkilili | Johnical Rayong Ngipa (SNAP) | 3,442 | 53.30% | Jonathan Krai Pilo (SUPP) | 3,016 | 46.70% | 6,518 | 426 | 68.77% |
| 2011 | N28 Engkilili | Johnical Rayong Ngipa (SUPP) | 4,928 | 71.88% | Marudi @ Barudi Mawong (PKR) | 1,121 | 16.35% | 6,926 | 3,807 | 73.34% |
| 2011 | N28 Engkilili | Johnical Rayong Ngipa (SUPP) | 4,928 | 71.88% | Jimmy Simon Maja (IND) | 414 | 6.04% | 6,926 | 3,807 | 73.34% |
| 2011 | N28 Engkilili | Johnical Rayong Ngipa (SUPP) | 4,928 | 71.88% | Semijie Janting (SNAP) | 393 | 5.73% | 6,926 | 3,807 | 73.34% |
| 2016 | N33 Engkilili | Johnical Rayong Ngipa (BN Direct) | 5,513 | 70.75% | Ridi Bauk (IND) | 1,656 | 21.25% | 7,888 | 3,857 | 73.84% |
| 2016 | N33 Engkilili | Johnical Rayong Ngipa (BN Direct) | 5,513 | 70.75% | Nicholas Bawin Anggat (PKR) | 532 | 6.83% | 7,888 | 3,857 | 73.84% |
| 2016 | N33 Engkilili | Johnical Rayong Ngipa (BN Direct) | 5,513 | 70.75% | Adan Sandom (IND) | 91 | 1.17% | 7,888 | 3,857 | 73.84% |
| 2021 | N33 Engkilili | Johnical Rayong Ngipa (PSB) | 3,246 | 43.48% | Desmond Sateng Sanjan (SUPP) | 2,055 | 27.53% | 7,563 | 1,191 | 68.51% |
| 2021 | N33 Engkilili | Johnical Rayong Ngipa (PSB) | 3,246 | 43.48% | Stel Datu (PBK) | 2,013 | 26.97% | 7,563 | 1,191 | 68.51% |
| 2021 | N33 Engkilili | Johnical Rayong Ngipa (PSB) | 3,246 | 43.48% | Gemong Batu (IND) | 151 | 2.02% | 7,563 | 1,191 | 68.51% |
