= Bengoh =

Sarawak constituency

Defunct state constituency
- Legislature: Sarawak State Legislative Assembly
- Constituency created: 1968
- Constituency abolished: 2016
- First contested: 1969
- Last contested: 2011

Bengoh was a state constituency in Sarawak, Malaysia, that was represented in the Sarawak State Legislative Assembly from 1969 to 2016.

The state constituency was created in the 1968 redistribution and was mandated to return a single member to the Sarawak State Legislative Assembly under the first past the post voting system.

== History ==
It was abolished in 2016 after it was redistributed.

=== Representation history ===
Members of the Legislative Assembly for Bengoh
Assembly	No	Years	Member	Party
Constituency created
8th	N10	1970-1973	Segus Ginyai	SUPP
8th	N10	1973-1974	Segus Ginyai	BN (SUPP)
9th	N10	1974–1979	Segus Ginyai	BN (SUPP)
10th	N10	1979-1982	Stephen Yong Kuet Tze (杨国斯)	BN (SUPP)
10th	N10	1982-1983	William Tanyuh Nub	BN (SUPP)
11th	N10	1983-1987	Wilfred Rata Nissom	Independent
12th	N10	1987-1991	Sora Rusah	PBDS
13th	N11	1991-1996	William Tanyuh Nub	BN (SUPP)
14th	N14	1996–2001	William Tanyuh Nub	BN (SUPP)
15th	N14	2001-2006	Jerip Susil	BN (SUPP)
16th	N16	2006–2011	Jerip Susil	BN (SUPP)
17th	N16	2011–2014	Jerip Susil	BN (SUPP)
17th	N16	2014	Jerip Susil	TERAS
17th	N16	2014-2016	Jerip Susil	UPP
Constituency abolished, renamed to Mambong

== Election results ==
Sarawak state election, 2011: Bengoh
Party	Candidate	Votes	%	∆%
BN	Jerip Susil	8,093	55.91	▼12.07
PKR	Willie Mongin	4,447	30.72	▲30.72
Independent	Wejok Tomik	1,007	6.96	▲6.96
SNAP	Richard @ Peter Margaret	928	6.41	▼25.61
Total valid votes		14,475	100.00	
Total rejected ballots		275		
Unreturned ballots		80		
Turnout		14,830	67.55	▲10.65
Registered electors		21,955		
Majority		3,646	25.19	▼10.77
BN hold		Swing		{{{2}}}
Source(s) "Federal Government Gazette - Results of Contested Election and Statements of the Poll after the Official Addition of Votes Sarawak [P.U. (B) 245/2011]" (PDF). Attorney General's Chambers of Malaysia. 29 April 2011.

Sarawak state election, 2006: Bengoh
Party	Candidate	Votes	%	∆%
BN	Jerip Susil	7,540	67.98	▲4.45
SNAP	Mangan Ngandok	3,552	32.02	▲32.02
Total valid votes		11,092	100.00	
Total rejected ballots		198		
Unreturned ballots		134		
Turnout		11,424	56.90	▼10.90
Registered electors		20,077		
Majority		3,988	35.95	▲8.89
BN hold		Swing		{{{2}}}

Sarawak state election, 2001: Bengoh
Party	Candidate	Votes	%	∆%
BN	Jerip Susil	8,027	63.53	▲9.61
STAR	Patau Rubis	4,608	36.47	▲36.47
Total valid votes		12,635	100.00	
Total rejected ballots		183		
Unreturned ballots		245		
Turnout		13,063	67.80	▼0.43
Registered electors		19,266		
Majority		3,419	27.06	▲14.70
BN hold		Swing		{{{2}}}

Sarawak state election, 1996: Bengoh
Party	Candidate	Votes	%	∆%
BN	William Tanyuh Nub	6,312	53.92	▲5.05
Independent	Jerip Susil	4,865	41.56	▲39.48
Independent	Wilfred Ahmin Gumung	348	2.97	▲0.90
BEBAS	Akaw anak Nonjep	181	1.55	▼0.53
Total valid votes		11,706	100.00	
Total rejected ballots		212		
Unreturned ballots		51		
Turnout		11,969	68.24	▼4.44
Registered electors		17,540		
Majority		1,447	12.36	▲10.76
BN hold		Swing		{{{2}}}

Sarawak state election, 1991: Bengoh
Party	Candidate	Votes	%	∆%
BN	William Tanyuh Nub	6,477	48.87	▲0.86
PBDS	Wilfred Rata Nissom	6,265	47.27	▼2.68
Independent	Johnie Chai @ Sasim	275	2.08	▲0.04
NEGARA	George Si Rocord	236	1.78	▲1.78
Total valid votes		13,253	100.00	
Total rejected ballots		204		
Unreturned ballots		46		
Turnout		13,503	72.68	▼3.70
Registered electors		18,578		
Majority		212	1.60	▼0.34
BN gain from PBDS		Swing		?

Sarawak state election, 1987: Bengoh
Party	Candidate	Votes	%	∆%
PBDS	Sora Rusah	5,648	49.95	▲49.95
BN	Louis Gines	5,429	48.01	▲3.88
Independent	Robert Abui	230	2.03	▲1.11
Total valid votes		11,307	100.00	
Total rejected ballots		166		
Unreturned ballots		0		
Turnout		11,473	76.38	▼4.05
Registered electors		15,021		
Majority		219	1.94	▼8.88
PBDS gain from Independent		Swing		?

Sarawak state election, 1983: Bengoh
Party	Candidate	Votes	%	∆%
Independent	Wilfred Rata Nissom	5,720	54.95	▲7.95
BN	William Tanyuh Nub	4,594	44.13	▼8.88
Independent	George Siricord	96	0.92	▼46.07
Total valid votes		10,410	100.00	
Total rejected ballots		133		
Unreturned ballots		0		
Turnout		10,543	80.43	▲13.18
Registered electors		13,108		
Majority		1,126	10.82	▲4.80
Independent gain from BN		Swing		?

Sarawak state by-election, 14 August 1982: Bengoh Upon the resignation of incumbent, Stephen Yong Kuet Tze
Party	Candidate	Votes	%	∆%
BN	William Tanyuh Nub	4,195	53.01	▲2.63
Independent	Chong Kuet Bui @ Robert Abui	3,719	46.99	▼0.68
Total valid votes		7,914	100.00	
Total rejected ballots		199		
Unreturned ballots		0		
Turnout		8,113	67.26	▼17.79
Registered electors		12,063		
Majority		476	6.01	▲3.31
BN hold		Swing		?
Source(s) "Barisan retains Bengoh seat". New Straits Times. 15 August 1982. p. 1.

Sarawak state election, 1979: Bengoh
Party	Candidate	Votes	%	∆%
BN	Stephen Yong Kuet Tze	4,115	50.38	▼2.08
Independent	Wilfred Rata Nissom	3,894	47.67	▲43.02
DAP	Shyu Li Hua	159	1.95	▲1.95
Total valid votes		8,168	100.00	
Total rejected ballots		115		
Unreturned ballots		0		
Turnout		8,283	85.04	▼2.10
Registered electors		9,740		
Majority		221	2.71	▼6.86
BN hold		Swing		{{{2}}}

Sarawak state election, 1974: Bengoh
Party	Candidate	Votes	%	∆%
BN	Segus Ginyai	2,286	52.46	▲10.56
SNAP	Bernabas Kulur Kaos	1,869	42.89	▲7.15
Parti Bisamah Sarawak	William Nais	203	4.66	▼0.71
Total valid votes		4,358	100.00	
Total rejected ballots		503		
Unreturned ballots		0		
Turnout		4,861	87.15	▼0.97
Registered electors		5,578		
Majority		417	9.57	▲3.41
BN gain from SUPP		Swing		?

Sarawak state by-election, 30 July 1970: Bengoh
Party	Candidate	Votes	%
SUPP	Segus Ginyai	1,796	41.89
SNAP	Akui Asu	1,532	35.74
PESAKA	George Siricord	498	11.62
PBB	Mohamed Bakeri	231	5.39
Independent	William Nais	230	5.37
Total valid votes		4,287	100.00
Total rejected ballots		116	
Unreturned ballots		0	
Turnout		4,403	88.11
Registered electors		4,997	
Majority		264	6.16
This was a new constituency created.
