= Jerip Susil =

Malaysian politician

Yang Berhormat Datuk Jerip Susil MLA PGBK AMN

Deputy Minister for Transport
- Incumbent
- Assumed office 2022 Serving with Henry Harry Jinep
- Governor: Abdul Taib Mahmud (2022-2024); Wan Junaidi Tuanku Jaafar (since 2024)
- Premier: Abang Johari
- Preceded by: Position established

Member of the Sarawak State Legislative Assembly for Mambong
- Incumbent
- Assumed office 2016
- Preceded by: Constituency created

Member of the Sarawak State Legislative Assembly for Bengoh
- In office 2001–2016
- Preceded by: William Tanyuh Nub
- Succeeded by: Constituency abolished

Personal details
- Born: Jerip anak Susil; 28 April 1957 (age 69) Sarawak
- Citizenship: Malaysian
- Party: STAR (till 2001); SUPP (2001-2014); TERAS (2014); PSB (2014-2019); PBB (since 2019)
- Other political affiliations: Barisan Nasional (till 2014); Gabungan Parti Sarawak (since 2019)
- Occupation: Politician

Jerip anak Susil is a Malaysian politician from PBB. He has served as the Member of the Sarawak State Legislative Assembly for Mambong since 2011. He is also Deputy Minister for Transport for Sarawak.

== Political career ==
Jerip was the Deputy Secretary-General of STAR. He was also one of the founders of PSB and served as the Deputy President.

== Election results ==
Parliament of Malaysia
Year	Constituency	Candidate	Votes	Pct.	Opponent(s)	Votes	Pct.	Ballots cast	Majority	Turnout
1999	P172 Mambong	Jerip Susil (STAR)	9,655	46.02%	James Dawos Mamit (PBB)	11,327	53.98%	21,563	1,672	64.89%

Sarawak State Legislative Assembly
Year	Constituency	Candidate	Votes	Pct.	Opponent(s)	Votes	Pct.	Ballots cast	Majority	Turnout
1996	N14 Bengoh	Jerip Susil (IND)	4,865	41.56%	William Tanyuh Nub (SUPP)	6,312	53.92%	11,969	1,447	68.24%
1996	N14 Bengoh	Jerip Susil (IND)	4,865	41.56%	Wilfred Ahmin Gumung (IND)	348	2.97%	11,969	1,447	68.24%
1996	N14 Bengoh	Jerip Susil (IND)	4,865	41.56%	Akaw Nonjep (IND)	181	1.55%	11,969	1,447	68.24%
2001	N14 Bengoh	Jerip Susil (SUPP)	8,027	63.53%	Patau Rubis (STAR)	4,608	36.47%	13,063	3,419	67.80%
2006	N16 Bengoh	Jerip Susil (SUPP)	7,540	67.98%	Mangan Ngandok (SNAP)	3,552	32.02%	11,424	3,988	56.90%
2011	N16 Bengoh	Jerip Susil (SUPP)	8,093	55.91%	Willie Mongin (PKR)	4,447	30.72%	14,830	3,646	67.55%
2011	N16 Bengoh	Jerip Susil (SUPP)	8,093	55.91%	Wejok Tomik (IND)	1,007	6.96%	14,830	3,646	67.55%
2011	N16 Bengoh	Jerip Susil (SUPP)	8,093	55.91%	Richard @ Peter Margaret (SNAP)	928	6.41%	14,830	3,646	67.55%
2016	N19 Mambong	Jerip Susil (BN Direct)	6,161	52.96%	Sanjan Daik (DAP)	2,828	24.31%	11,904	3,333	68.15%
2016	N19 Mambong	Jerip Susil (BN Direct)	6,161	52.96%	Willie Mongin (PKR)	2,645	22.74%	11,904	3,333	68.15%
2021	N19 Mambong	Jerip Susil (PBB)	5,865	52.00%	Sanjan Daik (PSB)	2,794	24.77%	11,482	3,071	59.45%
2021	N19 Mambong	Jerip Susil (PBB)	5,865	52.00%	Chang Hon Hiung (DAP)	1,517	13.45%	11,482	3,071	59.45%
2021	N19 Mambong	Jerip Susil (PBB)	5,865	52.00%	Joshua Roman (PBK)	958	8.49%	11,482	3,071	59.45%
2021	N19 Mambong	Jerip Susil (PBB)	5,865	52.00%	Chong Siew Hung (ASPIRASI)	144	1.28%	11,482	3,071	59.45%

== Honours ==
- Malaysia :
  - Member of the Order of the Defender of the Realm (AMN) (2006)
- Sarawak :
  - Commander of the Order of the Star of Hornbill Sarawak (PGBK) – Datuk (2013)
