= Mambong (federal constituency) =

Sarawak constituency

Defunct federal constituency
- Legislature: Dewan Rakyat
- Constituency created: 1996
- Constituency abolished: 2018
- First contested: 1999
- Last contested: 2013

Mambong was a federal constituency in Sarawak, Malaysia, that was represented in the Dewan Rakyat from 1999 to 2018.

The federal constituency was created in the 1996 redistribution and was mandated to return a single member to the Dewan Rakyat under the first past the post voting system.

== History ==
It was abolished in 2016 when it was redistributed

=== Representation history ===
Members of Parliament for Mambong
Parliament	No	Years	Member	Party	Vote Share
Constituency created from Mas Gading, Padawan and Serian
10th	P172	1999-2004	James Dawos Mamit	BN (PBB)	11,327; 53.98%
11th	P198	2004-2008	James Dawos Mamit	BN (PBB)	15,367; 71.02%
12th	P198	2008-2013	James Dawos Mamit	BN (PBB)	14,182; 65.33%
13th	P198	2013-2018	James Dawos Mamit	BN (PBB)	20,461; 64.13%
Constituency abolished, renamed to Puncak Borneo

=== State constituency ===
Parliamentary constituency	State constituency					
Parliamentary constituency	1969–1978	1978–1990	1990–1999	1999–2008	2008–2016	2016−present
Mambong				Bengoh		
Mambong				Tarat		

=== Historical boundaries ===
State Constituency	Area	
State Constituency	1996	2005
Bengoh	Bengoh; Kampung Peninjau; Pangkalan Tebang; Siburan; Siniawan	
Tarat	Baki Lama; Beratok; Kampung Sira; Tarat; Teng Bukap	

== Election results ==
Malaysian general election, 2013
Party	Candidate	Votes	%	∆%
BN	James Dawos Mamit	20,461	64.13	▼1.20
PKR	Willie Mongin	10,740	33.66	▼1.01
STAR	Dripin Sakoi	704	2.21	▲2.21
Total valid votes		31,905	100.00	
Total rejected ballots		674		
Unreturned ballots		116		
Turnout		32,695	77.21	▲15.50
Registered electors		42,344		
Majority		9,721	30.47	▼0.19
BN hold		Swing		
Source(s) "Federal Government Gazette - Notice of Contested Election, Parliament for the State of Sarawak [P.U. (B) 184/2013]" (PDF). Attorney General's Chambers of Malaysia. 26 April 2013. Archived from the original (PDF) on 30 September 2018. "Federal Government Gazette - Results of Contested Election and Statements of the Poll after the Official Addition of Votes, Parliamentary Constituencies for the State of Sarawak [P.U. (B) 225/2013]" (PDF). Attorney General's Chambers of Malaysia. 22 May 2013. Archived from the original (PDF) on 30 September 2018.

Malaysian general election, 2008
Party	Candidate	Votes	%	∆%
BN	James Dawos Mamit	14,182	65.33	▼5.69
PKR	Majen Panyog	7,525	34.67	▲34.67
Total valid votes		21,707	100.00	
Total rejected ballots		473		
Unreturned ballots		126		
Turnout		22,306	61.71	▼0.25
Registered electors		36,147		
Majority		6,657	30.66	▼11.38
BN hold		Swing		

Malaysian general election, 2004
Party	Candidate	Votes	%	∆%
BN	James Dawos Mamit	15,368	71.02	▲17.04
STAR	Mangan Ngandok	6,270	28.98	▼17.04
Total valid votes		21,638	100.00	
Total rejected ballots		451		
Unreturned ballots				
Turnout		22,089	61.96	▼2.93
Registered electors				
Majority		9,098	42.04	▲34.08
BN hold		Swing		

Malaysian general election, 1999
Party	Candidate	Votes	%
BN	James Dawos Mamit	11,327	53.98
STAR	Jerip Susil	9,655	46.02
Total valid votes		20,982	100.00
Total rejected ballots		500	
Unreturned ballots		81	
Turnout		21,563	64.89
Registered electors			
Majority		1,672	7.96
This was a new constituency created.
