= Batang Ai =

State constituency in Sarawak, Malaysia

Batang Ai (N34)
Sarawak constituency

State constituency
- Legislature: Sarawak State Legislative Assembly
MLA
Vacant
- Constituency created: 1977
- First contested: 1979
- Last contested: 2026

Batang Ai is a state constituency in Sarawak, Malaysia, that has been represented in the Sarawak State Legislative Assembly since 1979.

The state constituency was created in the 1977 redistribution and is mandated to return a single member to the Sarawak State Legislative Assembly under the first past the post voting system.

== Demographics ==
Ethnic breakdown of Batang Ai's electorate as of 2022
1. Sarawak bumiputera (93.9%)
2. Chinese (3.40%)
3. Malay-Muslim bumiputera (2.00%)
4. Other ethnicities (0.70%)

== History ==
As of 2020, Batang Ai has a population of 12,597 people.

=== Polling districts ===
According to the gazette issued on 31 October 2022, the Batang Ai constituency has a total of 24 polling districts.

State constituency	Polling Districts	Code	Location
Batang Ai (N34)	Sebangki	203/34/01	SK Sebangki
Batang Ai (N34)	Lubok Antu	203/34/02	SMK Lubok Antu
Batang Ai (N34)	Sekarok	203/34/03	SK Sekarok
Batang Ai (N34)	Kesit	203/34/04	SK Ng. Kesit; RH Limpeng Lepong Mawang Kesit
Batang Ai (N34)	Engkari	203/34/05	SK Ulu Engkari
Batang Ai (N34)	Delok	203/34/06	SK Ng. Delok Lubok Antu
Batang Ai (N34)	Kaong	203/34/07	Tadika KEMAS Kaong Ulu; Pusat Sumber Nyemungan Simpang
Batang Ai (N34)	Empit	203/34/08	SK Melaban Empit
Batang Ai (N34)	Kumpang	203/34/09	SK Ng. Aup
Batang Ai (N34)	Klampu	203/34/10	RH Renggie
Batang Ai (N34)	Sayat	203/34/11	SK Ng. Kumpang
Batang Ai (N34)	Kutai	203/34/12	SK Lubok Antu
Batang Ai (N34)	Mepi	203/34/13	SK Batang Ai
Batang Ai (N34)	Jela	203/34/14	Tadika KEMAS Ng. Jela; Ng Telaus Sps
Batang Ai (N34)	Sempang	203/34/15	Tadika KEMAS Sempang
Batang Ai (N34)	Bertik	203/34/16	Dewan Seberguna SALCRA SPS Batang Ai
Batang Ai (N34)	Krangan Mong	203/34/17	Tadika Kemas Krangan Mong
Batang Ai (N34)	Ensawang	203/34/18	Dewan Seberguna SALCRA Skim Batu Kaya
Batang Ai (N34)	Kachong	203/34/19	SK Ng. Menyebat
Batang Ai (N34)	Patoh	203/34/20	RH Jeli; RH Bakar
Batang Ai (N34)	Bilarap	203/34/21	SK Ulu Lemanak Ng. Uyau
Batang Ai (N34)	Sepata	203/34/22	SK Ng. Tibu
Batang Ai (N34)	Gugu	203/34/23	RH Intang Mengiling
Batang Ai (N34)	Nenyang	203/34/24	SESCO Township Hall

=== Representation history ===
Members of the Legislative Assembly for Batang Ai
Assembly	No	Years	Member	Party
Constituency renamed from Ulu Ai
Batang Air
10th	N18	1979-1982	David Jemut	BN (SNAP)
10th	N18	1982-1983	Mikai Mandau	Independent
11th	N18	1983-1986	Sylvester Langit Uming	SNAP
11th	N18	1986-1987	Mikai Mandau	Independent
12th	N18	1987-1991	Mikai Mandau	PBDS
13th	N23	1991-1996	Dublin Unting Ingkot	PBDS
14th	N25	1996-2001	Dublin Unting Ingkot	BN (PBDS)
15th	N25	2001-2004	Dublin Unting Ingkot	BN (PBDS)
15th	N25	2004-2006	Dublin Unting Ingkot	BN (PRS)
16th	N29	2006-2009	Dublin Unting Ingkot	BN (PRS)
16th	N29	2009-2011	Malcom Mussen Lamoh	BN (PRS)
17th	N29	2011-2016	Malcom Mussen Lamoh	BN (PRS)
Batang Ai
18th	N34	2016-2018	Malcom Mussen Lamoh	BN (PRS)
18th	N34	2018-2021	Malcom Mussen Lamoh	GPS (PRS)
19th	N34	2021–2026	Malcom Mussen Lamoh	GPS (PRS)

== Election results ==
Sarawak state election, 2026: Batang Ai
Party	Candidate	Votes	%	∆%
GPS				▲
PH				▲
Total valid votes				
Total rejected ballots				
Unreturned ballots				
Turnout				
Registered electors				
Majority				

Sarawak state election, 2021: Batang Ai
Party	Candidate	Votes	%	∆%
GPS	Malcom Mussen Lamoh	3,208	44.59	▲44.59
Independent	John Linang Mereejon	2,470	34.33	▲34.33
PSB	William Nyallau Badak	1,366	18.99	▲18.99
PBK	Usup Asun	151	2.10	▲2.10
Total valid votes		7,195	100.00	
Total rejected ballots		68		
Unreturned ballots		14		
Turnout		7,277	73.29	▲2.54
Registered electors		9,929		
Majority		738	10.26	▼38.14
GPS gain from BN		Swing		?
Source(s) https://lom.agc.gov.my/ilims/upload/portal/akta/outputp/1718688/PUB687.pdf

Sarawak state election, 2016: Batang Ai
Party	Candidate	Votes	%	∆%
BN	Malcom Mussen Lamoh	4,884	74.20	▲2.02
PKR	Kolien Liong	1,698	25.80	▼2.02
Total valid votes		6,582	100.00	
Total rejected ballots		116		
Unreturned ballots		18		
Turnout		6,716	70.75	▼1.21
Registered electors		9,492		
Majority		3,186	48.40	▲4.04
BN hold		Swing		
Source(s) "Federal Government Gazette - Notice of Contested Election, State Legislative Assembly of the State of Sarawak [P.U. (B) 190/2016]" (PDF). Attorney General's Chambers of Malaysia. 25 April 2016. Archived from the original (PDF) on 12 June 2017. "Senarai Calon yang Disahkan Layak Bertanding Pilihan Raya Dewan Undangan Negeri ke-11". Election Commission of Malaysia. 25 April 2016. Archived from the original on 25 April 2016.

Sarawak state election, 2011: Batang Ai
Party	Candidate	Votes	%	∆%
BN	Malcom Mussen Lamoh	4,460	72.18	▲6.63
PKR	Nicholas Bawin Anggat	1,719	27.82	▼6.63
Total valid votes		6,179	100.00	
Total rejected ballots		83		
Unreturned ballots		19		
Turnout		6,281	71.96	▼3.36
Registered electors		8,728		
Majority		2,741	44.36	▲13.25
BN hold		Swing		
Source(s) "Federal Government Gazette - Results of Contested Election and Statements of the Poll after the Official Addition of Votes Sarawak [P.U. (B) 245/2011]" (PDF). Attorney General's Chambers of Malaysia. 29 April 2011.

Sarawak state by-election, 7 April 2009: Batang Ai Upon the death of incumbent, Dublin Unting Ingkot
Party	Candidate	Votes	%	∆%
BN	Malcom Mussen Lamoh	3,907	65.55	▲8.58
PKR	Jawah Gerang	2,053	34.45	▲34.45
Total valid votes		5,960	100.00	
Total rejected ballots		59		
Unreturned ballots		11		
Turnout		6,030	75.32	
Registered electors		8,006		
Majority		1,854	31.11	
BN hold		Swing		
Source(s) "Pilihan Raya Kecil N.29 Batang Air". Election Commission of Malaysia.

Sarawak state election, 2006: Batang Ai
Party	Candidate	Votes	%	∆%
BN	Dublin Unting Ingkot	3,295	56.97	▲56.97
SNAP	Nicholas Bawin Anggat	2,489	43.03	▲43.03
Total valid votes		5,784	100.00	
Total rejected ballots		70		
Unreturned ballots		10		
Turnout		5,864	73.32	
Registered electors		7,997		
Majority		806	13.94	
BN hold		Swing		

Sarawak state election, 2001: Batang Ai
Party	Candidate	Votes	%	∆%
On the nomination day, Dublin Unting Ingkot won uncontested.
BN	Dublin Unting Ingkot			
Total valid votes			100.00	
Total rejected ballots				
Unreturned ballots				
Turnout				
Registered electors		7,817		
Majority				
BN hold		Swing		

Sarawak state election, 1996: Batang Ai
Party	Candidate	Votes	%	∆%
BN	Dublin Unting Ingkot	3,882	74.52	▲25.34
Independent	Klinsing Manau	1,327	25.48	▲25.48
Total valid votes		5,209	100.00	
Total rejected ballots		100		
Unreturned ballots		4		
Turnout		5,313	74.99	
Registered electors		7,084		
Majority		2,555	49.05	▲47.40
BN gain from PBDS		Swing		?

Sarawak state election, 1991: Batang Ai
Party	Candidate	Votes	%	∆%
PBDS	Dublin Unting Ingkot	2,558	50.82	▼6.93
BN	Mikai Mandau	2,475	49.18	▲6.93
Total valid votes		5,033	100.00	
Total rejected ballots		85		
Unreturned ballots		5		
Turnout		5,123	77.20	
Registered electors		6,636		
Majority		83	1.65	▼13.85
PBDS hold		Swing		

Sarawak state election, 1987: Batang Ai
Party	Candidate	Votes	%	∆%
PBDS	Mikai Mandau	2,761	57.75	▲20.77
SNAP	Nicholas Bawin Anggat	2,020	42.25	▲5.27
Total valid votes		4,781	100.00	
Total rejected ballots		29		
Unreturned ballots		0		
Turnout		4,810	77.82	
Registered electors		6,181		
Majority		741	15.50	▲15.29
PBDS gain from SNAP		Swing		?

Sarawak state by-election, 29–30 August 1986: Batang Ai Upon the death of incumbent, Sylvester Langit
Party	Candidate	Votes	%	∆%
Independent	Mikai Mandau	2,342	52.04	▲52.04
BN	Albert Klingsing Manau	1,939	43.09	▲43.09
Independent	Dakau Sutik	84	1.87	▲1.87
Independent	Pok Ungkut	59	1.31	▲1.31
Independent	Ronaldson Ranggau Basan	46	1.02	▲1.02
Independent	Lim Ah San	30	0.67	
Total valid votes		4,500	100.00	
Total rejected ballots		26		
Unreturned ballots		0		
Turnout		4,526	74.91	▲2.46
Registered electors		6,042		
Majority		403	8.96	▲8.75
Independent gain from BN		Swing		?

Sarawak state election, 1983: Batang Ai
Party	Candidate	Votes	%	∆%
SNAP	Sylvester Langit Uming	1,421	36.98	▲36.98
PBDS	David Jemut	1,413	36.77	▲36.77
Independent	Benedict Bujang Tembak	1,009	26.26	▲26.26
Total valid votes		3,843	100.00	
Total rejected ballots		80		
Unreturned ballots		0		
Turnout		3,923	72.45	
Registered electors		5,415		
Majority		8	0.21	
SNAP gain from Independent		Swing		?

Sarawak state election, 1979: Batang Ai
Party	Candidate	Votes	%	∆%
On the nomination day, David Jemut won uncontested.
BN	David Jemut			
Total valid votes			100.00	
Total rejected ballots				
Unreturned ballots				
Turnout				
Registered electors		4,957		
Majority				
This was a new constituency created.
