= Mambong (state constituency) =

State constituency in Sarawak, Malaysia

Mambong (N19)
Sarawak constituency

State constituency
- Legislature: Sarawak State Legislative Assembly
MLA
Vacant
- Constituency created: 2015
- First contested: 2016
- Last contested: 2026

Mambong is a state constituency in Sarawak, Malaysia, that has been represented in the Sarawak State Legislative Assembly since 2016.

The state constituency was created in the 2015 redistribution and is mandated to return a single member to the Sarawak State Legislative Assembly under the first past the post voting system.

== Demographics ==
Ethnic breakdown of Mambong's electorate as of 2022
1. Sarawak bumiputera (70.8%)
2. Chinese (23.8%)
3. Malay-Muslim bumiputera (4.50%)
4. Other ethnicities (0.90%)

== History ==
As of 2020, Mambong has a population of 38,228 people.

=== Polling districts ===
According to the gazette issued on 31 October 2022, the Mambong constituency has a total of 32 polling districts.

State constituency	Polling Districts	Code	Location
Mambong (N19)	Mambong	198/19/01	Balai Raya Kpg. Mambong
Mambong (N19)	Siburan	198/19/02	SJK (C) Chung Hua Siburan
Mambong (N19)	Braang	198/19/03	Dewan Serbaguna Kpg. Bara'ang Payang; Balai Raya Kpg Bra'ang Sigandar
Mambong (N19)	Duras	198/19/04	Balai Raya Kpg. Duras
Mambong (N19)	Pulasar	198/19/05	SJK (C) Chung Hua Batu 15
Mambong (N19)	Nyiru	198/19/06	SK St. Gile
Mambong (N19)	Giam	198/19/07	Dewan Serbaguna Kpg. Giam Baru
Mambong (N19)	Sikog	198/19/08	Balai Raya Kpg. Sikog
Mambong (N19)	Staang	198/19/09	Balai Raya Kpg. Staang
Mambong (N19)	Petag	198/19/10	SK Staang Petag
Mambong (N19)	Bayor	198/19/11	Balai Raya Kpg. Bayor
Mambong (N19)	Jambu	198/19/12	SK Kpg. Emperoh Jambu
Mambong (N19)	Semban	198/19/13	Dewan Serbaguna Kpg. Semban Begoh Resettlement Scheme
Mambong (N19)	Tebia	198/19/14	Dewan Serbaguna Kpg. Sait Bengoh Resettlement Scheme
Mambong (N19)	Danu	198/19/15	Balai Raya Kpg. Danu
Mambong (N19)	Temurang	198/19/16	Balai Raya Kpg. Temurang Baru; Balai Raya Kpg. Biya Jaber
Mambong (N19)	Bengoh	198/19/17	Balai Raya Kpg. Begoh
Mambong (N19)	Gerung	198/19/18	Balai Raya Kpg. Gerung
Mambong (N19)	Semadang	198/19/19	SK St. Patrick Semadang
Mambong (N19)	Karu	198/19/20	SK Puruh Karu
Mambong (N19)	Seratau	198/19/21	SK St. Francis Xavier Kpg. Seratau
Mambong (N19)	Punau	198/19/22	SK St. George Punau
Mambong (N19)	Bunuk	198/19/23	SK St. Paul Bunuk
Mambong (N19)	Batu Gong	198/19/24	Balai Raya Batu Gong
Mambong (N19)	Anah Rais	198/19/25	SK St. Philip Padawan
Mambong (N19)	Sepit	198/19/26	Balai Raya Kpg. Sepit; Balai Raya Kpg. Parang; Balai Raya Kph. Assum
Mambong (N19)	Kiding	198/19/27	Balai Raya Kpg. Kiding; Balai Raya Kpg. Biya Kakas
Mambong (N19)	Simuti	198/19/28	Dewan Serbaguna Kpg. Sibakar
Mambong (N19)	Maras	198/18/29	Balai Raya Kpg. Nusaraya; Balai Raya Kpg. Biya Kemas
Mambong (N19)	Sadir	198/19/30	SK St. Bernard Sadir
Mambong (N19)	Pengkalan Ampat	198/19/31	SK Pengkalan Ampat
Mambong (N19)	Masaan	198/19/32	Dewan Manggeng Kpg Masaan

=== Representation history ===
Members of the Legislative Assembly for Mambong
Assembly	No	Years	Member	Party
Constituency created from Bengoh and Tarat
18th	N19	2016-2018	Jerip Susil	BN (Direct member)
18th	N19	2018-2019	Jerip Susil	PSB
18th	N19	2019	Jerip Susil	Independent
18th	N19	2019-2021	Jerip Susil	GPS (PBB)
19th	N19	2021–2026	Jerip Susil	GPS (PBB)

== Election results ==
Sarawak state election, 2026
Party	Candidate	Votes	%	∆%
GPS				▲
PH				▲
PBK	Rangen Jamang			▲
Total valid votes				
Total rejected ballots				
Unreturned ballots				
Turnout				
Registered electors				
Majority				

Sarawak state election, 2021
Party	Candidate	Votes	%	∆%
GPS	Jerip Susil	5,865	52.00	▲52.00
PSB	Sanjan Daik	2,794	24.77	▲24.77
DAP	Chang Hon Hiung	1,517	13.45	▼10.86
PBK	Joshua Roman	958	8.49	▲8.49
ASPIRASI	Chong Siew Hung	144	1.28	▲1.28
Total valid votes		11,278	100.00	
Total rejected ballots		146		
Unreturned ballots		58		
Turnout		11,482	59.45	▼8.70
Registered electors		19,315		
Majority		3,071	27.23	▼1.42
GPS gain from BN		Swing		?
Source(s) https://lom.agc.gov.my/ilims/upload/portal/akta/outputp/1718688/PUB687.pdf

Sarawak state election, 2016
Party	Candidate	Votes	%
BN	Jerip Susil	6,161	52.96
DAP	Sanjan Daik	2,828	24.31
PKR	Willie Mongin	2,645	22.74
Total valid votes		11,634	100.00
Total rejected ballots		200	
Unreturned ballots		70	
Turnout		11,904	68.15
Registered electors		17,467	
Majority		3,333	28.65
This was a new constituency created.
Source(s) "Federal Government Gazette - Notice of Contested Election, State Legislative Assembly of the State of Sarawak [P.U. (B) 190/2016]" (PDF). Attorney General's Chambers of Malaysia. 25 April 2016. Archived from the original (PDF) on 2017-06-12. "Senarai Calon yang Disahkan Layak Bertanding Pilihan Raya Dewan Undangan Negeri ke-11". Election Commission of Malaysia. 25 April 2016. Archived from the original on 25 April 2016.
