= Parti Sarawak Bersatu =

Malaysian political party (2014–2024)

United Sarawak Party Parti Sarawak Bersatu
- Malay name: Parti Sarawak Bersatu ڤرتي سراوق برساتو
- Chinese name: 砂拉越全民團結黨 砂拉越全民团结党; Sa-la-oa̍t Choân-bîn Thoân-kiat-tóng; Saa1 Laa1 Jyut6 Cyun4 Man4 Tyun4 Git3 Dong2; Shālāyuè quan min tuán jié dǎng
- Abbreviation: PSB
- President: Wong Soon Koh
- Secretary-General: Baru Bian
- Founders: Wong Soon Koh; Jerip Susil; Johnical Rayong Ngipa; Ranum Mina
- Founded: 2014 (Note: 2014 as United People's Party; 2019 as Parti Sarawak Bersatu)
- Dissolved: 19 March 2024
- Split from: Sarawak United People's Party (SUPP); Sarawak People's Energy Party (TERAS)
- Preceded by: UPP (2014–2019); SUPP (Wong Soon Koh faction)
- Merged into: Progressive Democratic Party (PDP)
- Headquarters: Kuching, Sarawak
- Membership: 80,000 (upon dissolution)
- Ideology: Regionalism; Self-determination; National conservatism MA63 & Sarawak rights Multiracial democracy National reformism
- Political position: Centre to centre-right
- National affiliation: Allied coalitions: Gabungan Parti Sarawak (2019 & 2023–2024) (Note: The party was allied with Barisan Nasional (2014–2019), Pakatan Harapan (2019–2021), and PBK–PBDSB (2022)) National Unity Government (2023–2024)
- Colours: Red, Yellow, Gold
- Slogan: Ubah Sekarang, Sarawak Maju
- Anthem: Parti Sarawak Bersatu

Party flag
- (PSB flag upon dissolution)

Website
- www.partisarawakbersatu.org

The United Sarawak Party (Malay: Parti Sarawak Bersatu, abbreviated PSB) was a multi-racial political party based in the state of Sarawak.

== History ==
=== 2014–18: Formation as United People's Party (UPP) ===
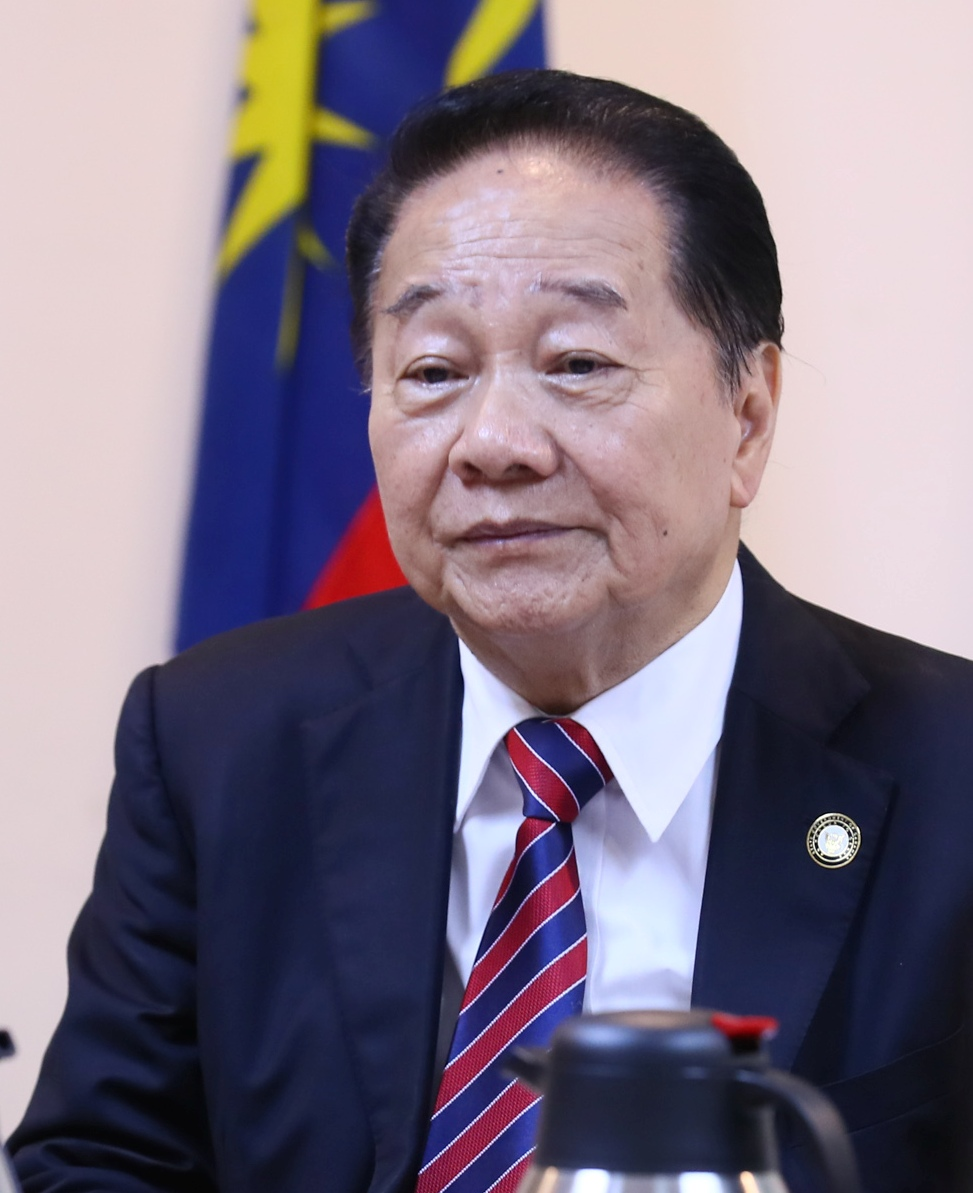
Wong Soon Koh, founder of PSB

Logo of initial United People's Party (UPP), 2014–2019.

The party was initially founded as United People's Party and officially launched on 17 August 2014 as a new symbol of change and unity for the Chinese community of Sarawak with its headquarters based at Kuching. The UPP was actually a splinter party of Sarawak United People's Party (SUPP) set-up by the Second Finance Minister for Sarawak, Wong Soon Koh along with his supporters following a leadership tussle of the party then and it started as a pro-Barisan Nasional (BN) political pact. However the hopes that the UPP would join BN were objected by the coalition leadership. UPP rejected Parti Pesaka Bumiputera Bersatu (PBB)'s suggestion that UPP should dissolve to pave the way for its members to join other Sarawak BN component parties arguing that they have over 26 full-fledged branches with 30,000 members and that UPP was able to raise RM38 million (US$9.3 million) for an education fund in less than a fortnight. UPP's ability to raise significant funds is widely attributed to the support they enjoy from Sarawak's powerful timber tycoons.

A Memorandum of Understanding (MoU) was made between UPP and SUPP of BN for the division of seats to be contested in the 2016 Sarawak state election which saw UPP win five out of seven seats it was allocated. UPP however cancelled the MoU with SUPP after the 2016 state election.

Both rival parties again signed MoU for collaboration in the 2018 general election (GE14). After the GE14 which saw the downfall of BN federal government, the state BN components quit and formed themselves as the new Gabungan Parti Sarawak (GPS) coalition without UPP.

=== 2019: Re-branding as Parti Sarawak Bersatu (PSB) ===
UPP was re-branded to United Sarawak Party or Parti Sarawak Bersatu (PSB), after an Extraordinary Delegates Conference (EDC) on 8 December 2018. The party's name change and new logo was approved by the Registrar of Societies (RoS) in 2019. PSB, amidst of being left out of the newly formed GPS coalition, chose to maintain its status quo, but shifted from being a BN-friendly to GPS-friendly party by providing supply and confidence to the new GPS coalition of the Sarawak state government. Somehow the party status changed when PSB opted to be an independent instead when its president, Wong, tendered his resignation from the state Cabinet as the International Trade and e-Commerce Minister and second Minister of Finance in July 2019 .

=== 2020–21: Malaysian political crisis ===
During the 2020 Malaysian political crisis, the support inclination of PSB Sri Aman MP; Masir Kujat, was in much speculation and attention for the tussling parties of the political scene. Despite being arranged to be seated alongside the new governing Perikatan Nasional (PN) backbencher MPs in the Dewan Rakyat during the historic the one-day Parliament sitting on 17 May, Masir has clarified that he and the PSB party is still in the opposition bloc in the federal and state levels.

Impact of the prolonged political crisis had also witnessed two former Sarawak People's Justice Party (PKR) legislature representatives; Selangau MP incumbent Ba Kelalan assemblyman Baru Bian and Batu Lintang assemblyman See Chee How, together with their supporters have joined PSB on 30 May 2020. In August 2021, PM Muhyiddin Yassin of PN resigned, PSB pledge to support PH's Anwar Ibrahim as prime ministerial candidate but will back Shafie Apdal of Parti Warisan Sabah as an alternative if Anwar not chosen. PSB though stated it wish to remain an independent party without affiliation to any political alliance including PH.

=== 2021–23: State and Federal elections ===
In the 2021 Sarawak state election, PSB managed to retain the four seats of Batu Lintang, Engkilili, Ba'kelalan and Bawang Assan, making it the largest opposition party in Sarawak, replacing Pakatan Harapan (PH) which only retained two seats of Pending and Padungan through the Democratic Action Party (DAP). However on 12 August 2022, See Chee How, the MLA for Batu Lintang resigned from PSB and becoming an independent MLA, leaving PSB with 3 MLAs and the Opposition with 5 MLAs in the Legislative Assembly. In 2022, it cooperated with Parti Bumi Kenyalang and Parti Bansa Dayak Sarawak Baru, with PBK fielding almost all (including PBK president) but one candidate under PSB's logo. It was intended to represent Sarawakian local opposition in the election for Dewan Rakyat in 2022.

After elections for Sarawak assembly in 2021 and for Dewan Rakyat in 2022, the party lost its representation in the Dewan Rakyat but became the largest opposition party in Sarawak. The party reacted positively to the formation of unity government led by Anwar Ibrahim. On 13 July 2023, PSB president Wong Soon Koh, on behalf of the party, signed a Memorandum of Understanding (MoU) with the Progressive Democratic Party (PDP) to show its support for the GPS coalition. However, Wong remained the State Leader of the Opposition of Sarawak and PSB stayed in the opposition in the Sarawak State Legislative Assembly. It pledged to support Abang Johari's state government again as well as supporting Anwar Ibrahim's government at federal level.

=== 2024: PSB dissolves, joining PDP ===
According to PSB Deputy President Johnical Rayong Ngipa, the party was set to be dissolved before Chinese New Year in 2024 and all existing PSB members were expected to join the PDP, a component party of the GPS coalition. On 6 April 2024, Wong confirmed that the Registrar of Societies had approved the application of PSB to be dissolved on 19 March 2024 and all 80,000 PSB members had joined the PDP upon the dissolution. PDP President Tiong King Sing also appointed Wong as the Senior Vice President, Johnical Rayong Ngipa and Baru Bian as Vice Presidents of PDP. Upon the dissolution of PSB and the joining of its members in GPS, which was the state ruling coalition, Chong Chieng Jen took office as the Sarawak State Opposition Leader for the second term after the Sarawak opposition was left with only PH and DAP who were represented by only two MLAs Chong himself who was the Padungan MLA and Pending MLA Violet Yong Wui Wui. GPS also held 79 of the 82 seats in the State Assembly, ruling the state with more than two-thirds supermajority support of the assembly.

== Government offices ==
=== State government ===
- Sarawak (2016–2019, 2023–2024)

Note: bold as Premier/Chief Minister, italic as junior partner

== General election results ==
Election	Total seats won	Seats contested	Total votes	Voting Percentage	Outcome of election	Election leader
2018	0 / 222	10	57,579	0.37	No representation in Parliament (BN)	Wong Soon Koh
2022	0 / 222	7	22,389	0.00	No representation in Parliament (PERKASA)	Wong Soon Koh

=== State election results ===
Sarawak State Legislative Assembly
Election	Votes		Seats			Position (Note: As part of electoral coalition.)	Status
Election	Count	%	Result	Won / contested	+/–	Position	Status
2016	N/A (BN Direct)		5 / 82	5 / 7	▲5	1st (Barisan Nasional)	BN–UPP (2016–2019) (Note: GPS–PSB (2018–2019))
2016	N/A (BN Direct)		5 / 82	5 / 7	▲5	1st (Barisan Nasional)	Opposition (2016–2021)
2021	139,401	18.7	4 / 82	4 / 70	▼1	2nd	Opposition (2021–2023)
2021	139,401	18.7	4 / 82	4 / 70	▼1	2nd	GPS–PSB (2023–2024)

== See also ==
- Politics of Malaysia
- List of political parties in Malaysia
