= Results of the 2021 Sarawak state election =

Election results in Sarawak, Malaysia

These are the results of the 2021 Sarawak state election. The elections was held in Sarawak on 18 December 2021.

== Map ==
Map of constituencies and winning faction

== Summary ==
Party or alliance		Votes	%	Seats	+/–
Gabungan Parti Sarawak	Parti Pesaka Bumiputera Bersatu	271,718	36.41	47	0
Gabungan Parti Sarawak	Sarawak United Peoples' Party	100,047	13.40	13	+6
Gabungan Parti Sarawak	Parti Rakyat Sarawak	50,423	6.76	11	0
Gabungan Parti Sarawak	Progressive Democratic Party	35,045	4.70	5	+2
Gabungan Parti Sarawak	Total	457,233	61.26	76	+8
Parti Sarawak Bersatu		139,515	18.69	4	New
Pakatan Harapan	Democratic Action Party	55,308	7.41	2	–3
Pakatan Harapan	People's Justice Party	19,865	2.66	0	0
Pakatan Harapan	National Trust Party	3,024	0.41	0	0
Pakatan Harapan	Total	78,197	10.48	2	–3
Parti Bumi Kenyalang		40,763	5.46	0	New
Gabungan Anak Sarawak	Parti Bansa Dayak Sarawak Baru	2,972	0.40	0	0
Gabungan Anak Sarawak	Parti Aspirasi Rakyat Sarawak	2,525	0.34	0	0
Gabungan Anak Sarawak	Total	5,497	0.74	0	–3
Perikatan Nasional	Pan-Malaysian Islamic Party	2,058	0.28	0	0
Parti Sedar Rakyat Sarawak		1,204	0.16	0	New
Independents		21,882	2.93	0	–1
Total		746,349	100.00	82	0
Valid votes		746,349	98.25		
Invalid/blank votes		13,278	1.75		
Total votes		759,627	100.00		
Registered voters/turnout		1,252,014	60.67		
Source: Dashboard SPR

== Full result ==
#	Constituency	Registered Electors	Winner	Votes	Votes %	Majority	Opponent(s)	Votes	Votes %	Total valid votes	Incumbent
GPS 76 | PSB 4 | DAP 2 | PKR 0 | AMANAH 0 | PBK 0 | PAS 0 | PBDSB 0 | ASPIRASI 0 | SEDAR 0 | IND 0
N01	Opar	11,434	Billy Sujang (GPS–SUPP)	3,659	46.77%	1,689	Ranum Mina (PSB)	1,970	25.18%	7,823	Ranum Mina (PSB)
N01	Opar	11,434	Billy Sujang (GPS–SUPP)	3,659	46.77%	1,689	Freedy Misid (PBK)	1,487	19.01%	7,823	Ranum Mina (PSB)
N01	Opar	11,434	Billy Sujang (GPS–SUPP)	3,659	46.77%	1,689	Meneng Biris (PH–PKR)	327	4.18%	7,823	Ranum Mina (PSB)
N01	Opar	11,434	Billy Sujang (GPS–SUPP)	3,659	46.77%	1,689	Saini Kakong (GASAK–PBDSB)	220	2.81%	7,823	Ranum Mina (PSB)
N01	Opar	11,434	Billy Sujang (GPS–SUPP)	3,659	46.77%	1,689	Bayang Teron (SEDAR)	160	2.05%	7,823	Ranum Mina (PSB)
N02	Tasik Biru	18,295	Henry Harry Jinep (GPS–PDP)	6,325	53.71%	4,212	Paul Shanon Kenbell Barin (PBK)	2,113	17.94%	11,777	Henry Harry Jinep (GPS–PDP)
N02	Tasik Biru	18,295	Henry Harry Jinep (GPS–PDP)	6,325	53.71%	4,212	Tiki Lafe (PSB)	1,980	16.81%	11,777	Henry Harry Jinep (GPS–PDP)
N02	Tasik Biru	18,295	Henry Harry Jinep (GPS–PDP)	6,325	53.71%	4,212	Granda Aing (PH–DAP)	1,359	11.54%	11,777	Henry Harry Jinep (GPS–PDP)
N03	Tanjong Datu	11,255	Azizul Annuar Adenan (GPS–PBB)	5,423	79.39%	4,502	Jery'in Fauzi (PSB)	921	13.48%	6,831	Jamilah Anu (GPS–PBB)
N03	Tanjong Datu	11,255	Azizul Annuar Adenan (GPS–PBB)	5,423	79.39%	4,502	Abdul Talip Ba'ew (IND)	261	3.82%	6,831	Jamilah Anu (GPS–PBB)
N03	Tanjong Datu	11,255	Azizul Annuar Adenan (GPS–PBB)	5,423	79.39%	4,502	Goem Pijar (PBK)	226	3.31%	6,831	Jamilah Anu (GPS–PBB)
N04	Pantai Damai	20,473	Abdul Rahman Junaidi (GPS–PBB)	10,699	82.19%	8,381	Mahmud Sabli (PSB)	2,318	17.81%	13,017	Abdul Rahman Junaidi (GPS–PBB)
N05	Demak Laut	14,813	Hazland Abang Hipni (GPS–PBB)	7,636	78.24%	6,399	Yatika Jelani (PSB)	1,237	12.68%	9,759	Hazland Abang Hipni (GPS–PBB)
N05	Demak Laut	14,813	Hazland Abang Hipni (GPS–PBB)	7,636	78.24%	6,399	Khairul Ahmat (IND)	674	6.91%	9,759	Hazland Abang Hipni (GPS–PBB)
N05	Demak Laut	14,813	Hazland Abang Hipni (GPS–PBB)	7,636	78.24%	6,399	Mohamad Zen Peli (PH–AMANAH)	212	2.17%	9,759	Hazland Abang Hipni (GPS–PBB)
N06	Tupong	25,957	Fazzrudin Abdul Rahman (GPS–PBB)	12,544	85.25%	11,209	Ahmad Nazib Johari (PH–PKR)	1,335	9.07%	14,715	Fazzrudin Abdul Rahman (GPS–PBB)
N06	Tupong	25,957	Fazzrudin Abdul Rahman (GPS–PBB)	12,544	85.25%	11,209	Chan Haong Yen (PBK)	836	5.68%	14,715	Fazzrudin Abdul Rahman (GPS–PBB)
N07	Samariang	21,345	Sharifah Hasidah Sayeed Aman Ghazali (GPS–PBB)	11,354	87.61%	10,283	Abang Abdul Halil Abang Naili (PH–AMANAH)	1,071	8.26%	12,960	Sharifah Hasidah Sayeed Aman Ghazali (GPS–PBB)
N07	Samariang	21,345	Sharifah Hasidah Sayeed Aman Ghazali (GPS–PBB)	11,354	87.61%	10,283	Othman Abdillah (SEDAR)	535	4.13%	12,960	Sharifah Hasidah Sayeed Aman Ghazali (GPS–PBB)
N08	Satok	13,425	Ibrahim Baki (GPS–PBB)	6,991	83.59%	6,033	Nor Irwan Ahmat Nor (PH–PKR)	958	11.45%	8,364	Abang Abdul Rahman Zohari Abang Openg (GPS–PBB)
N08	Satok	13,425	Ibrahim Baki (GPS–PBB)	6,991	83.59%	6,033	Awang Badele Awang Ali (PBK)	415	4.96%	8,364	Abang Abdul Rahman Zohari Abang Openg (GPS–PBB)
N09	Padungan	20,687	Chong Chieng Jen (PH–DAP)	4,686	50.40%	1,198	Wee Hong Seng (GPS–SUPP)	3,488	37.52%	9,297	Wong King Wei (IND)
N09	Padungan	20,687	Chong Chieng Jen (PH–DAP)	4,686	50.40%	1,198	Raymond Thong Ee Yu (PBK)	930	10.00%	9,297	Wong King Wei (IND)
N09	Padungan	20,687	Chong Chieng Jen (PH–DAP)	4,686	50.40%	1,198	Lina Soo (GASAK–ASPIRASI)	193	2.08%	9,297	Wong King Wei (IND)
N10	Pending	28,913	Violet Yong Wui Wui (PH–DAP)	5,188	40.29%	540	Milton Foo Tiang Wee (GPS–SUPP)	4,648	36.10%	12,876	Violet Yong Wui Wui (PH–DAP)
N10	Pending	28,913	Violet Yong Wui Wui (PH–DAP)	5,188	40.29%	540	Tan Kay Hok (PSB)	1,858	14.43%	12,876	Violet Yong Wui Wui (PH–DAP)
N10	Pending	28,913	Violet Yong Wui Wui (PH–DAP)	5,188	40.29%	540	Teo Kuang Kim (PBK)	978	7.60%	12,876	Violet Yong Wui Wui (PH–DAP)
N10	Pending	28,913	Violet Yong Wui Wui (PH–DAP)	5,188	40.29%	540	Chan Chee Hiong (GASAK–ASPIRASI)	204	1.58%	12,876	Violet Yong Wui Wui (PH–DAP)
N11	Batu Lintang	29,617	See Chee How (PSB)	4,420	35.85%	93	Sih Hua Tong (GPS–SUPP)	4,327	35.10%	12,327	See Chee How (PSB)
N11	Batu Lintang	29,617	See Chee How (PSB)	4,420	35.85%	93	Cherishe Ng Phuay Hui (PH–PKR)	1,823	14.79%	12,327	See Chee How (PSB)
N11	Batu Lintang	29,617	See Chee How (PSB)	4,420	35.85%	93	Voon Lee Shan (PBK)	1,570	12.74%	12,327	See Chee How (PSB)
N11	Batu Lintang	29,617	See Chee How (PSB)	4,420	35.85%	93	Leong Shaow Tung (GASAK–ASPIRASI)	187	1.52%	12,327	See Chee How (PSB)
N12	Kota Sentosa	25,863	Yap Yau Sin (GPS–SUPP)	5,806	43.05%	1,683	Michael Kong Feng Nian (PH–DAP)	4,123	30.57%	13,487	Chong Chieng Jen (PH–DAP)
N12	Kota Sentosa	25,863	Yap Yau Sin (GPS–SUPP)	5,806	43.05%	1,683	Lau Pang Heng (PSB)	2,328	17.26%	13,487	Chong Chieng Jen (PH–DAP)
N12	Kota Sentosa	25,863	Yap Yau Sin (GPS–SUPP)	5,806	43.05%	1,683	Lue Cheng Hing (PBK)	1,015	7.53%	13,487	Chong Chieng Jen (PH–DAP)
N12	Kota Sentosa	25,863	Yap Yau Sin (GPS–SUPP)	5,806	43.05%	1,683	Tan Kok Chiang (GASAK–ASPIRASI)	215	1.59%	13,487	Chong Chieng Jen (PH–DAP)
N13	Batu Kitang	20,792	Lo Khere Chiang (GPS–SUPP)	6,307	57.66%	4,163	Abdul Aziz Isa Marindo (PH–DAP)	2,144	19.60%	10,938	Lo Khere Chiang (GPS–SUPP)
N13	Batu Kitang	20,792	Lo Khere Chiang (GPS–SUPP)	6,307	57.66%	4,163	Liu Thian Leong (PSB)	1,812	16.57%	10,938	Lo Khere Chiang (GPS–SUPP)
N13	Batu Kitang	20,792	Lo Khere Chiang (GPS–SUPP)	6,307	57.66%	4,163	Wong Tun Teck (PBK)	675	6.17%	10,938	Lo Khere Chiang (GPS–SUPP)
N14	Batu Kawah	19,465	Sim Kui Hian (GPS–SUPP)	7,827	70.20%	5,393	Kelvin Yii Lee Wuen (PH–DAP)	2,434	21.83%	11,150	Sim Kui Hian (GPS–SUPP)
N14	Batu Kawah	19,465	Sim Kui Hian (GPS–SUPP)	7,827	70.20%	5,393	Chai Kueh Khun (PBK)	756	6.78%	11,150	Sim Kui Hian (GPS–SUPP)
N14	Batu Kawah	19,465	Sim Kui Hian (GPS–SUPP)	7,827	70.20%	5,393	Fong Pau Teck (GASAK–ASPIRASI)	133	1.19%	11,150	Sim Kui Hian (GPS–SUPP)
N15	Asajaya	12,337	Abdul Karim Rahman Hamzah (GPS–PBB)	6,380	70.03%	4,531	Ishak Buji (PSB)	1,849	20.30%	9,109	Abdul Karim Rahman Hamzah (GPS–PBB)
N15	Asajaya	12,337	Abdul Karim Rahman Hamzah (GPS–PBB)	6,380	70.03%	4,531	Mahmud Epah (PH–PKR)	721	7.92%	9,109	Abdul Karim Rahman Hamzah (GPS–PBB)
N15	Asajaya	12,337	Abdul Karim Rahman Hamzah (GPS–PBB)	6,380	70.03%	4,531	Mohamad Hamdeen Saharuddin (PBK)	159	1.75%	9,109	Abdul Karim Rahman Hamzah (GPS–PBB)
N16	Muara Tuang	18,387	Idris Buang (GPS–PBB)	8,435	63.64%	6,237	Ismawi Muhammad (IND)	2,198	16.58%	13,257	Idris Buang (GPS–PBB)
N16	Muara Tuang	18,387	Idris Buang (GPS–PBB)	8,435	63.64%	6,237	Yakup Khalid (PSB)	1,838	13.86%	13,257	Idris Buang (GPS–PBB)
N16	Muara Tuang	18,387	Idris Buang (GPS–PBB)	8,435	63.64%	6,237	Hipni Sulaiman (SEDAR)	357	2.69%	13,257	Idris Buang (GPS–PBB)
N16	Muara Tuang	18,387	Idris Buang (GPS–PBB)	8,435	63.64%	6,237	Daud Eali (PH–AMANAH)	239	1.80%	13,257	Idris Buang (GPS–PBB)
N16	Muara Tuang	18,387	Idris Buang (GPS–PBB)	8,435	63.64%	6,237	Sigandam Sulaiman (PBK)	190	1.43%	13,257	Idris Buang (GPS–PBB)
N17	Stakan	12,139	Hamzah Brahim (GPS–PBB)	7,854	72.46%	5,807	George Young Si Ricord Junior (PSB)	2,047	18.88%	10,840	Mohammad Ali Mahmud (GPS–PBB)
N17	Stakan	12,139	Hamzah Brahim (GPS–PBB)	7,854	72.46%	5,807	Leslie Ting Xiang Zhi (PH–DAP)	524	4.83%	10,840	Mohammad Ali Mahmud (GPS–PBB)
N17	Stakan	12,139	Hamzah Brahim (GPS–PBB)	7,854	72.46%	5,807	Atet Dego (PBK)	415	3.83%	10,840	Mohammad Ali Mahmud (GPS–PBB)
N18	Serembu	9,828	Miro Simuh (GPS–PBB)	4,068	57.69%	1,650	Iana Akam (PSB)	2,418	34.29%	7,052	Miro Simuh (GPS–PBB)
N18	Serembu	9,828	Miro Simuh (GPS–PBB)	4,068	57.69%	1,650	Jecky Misieng (PBK)	257	3.64%	7,052	Miro Simuh (GPS–PBB)
N18	Serembu	9,828	Miro Simuh (GPS–PBB)	4,068	57.69%	1,650	Michael Saweng (PH–PKR)	217	3.08%	7,052	Miro Simuh (GPS–PBB)
N18	Serembu	9,828	Miro Simuh (GPS–PBB)	4,068	57.69%	1,650	Buln Patrick Ribos (GASAK–ASPIRASI)	92	1.30%	7,052	Miro Simuh (GPS–PBB)
N19	Mambong	18,445	Jerip Susil (GPS–PBB)	5,865	52.01%	3,071	Sanjan Daik (PSB)	2,794	24.77%	11,278	Jerip Susil (GPS–PBB)
N19	Mambong	18,445	Jerip Susil (GPS–PBB)	5,865	52.01%	3,071	Chang Hon Hiuong (PH–DAP)	1,517	13.45%	11,278	Jerip Susil (GPS–PBB)
N19	Mambong	18,445	Jerip Susil (GPS–PBB)	5,865	52.01%	3,071	Joshua Roman (PBK)	958	8.49%	11,278	Jerip Susil (GPS–PBB)
N19	Mambong	18,445	Jerip Susil (GPS–PBB)	5,865	52.01%	3,071	Chong Siew Hung (GASAK–ASPIRASI)	144	1.28%	11,278	Jerip Susil (GPS–PBB)
N20	Tarat	17,699	Roland Sagah Wee Inn (GPS–PBB)	6,500	60.25%	5,008	Dadi Tiap Juul (PSB)	1,492	13.83%	10,788	Roland Sagah Wee Inn (GPS–PBB)
N20	Tarat	17,699	Roland Sagah Wee Inn (GPS–PBB)	6,500	60.25%	5,008	Christo Michael (PH–PKR)	1,445	13.39%	10,788	Roland Sagah Wee Inn (GPS–PBB)
N20	Tarat	17,699	Roland Sagah Wee Inn (GPS–PBB)	6,500	60.25%	5,008	Edison Jamang (PBK)	1,182	10.96%	10,788	Roland Sagah Wee Inn (GPS–PBB)
N20	Tarat	17,699	Roland Sagah Wee Inn (GPS–PBB)	6,500	60.25%	5,008	Bai Dungak (IND)	169	1.57%	10,788	Roland Sagah Wee Inn (GPS–PBB)
N21	Tebedu	12,029	Simon Sinang Bada (GPS–PBB)	5,082	61.82%	3,273	Cheyne Kambeng (PSB)	1,809	22.00%	8,221	Michael Manyin Jawong (GPS–PBB)
N21	Tebedu	12,029	Simon Sinang Bada (GPS–PBB)	5,082	61.82%	3,273	Jonathan Lantik Ok (PBK)	614	7.47%	8,221	Michael Manyin Jawong (GPS–PBB)
N21	Tebedu	12,029	Simon Sinang Bada (GPS–PBB)	5,082	61.82%	3,273	Senior William Rade (PH–PKR)	610	7.42%	8,221	Michael Manyin Jawong (GPS–PBB)
N21	Tebedu	12,029	Simon Sinang Bada (GPS–PBB)	5,082	61.82%	3,273	Roland Bangu (IND)	106	1.29%	8,221	Michael Manyin Jawong (GPS–PBB)
N22	Kedup	11,201	Maclaine Ben @ Martin Ben (GPS–PBB)	5,178	63.34%	3,566	Dominic Dado Sagin (PSB)	1,612	19.72%	8,175	Maclaine Ben @ Martin Ben (GPS–PBB)
N22	Kedup	11,201	Maclaine Ben @ Martin Ben (GPS–PBB)	5,178	63.34%	3,566	Stephen Morgan Sungan (PBK)	745	9.11%	8,175	Maclaine Ben @ Martin Ben (GPS–PBB)
N22	Kedup	11,201	Maclaine Ben @ Martin Ben (GPS–PBB)	5,178	63.34%	3,566	Laerry Jabul (PH–DAP)	640	7.83%	8,175	Maclaine Ben @ Martin Ben (GPS–PBB)
N23	Bukit Semuja	14,714	John Ilus (GPS–PBB)	6,113	70.06%	4,705	Elsiy Tingang (PSB)	1,408	16.14%	8,725	John Ilus (GPS–PBB)
N23	Bukit Semuja	14,714	John Ilus (GPS–PBB)	6,113	70.06%	4,705	Brolin Nicholsion Benedict Achung (PH–DAP)	777	8.91%	8,725	John Ilus (GPS–PBB)
N23	Bukit Semuja	14,714	John Ilus (GPS–PBB)	6,113	70.06%	4,705	Edward Andrew Luwak (PBK)	427	4.89%	8,725	John Ilus (GPS–PBB)
N24	Sadong Jaya	7,653	Aidel Lariwoo (GPS–PBB)	4,333	82.96%	3,877	Nur Khairunisa Adbullah (PSB)	456	8.73%	5,223	Aidel Lariwoo (GPS–PBB)
N24	Sadong Jaya	7,653	Aidel Lariwoo (GPS–PBB)	4,333	82.96%	3,877	Piee Ling (PH–PKR)	319	6.11%	5,223	Aidel Lariwoo (GPS–PBB)
N24	Sadong Jaya	7,653	Aidel Lariwoo (GPS–PBB)	4,333	82.96%	3,877	Jolhi Bee (PBK)	115	2.20%	5,223	Aidel Lariwoo (GPS–PBB)
N25	Simunjan	8,188	Awla Dris (GPS–PBB)	4,276	73.01%	3,351	Raily @ Reli Ali (PSB)	925	15.80%	5,856	Awla Dris (GPS–PBB)
N25	Simunjan	8,188	Awla Dris (GPS–PBB)	4,276	73.01%	3,351	Hapeni Fadil (PH–PKR)	518	8.85%	5,856	Awla Dris (GPS–PBB)
N25	Simunjan	8,188	Awla Dris (GPS–PBB)	4,276	73.01%	3,351	Saharuddin Abdullah (PBK)	137	2.34%	5,856	Awla Dris (GPS–PBB)
N26	Gedong	7,206	Abang Abdul Rahman Zohari Abang Openg (GPS–PBB)	4,310	81.88%	3,607	Mohamad Sofian Fariz Sharbini (PSB)	703	13.35%	5,264	Mohd Naroden Majais (GPS–PBB)
N26	Gedong	7,206	Abang Abdul Rahman Zohari Abang Openg (GPS–PBB)	4,310	81.88%	3,607	Tomson Ango (PBK)	157	2.98%	5,264	Mohd Naroden Majais (GPS–PBB)
N26	Gedong	7,206	Abang Abdul Rahman Zohari Abang Openg (GPS–PBB)	4,310	81.88%	3,607	Kamal Bujang (PH–AMANAH)	94	1.79%	5,264	Mohd Naroden Majais (GPS–PBB)
N27	Sebuyau	9,367	Julaihi Narawi (GPS–PBB)	4,937	79.29%	4,134	Wel @ Maxwel Rojis (PH–AMANAH)	803	12.90%	6,226	Julaihi Narawi (GPS–PBB)
N27	Sebuyau	9,367	Julaihi Narawi (GPS–PBB)	4,937	79.29%	4,134	Wan Chee Wan Mahjar (PBK)	486	7.81%	6,226	Julaihi Narawi (GPS–PBB)
N28	Lingga	9,575	Dayang Noorazah Awang Sohor (GPS–PBB)	3,700	58.11%	2,273	Wan Abdillah Edruce Wan Abdul Rahman (PSB)	1,427	22.41%	6,368	Simoi Peri (GPS–PBB)
N28	Lingga	9,575	Dayang Noorazah Awang Sohor (GPS–PBB)	3,700	58.11%	2,273	Mohd Sepian Abang Daud (IND)	880	13.82%	6,368	Simoi Peri (GPS–PBB)
N28	Lingga	9,575	Dayang Noorazah Awang Sohor (GPS–PBB)	3,700	58.11%	2,273	Baha Imam (PBK)	139	2.18%	6,368	Simoi Peri (GPS–PBB)
N28	Lingga	9,575	Dayang Noorazah Awang Sohor (GPS–PBB)	3,700	58.11%	2,273	Abang Abdul Kasim Abang Bujang (PH–PKR)	130	2.04%	6,368	Simoi Peri (GPS–PBB)
N28	Lingga	9,575	Dayang Noorazah Awang Sohor (GPS–PBB)	3,700	58.11%	2,273	Abang Ahmad Abang Suni (SEDAR)	92	1.44%	6,368	Simoi Peri (GPS–PBB)
N29	Beting Maro	11,094	Razaili Gapor (GPS–PBB)	3,769	51.62%	1,711	Mohamad Arifiriazul Paijo (PN–PAS)	2,058	28.18%	7,302	Razaili Gapor (GPS–PBB)
N29	Beting Maro	11,094	Razaili Gapor (GPS–PBB)	3,769	51.62%	1,711	Abang Zulkifli Abang Engkeh (PH–PKR)	765	10.48%	7,302	Razaili Gapor (GPS–PBB)
N29	Beting Maro	11,094	Razaili Gapor (GPS–PBB)	3,769	51.62%	1,711	Safiudin Matsah (IND)	636	8.71%	7,302	Razaili Gapor (GPS–PBB)
N29	Beting Maro	11,094	Razaili Gapor (GPS–PBB)	3,769	51.62%	1,711	Jackie Chiew Su Chee (PBK)	74	1.01%	7,302	Razaili Gapor (GPS–PBB)
N30	Balai Ringin	10,789	Snowdan Lawan (GPS–PRS)	4,816	56.38%	1,285	Masir Kujat (PSB)	3,531	41.34%	8,542	Snowdan Lawan (GPS–PRS)
N30	Balai Ringin	10,789	Snowdan Lawan (GPS–PRS)	4,816	56.38%	1,285	Kasim Mana (PBK)	195	2.28%	8,542	Snowdan Lawan (GPS–PRS)
N31	Bukit Begunan	8,824	Mong Dagang (GPS–PRS)	4,054	58.69%	1,402	Norina Umoi Utot (PSB)	2,652	38.40%	6,907	Mong Dagang (GPS–PRS)
N31	Bukit Begunan	8,824	Mong Dagang (GPS–PRS)	4,054	58.69%	1,402	Entusa Imam (GASAK–PBDSB)	115	1.66%	6,907	Mong Dagang (GPS–PRS)
N31	Bukit Begunan	8,824	Mong Dagang (GPS–PRS)	4,054	58.69%	1,402	Winton Langang Sangga (PBK)	86	1.25%	6,907	Mong Dagang (GPS–PRS)
N32	Simanggang	12,980	Francis Harden Hollis (GPS–SUPP)	3,954	48.94%	175	Walsin @ Wilson Entabang (PSB)	3,779	46.77%	8,080	Francis Harden Hollis (GPS–SUPP)
N32	Simanggang	12,980	Francis Harden Hollis (GPS–SUPP)	3,954	48.94%	175	Leon Jimat Donald (PH–DAP)	212	2.62%	8,080	Francis Harden Hollis (GPS–SUPP)
N32	Simanggang	12,980	Francis Harden Hollis (GPS–SUPP)	3,954	48.94%	175	Peli Aron (PBK)	135	1.67%	8,080	Francis Harden Hollis (GPS–SUPP)
N33	Engkilili	11,023	Johnichal Rayong Ngipa (PSB)	3,246	43.48%	1,191	Desmond Sateng Sanjan (GPS–SUPP)	2,055	27.53%	7,465	Francis Harden Hollis (GPS–SUPP)
N33	Engkilili	11,023	Johnichal Rayong Ngipa (PSB)	3,246	43.48%	1,191	Gemong Batu (IND)	2,013	26.97%	7,465	Francis Harden Hollis (GPS–SUPP)
N33	Engkilili	11,023	Johnichal Rayong Ngipa (PSB)	3,246	43.48%	1,191	Stel Datu (PBK)	151	2.02%	7,465	Francis Harden Hollis (GPS–SUPP)
N34	Batang Ai	9,857	Malcom Mussen Lamoh (GPS–PRS)	3,208	44.58%	738	John Linang Mereejon (IND)	2,470	34.33%	7,195	Malcom Mussen Lamoh (GPS–PRS)
N34	Batang Ai	9,857	Malcom Mussen Lamoh (GPS–PRS)	3,208	44.58%	738	William Nyallau Badak (PSB)	1,366	18.99%	7,195	Malcom Mussen Lamoh (GPS–PRS)
N34	Batang Ai	9,857	Malcom Mussen Lamoh (GPS–PRS)	3,208	44.58%	738	Usop Asun (PBK)	151	2.10%	7,195	Malcom Mussen Lamoh (GPS–PRS)
N35	Saribas	10,978	Ricky @ Mohamad Razi Sitam (GPS–PBB)	5,138	65.52%	3,236	Patek @ Patrick Kamis (PH–PKR)	1,902	24.25%	7,842	Ricky @ Mohamad Razi Sitam (GPS–PBB)
N35	Saribas	10,978	Ricky @ Mohamad Razi Sitam (GPS–PBB)	5,138	65.52%	3,236	Melainie Bolhassan (PSB)	668	8.52%	7,842	Ricky @ Mohamad Razi Sitam (GPS–PBB)
N35	Saribas	10,978	Ricky @ Mohamad Razi Sitam (GPS–PBB)	5,138	65.52%	3,236	Sim Min Leong (PBK)	74	0.94%	7,842	Ricky @ Mohamad Razi Sitam (GPS–PBB)
N35	Saribas	10,978	Ricky @ Mohamad Razi Sitam (GPS–PBB)	5,138	65.52%	3,236	Kurnaen Boben (SEDAR)	60	0.77%	7,842	Ricky @ Mohamad Razi Sitam (GPS–PBB)
N36	Layar	9,094	Gerald Rentap Jabu (GPS–PBB)	3,891	67.75%	2,039	Isik Utau (PSB)	1,852	32.25%	5,743	Gerald Rentap Jabu (GPS–PBB)
N37	Bukit Saban	8,897	Douglas Uggah Embas (GPS–PBB)	5,373	77.94%	3,988	Andria Gelayan Dundang (PSB)	1,385	20.09%	6,894	Douglas Uggah Embas (GPS–PBB)
N37	Bukit Saban	8,897	Douglas Uggah Embas (GPS–PBB)	5,373	77.94%	3,988	Mikail Mathew Abdullah (PH–PKR)	136	1.97%	6,894	Douglas Uggah Embas (GPS–PBB)
N38	Kalaka	7,327	Mohamad Duri (GPS–PBB)	3,893	72.43%	2,868	John Antau Linggang (PSB)	1,025	19.07%	5,375	Abdul Wahab Aziz (GPS–PBB)
N38	Kalaka	7,327	Mohamad Duri (GPS–PBB)	3,893	72.43%	2,868	Linang Chapum (PBK)	457	8.50%	5,375	Abdul Wahab Aziz (GPS–PBB)
N39	Krian	11,959	Friday Belik (GPS–PDP)	3,885	43.67%	932	Musa Dinggat (PSB)	2,953	33.19%	8,897	Ali Biju (PN–BERSATU)
N39	Krian	11,959	Friday Belik (GPS–PDP)	3,885	43.67%	932	Ali Biju (PN–BERSATU)	1,777	19.97%	8,897	Ali Biju (PN–BERSATU)
N39	Krian	11,959	Friday Belik (GPS–PDP)	3,885	43.67%	932	Danny Kuan Sam Sui (PBK)	282	3.17%	8,897	Ali Biju (PN–BERSATU)
N40	Kabong	9,287	Mohamad Chee Kadir (GPS–PBB)	4,789	67.32%	2,763	Wan Mohamad Madehi Wan Ali (PSB)	2,026	28.48%	7,114	Mohamad Chee Kadir (GPS–PBB)
N40	Kabong	9,287	Mohamad Chee Kadir (GPS–PBB)	4,789	67.32%	2,763	Mohamad Asri Kassim (PBK)	208	2.92%	7,114	Mohamad Chee Kadir (GPS–PBB)
N40	Kabong	9,287	Mohamad Chee Kadir (GPS–PBB)	4,789	67.32%	2,763	Andri Zulkarnaen Hamden (PH–AMANAH)	91	1.28%	7,114	Mohamad Chee Kadir (GPS–PBB)
N41	Kuala Rajang	10,259	Len Talif Salleh (GPS–PBB)	5,268	70.35%	3,325	Abang Aditajaya Abang Alwi (IND)	1,943	25.95%	7,488	Len Talif Salleh (GPS–PBB)
N41	Kuala Rajang	10,259	Len Talif Salleh (GPS–PBB)	5,268	70.35%	3,325	Abd Mutalip Abdullah (IND)	168	2.24%	7,488	Len Talif Salleh (GPS–PBB)
N41	Kuala Rajang	10,259	Len Talif Salleh (GPS–PBB)	5,268	70.35%	3,325	Wong Ling Ching (PBK)	109	1.46%	7,488	Len Talif Salleh (GPS–PBB)
N42	Semop	9,617	Abdullah Saidol (GPS–PBB)	4,338	64.58%	3,158	Abdul Raafidin Majidi (PSB)	1,180	17.57%	6,717	Abdullah Saidol (GPS–PBB)
N42	Semop	9,617	Abdullah Saidol (GPS–PBB)	4,338	64.58%	3,158	Mohamad Adenan Zulkeppli (IND)	811	12.07%	6,717	Abdullah Saidol (GPS–PBB)
N42	Semop	9,617	Abdullah Saidol (GPS–PBB)	4,338	64.58%	3,158	Mohamad Fadillah Sabali (PH–AMANAH)	270	4.02%	6,717	Abdullah Saidol (GPS–PBB)
N42	Semop	9,617	Abdullah Saidol (GPS–PBB)	4,338	64.58%	3,158	Jenny Wong Khing Ling (PBK)	118	1.76%	6,717	Abdullah Saidol (GPS–PBB)
N43	Daro	9,195	Safiee Ahmad (GPS–PBB)	5,317	93.19%	5,112	Jamal Ibrahim (IND)	205	3.59%	5,706	Safiee Ahmad (GPS–PBB)
N43	Daro	9,195	Safiee Ahmad (GPS–PBB)	5,317	93.19%	5,112	Ting Ing Hua (PBK)	184	3.22%	5,706	Safiee Ahmad (GPS–PBB)
N44	Jemoreng	9,963	Juanda Jaya (GPS–PBB)	5,623	86.80%	5,012	Osman Rafaie (IND)	611	9.43%	6,478	Juanda Jaya (GPS–PBB)
N44	Jemoreng	9,963	Juanda Jaya (GPS–PBB)	5,623	86.80%	5,012	Zainab Suhaili (PH–AMANAH)	244	3.77%	6,478	Juanda Jaya (GPS–PBB)
N45	Repok	23,541	Huang Tiong Sii (GPS–SUPP)	10,038	73.15%	7,308	Philip Wong Pak Ming (PH–DAP)	2,730	19.90%	13,722	Huang Tiong Sii (GPS–SUPP)
N45	Repok	23,541	Huang Tiong Sii (GPS–SUPP)	10,038	73.15%	7,308	Joseph Wong Kung King (PBK)	738	5.38%	13,722	Huang Tiong Sii (GPS–SUPP)
N45	Repok	23,541	Huang Tiong Sii (GPS–SUPP)	10,038	73.15%	7,308	Wong Chin King (GASAK–ASPIRASI)	216	1.57%	13,722	Huang Tiong Sii (GPS–SUPP)
N46	Meradong	18,156	Ding Kuong Hiing (GPS–SUPP)	6,827	58.23%	3,362	Hii Ru Yee (PSB)	3,465	29.56%	11,723	Ding Kuong Hiing (GPS–SUPP)
N46	Meradong	18,156	Ding Kuong Hiing (GPS–SUPP)	6,827	58.23%	3,362	Yong Siew Wei (PH–DAP)	809	6.90%	11,723	Ding Kuong Hiing (GPS–SUPP)
N46	Meradong	18,156	Ding Kuong Hiing (GPS–SUPP)	6,827	58.23%	3,362	Moh Hiong King (PBK)	622	5.31%	11,723	Ding Kuong Hiing (GPS–SUPP)
N47	Pakan	11,154	William Mawan Ikom (GPS–PBB)	3,268	41.13%	714	Tedong Gunda (IND)	2,554	32.15%	7,945	William Mawan Ikom (GPS–PBB)
N47	Pakan	11,154	William Mawan Ikom (GPS–PBB)	3,268	41.13%	714	Hareward Gramong Joseph Allen (PSB)	1,484	18.68%	7,945	William Mawan Ikom (GPS–PBB)
N47	Pakan	11,154	William Mawan Ikom (GPS–PBB)	3,268	41.13%	714	Brawi Anguong (IND)	506	6.37%	7,945	William Mawan Ikom (GPS–PBB)
N47	Pakan	11,154	William Mawan Ikom (GPS–PBB)	3,268	41.13%	714	Jemeli Kerah (PBK)	133	1.67%	7,945	William Mawan Ikom (GPS–PBB)
N48	Meluan	14,671	Rolland Duat Jubin (GPS–PDP)	5,269	53.21%	822	Elly Lawai Ngalai (PSB)	4,447	44.91%	9,902	Rolland Duat Jubin (GPS–PDP)
N48	Meluan	14,671	Rolland Duat Jubin (GPS–PDP)	5,269	53.21%	822	Abdul Hamid Siong (PBK)	186	1.88%	9,902	Rolland Duat Jubin (GPS–PDP)
N49	Ngemah	9,853	Anyi Jana (GPS–PRS)	3,193	46.22%	261	Joseph Jawa Kendawang (PSB)	2,932	42.45%	6,907	Alexander Vincent (GPS–PRS)
N49	Ngemah	9,853	Anyi Jana (GPS–PRS)	3,193	46.22%	261	Leo Bunsu (GASAK–PBDSB)	354	5.13%	6,907	Alexander Vincent (GPS–PRS)
N49	Ngemah	9,853	Anyi Jana (GPS–PRS)	3,193	46.22%	261	Satu Anchom (PH–PKR)	259	3.75%	6,907	Alexander Vincent (GPS–PRS)
N49	Ngemah	9,853	Anyi Jana (GPS–PRS)	3,193	46.22%	261	Charlie Genam (PBK)	169	2.45%	6,907	Alexander Vincent (GPS–PRS)
N50	Machan	11,763	Allan Siden Gramong (GPS–PBB)	4,155	53.67%	2,089	Madang Dimbab (PSB)	2,066	26.68%	7,743	Allan Siden Gramong (GPS–PBB)
N50	Machan	11,763	Allan Siden Gramong (GPS–PBB)	4,155	53.67%	2,089	Mohd Fauzi Abdullah @ Joseph Nyambong (PH–PKR)	1,267	16.36%	7,743	Allan Siden Gramong (GPS–PBB)
N50	Machan	11,763	Allan Siden Gramong (GPS–PBB)	4,155	53.67%	2,089	Mary Rita Mathias (PBK)	203	2.62%	7,743	Allan Siden Gramong (GPS–PBB)
N50	Machan	11,763	Allan Siden Gramong (GPS–PBB)	4,155	53.67%	2,089	Ngelayang Unau (GASAK–ASPIRASI)	52	0.67%	7,743	Allan Siden Gramong (GPS–PBB)
N51	Bukit Assek	27,634	Joseph Chieng Jin Ek (GPS–SUPP)	4,684	34.95%	874	Irene Mary Chang Oi Ling (PH–DAP)	3,810	28.42%	13,404	Irene Mary Chang Oi Ling (PH–DAP)
N51	Bukit Assek	27,634	Joseph Chieng Jin Ek (GPS–SUPP)	4,684	34.95%	874	Priscilla Lau (PBK)	2,598	19.38%	13,404	Irene Mary Chang Oi Ling (PH–DAP)
N51	Bukit Assek	27,634	Joseph Chieng Jin Ek (GPS–SUPP)	4,684	34.95%	874	Ting Kee Nguan (PSB)	1,790	13.35%	13,404	Irene Mary Chang Oi Ling (PH–DAP)
N51	Bukit Assek	27,634	Joseph Chieng Jin Ek (GPS–SUPP)	4,684	34.95%	874	Hii Tiong Huat (IND)	313	2.34%	13,404	Irene Mary Chang Oi Ling (PH–DAP)
N51	Bukit Assek	27,634	Joseph Chieng Jin Ek (GPS–SUPP)	4,684	34.95%	874	Jess Lau Kiu Ming (GASAK–ASPIRASI)	209	1.56%	13,404	Irene Mary Chang Oi Ling (PH–DAP)
N52	Dudong	33,054	Tiong King Sing (GPS–PDP)	9,390	46.99%	5,806	Wong Hie Ping (PSB)	3,584	17.93%	19,985	Tiong Thai King (PSB)
N52	Dudong	33,054	Tiong King Sing (GPS–PDP)	9,390	46.99%	5,806	Paul Ling Fong (PH–DAP)	2,724	13.63%	19,985	Tiong Thai King (PSB)
N52	Dudong	33,054	Tiong King Sing (GPS–PDP)	9,390	46.99%	5,806	Jane Lau Sing Wee (PBK)	1,779	8.90%	19,985	Tiong Thai King (PSB)
N52	Dudong	33,054	Tiong King Sing (GPS–PDP)	9,390	46.99%	5,806	Fadhil Mohamad Isa (IND)	1,178	5.89%	19,985	Tiong Thai King (PSB)
N52	Dudong	33,054	Tiong King Sing (GPS–PDP)	9,390	46.99%	5,806	Julius Enchana Jaspher Ancho (GASAK–PBDSB)	893	4.47%	19,985	Tiong Thai King (PSB)
N52	Dudong	33,054	Tiong King Sing (GPS–PDP)	9,390	46.99%	5,806	Engga Unchat (IND)	225	1.13%	19,985	Tiong Thai King (PSB)
N52	Dudong	33,054	Tiong King Sing (GPS–PDP)	9,390	46.99%	5,806	Josephine Lau Kiew Ping (GASAK–ASPIRASI)	212	1.06%	19,985	Tiong Thai King (PSB)
N53	Bawang Assan	19,610	Wong Soon Koh (PSB)	5,952	43.25%	913	Robert Lau Hui Yew (GPS–SUPP)	5,039	36.61%	13,763	Wong Soon Koh (PSB)
N53	Bawang Assan	19,610	Wong Soon Koh (PSB)	5,952	43.25%	913	Amy Lau Bik Yeing (PH–DAP)	1,173	8.52%	13,763	Wong Soon Koh (PSB)
N53	Bawang Assan	19,610	Wong Soon Koh (PSB)	5,952	43.25%	913	Michelle Ling Shyan Mih (PBK)	954	6.93%	13,763	Wong Soon Koh (PSB)
N53	Bawang Assan	19,610	Wong Soon Koh (PSB)	5,952	43.25%	913	Ricky Enteri (IND)	645	4.69%	13,763	Wong Soon Koh (PSB)
N54	Pelawan	33,910	Micheal Tiang Ming Tee (GPS–SUPP)	4,413	27.70%	100	David Wong Kee Woan (PH–DAP)	4,313	27.07%	15,931	David Wong Kee Woan (PH–DAP)
N54	Pelawan	33,910	Micheal Tiang Ming Tee (GPS–SUPP)	4,413	27.70%	100	Low Chong Nguan (PSB)	3,757	23.58%	15,931	David Wong Kee Woan (PH–DAP)
N54	Pelawan	33,910	Micheal Tiang Ming Tee (GPS–SUPP)	4,413	27.70%	100	Jamie Tiew Yen Houng (PBK)	3,146	19.75%	15,931	David Wong Kee Woan (PH–DAP)
N54	Pelawan	33,910	Micheal Tiang Ming Tee (GPS–SUPP)	4,413	27.70%	100	Janet Loh Wui Ping (GASAK–ASPIRASI)	302	1.90%	15,931	David Wong Kee Woan (PH–DAP)
N55	Nangka	21,011	Annuar Rapaee (GPS–PBB)	12,059	84.09%	10,804	Intanurazean Wan Sapuan Daud (PSB)	1,255	8.75%	14,341	Annuar Rapaee (GPS–PBB)
N55	Nangka	21,011	Annuar Rapaee (GPS–PBB)	12,059	84.09%	10,804	Olivia Lim Wen Sia (PBK)	1,027	7.16%	14,341	Annuar Rapaee (GPS–PBB)
N56	Dalat	12,417	Fatimah Abdullah (GPS–PBB)	7,085	93.90%	6,625	Salleh Mahali (PBK)	460	6.10%	7,545	Fatimah Abdullah (GPS–PBB)
N57	Tellian	9,927	Royston Valentine (GPS–PBB)	4,282	70.10%	2,917	Sait Junaidi (PSB)	1,365	22.35%	6,108	Yussibnosh Balo (GPS–PBB)
N57	Tellian	9,927	Royston Valentine (GPS–PBB)	4,282	70.10%	2,917	Mohd Arwin Lim Abdullah (PH–PKR)	287	4.70%	6,108	Yussibnosh Balo (GPS–PBB)
N57	Tellian	9,927	Royston Valentine (GPS–PBB)	4,282	70.10%	2,917	Zainuddin Budug (PBK)	174	2.85%	6,108	Yussibnosh Balo (GPS–PBB)
N58	Balingian	8,700	Abdul Yakub Arbi (GPS–PBB)	4,050	71.12%	2,904	Yusuf Abdul Rahman (PSB)	1,146	20.13%	5,694	Abdul Yakub Arbi (GPS–PBB)
N58	Balingian	8,700	Abdul Yakub Arbi (GPS–PBB)	4,050	71.12%	2,904	Abdul Jalil Bujang (PH–PKR)	498	8.75%	5,694	Abdul Yakub Arbi (GPS–PBB)
N59	Tamin	16,681	Christopher Gira Sambang (GPS–PRS)	7,778	64.99%	3,588	Joseph Entulu Belaun (PSB)	4,190	35.01%	11,968	Christopher Gira Sambang (GPS–PRS)
N60	Kakus	14,416	John Sikie Tayai (GPS–PRS)	5,307	52.35%	1,897	Peter Tuan (PSB)	3,410	33.64%	10,137	John Sikie Tayai (GPS–PRS)
N60	Kakus	14,416	John Sikie Tayai (GPS–PRS)	5,307	52.35%	1,897	Ugik Selipeh (IND)	546	5.39%	10,137	John Sikie Tayai (GPS–PRS)
N60	Kakus	14,416	John Sikie Tayai (GPS–PRS)	5,307	52.35%	1,897	Joshua Jabeng (PH–PKR)	375	3.70%	10,137	John Sikie Tayai (GPS–PRS)
N60	Kakus	14,416	John Sikie Tayai (GPS–PRS)	5,307	52.35%	1,897	Philip Kelanang Diung (PBK)	337	3.32%	10,137	John Sikie Tayai (GPS–PRS)
N60	Kakus	14,416	John Sikie Tayai (GPS–PRS)	5,307	52.35%	1,897	Tiun Kanun (IND)	162	1.60%	10,137	John Sikie Tayai (GPS–PRS)
N61	Pelagus	7,894	Wilson Nyabong Ijang (GPS–PRS)	2,843	56.29%	1,049	Kristoffer Nyuak Bajok (PSB)	1,794	35.52%	5,051	Wilson Nyabong Ijang (GPS–PRS)
N61	Pelagus	7,894	Wilson Nyabong Ijang (GPS–PRS)	2,843	56.29%	1,049	Solomon Kumbong (PH–DAP)	250	4.95%	5,051	Wilson Nyabong Ijang (GPS–PRS)
N61	Pelagus	7,894	Wilson Nyabong Ijang (GPS–PRS)	2,843	56.29%	1,049	Nyambong Sibat (PBK)	88	1.74%	5,051	Wilson Nyabong Ijang (GPS–PRS)
N61	Pelagus	7,894	Wilson Nyabong Ijang (GPS–PRS)	2,843	56.29%	1,049	Moses Ripai (GASAK–PBDSB)	76	1.50%	5,051	Wilson Nyabong Ijang (GPS–PRS)
N62	Katibas	10,137	Lidam Assan (GPS–PBB)	4,198	64.63%	2,997	Robertson Mawa Luat (PSB)	1,201	18.49%	6,496	Ambrose Blikau Enturan (GPS–PBB)
N62	Katibas	10,137	Lidam Assan (GPS–PBB)	4,198	64.63%	2,997	Munan Laja (PH–PKR)	763	11.75%	6,496	Ambrose Blikau Enturan (GPS–PBB)
N62	Katibas	10,137	Lidam Assan (GPS–PBB)	4,198	64.63%	2,997	Yunus Basri (PBK)	149	2.29%	6,496	Ambrose Blikau Enturan (GPS–PBB)
N62	Katibas	10,137	Lidam Assan (GPS–PBB)	4,198	64.63%	2,997	Tengku Gruna (IND)	123	1.89%	6,496	Ambrose Blikau Enturan (GPS–PBB)
N62	Katibas	10,137	Lidam Assan (GPS–PBB)	4,198	64.63%	2,997	Sai Malaka (GASAK–PBDSB)	62	0.95%	6,496	Ambrose Blikau Enturan (GPS–PBB)
N63	Bukit Goram	12,150	Jefferson Jamit Unyat (GPS–PBB)	4,253	68.45%	3,538	Joseph Jinggut (PH–DAP)	715	11.51%	6,213	Jefferson Jamit Unyat (GPS–PBB)
N63	Bukit Goram	12,150	Jefferson Jamit Unyat (GPS–PBB)	4,253	68.45%	3,538	Robert Segie (PSB)	689	11.09%	6,213	Jefferson Jamit Unyat (GPS–PBB)
N63	Bukit Goram	12,150	Jefferson Jamit Unyat (GPS–PBB)	4,253	68.45%	3,538	Puso Bujang (PBK)	297	4.78%	6,213	Jefferson Jamit Unyat (GPS–PBB)
N63	Bukit Goram	12,150	Jefferson Jamit Unyat (GPS–PBB)	4,253	68.45%	3,538	Robert Saweng (GASAK–PBDSB)	259	4.17%	6,213	Jefferson Jamit Unyat (GPS–PBB)
N64	Baleh	10,137	Nicholas Kudi Jantai (GPS–PRS)	3,541	61.85%	1,909	Koh Kumbong (PSB)	1,632	28.51%	5,725	VAC
N64	Baleh	10,137	Nicholas Kudi Jantai (GPS–PRS)	3,541	61.85%	1,909	Kenneth Usang George Lagong (PH–DAP)	470	8.21%	5,725	VAC
N64	Baleh	10,137	Nicholas Kudi Jantai (GPS–PRS)	3,541	61.85%	1,909	Irwan Iskandar Sukarno Abdullah @ Sukarno Layau (PBK)	82	1.43%	5,725	VAC
N65	Belaga	8,003	Liwan Lagang (GPS–PRS)	3,552	70.51%	2,245	Henry Usat Bit (PSB)	1,307	25.95%	5,037	Liwan Lagang (GPS–PRS)
N65	Belaga	8,003	Liwan Lagang (GPS–PRS)	3,552	70.51%	2,245	John Bampa (PBK)	97	1.93%	5,037	Liwan Lagang (GPS–PRS)
N65	Belaga	8,003	Liwan Lagang (GPS–PRS)	3,552	70.51%	2,245	Siki Balarik (IND)	81	1.61%	5,037	Liwan Lagang (GPS–PRS)
N66	Murum	9,738	Kennedy Chukpai Ugon (GPS–PRS)	4,584	66.23%	2,919	Stanley Ajang Batok (PSB)	1,665	24.06%	6,921	Chukpai Ugon (GPS–PRS)
N66	Murum	9,738	Kennedy Chukpai Ugon (GPS–PRS)	4,584	66.23%	2,919	Anie Amat (PH–PKR)	513	7.41%	6,921	Chukpai Ugon (GPS–PRS)
N66	Murum	9,738	Kennedy Chukpai Ugon (GPS–PRS)	4,584	66.23%	2,919	Kenneth Adan Silek (GASAK–PBDSB)	159	2.30%	6,921	Chukpai Ugon (GPS–PRS)
N67	Jepak	14,598	Talib Zulpilip (GPS–PBB)	6,277	69.45%	4,243	Raba'ah Tudin (PSB)	2,034	22.50%	9,039	Talib Zulpilip (GPS–PBB)
N67	Jepak	14,598	Talib Zulpilip (GPS–PBB)	6,277	69.45%	4,243	Stevenson Joseph Sumbang (PBK)	587	6.49%	9,039	Talib Zulpilip (GPS–PBB)
N67	Jepak	14,598	Talib Zulpilip (GPS–PBB)	6,277	69.45%	4,243	Tuah Kazan (IND)	141	1.56%	9,039	Talib Zulpilip (GPS–PBB)
N68	Tanjong Batu	22,391	Johny Pang Leong Ming (GPS–SUPP)	4,092	35.38%	23	Tony Chiew Chan Yew (PH–DAP)	4,069	35.18%	11,567	Chiew Chin Sing (PH–DAP)
N68	Tanjong Batu	22,391	Johny Pang Leong Ming (GPS–SUPP)	4,092	35.38%	23	Andy Yek Hock Siang (PBK)	2,204	19.05%	11,567	Chiew Chin Sing (PH–DAP)
N68	Tanjong Batu	22,391	Johny Pang Leong Ming (GPS–SUPP)	4,092	35.38%	23	Tang Eng Hui (PSB)	1,071	9.26%	11,567	Chiew Chin Sing (PH–DAP)
N68	Tanjong Batu	22,391	Johny Pang Leong Ming (GPS–SUPP)	4,092	35.38%	23	Chieng Lea Phing (GASAK–ASPIRASI)	93	0.80%	11,567	Chiew Chin Sing (PH–DAP)
N68	Tanjong Batu	22,391	Johny Pang Leong Ming (GPS–SUPP)	4,092	35.38%	23	Wong Hau Ming (IND)	38	0.33%	11,567	Chiew Chin Sing (PH–DAP)
N69	Kemena	14,252	Stephen Rundi Utom (GPS–PBB)	6,339	62.83%	3,611	Bernard Tahim Bael (PSB)	2,728	27.03%	10,091	Stephen Rundi Utom (GPS–PBB)
N69	Kemena	14,252	Stephen Rundi Utom (GPS–PBB)	6,339	62.83%	3,611	John Brian Anthony (PH–DAP)	399	3.95%	10,091	Stephen Rundi Utom (GPS–PBB)
N69	Kemena	14,252	Stephen Rundi Utom (GPS–PBB)	6,339	62.83%	3,611	Jame Stephen (IND)	331	3.28%	10,091	Stephen Rundi Utom (GPS–PBB)
N69	Kemena	14,252	Stephen Rundi Utom (GPS–PBB)	6,339	62.83%	3,611	Chelea Vanessa William (PBK)	294	2.91%	10,091	Stephen Rundi Utom (GPS–PBB)
N70	Samalaju	17,541	Majang Renggi (GPS–PRS)	7,547	67.06%	6,043	Tonny Ung (PH–DAP)	1,504	13.36%	11,255	Majang Renggi (GPS–PRS)
N70	Samalaju	17,541	Majang Renggi (GPS–PRS)	7,547	67.06%	6,043	Reggie Suel (PSB)	1,496	13.29%	11,255	Majang Renggi (GPS–PRS)
N70	Samalaju	17,541	Majang Renggi (GPS–PRS)	7,547	67.06%	6,043	Leighton Manjah (PBK)	509	4.52%	11,255	Majang Renggi (GPS–PRS)
N70	Samalaju	17,541	Majang Renggi (GPS–PRS)	7,547	67.06%	6,043	Baba Emperan (GASAK–PBDSB)	199	1.77%	11,255	Majang Renggi (GPS–PRS)
N71	Bekenu	12,643	Rosey Yunus (GPS–PBB)	6,354	79.58%	5,397	Norhafizah Joharie (PH–PKR)	957	11.99%	7,984	Rosey Yunus (GPS–PBB)
N71	Bekenu	12,643	Rosey Yunus (GPS–PBB)	6,354	79.58%	5,397	Abu Bakar Amit (PSB)	377	4.72%	7,984	Rosey Yunus (GPS–PBB)
N71	Bekenu	12,643	Rosey Yunus (GPS–PBB)	6,354	79.58%	5,397	Desmond Gani (PBK)	296	3.71%	7,984	Rosey Yunus (GPS–PBB)
N72	Lambir	19,208	Ripin Lamat (GPS–PBB)	6,860	68.02%	5,562	Lila Mohamad (PSB)	1,298	12.87%	10,086	Ripin Lamat (GPS–PBB)
N72	Lambir	19,208	Ripin Lamat (GPS–PBB)	6,860	68.02%	5,562	Zulhaidah Suboh (PH–PKR)	1,139	11.29%	10,086	Ripin Lamat (GPS–PBB)
N72	Lambir	19,208	Ripin Lamat (GPS–PBB)	6,860	68.02%	5,562	Dyanne Oshield Nickson (PBK)	789	7.82%	10,086	Ripin Lamat (GPS–PBB)
N73	Piasau	20,978	Sebastian Ting Chiew Yew (GPS–SUPP)	6,790	66.61%	4,988	Peter Hee Leh Keng (PH–DAP)	1,802	17.68%	10,194	Sebastian Ting Chiew Yew (GPS–SUPP)
N73	Piasau	20,978	Sebastian Ting Chiew Yew (GPS–SUPP)	6,790	66.61%	4,988	Teo Jia Jun (PSB)	816	8.00%	10,194	Sebastian Ting Chiew Yew (GPS–SUPP)
N73	Piasau	20,978	Sebastian Ting Chiew Yew (GPS–SUPP)	6,790	66.61%	4,988	Chung Siew Yen (PBK)	665	6.52%	10,194	Sebastian Ting Chiew Yew (GPS–SUPP)
N73	Piasau	20,978	Sebastian Ting Chiew Yew (GPS–SUPP)	6,790	66.61%	4,988	Hanim Jaraee (GASAK–ASPIRASI)	121	1.19%	10,194	Sebastian Ting Chiew Yew (GPS–SUPP)
N74	Pujut	27,559	Adam Yii Siew Sang (GPS–SUPP)	5,558	44.85%	1,566	Alan Ling Sie Kiong (PH–DAP)	3,992	32.22%	12,391	VAC
N74	Pujut	27,559	Adam Yii Siew Sang (GPS–SUPP)	5,558	44.85%	1,566	Bruce Chai Khim Cheong (PSB)	1,667	13.45%	12,391	VAC
N74	Pujut	27,559	Adam Yii Siew Sang (GPS–SUPP)	5,558	44.85%	1,566	Leslie Ting Siong Ngiap (PBK)	1,022	8.25%	12,391	VAC
N74	Pujut	27,559	Adam Yii Siew Sang (GPS–SUPP)	5,558	44.85%	1,566	Chin Fen Siong (GASAK–ASPIRASI)	152	1.23%	12,391	VAC
N75	Senadin	33,479	Lee Kim Shin (GPS–SUPP)	10,535	62.31%	7,591	Marcus Hugo (PH–DAP)	2,944	17.41%	16,909	Lee Kim Shin (GPS–SUPP)
N75	Senadin	33,479	Lee Kim Shin (GPS–SUPP)	10,535	62.31%	7,591	Lee Tze Ha (PSB)	1,896	11.21%	16,909	Lee Kim Shin (GPS–SUPP)
N75	Senadin	33,479	Lee Kim Shin (GPS–SUPP)	10,535	62.31%	7,591	Ngieng Sheng Chung (PBK)	1,023	6.05%	16,909	Lee Kim Shin (GPS–SUPP)
N75	Senadin	33,479	Lee Kim Shin (GPS–SUPP)	10,535	62.31%	7,591	Bobby William (GASAK–PBDSB)	511	3.02%	16,909	Lee Kim Shin (GPS–SUPP)
N76	Marudi	16,395	Penguang Manggil (GPS–PBB)	8,169	74.54%	5,976	Sylvester Entri Muran (PSB)	2,193	20.01%	10,960	Penguang Manggil (GPS–PBB)
N76	Marudi	16,395	Penguang Manggil (GPS–PBB)	8,169	74.54%	5,976	Elias Lipi Mat (PH–PKR)	373	3.40%	10,960	Penguang Manggil (GPS–PBB)
N76	Marudi	16,395	Penguang Manggil (GPS–PBB)	8,169	74.54%	5,976	Sawing Kedit (GASAK–PBDSB)	124	1.13%	10,960	Penguang Manggil (GPS–PBB)
N76	Marudi	16,395	Penguang Manggil (GPS–PBB)	8,169	74.54%	5,976	Gilbert Young (PBK)	101	0.92%	10,960	Penguang Manggil (GPS–PBB)
N77	Telang Usan	11,465	Dennis Ngau (GPS–PBB)	3,861	59.76%	2,422	Jau Jok @ Jenggo (PSB)	1,439	22.27%	6,461	Dennis Ngau (GPS–PBB)
N77	Telang Usan	11,465	Dennis Ngau (GPS–PBB)	3,861	59.76%	2,422	Philip Jau Ding (PH–PKR)	1,093	16.92%	6,461	Dennis Ngau (GPS–PBB)
N77	Telang Usan	11,465	Dennis Ngau (GPS–PBB)	3,861	59.76%	2,422	Gia Bala (PBK)	68	1.05%	6,461	Dennis Ngau (GPS–PBB)
N78	Mulu	9,572	Gerawat Gala (GPS–PBB)	3,731	66.67%	2,875	Son Radu (PSB)	856	15.30%	5,596	Gerawat Gala (GPS–PBB)
N78	Mulu	9,572	Gerawat Gala (GPS–PBB)	3,731	66.67%	2,875	Roland Engan (PH–PKR)	810	14.47%	5,596	Gerawat Gala (GPS–PBB)
N78	Mulu	9,572	Gerawat Gala (GPS–PBB)	3,731	66.67%	2,875	Richard Ibuh (PBK)	199	3.56%	5,596	Gerawat Gala (GPS–PBB)
N79	Bukit Kota	16,576	Abdul Rahman Ismail (GPS–PBB)	6,454	78.80%	4,986	Rosli Amat (PSB)	1,468	17.92%	8,190	Abdul Rahman Ismail (GPS–PBB)
N79	Bukit Kota	16,576	Abdul Rahman Ismail (GPS–PBB)	6,454	78.80%	4,986	Lim Lian Hun (PBK)	206	2.52%	8,190	Abdul Rahman Ismail (GPS–PBB)
N79	Bukit Kota	16,576	Abdul Rahman Ismail (GPS–PBB)	6,454	78.80%	4,986	Herun Bungsu (IND)	62	0.76%	8,190	Abdul Rahman Ismail (GPS–PBB)
N80	Batu Danau	9,368	Paulus Palu Gumbang (GPS–PBB)	3,030	53.14%	706	Ali Adap (PSB)	2,324	40.76%	5,702	Paulus Palu Gumbang (GPS–PBB)
N80	Batu Danau	9,368	Paulus Palu Gumbang (GPS–PBB)	3,030	53.14%	706	Racha Balang (PH–PKR)	268	4.70%	5,702	Paulus Palu Gumbang (GPS–PBB)
N80	Batu Danau	9,368	Paulus Palu Gumbang (GPS–PBB)	3,030	53.14%	706	Petrus Bulan (PBK)	80	1.40%	5,702	Paulus Palu Gumbang (GPS–PBB)
N81	Ba'kelalan	8,503	Baru Bian (PSB)	2,687	54.65%	680	Sam Laya (GPS–PDP)	2,007	40.83%	4,916	Baru Bian (PSB)
N81	Ba'kelalan	8,503	Baru Bian (PSB)	2,687	54.65%	680	Peter @ Pita Asut (PBK)	110	2.24%	4,916	Baru Bian (PSB)
N81	Ba'kelalan	8,503	Baru Bian (PSB)	2,687	54.65%	680	Martin Samuel Labo (PH–PKR)	57	1.16%	4,916	Baru Bian (PSB)
N81	Ba'kelalan	8,503	Baru Bian (PSB)	2,687	54.65%	680	Agnes Padan (IND)	55	1.12%	4,916	Baru Bian (PSB)
N82	Bukit Sari	12,935	Awang Tengah Ali Hasan (GPS–PBB)	6,385	87.48%	5,636	Alias Mail (PSB)	749	10.26%	7,299	Awang Tengah Ali Hasan (GPS–PBB)
N82	Bukit Sari	12,935	Awang Tengah Ali Hasan (GPS–PBB)	6,385	87.48%	5,636	Riyah Basrah (PBK)	165	2.26%	7,299	Awang Tengah Ali Hasan (GPS–PBB)
Source: The Election Commission
