= Christopher Gira Sambang =

Malaysian politician

Yang Berhormat Christopher Gira Sambang MLA

Member of the Sarawak State Legislative Assembly for Tamin
- Incumbent
- Assumed office 2016
- Preceded by: Joseph Mauh Ikeh

Personal details
- Born: Christopher Gira anak Sambang Sarawak
- Citizenship: Malaysian
- Party: PRS
- Other political affiliations: Barisan Nasional (till 2018); Gabungan Parti Sarawak (since 2018)
- Spouse: Anita Ijan
- Education: University of Glasgow
- Occupation: Politician
- Profession: Engineer

Christopher Gira anak Sambang is a Malaysian politician from PRS. He has served as the Member of the Sarawak State Legislative Assembly for Tamin since 2016.

== Political career ==
In 2025, Christopher defeated Kennedy Chukpai Ugon, Member of the Sarawak State Legislative Assembly for Murum, to become Chief of PRS Youth Wing.

== Election results ==
Sarawak State Legislative Assembly
Year	Constituency	Candidate	Votes	Pct.	Opponent(s)	Votes	Pct.	Ballots cast	Majority	Turnout
2016	N59 Tamin	Christopher Gira Sambang (PRS)	6,230	54.99%	Ali Puji (IND)	4,145	36.59%	11,508	2,085	76.99%
2016	N59 Tamin	Christopher Gira Sambang (PRS)	6,230	54.99%	Simon Joseph (PKR)	954	8.42%	11,508	2,085	76.99%
2021	N59 Tamin	Christopher Gira Sambang (PRS)	7,778	64.99%	Joseph Entulu Belaun (PSB)	4,190	35.01%	2,144	3,588	72.80%
