= Selangau (federal constituency) =

Federal constituency of Sarawak, Malaysia

Selangau (P214)
Sarawak constituency

Federal constituency
- Legislature: Dewan Rakyat
- MP: Edwin Banta; GPS
- Constituency created: 1987
- First contested: 1990
- Last contested: 2022

Demographics
- Population (2020): 51,335
- Electors (2022): 45,743
- Area (km²): 9,193
- Pop. density (per km²): 5.6

Selangau is a federal constituency in Sibu Division (Selangau District), Mukah Division (Mukah District) and Bintulu Division (Tatau District), Sarawak, Malaysia, that has been represented in the Dewan Rakyat since 1990.

The federal constituency was created in the 1987 redistribution and is mandated to return a single member to the Dewan Rakyat under the first past the post voting system.

== Demographics ==
https://ge15.orientaldaily.com.my/seats/sarawak/p

Ethnic breakdown of Selangau's electorate as of 2022
1. Sarawak bumiputera (92.2%)
2. Chinese (4.00%)
3. Malay-Muslim bumiputera (2.90%)
4. Other ethnicities (0.90%)

As of 2020, Selangau has a population of 51,335 people.

Age breakdown of Selangau's electorate as of 2022
1. 18-20 (7.52%)
2. 21-29 (21.7%)
3. 30-39 (20.7%)
4. 40-49 (17.6%)
5. 50-59 (15.3%)
6. 60-69 (9.75%)
7. 70-79 (4.70%)
8. 80-89 (1.77%)
9. above 90 (0.85%)
Gender breakdown of Selangau's electorate as of 2022
1. Male (50.6%)
2. Female (49.4%)

== History ==
=== Polling districts ===
According to the gazette issued on 31 October 2022, the Selangau constituency has a total of 30 polling districts.

State constituency	Polling Districts	Code	Location
Tamin（N59）	Siong	214/59/01	SK Ulu Siong; SMK Luar Bandar No. 1; SK Siong Tengah; SK Sg. Siong
Tamin（N59）	Tamin	214/59/02	RH Jangit Anak Lantieng; SK Bt. 36; SK St Mark; SK Ng. Tajam
Tamin（N59）	Sekuau	214/59/03	SK Penghulu Imban; RH Sarikei; RH Lanting Anak Buda; Dewan Masyarakat Sekuau; SK Sg. Pakoh Ng. Selabi; RH Tujoh Bejait Ulu Oya
Tamin（N59）	Selangau	214/59/04	SK Sg. Arau Ulu Mukah; RH Tegong Ulu Selangau; SK Ng. Kua; RH Pengarah Ng. Selabi; SJK (C) Tong Ah; RH Jarau Sg. Kua Batu 43 Jln. Sibu / Bintulu
Tamin（N59）	Lemai	214/59/05	SK Sg. Buloh; SK Sg. Sepiring Batu 62 Jln. Sibu /Tatau; SK Kuala Lemai; SMK Ulu Balingian; SK Sg. Kemena; SK Kuala Pelugau
Kakus (N60)	Bawan	214/60/01	SK Sungai Duan
Kakus (N60)	Arip	214/60/02	SK Sg. Anak; RH Jilum Ng. Bawang; SK Sg. Tau; SK Sg. Bawang; SK Ulu Arip; SK Iban Union
Kakus (N60)	Tatau-Buan	214/60/03	SK Tatau
Kakus (N60)	Kakus	214/60/04	SK RH Kesing Tatau
Kakus (N60)	Anap	214/60/05	RH Merayang Ng. Malat
Kakus (N60)	Tatau	214/60/06	SJK (C) Chung Hua Tatau
Kakus (N60)	Lubok Kempai	214/60/07	SK RH Tayai
Kakus (N60)	Bekiran	214/60/08	RH Wilson Blue Rantau Belak
Kakus (N60)	Tekalit	214/60/09	SK Sg. Bagian
Kakus (N60)	Rungan	214/60/10	RH Pandong Ng. Kakus
Kakus (N60)	Giri	214/60/11	RH Giri Sg. Senunok
Kakus (N60)	Kelebu	214/60/12	RH Jimbai Ng. kelebu
Kakus (N60)	Entajum	214/60/13	RH Radin Entajum
Kakus (N60)	Ulu Sangan	214/60/14	RH Ngindang Anak Guan (Ulu Sangan)
Kakus (N60)	Sangan	214/60/15	SK Sangan Iban
Kakus (N60)	Penyarai	214/60/16	SK Kuala Penyarai Kakus
Kakus (N60)	Kuala Belungai	214/60/17	RH Edwin Ng. Kulau Kakus; RH Natok Bilong
Kakus (N60)	Muput	214/60/18	RH Agau Sg. Muput
Kakus (N60)	Pasir Nangka	214/60/19	SK RH Barrau
Kakus (N60)	Nangka Empang	214/60/20	RH Ahsoon Ng. Empang
Kakus (N60)	Kana	214/60/21	SK Kuala Muput
Kakus (N60)	Setusor	214/60/22	RH Jemat Ng. Setusor
Kakus (N60)	Tau	214/60/23	SK Ng. Tau
Kakus (N60)	Takan	214/60/24	RH Enteri Ng. Takan
Kakus (N60)	Annau	214/60/25	Tadika Kemas RH Mat Separai; SK Kelawit

=== Representation history ===
Members of Parliament for Selangau
Parliament	No	Years	Member	Party	Vote Share
Constituency created from Mukah, Rajang and Bintulu
8th	P174	1990–1995	Joseph Mauh Ikeh	Independent	5,443; 49.66%
9th	P186	1995-1999	Joseph Mauh Ikeh	BN (PBDS)	8,021; 72.07%
10th	P187	1999–2004	Joseph Mauh Ikeh	BN (PRS)	7,612; 65.58%
11th	P213	2004–2008	Joseph Entulu Belaun	BN (PRS)	7,876; 64.90%
12th	P214	2008–2013	Joseph Entulu Belaun	BN (PRS)	Uncontested
13th	P214	2013-2018	Joseph Entulu Belaun	BN (PRS)	12,040; 58.97%
13th	P214	2018	Joseph Entulu Belaun	Independent	12,040; 58.97%
14th	P214	2018–2020	Baru Bian	PH (PKR)	11,228; 51.11%
14th	P214	2020	Baru Bian	Independent	11,228; 51.11%
14th	P214	2020–2022	Baru Bian	PSB	11,228; 51.11%
15th	P214	2022–present	Edwin Banta	GPS (PRS)	16,078; 55.83%

=== State constituency ===
Parliamentary constituency	State constituency					
Parliamentary constituency	1969–1978	1978–1990	1990–1999	1999–2008	2008–2016	2016−present
Selangau			Kakus			
Selangau			Tamin			

=== Historical boundaries ===
State Constituency	Area			
State Constituency	1987	1996	2005	2015
Kakus	Sungai Arip; Kakus; Kuala Belugai; Takan; Tatau			Kelawit; Kakus; Kuala Belugai; Takan; Tatau
Tamin	Kuala Pelugau; Sekuau; Selangau; Tamin; Ulu Siong			

=== Current state assembly members ===
No.	State Constituency	Member	Party (coalition)
N59	Tamin	Christopher Gira Sambang	GPS (PRS)
N60	Kakus	John Sikie Tayai	GPS (PRS)

=== Local governments & postcodes ===
No.	State Constituency	Local Government	Postcode
N59	Tamin	Sibu Rural District Council	96000 Sibu; 96350 Balingian; 96400 Mukah; 97200 Tatau
N60	Kakus	Dalat & Mukah District Council (Bawan and Arip areas); Sibu Rural District Council; Bintulu Development Authority (Annau area)	96000 Sibu; 96350 Balingian; 96400 Mukah; 97200 Tatau

== Election results ==
Malaysian general election, 2022
Party	Candidate	Votes	%	∆%
GPS	Edwin Banta	16,078	55.83	▲55.83
PH	Umpang Sabang	11,092	38.52	▲38.52
Independent	Henry Joseph Usau	1,626	5.25	▲5.25
Total valid votes		28,796	100.00	
Total rejected ballots		428		
Unreturned ballots		56		
Turnout		29,280	62.95	▼11.49
Registered electors		45,743		
Majority		4,986	17.31	▲15.10
GPS gain from PKR		Swing		?
Source(s) https://lom.agc.gov.my/ilims/upload/portal/akta/outputp/1753265/PARLIMEN%20SARAWAK%20(PUB%20620).pdf

Malaysian general election, 2018
Party	Candidate	Votes	%	∆%
PKR	Baru Bian	11,228	51.11	▲32.05
BN	Rita Sarimah Patrick Insol	10,742	48.89	▼10.08
Total valid votes		21,970	100.00	
Total rejected ballots		334		
Unreturned ballots		48		
Turnout		22,352	74.44	▼7.07
Registered electors		30,026		
Majority		486	2.21	▼34.79
PKR gain from BN		Swing		?
Source(s) "His Majesty's Government Gazette - Notice of Contested Election, Parliament for the State of Sarawak [P.U. (B) 247/2018]" (PDF). Attorney General's Chambers of Malaysia. 3 May 2018. "Federal Government Gazette - Results of Contested Election and Statements of the Poll after the Official Addition of Votes, Parliamentary Constituencies for the State of Sarawak [P.U. (B) 321/2018]" (PDF). Attorney General's Chambers of Malaysia. 28 May 2018. Archived from the original (PDF) on 2019-12-29.

Malaysian general election, 2013
Party	Candidate	Votes	%	∆%
BN	Joseph Entulu Belaun	12,040	58.97	▲58.97
Sarawak Workers Party	Sng Chee Hua	4,485	21.97	▲21.97
PKR	Joshua Jabeng	3,891	19.06	▲19.06
Total valid votes		20,416	100.00	
Total rejected ballots		309		
Unreturned ballots		28		
Turnout		20,753	81.51	
Registered electors		25,461		
Majority		7,555	37.00	
BN hold		Swing		
Source(s) "Federal Government Gazette - Notice of Contested Election, Parliament for the State of Sarawak [P.U. (B) 184/2013]" (PDF). Attorney General's Chambers of Malaysia. 26 April 2013. Archived from the original (PDF) on 2018-09-30. "Federal Government Gazette - Results of Contested Election and Statements of the Poll after the Official Addition of Votes, Parliamentary Constituencies for the State of Sarawak [P.U. (B) 225/2013]" (PDF). Attorney General's Chambers of Malaysia. 22 May 2013.

Malaysian general election, 2008
Party	Candidate	Votes	%	∆%
On the nomination day, Joseph Entulu Belaun won uncontested.
BN	Joseph Entulu Belaun			
Total valid votes			100.00	
Total rejected ballots				
Unreturned ballots				
Turnout				
Registered electors				
Majority				
BN hold		Swing		

Malaysian general election, 2004
Party	Candidate	Votes	%	∆%
BN	Joseph Entulu Belaun	7,876	64.90	▼0.68
SNAP	Liman Sujang	4,260	35.10	▲35.10
Total valid votes		12,136	100.00	
Total rejected ballots		237		
Unreturned ballots		3		
Turnout		12,376	60.49	▼0.19
Registered electors		20,459		
Majority		3,616	29.80	▼1.36
BN hold		Swing		

Malaysian general election, 1999
Party	Candidate	Votes	%	∆%
BN	Joseph Mauh Ikeh	7,612	65.58	▼6.49
PKR	Ricky Bernard Betti	3,995	34.42	▲34.42
Total valid votes		11,607	100.00	
Total rejected ballots		327		
Unreturned ballots		14		
Turnout		11,948	60.68	▲2.21
Registered electors		19,689		
Majority		3,617	31.16	▼12.98
BN hold		Swing		

Malaysian general election, 1995
Party	Candidate	Votes	%	∆%
BN	Joseph Mauh Ikeh	8,021	72.07	▲31.76
Independent	Munan John Andrew	3,108	27.93	▲27.93
Total valid votes		11,129	100.00	
Total rejected ballots		322		
Unreturned ballots		58		
Turnout		11,509	58.47	▼7.50
Registered electors		19,683		
Majority		4,913	44.14	▲34.79
BN gain from Independent		Swing		?

Malaysian general election, 1990
Party	Candidate	Votes	%
Independent	Joseph Mauh Ikeh	5,443	49.66
BN	Jerome Runggol	4,418	40.31
Independent	Linton Albert	1,099	10.03
Total valid votes		10,960	100.00
Total rejected ballots		235	
Unreturned ballots		0	
Turnout		11,195	65.97
Registered electors		16,971	
Majority		1,025	9.35
This was a new constituency created.
