= Kennedy Chukpai Ugon =

Malaysian politician

Yang Berhormat Kennedy Chukpai Ugon MLA KMN

Member of the Sarawak State Legislative Assembly for Murum
- Incumbent
- Assumed office 2016
- Preceded by: Constituency created

Personal details
- Born: Kennedy Chukpai anak Ugon Sarawak
- Citizenship: Malaysian
- Party: PRS
- Other political affiliations: Barisan Nasional (till 2018); Gabungan Parti Sarawak (since 2018)
- Education: Universiti Teknologi MARA
- Occupation: Politician

Kennedy Chukpai anak Ugon is a Malaysian politician from PRS. He has served as the Member of the Sarawak State Legislative Assembly for Murum since 2016.

== Political career ==
In 2025, he lost the party contest for Chief of PRS Youth Wing to Christopher Gira Sambang, Member of the Sarawak State Legislative Assembly for Tamin.

== Election results ==
Sarawak State Legislative Assembly
Year	Constituency	Candidate	Votes	Pct.	Opponent(s)	Votes	Pct.	Ballots cast	Majority	Turnout
2016	N66 Murum	Kennedy Chukpai Ugon (PRS)	3,265	54.00%	Abun Sui Anyit (PKR)	1,065	17.61%	6,219	2,200	75.45%
2016	N66 Murum	Kennedy Chukpai Ugon (PRS)	3,265	54.00%	Stanley Ajang Batok (IND)	1,029	17.02%	6,219	2,200	75.45%
2016	N66 Murum	Kennedy Chukpai Ugon (PRS)	3,265	54.00%	Mathew Silek (DAP)	687	11.36%	6,219	2,200	75.45%
2021	N66 Murum	Kennedy Chukpai Ugon (PRS)	4,584	66.23%	Stanley Ajang Batok (PSB)	1,665	24.06%	7,006	2,919	71.94%
2021	N66 Murum	Kennedy Chukpai Ugon (PRS)	4,584	66.23%	Ani Amat (PKR)	513	7.41%	7,006	2,919	71.94%
2021	N66 Murum	Kennedy Chukpai Ugon (PRS)	4,584	66.23%	Kenneth Adan Silek (PBDS Baru)	159	2.30%	7,006	2,919	71.94%

== Honours ==
- Malaysia :
  - Officer of the Order of the Defender of the Realm (KMN) (2021)
