= Anyi Jana =

Malaysian politician

Yang Berhormat Anyi Jana MLA

Member of the Sarawak State Legislative Assembly for Ngemah
- Incumbent
- Assumed office 2021
- Preceded by: Alexander Vincent

Personal details
- Born: Anyi anak Jana Sarawak
- Citizenship: Malaysian
- Party: PRS
- Other political affiliations: Gabungan Parti Sarawak
- Occupation: Politician

Anyi anak Jana is a Malaysian politician from PRS. He has served as the Member of the Sarawak State Legislative Assembly for Ngemah since 2021.

== Election results ==
Sarawak State Legislative Assembly
Year	Constituency	Candidate	Votes	Pct.	Opponent(s)	Votes	Pct.	Ballots cast	Majority	Turnout
2021	N49 Ngemah	Anyi Jana (PRS)	3,193	46.23%	Joseph Jawa Kendawang (PSB)	2,932	42.45%	7,045	261	71.50%
2021	N49 Ngemah	Anyi Jana (PRS)	3,193	46.23%	Leo Bunsu (PBDS Baru)	354	5.13	7,045	261	71.50%
2021	N49 Ngemah	Anyi Jana (PRS)	3,193	46.23%	Satu Anchom (PKR)	259	3.75	7,045	261	71.50%
2021	N49 Ngemah	Anyi Jana (PRS)	3,193	46.23%	Charlie Genam (PBK)	169	2.45	7,045	261	71.50%
