= Bukit Assek =

State electoral district in Sarawak, Malaysia

Bukit Assek (N51)
Sarawak constituency

State constituency
- Legislature: Sarawak State Legislative Assembly
MLA
Vacant
- Constituency created: 1987
- First contested: 1991
- Last contested: 2026

Bukit Assek is a state constituency in Sarawak, Malaysia, that has been represented in the Sarawak State Legislative Assembly since 1991.

The state constituency was created in the 1987 redistribution and is mandated to return a single member to the Sarawak State Legislative Assembly under the first past the post voting system.

== Demographics ==
Ethnic breakdown of Bukit Assek's electorate as of 2022
1. Chinese (84.3%)
2. Sarawak bumiputera (8.40%)
3. Malay-Muslim bumiputera (6.90%)
4. Other ethnicities (0.40%)

== History ==
As of 2020, Bukit Assek has a population of 37,666 people.

=== Polling districts ===
According to the gazette issued on 31 October 2022, the Bukit Assek constituency has a total of 14 polling districts.

State constituency	Polling Districts	Code	Location
Bukit Assek (N51)	Tiong Hua	211/51/01	SK Perbandaran Sibu No.4 Jln. Oya
Bukit Assek (N51)	Tong Sang	211/51/02	SJK (C) Sacred Heart Chinese Jln. Bukit Assek
Bukit Assek (N51)	Keladi	211/51/03	SJK (C) Hang Kwong; SK Ng. Salim; SJK (C) Sung Sang; SMK Bukit Assek
Bukit Assek (N51)	Kapor Lima	211/51/04	SJK (C) Chung Sing
Bukit Assek (N51)	Lembangan	211/51/05	SK St. Rita
Bukit Assek (N51)	Uk Daik	211/51/06	SMK Katolik
Bukit Assek (N51)	Hardin	211/51/07	SJK (C) Uk Daik
Bukit Assek (N51)	Lai Chee	211/51/08	SMK St Elizabeth
Bukit Assek (N51)	Merlin	211/51/09	SMK St Elizabeth
Bukit Assek (N51)	Hua Kiew	211/51/10	SMK Sacred Heart
Bukit Assek (N51)	Hin Yu	211/51/11	SMK Methodist
Bukit Assek (N51)	Layang-Layang	211/51/12	SK Sacred Heart
Bukit Assek (N51)	Manggis	211/51/13	SK Sacred Heart
Bukit Assek (N51)	Maling	211/51/14	SMK Sacred Heart

=== Representation history ===
Members of the Legislative Assembly for Bukit Assek
Assembly	No	Years	Member	Party
Constituency created from Maling
13th	N38	1991-1996	Wong Soon Kai (黃順開)	BN (SUPP)
14th	N39	1996-2001	Wong Ho Leng (黃和聯)	DAP
15th	N39	2001-2006	Daniel Ngieng Kiong Ann (嚴建安)	BN (SUPP)
16th	N45	2006-2011	Wong Ho Leng (黃和聯)	PR (DAP)
17th	N45	2011–2014	Wong Ho Leng (黃和聯)	PR (DAP)
17th	N45	2014-2016	Vacant	
18th	N51	2016-2021	Irene Mary Chang Oi Ling (鄭愛鴒)	PH (DAP)
19th	N51	2021–2026	Joseph Chieng Jin Ek (錢進一)	GPS (SUPP)

== Election results ==
Sarawak state election, 2026: Bukit Assek
Party	Candidate	Votes	%	∆%
GPS				▲
DAP	Stanley Chiew Sung Ngie			▲
Total valid votes				
Total rejected ballots				
Unreturned ballots				
Turnout				
Registered electors				
Majority				

Sarawak state election, 2021: Bukit Assek
Party	Candidate	Votes	%	∆%
GPS	Chieng Jin Ek	4,684	34.94	▲34.94
DAP	Irene Chang	3,810	28.42	▼32.63
PBK	Priscilla Lau	2,598	19.38	▲19.38
PSB	Ting Kee Nguan	1,790	13.35	▲13.35
Independent	Hii Tiong Huat	313	2.34	▲1.36
ASPIRASI	Jess Lau Kiu Ming	209	1.56	▲1.56
Total valid votes		13,404	100.00	
Total rejected ballots		144		
Unreturned ballots		73		
Turnout		13,621	49.29	▼17.33
Registered electors		27,636		
Majority		874	6.52	▼17.58
GPS gain from DAP		Swing		?
Source(s) https://lom.agc.gov.my/ilims/upload/portal/akta/outputp/1718688/PUB687.pdf

Sarawak state election, 2016: Bukit Assek
Party	Candidate	Votes	%	∆%
DAP	Irene Chang	11,392	61.05	▼12.44
BN	Chieng Buong Toon	6,895	36.95	▲11.42
STAR	Moh Hiong King	374	2.00	▲2.00
Total valid votes		18,661	100.00	
Total rejected ballots		180		
Unreturned ballots		40		
Turnout		18,881	66.62	▼2.15
Registered electors		28,341		
Majority		4,497	24.10	▼23.85
DAP hold		Swing		
Source(s) "Federal Government Gazette - Notice of Contested Election, State Legislative Assembly of the State of Sarawak [P.U. (B) 190/2016]" (PDF). Attorney General's Chambers of Malaysia. 25 April 2016. Archived from the original (PDF) on 12 June 2017. "Senarai Calon yang Disahkan Layak Bertanding Pilihan Raya Dewan Undangan Negeri ke-11". Election Commission of Malaysia. 25 April 2016. Archived from the original on 2016-04-25.

Sarawak state election, 2011: Bukit Assek
Party	Candidate	Votes	%	∆%
DAP	Wong Ho Leng	13,527	73.49	▲8.65
BN	Chieng Buong Toon	4,700	25.53	▼9.63
Independent	Hii Tiong Huat	180	0.98	▲0.98
Total valid votes		18,407	100.00	
Total rejected ballots		97		
Unreturned ballots		14		
Turnout		18,518	68.77	▲6.86
Registered electors		26,926		
Majority		8,827	47.95	▲18.28
DAP hold		Swing		
Source(s) "Federal Government Gazette - Results of Contested Election and Statements of the Poll after the Official Addition of Votes Sarawak [P.U. (B) 245/2011]" (PDF). Attorney General's Chambers of Malaysia. 29 April 2011.

Sarawak state election, 2006: Bukit Assek
Party	Candidate	Votes	%	∆%
DAP	Wong Ho Leng	10,380	64.84	▲18.58
BN	Daniel Ngieng Kiong Ann	5,629	35.16	▼18.58
Total valid votes		16,009	100.00	
Total rejected ballots		78		
Unreturned ballots		12		
Turnout		16,099	61.91	▼4.17
Registered electors		26,022		
Majority		4,751	29.68	▲22.20
DAP gain from BN		Swing		?

Sarawak state election, 2001: Bukit Assek
Party	Candidate	Votes	%	∆%
BN	Daniel Ngieng Kiong Ann	6,289	53.74	▲4.72
DAP	Wong Ho Leng	5,414	46.26	▼4.72
Total valid votes		11,703	100.00	
Total rejected ballots		58		
Unreturned ballots		6		
Turnout		11,767	66.08	▲2.78
Registered electors		17,807		
Majority		875	7.48	▲5.51
BN gain from DAP		Swing		?

Sarawak state election, 1996: Bukit Assek
Party	Candidate	Votes	%	∆%
DAP	Wong Ho Leng	5,856	50.98	▲22.46
BN	Wong Soon Kai	5,630	49.02	▼22.46
Total valid votes		11,486	100.00	
Total rejected ballots		82		
Unreturned ballots		23		
Turnout		11,591	63.30	▼9.32
Registered electors		18,310		
Majority		226	1.97	▼40.99
DAP gain from BN		Swing		?

Sarawak state election, 1991: Bukit Assek
Party	Candidate	Votes	%
BN	Wong Soon Kai	10,569	71.48
DAP	Wong Sing Nang	4,216	28.52
Total valid votes		14,785	100.00
Total rejected ballots		59	
Unreturned ballots		14	
Turnout		14,858	72.62
Registered electors		20,459	
Majority		6,353	42.97
This was a new constituency created.
