= Irene Chang =

Malaysian politician

- 郑爱鸰

Member of the Sarawak State Legislative Assembly for Bukit Assek
- In office 7 June 2016 – 3 November 2021
- Preceded by: Wong Ho Leng
- Constituency: Bukit Assek
- Majority: 4497 (2016)

Personal details
- Born: 10 March 1965 (age 61) Bau, Kuching
- Citizenship: Malaysian
- Party: Democratic Action Party (DAP)
- Spouse: Wong Ho Leng
- Education: University of London
- Occupation: Politician
- Profession: Lawyer

Irene Mary Chang Oi Ling (simplified Chinese: 郑爱鸰; traditional Chinese: 鄭愛鴒; pinyin: Zhèng Àilíng, born 10 March 1965) is a Malaysian politician. She served as the Member of the Sarawak State Legislative Assembly for Bukit Assek from June 2016 to November 2021. She is a member of the Democratic Action Party (DAP) in the Pakatan Harapan (PH) coalition.

== Background ==
Born in Bau, Kuching, Chang is the daughter of former SNAP Treasurer-General, businessman Datuk Seri Paduka Denis Chang Foh Onn, and the wife of Wong Ho Leng, the latter was the former Member of Parliament for Sibu (2010–2013) and former Member of the State Legislative Assembly for Bukit Assek (1996-2001, 2006–2014).

== Education ==
Chang started her primary school education in SK St. Rita, Sibu, and attended SMK St. Elizabeth, Sibu for her secondary education until she was 15 when she switched to St. Albany College, London for her O Levels and A Levels. In 1989, Chang was awarded with a Bachelor of Laws degree from University of London, graduating with Honors.

== Political career ==
Before entering politics in the 2016 Sarawak State Election, Chang was already active in grassroots activities as she helped her late husband throughout his political journey. She was recognised as the woman behind the success of Wong Ho Leng.

When Wong Ho Leng died from a brain tumor in 2014, Chang was fielded by the Democratic Action Party (DAP) as a candidate in the 11th Sarawak State Election for the state constituency Bukit Assek in hopes to continue her late husband's legacy and fighting for the betterment of the country.

=== 2016 Sarawak State Election ===
Chang won with a majority of 4,497 votes against Barisan Nasional (BN) candidate Chieng Buong Toon and State Reform Party (STAR) candidate Moh Hiong King. She garnered 11,392 votes as compared to Chieng Buong Toon's 6,895 votes and Moh Hiong King's 374 votes. She successfully retained Bukit Assek for DAP.

=== Political Tenure: 2016-2021 ===
==== Sarawak Consultative Committee on MA63 ====
Despite being from the opposition party, Chang was among the committee members in the Sarawak Consultative Committee which was established to serve as a vehicle to assist Chief Minister Datuk Patinggi Abang Johari and to advise the August House on fighting for Sarawak's rights as enshrined in the MA63. The establishment of this Committee was as a response to the formation of the MA63 Steering Committee chaired by Prime Minister Mahathir Mohamad on 5 September 2018. The Consultative Committee was formed under Standing Order 89 of the Standing Orders of the DUN and Article 24(1) of the Sarawak State Constitution through a motion dated on 6 November 2018.

==== Oil Mining (Amendment) Bill, 2018 ====
In 2018, the State Legislative Assembly debated the Oil Mining (Amendment) Bill which enables the state stronger regulatory controls over the exploration and prospecting for petroleum on the land in Sarawak, both onshore and offshore in the Continental Shelf. Chang supported the Bill. However, she also raised her concerns and advised the State Government that they should declare at the court that the Petroleum Development Act (PDA), the Territorial Sea Act (TSA) and the Continental Shelf Act (CSA) are not relevant in Sarawak.

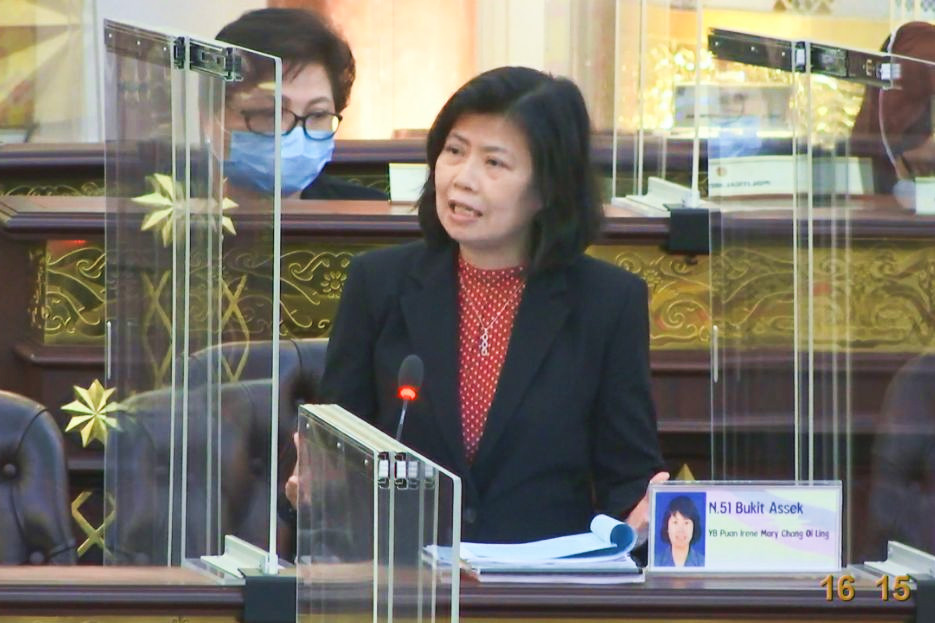
Chang debate in DUN.

==== Natural Resources and Environment (Amendment) Ordinance 2019 ====
In 2019, the State Legislative Assembly had a heated debate on the amendment of the Natural Resources and Environment Ordinance (NREO) which enables Sarawak to tackle environmental issues that are becoming more complex and diverse amid its developed state transformation agenda by 2030. Chang participated in the debate, raising the issue that the open landfill at Jalan Seng Ling, Sibu which was actually meant to be used to dump bulky waste only was apparently used to discard all sort of waste including liquid waste, solid rubbish, organic waste, recyclable waste and hazardous waste over the years, which has caused squatters to start a livelihood at the area. She brought up her concern in the august House if there was any public engagement of the people and if any feedback were collected from the public on the suitability of location, environmental social and economic impact which the open landfill would cause the communities staying around the area before the local government decided to use the place for open landfill 18 years ago. The question was raised referring to the underground burning that happened at Seng Ling dumpsite in October 2019.

=== 2021 Sarawak State Election ===
In the 2021 Sarawak State Election (12th Sarawak State Election), Chang contested to defend her Bukit Assek seat against five other candidates, Jess Lau from Parti Aspirasi Rakyat Sarawak (Aspirasi), Chieng Jin Ek from Gabungan Parti Sarawak (GPS), Ting Kee Nguan from Parti Sarawak Bersatu (PSB), Priscilla Lau from Parti Bumi Kenyalang (PBK) and independent candidate Hii Tiong Huat. She garnered 3,810 votes and was defeated by Chieng Jin Ek who won with a majority of 874 votes due to the overwhelming split votes by the local opposition parties.

== Election results ==
Sarawak State Legislative Assembly
Year	Constituency	Candidate	Votes	Pct	Opponent(s)	Votes	Pct	Ballots Cast	Majority	Turnout
2016	N51 Bukit Assek	Irene Chang (DAP)	11,392	61.05%	Chieng Buong Toon (SUPP)	6,895	36.95%	18,881	4,497	66.62%
2016	N51 Bukit Assek	Irene Chang (DAP)	11,392	61.05%	Moh Hiong King (STAR)	374	2.00%	18,881	4,497	66.62%
2021	N51 Bukit Assek	Irene Chang (DAP)	3,810	28.42%	Joseph Chieng Jin Ek (SUPP)	4,684	34.94%	13,404	874	48.50%
2021	N51 Bukit Assek	Irene Chang (DAP)	3,810	28.42%	Priscilla Lau (PBK)	2,598	19.38%	13,404	874	48.50%
2021	N51 Bukit Assek	Irene Chang (DAP)	3,810	28.42%	Ting Kee Nguan (PSB)	1,790	13.35%	13,404	874	48.50%
2021	N51 Bukit Assek	Irene Chang (DAP)	3,810	28.42%	Hii Tiong Huat (IND)	313	2.34%	13,404	874	48.50%
2021	N51 Bukit Assek	Irene Chang (DAP)	3,810	28.42%	Jess Lau (ASPIRASI)	209	1.56%	13,404	874	48.50%

== Current appointments ==
- State Political Education Bureau Director, Democratic Action Party Sarawak (2024-2027)
- Chairperson, Democratic Action Party Lanang Road Branch (2024-2025)
- Chief, Democratic Action Party Women's Wing Lanang Division (2024-2027)

== Publication ==
In 2021, Chang released Last Writings, a diary authored by her late husband, Wong Ho Leng. Last Writings, compiled by Chang with her five children was released on 21 June 2021, which was the 7th anniversary of her husband’s death. The book records Wong’s thoughts, fears, struggles and his determination to fight cancer as he walked on through his cancer journey. Last Writings is available in English and Mandarin version.

- Last Writings (2021) ISBN 978-967-19903-0-8
