= Ngemah =

State constituency in Sarawak, Malaysia

Ngemah (N50)
Sarawak constituency

State constituency
- Legislature: Sarawak State Legislative Assembly
MLA
Vacant
- Constituency created: 1968
- First contested: 1969
- Last contested: 2026

Ngemah is a state constituency in Sarawak, Malaysia, that has been represented in the Sarawak State Legislative Assembly since 1969.

The state constituency was created in the 1968 redistribution and is mandated to return a single member to the Sarawak State Legislative Assembly under the first past the post voting system.

== Demographics ==
Ethnic breakdown of Ngemah's electorate as of 2022
1. Sarawak bumiputera (92.5%)
2. Chinese (6.30%)
3. Malay-Muslim bumiputera (0.80%)
4. Other ethnicities (0.40%)

== History ==
As of 2020, Ngemah has a population of 10,159 people.

=== Polling districts ===
According to the gazette issued on 31 October 2022, the Ngemah constituency has a total of 6 polling districts.

State constituency	Polling Districts	Code	Location
Ngemah（N49）	Kajah	210/49/01	SK Ng. Jagau
Ngemah（N49）	Bat	210/49/02	SK Ng. Nirok; Pejabat Pertanian Ng. Ngemah; SK Ng. Ngungun
Ngemah（N49）	Sengayan	210/49/03	SK Ng. Ngemah; SK Rantau Dilang; SK Ng. Sengayan; SK Ng. Dap
Ngemah（N49）	Mapai	210/49/04	Dewan Datuk Aaron; SK Ng. Tada
Ngemah（N49）	Bawan	210/49/05	SK Ulu Bawan; SK Sg. Tuah; RH Mary Gurs @ Mary Grace Chendang
Ngemah（N49）	Pidai	210/49/06	SK Ng. Pidai; SK Ng. Jih; SJK (C) Sing Shing

=== Representation history ===
Members of the Legislative Assembly for Ngemah
Assembly	No	Years	Member	Party
Constituency created
8th	N36	1970	Lias Kana	Independent
8th	N36	1970-1973	Lias Kana	PESAKA
8th	N36	1973-1974	Lias Kana	BN (PBB)
9th	N36	1974-1979	Lias Kana	BN (PBB)
10th	N36	1979-1983	Joseph Kudi	BN (PBB)
11th	N36	1983-1987	Joseph Kudi	PBDS
12th	N35	1987-1991	Joseph Kudi	PBDS
13th	N35	1991-1996	Gabriel Adit Demong	PBDS
14th	N37	1996-2001	Gabriel Adit Demong	BN (PBDS)
15th	N37	2001-2002	Gabriel Adit Demong	BN (PBDS)
15th	N37	2002-2004	Gabriel Adit Demong	BN (PRS)
16th	N43	2006-2008	Adeh Denong	Independent
16th	N43	2008-2009	Adeh Denong	PR (PKR)
16th	N43	2009-2011	Adeh Denong	PCM
17th	N43	2011-2016	Alexander Vincent	BN (PRS)
18th	N49	2016-2018	Alexander Vincent	BN (PRS)
18th	N49	2018–2021	Alexander Vincent	GPS (PRS)
19th	N49	2021–2026	Anyi Jana	GPS (PRS)

== Election results ==
Sarawak state election, 2026: Ngemah
Party	Candidate	Votes	%	∆%
GPS				▲
PBDS Baru	Tedwin Beti			▲
Total valid votes				
Total rejected ballots				
Unreturned ballots				
Turnout				
Registered electors				
Majority				

Sarawak state election, 2021: Ngemah
Party	Candidate	Votes	%	∆%
GPS	Anyi Jana	3,193	46.23	▲46.23
PSB	Joseph Jawa Kendawang	2,932	42.45	▼1.22
PBDS Baru	Leo Bunsu	354	5.13	▲5.13
PKR	Satu Anchom	259	3.75	▼2.57
PBK	Charlie Genam	169	2.45	▲2.45
Total valid votes		6,907	100.00	
Total rejected ballots		97		
Unreturned ballots		41		
Turnout		7,045	71.50	▼0.37
Registered electors		9,853		
Majority		261	3.78	▲1.32
GPS gain from BN		Swing		?
Source(s) https://lom.agc.gov.my/ilims/upload/portal/akta/outputp/1718688/PUB687.pdf

Sarawak state election, 2016: Ngemah
Party	Candidate	Votes	%	∆%
BN	Alexander Vincent	2,888	46.13	▲1.13
Independent	Joseph Jawa Kendawang	2,734	43.67	▲43.67
PKR	Thomas Laja Besi	396	6.32	▼6.13
DAP	Richard Lias	243	3.88	▲3.88
Total valid votes		6,261	100.00	
Total rejected ballots		114		
Unreturned ballots		21		
Turnout		6,396	71.87	▲5.05
Registered electors		8,899		
Majority		154	2.46	▼16.27
BN hold		Swing		
Source(s) "Federal Government Gazette - Notice of Contested Election, State Legislative Assembly of the State of Sarawak [P.U. (B) 190/2016]" (PDF). Attorney General's Chambers of Malaysia. 25 April 2016. Archived from the original (PDF) on 12 June 2017. "Senarai Calon yang Disahkan Layak Bertanding Pilihan Raya Dewan Undangan Negeri ke-11". Election Commission of Malaysia. 25 April 2016. Archived from the original on 25 April 2016.

Sarawak state election, 2011: Ngemah
Party	Candidate	Votes	%	∆%
BN	Alexander Vincent	2,378	45.00	▲3.98
Love Malaysia Party	Adeh Denong	1,388	26.27	▼25.83
PKR	Aris Alap	658	12.45	▲12.45
SNAP	Michael Lias	581	11.00	▲4.12
Independent	Yakup Khalid	279	5.28	▲5.28
Total valid votes		5,284	100.00	
Total rejected ballots		95		
Unreturned ballots		5		
Turnout		5,384	66.82	▲3.01
Registered electors		8,058		
Majority		990	18.74	▲7.67
BN gain from Independent		Swing		?
Source(s) "Federal Government Gazette - Results of Contested Election and Statements of the Poll after the Official Addition of Votes Sarawak [P.U. (B) 245/2011]" (PDF). Attorney General's Chambers of Malaysia. 29 April 2011.

Sarawak state election, 2006: Ngemah
Party	Candidate	Votes	%	∆%
Independent	Adeh Denong	2,582	52.10	▲52.10
BN	Alexander Vincent	2,033	41.02	▼18.41
SNAP	Richard Lias	341	6.88	▲6.88
Total valid votes		4,956	100.00	
Total rejected ballots		48		
Unreturned ballots		5		
Turnout		5,009	63.81	▼3.38
Registered electors		7,849		
Majority		549	11.08	▼7.78
Independent gain from BN		Swing		?

Sarawak state election, 2001: Ngemah
Party	Candidate	Votes	%	∆%
BN	Gabriel Adit Demong	3,037	59.43	▼8.93
Independent	Michael Lias	2,073	40.57	▲40.57
Total valid votes		5,110	100.00	
Total rejected ballots		70		
Unreturned ballots		0		
Turnout		5,180	67.19	▲4.30
Registered electors		7,709		
Majority		964	18.86	▼17.86
BN hold		Swing		

Sarawak state election, 1996: Ngemah
Party	Candidate	Votes	%	∆%
BN	Gabriel Adit Demong	3,178	68.36	▲13.85
Independent	Peter Telajan Sabai	1,471	31.64	▲31.64
Total valid votes		4,649	100.00	
Total rejected ballots		111		
Unreturned ballots		8		
Turnout		4,768	62.89	▼10.39
Registered electors		7,581		
Majority		1,707	36.72	▲27.70
BN gain from PBDS		Swing		?

Sarawak state election, 1991: Ngemah
Party	Candidate	Votes	%	∆%
PBDS	Gabriel Adit Demong	2,913	54.51	▲0.51
BN	Robert Menua Saleh	2,431	45.49	▼0.51
Total valid votes		5,344	100.00	
Total rejected ballots		77		
Unreturned ballots		15		
Turnout		5,436	73.28	
Registered electors		7,418		
Majority		482	9.02	▲1.04
PBDS hold		Swing		

Sarawak state election, 1987: Ngemah
Party	Candidate	Votes	%	∆%
PBDS	Joseph Kudi	2,427	54.00	▲8.45
BN	Tan Seliong	2,068	46.00	▲11.69
Total valid votes		4,495	100.00	
Total rejected ballots		76		
Unreturned ballots		0		
Turnout		4,571	72.73	
Registered electors		6,285		
Majority		359	7.99	▼3.24
PBDS hold		Swing		

Sarawak state election, 1983: Ngemah
Party	Candidate	Votes	%	∆%
PBDS	Joseph Kudi	1,948	45.56	▲45.56
SNAP	Thomas Babai Lias	1,468	34.33	▼21.23
Independent	Joseph Unting Umang	860	20.11	▲20.11
Total valid votes		4,276	100.00	
Total rejected ballots		100		
Unreturned ballots		0		
Turnout		4,376	71.22	
Registered electors		6,144		
Majority		480	11.22	▼24.54
PBDS gain from BN		Swing		?

Sarawak state election, 1979: Ngemah
Party	Candidate	Votes	%	∆%
BN	Joseph Kudi	2,194	55.57	▲22.71
Independent	Tajan Seli	782	19.81	▲19.81
Independent	Lias Kana	550	13.93	▼18.95
Independent	Inok Kudor	422	10.69	▲10.69
Total valid votes		3,948	100.00	
Total rejected ballots		110		
Unreturned ballots		0		
Turnout		4,058	70.80	▲5.23
Registered electors		5,732		
Majority		1,412	35.76	▲22.13
BN hold		Swing		

Sarawak state election, 1974: Ngemah
Party	Candidate	Votes	%	∆%
SNAP	Francis Umpau	1,382	46.50	▲25.25
BN	Lias Kana	977	32.87	▲7.24
Independent	John Gaweng Migi	613	20.63	▲20.63
Total valid votes		2,972	100.00	
Total rejected ballots		401		
Unreturned ballots		0		
Turnout		3,373	65.84	▼5.50
Registered electors		5,123		
Majority		405	13.63	▲9.25
SNAP hold		Swing		

Sarawak state election, 1969: Ngemah
Party	Candidate	Votes	%
Independent	Lias Kana	796	25.63
PESAKA	Francis Umpau	660	21.25
SNAP	Jaran Serit	603	19.41
Independent	Guntok Bana	539	17.35
SUPP	Ansi Anyau	428	13.78
Independent	Ungai Sempon	47	1.51
Independent	Unjok Andeng	33	1.06
Total valid votes		3,106	100.00
Total rejected ballots		267	
Unreturned ballots		0	
Turnout		3,373	71.34
Registered electors		4,728	
Majority		136	4.38
This was a new constituency created.
