= Joseph Entulu Belaun =

Malaysian politician

Yang Berbahagia Datuk Joseph Entulu Belaun PGBK

Ministerial roles
- 2004–2008: Deputy Minister in the Prime Minister's Department
- 2008–2013: Deputy Minister of Rural and Regional Development
- 2013–2018: Minister in the Prime Minister's Department

Ministerial roles (Sarawak)
- 1997–2002: Assistant Minister in the Chief Minister's Department
- 2002–2004: Minister of Youth and Sports

Faction represented in Dewan Rakyat
- 2004–2018: Barisan Nasional

Faction represented in Sarawak State Legislative Assembly
- 1991–2006: Barisan Nasional

Personal details
- Born: 8 June 1954 (age 72) Crown Colony of Sarawak (now Sarawak, Malaysia)
- Citizenship: Malaysian
- Party: Sarawak Native People's Party (PBDS); Sarawak People's Party (PRS) (2004-May 2018); People's Justice Party (PKR) (May 2018-Mar 2019); Parti Sarawak Bersatu (PSB) (Apr 2019-Apr 2024); Progressive Democratic Party (PDP) (2024-May 2025); Parti Bansa Dayak Sarawak Baru (PBDS) (since May 2025)
- Other political affiliations: Barisan Nasional (BN); Pakatan Harapan (PH); Gabungan Parti Sarawak (GPS)
- Spouse: Jacklyne Anthony
- Children: Magnus Ngelambong Belaun
- Occupation: Politician

Joseph Entulu Belaun (born 8 June 1954) is a Malaysian politician. He was a Minister in the Prime Minister's Department and a Member of Parliament (MP) for the Selangau constituency in Sarawak, representing the Sarawak People's Party (PRS) from 2004 until the dissolution of the Parliament on 7 April 2018.

== Political career ==
Entulu was elected to Parliament in the 2004 general elections. Immediately after his election in 2004, Entulu was appointed to the federal level as Deputy Minister in the Prime Minister's Department. Before his election into the Dewan Rakyat, he was Assistant Minister to the Chief Minister of Sarawak from 1997 to 2002 and later was promoted as full minister holding the portfolio of Youth and Sports from 2002 until 2004. He was first elected to Parliament as a member of the Sarawak Native People's Party (PBDS), but joined the PRS after the Parti Bansa Dayak Sarawak (PBDS) was deregistered in 2004.

Entulu was re-elected unopposed to Parliament in the 2008 general elections. Following the 2008 general elections he became Deputy Minister of Rural and Regional Development and in October 2008, he was also conferred the title of Datuk.

He has spoken out against the use of the term Dayak as a generic descriptor of Sarawak's indigenous non-Muslim residents, preferring instead specific terms for each community in 2009.

After he was re-elected again in the 2013 general elections, Entulu was promoted to a full minister as a Minister in the Prime Minister's Department.

On 13 May 2018, People's Justice Party (PKR) Women chief Zuraida Kamaruddin announced that Entulu has joined its ranks as a PKR party member in a press conference in Cheras.

Entulu has joined Parti Sarawak Bersatu (PSB) since March 2019, but now he has since joined the Progressive Democratic Party (PDP) en bloc ever since the latter party was dissolved and merged in March 2024. Prior to that, he was the Deputy President of the PRS until his sacking in April 2018, which was announced by the PRS President Dr. James Jemut Masing.

== Election results ==
Parliament of Malaysia
Year	Constituency	Candidate	Votes	Pct	Opponent(s)	Votes	Pct	Ballots cast	Majority	Turnout
2004	P213 Selangau	Joseph Entulu Belaun (PBDS)	7,876	64.90%	Liman Sujang (SNAP)	4,260	35.10%	12,376	3,616	60.49%
2008	P214 Selangau	Joseph Entulu Belaun (PRS)	Unopposed							
2013	P214 Selangau	Joseph Entulu Belaun (PRS)	12,040	58.97%	Sng Chee Hua (SWP)	4,485	21.97%	20,753	7,555	81.51%
2013	P214 Selangau	Joseph Entulu Belaun (PRS)	12,040	58.97%	Joshua Jabeng (PKR)	3,891	19.06%	20,753	7,555	81.51%

Sarawak State Legislative Assembly
Year	Constituency	Candidate	Votes	Pct.	Opponent(s)	Votes	Pct.	Ballots cast	Majority	Turnout
1991	N43 Tamin	Joseph Entulu Belaun (PBDS)	3,455	52.97%	Jawan Empaling (SUPP)	2,943	45.12%	6,589	512	72.79%
1991	N43 Tamin	Joseph Entulu Belaun (PBDS)	3,455	52.97%	Emat Lidy Elaun (IND)	124	1.90%	6,589	512	72.79%
1996	N46 Tamin	Joseph Entulu Belaun (PRS)	4,612	73.38%	Munan John Andrew (IND)	1,589	25.28%	6,410	3,023	63.64$
1996	N46 Tamin	Joseph Entulu Belaun (PRS)	4,612	73.38%	Munan Jeti (IND)	84	1.34%	6,410	3,023	63.64$
2001	N46 Tamin	Joseph Entulu Belaun (PRS)	6,310	87.93%	Ricky Bernard Betti (IND)	866	12.07%	7,307	5,444	67.89%
2021	N59 Tamin	Joseph Entulu Belaun (PSB)	4,190	35.01%	Christopher Gira Sambang (PRS)	7,778	64.99%	12,144	3,588	72.80%

== Honours ==
=== Honours of Malaysia ===
- Sarawak
  - Commander of the Order of the Star of Hornbill Sarawak (PGBK) – Datuk (2008)
