= Joseph Chieng Jin Ek =

Malaysian politician

Yang Berhormat Joseph Chieng Jin Ek MLA
- 钱进一

Member of the Sarawak State Legislative Assembly for Bukit Assek
- Incumbent
- Assumed office 18 December 2021
- Preceded by: Irene Chang Oi Ling (PH–DAP)
- Majority: 874 (2021)

Personal details
- Born: Chieng Jin Ek; 17 February 1975 (age 51) Sibu, Sarawak, Malaysia
- Citizenship: Malaysian
- Party: Sarawak United Peoples' Party (SUPP)
- Other political affiliations: Barisan Nasional (BN) (until 2018); Gabungan Parti Sarawak (since 2018)
- Education: University of New South Wales
- Occupation: Politician

Joseph Chieng Jin Ek (Chinese: 钱进一; pinyin: Qián Jìnyī; born 17 February 1975) is a Malaysian politician who has served as Member of the Sarawak State Legislative Assembly (MLA) for Bukit Assek since December 2021. He is also a member of the Sarawak United Peoples' Party (SUPP), a component party of the ruling Gabungan Parti Sarawak (GPS) coalition in Sarawak.

== Election results ==
Sarawak State Legislative Assembly
Year	Constituency	candidate	Votes	Pct	Opponent(s)	Votes	Pct	Ballots cast	Majority	Turnout
2021	N51 Bukit Assek	Joseph Chieng Jin Ek (SUPP)	4,684	34.94%	Irene Chang Oi Ling (DAP)	3,810	28.42%	13,404	874	TBA
2021	N51 Bukit Assek	Joseph Chieng Jin Ek (SUPP)	4,684	34.94%	Priscilla Lau (PBK)	2,598	19.38%	13,404	874	TBA
2021	N51 Bukit Assek	Joseph Chieng Jin Ek (SUPP)	4,684	34.94%	Ting Kee Nguan (PSB)	1,790	13.35%	13,404	874	TBA
2021	N51 Bukit Assek	Joseph Chieng Jin Ek (SUPP)	4,684	34.94%	Hii Tiong Huat (IND)	313	2.34%	13,404	874	TBA
2021	N51 Bukit Assek	Joseph Chieng Jin Ek (SUPP)	4,684	34.94%	Jess Lau (ASPIRASI)	209	1.56%	13,404	874	TBA
