= Murum (state constituency) =

State constituency in Sarawak, Malaysia

Murum (N66)
Sarawak constituency

State constituency
- Legislature: Sarawak State Legislative Assembly
MLA
Vacant
- Constituency created: 2015
- First contested: 2016
- Last contested: 2026

Murum is a state constituency in Sarawak, Malaysia, that has been represented in the Sarawak State Legislative Assembly since 2016.

The state constituency was created in the 2015 redistribution and is mandated to return a single member to the Sarawak State Legislative Assembly under the first past the post voting system.

== Demographics ==
Ethnic breakdown of Murum's electorate as of 2022
1. Sarawak bumiputera (95.9%)
2. Chinese (1.80%)
3. Malay-Muslim bumiputera (1.00%)
4. Other ethnicities (1.30%)

== History ==
As of 2020, Murum has a population of 20,934 people.

=== Polling districts ===
According to the gazette issued on 31 October 2022, the Murum constituency has a total of 3 polling districts.

State constituency	Polling District	Code	Location
Murum (N66)	Long Murum	216/66/01	SK Metalun; RH Penan Long Peran; Dewan Serbaguna Long Wat; RH Penan Long Lidem; SK Lusong Laku; RH Penan Long Tanyit
Murum (N66)	Asap	216/66/02	SK Lg. Urun; RH Seping Long Bala; Uma Sping Lg. Koyan; Uma Kulit Daerah Kecil Asap; Uma Belor Daerah Kecil Asap; Uma Daro Daerah Kecil Asap; Uma Kelap Daerah Kecil Asap; Uma Lahanan Daerah Kecil Asap; Uma Nyaving Daerah Kecil Asap; Uma Bawang Daerah Kecil Asap; Uma Bakah Daerah Kecil Asap; Uma Balui Ukap Daerah Kecil Asap; Uma Lesong Daerah Kecil Asap; Uma Ukit Daerah Kecil Asap; Uma Juman Daerah Kecil Asap; Uma Penan Talun Daerah Kecil Asap; Uma Badang Daerah Kecil Asap
Murum (N66)	Tubau	216/66/03	SK Bukit Balai Tubau; RH Joshua Btg Tubau; RH Alip, Long Unan Tubau; RH Lasah Tuba Sg. Dusan Jelalong; RH Patrick Kebing Po; RH Augustine Lateng Saging Tubau; Tadika KEMAS RH Ballrully; RH lichong Sg. Sebutin; RH Jeranding Ulu Jelalong; RH Julaihi Ng. Sau; SK Kuala Kebulu; RH Malek Sg. Kebulu Jelalong

=== Representation history ===
Members of the Legislative Assembly for Murum
Assembly	No	Years	Member	Party
Constituency created from Belaga and Kemena
18th	N66	2016-2018	Kennedy Chukpai Ugon	BN (PRS)
18th	N66	2018-2021	Kennedy Chukpai Ugon	GPS (PRS)
19th	N66	2021–2026	Kennedy Chukpai Ugon	GPS (PRS)

== Election results ==
Sarawak state election, 2026
Party	Candidate	Votes	%	∆%
GPS				▲
PH				▲
Total valid votes				
Total rejected ballots				
Unreturned ballots				
Turnout				
Registered electors				
Majority				

Sarawak state election, 2021
Party	Candidate	Votes	%	∆%
GPS	Kennedy Chukpai Ugon	4,584	66.23	▲66.23
PSB	Stanley Ajang Batok	1,665	24.06	▲24.06
PKR	Ani Amat	513	7.41	▲7.41
PBDS Baru	Kenneth Adan Silek	159	2.30	▲2.30
Total valid votes		6,921	100.00	
Total rejected ballots		67		
Unreturned ballots		18		
Turnout		7,006	71.94	▼3.51
Registered electors		9,738		
Majority		2,919	42.18	▲5.79
GPS gain from BN		Swing		?
Source(s) https://lom.agc.gov.my/ilims/upload/portal/akta/outputp/1718688/PUB687.pdf

Sarawak state election, 2016
Party	Candidate	Votes	%
BN	Kennedy Chukpai Ugon	3,265	54.00
PKR	Abun Sui Anyit	1,065	17.61
Independent	Stanley Ajang Batok	1,029	17.02
DAP	Mathew Silek	687	11.36
Total valid votes		6,046	100.00
Total rejected ballots		153	
Unreturned ballots		20	
Turnout		6,219	75.45
Registered electors		8,242	
Majority		2,200	36.39
This was a new constituency created.
Source(s) "Federal Government Gazette - Notice of Contested Election, State Legislative Assembly of the State of Sarawak [P.U. (B) 190/2016]" (PDF). Attorney General's Chambers of Malaysia. 25 April 2016. Archived from the original (PDF) on 12 June 2017. "Senarai Calon yang Disahkan Layak Bertanding Pilihan Raya Dewan Undangan Negeri ke-11". Election Commission of Malaysia. 25 April 2016. Archived from the original on 25 April 2016.
