= Tamin (state constituency) =

State constituency in Sarawak, Malaysia

Tamin (N59)
Sarawak constituency

State constituency
- Legislature: Sarawak State Legislative Assembly
MLA
Vacant
- Constituency created: 1987
- First contested: 1991
- Last contested: 2026

Tamin is a state constituency in Sarawak, Malaysia, that has been represented in the Sarawak State Legislative Assembly since 1991.

The state constituency was created in the 1987 redistribution and is mandated to return a single member to the Sarawak State Legislative Assembly under the first past the post voting system.

== Demographics ==
Ethnic breakdown of Tamin's electorate as of 2022
1. Sarawak bumiputera (95.4%)
2. Malay-Muslim bumiputera (1.10%)
3. Chinese (2.80%)
4. Other ethnicities (0.70%)

== History ==
As of 2020, Tamin has a population of 16,815 people.

=== Polling districts ===
According to the gazette issued on 31 October 2022, the Tamin constituency has a total of 5 polling districts.

State constituency	Polling Districts	Code	Location
Tamin（N59）	Siong	214/59/01	SK Ulu Siong; SMK Luar Bandar No. 1; SK Siong Tengah; SK Sg. Siong
Tamin（N59）	Tamin	214/59/02	RH Jangit Anak Lantieng; SK Bt. 36; SK St Mark; SK Ng. Tajam
Tamin（N59）	Sekuau	214/59/03	SK Penghulu Imban; RH Sarikei; RH Lanting Anak Buda; Dewan Masyarakat Sekuau; SK Sg. Pakoh Ng. Selabi; RH Tujoh Bejait Ulu Oya
Tamin（N59）	Selangau	214/59/04	SK Sg. Arau Ulu Mukah; RH Tegong Ulu Selangau; SK Ng. Kua; RH Pengarah Ng. Selabi; SJK (C) Tong Ah; RH Jarau Sg. Kua Batu 43 Jln. Sibu / Bintulu
Tamin（N59）	Lemai	214/59/05	SK Sg. Buloh; SK Sg. Sepiring Batu 62 Jln. Sibu /Tatau; SK Kuala Lemai; SMK Ulu Balingian; SK Sg. Kemena; SK Kuala Pelugau

=== Representation history ===
Members of the Legislative Assembly for Tamin
Assembly	No	Years	Member	Party
Constituency created from Balingian and Dudong
13th	N43	1991-1996	Joseph Entulu Belaun	PBDS
14th	N46	1996-2001	Joseph Entulu Belaun	BN (PBDS)
15th	N46	2001-2004	Joseph Entulu Belaun	BN (PBDS)
15th	N46	2004-2006	Joseph Entulu Belaun	BN (PRS)
16th	N52	2006-2011	Joseph Mauh Ikeh	BN (PRS)
17th	N52	2011-2016	Joseph Mauh Ikeh	BN (PRS)
18th	N59	2016-2018	Christopher Gira Sambang	BN (PRS)
18th	N59	2018-2021	Christopher Gira Sambang	GPS (PRS)
19th	N59	2021–2026	Christopher Gira Sambang	GPS (PRS)

== Election results ==
Sarawak state election, 2026
Party	Candidate	Votes	%	∆%
GPS				▲
PH				▲
Total valid votes				
Total rejected ballots				
Unreturned ballots				
Turnout				
Registered electors				
Majority				

Sarawak state election, 2021
Party	Candidate	Votes	%	∆%
GPS	Christopher Gira Sambang	7,778	64.99	▲64.99
PSB	Joseph Entulu Belaun	4,190	35.01	▲35.01
Total valid votes		11,968	100.00	
Total rejected ballots		158		
Unreturned ballots		18		
Turnout		12,144	72.80	▼4.19
Registered electors		16,681		
Majority		3,588	29.98	▲11.56
GPS gain from BN		Swing		?
Source(s) https://lom.agc.gov.my/ilims/upload/portal/akta/outputp/1718688/PUB687.pdf

Sarawak state election, 2016
Party	Candidate	Votes	%	∆%
BN	Christopher Gira Sambang	6,230	54.99	▼2.43
Independent	Ali Puji	4,145	36.59	▲36.59
PKR	Simon Joseph	954	8.42	▼34.16
Total valid votes		11,329	100.00	
Total rejected ballots		169		
Unreturned ballots		10		
Turnout		11,508	76.99	▲4.34
Registered electors		14,948		
Majority		2,085	18.40	▲3.55
BN hold		Swing		
Source(s) "Federal Government Gazette - Notice of Contested Election, State Legislative Assembly of the State of Sarawak [P.U. (B) 190/2016]" (PDF). Attorney General's Chambers of Malaysia. 25 April 2016. Archived from the original (PDF) on 12 June 2017. "Senarai Calon yang Disahkan Layak Bertanding Pilihan Raya Dewan Undangan Negeri ke-11". Election Commission of Malaysia. 25 April 2016. Archived from the original on 25 April 2016.

Sarawak state election, 2011
Party	Candidate	Votes	%	∆%
BN	Joseph Mauh Ikeh	4,998	57.42	▼9.80
PKR	Mengga Mikui	3,706	42.58	▲42.58
Total valid votes		8,704	100.00	
Total rejected ballots		181		
Unreturned ballots		10		
Turnout		8,895	72.65	▲8.22
Registered electors		12,244		
Majority		1,292	14.84	▼19.67
BN hold		Swing		
Source(s) "Federal Government Gazette - Results of Contested Election and Statements of the Poll after the Official Addition of Votes Sarawak [P.U. (B) 245/2011]" (PDF). Attorney General's Chambers of Malaysia. 29 April 2011.

Sarawak state election, 2006
Party	Candidate	Votes	%	∆%
BN	Joseph Mauh Ikeh	4,639	67.22	▼20.71
SNAP	Augustine Liom @ August Liom	2,262	32.78	▲32.78
Total valid votes		6,901	100.00	
Total rejected ballots		120		
Unreturned ballots		2		
Turnout		7,023	64.43	▼3.46
Registered electors		10,900		
Majority		2,377	34.45	▼41.26
BN hold		Swing		

Sarawak state election, 2001
Party	Candidate	Votes	%	∆%
BN	Joseph Entulu Belaun	6,310	87.93	▲14.55
Independent	Ricky Bernard Betti	866	12.07	▲12.07
Total valid votes		7,176	100.00	
Total rejected ballots		129		
Unreturned ballots		2		
Turnout		7,307	67.89	▲4.25
Registered electors		10,763		
Majority		5,444	75.86	▲27.30
BN hold		Swing		

Sarawak state election, 1996
Party	Candidate	Votes	%	∆%
BN	Joseph Entulu Belaun	4,612	73.38	▲20.41
Independent	Munan John Andrew	1,589	25.28	▲25.28
Independent	Munan Jeti	84	1.34	▲1.34
Total valid votes		6,285	100.00	
Total rejected ballots		121		
Unreturned ballots		4		
Turnout		6,410	63.64	▼9.15
Registered electors		10,072		
Majority		3,023	48.10	▲39.76
BN gain from PBDS		Swing		?

Sarawak state election, 1991
Party	Candidate	Votes	%
PBDS	Joseph Entulu Belaun	3,455	52.97
BN	Jawan Empaling	2,943	45.12
Independent	Emat Lidy Elaun	124	1.90
Total valid votes		6,522	100.00
Total rejected ballots		66	
Unreturned ballots		1	
Turnout		6,589	72.79
Registered electors		9,052	
Majority		512	7.85
This was a new constituency created.
