= Faisal Tehrani =

Malaysian writer (born 1974)

Mohd Faizal Musa
- محمد فيصل تهراني موسى
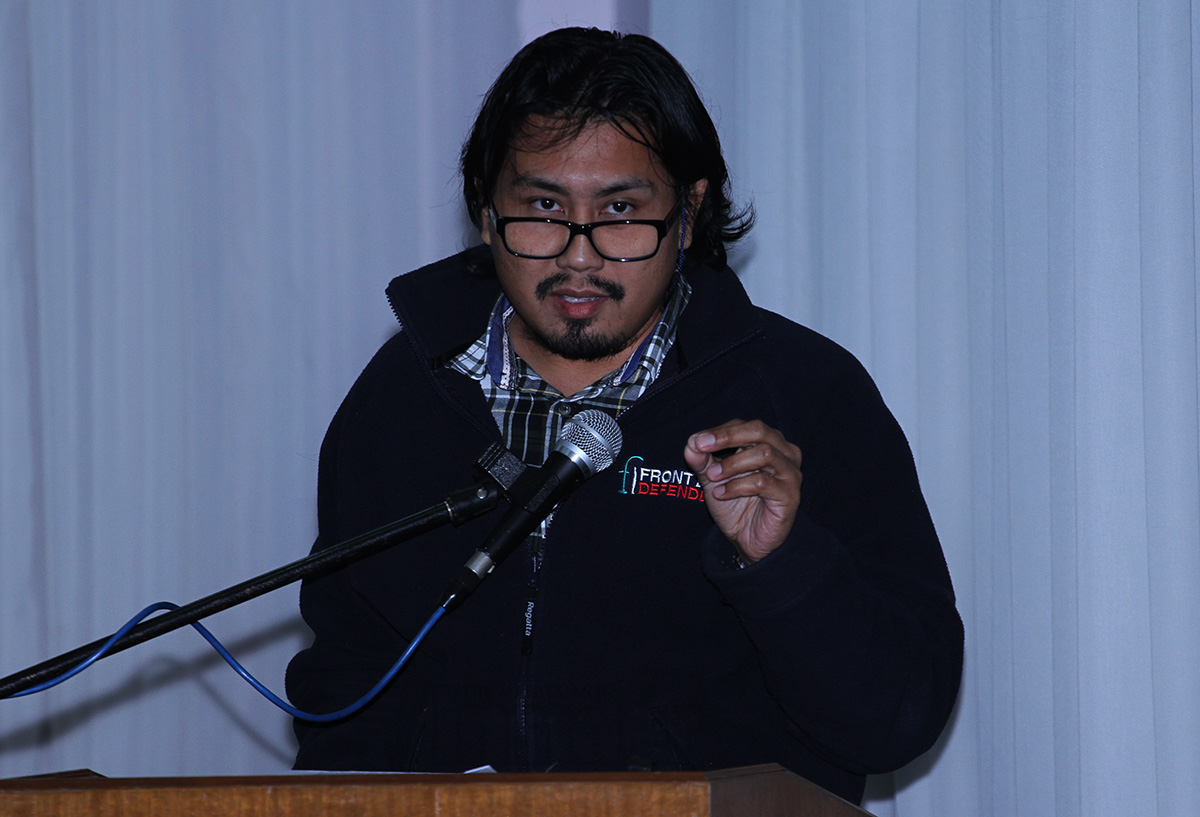
- Born: 7 August 1974 (age 52); Kuala Lumpur, Malaysia
- Writing career
- Pen name: Faisal Tehrani
- Genres: Novel, short-story, poem and stage play

Mohd Faizal Musa (born 7 August 1974), also known under the pen name Faisal Tehrani, is a Malaysian author and playwright. Due to his frequent writing and ideas he was known as a controversial person. He is the author of many books and literary works of various lengths, including stage plays. National Laureate Anwar Ridwan praises of Faisal's writing "conscious of high literature and full of vision."

Faisal has won numerous literary prizes and awards, including the National Art Award (Anugerah Seni Negara) in 2006.

== Education ==
Mohd Faizal Musa was born on 7 August 1974 in Kuala Lumpur before moving to Malacca at the age of 5. He started school at Sacred Heart School of Malacca, then at Primary School Jalan Dato Palembang. Faisal continued his studies at Sekolah Menengah Sultan Muhammad until the age of 15, managing to get excellent Lower Certificate of Education results, after which he continued his studies at the Klang Islamic College (now the Sultan Alam Shah Islamic College). Faisal often honed his skills by supplementary writing of his teenage experiences in a teenage magazine.

=== Expertise ===
Mohd Faizal is a graduate of Bachelor of Syariah-Politics of the University of Malaya (1998), a Master of Arts from Universiti Sains Malaysia (2000), Doctor of Philosophy from the National University of Malaysia (2010). He now works at the National University of Malaysia. As a Research Fellow at the Institute of Malay World and Civilisation, his research is on the Shiite minority in the Malay world. In 2019, he was appointed as an Associate of the Global Sh’ia Diaspora at the Weatherhead Center for International Affairs, Project on Shi’ism and Global Affairs at Harvard University, United States of America.

== Writing career ==
Faisal began his writing career with Cinta Hari-hari Rusuhan published by Creative Enterprise and Perempuan Politikus Melayu by Penerbitan Pemuda, both published in 2000. Both of his works lead to his nomination in the 2000-2001 Hadiah Sastera Perdana Malaysia. There was also Maaf Dari Sorga, which only managed to be published in 2003 by Zebra Publications. Johan Jaafar, a famous literary critic named some good political novels from Malaysia and the Malay Politic Women as "highlighting the pattern of women's political thinking".

In 2002 he released 1515, an alternative historical fiction that takes on the Portuguese conquest of Malacca with victory siding instead to the Malacca Sultanate. It won first place in the 2002 Utusan Malaysia-Exxon Mobil Literature Prize plus the 2005 National Book Award in the General Malay Fiction category. The book is also used as a reading text for Malay studies at the University of Cologne in Germany. The book was eventually translated in 2011 by the National Translation Institute of Malaysia (Institut Terjemahan Buku Malaysia, or ITBM). 1515 is considered to be the most significant work by Faisal Tehrani at the beginning of his writing. For instance, professor emeritus Dr Salleh Yaapar, Universiti Sains Malaysia (USM), talks about the greatness of 1515; "which re-reveals the history and identity of the Malays". In an academic paper, Professor Salleh also named 1515 as a masterpiece. Professor Sohaimi Abdul Aziz, Universiti Sains Malaysia (USM), also named 1515 as a novel full of techniques and literary approaches. Rosma Derak from Universiti Malaysia Sabah, Malaysia, described 1515 as the best of Faisal Tehrani's works and his strength was the use of 'deconstructing historiography' or 'rewriting history'. 1515 is also the only contemporary Malaysian novel mentioned in The Encyclopedia of the Blackwell issue of the novel (2011).

Rahsia Ummi published by Zebra Publications, 2003. In the meantime there are also used to find the Tunggu Teduh Dulu serialized in the room of Utusan Malaysia and expired in December 2003. The novel was published by Penerbitan Se-lain (2004) and Ameen Publishing (2008). Another of his famous novel is 1511H Kombat by Utusan Publications and Distributors (2004). It won first place in the 2003 Utusan Malaysia-Exxon Mobil Literature Prize in 2003; and Advencer Si Peniup Ney by Utusan Publications and Distributors (2004). It won first place Hadiah Sastera Utusan Malaysia-Exxon Mobil in 2004.

He wrote the young adult novel Detektif Indigo in 2004, published by Utusan Publications and Distributors. It won second place Hadiah Sastera Utusan Malaysia-Exxon Mobil in 2004. In the meantime, he began composing the historical novel Surat-surat Perempuan Johor, which was released by Yayasan Warisan Johor in the following year. He won the Sayembara Novel Sejarah dan Tradisi Johor 1. The popularity of Detektif Jingga lead to a sequel titled Ikan Fugu, Lukisan & Jimson in 2007. In the academic papers 'Adolescent Knowledge Indexes in Detective Indigo' (2013), published in Malay Literature 26 (12): 80–99, two University Malaya scholars, Dr Tengku Intan Marlina Mohd Ali and Dr Salinah Ja'afar from the Malay Studies Academy stated that Detective Indigo novel is very loaded with science knowledge for teens and useful for practicing skills.

The Novel Tunggu Teduh Dulu and Surat-surat Perempuan Johor received praise by Siti Rabeah Masri, Kamariah Kamarudin and Pabiyah Hajimaming (Universiti Putra Malaysia) in their paper entitled 'The Muslim Woman's Personality and the Development of Insan Al-Kamil in the Novels of Faisal Tehrani and Isa Kamari ', published in Malay Literature 26 (1): 38-64; the scholars stated 'Faisal Tehrani's novels are more dominant in putting forth depictions Muslim women with extraordinary character.'

In 2007, Faisal Tehrani wrote Bedar Sukma Bisu, published by Dewan Bahasa dan Pustaka. It won the Sayembara Jubli Emas DBP general novel category. Bedar Sukma Bisu also won the Hadiah Sastera Perdana Malaysia 2006/2007. The work was translated into English under the title of The Prau with the Silent Soul in 2009 by Zawiyah Baba. SM Zakir in the paper The Myth and Religion in the Fu Numeral and The Prau With the Silent Soul (Bedar Sukma Bisu) published in Malay Literature 22 (2): 168–190, praising Faisal's uses of composed myth in the novel.

Manikam Kalbu by Dewan Bahasa dan Pustaka (2007). It won the Sayembara Jubli Emas DBP teens novel category. Manikam Kalbu was awarded the winner for the Teen Fiction Book of the Year category in the National Book Award at a ceremony held by the Ministry of Education and the National Book Council on 22 December 2009. Also won the Manikam Kalbu, Hadiah Sastera Perdana Malaysia 2006/2007. In a study, this novel is regarded as saturated with local knowledge by Dr Wan Zaliha Wan Othman and Professor Dr. Mohamad Mokhtar Abu Hassan.

Faisal continued the prolific producing Tuhan Manusia by Ameen Publishing (2007). Independent writer and director Amir Muhammad calls it "a provocative and surprising work. It is thematically conservative, but why should conservatives not be allowed to be provocative?" Faisal however disowned the work and Tunggu Teduh Dulu during a panel meeting at the Singapore Writers Festival 2015, saying it was just 'water under the bridge'. Mohd Faizal also refused to be associated with the movement of Islamic literature to the next phase of his writing, by asserting Islamic literature has distanced the audience and failed to achieve the purpose of humanity. Faisal, however, has yet to write anything critical essay about his points he is. The same thing he repeated during his opening remarks at the Fourth ASEAN Literary Festival in Jakarta, Indonesia. In 2017, ten years after the publication of Tuhan Manusia, Faisal stated in his column article in Free Malaysia Today that he hoped to rewrite the novel after believing the aspect of belief or religion was the affair between man and God.

He continued writing children's literature with Nama Beta Sultan Alauddin (2007) published Aberdeen World. In 2008, he released a continuation of the Detektif Indigo series, Detektif Indigo Kembali published by Ameen Publishing. It was followed by Ketupat Cinta, originally published in Harian Metro from 13 January to 5 August of the same year and reissued by Ameen Publishing as Ketupat Cinta Musim Pertama in 2009 followed by Ketupat Cinta Musim Kedua Penggal Pertama in 2012.

Then, another historical novel authored the issue Saasatul Ibaad Aberdeen World (2008) and a novel Bahlut about the origin issue Ameen Publishing (2010). In 2011, Faisal Tehrani produce novel Sebongkah Batu di Kuala Berang with PTS Litera.

In 2012, he released Perempuan Nan Bercinta published with the Institut Terjemahan Buku Malaysia (ITBM), which had caused repercussions by the government. It was later banned by the government of Malaysia in 2014. Undeterred by government pressure, he published the novel Bagaimana Anyss Naik Ke Langit with independent publisher DuBook Press that tells of the fate of an academic-activist who fights for the rights of the Penan people. Faisal also wrote a poem titled Di Tembok Berlin on the same year, which was dedicated to Chris Gueffroy, the last victim of the Berlin Wall who was killed on 5 February 1989. The poem was translated into German as An der Berliner Mauer by Hedy Holzwarth, Holger Warnke, and Volker Wolf in the Kuala Lumpur-Berlin anthology released by ITBM.

In the field of drama, Faisal Tehrani is work; Rintih Chicago (winning the Hadiah Sastera Perdana Malaysia 1996/97). Angin Madinah (Hadiah Sastera Berunsur Islam organized by Yayasan Pelajaran Islam Malaysia-DBP and won the Hadiah Sastera Perdana Malaysia 2000–2001). MISI (1999–2000) was sponsored by Dewan Bahasa dan Pustaka to carry around Malaysia, it was staged in Kota Kinabalu, Kuching and Penang. TiVi is an adaptation of a novella national laureate Shannon Ahmad and directed himself in 2003 and funded under the program by the Teater Kecil of the Sastera Kebangsaan Dewan Bahasa dan Pustaka.

Faisal also released a collection of short stories published by Sasbadi titled Sehari Dalam Perang (1997). Also mini collection of short stories published Sasbadi under the title Safari Gilgit (1997), a collection of short stories with Azman Husin in 2000, a collection of short stories ‘Lagi-Lagi Underground’ with Sharil Hasril Sanin 2002. Short story collection Perempuan Anggerik published DBP in 2002, this collection of short stories shortlisted for Hadiah Sastera Perdana Malaysia 2002/2003, kumpulan Cerpen Kekasih Sam Po Bo issue Aberdeen World (2006). In 2010 he published a collection of short stories Tiga Kali Seminggu.

In the field of poetry Faisal Tehrani came with his first collection of poetry, namely Ingin Jadi Nasrallah in 2010. It is published by Ameen Publishing. National Laureate Datuk Anwar Ridwan described Ingin Jadi Nasrallah as "a publication that highlights his talent as a poet. Some of his poems have thought deeply reinforced with imagery, metaphor, and diction effective."

He also writes creative writing handbook with the title Karya Nan Indah (Ameen Publishing, 2007).

== Adaptations of his works ==
A stage adaption of Monsopiad dan lain-lain Cerita was held from 5 to 7 December 2003 at the Esplanade in Singapore, funded by the National Art Council of Singapore. The play was nominated at the Cameronian Awards Award 2003 for the category of best Malay drama script.

Karbala (2008) published by Aberdeen World. 2 Jam Sebelum Sultan Alauddin Syahid Diracun staged on 25 to 29 August 2008 in the Auditorium Akademi Pengajian Islam UM and characterized by Pentas magazine Volume 3 Number 4 issue of the Palace of Culture as a 'staging the monumental'. On 13–16 August 2009 at Wisma ITNM (Institut Terjemahan Negara Malaysia), Faisal Tehrani back to lead a religious theater show Kopitiam Ghadir. It featured songs nasyid group singing 'Peace Culture Revolution'. Kopitiam Ghadir repeated the play on 1 to 4 July 2010. The drama Derik Kerisek published by Ameen Serve in 2011.

In 2011, members of the Kuala Lumpur City Hall Cultural Artists collective staged a play adaptation of his novel Nama Beta Sultan Alauddin in conjunction with the Kuala Lumpur Festival on the same year.

Beginning in 2012, TV2 had released a television adaptation of Pelangi Ada Tujuh Warna, which tells a female entrepreneur trapped in misyar often practiced by adherents of the Wahhabi ideology. The television directed by Bade and produced by actress Erma Fatima for. It is played by Ahmad Tarmimi Siregar and Lydiawati.

== Academic writing ==
In academia, Faisal known in the three disciplines of Comparative Literature, Syiahisme, and the field of Human Rights. Among his academic writings which had reference is The Malaysian Shi'a: A Preliminary Study of Their History, Oppression, and Denied Rights (2013), Axiology of Pilgrimage: Malaysian Shi'ites Ziyarat in Iran and Iraq (2013), Javanese Sufism and Prophetic Literature (2011), Pengantar Hak Asasi Manusia Moden dan Hujah Sangkalan Ia Bertentangan Dengan Islam (2015), Human Rights Lesson from Selected Malay Proverbs (2016) and Religious Freedom in Malaysia: The Reading of Qur’an 2:256 (2016) which is contained in The Qur’an in the Malay-Indonesian World under series Routledge Studies in the Qur’an. His expertise in academia is assessed by reference to the international standards.

There are also two books Sinema Spiritual: Dramaturgi dan Kritikan (published Unit Buku Harakah) and Wacana Sastera Islam di Malaysia dan Indonesia (published UPM) both published in 2012.

=== Translation work ===
There are two Faisal novels translated into English which, 1515, Shahnaz Mohd Said's translation into English. 1515 reversed the history of the Portuguese attack on Malacca by giving the success of the Malays through the heroic character of Tun Nyemah Mulia. The 272-page novel was published by the National Translation Institute of Malaysia (now known as the Institute of Translation and Book Malaysia or ITBM) in 2011.

Faisal's second novel translated Bedar Sukma Bisu, translated by Dato Zawiyah Baba, former Director of the National Library of Malaysia with the title The Prau with the Silent Soul (2009). The 250-page novel is also published by ITBM.

Four of his short stories can also be read in English the Perempuan Anggerik translated as The Orchid Lady (2000), translation Associate Professor Dr Noraini Md Yusof. It is published in Malay Literature 13 (1): 65–75. Madame short stories translated Cikgu Tomok by Kadir Ahmad for A Teacher for Tomok and published in Malay Literature 22 (1): 65–70. Cik Siti Mustika (2009), translated by National Laureate Professor Dr Muhammad Haji Salleh with the title Miss Siti Mustika and published in the anthology of short stories ITBM Sea of Rainbows. Seorang Muslim, Seorang Lutheran origin published by Malaysiakini dated 27 January 2014. Translation A Muslim, A Lutheran done by Yana Rizal.

Faisal poem entitled The Berlin Wall (2012) translated by Hedy Holzwarth, Holger Warnk, and Volker Wolf is included in Kuala Lumpur - Berlin / Berlin - Kuala Lumpur ITBM issue. The poem, whose translation is called An der Berliner Mauer, warned him to commemorating Chris Gueffroy, the last victim of the Berlin Wall who died on 5 February 1989.

'Bagaimana Anyss Naik ke Langit' translated into English as How Anyss Went to Heaven (2016), and published by DuBook Press.

1515 translated into French by Monique Zaini-Lajoubert, published by Les Indes Savantes in Paris (2016).

In 2019, The Professor, a novel heavily focused on human rights and touches on the issues of sexuality and blind religious obedience, was published by Gerak Budaya. It was translated by Brigitte Bresson.

== Controversies ==
=== Shia ===
In 2008, Mufti of Perlis Dr Mohd Asri Zainul Abidin whom often associated with Salafiism had written a letter to the chief editor of Harian Metro plus its copies to the Department of Islamic Development (JAKIM) and the Home Affairs Ministry alleging Faisal of spreading the teachings of Shia Islam –a very taboo topic on part of the Malaysian government– through one of the chapters published in the Ketupat Cinta series; which was further supported by JAKIM's Assistant Director for the Section of Aqidah, Mohd Aizam Mas’od. Apart from Mohd Asri, another Salafi figure who frequently accuses Faisal Tehrani as 'Shi'ite author' including Fathul Bari Mat Jahya. Due to the influence of Salafism takes place in Malaysia since the middle of 2000, the allegations of the preachers have affected Faisal Tehrani's authority as a creative author.

Faisal however denies such allegations and affirmed that he did not belong to this group, though he had stated his openness to the various schools of thought that have evolved in Islamic tradition; citing precedents like Syed Muhammad Naquib al-Attas and Burhanuddin al-Helmy with their efforts of reconciling syncretic Sunni and Shia traditions as a way of bridging understanding between both groups. Among the denials ever recorded is in his writing in Malaysiakini. However, Faisal's idea has not been accepted, and Mohd Azizuddin Mohd Sani, a lecturer at the School of International Studies, Universiti Utara Malaysia, said Faisal was one of the victims of the trend of the agenda of Islamic authorities to maintain its popularity.

In 2011, Faisal Tehrani produced a novel titled Sebongkah Batu in Kuala Berang with PTS Litera. On 5–6 October 2011, at the 79th Islamic Content Publishing Materials Committee Meeting Department of Islamic Development Malaysia (JAKIM) meeting, the novel Sebongkah Batu was banned.

No solid reason was given by the agency as a pretext for a ban. Sebongkah Batu in Kuala Berang however continues to be sold in the open market as JAKIM has no absolute power to prohibit books. In 2012, her work titled Perempuan Nan Bercinta published with the Malaysian Institute of Books (ITBM) once again raised furore. On 3 December 2013, Faisal Tehrani received a letter from the Publishing and Text Control Division of the Quran, the Home Ministry announced five of his works were banned by JAKIM. The works are Sebongkah Batu di Kuala Berang, Perempuan Nan Bercinta, drama Karbala, kumpulan puisi Ingin Jadi Nasrallah dan kumpulan cerpen Tiga Kali Seminggu.

In an interview with Wall Street Journal Faisal explains that the novel's claim was banned by Shiite elements, "In this book, Ali Taqi questioned whether the possibility of a school of thought in Islam could be utilized to resolve the problem and the clutter of the Islamic version faced by the Sunni school of thought, which is merely a discourse, an academic discourse, so the Professor asked, Sunni and Shia are jointly put together to help resolve disputes, conflicts and crises? It is a complex novel There are various thought ideas in it".

=== Human Rights in Literature ===
In 2008, Professor Dr. Nor Faridah Abdul Manaf from International Islamic University called Faisal as a bold author and never failed to voice the truth to the authorities compared to other authors in Malay literature that often chose a safe path. It is mentioned in his paper 'Human Rights and National Literature: A Comparative Study of the Experiences in Malaysia, Thailand and the Philippines' published in Asiatic 2 (2): 74–84. According to Uthaya Sankar SB, the fact that authors in Malaysia are afraid of the authorities to curb them to produce literary works capable of receiving the attention of the Nobel Prize, is not seen in the work of Faisal Tehrani.

Nowadays after various of controversies, Faisal is considered as the founder of the human rights movement in Malay literature. Among his works, which are evidently human rights include Homosektual short stories published in Mingguan Malaysia on 24 June 2012 and a short story translated by Yana Rizal for the Dialog Project site entitled A Muslim, A Lutheran published on 19 October 2015. In the year 2015, Faisal produced a children's book entitled 'Advencer Yaya and Fufu. Book 1: Jangan Cakap Begitu '. The Dubook Press publication briefly introduces Articles 1 and 2 of the Universal Declaration of Human Rights 1948 with the target audience under the age of five.

=== Reprimand from the United Nations ===
In May 2014, the United Nations Human Rights Organization in a formal communication ‘Communications report of Special Procedures: Communication Sent 1 March to 31 May 2014 Replies Received 1 May to 31 July 2014 Case Number MYS 4/2014’ A/HRC/27/72, 2014' has sent a letter to the Malaysian government asking for clarification of why the novel Perempuan Nan Bercinta is prohibited, and stated that it is a violation of human rights.

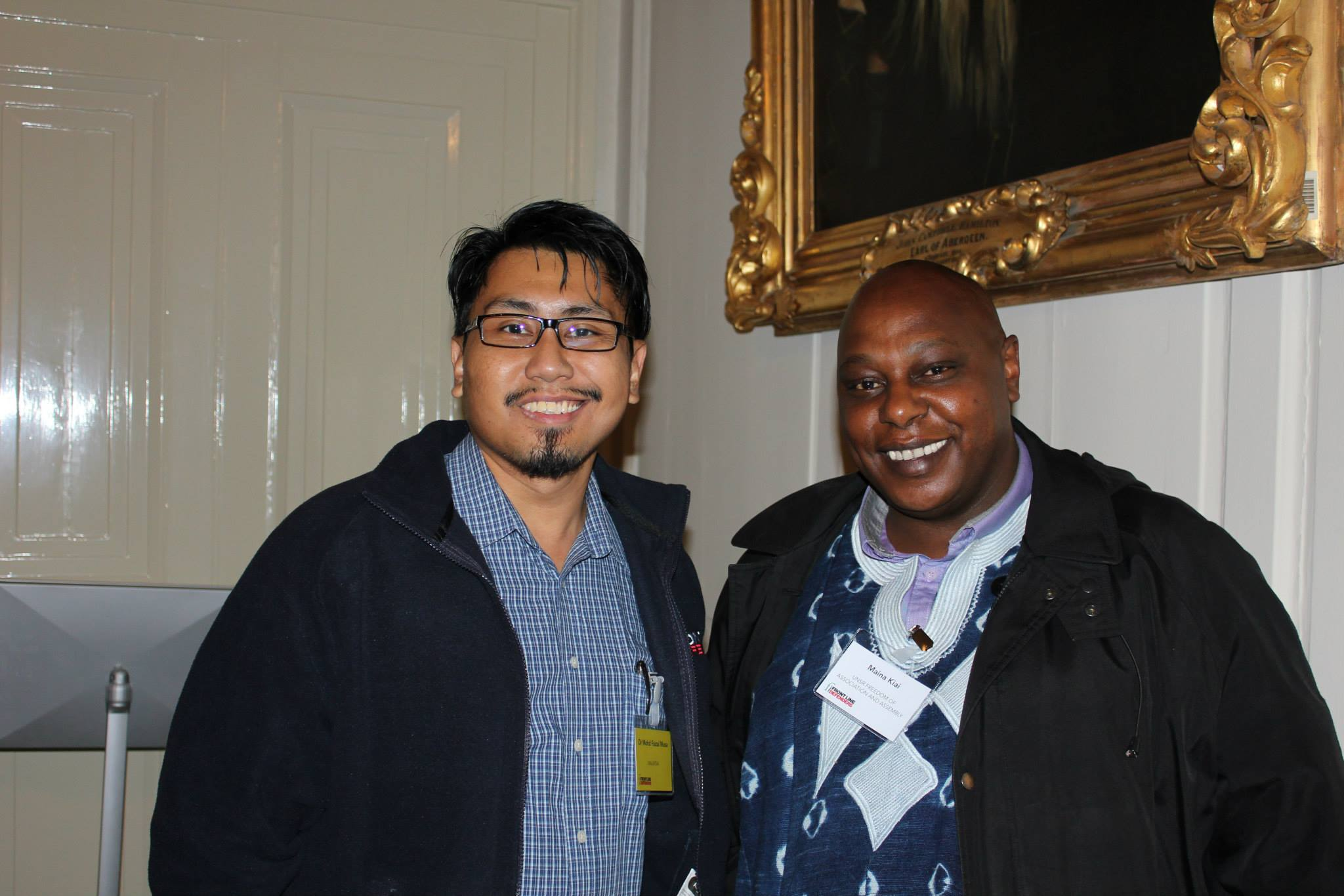
Dr Mohd Faizal Musa and Mr Maina Kiai, the United Nations Special Rapporteur on the Rights to Freedom of Peaceful Assembly and of Association.

In relation to that, the four United Nations Special Rapporteur has reprimanded the Malaysian government in a special communications 'AL Cultural rights (2009) G/SO 214 (67–17) Assembly & Association (2010–1) G/SO 214 (56–23) MYS 4/2014' on 27 May 2014. They mentioned two novels: 'Perempuan Nan Bercinta' and 'Sebongkah Batu Berang '. The Special Rapporteur considers the banning of these books is an act of intimidating and humiliating Faisal Tehrani, a human rights activist, as well as academicians studying in the field. The Special Rapporteur is; Special Rapporteur in the field of cultural rights; the Special Rapporteur on the promotion and protection of the right to freedom of opinion and expression; the Special Rapporteur on the rights to freedom of peaceful assembly and of association; and the Special Rapporteur on freedom of religion or belief. In the letter it is also possible for some other books to be prohibited.it. The Malaysian government ignored this reprimand, and even proceed with the banning of four Faisal Tehrani books effective 1 April 2015. 5.

Faisal Tehrani then challenged the banning of the four books on 29 June 2015 and requested a court review of the four books; Sebongkah Batu di Kuala Berang, Perempuan Nan Bercinta, Karbala drama, collection of Poetry, Ingin Jadi Nasrallah and a collection of short story of Tiga Kali Seminggugugu.

=== Liberal Islam ===
In addition to Shiite allegations, Faisal is also often mocked by a liberal title. Liberal Islam claims in Malaysia are often viewed negatively. Some of the accusations are Khalid Muammar A Harris who accuses Faisal of insulting Islamic institutions in this country and religious institutions. Faisal stressed that liberal lifestyles are not a negative, even claimed by the Rukun Negara, namely the national ideology of Malaysia; "The head of the Rukun Negara is often left behind by many people, so many are left behind or overlooked that Malaysia wants to" a liberal way of rich cultural tradition".

Faisal also believes that the influence of 'Literal Islam' or Salafism has make it complicated for the atmosphere of plurality and multiracial in Malaysia.

According to him, the situation in Malaysia is now rampant with teo-fascism and the hope to see Malaysia as a moderate Muslim country is straying away.

=== Death Threats ===
Since falling prey to accusations of Shi'ism and liberalism Mohd Faizal Musa often gets death threats. He has also faced several death threats made against him, in which he documents them on his Twitter account.

== Further development ==
Following the ban on Women Nan Bercinta, Faisal Tehrani seems to be submerged from the mainstream of Malaysian literature. However, his writings and excerpts can still be traced through his column at Malaysiakini BM which often accepts warm comments from readers. In 2014, after publishing How Anyss Going Up to Heaven (Bagaimana Anyss Naik Ke Langit) with the DuBook Press, Faisal republished his short stories in two previous underground short stories with Thukul Cetak publishers. The short story is titled Cerpen2 Underground (2015) with the addition of about 20 miniature short stories.

Faisal made a move to publish his first essay book entitled Aku______, Maka Aku Ada! (DuBook Press 2015). The book's cover presented him and his late Master Nik Abdul Aziz Nik Mat, and on his back cover written; ‘Usah ajari aku bagaimana menjadi Muslim. Engkau tidak semua tahu. Dan aku tidak selalu jahil’. (Do not teach me how to become a Muslim. You all do not know. And I'm not always ignorant)

On 6 May 2015, Faisal Tehrani was shocked when the Home Ministry decided to ban his four books Karbala(2008), Ingin Jadi Nasrallah (2010), Tiga Kali Seminggu (2010) and Sebongkah Batu di Kuala Berang (2011). The ban comes into effect on 1 April 2015.

Karbala, which was banned by the government, was the subject of study by Professor Dr Edwin Wierenga of the University of Cologne, Germany in his paper 'A Ta'ziya from 21st-century Malaysia: Faisal Tehrani's Passion Play Karbala'. It is included in the academic book titled 'Shi'ism in South East Asia' by Chiara Formichi's edits. This book is the publication of C Hurst & Co Publishers Ltd and goes on sale in the open market beginning 21 May 2015. 'Karbala' was once created in the Literature Hall from Vol. 36, No. 12 (2006). The Karbala Drama is serialized between December 2006 and July 2007.

Despite his pressure on Faisal, he published his second poem; The Mek Bah Bahia chapter published by Print (2015) and a children's book entitled ‘Advencer Yaya dan Fufu. Buku 1: Jangan Cakap Begitu’. This book briefly introduces Articles 1 and 2 of the Universal Declaration of Human Rights 1948 with the target audience below the age of five.

Mohd Faizal also produced a film in 2015 titled Leukerbad, which captures the travel of human rights activists in Geneva, Switzerland.

On 10 January 2018, the Court of Appeal quashed a Home's Ministry order banning four books authored by Faisal. A three-man panel comprising Tengku Maimun Tuan Mat, Ahmadi Asnawi and Zaleha Yusof found that the order issued on 12 Feb 2015, was not in accordance with Section 7 (1) of the Printing Presses and Publications Act 1984. Justice Zaleha, said that the order of banning the books was a restriction of Faisal's fundamental right of freedom of speech. Justice Zaleha also added, the books – Sebongkah Batu di Kuala Berang (published by PTS Litera Utama Sdn Bhd); Karbala (published by Aberdeen Books World), Tiga Kali Seminggu and Ingin Jadi Nasrallah (both published by Al-Ameen Serve Holdings Sdn Bhd) – were not a threat to national security and public order. The panels stated that they had read the books, and nothing comes to their attention and they could not apprehend how the four books could create public disorder or be a threat to the society.

On 27 June 2018, Faisal was called up by Putrajaya's Council of Eminent Persons to present his input on the way forward for Islamic bodies in Malaysia. Faisal was among scholars and activists called by the council to get feedback on the reform of Islamic institutions. Faisal suggested to the council that the advisers for religious agencies should also be academics such as anthropologists and sociologists. Faisal proposed that the government set up an advisory council comprising experts in religious and non-religious sciences to advise Islamic agencies in the country.

During and interview with Free Malaysia Today (FMT), on 19 July 2018, Faisal Tehrani warns of likely conservative backlash as the Pakatan Harapan triumph on the Malaysian 14th General Election, and the fall of Barisan Nasional government. Faisal Tehrani stated that 'he feels the fresh air of change' after the week Pakatan Harapan took over the administration. Faisal is optimistic about the serious changes that the 'new government' are bringing.

== Bibliography ==
- 1515 (2002)
- 1511H Kombat
- Perempuan Politikus Melayu (2000)
- Detektif Indigo (2004)
- Advencer Si Peniup Ney
- Bedar Sukma Bisu (2007) / The Prau with the Silent Soul (2009)
- Cinta Hari-Hari Rusuhan
- Ikan, Fugu, Lukisan dan Jimson (2007)
- Maaf Dari Sorga
- Rahsia Ummi (2003)
- Surat-Surat Perempuan Johor (2005)
- Tunggu Teduh Dulu
- Bila Tuhan Berbicara
- Tuhan Manusia (2007)
- Nama Beta Sultan Alauddin (2007)
- Manikam Kalbu (2007)
- Karya Nan Indah
- Karbala (2008)#
- Perempuan Nan Bercinta# (2012)
- Detektif Indigo Kembali (2008)
- Saasatul Ibaad (2008)
- Sebongkah Batu di Kuala Berang# (2011)

#: banned by Home Ministry of Malaysia under claims of promoting Shia Islam—a highly volatile issue by the Malaysian Government—which are detrimental to public order and safety of Sunni Muslims in Malaysia.
