= Abu-Abdullah Adelabu =

Nigerian Muslim scholar

Abdul-Fattah Abu-Abdullah Taiye Ejire Adelabu عبد الفتّاح أبو عبد الله تَائيي أيجيري أديلابو FRSA
- Born: Osogbo, Osun State, Nigeria

Philosophical work
- Era: Modern era
- Region: Muslim scholar
- School: Sunni
- Website: EsinIslam.Com

Abdul-Fattah Abu-Abdullah Taiye Ejire Adelabu (Arabic: عبد الفتّاح أبو عبد الله تَائيي أيجيري أديلابو) FRSA or simply Sheikh Adelabu (الشيخ أديلابو), also known as Al-Afriqi (الإفريقي) or Shaykh Al-Afriqi (الشيخ الإفريقي) is a Nigerian-British Muslim scholar, writer, academic, publisher and cleric from Osogbo, the capital city of Osun State, Nigeria.

Adelabu studied Arabic and Islamic studies in Damascus, Syria, and acquired a post-graduate diploma, Master's degree, and Ph.D.

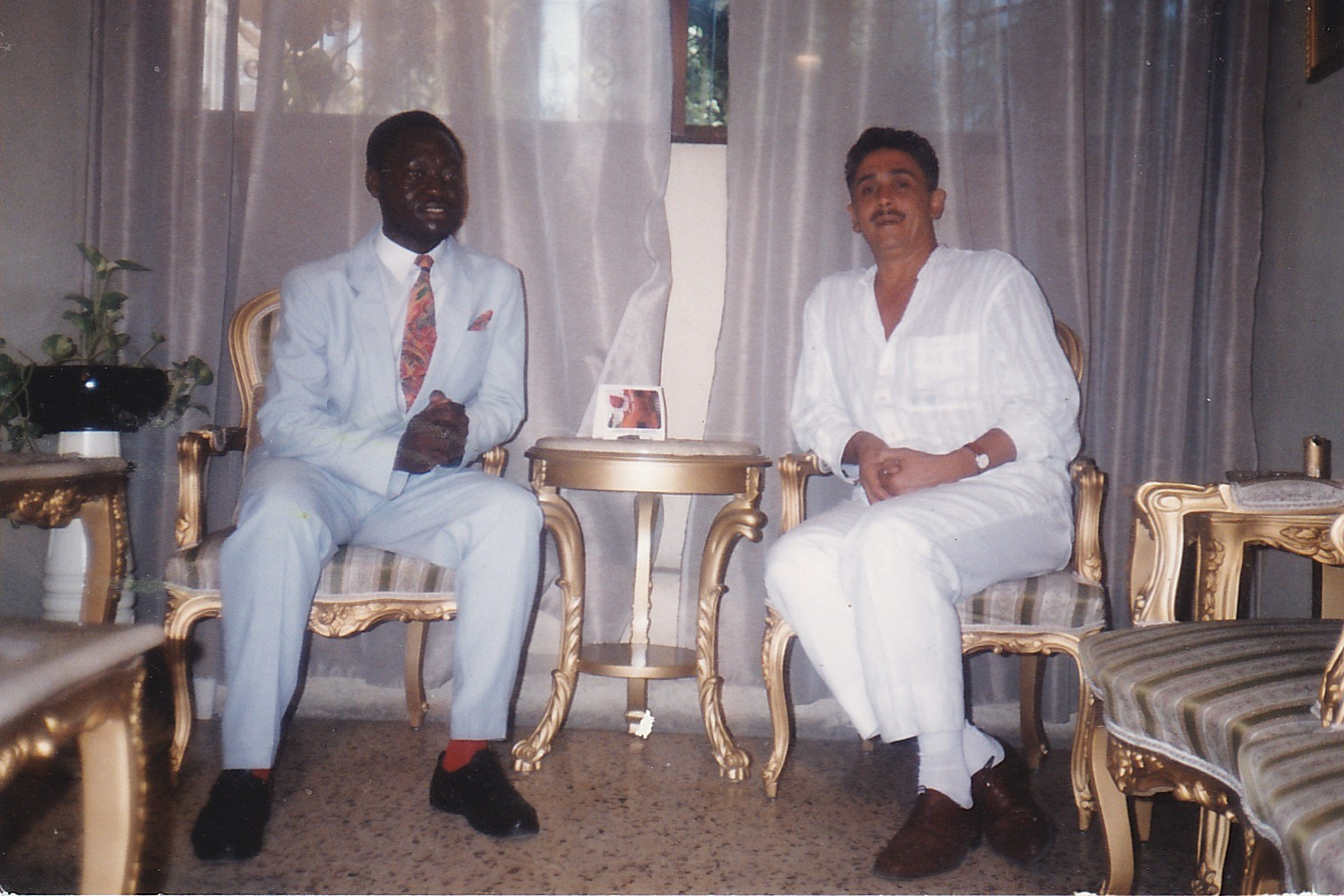
Adelabu received mid-1990's by influential Syrian officials in Damascus to discuss his ideas and services for African students and stranded migrants.

== In the United Kingdom ==
Adelabu was a researcher in Arabic and Islamic studies in Oxford, Cambridge and London in the late 1990s. A scholar of Islamic and Arabic studies as well as a linguist, jurist and lecturer, Adelabu is the founder and first president of Awqaf Africa and Awqaf Africa Muslim Open College in London where he lectures on Arabic and Islamic studies.

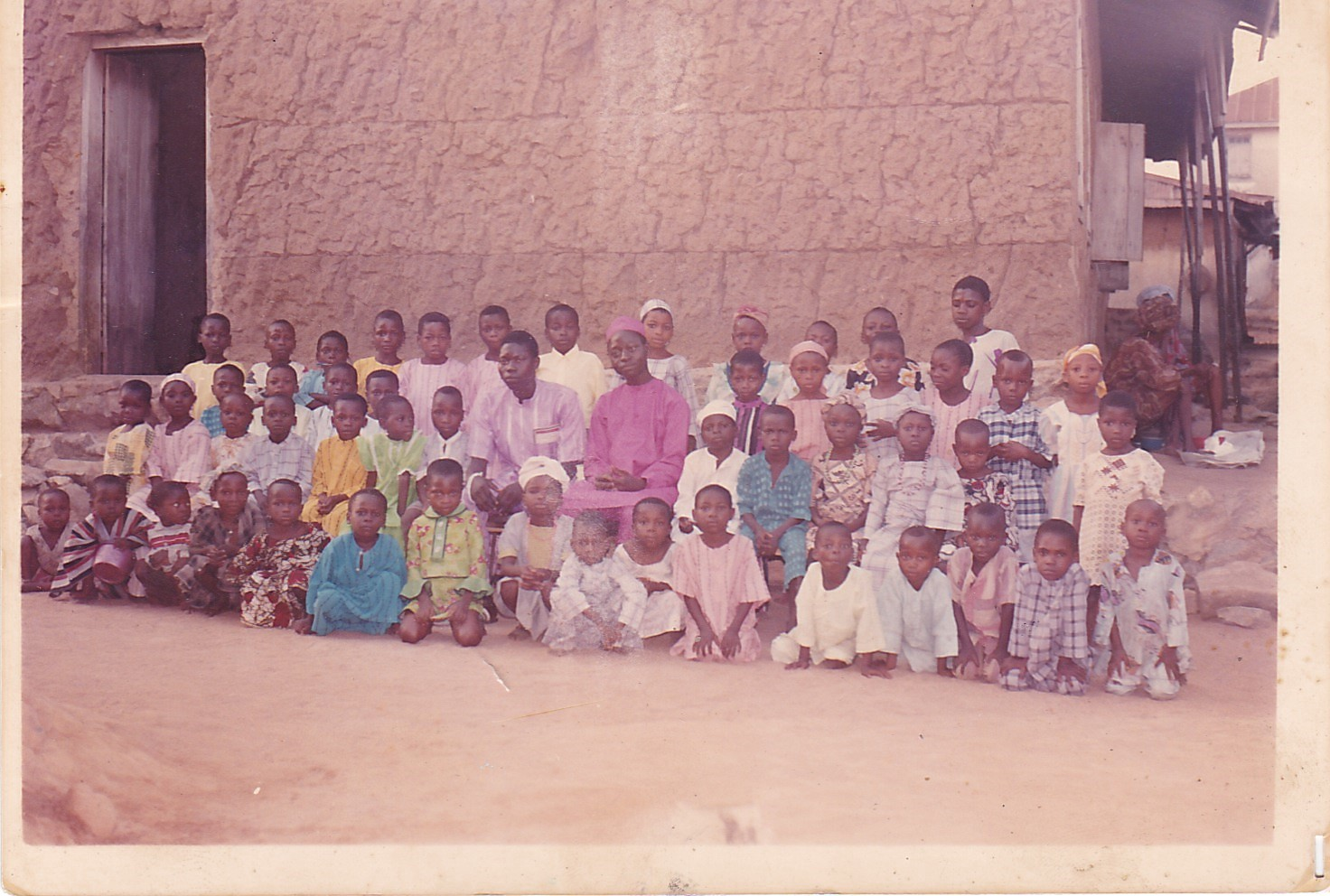
Adelabu in the early 1980s set up a free, local school for children with his older Quranic students his assistants

His academic works and publications include an Arabic-English dictionary, an encyclopedic dictionary of the Quran and Sunnah, Islam in Africa - West African in particular, and missionary and colonization in Africa. He also founded and published in the United Kingdom 1998 Delab International - an African-Asian Middle East magazine and journal covering religion, politics, sociology, and literature.

Adelabu founded the African Muslim portal EsinIslam.Com and IslamAfrica.Com, both of which are administered and directed by his wife as the director and editor-in-chief, with management by volunteers from the students and followers of Adelabu, especially at Awqaf Africa and its Islamic College in London.

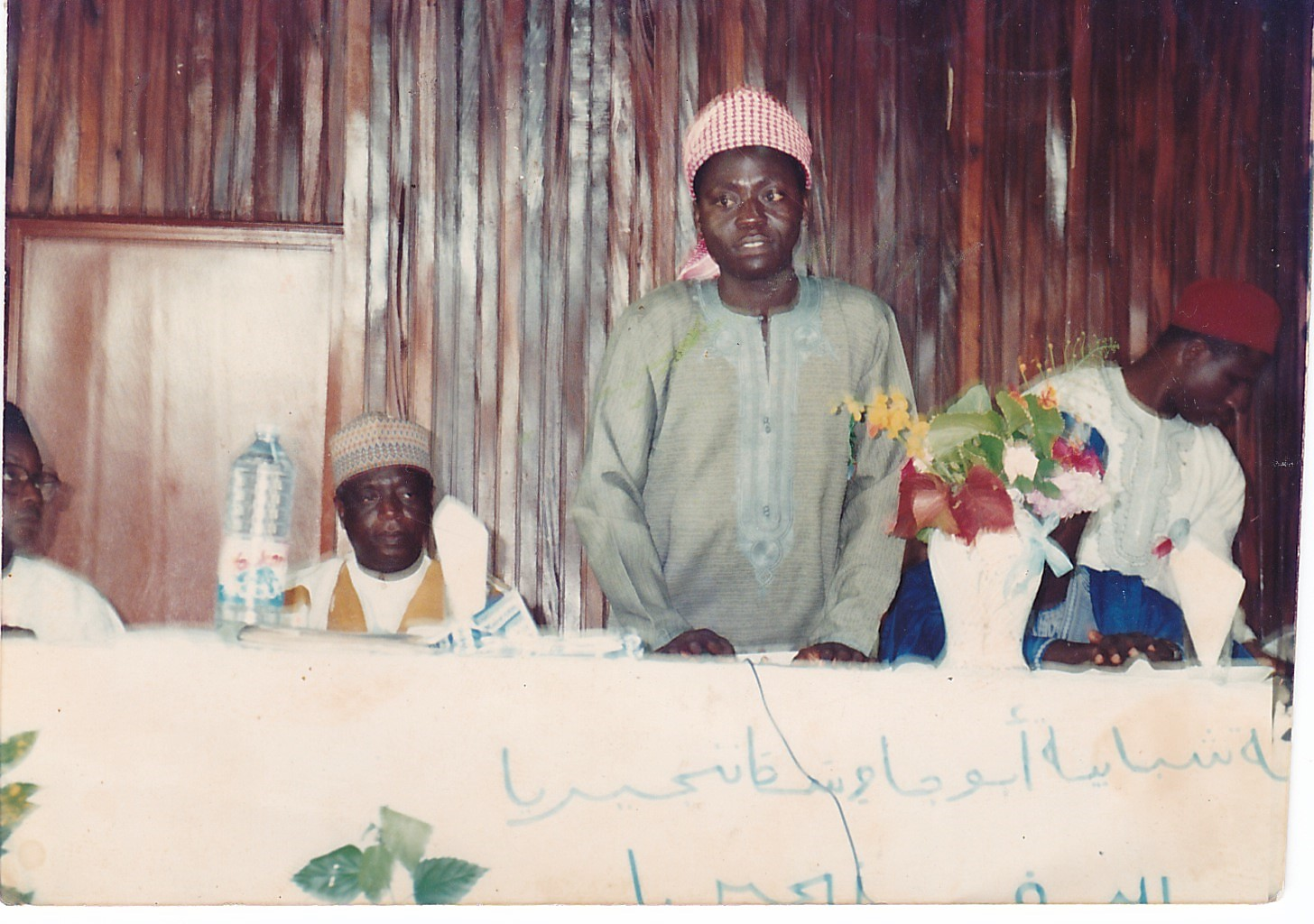
Adelabu in 1989 as the first Yoruba chief imam during a national conference in Garki, Abuja Nigeria

Da’wah activities of the African academic include serving as an Imam Khatib previously as Kuwaiti cultural attaché London, working as Islamic columnist for the Libyan Arabic daily newspaper Al-Arab International in London, and serving as the first Chief Imam and Chief Missioner for the Islamic Youth League of Nigeria, Abuja.

In the UK, Adelabu's educational and community contributions include appointments as a school governor in several boards, schools and academies in London where he was school parent governors' ambassador and representative at Westminster City Council sitting 2013 on the children and community services policy and scrutiny committee, as well as serving as vice chair of tri-borough school forums for Royal Borough of Kensington and Chelsea RBKC, London Borough of Hammersmith & Fulham LBHF and Westminster City.

== In Syria ==
Adelabu was a postgraduate in Damascus in the early 1990s when Syria reviewed its national security after the Oslo Accords. Syria, like many other countries around the world, witnessed during this period, a flood of refugees from war troubled nations like Somalia, the arrival of people from Algeria during the civil war, resettlement of Palestinians as well as other African migration for many other reasons. As a delegate of the African Students Union and general secretary of the West African Students' Union in Syria, Lebanon, and Jordan, Adelabu visited prisons and hospitals during the time when over 10,000 African migrants had been killed, jailed, or wounded in their adventures to reach the Middle-East, many for sanctuary and others to get to Europe for what they had expected to be a better life.

Horrified at the number of unknown or unclaimed dead among the immigrant prisoners and their wounded countrymen, women, and children in the hospitals, Adelabu formed a group of volunteer African students to help. He received huge support from the president of the Syrian Scientific Academy and chancellor of the University of Arabic and Islamic Studies, Abdullatif Salih al-Farfur, and from the dean of postgraduate school at the university, Shawkiy Abu Khalil, the dean of the faculty of literature - both signatories to the fellowship at the Syrian Scientific Academy. Adelabu called for wider adoption of Islamic values which he claimed would bring about lasting and positive changes while learning from the effects of colonization, slavery, and power struggles. It is reported that influential people met with him in mid-1995 to discuss his ideas.

== Mashayikh Adelabu ==
Adelabu studied under scholars in Syria, Saudi Arabia and Jordan. Among his teachers and mentors are:

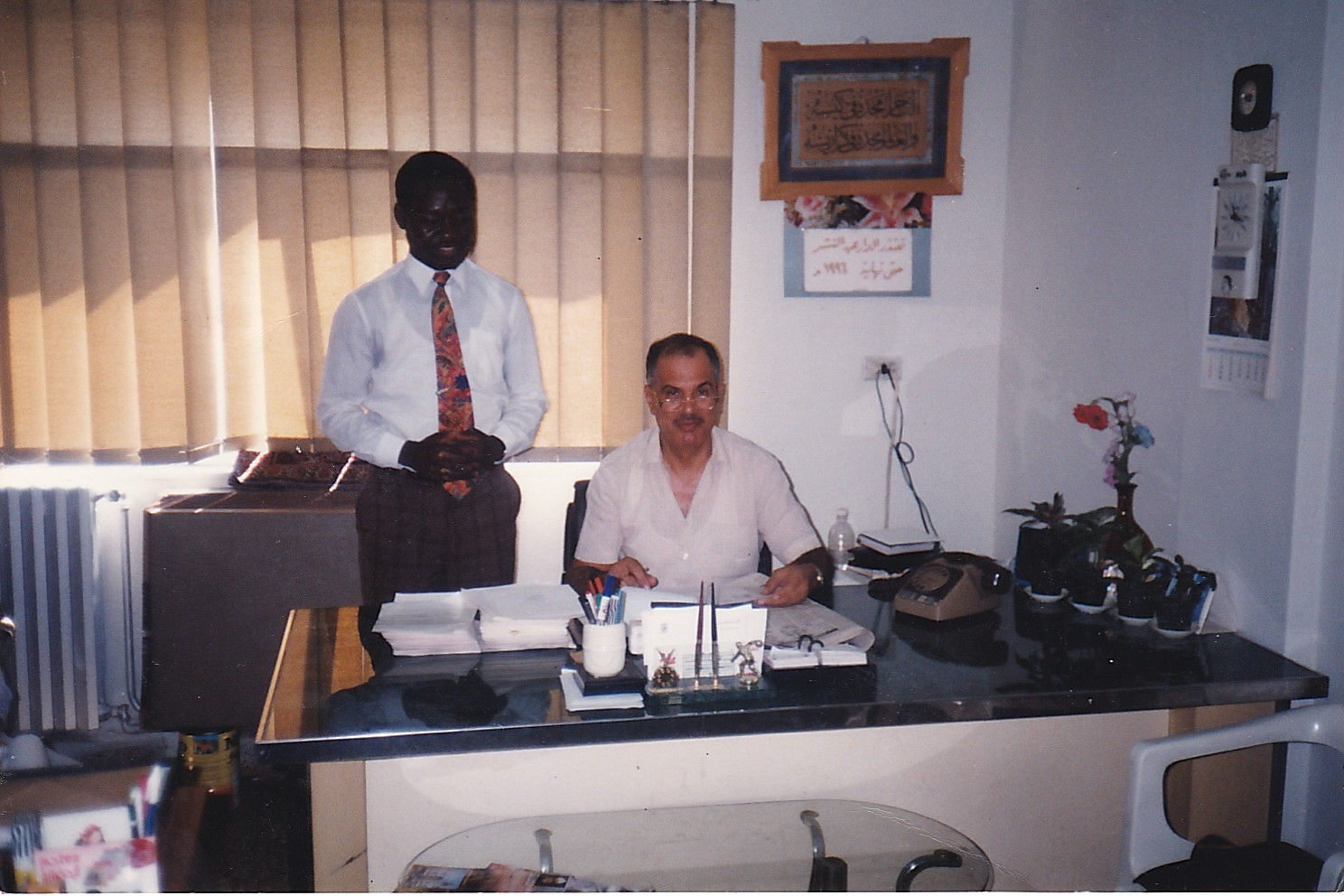
Adelabu and his PhD thesis with Shawkiy Abu Khalil at Baramkeh Campus, Damascus

- Abdul Qader Arnaoot,
- Shawkiy Abu Khalil,
- Muhammad Sa'id Ramadan al-Buti,
- Muhammad Nasiruddin al-Albani,
- Abdul-Latif Salih Al-Farfur,
- Abd-al-Aziz ibn Abd-Allah ibn Baaz,
- Muhammad ibn al Uthaymeen,
- Wahbah al-Zuhayli,
- Shuaib Al Arna'ut,
- Mustapha Al-Bouga,
- Muhammad Said Al-Qasimi.

Based in London, Adelabu's works and initiatives pioneering teachings and publications of his teachers and mentors like these have led many to credit the Nigeria-born British Syria graduate with the continued spread of (esp. Salafi) Islam in Nigeria and other countries around the world today.
