= Jemoreng =

State constituency in Sarawak, Malaysia

Jemoreng (N44)
Sarawak constituency

State constituency
- Legislature: Sarawak State Legislative Assembly
MLA
Vacant
- Constituency created: 2005
- First contested: 2006
- Last contested: 2026

Jemoreng is a state constituency in Sarawak, Malaysia, that has been represented in the Sarawak State Legislative Assembly since 2006.

The state constituency was created in the 2005 redistribution and is mandated to return a single member to the Sarawak State Legislative Assembly under the first past the post voting system.

== Demographics ==
Ethnic breakdown of Jemoreng's electorate as of 2022
1. Malay-Muslim bumiputera (88.8%)
2. Sarawak bumiputera (6.50%)
3. Chinese (4.00%)
4. Other ethnicities (0.70%)

== History ==
As of 2020, Jemoreng has a population of 12,979 people.

=== Polling districts ===
According to the gazette issued on 31 October 2022, the Jemoreng constituency has a total of 10 polling districts.

State constituency	Polling Districts	Code	Location
Jemoreng (N44)	Kuala Matu	207/44/01	SK Bruan Mapal; SK Kuala Matu; SK Kpg. Pergau
Jemoreng (N44)	Sok	207/44/02	SK Sok
Jemoreng (N44)	Matu	207/44/03	Perpustakaan Majlis Daerah Matu-Daro
Jemoreng (N44)	Sekaan Besar	207/44/04	Bangunan Pusat Sumber JKKK Kpg. Tering; SK Orang Kaya Selair Kpg. Sekaan
Jemoreng (N44)	Jemoreng	207/44/05	SK Orang Kaya Sergunim Jemoreng
Jemoreng (N44)	Bawang	207/44/06	SK Sekaan Kechil; Dewan Kpg Bawang
Jemoreng (N44)	Tian	207/44/07	SK Bawang Tian
Jemoreng (N44)	Bekumah	207/44/08	SK Kampung Kebuaw
Jemoreng (N44)	Ilas	207/44/09	SK Sg. Ilas
Jemoreng (N44)	Igan	207/44/10	SK Kpg. Igan

=== Representation history ===
Members of the Legislative Assembly for Jemoreng
Assembly	No	Years	Member	Party
Constituency created, split from Matu-Daro, Dalat and Bawang Assan
16th	N38	2006-2011	Gani @ Abu Seman Jahwie	BN (PBB)
17th	N38	2011-2016	Gani @ Abu Seman Jahwie	BN (PBB)
18th	N44	2016–2018	Juanda Jaya	BN (PBB)
18th	N44	2018-2021	Juanda Jaya	GPS (PBB)
19th	N44	2021–2026	Juanda Jaya	GPS (PBB)

== Election results ==
Sarawak state election, 2026: Jemoreng
Party	Candidate	Votes	%	∆%
GPS				▲
PH				▲
Total valid votes				
Total rejected ballots				
Unreturned ballots				
Turnout				
Registered electors				
Majority				

Sarawak state election, 2021: Jemoreng
Party	Candidate	Votes	%	∆%
GPS	Juanda Jaya	5,623	86.80	▲86.80
Independent	Osman Rafaee	611	9.43	▼10.29
Amanah	Zainab Suhaili	244	3.77	▲0.92
Total valid votes		6,478	100.00	
Total rejected ballots		115		
Unreturned ballots		36		
Turnout		6,629	66.54	▼2.84
Registered electors		9,963		
Majority		5,012	77.37	▲19.66
GPS gain from BN		Swing		?
Source(s) https://lom.agc.gov.my/ilims/upload/portal/akta/outputp/1718688/PUB687.pdf

Sarawak state election, 2016: Jemoreng
Party	Candidate	Votes	%	∆%
BN	Juanda Jaya	5,084	77.43	▲4.31
Independent	Abdullah Saminan	1,295	19.72	▲19.72
Amanah	Kiprawi Suhaili	187	2.85	▲2.85
Total valid votes		6,566	100.00	
Total rejected ballots		133		
Unreturned ballots		30		
Turnout		6,729	69.38	▼3.52
Registered electors		9,699		
Majority		3,789	57.71	▲10.22
BN hold		Swing		
Source(s) "Federal Government Gazette - Notice of Contested Election, State Legislative Assembly of the State of Sarawak [P.U. (B) 190/2016]" (PDF). Attorney General's Chambers of Malaysia. 25 April 2016. Archived from the original (PDF) on 2017-06-12. "Senarai Calon yang Disahkan Layak Bertanding Pilihan Raya Dewan Undangan Negeri ke-11". Election Commission of Malaysia. 25 April 2016. Archived from the original on 25 April 2016.

Sarawak state election, 2011: Jemoreng
Party	Candidate	Votes	%	∆%
BN	Gani @ Abu Seman Jahwie	4,505	73.12	▲7.36
Independent	Abdul Hafiz Noh	1,579	25.63	▲25.63
Independent	Asbor Abdullah	77	1.25	▲1.25
Total valid votes		6,161	100.00	
Total rejected ballots		120		
Unreturned ballots		14		
Turnout		6,295	72.90	▲8.29
Registered electors		8,635		
Majority		2,926	47.49	▲15.96
BN hold		Swing		
Source(s) "Federal Government Gazette - Results of Contested Election and Statements of the Poll after the Official Addition of Votes Sarawak [P.U. (B) 245/2011]" (PDF). Attorney General's Chambers of Malaysia. 29 April 2011.

Sarawak state election, 2006: Jemoreng
Party	Candidate	Votes	%
BN	Gani @ Abu Seman Jahwie	3,567	65.76
Independent	Nasaruddin Abdullah	1,857	34.24
Total valid votes		5,424	100.00
Total rejected ballots		96	
Unreturned ballots		1	
Turnout		5,521	64.61
Registered electors		8,545	
Majority		1,710	31.53
This was a new constituency created.
