= Mohd Asri Zainul Abidin =

Malaysian Islamic preacher (born 1971)

Yang Berbahagia Sahibus Samahah Prof. Dato' Arif Perkasa Dr. Mohd Asri Zainul Abidin SSP
- محمد عصري زين العابدين
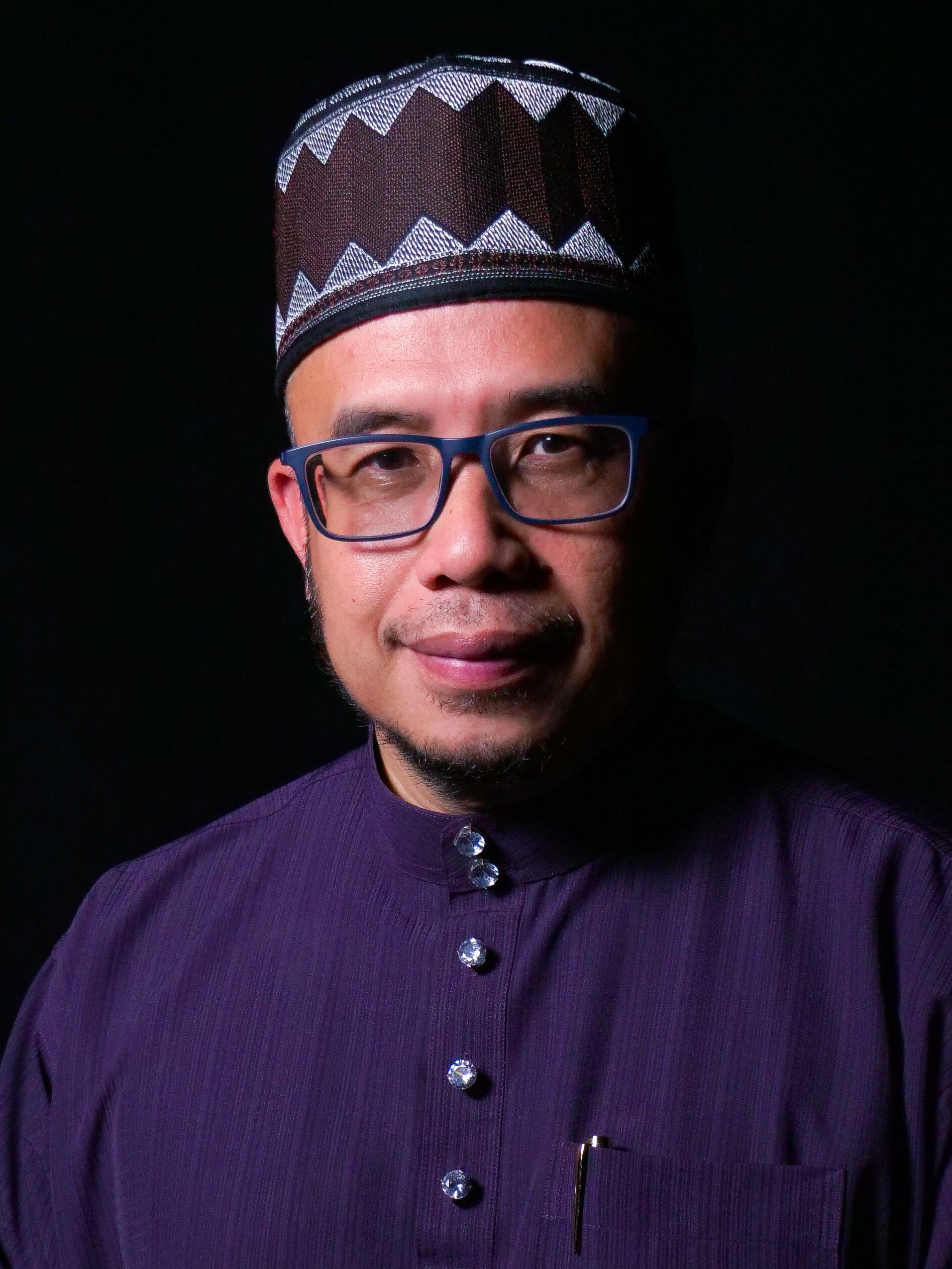
- Mohd Asri in 2022

Mufti of Perlis
- Incumbent
- Assumed office 2 February 2015
- Preceded by: Juanda Jaya
- In office 1 November 2006 – 11 November 2008
- Preceded by: Mat Jahaya Hussin
- Succeeded by: Juanda Jaya

Personal details
- Born: Mohd Asri bin Zainul Abidin; January 1, 1971 (age 55) Bukit Mertajam, Penang, Malaysia
- Children: 5
- Education: Sultan Alam Shah Islamic College
- Alma mater: University of Jordan (BA); University of Science Malaysia (MA); International Islamic University Malaysia (PhD)
- Occupation: Mufti, Imam, lecturer
- Other names: Abu Talhah Al-Malizi, Imam Al-Malizi, Dr. MAZA

Personal life
- Known for: Salafism

Religious life
- Religion: Islam

Muslim leader
- Influenced by: Ibn Taymiyyah, Ibn Qayyim, Ibn Hanbal, Yusuf Al-Qaradawi, Wahbah al-Zuhayli, Nik Aziz Nik Mat, Al-Albani, Muhammad ibn al-Uthaymin, Al-Nawawi, Hasan Al-Basri, and others.
- Influenced: Rozaimi Ramle

Mohd Asri bin Zainul Abidin (Jawi: محمد عصري بن زين العابدين; born 1 January 1971), better known by his acronyms Dr. MAZA, also known as Abu Talhah Al-Malizi, is an Islamic scholar, preacher, writer and lecturer serving as the Mufti of Perlis since 2 February 2015, having previously served in the same role from 1 November 2006 until 11 November 2008.

== Early life and education ==
Mohd Asri was educated at the religious secondary school Al-Irsyad in Seberang Perai, Penang, and furthered his study at the Islamic College Klang. He received his bachelor's degree in Arabic and Sharia, with honors from the University of Jordan; a Master's in Islamic studies from Universiti Sains Malaysia (USM), and a PhD in Islamic Revealed Knowledge and Heritage (Qurʾan and Sunnah studies) from International Islamic University Malaysia.

== Career ==
Mohd Asri is an active writer and commentator on Islam and religious issues. He was a columnist for two local Malay newspapers called Mingguan Malaysia and Sinar Harian. He is also a prolific writer who has published many books since 2003. He remains a permanent associate professor with Universiti Sains Malaysia while serving with the Office of Perlis Mufti. Known popularly by the public, especially among the young who follow his blog, Minda Tajdid and in columns on Malay newspapers.

== Views and principles ==
Mohd Asri's books reflect his concerns about what he considers to be fanaticism in Madhhabs (schools of jurisprudence), criticism of Hadith fabrications, and condemnation of Shiʿism and some Sufi practices. He considers these phenomena not to be in line with “pure” Islam, and he has urged Muslims to return to what he believes are Islam's true teachings. He frequently cites sources often referred to by those conforming to the Wahabi and Salafi school of thought, such as Ibn Taymiyyah (d. 1328) and Muhammad bin Abdul Wahab, particularly in the issues of human life and human rights, and accepts moderate ideas from the Salafi and Wahabi school. Unlike the perception that associates Salafism with rigidity, conservatism, and extremism in the Middle East, particularly in Saudi Arabia, Asri believes in the Salafi brand of “Sunnah Perlis”, emphasizing the freedom from Madhhab rigidity that calls upon Muslims to return directly to the two major sources of Islam in dealing with religious issues, namely, the Qurʾan and Sunnah.

While Mohd Asri may be conservative on many aspects of religious rituals, some of his views on women's rights, religious freedom, and religious worship are largely recognized as progressive. He also urges Malaysian Muslims not to accept the Shafiʿi school as the only source of law, but to be more receptive of other schools of jurisprudence. This position departs from that advocated by the ulama in the Nusantara region, which largely adopts the Shafiʿi school.

Although he maintains an intentionally apolitical stance, political parties like the United Malays National Organization (UMNO) and People Justice Party (PKR) are interested in him. As Mufti of Perlis, he is propagating the “Sunnah Perlis” teachings, the Salafi version of a revival and reform agenda (islah and tajdid), and its call for the “pure” version of Islam by referring directly to the Qurʾan and Sunnah and by superseding the various interpretations the different Madhhab.

== Criticisms ==
While some have accused Mohd Asri of subscribing to Wahhabism, others claim he does not accept Muhammad ibn Abd al-Wahhab (1703–1792) as a great scholar or consider him a moderate and progressive scholar. Mohd Asri can be characterized as a moderate scholar who urges Muslims to practice more than one Madhhab simultaneously within Sunni Islamic doctrine, namely the Hanbali, Shafiʿi, Maliki, and Hanafi schools.

He is very vocal on Malaysia's political and religious contexts, and in criticizing the labeling of certain non-Muslim parties, especially the opposition Democratic Action Party (DAP) as kafir harbi (infidels against whom war can be waged) and efforts to amend the Syariah (the term used in Malaysia for Sharia) Courts (Criminal Jurisdiction) Act 1965 to allow certain Hudud punishments to be implemented in certain states in Malaysia.

On issues such as the environment, he is against pollution. He advocates modesty in fashion, particularly the proper attire for Muslim women, and that Muslims can wear non-Muslim traditional dresses.

== Personal life ==
Mohd Asri is married with five children, namely Talhah Mohd Asri, Intisor Mohd Asri, Ibtihal Mohd Asri, Dihyah Mohd Asri and Irwa' Mohd Asri, respectively.

== Honours and awards ==
=== Honours of Malaysia ===
- Perlis
  - Recipient of the Order for Dato' Titleholders – Dato' Arif Perkasa (2012)
  - Companion of the Order of Prince Syed Sirajuddin Jamalullail of Perlis (SSP) (2005)

=== Awards ===
- Recipient of the Perlis 1427 AH Maal Hijrah Figure Award
- Recipient of the Perlis 1429 AH Maal Hijrah Figure Award
- Recipient of the University of Science Malaysia 1430 AH Maal Hijrah Figure Award

== Books ==
- Fanatik Mazahab Fekah & Kesan Negatifnya Terhadap Pemikiran Umat ISBN 978-967-13496-2-5
- Hadis Palsu Kesan Negatif Terhadap Imej Islam ISBN 978-967-13496-3-2
- Fabricated Hadith Upon The Image Of Islam ISBN 978-967-16744-3-7
- The Obligation of Understanding the Reality Before Issuuing a Fatwa ISBN 978-967-16744-5-1
- Kewajipan Memahami Realiti Sebelum Berfatwa ISBN 978-967-16-7442-0
