= Kakus =

Kakus (N60)
Sarawak constituency

State constituency
- Legislature: Sarawak State Legislative Assembly
MLA
Vacant
- Constituency created: 1987
- First contested: 1991
- Last contested: 2026

Kakus is a state constituency in Sarawak, Malaysia, that has been represented in the Sarawak State Legislative Assembly since 1991.

The state constituency was created in the 1987 redistribution and is mandated to return a single member to the Sarawak State Legislative Assembly under the first past the post voting system.

== Demographics ==
Ethnic breakdown of Kakus's electorate as of 2022
1. Sarawak bumiputera (90.2%)
2. Chinese (4.70%)
3. Malay-Muslim bumiputera (4.50%)
4. Other ethnicities (0.60%)

== History ==
As of 2020, Kakus has a population of 34,520 people.

=== Polling districts ===
According to the gazette issued on 31 October 2022, the Kakus constituency has a total of 25 polling districts.

State constituency	Polling Districts	Code	Location
Kakus (N60)	Bawan	214/60/01	SK Sungai Duan
Kakus (N60)	Arip	214/60/02	SK Sg. Anak; RH Jilum Ng. Bawang; SK Sg. Tau; SK Sg. Bawang; SK Ulu Arip; SK Iban Union
Kakus (N60)	Tatau-Buan	214/60/03	SK Tatau
Kakus (N60)	Kakus	214/60/04	SK RH Kesing Tatau
Kakus (N60)	Anap	214/60/05	RH Merayang Ng. Malat
Kakus (N60)	Tatau	214/60/06	SJK (C) Chung Hua Tatau
Kakus (N60)	Lubok Kempai	214/60/07	SK RH Tayai
Kakus (N60)	Bekiran	214/60/08	RH Wilson Blue Rantau Belak
Kakus (N60)	Tekalit	214/60/09	SK Sg. Bagian
Kakus (N60)	Rungan	214/60/10	RH Pandong Ng. Kakus
Kakus (N60)	Giri	214/60/11	RH Giri Sg. Senunok
Kakus (N60)	Kelebu	214/60/12	RH Jimbai Ng. kelebu
Kakus (N60)	Entajum	214/60/13	RH Radin Entajum
Kakus (N60)	Ulu Sangan	214/60/14	RH Ngindang Anak Guan (Ulu Sangan)
Kakus (N60)	Sangan	214/60/15	SK Sangan Iban
Kakus (N60)	Penyarai	214/60/16	SK Kuala Penyarai Kakus
Kakus (N60)	Kuala Belungai	214/60/17	RH Edwin Ng. Kulau Kakus; RH Natok Bilong
Kakus (N60)	Muput	214/60/18	RH Agau Sg. Muput
Kakus (N60)	Pasir Nangka	214/60/19	SK RH Barrau
Kakus (N60)	Nangka Empang	214/60/20	RH Ahsoon Ng. Empang
Kakus (N60)	Kana	214/60/21	SK Kuala Muput
Kakus (N60)	Setusor	214/60/22	RH Jemat Ng. Setusor
Kakus (N60)	Tau	214/60/23	SK Ng. Tau
Kakus (N60)	Takan	214/60/24	RH Enteri Ng. Takan
Kakus (N60)	Annau	214/60/25	Tadika Kemas RH Mat Separai; SK Kelawit

=== Representation history ===
Members of the Legislative Assembly for Kakus
Assembly	No	Years	Member	Party
Constituency created from Tatau and Balingian
13th	N44	1991-1996	John Sikie Tayai	PBDS
14th	N47	1996-2001	John Sikie Tayai	BN (PBDS)
15th	N47	2001–2002	John Sikie Tayai	BN (PBDS)
15th	N47	2002-2006	John Sikie Tayai	BN (PRS)
16th	N53	2006–2011	John Sikie Tayai	BN (PRS)
17th	N53	2011–2016	John Sikie Tayai	BN (PRS)
18th	N60	2016–2018	John Sikie Tayai	BN (PRS)
18th	N60	2018-2021	John Sikie Tayai	GPS (PRS)
19th	N60	2021–2026	John Sikie Tayai	GPS (PRS)

== Election results ==
Sarawak state election, 2026: Kakus
Party	Candidate	Votes	%	∆%
GPS				▲
PH				▲
Total valid votes				
Total rejected ballots				
Unreturned ballots				
Turnout				
Registered electors				
Majority				

Sarawak state election, 2021: Kakus
Party	Candidate	Votes	%	∆%
GPS	John Sikie Tayai	5,307	52.35	▲52.35
PSB	Peter Tuan	3,410	33.64	▲33.64
Independent	Ugik Selipih	546	5.39	▲5.39
PKR	Joshua Jabeng	375	3.70	▼15.95
PBK	Philip Kelanang Diun	337	3.32	▲3.32
Independent	Tiun Kanun	162	1.60	▲1.60
Total valid votes		10,137	100.00	
Total rejected ballots		122		
Unreturned ballots		21		
Turnout		10,280	71.31	▼2.72
Registered electors		14,416		
Majority		1,897	18.71	▼36.62
GPS gain from BN		Swing		?
Source(s) https://lom.agc.gov.my/ilims/upload/portal/akta/outputp/1718688/PUB687.pdf

Sarawak state election, 2016: Kakus
Party	Candidate	Votes	%	∆%
BN	John Sikie Tayai	7,054	75.21	▲23.08
PKR	Joshua Jabeng	1,843	19.65	▼23.16
PAS	Clement Bayang	482	5.14	▲5.14
Total valid votes		9,379	100.00	
Total rejected ballots		203		
Unreturned ballots		7		
Turnout		9,589	74.03	▲5.58
Registered electors		12,953		
Majority		5,211	55.56	▲46.40
BN hold		Swing		
Source(s) "Federal Government Gazette - Notice of Contested Election, State Legislative Assembly of the State of Sarawak [P.U. (B) 190/2016]" (PDF). Attorney General's Chambers of Malaysia. 25 April 2016. Archived from the original (PDF) on 12 June 2017. "Senarai Calon yang Disahkan Layak Bertanding Pilihan Raya Dewan Undangan Negeri ke-11". Election Commission of Malaysia. 25 April 2016. Archived from the original on 25 April 2016.

Sarawak state election, 2011: Kakus
Party	Candidate	Votes	%	∆%
BN	John Sikie Tayai	3,366	52.13	▼17.00
PKR	Paul Anyie Raja	2,764	42.81	▲42.81
Love Malaysia Party	Dick @ Laurance Dick Sekalai	186	2.88	▲2.88
Independent	Entali Empin	141	2.18	▲2.18
Total valid votes		6,457	100.00	
Total rejected ballots		105		
Unreturned ballots		12		
Turnout		6,574	68.45	▲10.12
Registered electors		9,604		
Majority		602	9.32	▼43.34
BN hold		Swing		
Source(s) "Federal Government Gazette - Results of Contested Election and Statements of the Poll after the Official Addition of Votes Sarawak [P.U. (B) 245/2011]" (PDF). Attorney General's Chambers of Malaysia. 29 April 2011.

Sarawak state election, 2006: Kakus
Party	Candidate	Votes	%	∆%
BN	John Sikie Tayai	3,739	69.13	▼6.15
SNAP	Charlie @ Chali Lunyong	887	16.40	▲16.40
Independent	Chin Khin Hee	783	14.48	▲14.48
Total valid votes		5,409	100.00	
Total rejected ballots		73		
Unreturned ballots		11		
Turnout		5,493	58.33	▼5.49
Registered electors		9,417		
Majority		2,852	52.73	▲7.25
BN hold		Swing		

Sarawak state election, 2001: Kakus
Party	Candidate	Votes	%	∆%
BN	John Sikie Tayai	4,252	75.28	▲75.28
Independent	Charlie @ Chali Lunyong	1,131	20.02	▲20.02
PKR	Joshua Renang Manai	265	4.70	▲4.70
Total valid votes		5,648	100.00	
Total rejected ballots		97		
Unreturned ballots		0		
Turnout		5,745	63.82	▲63.82
Registered electors		9,002		
Majority		3,121	55.26	▲55.26
BN hold		Swing		

Sarawak state election, 1996: Kakus
Party	Candidate	Votes	%	∆%
On nomination day, John Sikie Tayai won uncontested.
BN	John Sikie Tayai			
Total valid votes				
Total rejected ballots				
Unreturned ballots				
Turnout				
Registered electors		9,033		
Majority				
BN gain from PBDS		Swing		?

Sarawak state election, 1991: Kakus
Party	Candidate	Votes	%
PBDS	John Sikie Tayai	2,996	53.14
BN	Musa Giri	2,274	40.33
NEGARA	Joshua Jabing	296	5.25
Independent	Ungun Bayang	72	1.28
Total valid votes		5,638	100.00
Total rejected ballots		73	
Unreturned ballots		8	
Turnout		5,719	72.22
Registered electors		7,919	
Majority		722	12.81
This was a new constituency created.
