= Juanda Jaya =

Malaysian politician and mufti

Yang Berhormat Dato' Murshid Diraja Datuk Dr. Juanda Jaya PGBK SSP MLA
- جواندا جاي
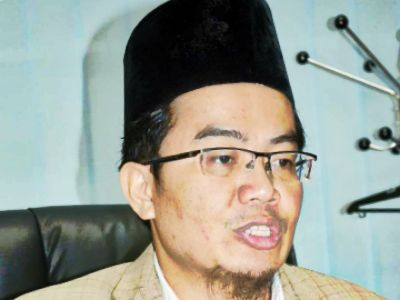

State Deputy Minister in the Premier's Department of Sarawak (Integrity and Ombudsman)
- Incumbent
- Assumed office 4 January 2022
- Governor: Abdul Taib Mahmud (2022–2024); Wan Junaidi Tuanku Jaafar (since 2024)
- Premier: Abang Abdul Rahman Johari
- Minister: John Sikie Tayai
- Preceded by: Talip Zulpilip (Minister in the Premier's Department (Integrity and Ombudsman))
- Constituency: Jemoreng

Member of the Sarawak State Legislative Assembly for Jemoreng
- Incumbent
- Assumed office 7 May 2016
- Preceded by: Abu Seman Jahwie (BN–PBB)
- Majority: 3,789 (2016); 5,012 (2021)

Mufti of Perlis
- In office 27 January 2009 – 27 January 2014
- Preceded by: Mohd Asri Zainul Abidin
- Succeeded by: Mohd Asri Zainul Abidin

Personal details
- Born: 5 September 1972 (age 53) Sibu, Sarawak, Malaysia
- Party: Parti Pesaka Bumiputera Bersatu (PBB)
- Other political affiliations: Barisan Nasional (BN) (–2018); Gabungan Parti Sarawak (GPS) (since 2018)
- Relations: Jaya Mahli (father)
- Occupation: Politician
- Profession: Mufti

Juanda Jaya is a Malaysian politician and mufti who has served as State Deputy Minister in the Premier's Department of Sarawak in charge of Integrity and Ombudsman in the Gabungan Parti Sarawak (GPS) state administration under Premier Abang Abdul Rahman Johari Abang Openg and Minister John Sikie Tayai since January 2022 and Member of the Sarawak State Legislative Assembly (MLA) for Jemoreng since May 2016. He is a member of the Parti Pesaka Bumiputera Bersatu (PBB), a component party of the ruling GPS coalition. He also served as the Mufti of Perlis from January 2009 to January 2014. On 1 October 2009, he started to take leave and was a visiting scholar to Oxford University from 6 October 2009 to 3 August 2010 for 10 months and he is of Melanau descent. He is to date the only East Malaysian to become a Mufti in Peninsular Malaysia.

== Political career ==
Rumors as opposition candidate in the 2013 general election

Perlis PKR Chairman Mohd Faisol Abdul Rahman claimed that Juanda would be the candidate of Parti Keadilan Rakyat (PKR) and Pakatan Rakyat (PR) in the Kangar federal seat in the 2013 general election. However, the claim was strongly refuted by him and he did not contest in the election.

2016 Sarawak state election

In the 2016 Sarawak state election, he was nominated as the BN candidate for the Jemoreng state seat, as the incumbent Jemoreng MLA and then Political Secretary to the Chief Minister of Sarawak, Abu Seman Jahwie wished not to be renominated due to health reason. He was later elected as the new MLA, beating independent candidate Abdullah Saminan and Pakatan Harapan (PH) as well as National Trust Party (AMANAH) candidate Kiprawi Suhaili with 3,789 votes.

2021 Sarawak state election and appointment to the Cabinet of Sarawak as State Deputy Minister

In the 2021 Sarawak state election, he was renominated as GPS candidate to defend and successfully retained his Jemoreng seat, defeating independent candidate Osman Rafaee and PH as well as AMANAH candidate Zainab Suhaili with increased majority of 5,012. On 30 December 2021, Premier of Sarawak Abang Abdul Rahman Johari Abang Openg unveiled his new cabinet lineup, Juanda was then appointed as State Deputy Minister in the Premier's Department in charge of Integrity and Ombudsman on 4 January 2022.

== Election results ==
Sarawak State Legislative Assembly
Year	Constituency	Candidate	Votes	Pct	Opponent(s)	Votes	Pct	Valid votes	Majority	Turnout
2016	N44 Jemoreng	Juanda Jaya (PBB)	5,084	77.43%	Kiprawi Suhaili (AMANAH)	187	2.85%	6,566	3,789	69.40%
2016	N44 Jemoreng	Juanda Jaya (PBB)	5,084	77.43%	Abdullah Saminan (IND)	1,295	19.73%	6,566	3,789	69.40%
2021	N44 Jemoreng	Juanda Jaya (PBB)	5,623	86.80%	Zainab Suhaili (AMANAH)	244	3.77%	6,478	5,012	65.02%
2021	N44 Jemoreng	Juanda Jaya (PBB)	5,623	86.80%	Osman Rafaie (IND)	611	9.43%	6,478	5,012	65.02%

== Honours ==
- Perlis
  - Recipient of the Order for Dato' Titleholders – Dato' Murshid Diraja (2013)
  - Companion of the Order of Prince Syed Sirajuddin Jamalullail of Perlis (SSP) (2005)
- Sarawak
  - Commander of the Order of the Star of Hornbill Sarawak (PGBK) – Datuk (2022)
  - Gold Medal of the Sarawak Independence Diamond Jubilee Medal (2024)
