= Shawkiy Abu Khalil =

Palestinian author and researcher

Shawkiy Abu Khalil شوقي أبو خليل
- Born: 25 May 1941; Beisan, Palestine
- Died: 24 August 2010 (aged 69); Damascus, Syria

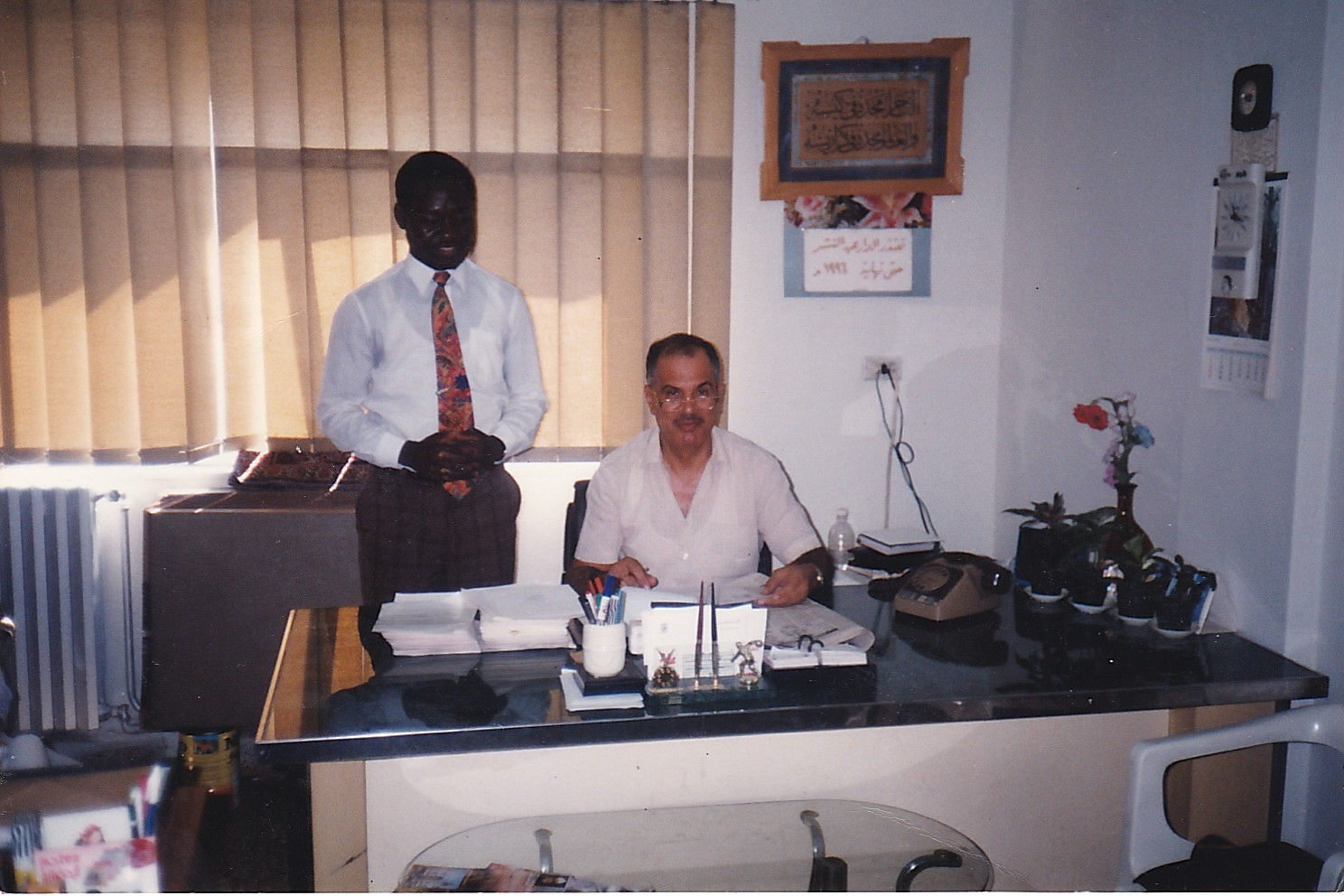
Dr. Adelabu and his PhD Thesis With Abu-Khalil at Baramkeh Campus, Damascus

Shawkiy Abu Khalil (Arabic: شوقي أبو خليل, 1941–2010) was a Syria-based Palestinian author and researcher, who wrote works, most famous of which is his book al-Islam fi Qafass al-'Itiham.

Shawqi Muhammad Abu Khalil was born in City of Beisan in 1941. He completed his university studies at the Faculty of Arts, Department of History at Damascus University in 1965, then went to Azerbaijan to obtain a PhD in History from the Academy of Sciences.

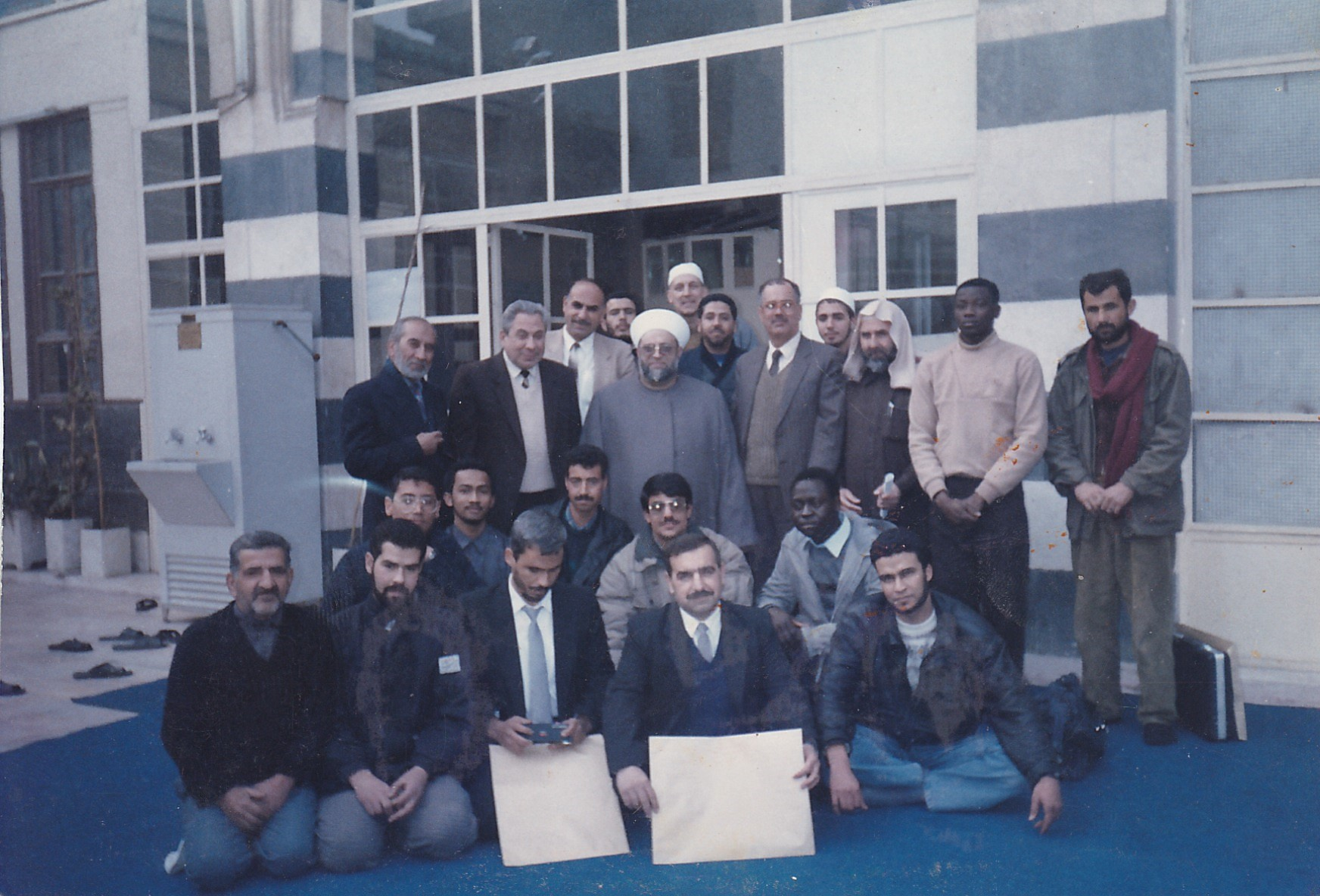
Abu Khalil, forth from right, and Sheikh Dr. Muhammad Abdul-Latif Salih Al-Farfour with International Graduates including Nigerian researcher Dr. Abdul-Fattah Adelabu in Damascus 1993

After his return, he worked as a history teacher in various secondary schools in the Syrian governorates where he taught graduates including the British-Nigerian Muslim scholar Dr. Abdul-Fattah Adelabu, then he rose to administrative positions: Worked as a professor of Islamic civilization and orientalism at the Faculty of Islamic Preaching (Damascus Branch) at the Sheikh Ahmad Kaftaro Complex between (1986–1988). He taught history at the College of Islamic Call and the College of Sharia at Damascus University. Lecturer at the Faculty of Sharia, Damascus University, years (1988–1997).

He was appointed Secretary General of the University of Islamic and Arab Sciences - Damascus (1992–1997).

He was Editor-in-chief at Dar Al-Fikr since 1991 until the date of his death, which was the publishing house from which he released most of his recent books. He was also the head of the History and Civilization Division at the Al-Fateh Islamic Society Institute, and a professor of history there from 2000 up to his death.

He worked as managing editor at Dar Al Fikr in Damascus.

== Published works ==
=== English translations ===
- Dr. Shawqi Abu Khalil (2003). Atlas of the Qur'an. Riyadh: Darussalam. ISBN 9960-897-54-0.
- Dr. Shawqi Abu Khalil (2004). Atlas on the Prophet's Biography. Riyadh: Darussalam. ISBN 9960-897-71-0.
