= John Sikie Tayai =

Malaysian politician

Yang Berhormat Dato Sri Datuk John Sikie Tayai MLA PNBS PJN
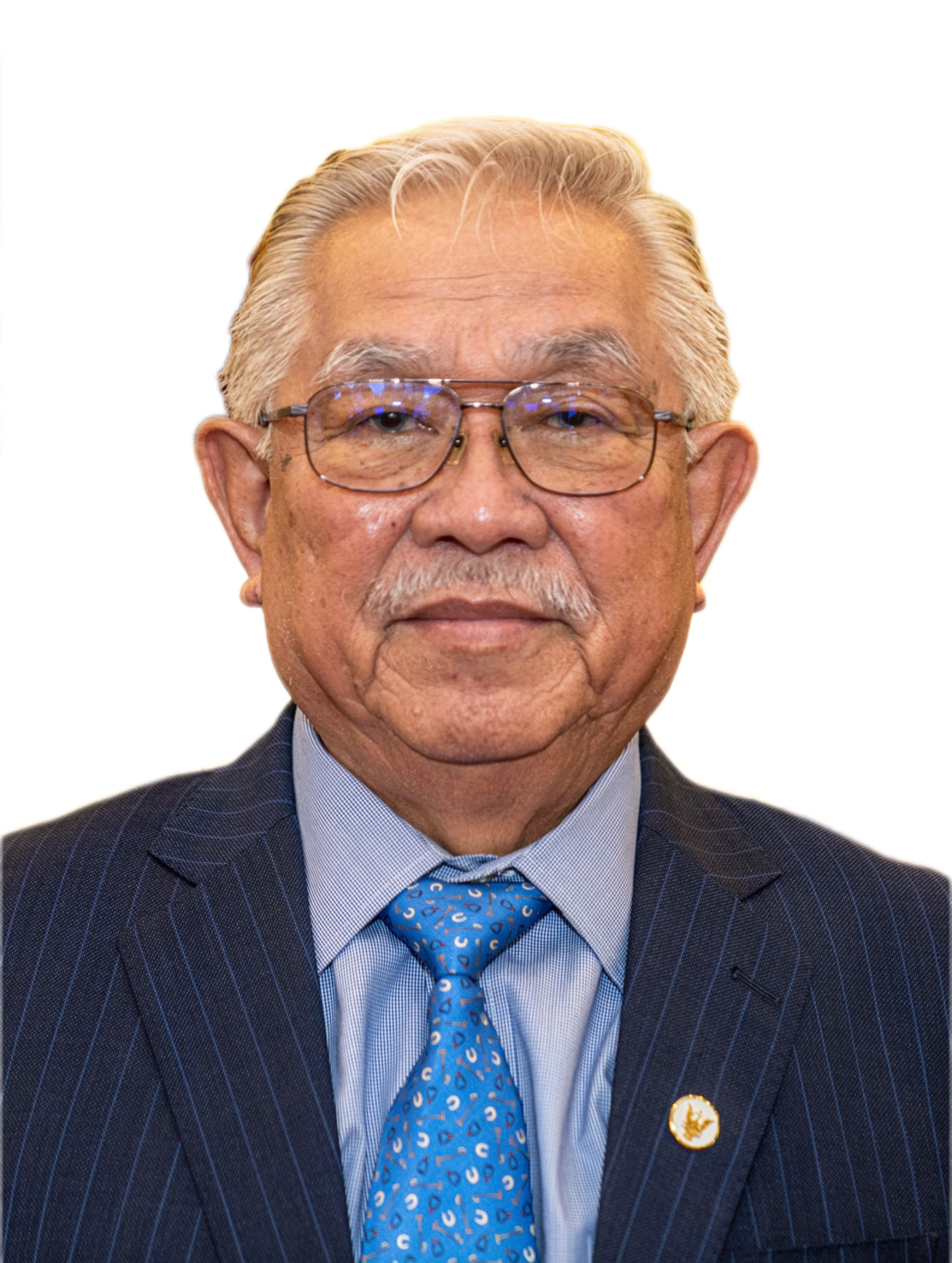

Minister in the Premier's Department
- Incumbent
- Assumed office 2022
- Governor: Abdul Taib Mahmud (2022-2024); Wan Junaidi Tuanku Jaafar (since 2024)
- Deputy: Sharifah Hasidah Sayeed Aman Ghazali; Gerawat Gala; Abdullah Saidol; Juanda Jaya; Jefferson Jamit Unyat; Abdul Rahman Junaidi
- Premier: Abang Johari
- Preceded by: Position established

3rd President of Sarawak Peoples' Party
- Incumbent
- Assumed office 2025
- Preceded by: Joseph Salang Gandum
- Incumbent
- Assumed office 1991

Personal details
- Born: John Sikie anak Tayai Sarawak
- Citizenship: Malaysian
- Party: PBDS (till 2004); PRS (since 2004)
- Other political affiliations: Barisan Nasional (till 2018); Gabungan Parti Sarawak (since 2018)
- Spouse: Melia John
- Occupation: Politician

John Sikie anak Tayai is a Malaysian politician from PRS. He has served as the Member of the Sarawak State Legislative Assembly for Kakus since 1991. He is also a minister in the Premier's Department.

== Political career ==
In 2025, John has defeated Wilson Nyabong Ijang, Member of the Sarawak State Legislative Assembly for Pelagus, to become the President of PRS, replacing Joseph Salang Gandum, who is retiring.

== Election results ==
Sarawak State Legislative Assembly
Year	Constituency	Candidate	Votes	Pct.	Opponent(s)	Votes	Pct.	Ballots cast	Majority	Turnout
1991	N44 Kakus	John Sikie Tayai (PBDS)	2,996	53.14%	Musa Giri (PBB)	2,274	40.33%	5,719	722	72.22%
1991	N44 Kakus	John Sikie Tayai (PBDS)	2,996	53.14%	Joshua Jabing (NEGARA)	296	5.25%	5,719	722	72.22%
1991	N44 Kakus	John Sikie Tayai (PBDS)	2,996	53.14%	Ungun Bayang (IND)	72	1.28%	5,719	722	72.22%
1996	N47 Kakus	John Sikie Tayai (PBDS)	Unopposed							
2001	N47 Kakus	John Sikie Tayai (PBDS)	4,252	75.28%	Charlie @ Chali Lunyong (IND)	1,131	20.02%	5,745	3,121	63.82%
2001	N47 Kakus	John Sikie Tayai (PBDS)	4,252	75.28%	Joshua Renang Manai (PKR)	265	4.70%	5,745	3,121	63.82%
2006	N53 Kakus	John Sikie Tayai (PRS)	3,739	69.13%	Charlie @ Chali Lunyong (SNAP)	887	16.40%	5,493	2,852	58.33%
2006	N53 Kakus	John Sikie Tayai (PRS)	3,739	69.13%	Chin Khin Hee (IND)	783	14.48%	5,493	2,852	58.33%
2011	N53 Kakus	John Sikie Tayai (PRS)	3,366	52.13%	Paul Anyie Raja (PKR)	2,764	42.81%	6,574	602	68.45%
2011	N53 Kakus	John Sikie Tayai (PRS)	3,366	52.13%	Laurance Dick Sekalai (PCM)	186	2.88%	6,574	602	68.45%
2011	N53 Kakus	John Sikie Tayai (PRS)	3,366	52.13%	Entali Empin (IND)	141	2.18%	6,574	602	68.45%
2016	N60 Kakus	John Sikie Tayai (PRS)	7,054	75.21%	Joshua Jabeng (PKR)	1,843	19.65%	9,589	5,211	74.03%
2016	N60 Kakus	John Sikie Tayai (PRS)	7,054	75.21%	Clement Bayang (PAS)	482	5.14%	9,589	5,211	74.03%
2021	N60 Kakus	John Sikie Tayai (PRS)	5,307	52.35%	Peter Tuan (PSB)	3,410	33.64%	10,280	1,897	71.31%
2021	N60 Kakus	John Sikie Tayai (PRS)	5,307	52.35%	Ugik Selipih (IND)	546	5.39%	10,280	1,897	71.31%
2021	N60 Kakus	John Sikie Tayai (PRS)	5,307	52.35%	Joshua Jabeng (PKR)	375	3.70%	10,280	1,897	71.31%
2021	N60 Kakus	John Sikie Tayai (PRS)	5,307	52.35%	Philip Kelanang Diun (PBK)	337	3.32%	10,280	1,897	71.31%
2021	N60 Kakus	John Sikie Tayai (PRS)	5,307	52.35%	Tiun Kanun (IND)	162	1.60%	10,280	1,897	71.31%

== Honours ==
- Malaysia :
  - Commander of the Order of Meritorious Service (PJN) — Datuk (2011)
- Sarawak :
  - Knight Commander of the Most Exalted Order of the Star of Sarawak (PNBS) – Dato Sri (2023)
