= Wahbah al-Zuhayli =

Syrian Islamic scholar (1932 – 2015)

Wahbah Mustafa al-Zuhayli
- Title: Doctor, Professor, Shaykh, Imam

Personal life
- Born: 1932 Dair Atiah, Syria
- Died: 8 August 2015 (aged 82–83)
- Era: 20th century
- Region: Levant
- Main interest(s): Islamic law, Islamic legal philosophy
- Education: Al-Azhar University

Religious life
- Religion: Islam
- Denomination: Sunni
- Jurisprudence: Shafii
- Creed: Ashari

Wahbah Mustafa al-Zuhayli (1932 – 8 August 2015) born in Dair Atiah, Syria was a Syrian professor and Islamic scholar specializing in Islamic law and legal philosophy. He was also a preacher at Badr Mosque in Dair Atiah. He was the author of scores of books on Islamic and secular law, many of which have been translated to English. He was chairman of Islamic jurisprudence in the College of Sharia at Damascus University, and a signatory to the Amman Message and A Common Word documents.

== Biography ==
Zuhayli was born in the Syrian town of Dair Atiah, north of Damascus, to a father who was a farmer by occupation. Zuhayli studied sharia in the University of Damascus for six years, graduating in 1952 at the top of his class. Zuhayli furthered his Islamic education at the prestigious Al-Azhar University where he again graduated at the top of his class in 1956. After graduating in 1956, Zuhayli also received an ijaza in teaching Arabic from Al-Azhar.

While studying in al-Azhar, Zuhayli studied law in Ain Shams University in Cairo, Egypt where he received a bachelor's degree magna cum laude in 1957. In 1959, he received a master's degree in law from Cairo University's College of Law. In 1963, he received his doctorate with honors in law with a major in Islamic sharia, his thesis was "The Influences of War on Islamic Jurisprudence: A comparative study including the eight schools of Islamic law and secular international law."

From 1963 Zuhayli taught at Damascus University where he was professor since 1975. He lectured in both the colleges of sharia and law and he specialized in Islamic law, Islamic legal philosophy, and comparative legal systems. He also taught as a visiting professor at the faculty of law at University of Benghazi in Libya (1972–1974), the faculty of sharia law at the University of the United Arab Emirates (1984–1989), the University of Khartoum, Sudan, and the Islamic University of Riyadh. Dr. Zuhayli also taught the principles of Islamic legal writing and evidence for graduate students in Sudan, Pakistan, and elsewhere. Dr. Zuhayli's erudite understanding of Islamic law caused him to be chosen to design the curriculum of Damascus University's College of Sharia in the late 1960s.

Zuhayli was a member of the Royal Society for Research on Islamic Civilization of the Aal al-Bayt Foundation in Amman Jordan as well as many other worldwide Islamic legal bodies including the Syrian Majis al-Ifta, Islamic Fiqh Academy in Jeddah, Saudi Arabia and the Islamic Fiqh Academies of the United States, India, and Sudan. He was also Chairman of the Research Institute for Islamic Financial Institutions. Many of his books and writings also concern secular legal systems, such as international law or the law of the United Arab Emirates.

Zuhayli also served as an Islamic legal consultant to Islamic financial companies and institutions including the International Islamic Bank. He was also a well known religious preacher in the Islamic world, appearing frequently on television and radio programs; he also frequently appeared in the Arab press. He was an imam and preacher at the Othman Mosque in Damascus and later a summer preacher at the Badr Mosque in Dair Atiah.

Zuhayli died on 9 August 2015

== Zuhayli's edicts ==
Zuhayli was widely regarded as one of the foremost experts on Islamic law and legal theory in the world as well as a public intellectual and popular preacher. In his position on the Syrian Majlis al-Ifta he was responsible for issuing fatwas or religious opinions. Many of Dr. Zuhayli's opinions were seen as very moderate – including his support for what he called Islamic democracy, human rights, and freedom.

== Positions and views on theological/doctrinal matters ==
Zuhayli defended the Ashari and Maturidi schools of belief to be orthodox and defending the option of lay Muslims to follow a madhhab or school of Islamic jurisprudence in their everyday lives. His works on Islamic legal theory establish that traditional Sunni Islamic orthodoxy is defined by that which complies to one of the four valid Sunni madhhab, however he also stated that following one of the four madhhab is not obligatory – what is religiously obligatory is for the layman, defined as one who has not achieved the ability of independent legal reasoning, is to follow a competent valid orthodox Mufti. He stated that "the truth is that the majority of Ahl al-Sunnah were of the opinion that one should follow one of the four madhhab, yet others who disagreed with them, and they are also from Ahl al-Sunnah had a different opinion and proofs and this is a place of recorded debate; it is the duty of the Muslim to obey what the scholars agreed upon (ijma) and this is the majority of legal questions, yet he does not have to obey the opinions of any particular group or sect, and we do not establish a ruling of disbelief nor do we argue with such people due to the fact that each group has their proofs, scholars, and teachers." He stated that the layman has no madhhab and may simply rely on a valid Mufti with a proper ijaza in one of the madhhab to establish legal rulings. He also defends the right of Muslims to follow different madhhab in different legal questions, as long as this is done with certain conditions such as not doing so to follow the easiest position in every school – although looking for an easier position in another school occasionally is allowed under certain conditions.

Zuhayli's position on celebrating Muhammad's birthday or mawlid was that it is permitted and even encouraged as long as it is not believed to be a religious obligation or an act of worship and is free of sin. He has also defended the Qaṣīdah al-Burda poem of Busiri from attacks by some puritanical Muslim groups.

Zuhayli's position Sufism is considered by some as being moderate while by others as being too harsh and even some as being partially Wahhabi influenced. In many ways he was critical of what he saw as heretical innovation (bid'ah) and even in some cases what he considered disbelief (kufr) committed by some Sufi groups which he called "unaccepted" and "blameworthy" such as calling upon pious saints or Muhammad to answer one's prayer – believing such possessed omnipotence or power independent of God, which has caused him to be derided by some as being Wahhabi influenced or at least as a modernist . However, al-Zuhayli has defended the practice of beseeching God through the intercession of the Islamic prophets and saints (tawassul) saying this has been "absolutely permitted by the people of the sunnah, whether in life or after death, by many proofs from our scholars who wrote about it in the books of theology and jurisprudence." He also said that the best litanies are those set down in the Qur'an and hadith. Yet he also said that joining a Sufi order (tariqa) would be "acceptable" if such an order was learned and in complete compliance to the sharia and orthodox Sunni Islamic theology.

In one fatwa, Zuhayli said he saw two types of Sufism:

There are two types of Sufism: praiseworthy Sufism and blameworthy Sufism. The praised is that which is in agreement with the Qur'an and sunnah. It means the healing of the soul and excellence in directing oneself to God as well as connecting with God which cannot happen without litanies based in the Qur'an and the example of the Prophet Muhammad.

The blamed is that which is in excess of this with its formalities and exaggerations such as the drum and the horn – which fall under deviant innovations. This is what (classical) Islamic legal scholars such as al-Qurtubi stated and it is also my position.

With deep regret, drums and horns have entered into our mosques during mawlid ceremonies, and this is what many scholars had called deviant and without sound foundation (in Islamic law), and this is my position. I love the people of Sufism who are moderate, those who are committed to the Qur'an and sunnah; and I hate (the Sufism) of heretical innovations and that which is alien to Islam, this is my methodology.

Zuhayli was partially critical of Wahhabism or Salafism, using both terms to describe the sect in his edicts. Salafis who fall into anthropomorphism due to their literal interpretation of certain verses of the Qur'an are said to be in "manifest error." He also condemned certain groups of Salafis who have advocated violence. Yet he also stated numerous times his dislike for argumentation with Salafis and stated that "the Wahhabis are not disbelievers," although he strongly disagreed with many of their views. In addition, it has been noted that Zuhayli at certain points defended the Wahhabis and supported them and agreed with their positions.

== Islamic international law ==
Zuhayli was one of the world's leading experts on Islamic international law. His works have been quoted in western scholarly works such as Sohail Hashimi's Ethics and Weapons of Mass Destruction: Religious and Secular and Reuven Firestone's Disparity and Resolution in the Qurʾānic Teachings on War: A Reevaluation of a Traditional Problem. In a scholarly article presented in 2005 to the International Committee of the Red Cross entitled Islam and International Law al-Zuhayli argued that the basis between Muslims and non-Muslim countries under Islamic law is one of peace and not war, and that war must be avoided and a last resort to be considered jus ad bellum. Moreover, al-Zuhayli established that combative jihad was only permissible in three specific situations:

1. "aggression against Muslims, either individually or collectively, as preachers for Islam, or attempts to make Muslims apostates or the launching of war against Muslims".
2. "assistance for the victims of injustice, whether individuals or groups".
3. "self-defence and to ward off attacks on one's homeland."

Zuhayli also argued that Islamic law maintains that non-combatants must not be killed during a war and that property damage is prohibited unless it is limited to that which directly relates to military combat. He also argued that war must never be waged to force non-Muslims to convert to Islam or for account of their religion, but only in relation to aggression. He bewailed the thesis of Samuel P. Huntington relating to the clash of civilizations and instead affirmed that the Qur'an praises the diversity of humanity.

== Teachers and students ==
Zuhayli was a teacher for Abu-Abdullah Adelabu.

== Works ==
Zuhayli wrote numerous extremely detailed works mostly about Islamic law and legal theory. In total, Dr. al-Zuhayli wrote over one hundred and sixty books. Among them are:

- Athar al-Harb fi al-Fiqh al-Islami: Dirasa Muqarin ("The Influences of War in Islamic Jurisprudence: A comparative study"). It has been translated into French.
- al-Fiqh al-Islami wa Adilatuhu ("Islamic Jurisprudence and its Proofs") a very long eight-volume summary of the different schools of Islamic jurisprudence and their debates on various legal questions. It has been translated into Turkish, Urdu, Malay, and Farisi and is currently being translated into English.
- Usul al-Fiqh al-Islami ("The Roots of Islamic Jurisprudence") a two-volume treatise on Islamic legal theory and philosophy.
- al-Wajiz fi Usul al-Fiqh ("The Brief Summary in Usul al-Fiqh") a shorter summary of his longer work "Usul al-Fiqh al-Islami"
- al-Fiqh al-Shafi'i al-Muyasir ("Easy Shafi'i Islamic Jurisprudence")
- al-Fiqh al-Islami `ala Madhhab al-Maliki ("Islamic Jurisprudence according to the Maliki madhhab")
- Financial Transactions in Islamic Jurisprudence, a detailed two volume treatise on modern Islamic business law.
- al-'Alaqat al-Dawali fi al-Islam ("International Relations in Islam"), a detailed treatise on Islamic international law.
- al-Huquq al-Insan fi al-Fiqh al-Islami bi al-Ishtirak ma` al-Akhireen ("Human Rights in Islamic Jurisprudence concerning dealings with others")
- al-Islam Din Shura wa Dimuqratiyah ("Islam: A Religion of Consultation and Democracy")
- Haqq al-Huriyah fi al-'Alam ("The Right to Freedom in the World")
- Asl Muqaranit al-Adyan ("The Foundations of Comparative Religions) which has been translated into English
- Al-`Uqud al-Musama fi al-Qanun al-Mu`amilat al-Madani al-Emirati ("Named Contracts in the Civil Law of the United Arab Emirates")
- Tafsir al-Muneer ("The Enlightened Exegesis") an exegesis of the Qur'an which is 17 volumes long.
