= Md. Salleh Yaapar =

Malaysian scholar of comparative literature

Md. Salleh Yaapar (born December 20, 1946) is a Malaysian scholar of comparative literature and a professor of the School of Humanities at the University Sains Malaysia. He is the head of the Institute of Language and Literature of Malaysia and the holder of the European Chair of the Malay studies at Leiden University in Leiden, Netherlands. A recipient of the honorary title of Dato' Seri by the state, he is also a Distinguished fellow of the International Institute of Islamic Civilization and Malay World.

== Biography ==
He holds a Bachelor of Arts degree from Universiti Sains Malaysia and a Master of Arts degree from the University of the Philippines. He received his PhD from Temple University, Philadelphia. Salleh has taught at a number of academic institutions at home and abroad including University Sains Malaysia and Leiden University in Leiden, Netherlands. He has served as the head of the Institute of Language and Literature of Malaysia, the government body in charge of coordinating the use of the Malay language and the Malay language literature in Malaysia.

== Works ==
Books

- (1995) Mysticism and Poetry: A Hermeneutical Reading of the Poems of Amir Hamzah. Kuala Lumpur: Dewan Bahasa dan Pustaka.
- (2009) Pilgrimage to the Orient. Translated by Lalita Sinha. Kuala Lumpur: Institut Terjemahan Negara Malaysia. (From Md. Salleh Yaapar, Ziarah ke Timur, winner of Malaysia Grand Literary Award, 2004).

Festschrifts

- Rainbows of Malay Literature and Beyond: Festschrift in Honour of Professor Md. Salleh Yaapar (2011)
