= Kuching =

Capital and largest city of Sarawak, Malaysia

- State capital city and district capital
- City of Kuching Bandaraya Kuching (Malay)
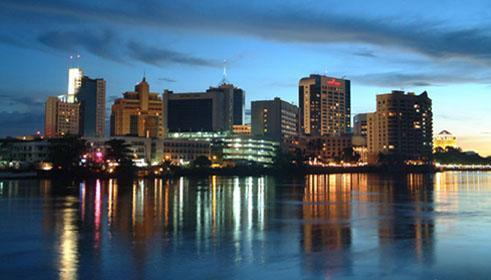
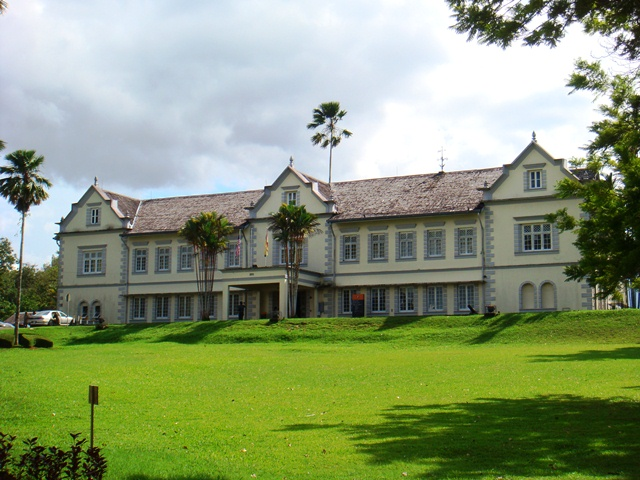
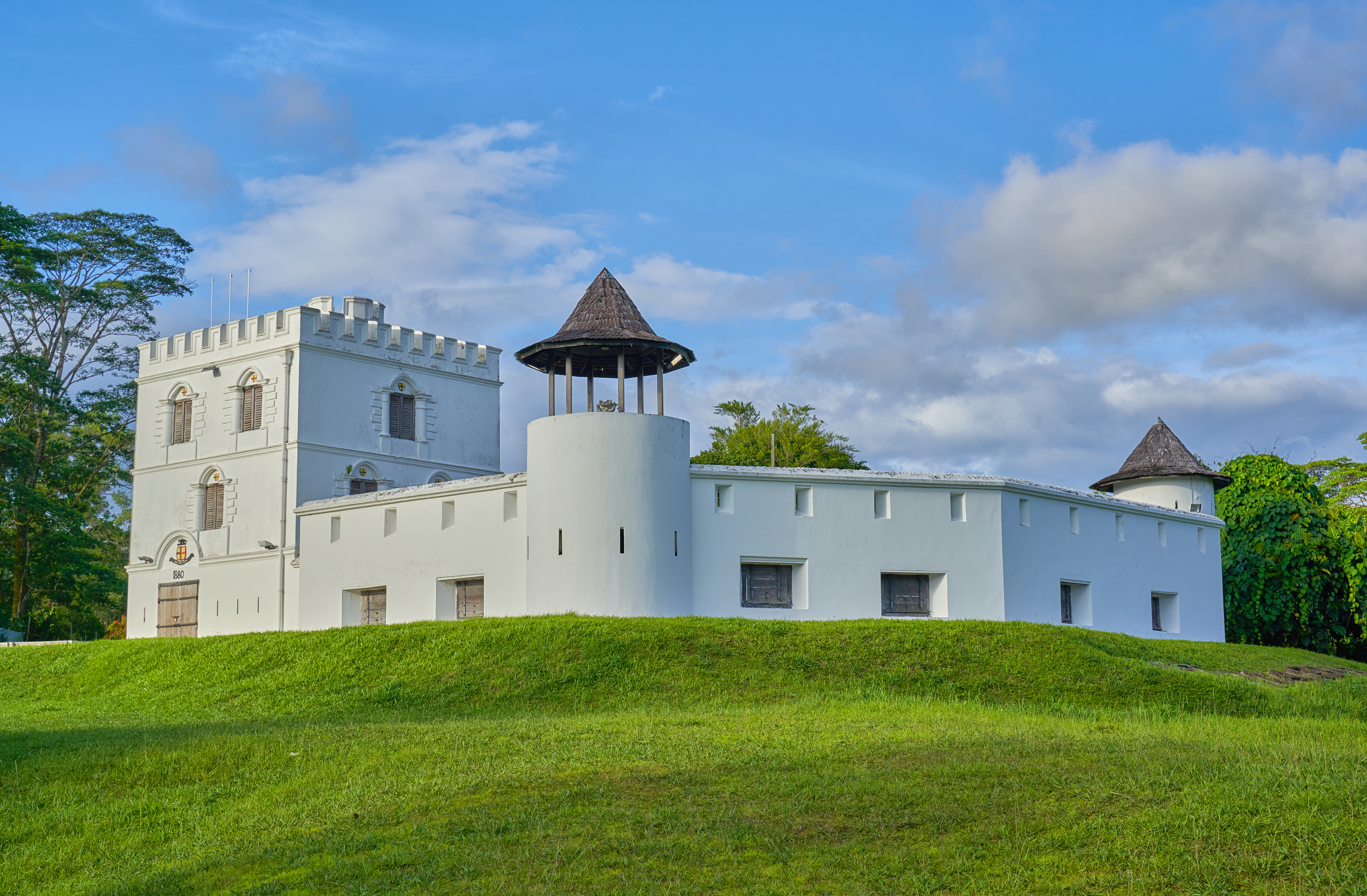
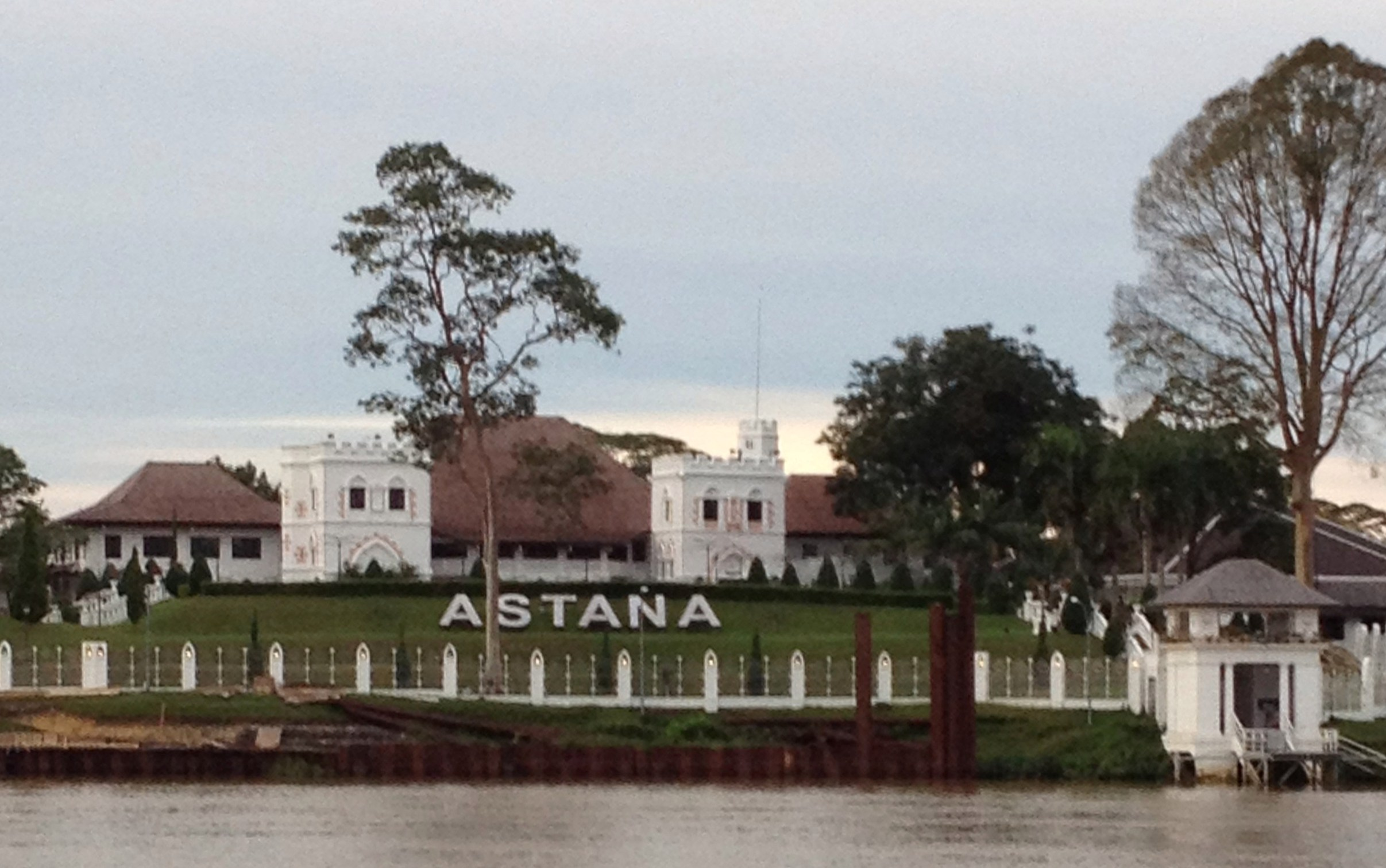
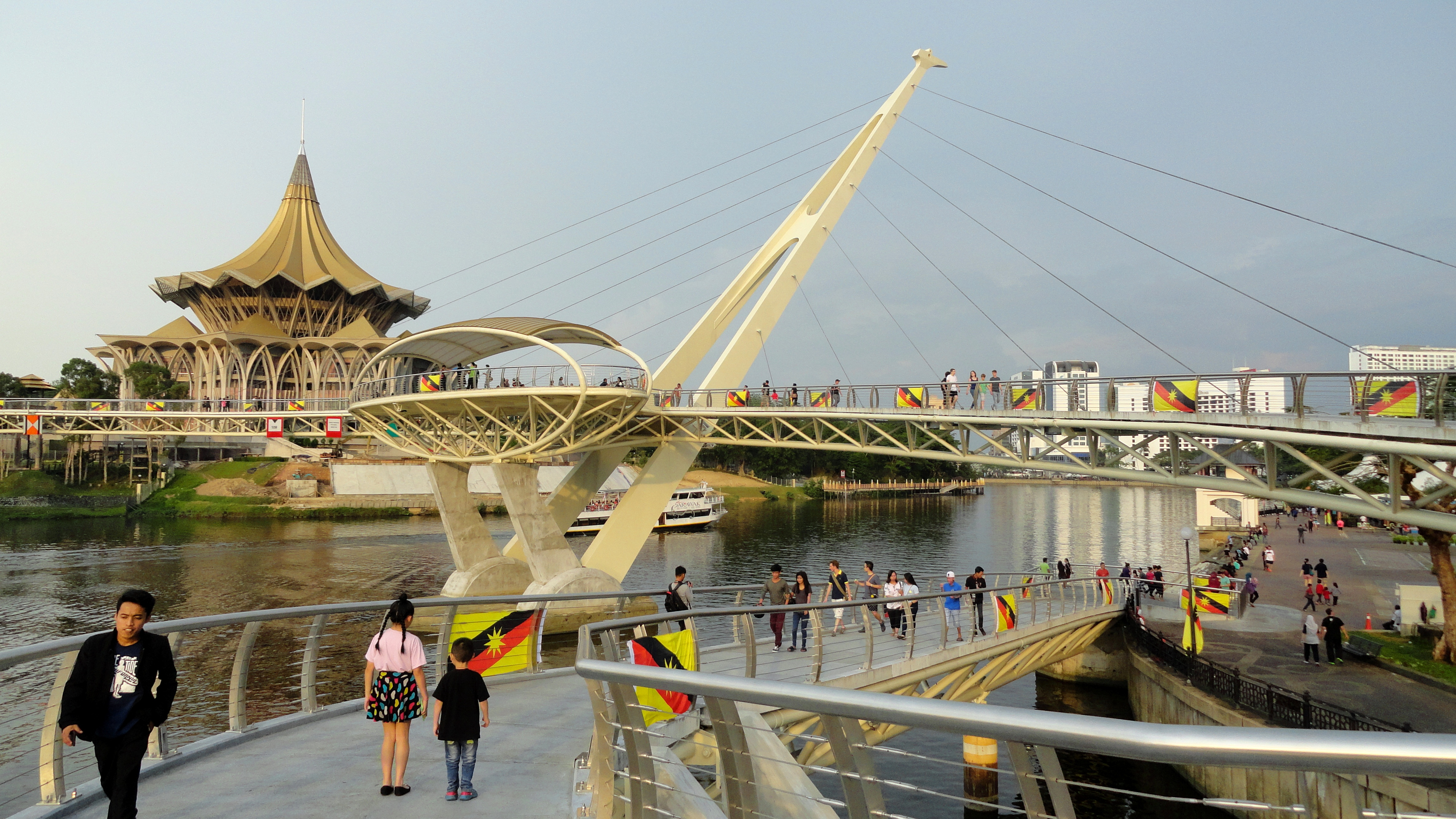
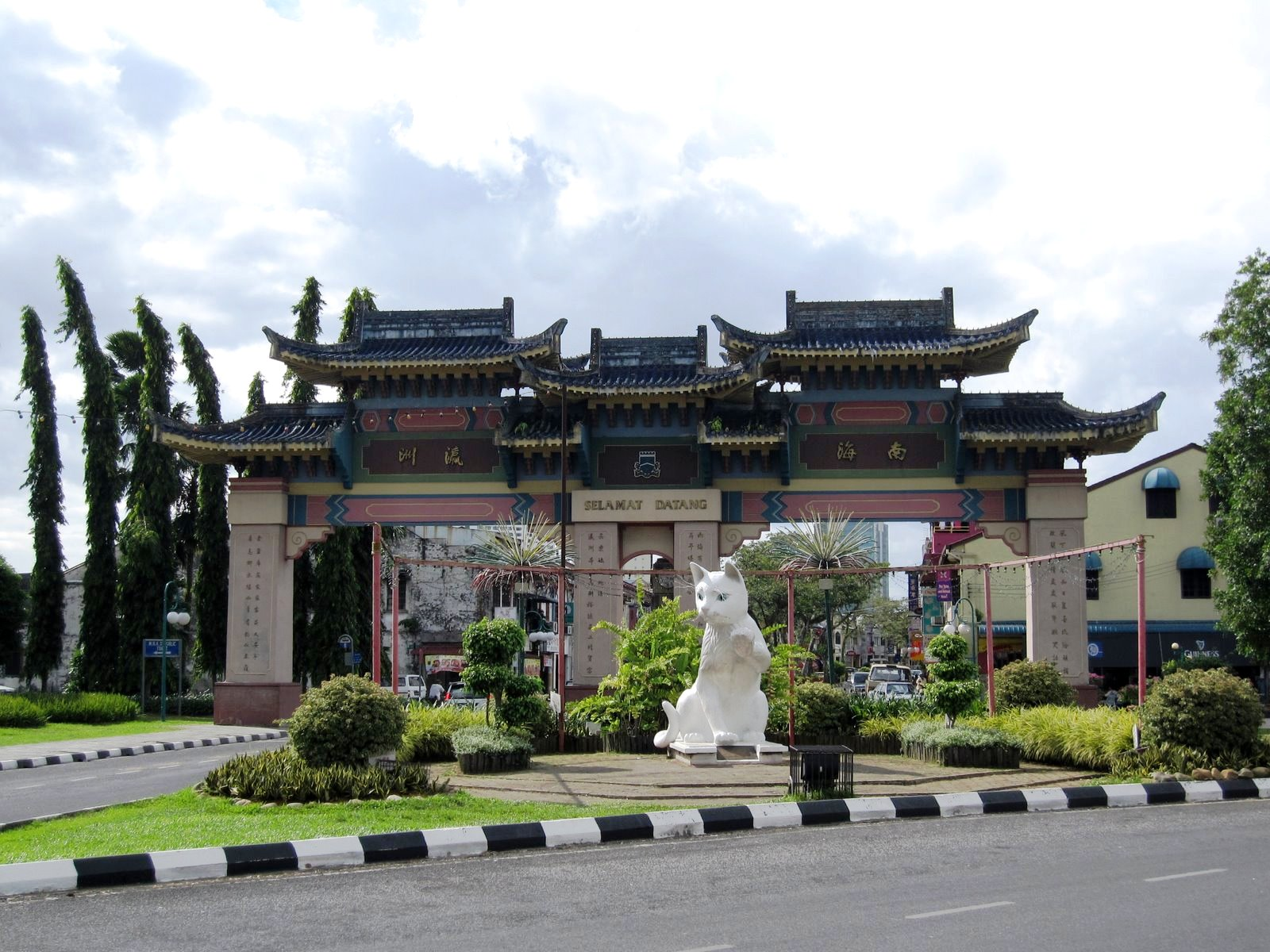
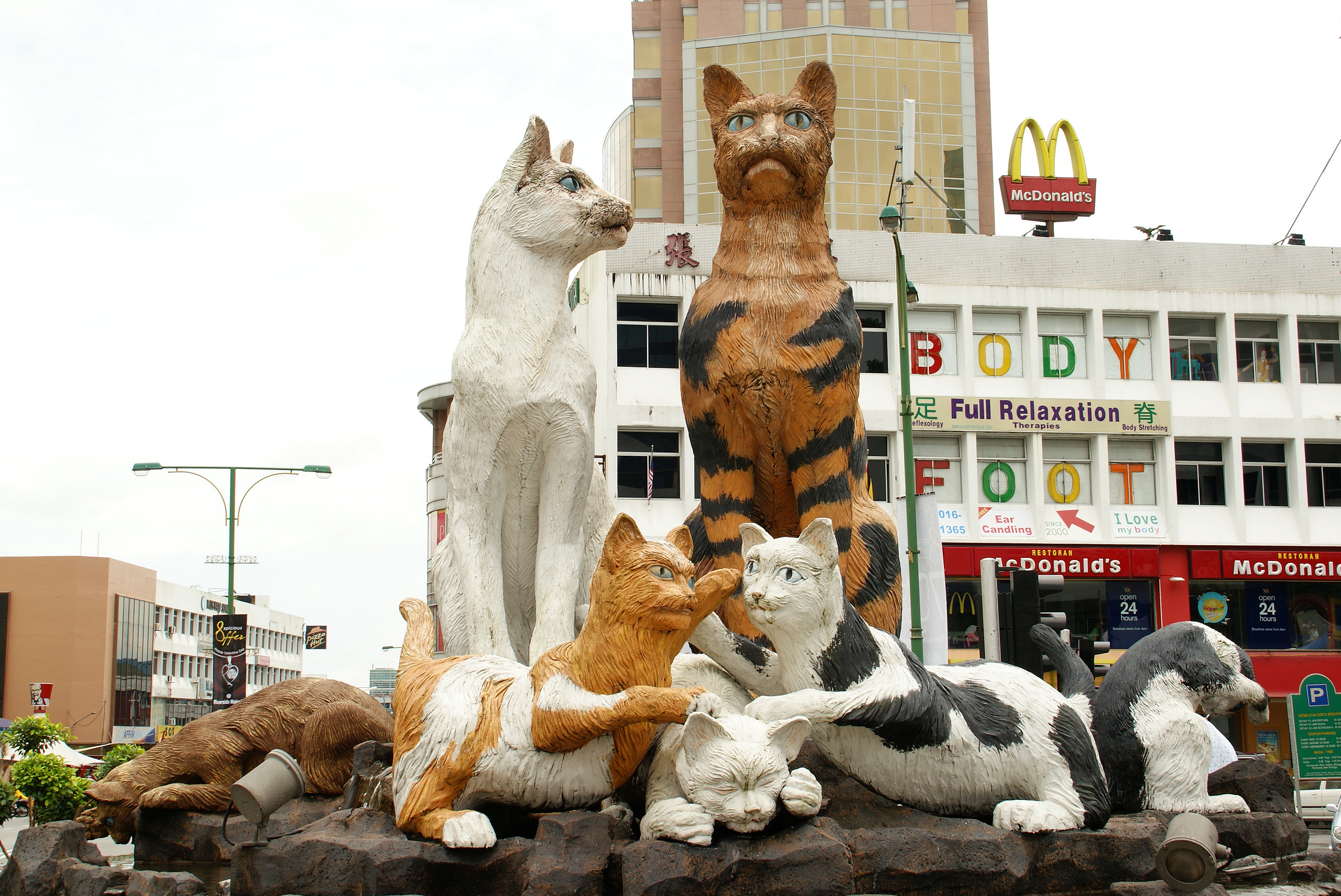
- From top, left to right: Kuching skyline from Sarawak River, the Sarawak State Museum, Fort Margherita, The Astana, the Darul Hana Bridge near State Assembly building, Chinatown, and iconic cat statues.

- Commission of the City of Kuching North Council of the City of Kuching South
- Nicknames: "Cat City", Bandaraya Perpaduan (City of Unity)
- Mottoes: Untuk Masyarakat Berbudaya (Malay) "For a cultured society" (motto of Kuching North City Hall); Berkhidmat Untuk Masyarakat (Malay) "Service for the society" (motto of Kuching South City Council)
- Interactive map of Kuching
- Location within Sarawak Location within Malaysia Location within Southeast Asia Location within Asia
- Coordinates: 01°33′27″N 110°20′38″E
- Country: Malaysia
- State: Sarawak
- Division: Kuching
- District: Kuching
- Founded by the Sultanate of Brunei: 1827
- Settled by James Brooke: 18 August 1842
- Municipality status: 1 January 1953
- City status: 1 August 1988

Government
  - Type: City council
  - Body: Commission of Kuching North City Hall; Council of the City of Kuching South
  - Mayor of Kuching North: Hilmy Othman
  - Mayor of Kuching South: Wee Hong Seng

Area
  - City of Kuching: 450.02 km^{2} (173.75 sq mi)
  - Metro: 2,770.90 km^{2} (1,069.85 sq mi)
  - Kuching North: 378.20 km^{2} (146.02 sq mi)
  - Kuching South: 71.82 km^{2} (27.73 sq mi)
- Elevation: 8 m (26 ft)
- Highest elevation: 810.2 m (2,658 ft)
- Lowest elevation: 0 m (0 ft)

Population (2025)
  - City of Kuching: 514,658
  - Density: 754.33/km^{2} (1,953.7/sq mi)
  - Metro: 788,946
  - Metro density: 336.8/km^{2} (872/sq mi)
  - Demonym: Kuchingite / Orang Kuching
- (Sourced from Department of Statistics Malaysia (DoSM), 2022)
- Time zone: UTC+8 (MST)
  - Summer (DST): UTC+8 (Not observed)
- Postal code: 93xxx
- Area code(s): 082 (landline only)
- Vehicle registration: QA and QK (for all vehicles except taxis); HQ (for taxis only)
- Website: Kuching North: dbku.sarawak.gov.my Kuching South: mbks.sarawak.gov.my

Kuching (/ˈkuːtʃɪŋ/ KOO-ching, Malay pronunciation: [ˈkut͡ʃiŋ]), officially the City of Kuching, is the capital and the most populous city in the state of Sarawak in Malaysia. It is also the capital of Kuching Division. The city is on the Sarawak River at the southwestern tip of Sarawak on the island of Borneo and covers an area of 431 km^{2} (166 sq mi) with a population of about 162,843 in the Kuching North administrative region and 351,815 in the Kuching South administrative region—a total of 514,658 people.

Kuching was founded by the representative of the Sultan of Brunei in 1827. It was the third capital of Sarawak in 1827 during the administration of the Bruneian Empire. In 1841, Kuching became the capital of the Kingdom of Sarawak after the territory in the area was ceded to James Brooke for helping the Bruneian Empire in crushing a rebellion particularly by the interior Borneo-dwelling Land Dayak people who later became his loyal followers after most of them were pardoned by him and joined his side. The town continued to receive attention and development during the rule of Charles Brooke such as the construction of a sanitation system, hospital, prison, fort, and a bazaar. In 1941, the Brooke administration had a Centenary Celebration in Kuching. During World War II, Kuching was occupied by Japanese forces from 1942 to 1945. The Japanese government set up a Batu Lintang camp near Kuching to hold prisoners of war and civilian internees. After the war, the town survived intact. However, the last Rajah of Sarawak, Sir Charles Vyner Brooke decided to cede Sarawak to the British government as part of British Crown Colony in 1946. Kuching remained as capital during the Crown Colony period. After the formation of Malaysia in 1963, Kuching retained its status as state capital and was granted city status in 1988. Since then, Kuching has been divided into two administrative regions managed by two separate local authorities. The administrative centre of the Sarawak Government is officially located at Satria Pertiwi Complex (Kompleks Satria Pertiwi), Petra Jaya, Kuching.

Kuching is a major food destination and is a member of UNESCO's Creative Cities Network under the field of gastronomy. Kuching is also the main gateway for travellers visiting Sarawak and Borneo. Kuching Wetlands National Park is located about 30 km (19 mi) from the city and there are many other tourist attractions in and around Kuching such as Bako National Park, Semenggoh Wildlife Centre, Rainforest World Music Festival (RWMF), state assembly building, The Astana, Fort Margherita, Kuching Cat Museum, and Sarawak State Museum / Borneo Cultures Museum. The city has become one of the major industrial and commercial centres in East Malaysia.

== Etymology ==
The name "Kuching" was already in use for the city by the time Brooke arrived in 1839. There are many theories as to the derivation of the name "Kuching". It was perhaps derived from the Malay word for cat, "kucing", or from Cochin, an Indian trading port on the Malabar Coast and a generic term in China and British India for trading harbour. Some Hindu artefacts can be seen today at the Sarawak State Museum. However, another source reported that Kuching was previously known as "Sarawak" before Brooke arrived. The settlement was renamed to "Sarawak Proper" during the kingdom's expansion. It was only in 1872 that Charles Brooke renamed the settlement to "Kuching".

There was one unlikely theory based on a story of miscommunication. According to the story, James Brooke arrived in Kuching on his schooner Royalist. He then asked his local guide about the name of the town. The local guide mistakenly thought that Brooke was pointing towards a cat, and so had said the word "Kuching". However, ethnic Malays in Sarawak have always used the term "pusak" for cats (cognate with Filipino pusa), instead of the standard Malay word "kucing". Despite this etymological discrepancy, Sarawakians have adopted the animal as a symbol of their city, and it features in statues as well as the municipal council's coat of arms - an example of heraldic canting.

Some source also stated that it was derived from a fruit called "mata kucing" (Euphoria malaiense), a close relative of the Longan that grows widely in Malaysia and Indonesia. There was also a hill in the city that was named after the fruit, which is called Bukit Mata Kuching. Harriette McDougall writing to her son in the 19th century, stated that the name was derived from a stream of the same name, called "Sungai Kuching" or Cat River in English. On page 64 of Bampfylde and Baring-Gould's 1909 'A History of Sarawak under its Two White Rajahs', it says: "Kuching, the capital of Sarawak, is so called from a small stream that runs through the town into the main river...." The stream was situated at the foot of Bukit Mata Kuching and in front of the Tua Pek Kong Temple. In the 1950s, the river became very shallow because of silt deposits in the river. The river was later filled to make way for roads.

There is another theory that Kuching actually means "Ku" (古)- Old and "Ching" (井) - Well or "old well" (古井) in Chinese. During the Brooke administration, there was no water supply and water-borne diseases were common. In 1888, an epidemic broke out which later was known as "Great Cholera Epidemic". A well situated in the present day China Street in Main Bazaar helped to combat the disease by providing clean water supply. Due to increased demand for a water supply, the role of the well was later replaced by water treatment plant on the Bau Road.

== History ==
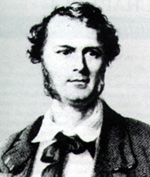
Kuching was later established as the seat of Brooke government under the management of James Brooke.

Sarawak was part of the Bruneian Empire since the reign of the first Sultan of Brunei, Sultan Muhammad Shah. Kuching was the third capital of Sarawak, founded in 1827 by the representative of the Sultan of Brunei, Pengiran Indera Mahkota. Prior to the founding of Kuching, the two past capitals of Sarawak were Santubong, founded by Sultan Pengiran Tengah in 1599, and Lidah Tanah, founded by Datu Patinggi Ali in the early 1820s. The founding of Kuching was spurred by the discovery of antimony ore at the upper Sarawak river in 1824, which was in high demand in the market of nearby Singapore. A Dutch report mentioned that there lived about a hundred Malays and three houses of Chinese in the area shortly before the founding of Kuching. The arrival of Mahkota was not popular with the local Malay chiefs, whose autonomy was restricted by Mahkota's increasing tax and labour demands. The chiefs moved upriver, allied with Dayaks, and rebelled against Brunei. Neither side could gain an edge over the other until 1840 when Pengiran Raja Muda Hashim, the Bruneian Prime Minister, offered to hand over the governorship of Sarawak to British adventurer James Brooke to acquire his help to defeat the rebel chiefs.

Pengiran Raja Muda Hashim later ceded the territory to James Brooke as a reward for helping him to counter the rebellion. The rebellion was crushed in November 1840, and on 24 September 1841, Brooke was appointed as the Governor of Sarawak with the title of Rajah. It was not announced until 18 August 1842, following Sultan Omar Ali Saifuddin II's ratifying the governorship, and requiring Brooke to pay an annual sum of $2,500 to the Sultan. Since that time, Kuching became the seat of the Brooke government.

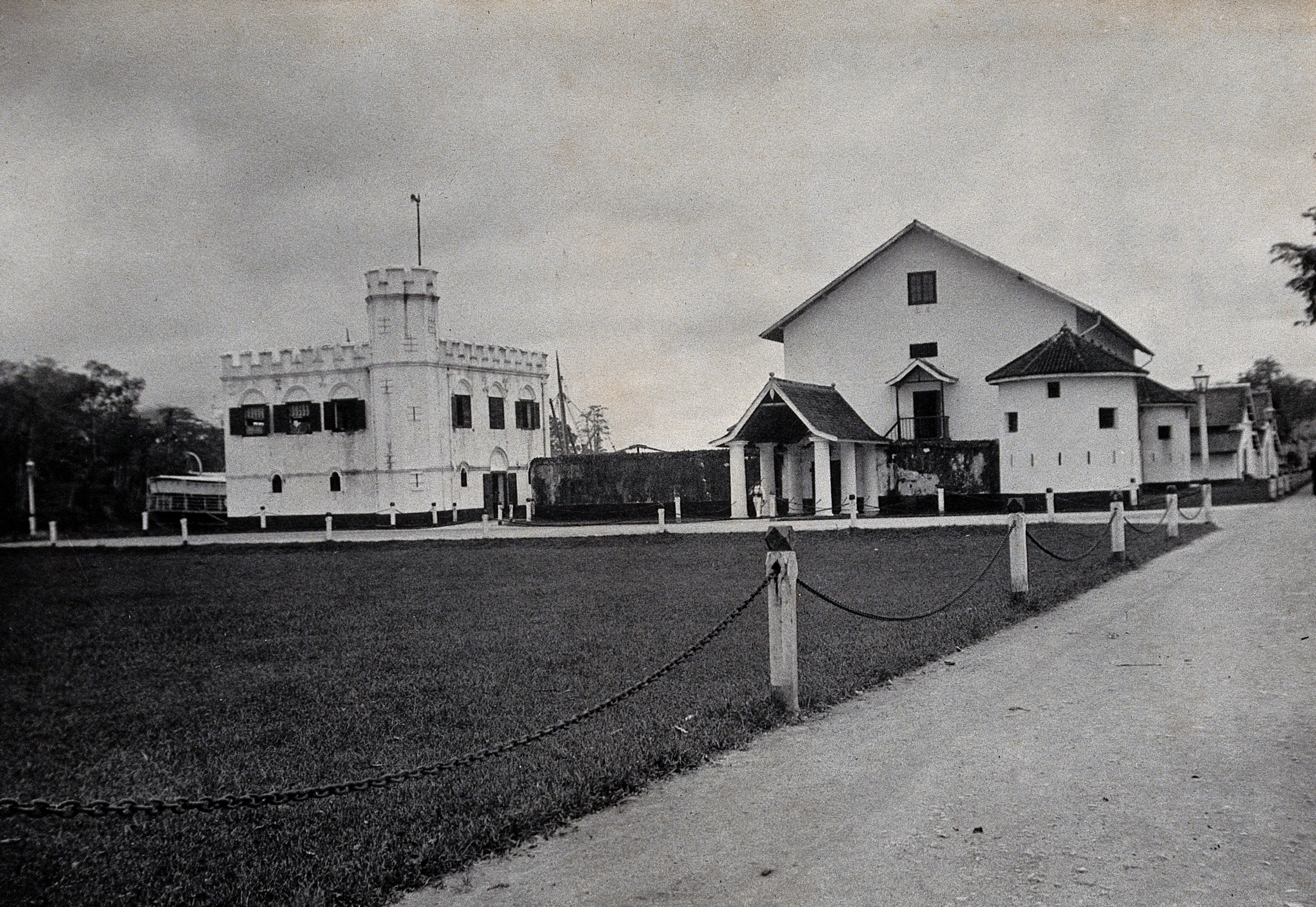
The Kuching state prison was situated beside the Square Tower building in 1896.

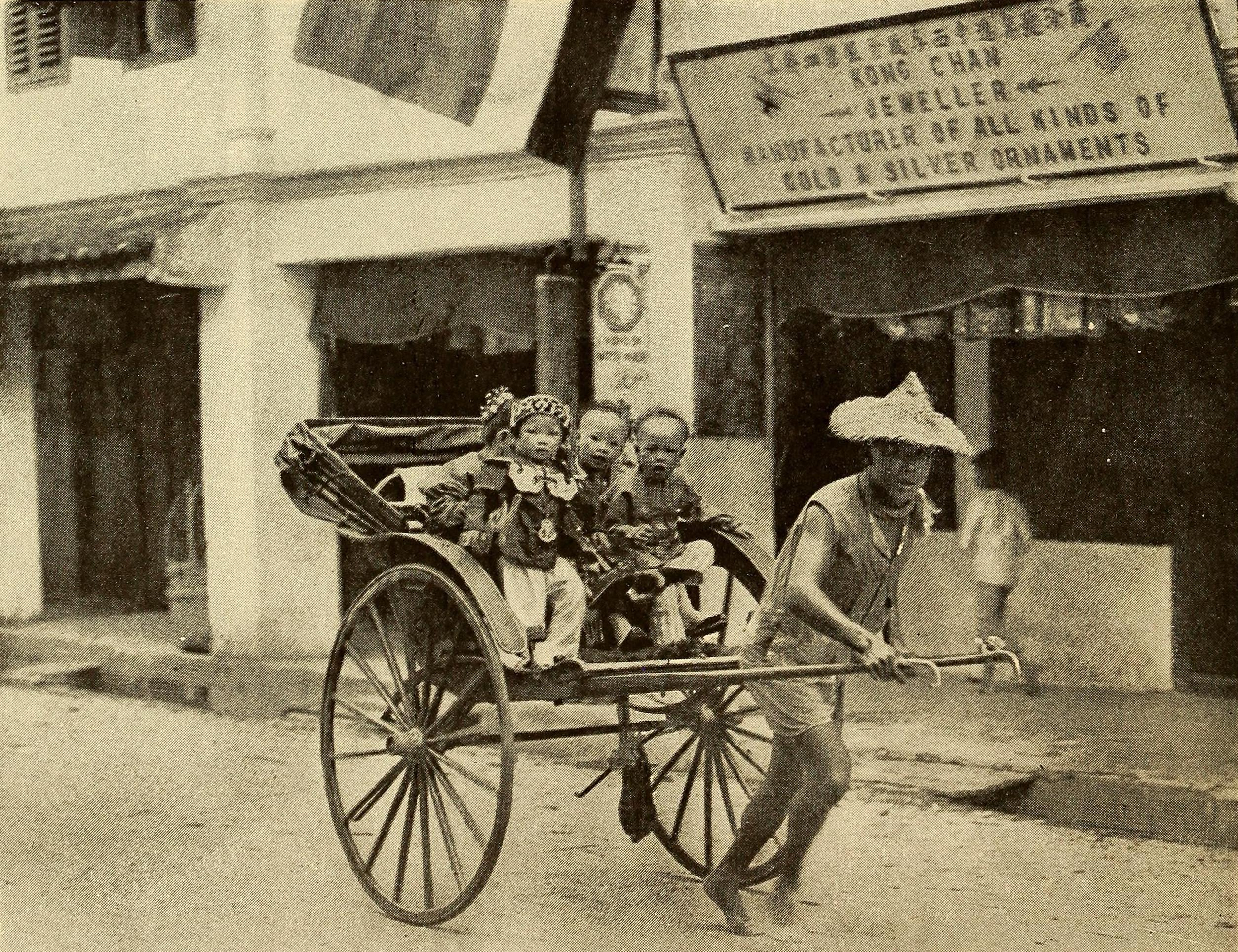
Children are pulled through the city's streets by a coolie, c. 1919.

The administration was later continued by his nephew, Charles Brooke. As an administrative capital, it became the centre of attention and development. Improvements included a sanitation system. By 1874, the city had completed several developments, including construction of a hospital, prison, Fort Margherita, and many other buildings.

Charles Brooke's wife, in her memoir (My Life in Sarawak), included this description of Kuching:

The little town looked so neat and fresh and prosperous under the careful jurisdiction of the Rajah and his officers, that it reminded me of a box of painted toys kept scrupulously clean by a child. The Bazaar runs for some distance along the banks of river, and this quarter of the town is inhabited almost entirely by Chinese traders, with the exception of one or two Hindoo shops....Groceries of exotic kinds are laid out on tables near the pavement, from which the purchasers make their choice. At the Hindoo shops you can buy silks from India, sarongs from Java, tea from China and tiles and porcelain from all parts of the world, laid out in picturesque confusion, and overflowing into the street.

— Margaret Brooke, wife of Charles Brooke.

The Astana (Palace), which is now the official residence of the governor of Sarawak, was constructed next to Brooke's first residence. He had it built in 1869 as a wedding gift to his wife. Kuching continued to prosper under Charles Vyner Brooke, who succeeded his father as the Third Rajah of Sarawak. In 1941, Kuching was the site of the Brooke Government Centenary Celebration. A few months later, the Brooke administration came to a close when the Japanese occupied Sarawak.

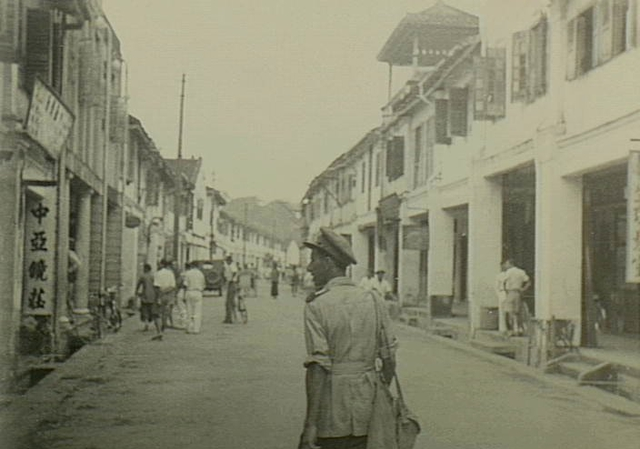
A street scene of Kuching town shortly after the surrender of Japan, image taken on 12 September 1945.

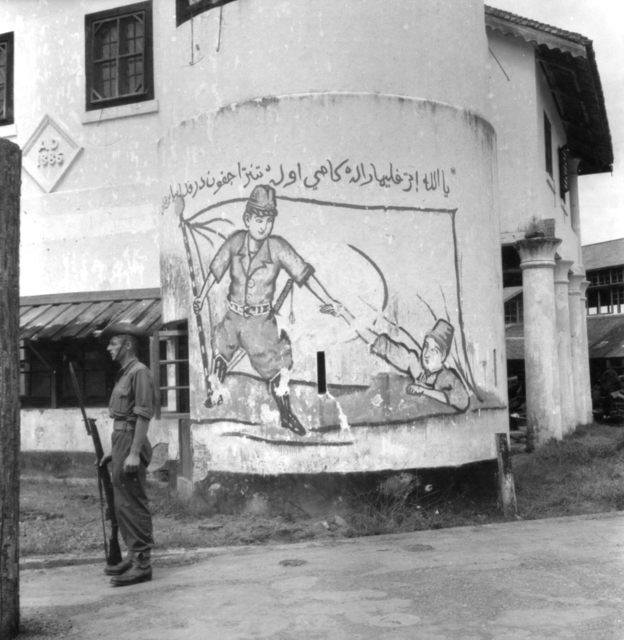
A piece of Japanese propaganda in Jawi script in the town in September 1945, after the Australian forces liberated the town.

During the Second World War, six platoons of infantry from 2/15 Punjab Regiment were stationed at Kuching in April 1941. The Regiment defended Kuching and Bukit Stabar airfield from being the destroyed by the Japanese. Defence was mainly concentrated on Kuching and Miri. However, on 24 December 1941, Kuching was conquered by the Japanese forces. Sarawak was ruled as part of the Japanese Empire for three years and eight months, until the official Japanese surrender on 11 September 1945. The official surrender was signed on HMAS Kapunda at Kuching. From March 1942, the Japanese operated the Batu Lintang camp, for POWs and civilian internees, 5 km (3.1 mi) outside Kuching.

After the end of World War II, the town survived and was wholly undamaged. The third and last Rajah, Sir Charles Vyner Brooke later ceded Sarawak to the British Crown on 1 July 1946. During the Crown Colony period, the government worked to develop and improve the infrastructure on Sarawak. Kuching was revitalised as the capital of Sarawak under the British colonial government. When Sarawak, together with North Borneo, Singapore and the Federation of Malaya, formed the Federation of Malaysia in 1963, Kuching kept its status as the state capital and was granted a city status on 1 August 1988. Kuching experienced further development throughout the years as the state capital. On 29 July 2015, Kuching was declared as "City of Unity" by One Malaysia Foundation for racial harmony that existed in the city because of cross-racial marriages, multi-racial schools, fair scholarship distributions, and balanced workforce patterns.

== Governance ==
Local authorities comprising Greater Kuching with a total area of 2030.94 square kilometres: Kuching North City Hall (DBKU) Kuching South City Council (MBKS) Padawan Municipal Council (MPP) Kota Samarahan Municipal Council (MPKS, formerly MDS)

As the capital of Sarawak, Kuching plays an important role in the political and economic welfare of the population of the entire state as it is the seat of the state government where almost all of their ministries and agencies are based. The Sarawak State Legislative Assembly is located in a suburb, Petra Jaya.

There are 5 Members of Parliament (MPs) representing the five parliamentary constituencies and twelve state legislative assemblymen in the state legislature representing the twelve state constituencies in Kuching district.

Parliamentary Constituencies	State Constituencies
P.193 Santubong	N.3 Tanjung Datu (within Lundu district), N.4 Pantai Damai, N.5 Demak Laut
P.194 Petra Jaya	N.6 Tupong, N.7 Samariang, N.8 Satok
P.195 Bandar Kuching	N.9 Padungan, N.10 Pending, N.11 Batu Lintang
P.196 Stampin	N.12 Kota Sentosa, N.13 Batu Kitang, N.14 Batu Kawah
P.198 Puncak Borneo	N.18 Serembu (within Bau district), N.19 Mambong, N.20 Tarat (within Serian Division)

=== Local authority and city definition ===
Kuching is the only city in Malaysia to be administered by two mayors; the city is divided into Kuching North and Kuching South. Each of these is administered by a mayor for Kuching South and a commissioner for Kuching North. The current commissioner for Kuching North is Datu Junaidi Reduan, who took over from Datuk Haji Abang Abdul Wahab Abang Julai on 31 August 2019 while Datuk Wee Hong Seng became the new mayor for the Kuching South in 2019, succeeding Dato' James Chan Khay Syn. The city obtained a city status on 1 August 1988, and since that it was administered by Kuching North City Hall (DBKU) and Kuching South City Council (MBKS).

The city is defined within the borders of what is the Kuching District. With an area of 1,868.83 km^{2} (721.56 mi^{2}), it is the most populous district in Sarawak. The area then subdivided into two sub-districts, namely Kuching Proper and Padawan. Kuching Proper included the city area and northern part of Padawan municipality (e.g. Batu Kawah, Matang Jaya), while Padawan (Note: Not to be confused with Padawan municipality.) sub-district (southern part of Padawan municipality) included Kota Padawan, Teng Bukap and Borneo Highlands (Mambong). The combined area of Kuching North City Hall, Kuching South City Council, Padawan Municipal Council, and the Kota Samarahan Municipal Council is known as Greater Kuching.

== Geography ==
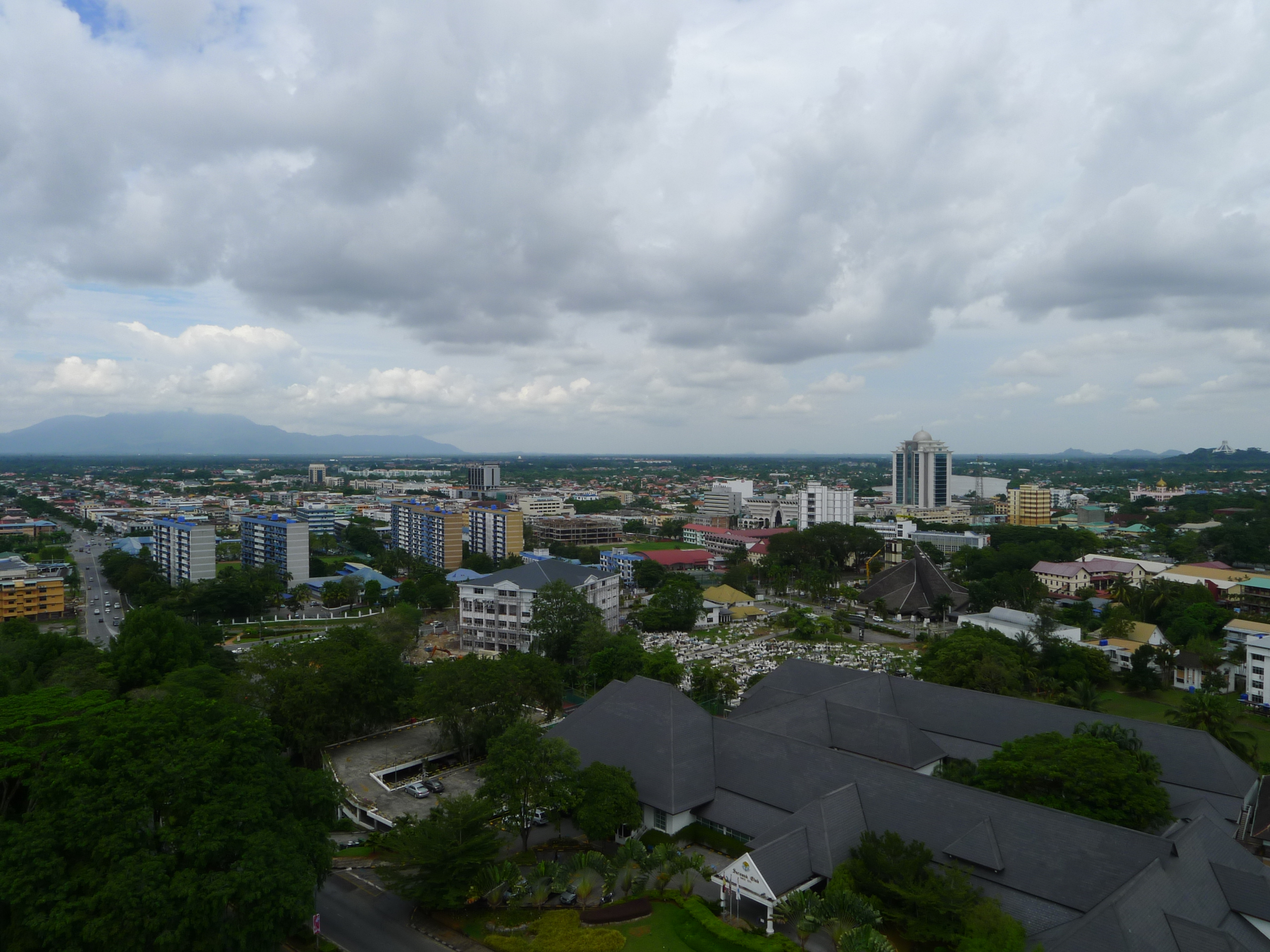
Panorama of Kuching City.

Kuching is located on the banks of the Sarawak River in the northwestern part of the island of Borneo. The limits of the City of Kuching include all that area in Kuching District containing an area approximately 431.01 km^{2} (166.41 mi^{2}) bounded from Gunung Lasak (Mount Lasak) in Muara Tebas to Batu Buaya (Crocodile Rock) in the Santubong peninsula following a series of survey marks as stated in the First Schedule of the City of Kuching Ordinance, 1988. As a simplification of the legal statute, the Kuching city limits extend from the Kuching International Airport in the south to the northern coast of the Santubong and Bako peninsulas; from the Kuching Wetlands National Park in the west to the Kuap River estuary in the east. The Sarawak River generally splits the city into North and South. The highest point in the city is Mount Santubong on the Santubong peninsula, which is at 810.2 m (2,658 ft) above sea level, located 35 km north of the city centre. Rapid urbanisation has occurred in Greater Kuching and the urban sprawl extends to Penrissen, Kota Sentosa, Kota Padawan, Batu Kawah, Matang, Samariang, Siburan, Tarat, Kota Samarahan, Asajaya as well as Serian which is located about 65 km from Kuching.

=== Climate ===
Kuching has a tropical rainforest climate (Köppen climate classification Af), moderately hot but very humid at times and receives substantial rainfall. The average annual rainfall is approximately 4,200 mm (170 in). Kuching is the wettest populated area (on average) in Malaysia with an average of 247 rainy days per year. Kuching receives only 5 hours of sunshine per day on average and an average of only 3.7 hours of sunshine per day in the month of January (wettest month of the year). The wettest times are during the North-East Monsoon months of November to February and the city's driest months are June through August. The temperature in Kuching ranges from 19 °C (66 °F) to 36 °C (97 °F) but the average temperature is around 23 °C (73 °F) in the early hours of the morning and rises to around 33 °C (91 °F) during mid afternoon. This temperature stays almost constant throughout the year if it is not affected by the heavy rain and strong winds during the early hours of the morning which can bring the temperature down to 19 °C (66 °F), but this is very rare.

Climate data for Kuching (1991–2020 normals, extremes 1876–present)
Month	Jan	Feb	Mar	Apr	May	Jun	Jul	Aug	Sep	Oct	Nov	Dec	Year
Record high °C (°F)	34.6 (94.3)	34.7 (94.5)	35.2 (95.4)	36.1 (97.0)	36.0 (96.8)	35.6 (96.1)	36.1 (97.0)	36.4 (97.5)	37.1 (98.8)	36.5 (97.7)	34.8 (94.6)	34.7 (94.5)	37.1 (98.8)
Mean daily maximum °C (°F)	30.0 (86.0)	30.2 (86.4)	31.4 (88.5)	32.4 (90.3)	32.7 (90.9)	32.6 (90.7)	32.5 (90.5)	32.6 (90.7)	32.1 (89.8)	32.0 (89.6)	31.7 (89.1)	31.0 (87.8)	31.8 (89.2)
Daily mean °C (°F)	25.9 (78.6)	26.0 (78.8)	26.5 (79.7)	26.8 (80.2)	27.1 (80.8)	27.0 (80.6)	27.0 (80.6)	26.9 (80.4)	26.6 (79.9)	26.3 (79.3)	26.2 (79.2)	26.0 (78.8)	26.5 (79.7)
Mean daily minimum °C (°F)	23.3 (73.9)	23.4 (74.1)	23.6 (74.5)	23.7 (74.7)	23.9 (75.0)	23.7 (74.7)	23.4 (74.1)	23.4 (74.1)	23.3 (73.9)	23.3 (73.9)	23.3 (73.9)	23.3 (73.9)	23.5 (74.3)
Record low °C (°F)	17.8 (64.0)	18.9 (66.0)	18.3 (64.9)	20.0 (68.0)	20.6 (69.1)	18.9 (66.0)	19.4 (66.9)	19.4 (66.9)	19.3 (66.7)	20.5 (68.9)	20.0 (68.0)	18.9 (66.0)	17.8 (64.0)
Average precipitation mm (inches)	672.3 (26.47)	501.4 (19.74)	340.2 (13.39)	303.2 (11.94)	267.8 (10.54)	255.4 (10.06)	200.9 (7.91)	263.7 (10.38)	245.3 (9.66)	343.1 (13.51)	341.5 (13.44)	498.1 (19.61)	4,232.7 (166.64)
Average precipitation days (≥ 1.0 mm)	21.4	17.0	17.6	17.4	15.9	14.5	13.1	14.7	15.8	19.1	21.2	22.8	210.5
Average relative humidity (%)	89	88	86	86	86	84	83	83	85	86	88	89	86
Mean monthly sunshine hours	126	137	149	154	156	159	165	163	158	152	149	136	1,804
Source 1: NOAA
Source 2: Ogimet Meteo Climat (record highs and lows), Deutscher Wetterdienst (humidity, 1975–1985)

== Demography ==
The term "Kuchingite" has been used to describe the people of Kuching, although it is not official. However, the simplest way to call the people of Kuching is only by "orang Kuching", which means "people of Kuching" in English.

=== Ethnicity ===
Ethnic composition in Kuching (2023)
Ethnic group	Percent
Malay	31.8%
Chinese	33.6%
Iban	23.3%
Bidayuh	7.4%
Others	3.7%

In a recent survey by Department of Statistics Malaysia (DoSM) in 2023, the survey reported that Kuching had a total population of 613,522. This including overall population in both Kuching areas (North Kuching, South Kuching, and Padawan) consists primarily of Malays (208,154), Chinese (219,882), Iban (152,897), Bidayuh (48,635), non-Malaysian citizens (5,602), other Sarawak Bumiputras (Orang Ulu) (931), Melanau (6,870) and Indian (10,879). The Chinese are made up of Hokkien, mainly in the urban areas and in the suburbs. Other Chinese subgroups consist of Foochow, Hainanese, Teochew, Cantonese, Hakka and Henghua.

Many people from Iban, Bidayuh, and Orang Ulu communities are mainly Christians (with some people still practising Animism). Meanwhile Chinese also practise either Buddhism, Taoism, Christianity or Islam. The Malays and Melanau are Muslims and live in Kuching District. Malaysian Indian consist 0f 1,396 people in Kuching .Majority of them are Hindus and with minority population of Sikhs and Muslims. Most of the Indians in Kuching are consist the population of professionals like Doctor, Businessman, Lawyer, Police and Government officers.

There is a sizeable population of non-citizens, who mostly come from the bordering Indonesian region of Kalimantan, most of whom are migrant workers. Since the British period, a small population of South Asians—notably, Pakistanis—have lived in the city, their livelihoods primarily the selling of clothing and spices. Other migrants who came during the British era included Bugis from the Dutch East Indies, and other peoples from neighbouring Dutch Borneo. Being a diverse, "melting-pot" city, interracial marriages (among those of different ethnic backgrounds) are common in Kuching, and the city itself is home to over 30 distinct ethnic groups.

Religious sites in Kuching

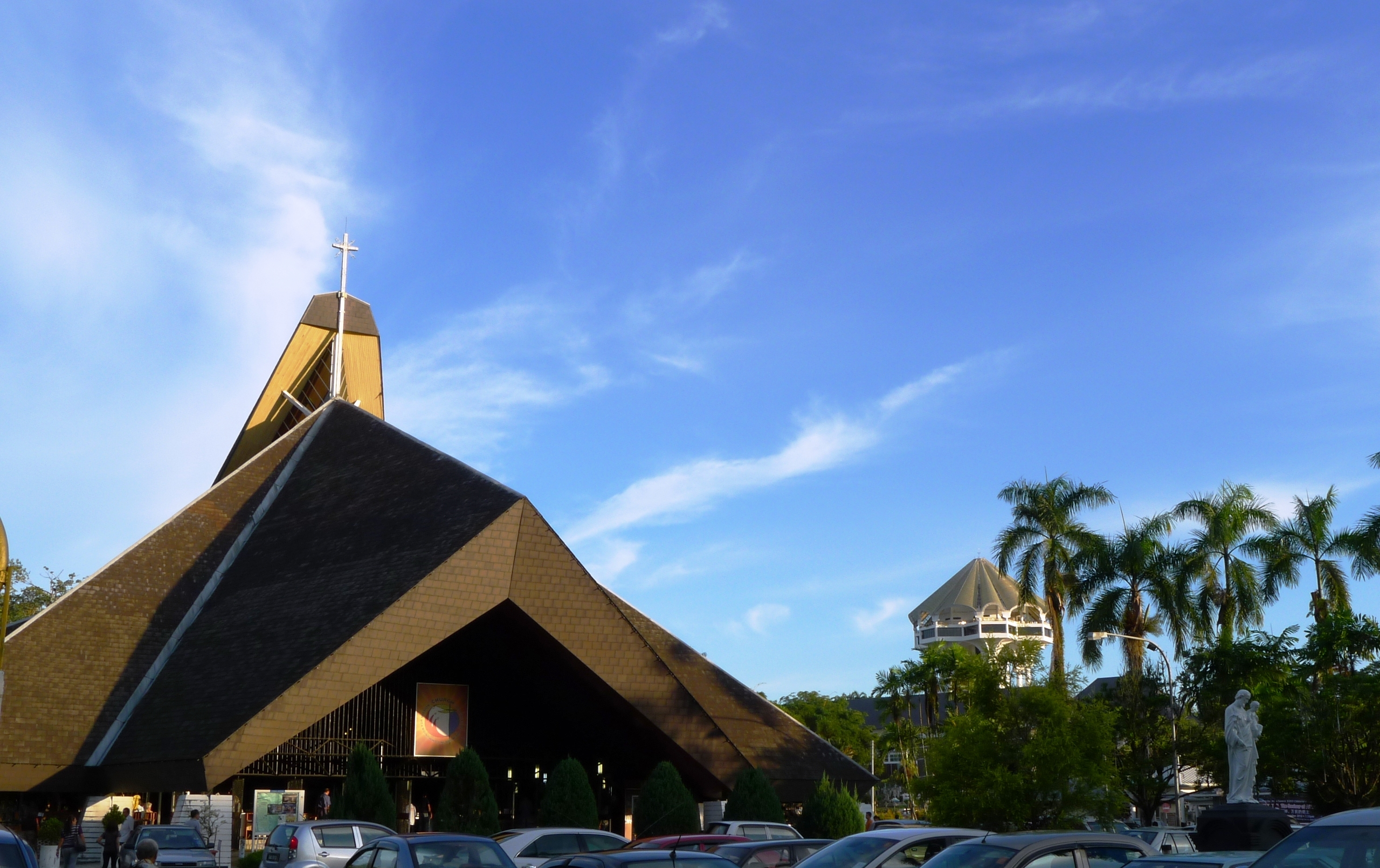
St. Joseph's Cathedral (Roman Catholic)

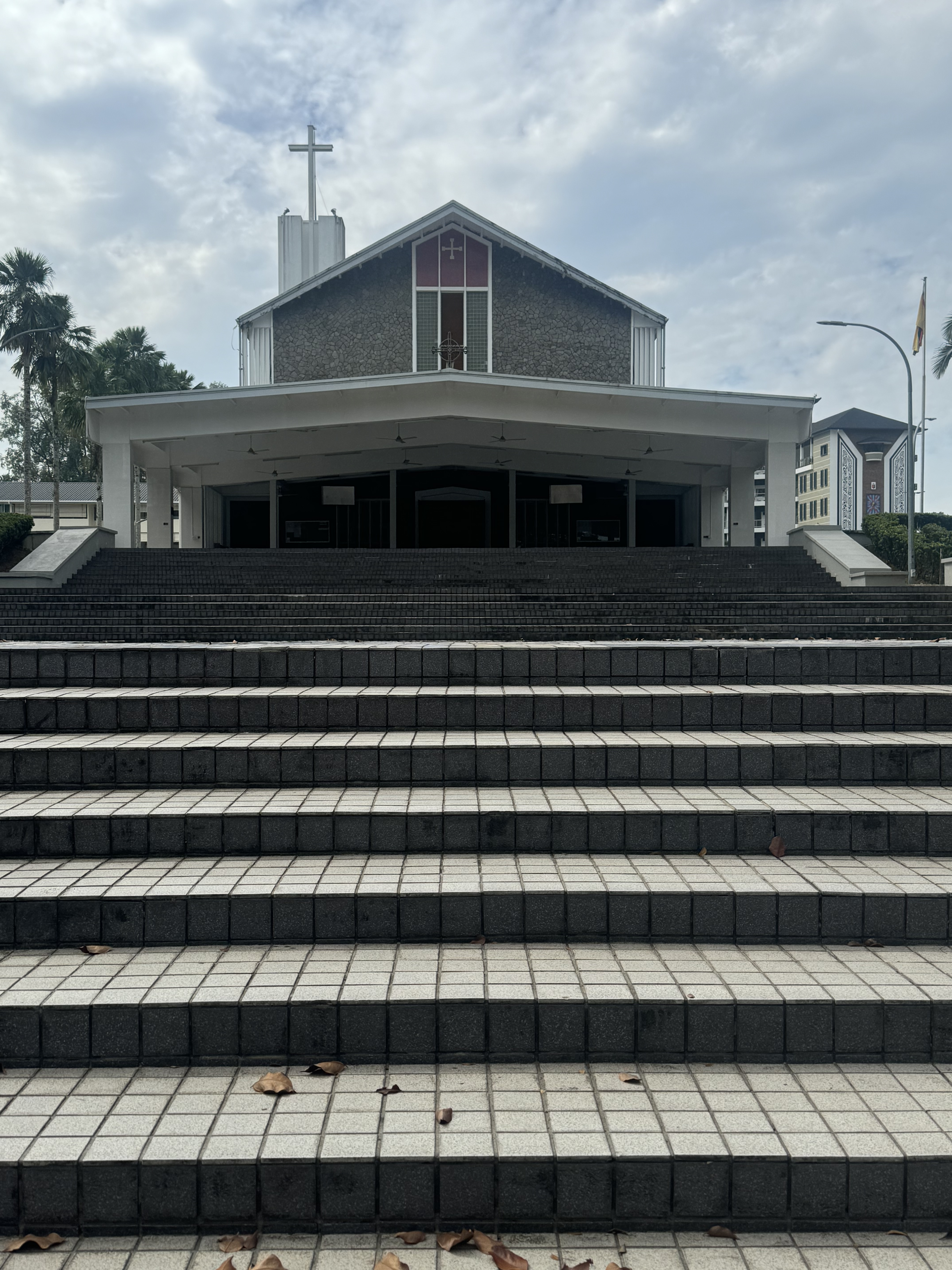
St. Thomas's Cathedral (Anglican)

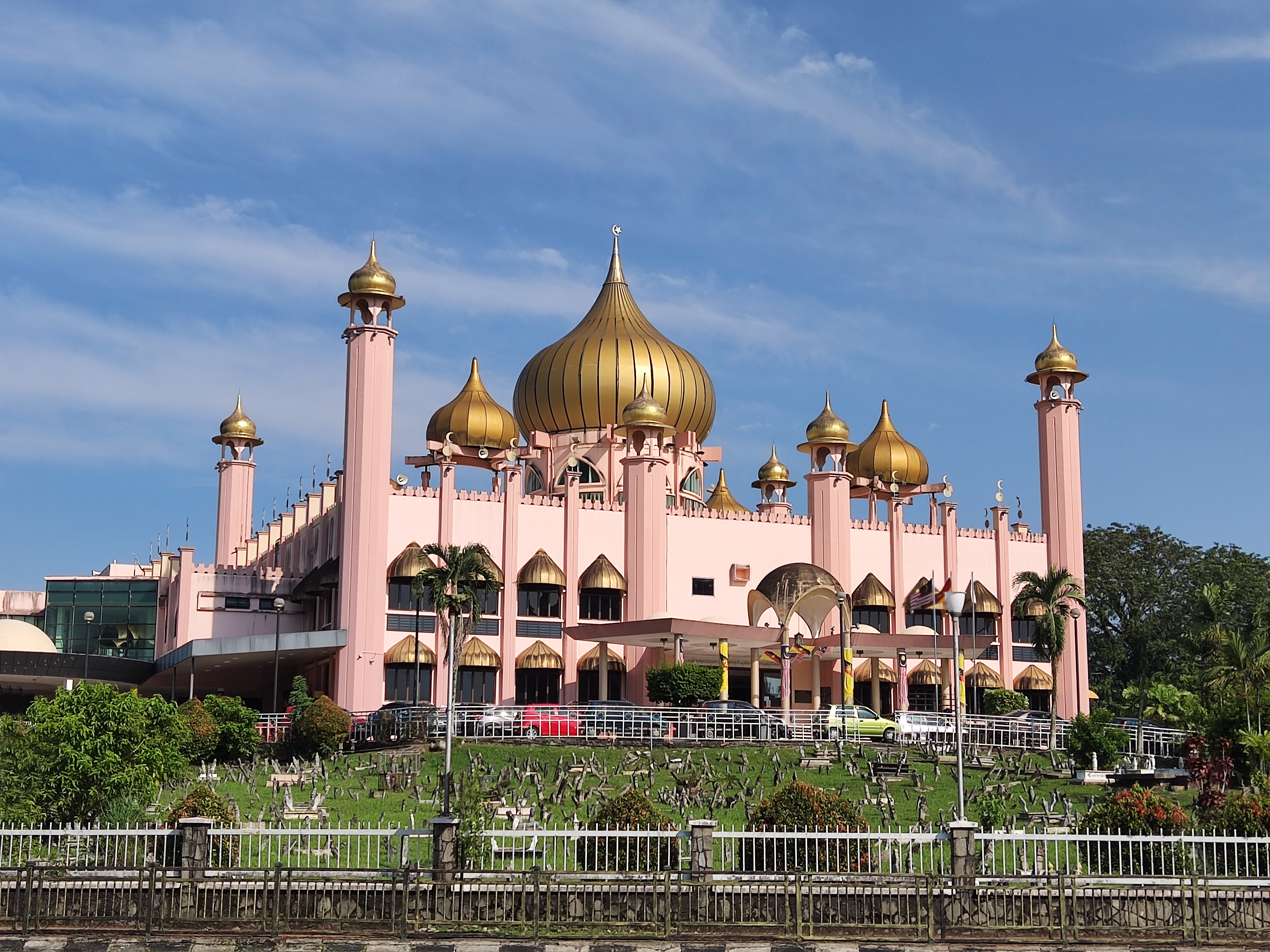
Kuching City Mosque

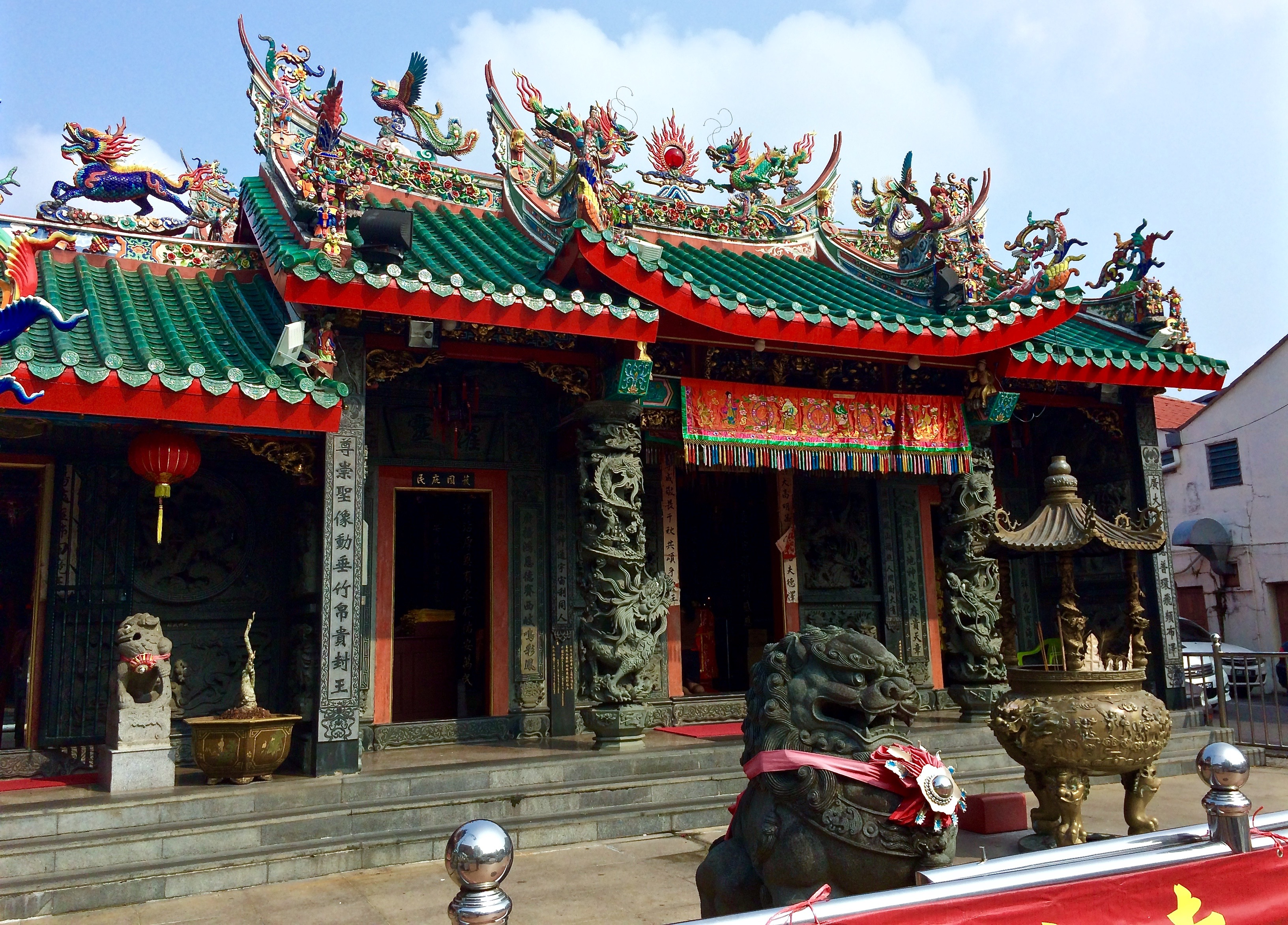
Hong San Si Temple (Buddhist)

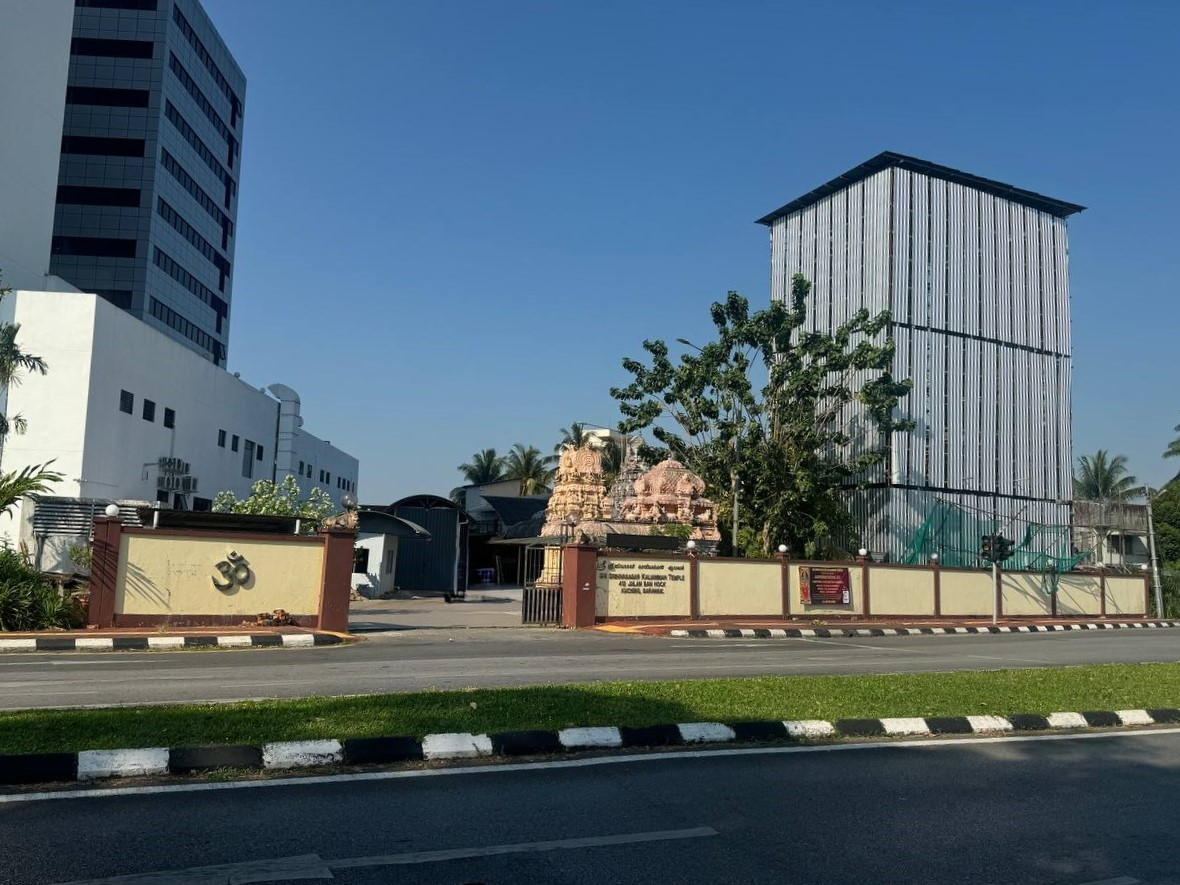
Sri Srinivasagar Kaliamman Temple

=== Languages ===
Besides being the capital city of Sarawak, Kuching is a business hub and cultural centre for the Malay populace. The dialect of Malay spoken in Kuching is known as Bahasa Sarawak (Sarawakian Malay Language), a subset of the Malay language. The local dialect in Kuching is different from that spoken or heard in Miri. Since the second-largest population in Kuching is made up of Han Chinese, the Chinese language is also commonly spoken, particularly Hokkien and Mandarin. Almost all residents are able to speak English. A number of speciality and private schools provide English as a medium of instruction (primarily for wealthy and/or expatriate children), among other foreign language courses which can be found through the city.

== Economy ==
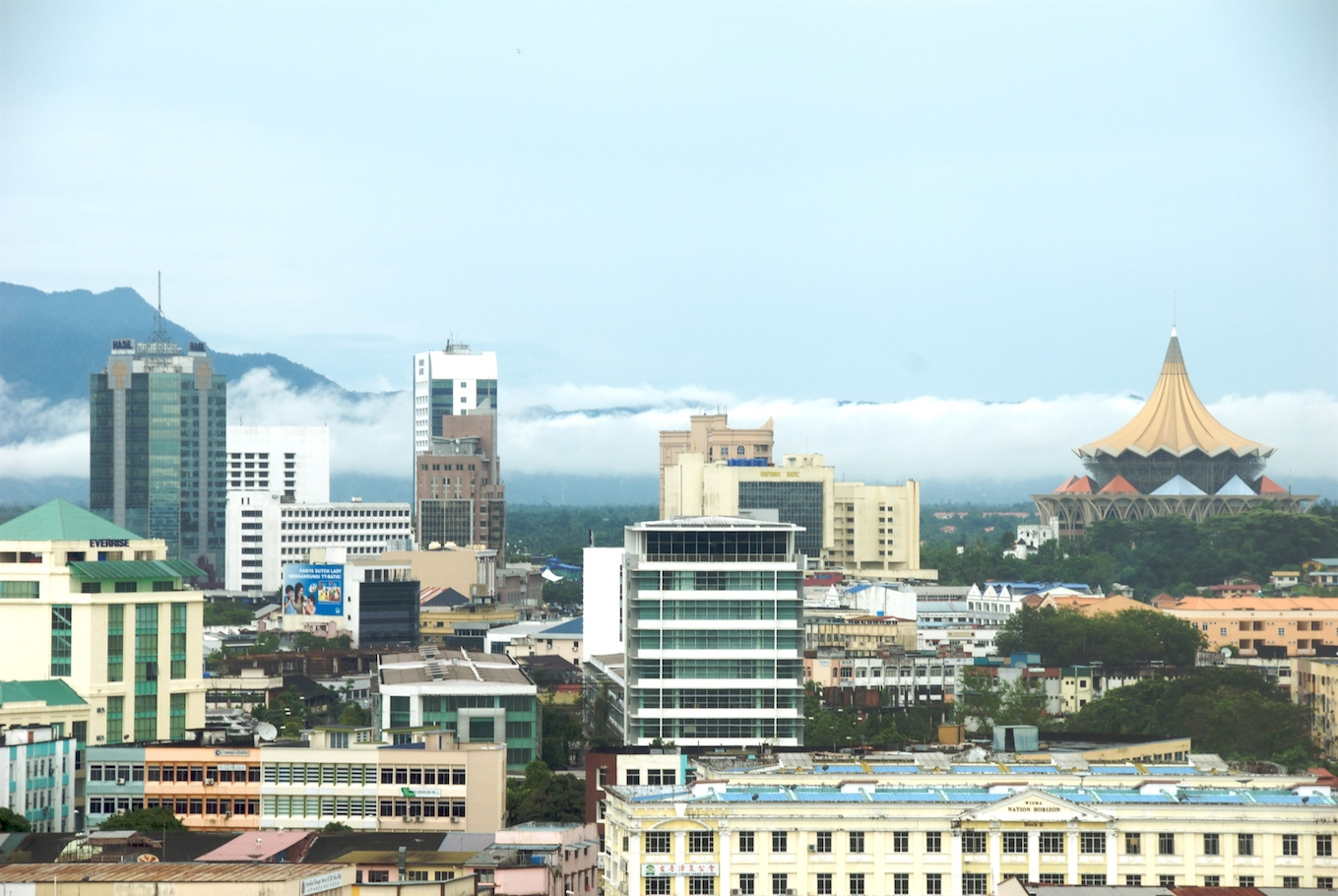
Kuching as the commercial centre of Sarawak.

Kuching is one of the main industrial and commercial centres for Sarawak. Many state-level, national-level, and international commercial banks, as well as some insurance companies, maintain their headquarters and corporate offices here. The economy is dominated by the primary sector, and currently by the tertiary-based industry, as the state government envisioned Sarawak being transformed into a more developed state by 2020.

There are three main industrial areas in Kuching—Pending Industrial Estate (mixed and light industries), Demak Laut Industrial Park (mixed, light, and medium industries) and Sama Jaya Free Industrial Zone (hi-tech, computer and electronics industries). This is intended to boost the city's commercial and industrial activity, making it a major point of growth in East Malaysia, as well for the BIMP-EAGA (Brunei-Indonesia-Malaysia-Philippines East ASEAN Growth Area). Kuching has hosted numerous national, regional and international conferences, congresses and trade fairs, such as the Malaysia Global Business Forum, Tomorrow's Leaders Summit, International Hydropower Association (IHA) World Congress, ASEAN Tourism Forum, and Routes Asia Conference. Furthermore, Kuching was chosen as a permanent host for the biennial ASEAN International Film Festival and Awards (AIFFA). These events are normally held at the Borneo Convention Centre.

Kuching Port Authority (KPA), established in 1961, started its operations at Tanah Puteh Port (Sim Kheng Hong Port) in 1975 with an annual capacity of 350,000 tonnes. Its operations have since been shifted to Pending and Senari terminals, with an annual capacity of 2.9 million tonnes and 7 million tonnes, respectively. KPA also controls Biawak Oil Jetty, which handles petroleum products.

Historically, the Chinese have contributed heavily to the city's economy since their migration during the Brunei Sultanate period, after the discovery of antimony ore, and also during the Charles Vyner Brooke administration (who encouraged the immigration of the Chinese for planting black pepper).

== Transport ==
=== Land ===
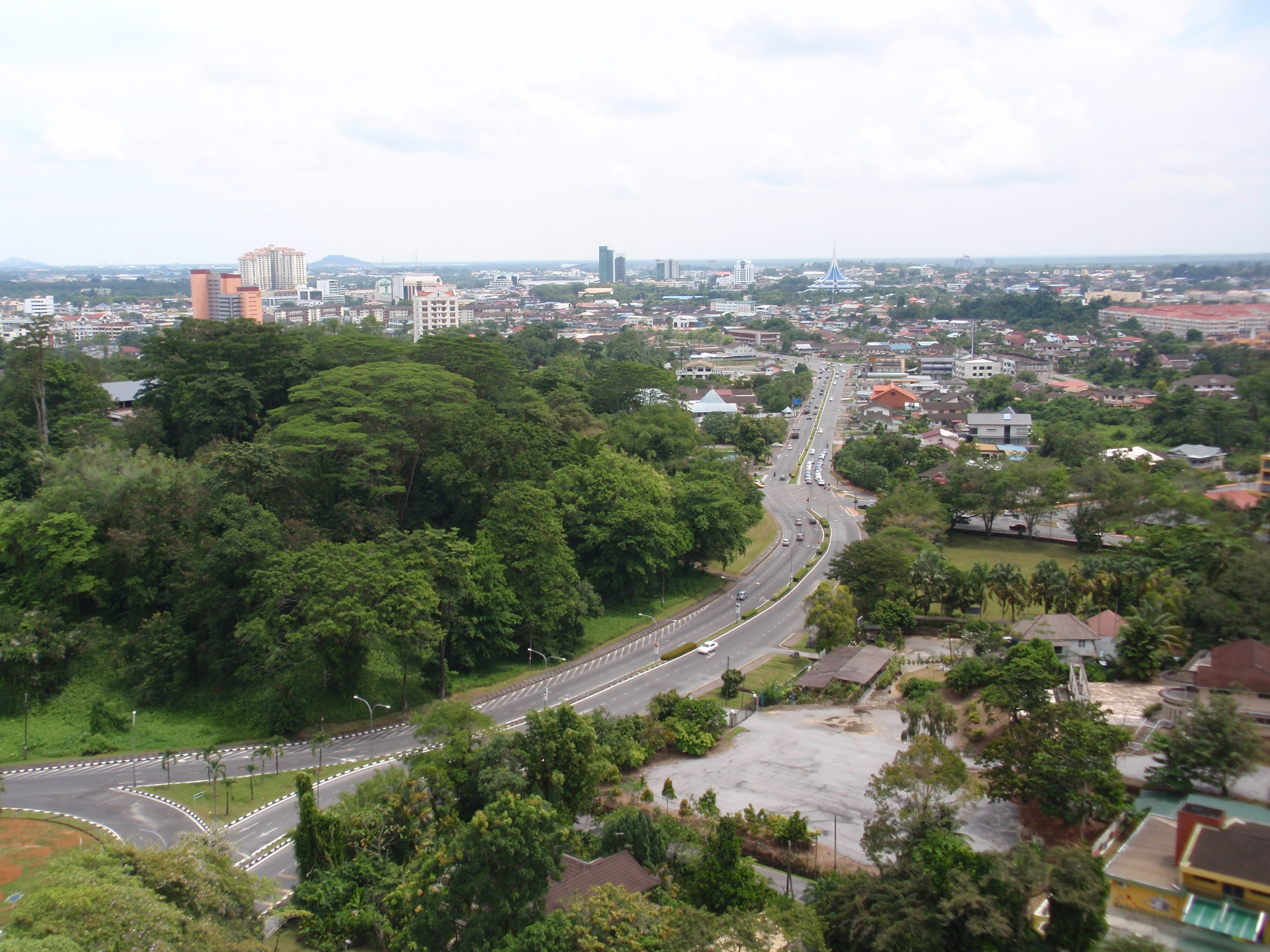
The city highway.

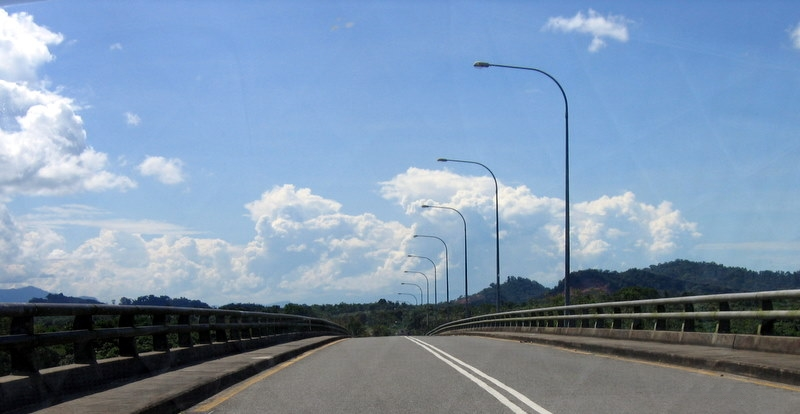
New asphalt road connecting the rural areas with the city.

Kuching's roads, thoroughfares and motorways are overseen by one of the two local councils, the DBKU (Dewan Bandaraya Kuching Utara) and MBKS (Majlis Bandaraya Kuching Selatan), or the state's Public Works Department. Roads overseen by the latter department are generally state roads or federal roads.

Most major internal roads are dual-carriageways. Kuching is linked by roads to other towns within Sarawak, mainly by federal roads. The city is also famous for a number of roundabouts, including the oldest and largest one, the Datuk Abang Kipali Bin Abang Akip Roundabout. The roundabouts are typically landscaped and are efficient for handling traffic congestion. However, traffic lights are more commonly used now as the city's traffic continues to rise.

As Kuching is located near the equator, potholes have the tendency to develop on the roads during the monsoon season, usually at the end of the year, due to coinciding with winter in the Northern Hemisphere. Roads leading outside of the city to the more rural regions were of a slightly inferior quality, with regards to maintenance, but are now being upgraded. Highway routes from Kuching include:

- FT 1-15 Kuching–Serian Highway
- FT 801 Kuching Bypass
- Kuching–Kota Samarahan Expressway
- Tun Salahuddin Bridge
- Matang Highway

==== Public transport ====
===== Urban rail =====
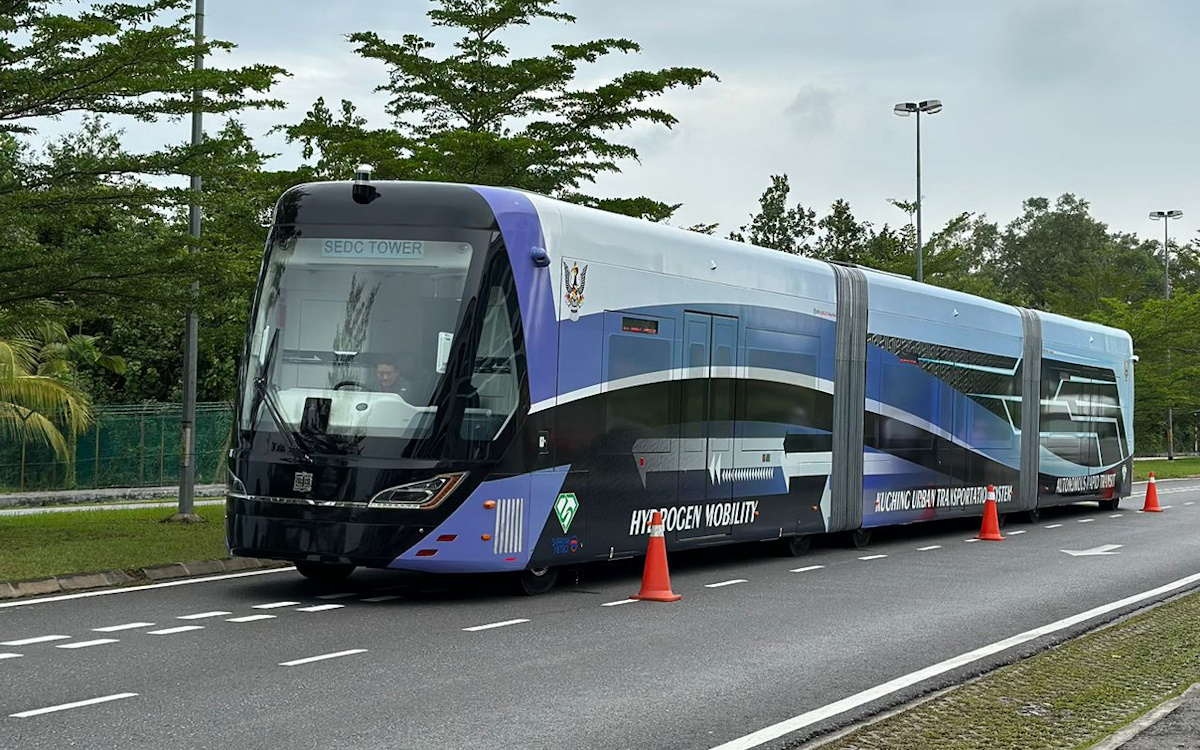
Prototype of the Kuching ART vehicle with temporary livery, undergoing an engineering run around the SEDC Tower area.

The Kuching Urban Transportation System (KUTS) is an under-construction autonomous rail rapid transit (ART) system that will serve as the main mode of urban metro public transport for the city. Originally envisioned to be a bus rapid transit (BRT) system, it was later scrapped to make way for a hydrogen powered light rapid transit (LRT) system similar to the ones seen in Kuala Lumpur. This was also later scrapped in favor of the current ART system which will use also use hydrogen as its main source of power. The Kuching ART is constructed, owned, and fully operated by Sarawak Metro, a government-linked company tasked to develop the state's public transportation ambitions. Currently, there are 3 lines that are being built for the system – SM Blue Line (Rembus to Hikmah Exchange), SR Red Line (Kuching Sentral to Pending), and DM Green Line (Pending to Damai Sentral), with a 4th line named the YL Yellow Line (Sarawak General Hospital to Moyan) which has been proposed for the second phase of the system.

===== Taxis =====
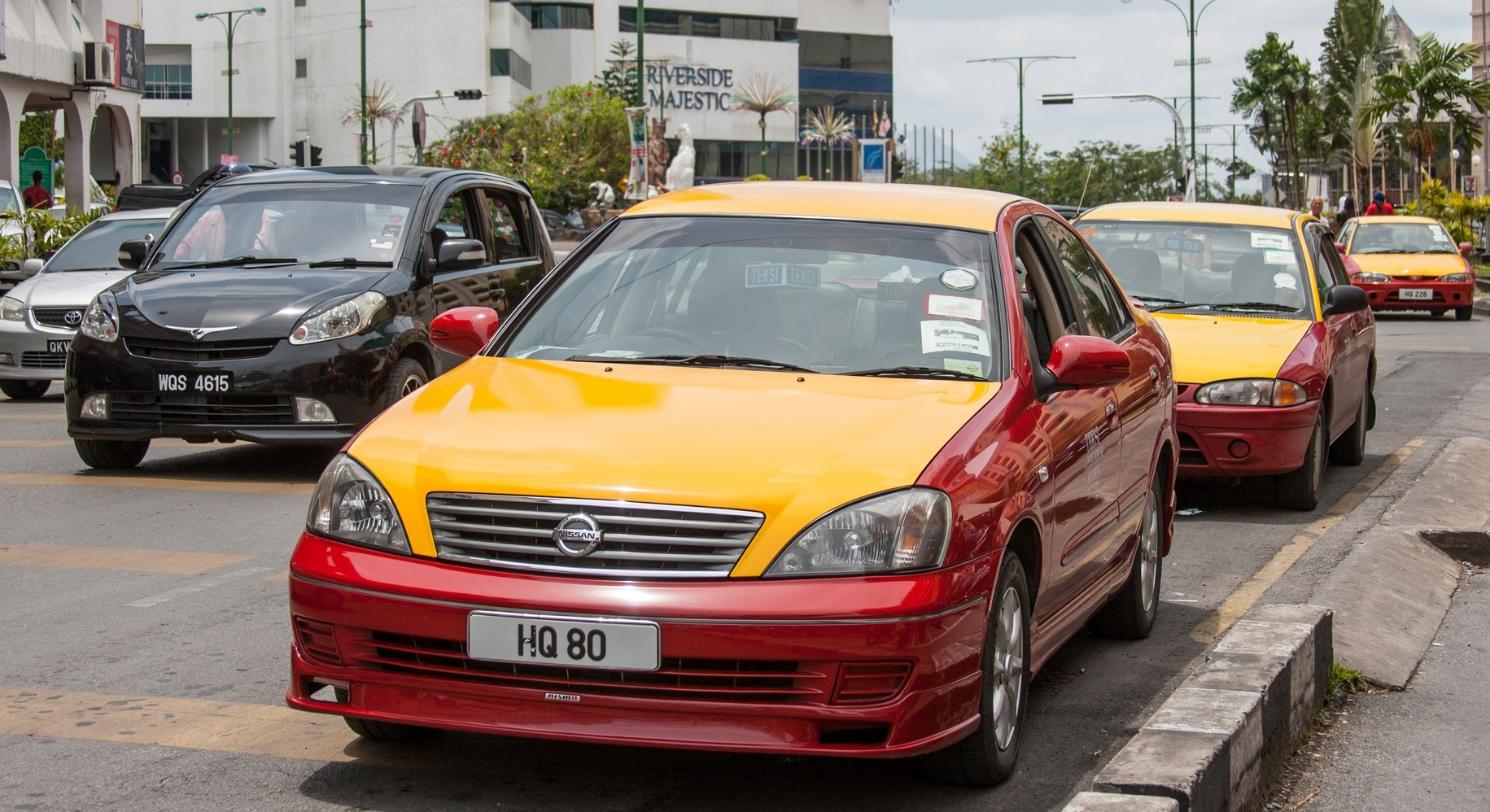
The main taxis in the city are painted in red and yellow.

There are two types of taxis operating within the city: the standard taxis are the red-and-yellow painted automobiles. A slightly larger taxi, painted in blue, is available as well; these are more comfortable, but slightly more expensive (thus known as "executive taxis"). In 2014, a smartphone taxi-booking app called GrabTaxi was launched, making Kuching the fifth area (after Klang Valley, Cyberjaya, Putrajaya, and Johor Bahru) to benefit from the app's services and coverage.

===== Buses =====
There are currently several metro bus routes that serve the area of Greater Kuching. These routes are operated by different local bus companies with varying degrees of fares and can generally get people around the city when needed. However, they are often cited as difficult to use as their timetables usually operate at inconvenient times as well as being not as user-friendly due to the lack of information of these bus routes online. With the introduction of the BAS.MY service in early 2025, there have been an increase in locals interested to use the bus services to get to their destinations.

====== Bus Express ======
Operating Route
Kuching-Serian-Sarikei-Sibu-Bintulu-Miri
Kuching-Kapit
Kuching-Saratok
Kuching-Pontianak

====== Local Bus ======
Route No.	Operating Route	Remark
3A	Kuching-Serian	Traditional Pan Borneo Highway bus route
K5	Kuching-BDR, Baru Samariang	Kuching North City Hall, Kuching Cat Museum
K7	Kuching-Taman Malihah	
K8	Kuching-Tabuan Jaya, Stutong	BDC, The Indonesian Consulate General in Kuching
K21	Kuching-Politeknik	Kubah National Park, Kubah Ria, Matang
103	Open Air Market - Semenggoh Wildlife Center (Orangutan) Pasar Open Air - Pusat Hidupan Liar Semenggoh Orangutan 露天巴剎 - 實蒙谷人猿猩猩野生動物中心	Kuching Metro Electric City Bus

====== Stage Bus (BAS.MY services) ======
BusAsia (Biaramas Express) currently operates ten bus routes under the BAS.MY Kuching programme, connecting Kuching to its suburbs and surrounding towns.

Route number	Origin	Destination	Service type	Operator	Notes
Q01	Open Air Market Bus Terminal	Taman Malihah	Trunk	Biaramas Express	
Q05	Saujana Bus Terminal	SMK Agama Matang 2	Trunk	Biaramas Express	
Q06	Saujana Bus Terminal	Kampung Benuk	Trunk	Biaramas Express	
Q07	Saujana Bus Terminal	Batu Kawa	Trunk	Biaramas Express	
Q08	Open Air Market Bus Terminal	Bau Bus Terminal	Trunk	Biaramas Express	
Q09	Open Air Market Bus Terminal	Muara Tebas Bus Terminal	Trunk	Biaramas Express	Serves Bako Bus Terminal in both directions.
Q10	Open Air Market Bus Terminal	Serian Bus Terminal	Trunk	Biaramas Express	Serves Pusat Jantung Sarawak and Universiti Malaysia Sarawak in both directions.
Q11	Saujana Bus Terminal	Arang Road	Loop	Biaramas Express	Loop service.
Q12	Saujana Bus Terminal	Taman Hui Sing	Loop	Biaramas Express	Loop service.
Q13	Open Air Market Bus Terminal	Siburan	Trunk	Biaramas Express	
Q14	Open Air Market Bus Terminal	Summer Mall Bus Terminal	Trunk	Biaramas Express	
Q15	Kuching Sentral Bus Terminal	Saujana Bus Terminal	Trunk	Biaramas Express	Loop service.
Q16	Open Air Market Bus Terminal	Taman Sukma	Trunk	Biaramas Express	Loop service.

The main bus terminal is Kuching Sentral, which opened in 2012, located in the south of the city—about 5 minutes' drive away from Kuching International Airport and 20 minutes from the city centre. The terminal serves as a starting point for long-distance trips to Brunei, Sabah, and West Kalimantan, Indonesia. Another bus terminal is the Old Kuching Bus Terminal, which is only operating as some bus companies and drivers reportedly have been unwilling to use Kuching Sentral's newer facilities, due to undisclosed or unknown reasons. Other minibuses and carpool van services are also available in the city.

=== Water ===
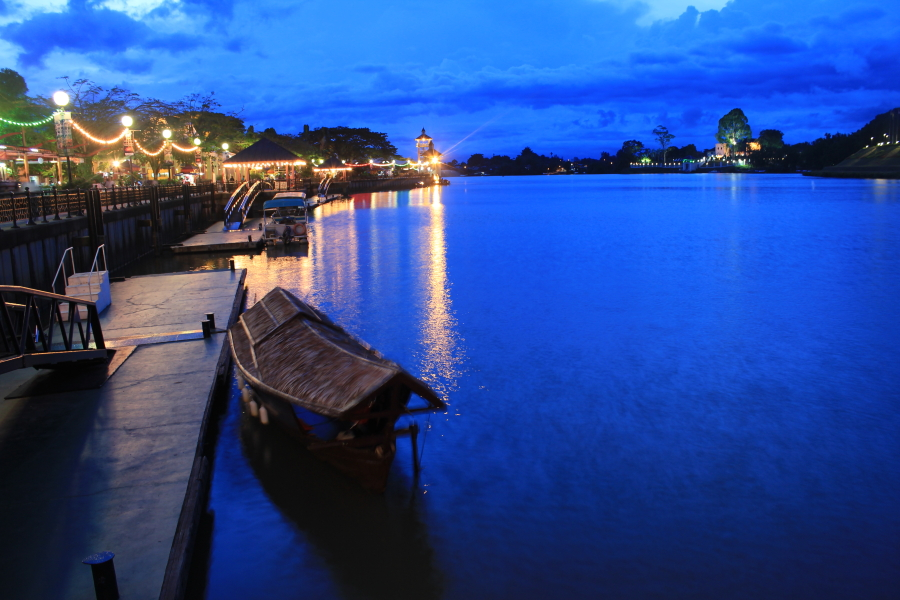
A traditional roofed wooden sampan, the main water transport in Kuching.

Kuching, like most towns in Sarawak, has connections to other urban centres and settlements by water transport. Between the banks of the Sarawak River, near the city centre, many 'tambang' (traditional roofed wooden sampan) can be seen carrying passengers from one riverbank to another. For those staying along the river banks, it is a short way to getting to the city-proper. The wharf for express boats servicing transport to further areas such as Sibu and Bintulu, is located in the east of the city at the Sim Kheng Hong Port (formerly known as the Tanah Puteh Port) in Pending.

=== Air ===
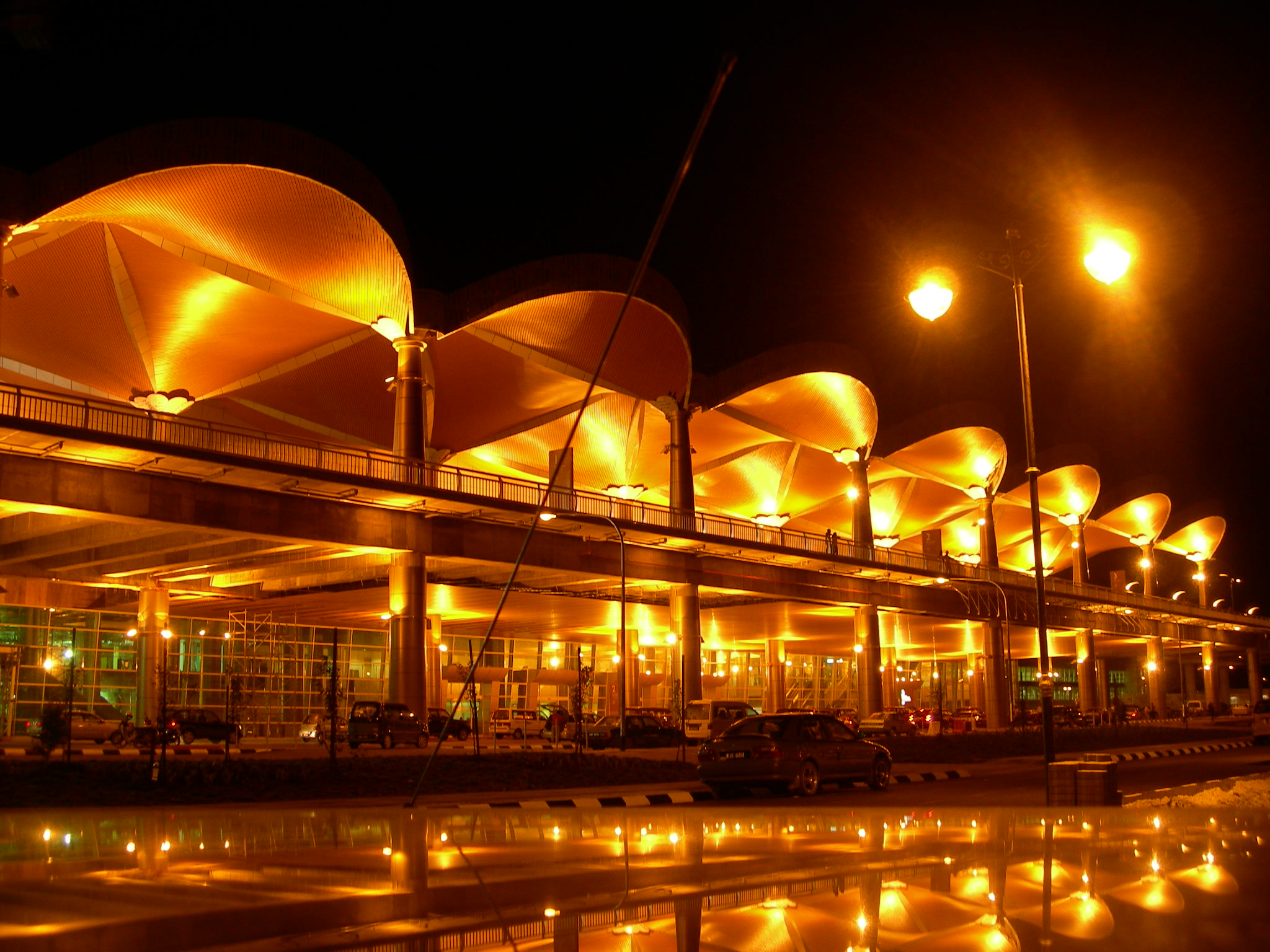
Kuching International Airport at night.

Kuching International Airport (KCH) (ICAO Code: WBGG) is the main gateway for air passengers. The airport's history dates back to the 1940s and today the airport has undergone and is still undergoing many major redevelopments. The airport terminal is listed as the fourth busiest airport in Malaysia according to total passenger movements in 2013. Since 2009, the airport has grown rapidly with an increasing number of passengers and aircraft movement. It is currently the main hub for AirBorneo (formerly known as MASwings), which also serves flights to smaller towns and rural areas in East Malaysia. It also acts as a secondary hub for Malaysia Airlines and AirAsia.

== Other utilities ==
=== Courts of law and legal enforcement ===
The current court complex is located in Petra Jaya. It contains the High Court, Sessions Court, and the Magistrate Court. Another courts of Syariah and native were also located in the city. The Sarawak Police Contingent Headquarters is located in Badruddin Street. There is only one district headquarters in the city, which is the Kuching District police headquarters located in Simpang Tiga Road. Kuching Prison Complex is located in Puncak Borneo Street. Temporary lock-ups or prison cells are found in most police stations around the city.

=== Healthcare ===
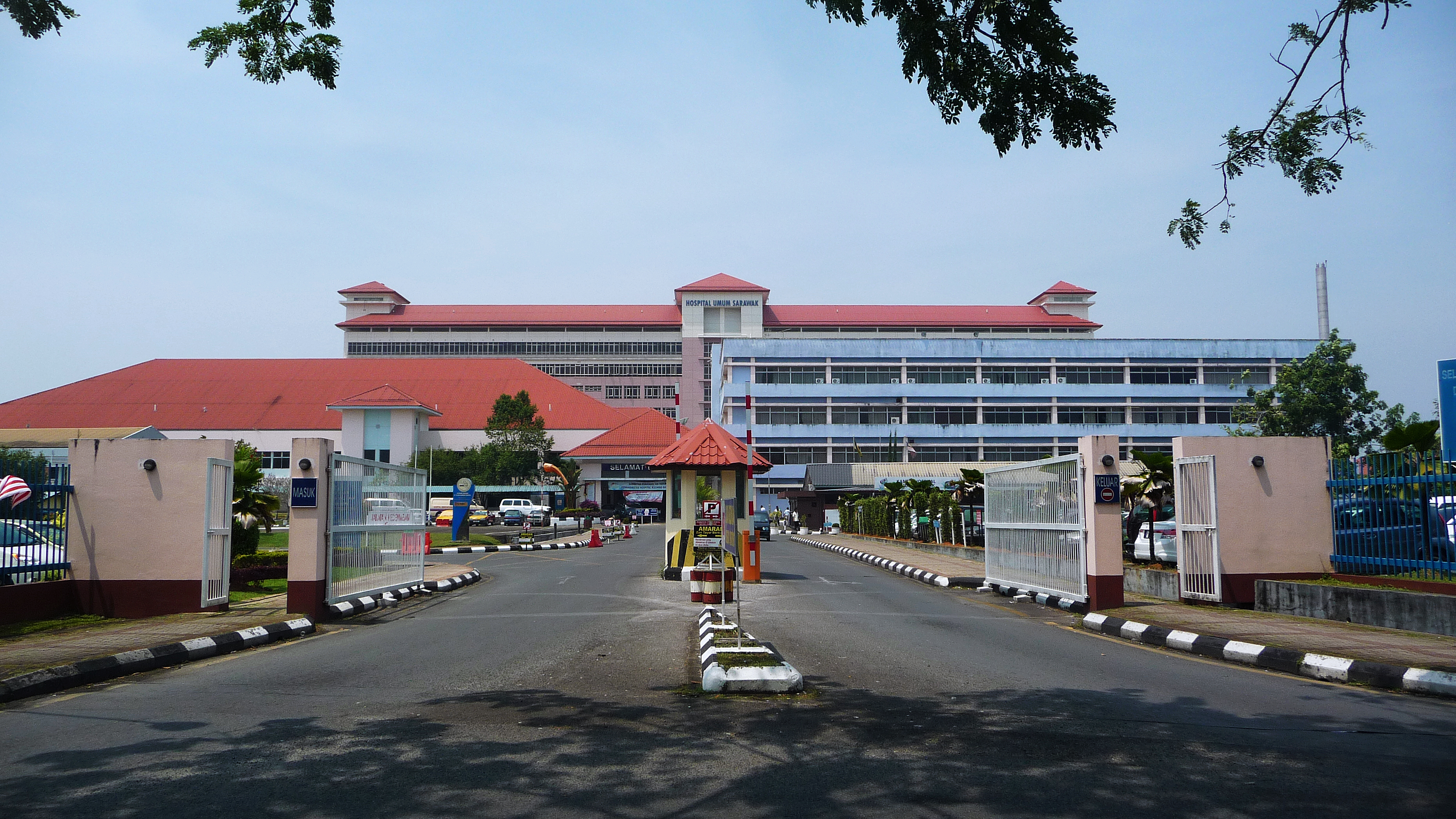
The Sarawak General Hospital.

There are many types of health services in the city, such as the main public hospitals, public health clinics, other type of health clinics, mobile clinic, flying doctor service, village clinics, and community clinic. The main hospital is the Sarawak General Hospital which is the oldest hospital since 1923. Another hospital is Rajah Charles Brooke Memorial Hospital. Hospital Sentosa (Sentosa Mental Hospital), which was opened in 1958, provides psychiatric services for the entire state and known as the second oldest hospital in Sarawak after the main hospital.

Normah Medical Specialist Centre in Petra Jaya is the largest private hospital (with 130 beds) in Sarawak. In addition, three other large private health facilities are Borneo Medical Centre with (120 beds), Timberland Medical Centre with (100 beds), and KPJ Healthcare with (75 beds). Kuching Specialist Hospital located in BDC was scheduled to open its operation to the public in 2020, with a 70-bed capacity.

== Education ==
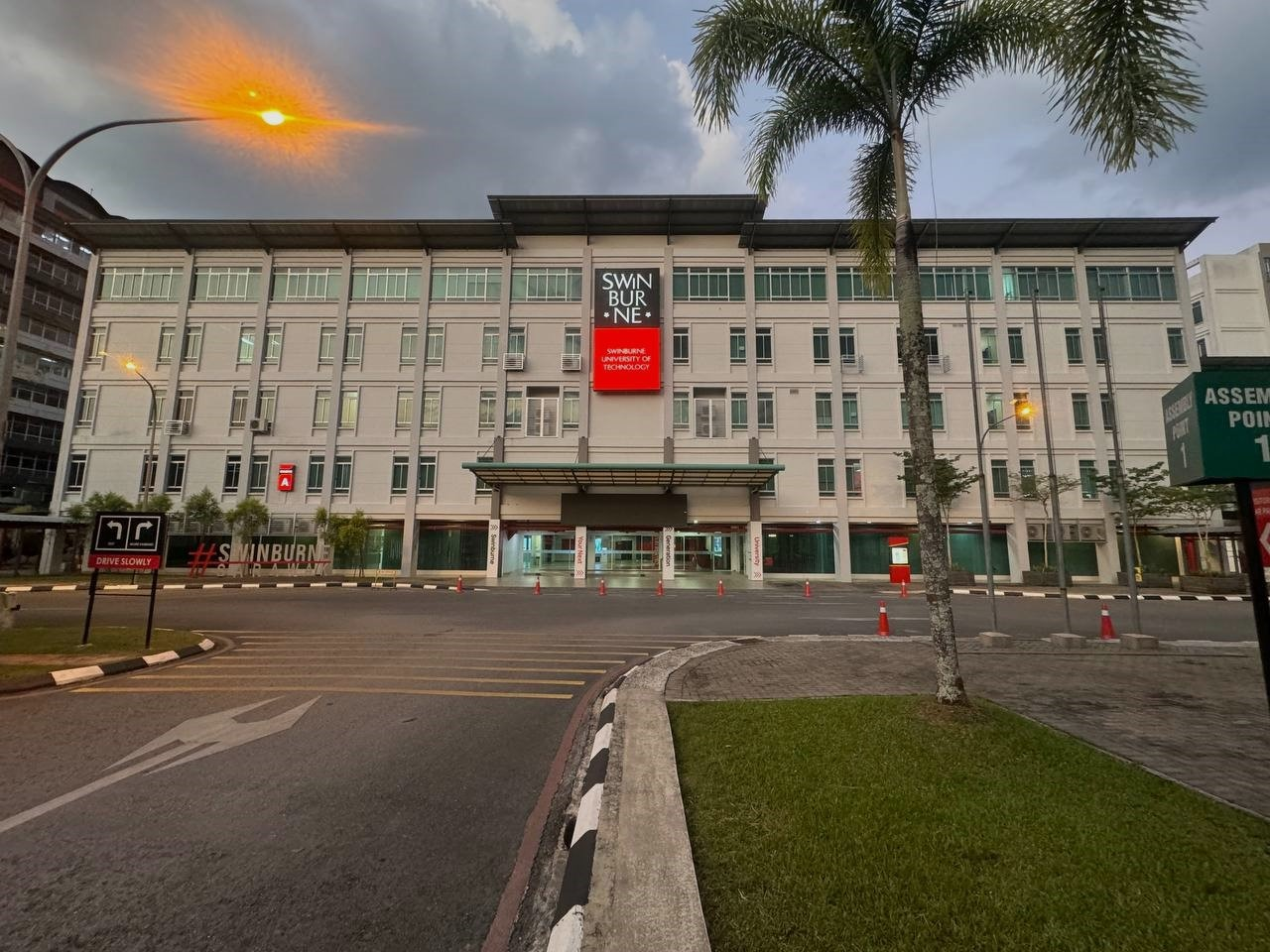
Swinburne University of Technology Sarawak Campus.

In the city, all schools under the National Education System (government education institution category), are managed by the Kuching Combined Education Office (Pejabat Pelajaran Gabungan Kuching). There are many government or state schools in and around the city. Like other Malaysian schools, schools in the city are divided into four levels of education — pre-school, primary, secondary (lower and upper) and post-secondary (excluding tertiary). Among the well-established and prestigious boarding schools in the city is Sekolah Menengah Sains Kuching, which is located at Batu Kawa and Sekolah Menengah Sains Kuching Utara, which is located at Matang Jaya. Other government secondary schools including some of the oldest and well known are SMK St. Joseph, SMK St. Thomas, SMK St. Teresa and SMK St. Mary as well as others like SMK Green Road, Kolej Datu Patinggi Abang Haji Abdillah, SMK Tun Abang Haji Openg, SMK Batu Lintang, and SMK Padungan. Kuching has 4 out of 14 Chinese independent schools in Sarawak. These are Chung Hua Middle School No. 1 (古晋中华第一中学), Chung Hua Middle School No. 3 (古晋中华第三中学), Chung Hua Middle School No. 4 (古晋中华第四中学) and Batu Kawa Min Lit secondary school (石角民立中学). There are also three international schools in Kuching, namely Tunku Putra International School, Lodge International School and Borneo International School. Other private schools in Kuching are Sunny Hill School and St. Joseph's Private Schools.

There are currently no public university campuses in Kuching, apart from the Universiti Malaysia Sarawak (UNIMAS) Faculty of Medicine and Health Sciences building situated next to the Sarawak General Hospital. The Sarawak State Government moved the last remaining public university campus (Universiti Teknologi MARA) from Kuching to Kota Samarahan in 1997 in a long-term initiative to transform Kota Samarahan into an education hub. Kuching is home to three private universities: the Swinburne University of Technology Sarawak Campus, the only branch campus of Swinburne University of Technology outside Australia; Executive College; and UCSI University, Sarawak Campus which houses the Faculty of Hospitality and Management. A polytechnic and community college, both known as Politeknik Kuching Sarawak and Kolej Komuniti Kuching are also located in the city.

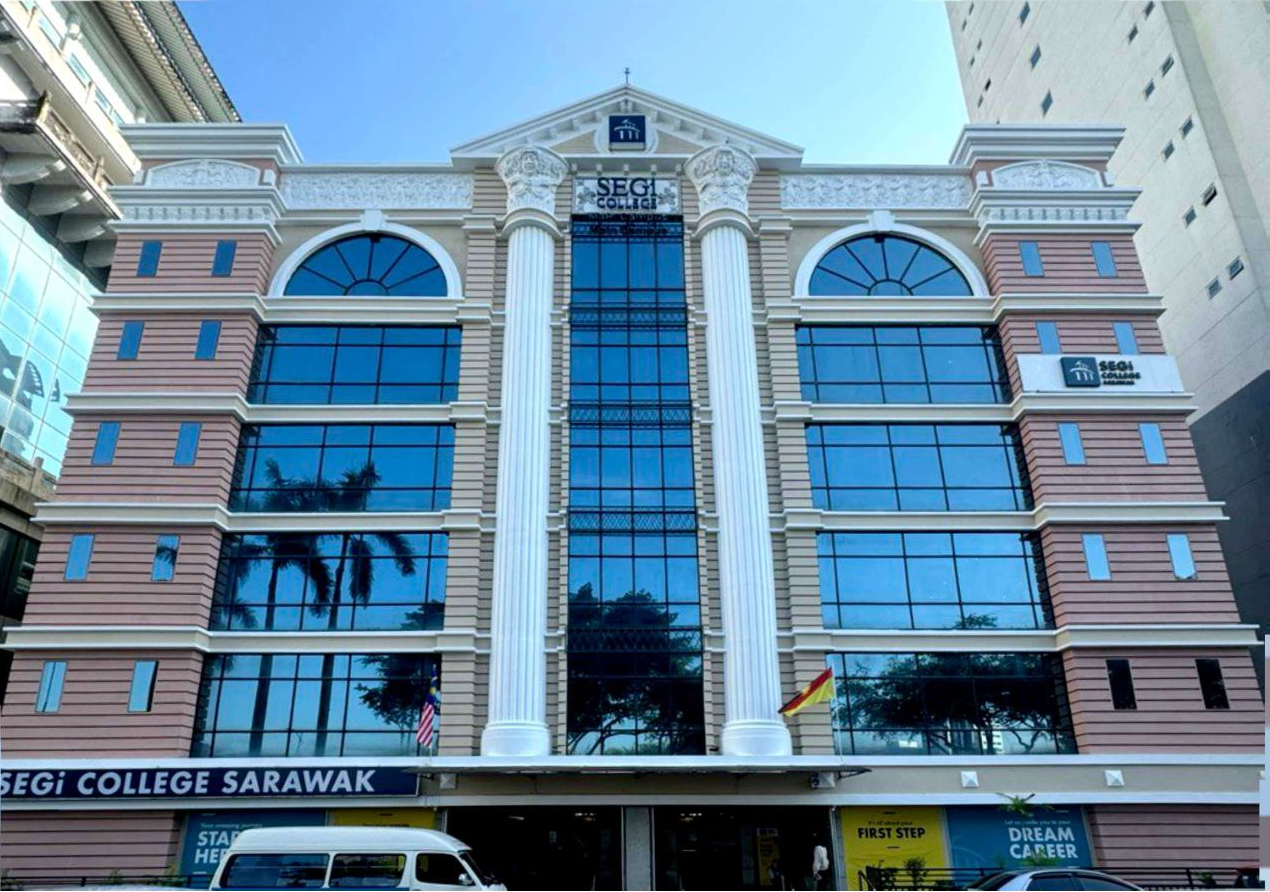
SEGi College Sarawak.

Other private colleges can be found through the city with most of the colleges are subsidiaries from universities and university colleges established in West Malaysia, such as SEGi College, Sarawak, Sunway College Kuching, Limkokwing Borneo, PTPL Sarawak, Wawasan Open University, Open University Malaysia, and Twintech College Sarawak. There are private institutions conducting franchised programmes from full-fledged universities (apart from running their own courses) such as SATT College (conducting franchised programmes from Universiti Teknologi MARA) and the Institute of Dynamic Management, Sarawak (conducting franchised programmes from Universiti Tun Abdul Razak). The International College of Advanced Technology Sarawak or ICATS is an institution created as the state government's initiative to enhance technical and vocational training education among school leavers. The college was established from the former INTI College Sarawak facilities. Operated by a state-owned subsidiary, ICATS focuses on producing human capital for the hi-tech sector, especially for the development of the Sarawak Corridor of Renewable Energy.

=== Libraries ===
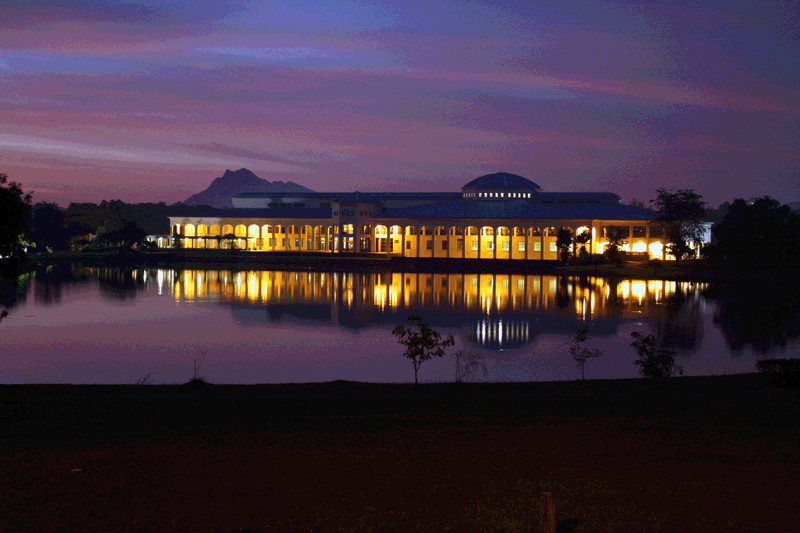
The Sarawak State Library.

The Sarawak State Library is the major information resource centre and provides information services for the public and private sectors. The library serves Kuching and its outskirts as the main depository of public records. In addition, it administers, monitors, and facilitates the operations of 36 village libraries in the state funded by the National Library of Malaysia.

Other public libraries in Kuching include the DBKU City Library and village libraries such as in Bandar Baru Samariang, Kampung Samariang Lama, and Taman Sepakat Jaya.

== Culture, leisure and sport ==
=== Attractions and recreation spots ===
==== Cultural ====
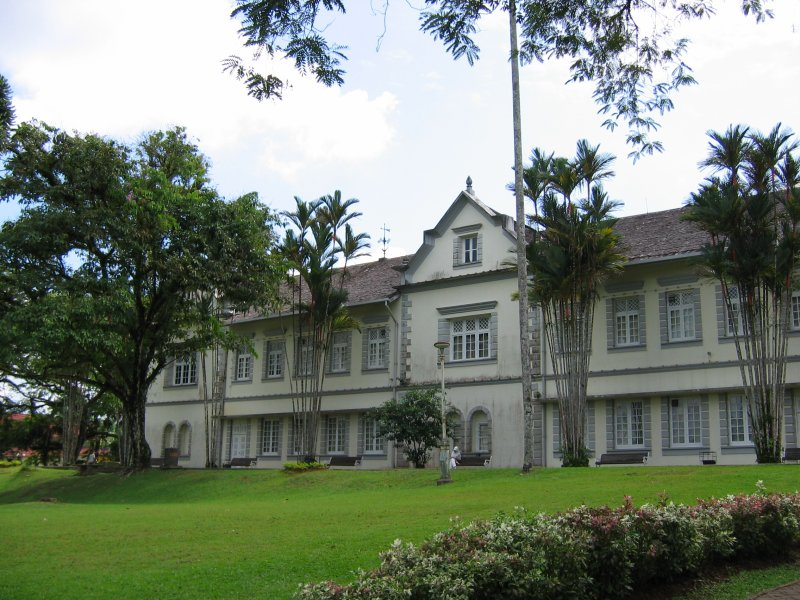
The Sarawak State Museum building was built by Rajah Charles Brooke in 1891 and designed based on the architecture of a Normandy town hall.

Kuching maintains several museums showcasing its culture and history. The Sarawak State Museum is one of the finest museums in Asia and is known as Kuching's oldest and most historical building, which exhibits collections of the indigenous races in Sarawak. Directly opposite the Sarawak Museum is the Borneo Cultures Museum which replaced the Tun Abdul Razak Hall. The Borneo Cultures Museum (opened on 9 March 2022) is a modern five-storey building with a distinctive architectural design that reflects Sarawak's unique traditional crafts and rich cultural heritage. While located right behind the Borneo Cultures Museum is the Islamic Heritage Museum.

Other museums in Kuching include the Chinese History Museum, Kuching Cat Museum, Sarawak Timber Museum and Textile Museum Sarawak. Kuching is also home to the first ever planetarium in Malaysia, the Sultan Iskandar Planetarium which is adjacent to the Kuching Civic Centre.

==== Historical ====
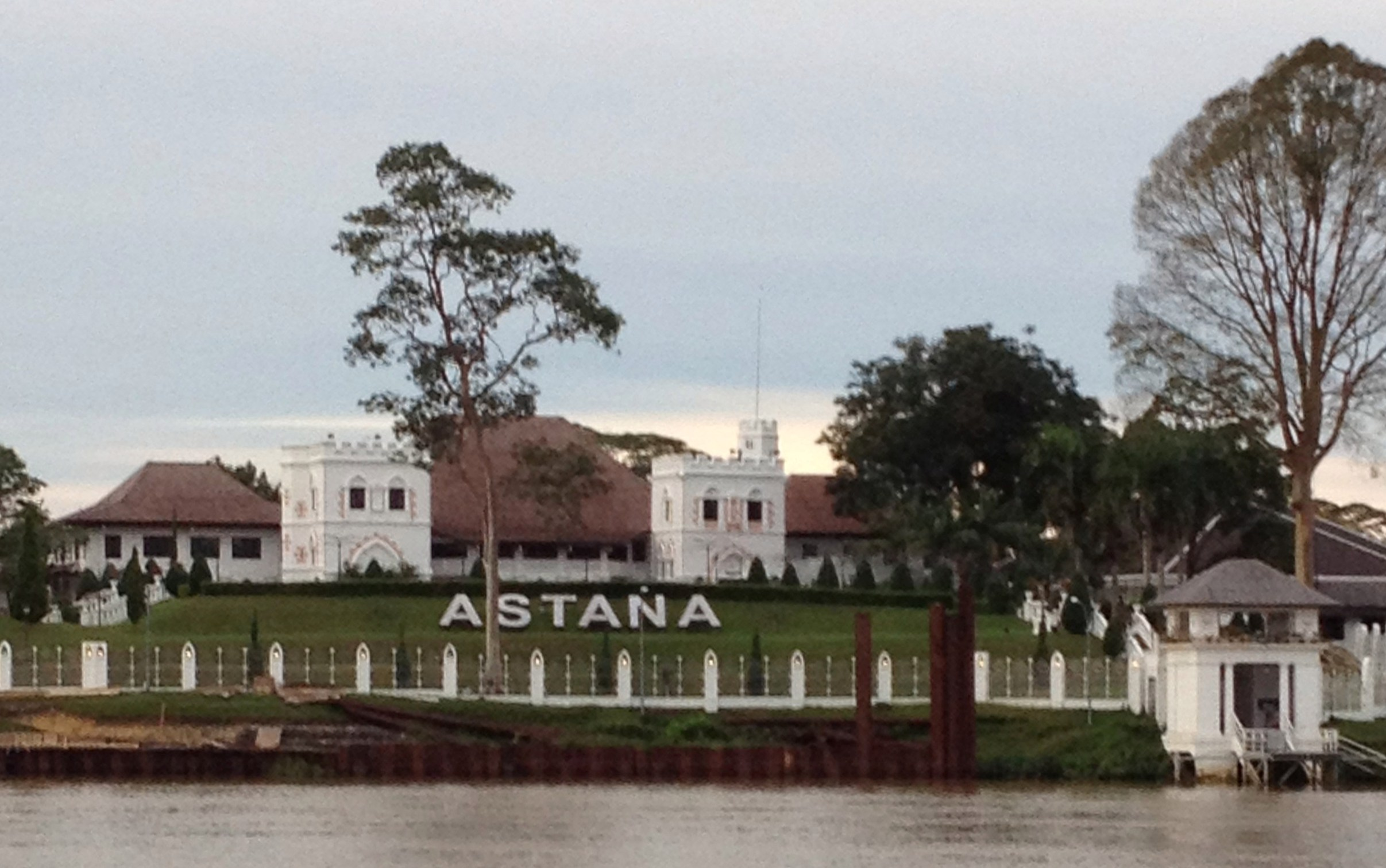
The Astana, one of the historical landmarks in the city.

Interesting historical landmarks and sites of Kuching include The Astana (the former palace of the White Rajahs and currently the official residence of the Yang di-Pertua Negeri of Sarawak), and Fort Margherita.

The oldest street of Kuching is the Main Bazaar, a row of 19th century Chinese shophouses located along the Kuching Waterfront overlooking the Sarawak River. It offers the city's best concentration of antique and handicraft shops. The Main Bazaar is part of Kuching's old town, which also includes Carpenter Street and India Street. The old Courthouse building, which sits in between Carpenter Street and India Street, has undergone major renovation and now houses the Sarawak Tourism Board complex. Some other interesting areas around the central business district include Padungan Street, which is the Chinatown of Kuching. In 2014, calls for the Historic Monuments of Kuching's inclusion in the world heritage list were made public. In 2017, a study was conducted on the possibility of Kuching to be nominated in the world heritage list.

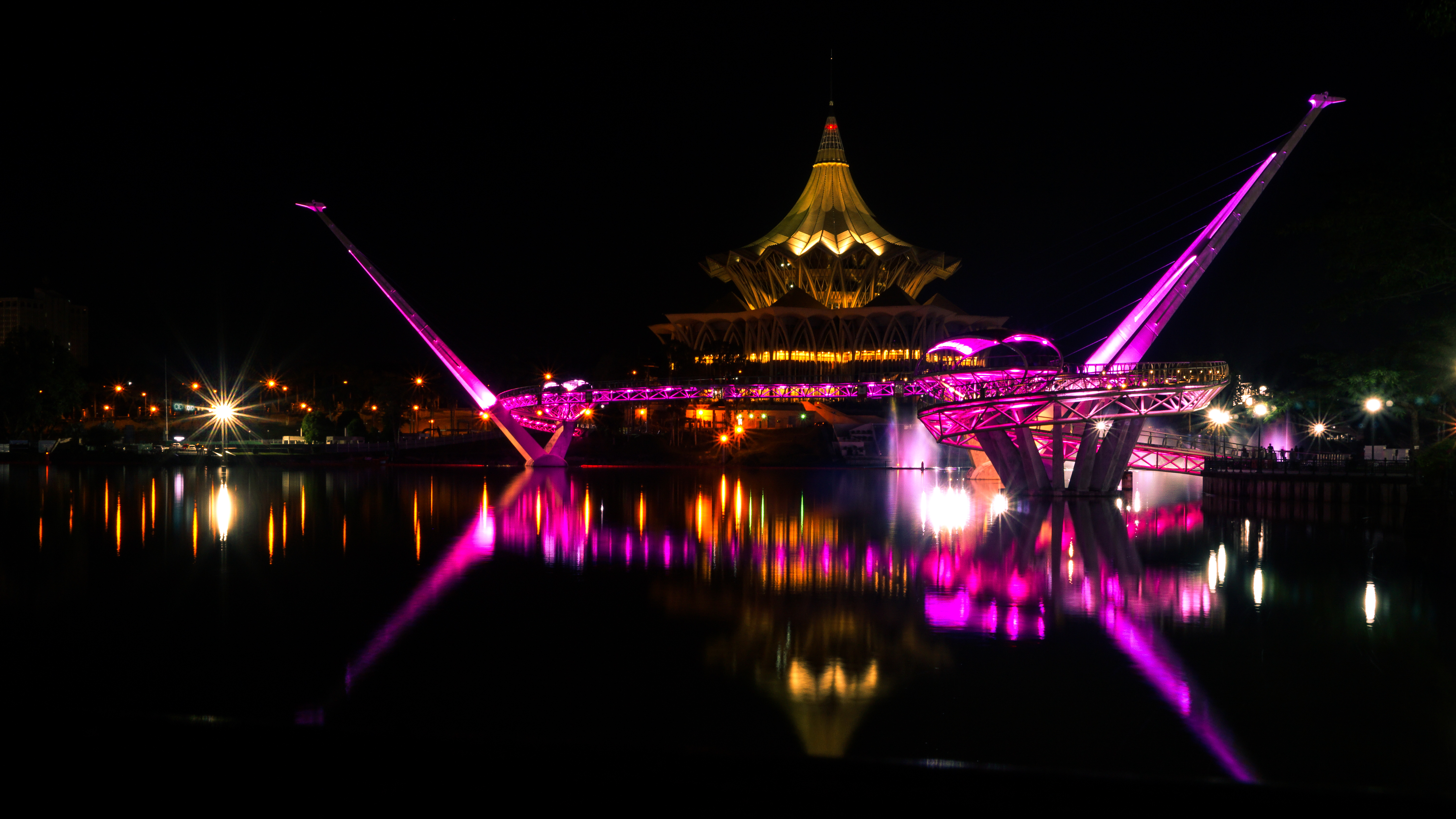
Darul Hana Bridge at night

==== Leisure and conservation areas ====
A number of leisure spots and conservation areas can be found in Kuching. The Talang-Satang National Park was established with the primary aim of conserving Sarawak's marine turtle population. It covers a total area of approximately 19,400 hectares (47,938 acres), and comprises all lands below the high tide marks on the respective islands. The park also comprises the coastline and sea surrounding four islands of the southwest coast of Sarawak; Talang Besar, Talang Kecil off Sematan, and Satang Besar and Satang Kecil off Santubong, near Kuching. These four "Turtle Islands" are responsible for 95% of all the turtle landings in Sarawak and the park also includes the Tukong Ara-Banun Island Wildlife Sanctuary, two tiny islets which are important nesting sites for colonies of bridled terns and black-naped terns.

Damai, one of Sarawak's main beach resort area, is located on the Santubong Peninsula, about 35 minutes drive from Kuching. The area has sandy beaches at the foot of an imposing jungle-covered mountain. Damai features three world-class resort hotels such as the Damai Beach Resort, Damai Puri Resort and Spa and Century Santubong Beach Resort. Each resort has their own private beach, swimming pool and offers jet-skiing, waterskiing, windsurfing, mountain biking, tennis, squash and fitness centres. There is also an international standard 18-hole golf course designed by the legendary Arnold Palmer located nearby. Other attractions include the Damai Central, Permai Rainforest Resort, Sarawak Cultural Village and the sleepy fishing villages of Santubong and Buntal with their excellent seafood restaurants. While for visitors who like adventurous activities, there is a trekking activity on Mount Santubong.

Aside from that, Damai is also one of the places in Sarawak to see the Irrawaddy dolphin as the mammals can be spotted along the Salak River, Santubong estuary and at the Bako-Buntal Bay. The Santubong Peninsula offers a few sites for bird watching with the BirdLife International Organisation has registered the whole area on Bako-Buntal Bay as an 'Important Bird Area'. Between October and March, the Buntal River becomes an important wintering ground for bird migration. Birds which have been spotted by the Malaysian Nature Society (Kuching Branch) at Buntal include a variety of plovers, sandpipers, egrets, terns, and other rare migrants, while resident birds include collared kingfisher, the white-bellied sea eagle, and brahminy kite.

National parks in Kuching include the Bako National Park and the Kuching Wetlands National Park as well as the Semenggoh Wildlife Centre which operates an orangutan orphanage and rehabilitation program. Also available near Kuching are the Gunung Gading National Park and the Kubah National Park. Located about 40-minutes drive from Kuching is Santubong, a prominent beach resort area home to numerous world-class beach resorts. Other beaches near Kuching are the Lundu Beach and the Sematan Beach. The Borneo Highlands Resort (currently closed) is also nearby, located 1000-metres above sea level.

==== Other sights ====
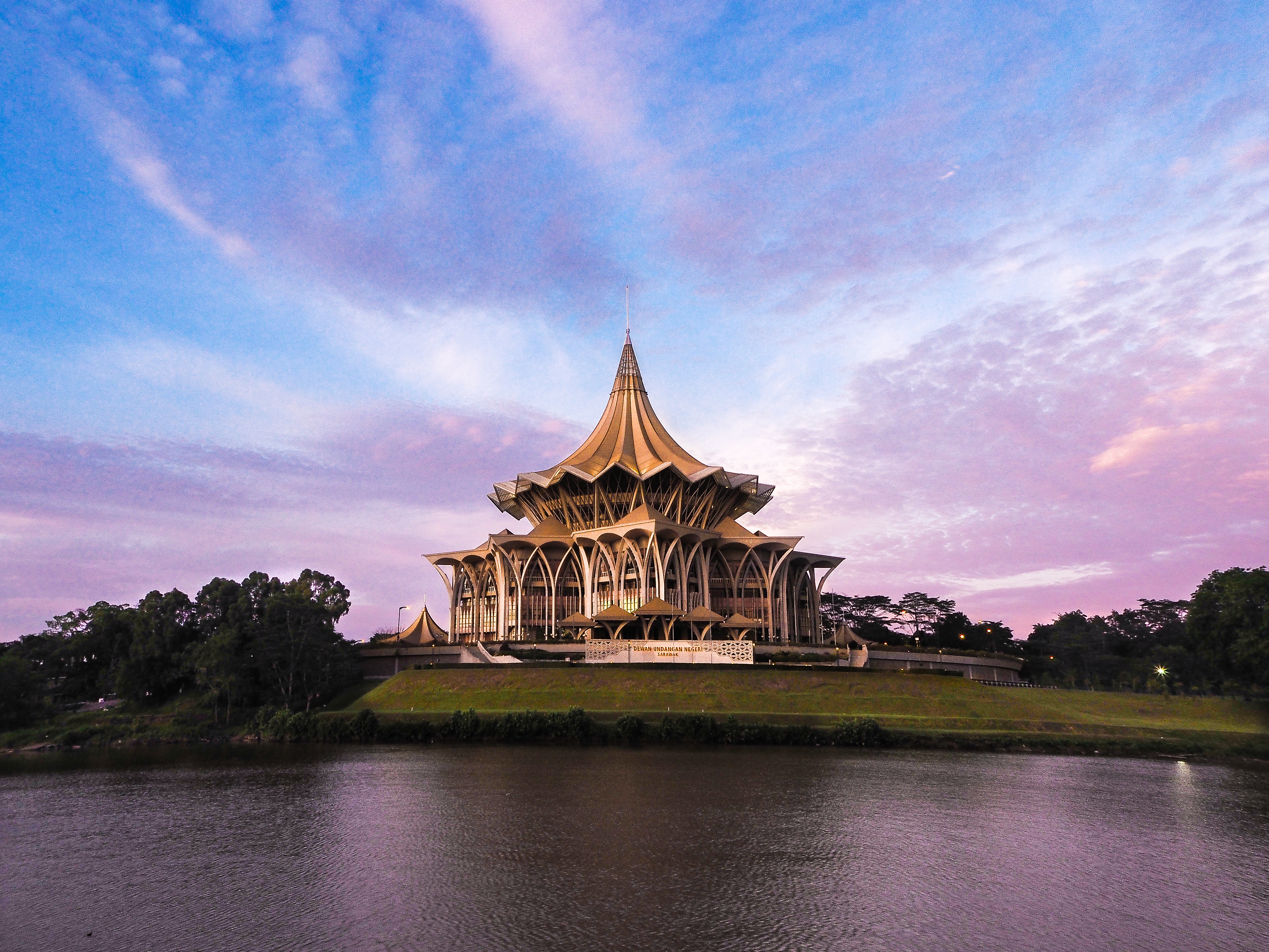
New Sarawak State Legislative Assembly Building.

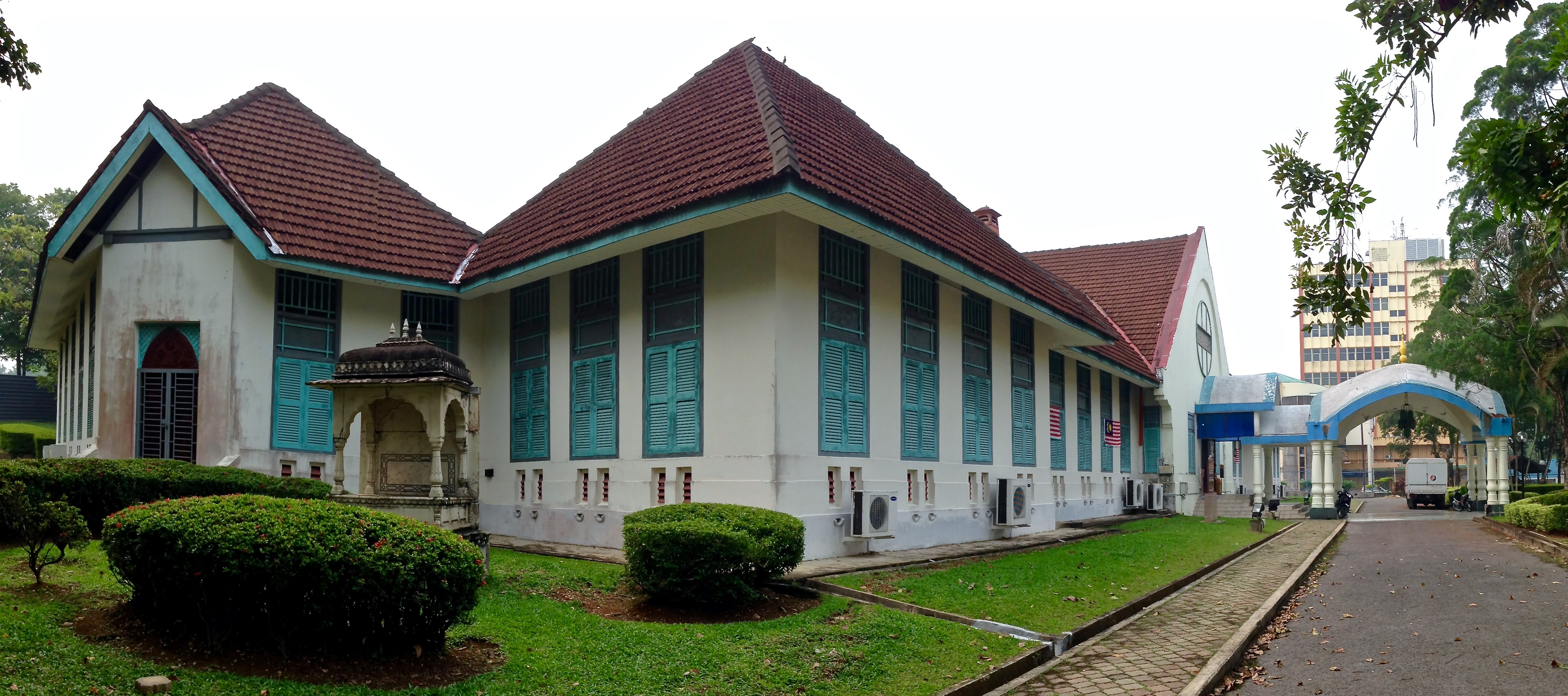
Former Madrasah Melayu Kuching (which is now as Islamic Heritage Museum).

The Kuching Waterfront is a 2 kilometre long riverside esplanade stretching from the main hotel and commercial heartland of the city to downtown Kuching. Designed by Sydney architects, the waterfront landscaped is served with food stalls, restaurants, benches and offers an excellent views of the Astana, Fort Margherita, Indian Mosque and the New Sarawak State Legislative Assembly Building. The waterfront also features an observation tower, an open-air theatre and musical fountains.

The Kuching Orangutan Murals are vital images of a wheelbarrow filled with eight young orangutans and another baby orangutan swinging from a pipe. It was painted by Ernest Zacharevic along Power Street in the city on 27 April 2014. This latest mural is painted in Zacharevic's usual interactive style, with an actual wheelbarrow sliced into half and secured to the wall to enable the public to take selfies while holding onto the handle. On the other hand, the baby orangutan was painted over a nail on the wall, where people can 'place' items in its hand.

==== Sport ====
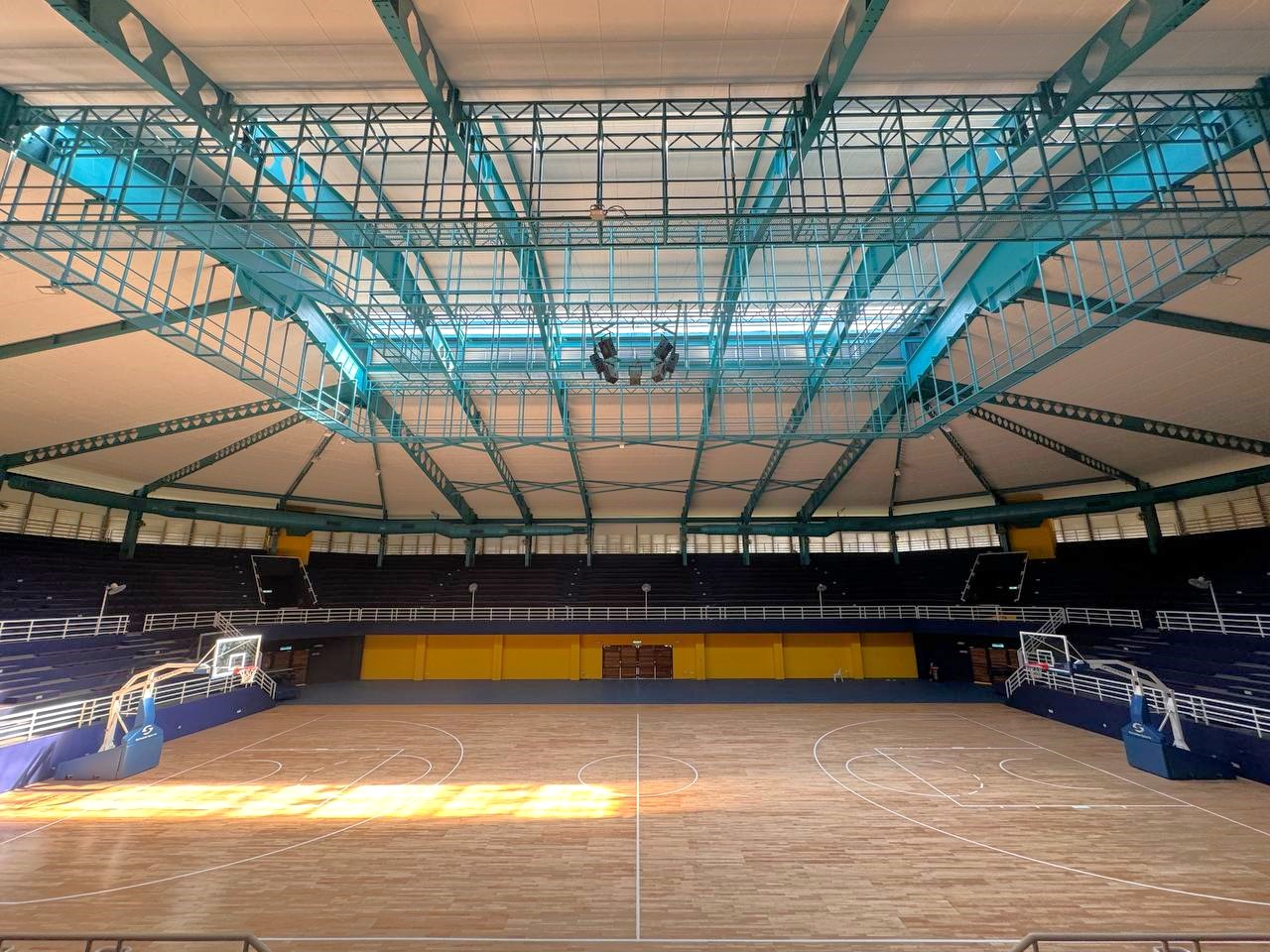
MBKS Stadium in Bintawa.

In football, Kuching is represented by Kuching City F.C., who plays at Sarawak State Stadium and Sarawak United F.C., who plays at Sarawak Stadium.

The Sarawak International Dragon Boat Regatta is an annual boat race that takes place on the Sarawak River in Kuching, Malaysia. The event is part of the larger, historic Sarawak Regatta, which was established in 1872 to promote peace and resolve intertribal conflicts.

==== Shopping ====
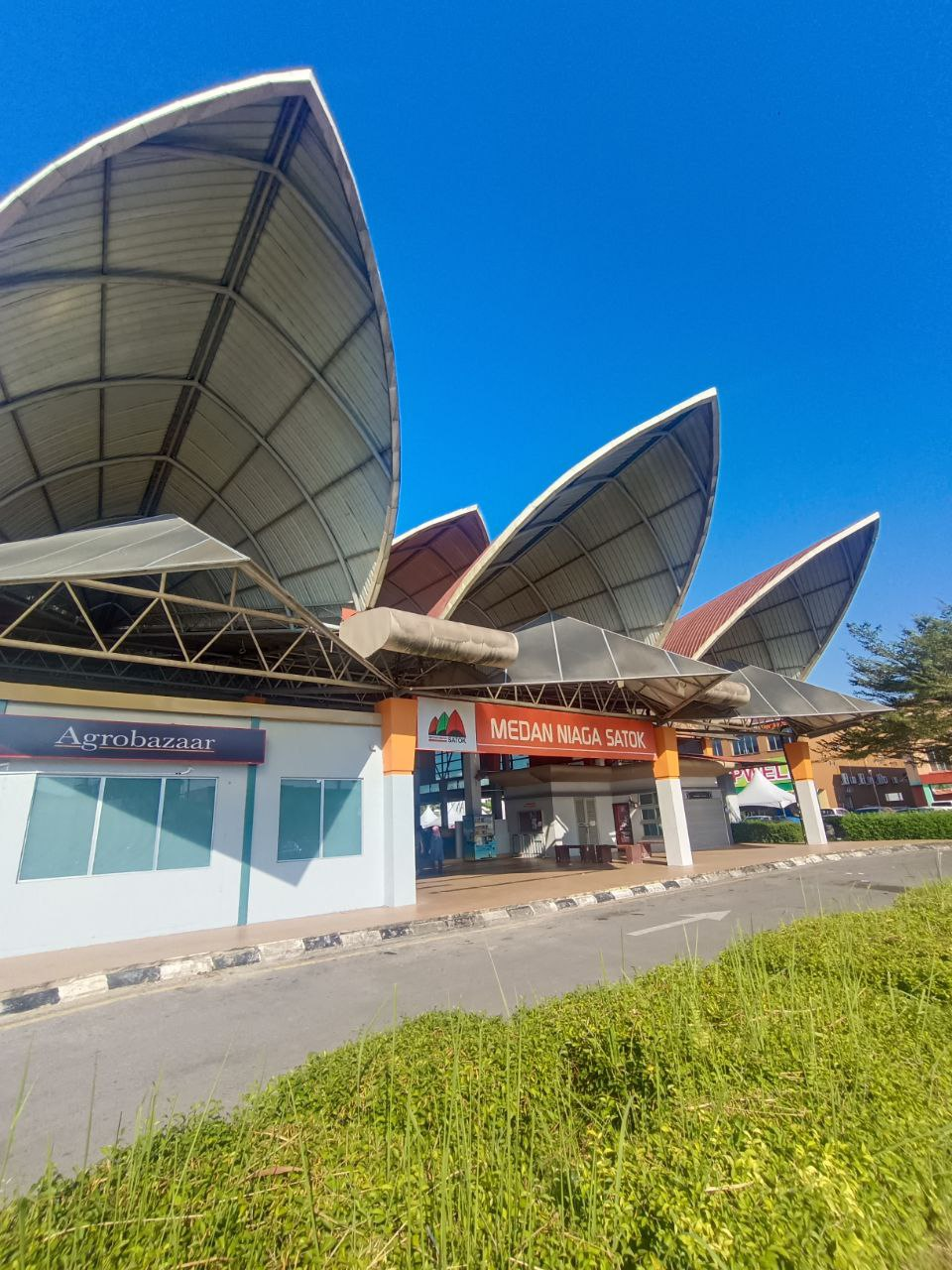
Medan Niaga Satok.

Kuching features a number of shopping malls. These include VivaCity Megamall, AEON Mall Kuching Central, The Spring, Plaza Merdeka, Farley Mall, CityONE Megamall, Kuching Sentral, Emart Lee Ling, Emart Batu Kawa, Emart Tabuan Jaya, Eco Mall, MetroMall, Aeroville Mall, Eastern Mall, Matang Mall, Sarawak Plaza, Riverside Shopping Complex, Majma' Mall, Moyan Square, Genesis Parade, Green Heights Mall, Wisma Saberkas, and many more. More shopping malls are set to open in the city as construction continues. The Satok Weekend Market is located at Medan Niaga Satok and operated in Saturdays and Sundays. A varieties of vegetables and fruits can be found there including other handicrafts, forest produce (such as wild honey), orchid plants, and a whole range of local snacks and delicacies.

==== Entertainment ====
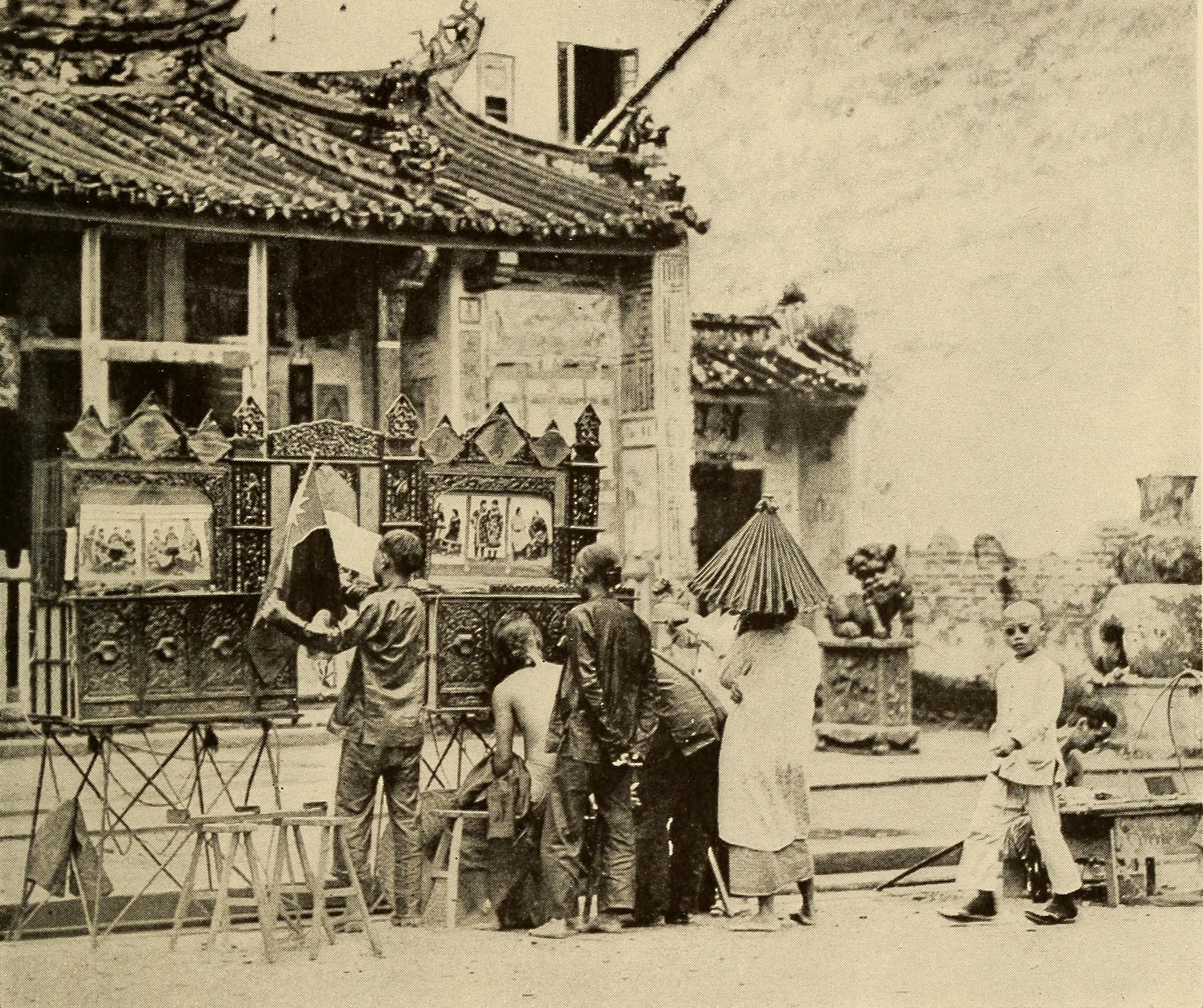
A puppet show in Kuching, c. 1919.

There are five cinemas located around the city, most of them located inside shopping mall buildings (The Spring, CityONE, VivaCity, Riverside, Summer Mall). Most of the cinemas are owned by either Golden Screen Cinemas, MBO Cinemas, TGV Cinemas and mmCineplexes. Bookaroo, a children's literature festival, has been travelling from India to Kuching every year since 2016 and takes place in April to feature the Bookaroo Kuching Fest. The festival invites authors, illustrators, storytellers, and performers from all over the world, urging children to bring books with them.

=== Music ===
Since 1997, Kuching has been host to the Rainforest World Music Festival (RWMF), an annual music festival which brings performers and spectators to the region from all over the world. Hosted by the Sarawak Cultural Village near the Mount Santubong, the festival is now one of the largest musical events in Malaysia. RWMF had been voted as Top 25 Best International Festivals by the British-based magazine Songlines.

=== Radio stations ===
Music radio station set up in Sarawak is Radio Klasik FM (87.6), Nasional FM (88.1), Sarawak FM (88.9), TraXX FM (89.9), Ai FM (90.7), Cats FM (99.3), Hot FM (94.3), Hitz (95.3), Era (96.1), My (96.9), Mix (97.7), One FM (98.3), Lite Sarawak (100.1), Bernama Radio (100.9), Sinar (102.1) and Melody (103.7).

== International relations ==
Several countries have set up their consulates in Kuching, including Australia, Brunei, China, Denmark, France, Indonesia, Poland and the United Kingdom.

=== Sister cities ===
Kuching's sister cities are:

- Jeddah, Saudi Arabia
- Johor Bahru, Malaysia
- Kunming, China
- Pontianak, Indonesia
- Denpasar, Indonesia

=== Friendly cities ===
In addition to its sister cities, Kuching has friendly relations with:

- Dali, China
- Guro, South Korea
- Singkawang, Indonesia

== See also ==
- Tua Pek Kong Temple, Kuching
- Archdiocese of Kuching
- Kuching Heroes' Cemetery
- List of roads in Kuching
