= List of federal roads in Sarawak =

This is a list of federal roads in Sarawak.

== Main federal roads ==
Highway shield	Name	From – To	Name of road	Division
FT 1	Federal Route 1	Sematan – Lawas	Pan Borneo Highway	
FT 1-1	Federal Route 1 Section 1	Sematan – Perigi Junction	Jalan Lundu–Sematan	Kuching
FT 1-2	Federal Route 1 Section 2	Perigi Junction - Biawak Junction	Jalan Lundu–Sematan	Kuching
FT 1-3	Federal Route 1 Section 3	Biawak Junction - Batang Kayan	Jalan Lundu–Sematan	Kuching
FT 1-4	Federal Route 1 Section 4	Batang Kayan - Selampit Junction	Jalan Bau–Lundu	Kuching
FT 1-5	Federal Route 1 Section 5	Selampit Junction - Bokah Junction	Jalan Bau–Lundu	Kuching
FT 1-6	Federal Route 1 Section 6	Bokah Junction - Sg. Topah	Jalan Bau–Lundu	Kuching
FT 1-7	Federal Route 1 Section 7	Sg. Topah - Bau / Tondong Junction	Jalan Bau–Lundu	Kuching
FT 1-8	Federal Route 1 Section 8	Bau / Tondong Junction - Kampung Pinang Junction	Jalan Batu Kawa–Tondong	Kuching
FT 1-9	Federal Route 1 Section 9	Kampung Pinang Junction - Sg. Sarawak (Batu Kawa)	Jalan Batu Kawa–Tondong	Kuching
FT 1-10	Federal Route 1 Section 10	Batang Sarawak(Batu Kawa) - Mile 3 Roundabout	Jalan Batu Kawa	Kuching
	Federal Route 1 Section 11A	Mile 3 Roundabout - Jtn. Jalan Datuk Bandar Mustapha	Jalan Datuk Tawi Sli	Kuching
	Federal Route 1 Section 11B1	Mile 3 Roundabout - JKR Depot	Jalan Datuk Amar Kalong Ningkan (Southbound)	Kuching
	Federal Route 1 Section 11B2	JKR Depot - Mile 3 Roundabout	Jalan Datuk Amar Kalong Ningkan (Northbound)	Kuching
	Federal Route 1 Section 12A	Mile 6 Roundabout - M 10 K/S Road (UP)	Jalan Penrissen (Southbound)	Kuching
	Federal Route 1 Section 12B	M 10 K/S Road - Mile 6 Roundabout (DOWN)	Jalan Penrissen (Northbound)	Kuching
FT 1-13	Federal Route 1 Section 13	Mile 10 (End Dual cw) - Sg. Du'uh	Jalan Kuching–Serian	Kuching
FT 1-14	Federal Route 1 Section 14	Sg. Du'uh - Kuching / Samarahan Boundary	Jalan Kuching–Serian	Kuching
FT 1-15	Federal Route 1 Section 15	Kuching / Samarahan Boundary - Sg. Mamat	Jalan Kuching–Serian	Samarahan
FT 1-16	Federal Route 1 Section 16	Sg. Mamat - Serian Roundabout	Jalan Kuching–Serian	Samarahan
	Federal Route 1 Section 17A	Serian Roundabout - Sg. Sadong Bridge	Jalan Bandar Serian	Samarahan
	Federal Route 1 Section 17B	Sg. Sadong Bridge - Gedong Junction	Jalan Sri Aman–Serian	Samarahan
	Federal Route 1 Section 18	Gedong Junction - Kampung Limau Junction	Jalan Sri Aman–Serian	Samarahan
	Federal Route 1 Section 19	Kampung Limau Junction - Sg. Karang	Jalan Sri Aman–Serian	Samarahan
	Federal Route 1 Section 20	Sg. Karang - Sg. Stabau	Jalan Sri Aman–Serian	Samarahan
	Federal Route 1 Section 21	Sg. Stabau - Samarahan/ Sri Aman Boundary	Jalan Sri Aman–Serian	Samarahan
	Federal Route 1 Section 22	Samarahan / Sri Aman Boundary - Pantu Junction	Jalan Sri Aman–Sarikei	Sri Aman
	Federal Route 1 Section 23	Pantu Junction - Lachau Junction	Jalan Sri Aman–Sarikei	Sri Aman
	Federal Route 1 Section 24	Lachau Junction - Sg. Engkramut	Jalan Sri Aman–Sarikei	Sri Aman
	Federal Route 1 Section 25	Sg. Engkramut - Sri Aman Junction	Jalan Sri Aman–Sarikei	Sri Aman
	Federal Route 1 Section 26	Sri Aman Junction - Batu Lintang Junction	Jalan Sri Aman–Sarikei	Sri Aman
	Federal Route 1 Section 27	Batu Lintang Junction - Engkilili Junction	Jalan Sri Aman–Sarikei	Sri Aman
	Federal Route 1 Section 28	Engkilili Junction - Lubok Antu Junction	Jalan Sri Aman–Sarikei	Sri Aman
	Federal Route 1 Section 29	Lubok Antu - Batang Skrang	Jalan Sri Aman–Sarikei	Sri Aman
	Federal Route 1 Section 30	Batang Skrang - Betong Junction	Jalan Sri Aman–Sarikei	Sri Aman
	Federal Route 1 Section 31	Betong Junction - Batang Layar	Jalan Sri Aman–Sarikei	Betong
	Federal Route 01-10	Batang Layar - Sg. Paku	Jalan Sri Aman–Sarikei	Betong
	Federal Route 01-10	Sg. Paku - Sg. Rimbas	Jalan Sri Aman–Sarikei	Betong
	Federal Route 01-10	Sg. Rimbas - Pusa Junction	Jalan Sri Aman–Sarikei	Betong
	Federal Route 01-10	Pusa Junction - Sg. Krian	Jalan Sri Aman–Sarikei	Betong
	Federal Route 01-10	Sg. Krian - Saratok Junction	Jalan Sri Aman–Sarikei	Betong
	Federal Route 01-10	Saratok Junction - Roban Junction	Jalan Sri Aman–Sarikei	Betong
	Federal Route 01-10	Roban Junction - Sri Aman / Sarikei Boundary	Jalan Sri Aman–Sarikei	Betong
	Federal Route 01-10	Sri Aman / Sarikei Boundary - Bayong Junction	Jalan Sibu–Sarikei	Sarikei
	Federal Route 01-10	Bayong Junction - Sarikei Junction	Jalan Sibu–Sarikei	Sarikei
	Federal Route 01-41	Sarikei Junction - Sg. Nyelong	Jalan Sibu–Sarikei	Sarikei
	Federal Route 01-10	Sg. Nyelong - Bintangor Junction	Jalan Sibu–Sarikei	Sarikei
	Federal Route 01-10	Bintangor Junction - Sg. Mador	Jalan Sibu–Sarikei	Sarikei
	Federal Route 01-10	Sg. Mador - Sg. Jikang	Jalan Sibu–Sarikei	Sarikei
	Federal Route 01-10	Sg. Jikang - Kanowit Junction	Jalan Sibu–Sarikei	Sarikei
	Federal Route 01-10	Kanowit Junction - Durin Ferry Point	Jalan Sibu–Sarikei	Sibu
	Federal Route 01-10	Durin Ferry Point - Sibu Junction (M 12 Junction)	Jalan Sibu–Sarikei	Sibu
	Federal Route 01-10	Sibu Junction (M 12 Junction ) - Sg. Pasai	Jalan Sibu–Bintulu	Sibu
	Federal Route 01-10	Sg. Pasai - Btg. Oya	Jalan Sibu–Bintulu	Sibu
	Federal Route 01-10	Btg. Oya - Bukit Singalang	Jalan Sibu–Bintulu	Sibu
	Federal Route 01-10	Bukit Singalang - Btg. Mukah	Jalan Sibu–Bintulu	Sibu
	Federal Route 01-10	Btg. Mukah - Sg. Buluh	Jalan Sibu–Bintulu	Sibu
	Federal Route 01-10	Sg. Buluh - Btg. Balingian	Jalan Sibu–Bintulu	Sibu
	Federal Route 01-10	Btg. Balingian - Kemena Junction	Jalan Sibu–Bintulu	Sibu
	Federal Route 01-10	Kemena Junction - Sg. Arip Bridge End	Jalan Sibu–Bintulu	Sibu
	Federal Route 01-10	Sg. Arip - Sibu / Bintulu Boundary	Jalan Sibu–Bintulu	Bintulu
	Federal Route 01-10	Sibu / Bintulu Boundary - Batang Tatau	Jalan Sibu–Bintulu	Bintulu
	Federal Route 01-10	Batang Tatau - Sg. Semanok	Jalan Sibu–Bintulu	Bintulu
	Federal Route 01-10	Sg. Semanok - Sg. Selad	Jalan Sibu–Bintulu	Bintulu
	Federal Route 01-10	Sg. Selad - Batang Kemena	Jalan Sibu–Bintulu	Bintulu
	Federal Route 01-10	Batang Kemena - Bintulu Junction	Jalan Sibu–Bintulu	Bintulu
	Federal Route 01-10	Bintulu Junction - Sg. Sibiu No.2	Jalan Miri–Bintulu	Bintulu
	Federal Route 01-10	Nyabau Jnt. (end of single CW) - Bintulu Jnt.	Jalan Miri–Bintulu	Bintulu
	Federal Route 01-10	Sg. Sibiu No.2 - Sg. Sibiu No.3	Jalan Miri–Bintulu	Bintulu
	Federal Route 01-10	Sg. Sibiu No.3 - Mile 22 Quarry Junction	Jalan Miri–Bintulu	Bintulu
	Federal Route 01-10	Mile 22 Quarry junction - Sg. Similajau	Jalan Miri–Bintulu	Bintulu
	Federal Route 01-10	Sg. Similajau - Rumah Lankan	Jalan Miri–Bintulu	Bintulu
	Federal Route 01-10	Rumah Lankan - Bintulu / Miri Boundary	Jalan Miri–Bintulu	Bintulu
	Federal Route 01-10	Bintulu / Miri Boundary - Sg. Suai	Jalan Miri–Bintulu	Bintulu
	Federal Route 01-10	Sg. Suai - Telabit Junction	Jalan Miri–Bintulu	Miri
	Federal Route 01-10	Telabit Junction - Niah Junction	Jalan Miri–Bintulu	Miri
	Federal Route 01-10	Niah junction - Subis 2 Junction	Jalan Miri–Bintulu	Miri
	Federal Route 01-10	Subis 2 Junction - Karabungan Junction	Jalan Miri–Bintulu	Miri
	Federal Route 01-10	Karabungan Junction - Sg. Bakas	Jalan Miri–Bintulu	Miri
	Federal Route 01-10	Sg. Bakas - Bekenu Junction	Jalan Miri–Bintulu	Miri
	Federal Route 01-10	Bekenu Junction - Entulang Junction	Jalan Miri–Bintulu	Miri
	Federal Route 01-10	Entulang Junction - Sg. Liku	Jalan Miri–Bintulu	Miri
	Federal Route 01-10	Sg. Liku - Sg. Rait Junction	Jalan Miri–Bintulu	Miri
	Federal Route 01-10	Sg. Rait Junction - Miri Airport Junction	Jalan Miri–Bintulu	Miri
	Federal Route 01-10	Miri Airport Junction - Puchong Roundabout	Jalan Miri–Bintulu	Miri
	Federal Route 01-10	Puchong Roundabout - Miri Airport Junction	Jalan Miri–Bintulu	Miri
	Federal Route 01-10	Puchong Roundabout - Sg. Lutong (UP)	Jalan Miri–Lutong	Miri
	Federal Route 01-10	Sg. Miri - Puchong Roundabout (DOWN)	Jalan Miri–Lutong	Miri
	Federal Route 1 Section 81	Sg. Lutong - Kuala Baram Ferry Point	Jalan Lutong–Kuala Baram	Miri
FT 1-82	Federal Route 1 Section 82	Kuala Baram Ferry Point - Sg. Tujuh Check Point	Jalan Kuala Baram–Sungai Tujuh	Miri
	Federal Route 01-10	Limbang Brunei Border (Tedungan) - Sg. Limbang	Jalan Tedungan-Limbang	Limbang
	Federal Route 01-10	Sg. Limbang Bridge - Ng. Medamit / Batu Danau Junction	Jalan Tedungan-Limbang	Limbang
	Federal Route 01-10	Ng. Medamit/Batu Danau Jnt.-Kubong/Ng. Medamit Jnt.	Jalan Tedungan-Limbang	Limbang
	Federal Route 01-10	Kubong Junction - Limbang Town (Police Station)	Jalan Limbang	Limbang
	Federal Route 01-10	Limbang Town - Limbang/Brunei Border (Temburong)	Jalan Limbang	Limbang
	Federal Route 01-10	Brunei/Lawas Border (Temburong) - Sg. Trusan	Jalan Lawas	Limbang
	Federal Route 1 Section 89	Sg. Trusan - Lawas Town	Jalan Lawas	Limbang
	Federal Route 1 Section 90	Lawas Town - Batang Lawas	Jalan Lawas	Limbang
	Federal Route 1 Section 91	Batang Lawas - Sg. Malagang	Jalan Lawas	Limbang
	Federal Route 1 Section 92	Sg. Malagang - Lawas/Sabah Border	Jalan Lawas	Limbang

== Other trunk, feeder, and access roads ==
Highway shield	Name	Name of roads/highways	Highways	Division
FT 801	Malaysia Federal Route 801	BDC Roundabout	Persimpangan Bertingkat Kenyalang; Kuching Bypass	Kuching
	Malaysia Federal Route 801-1B	BDC R/A - JKR Depot	Jalan Datuk Bandar Mustapha; Kuching Bypass	Kuching
	Malaysia Federal Route 801-2A	BDC R/A - Perpaduan R/A	Jalan Tun Jugah; Kuching Bypass	Kuching
	Malaysia Federal Route 801-2B	Perpaduan R/A - BDC R/A	Jalan Tun Jugah; Kuching Bypass	Kuching
	Malaysia Federal Route 801-2C	Simpang Tiga - Tun Jugah [UP]	Persimpangan Bertingkat Tun Jugah; Kuching Bypass	Kuching
	Malaysia Federal Route 801-2D	Tun Jugah - Simpang Tiga [DOWN]	Persimpangan Bertingkat Tun Jugah; Kuching Bypass	Kuching
	Malaysia Federal Route 801-3A	Perpaduan R/A - Rajah Court Hotel	Jalan Tun Razak; Kuching Bypass	Kuching
	Malaysia Federal Route 801-3B	Rajah Court Hotel - Perpaduan R/A	Jalan Tun Razak; Kuching Bypass	Kuching
	Malaysia Federal Route 801-3C	Tun Jugah - Tun Razak	Persimpangan Bertingkat Tun Jugah; Kuching Bypass	Kuching
	Malaysia Federal Route 801-3D	Tun Razak - Tun Jugah	Persimpangan Bertingkat Tun Jugah; Kuching Bypass	Kuching
FT 901	Malaysia Federal Route 901	To Politeknik Kuching	Jalan Politeknik Kuching	Kuching
	Malaysia Federal Route 903-1	To Mount Serapi	Jalan Masuk Gunung Serapi Toposcatter Station	Kuching
	Malaysia Federal Route 903-2	To Mount Serapi	Jalan Masuk Gunung Serapi Toposcatter Station	Kuching
	Malaysia Federal Route 900A	To Kuching Airport	Jalan Lapangan Terbang Baru	Kuching
	Malaysia Federal Route 900B	To Kuching Airport (Up)	Jalan Lapangan Terbang Baru	Kuching
	Malaysia Federal Route 900C	To Kuching Airport (Down)	Jalan Lapangan Terbang Baru	Kuching
FT 802	Malaysia Federal Route 802	Mambong - Kota Samarahan	Jalan Datuk Mohammad Musa	Samarahan
	Malaysia Federal Route 802-1	Junction of Kota S'hn Town Rd. - Sg. Keranji Brdg.	Jalan Kota Samarahan Baru	Samarahan
	Malaysia Federal Route 802-2	Sg. Keranji Brdg. - Jnt. at Old Kuching/Serian Road	Jalan Kota Samarahan Baru	Samarahan
FT 21	Malaysia Federal Route 21	Serian - Tebedu - Indonesian Border Road	Tebedu Highway	Samarahan
FT 25	Malaysia Federal Route 25	Batang Ai Trunk Road	Jalan Batang Ai	Sri Aman
	Malaysia Federal Route 25-1	Jnt. with Kuch/Brunei B.T. Rd. - Btg. Lemanak Brdg.	Jalan Batang Ai	Sri Aman
	Malaysia Federal Route 25-2	Btg. Lemanak Brdg. - Junction with Btg. Ai Ring Road	Jalan Batang Ai	Sri Aman
	Malaysia Federal Route 25-3	Junction with Btg. Ai Ring Rd. - SESCO Township	Jalan Batang Ai	Sri Aman
FT 902	Malaysia Federal Route 902	Rajang Port Access Road	Jalan Pelabuhan Sibu	Sibu
	Malaysia Federal Route 902-1A	Jnt. Kpg. Nyabor - Daulat Tuanku R/A	Brooke Drive	Sibu
	Malaysia Federal Route 902-1B	Daulat Tuanku R/A - Jnt. Kpg. Nyabor	Brooke Drive	Sibu
	Malaysia Federal Route 902-2A	Daulat Tuanku R/A - M3 Oya Rd. Jnt.	Deshon Road	Sibu
	Malaysia Federal Route 902-2B	M3 Oya Rd. Jnt. - Daulat Tuanku R/A	Deshon Road	Sibu
	Malaysia Federal Route 902-3	Ulu Oya Road (M3 - M12)	Ulu Oya Road	Bintulu
FT 800	Malaysia Federal Route 800	Bintulu - Tg. Kidurong	Jalan Tanjung Kidurong	Bintulu
	Malaysia Federal Route 800-1	Bintulu / Tatau Jnt. (Mile 5) - Bintulu Port	Jalan Tanjung Kidurong	Bintulu
	Malaysia Federal Route 800-2	Bintulu / Tatau Jnt. (Mile 5) - Bintulu Port	Jalan Tanjung Kidurong	Bintulu
Q---	Malaysia Federal Route 800-3	Bakun Jnt. - Bintulu/Kapit Border	Jalan Bakun	Bintulu
Q---	Malaysia Federal Route 800-4	Bintulu/Kapit Border - Bakun	Jalan Bakun	Kapit
	Malaysia Federal Route ---	Sibu - Tanjung Manis	Sibu-Tanjung Manis Highway	Sibu
FT 919	Malaysia Federal Route 919	Jalan Lapangan Terbang Baru Sibu		Sibu
FT 920	Malaysia Federal Route 920	Jalan Lapangan Terbang Baru Bintulu		Bintulu
FT 3101	Malaysia Federal Route 3101	Durin - Kanowit		Sibu
