= Malaysia Federal Route 1 (Sarawak) =

Road in Sarawak, Malaysia

Federal Route 1
- Pan Borneo Highway Sarawak (Sarawak First Trunk Road)

Route information
- Part of AH150
- Maintained by Malaysian Public Works Department
- Length: 1,077.1 km (669.3 mi)
- Existed: 2013–present
- History: Completed in 2024

Major junctions
- West end: Telok Melano
- East end: FT 1 Malaysia Federal Route 1 (Sabah) in Merapok

Section 1
- West end: Sematan
- Major intersections: FT 21 Tebedu Highway; FT 25 Batang Ai Highway; FT 800 Jalan Tanjung Kidurong; FT 801 Kuching Bypass; FT 803 Bakun Highway
- East end: Sungai Tujoh

Section 2
- West end: Kuala Lurah
- East end: Pandaruan

Section 3
- West end: Mengkalap
- East end: FT 1 Malaysia Federal Route 1 (Sabah) in Merapok

Location
- Country: Malaysia
- Primary destinations: Kuching; Serian, Sri Aman, Sarikei, Sibu, Bintulu, Limbang

Highway system
- Highways in Malaysia; Expressways; Federal; State

The Sarawak section of the Federal Route 1, Asian Highway Route AH 150, also known as Pan Borneo Highway Sarawak or Sarawak First Trunk Road, is a 1077-km federal highway in Sarawak, Malaysia, making the highway as the longest component of the Malaysian portion of the larger Pan Borneo Highway network. Construction of the highway began in 2014 after the Sarawak government was under pressure, due to a lack of proper road connectivity within the State, despite having been in the Federation of Malaysia for 51 years, and the Federal Government profiting from resource extraction in Sarawak.

The combined length of the Pan Borneo Highway Sarawak and its Sabahan counterpart forms the longest federal highway in Malaysia, with the total length of 1,503 km.

The Pan Borneo Highway Sarawak is notable for having three separate segments, sandwiched by two segments of Bruneian Pan-Borneo Highway. The Federal Route 1 was built in sections, comprising 92 sections altogether. Generally, all other federal and state highways in Sarawak serve as tributaries of the Federal Route 1. The highway is the only east-west oriented highway in Sarawak and links most of the division capitals in Sarawak except Kapit and Mukah. The sections from Miri to Limbang and to Lawas are connected by Brunei highway networks. At the Sarawak-Sabah border at Merapok, motorists must pass an immigration checkpoint to enter Sabah and vice versa. The highway continues as Malaysia Federal Route 1 (Sabah) in Sindumin.

== History ==
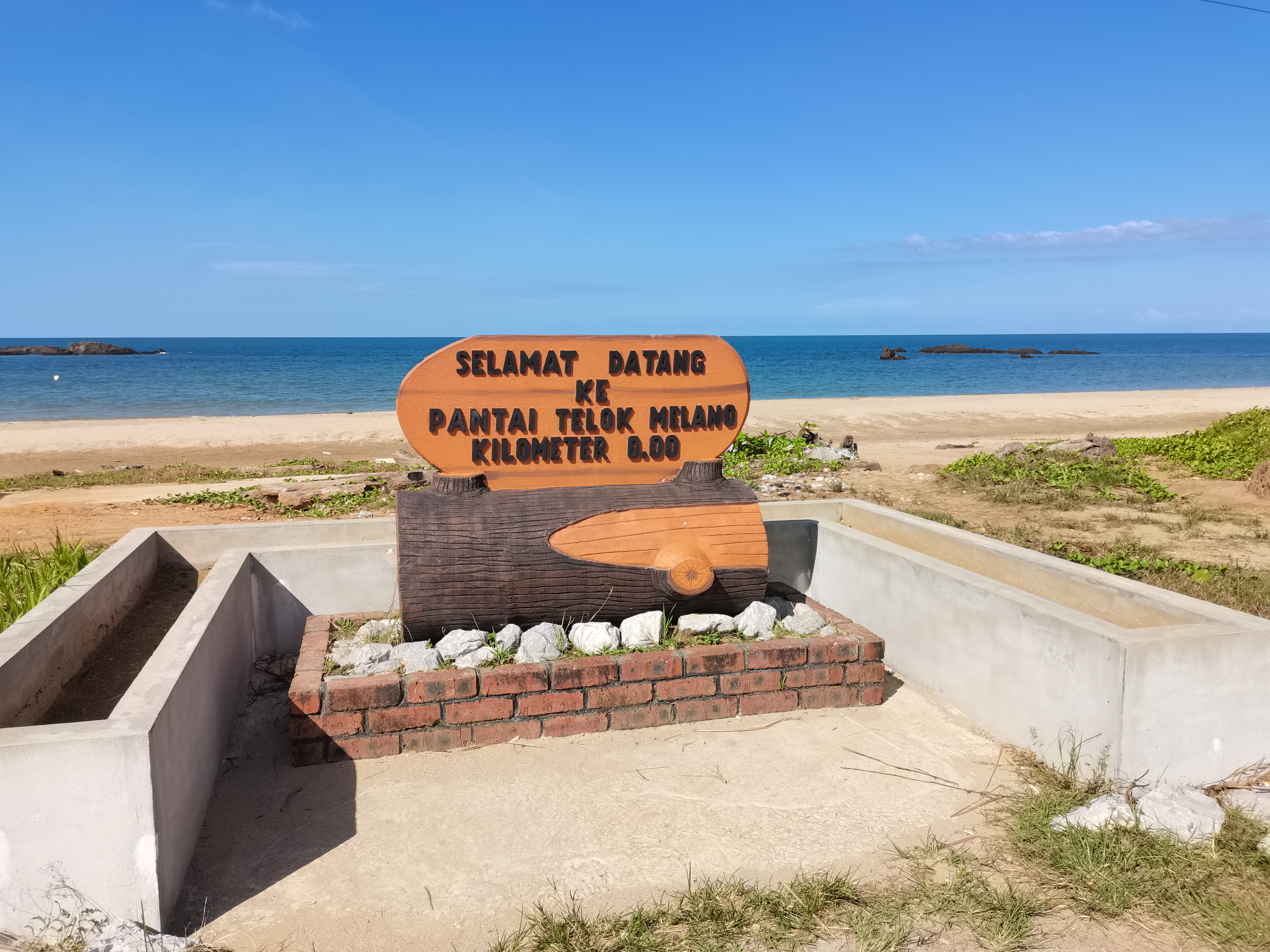
Telok Melano, the starting point of Pan Borneo Highway.

The Sarawak Pan-Borneo Highway was built due to the lack of the intercity highway network in Sarawak. Initially, the intercity highway plan in Sarawak only existed after the Second World War ended in 1945, after Sarawak was ceded to Britain to become a British Crown Colony.

The construction of the first intercity trunk highway in Sarawak was commenced in 1965, dubbed as the "First Trunk Road". Most of the highway network in Sarawak was constructed within the decades of 1960s to 1980s. The Lawas–Merapok–Sindumin section was completed in 1981 while the final missing link from Sibu to Bintulu was completed in 1985. However, the highway had not been fully paved with asphalt yet at that time; it was only by the end of Sixth Malaysia Plan (RMK6) in 1995 that the FT1 highway in Sarawak was fully paved.

Before 1996, all routes in the Pan-Borneo Highway network in Malaysia, including Sarawak Pan-Borneo Highway, were state highways. After the Federal Roads Act 1959 was made effective in Sabah and Sarawak in 1984, those highways were re-gazetted as federal highways in 1996 with the route number of FT1 (from Sematan to Kudat through Brunei), FT13 (Mile 32 Sandakan to Tawau) and FT22 (Tamparuli to Sandakan). Those highways were later gazetted as a part of Asian Highway Network Route AH150.

Although some sections had been upgraded to divided highways, the Sarawak Pan-Borneo Highway was notorious for its poor condition in many sections. The overall condition in many sections of the Malaysian section of the Highway was poor with many potholes, because most sections of the highway were built with standards as low as JKR R3 (design speed limit: 70 km/h; minimum lane width: 3.0 m). A study to upgrade the entire highway to a super two highway under JKR R5 standard (design speed limit: 100 km/h; minimum lane width: 3.5 m) was done, which was expected to cost RM16 billion. Ultimately, the Malaysian federal government had opted to upgrade the Pan-Borneo Highway to a divided highway. The upgrade works of the Sarawak Pan-Borneo Highway to a divided highway is expected to be completed by 2023, with the overall cost of RM27 billion including its Sabahan counterparts.

== Sections of the Federal Route 1 in Sarawak ==
There are 93 sections that form the entire Federal Route 1 in Sarawak:

Name	From – To	Name of Road	Division
Federal Route 1	Telok Melano – Sematan	Jalan Sematan–Telok Melano	Kuching
Federal Route 1 Section 1	Sematan – Perigi Junction	Jalan Lundu–Sematan	Kuching
Federal Route 1 Section 2	Perigi Junction - Biawak Junction	Jalan Lundu–Sematan	Kuching
Federal Route 1 Section 3	Biawak Junction - Batang Kayan	Jalan Lundu–Sematan	Kuching
Federal Route 1 Section 4	Batang Kayan - Selampit Junction	Jalan Bau–Lundu	Kuching
Federal Route 1 Section 5	Selampit Junction - Bokah Junction	Jalan Bau–Lundu	Kuching
Federal Route 1 Section 6	Bokah Junction - Sg. Topah	Jalan Bau–Lundu	Kuching
Federal Route 1 Section 7	Sg. Topah - Bau / Tondong Junction	Jalan Bau–Lundu	Kuching
Federal Route 1 Section 8	Bau / Tondong Junction - Kampung Pinang Junction	Jalan Batu Kawa–Tondong	Kuching
Federal Route 1 Section 9	Kampung Pinang Junction - Sg. Sarawak (Batu Kawa)	Jalan Batu Kawa–Tondong	Kuching
Federal Route 1 Section 10	Batang Sarawak(Batu Kawa) - Mile 3 Roundabout	Jalan Batu Kawa	Kuching
Federal Route 1 Section 11A	Mile 3 Roundabout - Jtn. Jalan Datuk Bandar Mustapha	Jalan Datuk Tawi Sli	Kuching
Federal Route 1 Section 11B1	Mile 3 Roundabout - JKR Depot	Jalan Datuk Amar Kalong Ningkan (Southbound)	Kuching
Federal Route 1 Section 11B2	JKR Depot - Mile 3 Roundabout	Jalan Datuk Amar Kalong Ningkan (Northbound)	Kuching
Federal Route 1 Section 12A	Mile 6 Roundabout - M 10 K/S Road (UP)	Jalan Penrissen (Southbound)	Kuching
Federal Route 1 Section 12B	M 10 K/S Road - Mile 6 Roundabout (DOWN)	Jalan Penrissen (Northbound)	Kuching
Federal Route 1 Section 13	Mile 10 (End Dual cw) - Sg. Du'uh	Jalan Kuching–Serian	Kuching
Federal Route 1 Section 14	Sg. Du'uh - Kuching / Samarahan Boundary	Jalan Kuching–Serian	Kuching
Federal Route 1 Section 15	Kuching / Samarahan Boundary - Sg. Mamat	Jalan Kuching–Serian	Samarahan
Federal Route 1 Section 16	Sg. Mamat - Serian Roundabout	Jalan Kuching–Serian	Samarahan
Federal Route 1 Section 17A	Serian Roundabout - Sg. Sadong Bridge	Jalan Serian Bypass	Samarahan
Federal Route 1 Section 17B	Sg. Sadong Bridge - Gedong Junction	Jalan Sri Aman–Serian	Samarahan
Federal Route 1 Section 18	Gedong Junction - Kampung Limau Junction	Jalan Sri Aman–Serian	Samarahan
Federal Route 1 Section 19	Kampung Limau Junction - Sg. Karang	Jalan Sri Aman–Serian	Samarahan
Federal Route 1 Section 20	Sg. Karang - Sg. Stabau	Jalan Sri Aman–Serian	Samarahan
Federal Route 1 Section 21	Sg. Stabau - Samarahan/ Sri Aman Boundary	Jalan Sri Aman–Serian	Samarahan
Federal Route 1 Section 22	Samarahan / Sri Aman Boundary - Pantu Junction	Jalan Sri Aman–Sarikei	Sri Aman
Federal Route 1 Section 23	Pantu Junction - Lachau Junction	Jalan Sri Aman–Sarikei	Sri Aman
Federal Route 1 Section 24	Lachau Junction - Sg. Engkramut	Jalan Sri Aman–Sarikei	Sri Aman
Federal Route 1 Section 25	Sg. Engkramut - Sri Aman Junction	Jalan Sri Aman–Sarikei	Sri Aman
Federal Route 1 Section 26	Sri Aman Junction - Batu Lintang Junction	Jalan Sri Aman–Sarikei	Sri Aman
Federal Route 1 Section 27	Batu Lintang Junction - Engkilili Junction	Jalan Sri Aman–Sarikei	Sri Aman
Federal Route 1 Section 28	Engkilili Junction - Lubok Antu Junction	Jalan Sri Aman–Sarikei	Sri Aman
Federal Route 1 Section 29	Lubok Antu - Batang Skrang	Jalan Sri Aman–Sarikei	Sri Aman
Federal Route 1 Section 30	Batang Skrang - Betong Junction	Jalan Sri Aman–Sarikei	Sri Aman
Federal Route 1 Section 31	Betong Junction - Batang Layar	Jalan Sri Aman–Sarikei	Betong
—	Batang Layar - Sg. Paku	Jalan Sri Aman–Sarikei	Betong
—	Sg. Paku - Sg. Rimbas	Jalan Sri Aman–Sarikei	Betong
—	Sg. Rimbas - Pusa Junction	Jalan Sri Aman–Sarikei	Betong
—	Pusa Junction - Sg. Krian	Jalan Sri Aman–Sarikei	Betong
—	Sg. Krian - Saratok Junction	Jalan Sri Aman–Sarikei	Betong
—	Saratok Junction - Roban Junction	Jalan Sri Aman–Sarikei	Betong
—	Roban Junction - Sri Aman / Sarikei Boundary	Jalan Sri Aman–Sarikei	Betong
—	Sri Aman / Sarikei Boundary - Bayong Junction	Jalan Sibu–Sarikei	Sarikei
—	Bayong Junction - Sarikei Junction	Jalan Sibu–Sarikei	Sarikei
—	Sarikei Junction - Sg. Nyelong	Jalan Sibu–Sarikei	Sarikei
—	Sg. Nyelong - Bintangor Junction	Jalan Sibu–Sarikei	Sarikei
—	Bintangor Junction - Sg. Mador	Jalan Sibu–Sarikei	Sarikei
—	Sg. Mador - Sg. Jikang	Jalan Sibu–Sarikei	Sarikei
—	Sg. Jikang - Kanowit Junction	Jalan Sibu–Sarikei	Sarikei
—	Kanowit Junction - Durin Ferry Point	Jalan Sibu–Sarikei	Sibu
—	Durin Ferry Point - Sibu Junction (M 12 Junction)	Jalan Sibu–Sarikei	Sibu
—	Sibu Junction (M 12 Junction ) - Sg. Pasai	Jalan Sibu–Bintulu	Sibu
—	Sg. Pasai - Btg. Oya	Jalan Sibu–Bintulu	Sibu
—	Btg. Oya - Bukit Singalang	Jalan Sibu–Bintulu	Sibu
—	Bukit Singalang - Btg. Mukah	Jalan Sibu–Bintulu	Sibu
—	Btg. Mukah - Sg. Buluh	Jalan Sibu–Bintulu	Sibu
—	Sg. Buluh - Btg. Balingian	Jalan Sibu–Bintulu	Sibu
—	Btg. Balingian - Kemena Junction	Jalan Sibu–Bintulu	Sibu
—	Kemena Junction - Sg. Arip Bridge End	Jalan Sibu–Bintulu	Sibu
—	Sg. Arip - Sibu / Bintulu Boundary	Jalan Sibu–Bintulu	Bintulu
—	Sibu / Bintulu Boundary - Batang Tatau	Jalan Sibu–Bintulu	Bintulu
—	Batang Tatau - Sg. Semanok	Jalan Sibu–Bintulu	Bintulu
—	Sg. Semanok - Sg. Selad	Jalan Sibu–Bintulu	Bintulu
—	Sg. Selad - Batang Kemena	Jalan Sibu–Bintulu	Bintulu
—	Batang Kemena - Bintulu Junction	Jalan Sibu–Bintulu	Bintulu
—	Bintulu Junction - Sg. Sibiu No.2	Jalan Miri–Bintulu	Bintulu
—	Nyabau Jnt. (end of single CW) - Bintulu Jnt.	Jalan Miri–Bintulu	Bintulu
—	Sg. Sibiu No.2 - Sg. Sibiu No.3	Jalan Miri–Bintulu	Bintulu
—	Sg. Sibiu No.3 - Mile 22 Quarry Junction	Jalan Miri–Bintulu	Bintulu
—	Mile 22 Quarry junction - Sg. Similajau	Jalan Miri–Bintulu	Bintulu
—	Sg. Similajau - Rumah Lankan	Jalan Miri–Bintulu	Bintulu
—	Rumah Lankan - Bintulu / Miri Boundary	Jalan Miri–Bintulu	Bintulu
—	Bintulu / Miri Boundary - Sg. Suai	Jalan Miri–Bintulu	Bintulu
—	Sg. Suai - Telabit Junction	Jalan Miri–Bintulu	Miri
—	Telabit Junction - Niah Junction	Jalan Miri–Bintulu	Miri
—	Niah junction - Subis 2 Junction	Jalan Miri–Bintulu	Miri
—	Subis 2 Junction - Karabungan Junction	Jalan Miri–Bintulu	Miri
—	Karabungan Junction - Sg. Bakas	Jalan Miri–Bintulu	Miri
—	Sg. Bakas - Bekenu Junction	Jalan Miri–Bintulu	Miri
—	Bekenu Junction - Entulang Junction	Jalan Miri–Bintulu	Miri
—	Entulang Junction - Sg. Liku	Jalan Miri–Bintulu	Miri
—	Sg. Liku - Sg. Rait Junction	Jalan Miri–Bintulu	Miri
—	Sg. Rait Junction - Miri Airport Junction	Jalan Miri–Bintulu	Miri
—	Miri Airport Junction - Puchong Roundabout	Jalan Miri–Bintulu	Miri
—	Puchong Roundabout - Miri Airport Junction	Jalan Miri–Bintulu	Miri
—	Puchong Roundabout - Sg. Lutong (UP)	Jalan Miri–Lutong	Miri
—	Sg. Miri - Puchong Roundabout (DOWN)	Jalan Miri–Lutong	Miri
Federal Route 1 Section 81	Sg. Lutong - Kuala Baram Ferry Point	Jalan Lutong–Kuala Baram	Miri
Federal Route 1 Section 82	Kuala Baram Ferry Point - Sg. Tujuh Checkpoint (Brunei-Malaysia Border)	Jalan Kuala Baram–Sungai Tujuh	Miri
—	Tedungan Checkpoint, Limbang (Brunei-Malaysia Border) - Sg. Limbang	Jalan Tedungan-Limbang	Limbang
—	Sg. Limbang Bridge - Ng. Medamit / Batu Danau Junction	Jalan Tedungan-Limbang	Limbang
—	Ng. Medamit/Batu Danau Jnt.-Kubong/Ng. Medamit Jnt.	Jalan Tedungan-Limbang	Limbang
—	Kubong Junction - Limbang Town (Police Station)	Jalan Limbang	Limbang
—	Limbang Town - Pandaruan Checkpoint, Limbang (Brunei-Malaysia Border)	Jalan Limbang	Limbang
—	Mengkalap Checkpoint, Lawas (Brunei-Malaysia Border) - Sg. Trusan	Jalan Lawas	Limbang
Federal Route 1 Section 89	Sg. Trusan - Lawas Town	Jalan Lawas	Limbang
Federal Route 1 Section 90	Lawas Town - Batang Lawas	Jalan Lawas	Limbang
Federal Route 1 Section 91	Batang Lawas - Sg. Malagang	Jalan Lawas	Limbang
Federal Route 1 Section 92	Sg. Malagang - Lawas/Sabah Border	Jalan Lawas	Limbang

== See also ==
- Pan Borneo Highway
  - Malaysia Federal Route 1 (Sabah)
  - Malaysia Federal Route 22
  - Malaysia Federal Route 13 (Sabah)
