= Jalan Kuching–Sibu =

Road in Malaysia

Federal Route 1
- Jalan Kuching–Sibu

Route information
- Part of AH150
- Maintained by Malaysian Public Works Department
- Component highways: FT 1-11 Federal Route 1-11; FT 1-12 Federal Route 1-12; FT 1-13 Federal Route 1-13; FT 1-14 Federal Route 1-14; FT 1-15 Federal Route 1-15; FT 1-16 Federal Route 1-16

Major junctions
- North end: 3rd Mile Interchange, Kuching
- FT 1-10 Jalan Batu Kawa; Q1004 Jalan Kuching-Bau; FT 801 Kuching Bypass; Q8101 Jalan Datuk Mohd Musa; FT 21 Jalan Serian–Tebedu; FT 1 Pan Borneo Highway
- Southeast end: Serian Roundabout

Location
- Country: Malaysia
- Primary destinations: Kota Sentosa, Kota Padawan, Kota Samarahan, Siburan, Beratok, Tapah, Simunjan

Highway system
- Highways in Malaysia; Expressways; Federal; State

Jalan Kuching–Sibu is a major highway in the Kuching, Samarahan, Serian, Sri Aman, Betong, Sarikei and Sibu Divisions in Sarawak, Malaysia. This highway is part of the Pan Borneo Highway (AH150) under federal Public Works Department.

The Kilometre Zero for all roads in Sarawak is the Charles Brooke Memorial in Kuching. Jalan Kuching–Serian begins from the 3rd Mile Interchange and ends at the Serian Roundabout.

== Features ==
The major section of Jalan Kuching–Sibu is the dual carriageway, which begins at the 15th Mile Intersection and ends at the Sibu Junction.

The part of Pan Borneo Highway project, Serian will have two interchanges, Serian Interchange 1 at the Serian Roundabout and Serian Interchange 2 at the St Teresa's Church, which can eases the traffic from Kuching and Sri Aman. It was carried by Lebuhraya Borneo Utara (LBU) Sdn Bhd as a turnkey contractor and Zecon Kimlun JV Consortium Sdn Bhd, the main contractor.

== List of interchanges ==
Km	Exit	Interchange	To	Remarks
		Kuching; 3rd Mile Intersection	North; Q3A Jalan Tun Ahmad Zaidi Adruce (formerly Jalan Keretapi); City centre Northeast; Jalan Rock; City centre Batu Lintang; Padungan; Stampin Southeast; Q4 Jalan Sherip Masahor; Taman Hua Joo; Taman Hui Sing; Taman Seng Goon Kenyalang Interchange; Taman Satria Jaya; Kuching International Airport Southwest AH150 Jalan Datuk Amar Kalong Ningkan; Entry into roundabout only West; FT 1-10 AH150 Jalan Batu Kawa; FT 1-10 AH150 Batu Kawa; FT 1-8 AH150 Tondong; Q141 Lundu; FT 1-1 AH150 Sematan	6-way Roundabout with Flyover connecting North↔South and Underpass connecting West↔Northeast
Start/End of highway
AH150 Jalan Datuk Tawi Sli (Southbound route); Jalan Datuk Amar Kalong Ningkan (Northbound route)
	Southbound			
		5th Mile Intersection	East; Jalan Datu Banadar Mustapha; Green Heights; Green Heights Mall Kenyalang Interchange; Taman Satria Jaya; Kuching International Airport West; Stapok	4-way Signalised Intersection
AH150 Jalan Datuk Amar Kalong Ningkan (Southbound route); Jalan Datuk Amar Kalong Ningkan (Northbound route)
		6th Mile Intersection	East; Jalan Lapangan Terbang Baru; Kuching International Airport; RMP Air Wing Unit; RMAF Kuching Air Base	3-way Signalised Intersection
AH150 Jalan Penrissen (Southbound route); Jalan Penrissen (Northbound route)
			Kuching Sentral	Southbound
Kuching District; Kuching City South-Padawan city limit
		Kota Sentosa Intersection (7th Mile Intersection)	West; Q6 Jalan Kuching-Bau; Batu Kitang; Q115 Buso; Q115 Bau; Q133 Serikin East; Jalan Liu Shan Bang; Kota Sentosa Commercial Centre; Sentosa Mental Hospital	4-way Signalised Intersection
Kuching Division; Kuching district border
Kuching–Samarahan division border
Samarahan Division; Samarahan district border
		8th Mile Intersection	West; Penrissen Camp East; FT 802 Jalan Datuk Mohd Musa; Kota Samarahan	4-way Signalised Intersection
Samarahan Division; Samarahan district border
Sungai Entingan Bridge; Samarahan–Kuching division border
Kuching Division; Kuching Proper district border
AH150 Jalan Penrissen (Southbound route) AH150 Jalan Penrissen (Northbound route)
		Kota Padawan Intersection (10th Mile Intersection)	West; Q117 Jalan Puncak Borneo; Borneo Heights	3-way Signalised Intersection
FT 1-13 AH150 Jalan Kuching–Serian
FT 1-13; 18.5		RTD Intersection	RTD Sarawak Headquarters	3-way Signalised Intersection
			Semenggoh Wildlife Rehabilitation Centre	T-junctions
Kuching Division; Kuching Proper district border
Kuching-Serian division border
Serian Division Siburan sub-district border
		15th Mile Intersection	Northeast; Kota Samarahan Southwest; Kampung Mambong	4-way Signalised Intersection
		Siburan	Jong's Crocodile Farm & Zoo; Kampung Batu Gong	T-junctions
FT 1-13 AH150 Jalan Kuching–Serian
		Sungai Du'uh		
FT 1-14 AH150 Jalan Kuching–Serian
		Sungai Batu		
		Beratok	Jalan Beratok	
		Sungai Embang		
		Tapah	Jalan Tapah	
		Tapah Pepper Plantations		T-junctions
		Kampung Panchor Dayak		
FT 1-14 AH150 Jalan Kuching–Serian
Serian Division; Siburan sub-district border
Serian Division; Serian district border
		Batang Samarahan		
FT 1-15 AH150 Jalan Kuching–Serian
		Sungai Baru		
FT 1-15 AH150 Jalan Kuching–Serian
		Sungai Mamat		
FT 1-16 AH150 Jalan Kuching–Serian
		Sungai Baki		
		Sungai Bukit		
		Sungai Tarat		
		Kampung Rayang	North; Jalan Kampung Reban; Kota Samarahan; Asajaya West; Jalan Bantang; Bantang	T-junctions
		Batang Sadong		
FT 1-16 AH150 Jalan Kuching–Serian; Start/End of highway
		Serian; Serian Roundabout	West; FT 21 Jalan Serian–Tebedu; Tebakang; Tebedu; Bandar Mutiara; Indonesia East; Serian Bypass; Taman Pasir; FT 1 AH150 Jalan Sri Aman–Serian; Simunjan; Sri Aman Southeast; FT 1 Jalan Bandar Serian; Serian Hospital; Serian town centre FT 1 AH150 Jalan Sri Aman–Serian; Simunjan; Sri Aman	4-way Roundabout
