= Lanang Bridge =

Lanang Bridge Jambatan Lanang
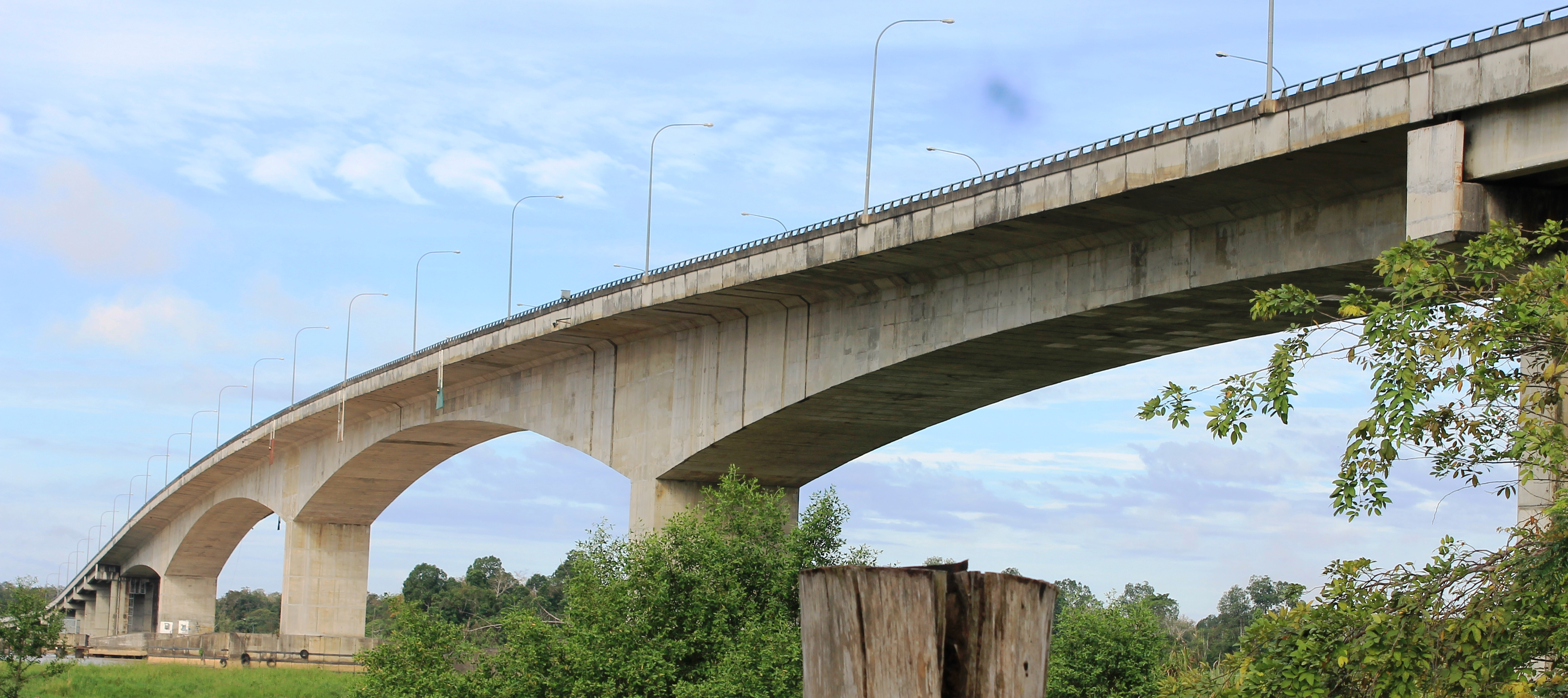
- Coordinates: 2°14′40″N 111°50′0″E
- Carries: Motor vehicles
- Crosses: Batang Rajang, Sarawak, Malaysia
- Locale: Q326 Jalan Lanang Barat / Jalan Teluk Assan
- Maintained by: Sarawak Public Works Department (JKR); Woodville Development Sdn. Bhd.

Characteristics
- Design: box girder bridge
- Total length: 1.2 km

History
- Designer: Territory Government of Sarawak; Sarawak Public Works Department (JKR); Woodville Development Sdn. Bhd.
- Constructed by: Woodville Development Sdn. Bhd.
- Construction start: 2003
- Construction end: 2006
- Opened: 11 April 2006

Location
- Interactive map of Lanang Bridge

The Lanang Bridge, Sarawak Route Q326, is a 1.2-km toll bridge in Sibu, Sarawak, Malaysia. It was constructed in 2003 by a local concessionaire, Woodville Development Sdn. Bhd., a subsidiary of Shin Yang Group, to replace the former river ferry service crossing the Batang Rajang. The bridge, together with a series of states highways linking Sibu to Sarikei (Jalan Teluk Assan Q326, Jalan Tanjung Genting Q576, Jalan Kelupu Q206, Sarikei-Bintangor Highway Q345, and Sarikei-Pasi-Meradong Highway Q575), forms an alternative route for the Sarikei-Sibu section of the Pan Borneo Highway. Built at the total cost of RM 180 million, the bridge was opened to motorists on 11 April 2006.

== Overview ==
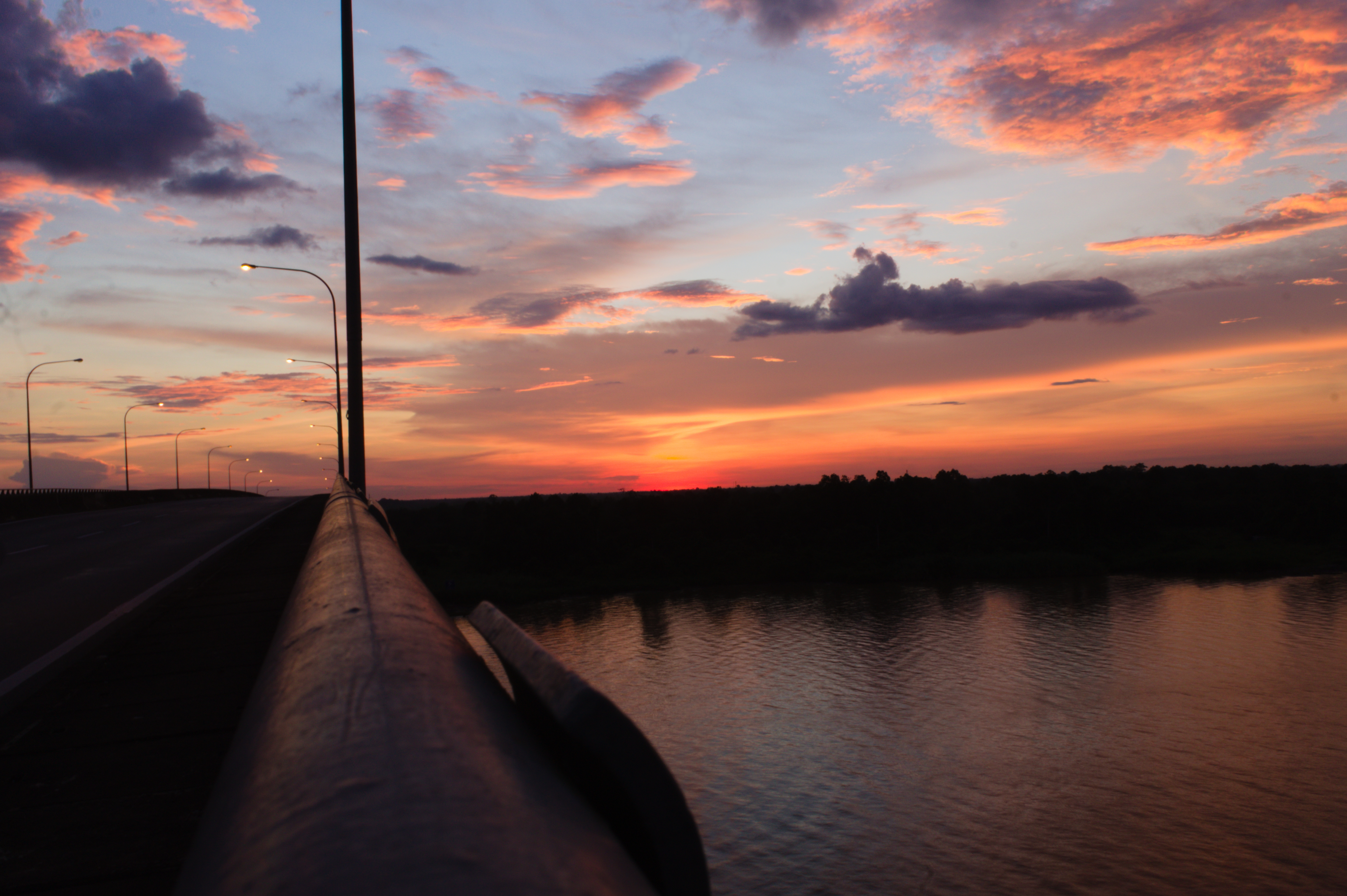
Sunset on the Lanang bridge

The bridge is built at 6 km upstream of the Sibu town centre with dual carriageway. The bridge joins Lanang road and Paradom road across the river.

== Toll collection and subsequent abolishment ==
A toll plaza was built at 435 metres away from the bridge on the side of the Paradom road. The bridge was meant for toll collection for 22 years.

Class	Type of vehicles	Rate (in Malaysian Ringgit (RM))
1	Motorcycles	Free (starting 11 May 2011)
2	Cars (including taxicabs and MPVs)	Free (starting 11 May 2011)
3	Vans, minibuses, pickup trucks, SUVs and light trucks (less than 5 tonnes	Free (starting 11 May 2011)
4	Buses	Free (starting 11 May 2011)
5	Lorries (excluding trailers)	Free (starting 11 May 2011)
6	Trailers	Free (starting 11 May 2011)

The bridge was heavily criticised by motorists, especially the residents of Sarikei and Sibu, who regularly use the toll bridge for its ridiculously expensive toll rates. For instance, cars are charged at RM3.00 per crossing, which translates to RM2.50 per kilometre. Motorcycles are also charged at RM0.50. As a result, car drivers frequently commuting from Sarikei to Sibu and vice versa may need to spend as much as RM300 monthly for the toll bridge alone.

Due to the criticisms by local residents, on 2011 the federal government proposed to take over the bridge and abolish the toll collection.

On 29 April 2015, the then-Chief Minister (nowadays Premier) of Sarawak Adenan Satem announced that the toll were completely abolished on May 25 that year, along with the other 2 toll bridges in the state.

== Junctions lists ==
The entire route is located in Sarawak.

Legend:

- I/C - Interchange, I/S - Intersection, RSA - Rest and service area, OBR - Overhead bridge restaurant, R/R - Restaurant and rest plaza, L/B - Layby, V/P - Vista point, TN - tunnel, T/P - Toll plaza, BR - Bridge
- C - Cloverleaf, S - Stack, T-A - Trumpet-A, T-B - Trumpet-B, DT - Directional-T/Y, SDT - Semi-Directional-T/Y, P-Y - Partial-Y, D - Diamond, P-C - Partial cloverleaf, D-D - Diverging diamond, D-R - Direct ramp

Division	District	Location	km	mi	Name	Destinations	Notes
Sibu	Sibu	Sibu			Sibu	FT 1 Malaysia Federal Route 1 – Bintulu, Miri, Sibu town center, Upper Lanang Industrial Estate	4-way signalised intersection Start/End of dual-carriageway
Sibu	Sibu	Sibu			Petronas L/B (Sarikei bound) – Petronas		
Sibu-Sarikei division border					Batang Rajang Bridge; Rajang Bridge; 1.2 km		
Sarikei	Meradong	Meradong			U-turn	U-turn	Sibu bound
Sarikei	Meradong	Meradong			Former Lanang Bridge toll plaza Toll operation discontinued		
Sarikei	Meradong	Meradong			Jalan Teluk Assan	Q326 Jalan Teluk Assan – Bintangor, Sarikei	Start/End of dual-carriageway
1.000 mi = 1.609 km; 1.000 km = 0.621 mi: Closed/former
