= Tebedu District =

- District

- Location within Borneo
- Coordinates: 1°00′55″N 110°21′17″E
- Country: Malaysia
- State: Sarawak
- Division: Serian Division
- Seat: Tebedu

Government
  - Local Government: Tebedu District Office

Area
  - Total: 421 km^{2} (163 sq mi)
- Elevation: 99 m (325 ft)

Population (2010)
  - Total: 8,204
  - Density: 19.5/km^{2} (50.5/sq mi)
- Time zone: UTC+8 (MST)

Tebedu District is a district in the state of Sarawak, Malaysia. It is a part of Serian Division that consists of Serian, Siburan, and Tebedu districts. Before this, Tebedu District was a sub-district under Serian District which was then fully upgraded to a district in its own right. The majority of the population of this district is from the Bidayuh ethnic group.

The administrative town for this district is the town of Tebedu. Tebedu District has an area of approximately 421 square kilometres (163 mi^{2}). It is also the first international gateway of the Malaysian-Indonesia border, connecting Kuching in Sarawak dan Pontianak in West Kalimantan. The Indonesian town bordering this district is Entikong. Tebedu Immigration Complex was also built at the border between both countries. In 1991, more than 57,000 Indonesians entered Malaysia via Entikong by using the immigration centre located between West Kalimantan and Tebedu District.

== Etymology ==
The name "Tebedu" comes from a term in Bidayuh language, batuh badu which literally means "dried rock". The said rock is located at Kujang Mawang Village and Tesu Mawang Village and is reputed to have never been wet or inundated by water.

== History ==
On 23 October 1974, Tebedu became an autonomous sub-district (daerah kecil) under the administration of Serian District, managed by Sarawak Administrative Officer. The holder of the post during that time was Mering Wan. In Oktober 2016, Daerah Kecil Tebedu was upgraded to a full-fledged district as announced by the then Member of the State Legislative Assembly for Tebedu, Michael Manyin Jawong. A landmark was built to commemorate the event.

== Demographics ==
Based on 2010 Malaysian Census, Tebedu District had 8,204 residents with a population density of 19 people per square kilometre, which categorised this district as a district with a sparse population. In terms of ethnicity, most of the people who lived here belonged to the Bidayuh ethnic group, which numbered at 7,421 people. The lowest was of Melanau ethnic group, with only 19 people.

Total population by ethnicity in 2010.
No.	Ethnic group	Number (people)
1	Malay	275
2	Iban	117
3	Bidayuh	7,421
4	Melanau	19
5	Other Bumiputera groups	21
6	Chinese	162
7	Indians	24
8	Others	63
9	Non-citizens	102

== Economy ==
The main economic activity carried out by residents in Tebedu District is agriculture, with a percentage of 88.2%. This is followed by the private labours (5.08%), public employees (3.66%), private employees (2.29%), business (0.74%) and other economic activities (0.03%). Among the crops cultivated in this district are rice, cocoa, pepper and oil palm. Various agricultural processing industries for the crops are carried out in Tebedu because of its excellent infrastructure facilities.

== Facilities ==
Tebedu District has good facilities. It has two health clinics, namely Tebedu Health Clinic and Amo Health Clinic. Some schools that operate in this district are Sekolah Menengah Kebangsaan Tebedu, Sekolah Kebangsaan Tebedu, Sekolah Kebangsaan Gahat Mawang, Sekolah Kebangsaan Kujang Mawang, Sekolah Kebangsaan Tesu, Sekolah Kebangsaan Temong, Sekolah Kebangsaan Tepoi, Sekolah Kebangsaan Sungan, Sekolah Kebangsaan Sungai Sameran, Sekolah Kebangsaan Tema and Sekolah Kebangsaan Kujang Sain. Telecommunication is provided by Telekom Malaysia, Celcom, Maxis and DiGi, while the water supply is managed by Bekalan Air Bersih (Clean Water Supply) by JKR in 30 villages including Tebedu Town and through gravity feed in 20 villages. SESCO (Sarawak Energy) handles the electricity supply across the district. Tebedu is also connected through the Serian-Tebedu Road which has a length of 38 kilometres (23.6 mi).

Built since 1990, the Tebedu ICQS (Immigration, Customs, Quarantine and Security (ICQS) Complex at the border crossing was planned for upgrading or rebuilding in 2018 to further improve its services and facilities to be on par with the ICQS at Entikong in Indonesia as well as to foster cross-border trade and tourism between Indonesia and Malaysia. The government also envisioned Tebedu ICQS as a modern complex with the latest infrastructure to facilitate cross-border movement and trade. These initiatives will develop Tebedu into an economic area and to strengthen the security between Sarawak and West Kalimantan.

== Geography ==
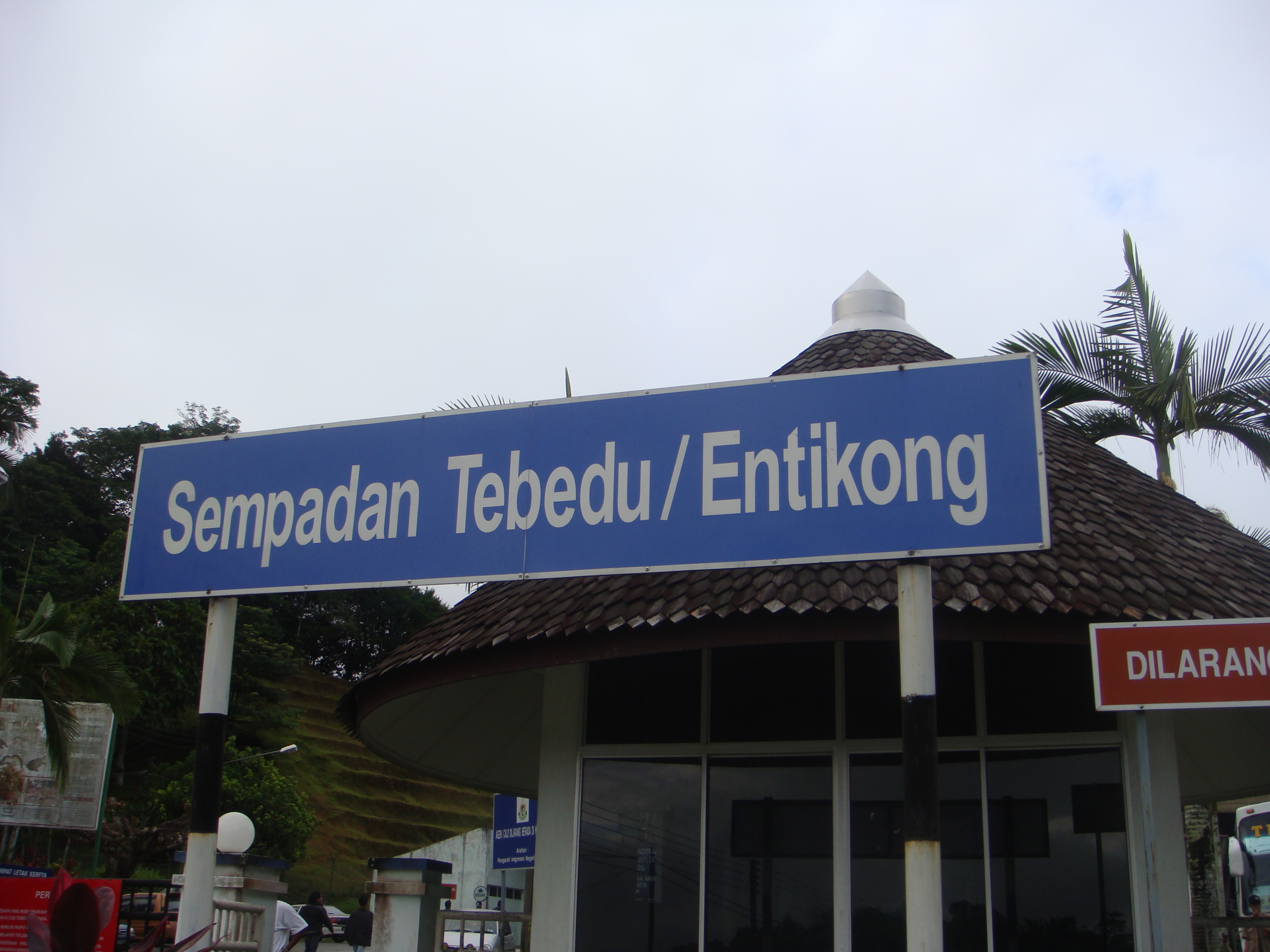
The border checkpoint

Tebedu is one of the first international gateways in Malaysia. The climate in the Tebedu area is the tropical rainforest climate (Af) according to Köppen climate classification. The average temperature is 25.9 °C (78.6 °F). May is the hottest month, with the temperature reaching 26.3 °C (79.3 °F). January, meanwhile, is the coolest month with a temperature of 25.5 °C (77.9 °F). The average precipitation in Tebedu is 3,798 mm (149.5 in) per year, with January recording the highest precipitation of 530 mm (21 in). The lowest precipitation is in July, with 165.9 mm (6.53 in).

Climate data for Tebedu (1990–2019)
Month	Jan	Feb	Mar	Apr	May	Jun	Jul	Aug	Sep	Oct	Nov	Dec	Year
Daily mean °C (°F)	25.5 (77.9)	25.6 (78.1)	25.9 (78.6)	26.1 (79.0)	26.3 (79.3)	26.1 (79.0)	26.1 (79.0)	26 (79)	25.7 (78.3)	25.8 (78.4)	25.7 (78.3)	25.7 (78.3)	25.9 (78.6)
Average precipitation mm (inches)	530.9 (20.90)	450.4 (17.73)	323 (12.7)	302.8 (11.92)	269.3 (10.60)	208.3 (8.20)	165.9 (6.53)	215.2 (8.47)	219.3 (8.63)	345.2 (13.59)	347.3 (13.67)	420.3 (16.55)	3,797.9 (149.49)
Source: ClimateCharts

== Administration ==
Tebedu District is separated into 75 villages with each village having a leader (either a tuai rumai or chaiperson of the Jawatankuasa Kemajuan dan Keselamatan Kampung or JKKK (Village Development and Security Committee). Tebedu District is fully administered by the Tebedu District Office. Previously, it was administered by the Tebedu Sub-district Office. Tebedu district is led by a district officer.

Politically, Tebedu has its own state constituency for election purposes, Tebedu, which has been represented in Sarawak State Legislative Assembly since 1991. The Member of the State Legislative Assembly for the constituency is Michael Manyin Jawong from Gabungan Parti Sarawak. Tebedu constituency hasd six polling districts, Bentang, Lanchang, Tebedu, Amo and Mengarat. Each voting district has only one voting location.
