= Lanang (disambiguation) =

Lanang is a Federal constituency of Sarawak, Malaysia. It may also refer to the following:

== Places ==
- Lanang Bridge, a toll bridge in Sibu, Sarawak, Malaysia
- SM Lanang, a shopping mall in Davao City, Philippines

== People ==
- Lanang Ali Jr., Filipino politician
