= Jalan Bakun =

Road in Malaysia

Federal Route 803
- Jalan Bakun (Jalan Bintulu-Bakun)

Route information
- Length: 128.4 km (79.8 mi)
- Existed: 2002–present

Major junctions
- Northwest end: Jalan Bintulu-Miri Intersections; FT 1 AH150 Jalan Bintulu-Miri

- FT 1 AH150 Jalan Bintulu-Miri; Jalan Sungai Asap
- Southeast end: Bakun Hydroelectric Dam

Location
- Country: Malaysia
- Primary destinations: Rumah Teban; Rumah Bilong; Tubau; Sungai Asap; Belaga

Highway system
- Highways in Malaysia; Expressways; Federal; State

Jalan Bakun or Jalan Bintulu-Bakun, Federal Route 803, is a federal road in Bintulu and Kapit Division, Sarawak, Malaysia. It is a main route to Bakun Hydroelectric Dam.

At most sections, the Federal Route 803 was built under the JKR R5 road standard, allowing maximum speed limit of up to 90 km/h.

== List of junctions and town ==
km	Exit	Junctions	To	Remarks
		Jalan Bintulu-miri Intersections	FT 1 AH150 Jalan Bintulu-miri Southwest; Bintulu; Tatau; Bintulu Airport Northeast; Miri; Niah; Niah Caves	3-way intersections
		Rumah Teban		
		Sungai Kemena bridge		
		Rumah Bilong		
		Sungai Teban bridge		
		Tubau		
Bintulu Division; Bintulu District Border; JKR Bintulu Division border limit
Bintulu-Kapit division border
Kapit Division; Belaga District Border; JKR Kapit Division border limit
		Jalan Sungai Asap	Northeast; Jalan Sungai Asap; Sungai Asap	3-way intersections
		Sungai Penyuan bridge		
		Bakun		
Bakun Dam and hydroelectric station Sarawak Hidro border limit Restricted area
		Bakun Dam and hydroelectric station	Bakun Dam and hydroelectric station Main Hydroelectric Dam; Main Intake; Sarawak Hidro Staff Quarters; Sarawak Hidro Clubhouse	

== Pan Borneo Highway project ==
As a part of the Pan Borneo Highway project (WPC 10; Bintulu Airport Junction to Sg. Tangap), Jalan Bakun will have new four lane two way carriageway and an interchange at its junction. It was taken by Lebuhraya Borneo Utara (LBU) Sdn Bhd as turnkey contractor and the main contractor of the project is Pekerjaan Piasau Konkerit Sdn Bhd (PPK).
