= Jalan Lapangan Terbang Baru Sibu =

Road in Malaysia

Federal Route 919
- Jalan Lapangan Terbang Baru Sibu

Major junctions
- Southwest end: Sibu Airport Intersections; FT 1 AH150 Jalan Sibu-Durin

- FT 1 AH150 Jalan Sibu-Durin
- Northeast end: Sibu Airport

Location
- Country: Malaysia
- Primary destinations: Sibu Airport

Highway system
- Highways in Malaysia; Expressways; Federal; State

Jalan Lapangan Terbang Baru Sibu, or New Sibu Airport Road, Federal Route 919, is a federal road in Sibu Division, Sarawak, Malaysia.

At most sections, the Federal Route 919 was built under the JKR R5 road standard, with a speed limit of 90 km/h.

== List of junctions and towns ==
km	Exit	Junctions	To	Remarks
		Sibu Airport Intersections	FT 1 AH150 Jalan Sibu-Durin Northwest; Sibu Town Centre; Sarikei; Selangau; Mukah Southeast; Sibu Jaya; Durin; Kanowit	3-way intersections
FT 1 AH150 Jalan Sibu-Durin; JKR Sibu Division border limit
Sibu Airport boundary Malaysia Airports border limit
		Sibu Airport Staff Quarters	Sibu Airport Staff Quarters	
		Sibu Airport	Northwest; Sibu Airport Control Tower; Department of Civil Aviation Sibu Office; Malaysia Airports office Southeast; Sibu Airport Cargo; Sibu Airport Fire Station	3-way intersections
		Sibu Airport	Departure and Arrival Level; Taxi and Bus Stop Level; Sibu Airport Car Park	From Jalan Sibu-Durin only
Sibu Airport
		Sibu Airport	Southeast; Sibu Airport Cargo; Sibu Airport Fire Station	3-way intersections
