= Malaysia Federal Route 3101 =

Road in Malaysia

Federal Route 3101

Major junctions
- West end: Durin Roundabout; FT 1 AH150 Pan Borneo Highway

- FT 1 AH150 Pan Borneo Highway; FT 3305 Jalan Machan
- East end: Kanowit

Location
- Country: Malaysia
- Primary destinations: Machan; Ulu Ranan

Highway system
- Highways in Malaysia; Expressways; Federal; State

Federal Route 3101 is a federal road in Sibu Division, Sarawak, Malaysia. It is a main route to Kanowit.

At most sections, the Federal Route 3101 was built under the JKR R5 road standard, with a speed limit of 90 km/h.

== List of junctions and towns ==
km	Exit	Junctions	To	Remarks
		Durin; Durin Roundabout	FT 1 AH150 Pan Borneo Highway North; FT 1 AH150 Jalan Durin-Sibu; Durin; Sibu; Sibu Airport South; FT 1 AH150 Jalan Durin-Julau; Julau; Bintangor; Sarikei	3-way roundabout
Sibu-Kanowit division border
		Machan; Jalan Machan Intersection	South; FT 3305 Jalan Machan; Machan	3-way intersection
		Ulu Ranan		
		Kanowit; Jalan Kanowit-Song-Kapit Intersection	East; FT 3101 Jalan Kanowit-Song-Kapit; FT 3101 Song; FT 3101 Kapit	3-way intersection
		Hospital Kanowit		
		Kanowit; Jalan Kanowit Intersection	North; Jalan Kanowit; Durin; Sibu	3-way intersection
		Kanowit; Kanowit Town Intersection	Jalan Wayang	4-way intersection
