= Jalan Lapangan Terbang Baru Bintulu =

Road in Malaysia

Federal Route 920
- Jalan Lapangan Terbang Baru Bintulu

Major junctions
- Southeast end: Bintulu Airport Intersections; FT 1 AH150 Jalan Bintulu-Tatau

- FT 1 AH150 Jalan Bintulu-Tatau
- Northwest end: Bintulu Airport

Location
- Country: Malaysia
- Primary destinations: Bintulu Airport

Highway system
- Highways in Malaysia; Expressways; Federal; State

Jalan Lapangan Terbang Baru Bintulu, or New Bintulu Airport Road, Federal Route 920, is a federal road in Bintulu Division, Sarawak, Malaysia.

At most sections, the Federal Route 920 was built under the JKR R5 road standard, with a speed limit of 90 km/h.

== List of junctions and towns ==
km	Exit	Junctions	To	Remarks
		Bintulu Airport Intersections	FT 1 AH150 Jalan Bintulu-Tatau Northeast; Bintulu Town Centre; Kidurong Southwest; Tatau; Mukah	3-way intersections
FT 1 AH150 Jalan Bintulu-Tatau; JKR Bintulu Division border limit
Bintulu Airport boundary Malaysia Airports border limit
		Bintulu Airport Roundabout	North; Bintulu Airport Control Tower; Bintulu Airport Fire Station South; Department of Civil Aviation Bintulu Office; Malaysia Airports office	4-way roundabout
		Bintulu Airport	Departure and Arrival Level; Taxi and Bus Stop Level; Bintulu Airport Car Park	From Bintulu Airport roundabout only
Bintulu Airport
		Bintulu Airport	Bintulu Airport Control Tower	

== Pan Borneo Highway project ==
Jalan Lapangan Terbang Baru Bintulu is included in the Pan Borneo Highway project and it was apprehended by the turnkey contractor, Lebuhraya Bonreo Utara Sdn Bhd (LBU). It was included in the work package contract (WPC)s 09 (To Sg Arip Bridge, Selangau) & 10 (To Nyabau & Bakun, Bintulu & Sg. Tangap, Miri). The main contractors of this project are KKBWCT Joint Venture Sdn Bhd & Pekerjaan Piasau Konkerit Sdn Bhd (PPK).
