= Jalan Tun Jugah =

Road in Malaysia

Route information
- Maintained by Malaysia Road Works Department (Sarawak)

Major junctions
- Northeast end: Uplands Roundabout
- Jalan Song; Jalan Laksamana Cheng Ho; Jalan Stampin
- Southwest end: Stutong Roundabout

Location
- Country: Malaysia
- Primary destinations: Kuching, Serian, Batu Kawa, Kuching International Airport, Stampin, Stutong

Highway system
- Highways in Malaysia; Expressways; Federal; State

Jalan Tun Jugah is a major and important road in Kuching Division, State of Sarawak, East Malaysia. It connects Jalan Simpang Tiga (going towards Kuching City) and Jalan Tun Razak (going towards Pending) in the northeast to Jalan Lapangan Terbang (going towards Kuching International Airport) and Jalan Dato Bandar Mustapha (going towards Serian) in the southwest.

== List of intersections ==
Division	District	Location	KM	Intersection	Destinations	Remarks
Kuching	Kuching	Uplands		Uplands Roundabout	Northwest: Jalan Simpang Tiga; Kuching City; Tabuan North: Telekom Malaysia Kuching Headquarters Northeast: Jalan Tun Razak; Sungai Apong; Pending East: Jalan Wan Alwi; Kota Samarahan; Tabuan Jaya West: Jalan Ong Tiang Swee; 3rd Mile Roundabout; FT 1-10 AH150 Batu Kawa	6-way roundabout with a flyover connecting southwest with northwest and northeast
Kuching	Kuching	Stampin		East Stampin Intersection	Southeast: Jalan Song; Tabuan Jaya West: Jalan Laksamana Cheng Ho; 3rd Mile Roundabout; FT 1-10 AH150 Batu Kawa	4-way signalised intersection
Kuching	Kuching	Stampin		Stampin Interchange	East: Jalan Stampin; Stampin; Taman Hui Sing	3-way signalised intersection
Kuching	Kuching	Stutong		Stutong Roundabout	Northwest: Jalan Sherif Mashor; Taman Hui Sing; Stampin; 3rd Mile Roudabout; FT 1-10 AH150 Batu Kawa East: Jalan Stutong; Stutong South: FT 900 Jalan Lapangan Terbang; FT 900 Kuching International Airport Southwest: Jalan Dato Bandar Mustapha; FT 1-11 AH150 Serian; FT 1-11 AH150 Sibu	5-way roundabout with a flyover connecting northeast with south and southwest
