= Tun Salahuddin Bridge =

Malaysian dual carriageway toll bridge

Expressway 24
- Tun Salahuddin Bridge
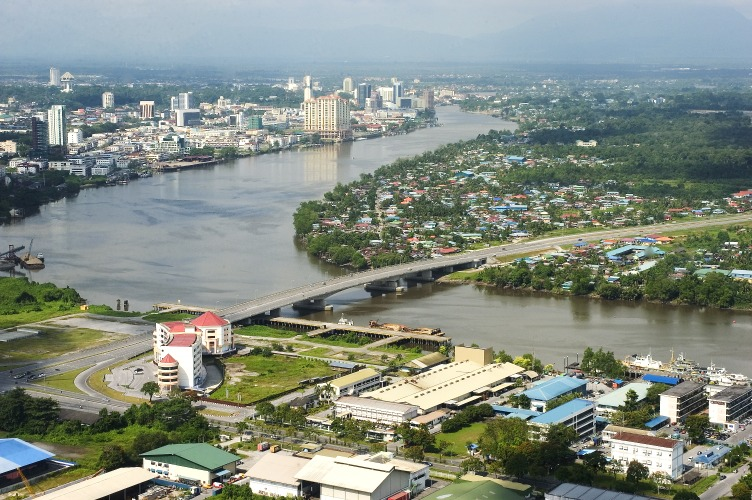
- Tun Salahuddin Bridge in 2007, viewed from eastern Kuching. At the background is the Kuching city centre.

Route information
- Maintained by Zecon Berhad
- Length: 4 km (2.5 mi)
- Existed: 2002–present
- History: Completed in 2003

Major junctions
- North end: Petra Jaya
- Kuching Bypass
- South end: Tanah Puteh

Location
- Country: Malaysia
- Primary destinations: Petra Jaya; Tanah Puteh

Highway system
- Highways in Malaysia; Expressways; Federal; State

The E24 Tun Salahuddin Bridge, or the Pending Bridge is a 4-kilometre (2.5-mile) dual carriageway toll bridge and controlled-access highway in the state of Sarawak, Malaysia. The bridge is located at Pending, a district in Kuching. It is span across the Sarawak River.

The bridge was named after Tun Abang Muhammad Salahuddin Abang Barieng (1921–2022), the Yang di-Pertua Negeri of Sarawak from 1975 to 1981 and again from 2001 to 2014.

== History ==
Tun Salahuddin Bridge was the first only toll expressway in East Malaysia, with collection commenced in October 2003. However, the toll collection of Tun Salahuddin Bridge was abolished on 1 January 2016 by the Sarawak state government. The dismantling of the toll structures was done a month later.

== Toll rates ==
Toll collection commenced on 1 October 2003, since then there has been no revision on the toll charges classified as (1) Car/Taxi – RM1.50, (2) Van/Pickup – RM2.00 (3) Truck/Buses – RM3.00, and (4) Motorcycle – RM0.50.
