= Malaysia Federal Route 13 (Sabah) =

Road in Sabah, Malaysia

Federal Route 13

Route information
- Part of AH150
- Maintained by Malaysian Public Works Department
- Length: 268 km (167 mi)

Major junctions
- Northeast end: Sandakan
- FT 22 Federal Route 22; Jalan Lahad Datu–Sahabat; SA13 Jalan Kunak; SA51 Jalan Semporna; Tawau–Keningau Highway
- Southwest end: Tawau

Location
- Country: Malaysia
- Primary destinations: Kinabatangan; Lahad Datu; Kunak; Semporna

Highway system
- Highways in Malaysia; Expressways; Federal; State

Federal Route 13, Asian Highway Route AH150 (formerly Federal Route A5), is a 268 km-long federal highway in Sabah, Malaysia. It is a component of the larger Pan Borneo Highway network. This highway runs primarily along the southeastern coast of Sabah from Sandakan to Tawau. The major towns it passes through include (from north to south) Kinabatangan, Lahad Datu and Kunak.

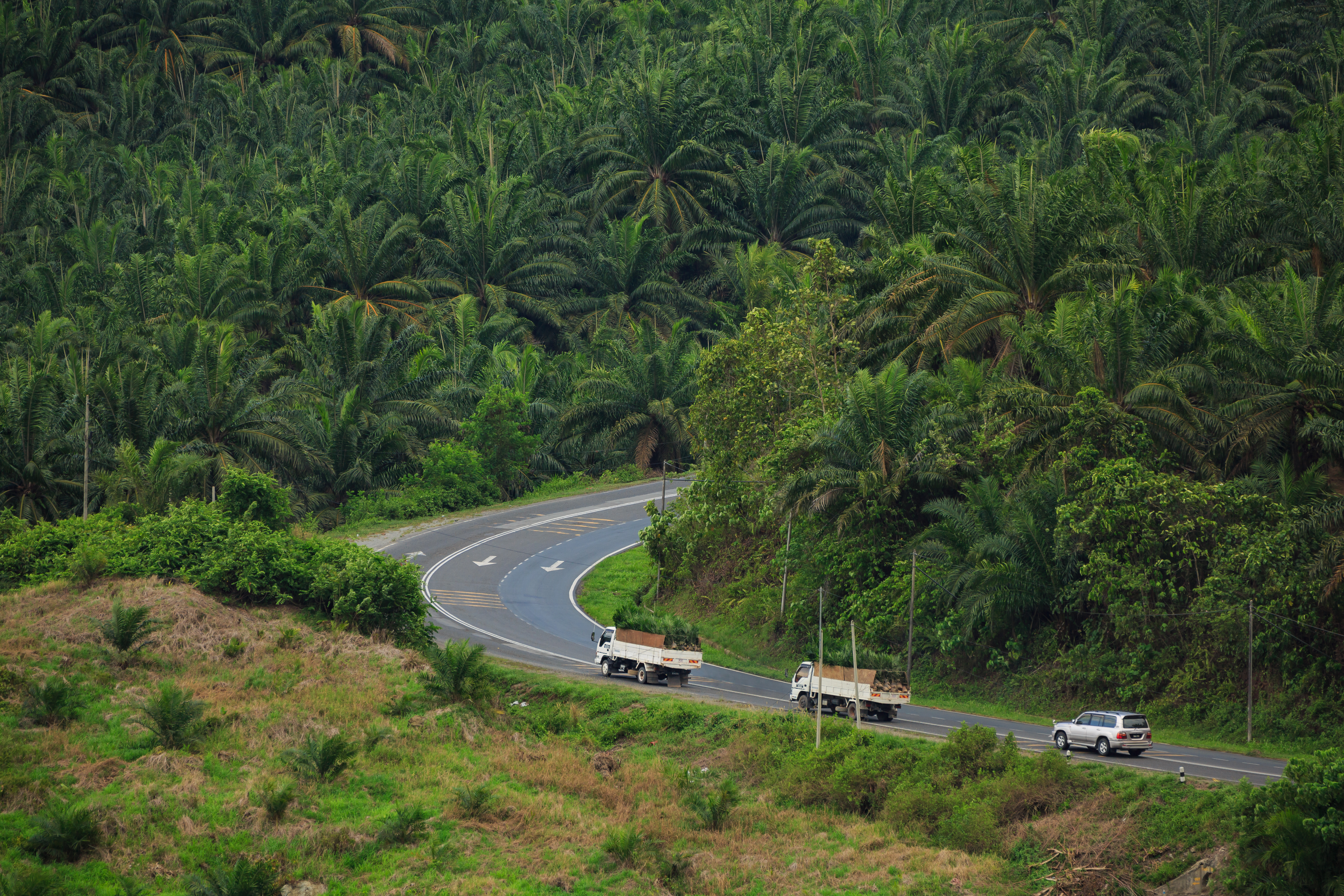
One of the rolling sections of the highway, running along the oil palm plantations, in Kunak near Mount Madai. Note the three-lanes climbing lane.

== Route background ==
Sabah section of Federal Route 13 starts from Mile 32 Checkpoint in Sandakan and terminus at the Tawau city centre. Most highway consist of inland, flat to gently undulating, where it crosses certain palm oil plantation, specifically at Kota Kinabatangan, while the road between Lahad Datu and Kunak traverses gently undulating to rolling hill that exceed only around 100 metres (330 ft), along a landslide that damaged road.

The federal highway used the JKR R5 road standard, with a speed limit of 90 km/h (56 mph).

== List of interchanges ==
| Km | Exit | Interchange | To | Remarks |
|---|---|---|---|---|
| | | Sandakan Mile 32 Checkpoint | East; FT 22 Sandakan West; FT 22 Telupid; FT 22 Ranau; FT 22 Kundasang; FT 22 Tamparuli; FT 1 Kota Kinabalu | T-junction |
| | | Kota Kinabatangan | | |
| | | Jalan Sukau | East; Sukau | T-junction |
| | | Sungai Kinabatangan bridge | | |
| | | Sungai Segama bridge | | |
| | | Segama | North; Segama | Junction; Start/End of dual-carriageway |
| | | Lahad Datu | East; Jalan Lahad Datu–FELDA Sahabat; Tungku; FELDA Sahabat | Roundabout |
| | | Sepagaya | | End/Start of dual-carriageway |
| | | Silam | Northwest; Jalan Lembah Danum; Danum Valley; Silam | Junction |
| | | Tingkayu | | |
| | | -- m above sea level | | Lahad Datu bound, Engage lower gear |
| | | Gua Madai (Madai Cave) | | |
| | | -- m above sea level | | Kunak bound, Engage lower gear |
| | | Jalan Kunak | East; SA13 Jalan Kunak; Kunak; Semporna | Roundabout |
| | | Mostyn Estate | | |
| | | Jalan Semporna | East; SA51 Jalan Semporna; Semporna | Roundabout |
| | | Balung | | |
| | | Tawau Airport | East; Jalan Lapangan Terbang Tawau; Tawau Airport | T-junction; Start/End of dual-carriageway |
| | | Bandar Sri Indah | | |
| | | Tawau | Northwest; Jalan Kuhara; Kalabakan; Sapulut; Nabawan; Sook; Keningau | Junctions |
