= Tebedu =

- Town and district capital
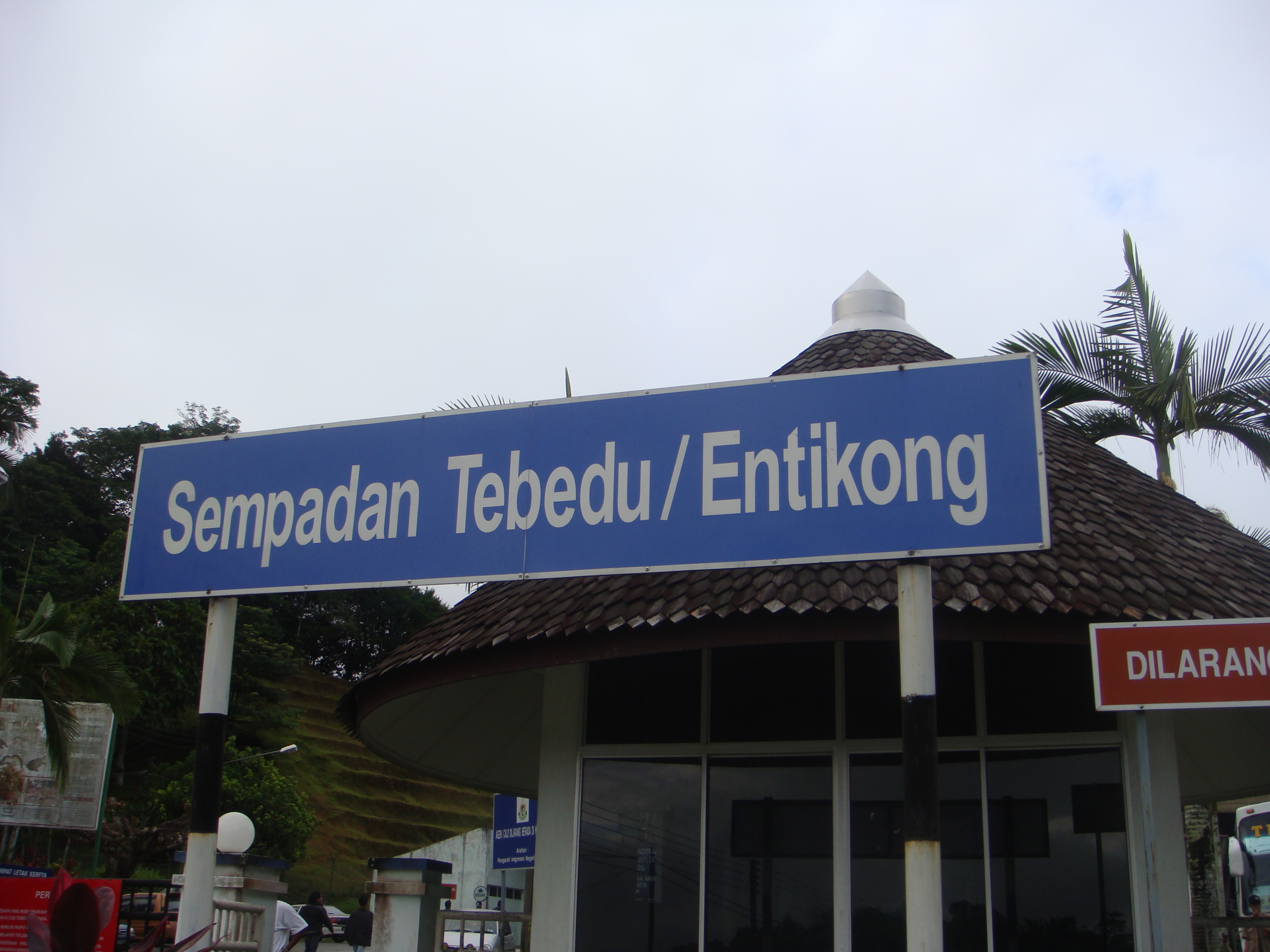
- Malaysia-Indonesia border sign in Tebedu

- Location within Borneo
- Coordinates: 1.01667°N 110.36667°E
- Country: Malaysia
- State: Sarawak
- Administrative Division: Serian
- District: Tebedu
- Elevation: 99 m (325 ft)

Tebedu (also known as Bandar Mutiara) is a border town in the Serian division of southwestern Sarawak, Malaysia, on the Indonesia-Malaysia border. It lies 63.2 kilometres (39 mi) south of the state capital Kuching. It is the administrative seat for Tebedu District.

Tebedu is the first and also the main land crossing between Malaysia and Indonesia. It is located along the main road linking Kuching, Sarawak and Pontianak, West Kalimantan. The town on the Indonesian side of the border is Entikong. In 2010, Matrade Sarawak director Omar Mohd Salleh stated that over 90% of Sarawak's export trade passed through Sungai Tujoh (on the border with Brunei) or through Tebedu.

Most of the town's inhabitants are indigenous people of the Bidayuh tribe. The minority Chinese operate retail and trade offering daily needs to the township.

Neighbouring settlements include:

- Kampung Entubu 2.6 kilometres (1.6 mi) southwest
- Kampung Bengan 4.1 kilometres (2.5 mi) northwest
- Kampung Tama 6.7 kilometres (4.2 mi) northeast
- Kampung Sijijak 6.7 kilometres (4.2 mi) northwest
- Kampung Sungan 7.4 kilometres (4.6 mi) north
- Kampung Tesu 7.6 kilometres (4.7 mi) east

== Climate ==
In Tebedu, during the entire year, the rain falls for 339.7 days and collects up to 2269mm (89.33") of precipitation. The wettest month (with the highest rainfall) is December (264mm). The driest months (with the least rainfall) are August and September (115mm). The month with the highest number of rainy days is May (30.8 days). The month with the least rainy days is July (24.3 days). Months with the longest days are May, June and July (Average daylight: 12.2h). Months with the shortest days are January, February, March, April, August, September, October, November and December (Average daylight: 12.1h). The month with the most sunshine is August (Average sunshine: 8h). The month with the least sunshine is January (Average sunshine: 5.7h).

== Tebedu ICQS ==
Built since 1990, the Tebedu ICQS (Immigration, Customs, Quarantine and Security) Complex at the border crossing was planned for an upgrade or rebuilding in 2018 to improve its services and facilities to be on par with the ICQS at Entikong in Indonesia as well as to foster cross-border trade and tourism between Indonesia and Malaysia. The government also envisioned Tebedu ICQS as a modern complex with the latest infrastructure to facilitate cross-border movement of people and goods. These initiatives will develop Tebedu into an economic area and strengthen the security between Sarawak and West Kalimantan.

== Sister cities ==
- Nemuro, Hokkaido, Japan
- Vanimo, Papua New Guinea

== State constituency ==
The state constituency represented in the Sarawak State Legislative Assembly is Tebedu (state constituency)
