= Jalan Lapangan Terbang Baru =

Road in Malaysia

Major junctions
- Northeast end: Bulatan Datu Bandar Mustapha
- FT 801 Kuching Bypass; Jalan Kuching Ranger Depot; FT 1-5 AH150 Kuching-Serian Highway
- Southwest end: Bulatan Batu Enam

Location
- Country: Malaysia
- Primary destinations: Kuching International Airport

Highway system
- Highways in Malaysia; Expressways; Federal; State

Jalan Lapangan Terbang Baru, Federal Routes 900A, 900B and 900C, is a major highway in Kuching city, Sarawak, Malaysia

== List of interchanges ==
Km	Exit	Interchange	To	Remarks
		Bulatan Datu Bandar Mustapha	FT 801 Kuching Bypass; Northeast; Tanah Puteh; Padungan; Pending; West; Penrissen; Serian Northwest; Jalan Engkabang; City centre East; Jalan Stutong; Tabuan Jaya; Kota Samarahan	Roundabout
		Kampung Cemerlang		
		Taman Borneo		
		Kuching International Airport	Kuching International Airport Arrival/Departure	
		Jalan Kuching Ranger Depot	East; Jalan Kuching Ranger Depot; Kuching Ranger Depot	T-junctions
		Bulatan Batu Enam	FT 1-15 AH150 Kuching-Serian Highway North; City centre Penrissen South; Serian; Seratok; Tapah; Bau	Roundabout
