= Entikong =

District in Sanggau Regency, Kalimantan Barat Province, Indonesia

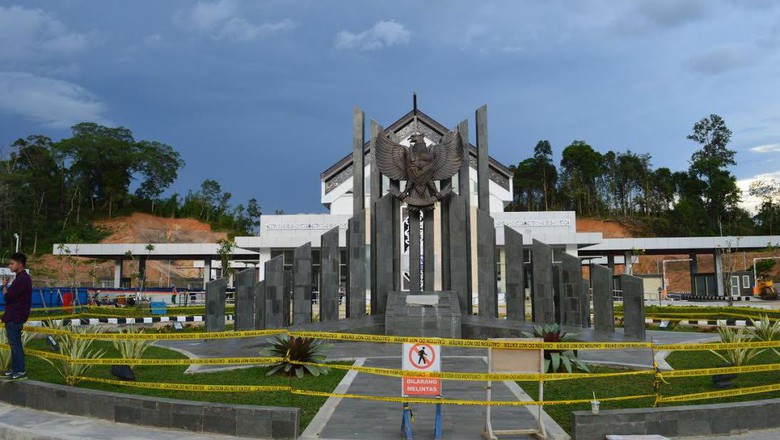
Entikong border crossing checkpoint

Entikong is a district (kecamatan) and also an administrative village (desa) within that district in Sanggau Regency of West Kalimantan Province, Indonesia. It is the location of the main border crossing between the West Kalimantan and the Malaysian state of Sarawak. The checkpoint on the Malaysian side of the border is called the Tebedu immigration, customs, quarantine and security checkpoint.

== History ==
Entikong district was established on 17 June 1996, after original Sekayam district was divided into two districts, namely are Sekayam and Entikong, pursuant to Indonesian Government Regulation Number 39 of 1996.

== Geography ==
Entikong district located in the hills which form the Indonesia-Malaysia border in the northern part of Sanggau Regency. To the north east across the border is the Serian Division of Sarawak, south east is the district of Sekayam, south the district of Beduai, west the district of Air Besar in Landak Regency and north-west the district of Jagoi Babang in Bengkayang Regency.

== Transportation ==
Entikong is served by the main road linking Pontianak, the capital of West Kalimantan 250 km to the southwest, through the border crossing into Sarawak to Kuching, the capital of Sarawak. Kuching is 100 km to the north of the border crossing. Most long-distance bus services linking Pontianak and cities in Sarawak use the Entikong border crossing.

== Border crossing ==
The Entikong border crossing checkpoint (Pos Lintas Batas Negara) is just south of the Malaysia-Indonesia border at Entikong village. The checkpoint on the Malaysian side is the Tebedu checkpoint in Serian Division, Sarawak.

It was the first land border crossing between Indonesia and a neighbouring country to be opened on 1 October 1989.

The checkpoint was newly renovated at a cost of 152 billion rupiah as part of the programme to upgrade border crossing checkpoints and border areas throughout Indonesia initiated by Indonesian President Joko Widodo. During a visit to Entikong, Jokowi had lamented about its condition especially when compared to the condition and facilities available at the Malaysian checkpoint in Tebedu. The new checkpoint which is located on a 8 hectare piece of land was inaugurated by Jokowi on 21 December 2016.

The operating hours of the checkpoint is between 5.00 am and 5.00 pm (6.00 am to 6.00 pm Malaysian Standard Time). It was reported that up to 1,000 people crossed the border at Entikong daily.

== See also ==
- Tebedu
- Indonesia-Malaysia border
