= Kuching Bypass =

Road in Malaysia

Federal Route 801
- Kuching Bypass

Route information
- Maintained by Malaysian Public Works Department

Major junctions
- Southwest end: 5th Mile Intersection, Kuching
- FT 1-15 AH150 Jalan Datuk Amar Kalong Ningkan; Tun Salahuddin Bridge Tun Salahuddin Bridge
- Northeast end: Pending Roundabout, Kuching

Location
- Country: Malaysia
- Primary destinations: Kuching International Airport; Stampin; Pending

Highway system
- Highways in Malaysia; Expressways; Federal; State

Kuching Bypass, consisting of Jalan Datu Bandar Mustapha, Jalan Tun Jugah and Jalan Tun Razak, Federal Route 801, is a major highway in Kuching city, Sarawak, Malaysia.

== List of interchanges and intersections ==
Km	Exit	Interchange / intersection	To	Remarks
		5th Mile Northeast Intersection	North AH150 Jalan Kuching–Serian (northbound route); City centre West; Stapok South AH150 Jalan Datuk Amar Kalong Ningkan (southbound route); Kota Sentosa; Serian	4-way signalised intersection
Jalan Datu Bandar Mustapha (eastbound route); Jalan Datu Bandar Mustapha (westbound route)
		Datuk Tawi Sli Intersection	North AH150 Jalan Datuk Tawi Sli (southbound route)	3-way signalised intersection No entry into Jalan Datuk Tawi Sli
		Stampin Tengah Intersection	Southeast; Jalan Stampin Tengah; Stampin Heights	3-way intersection Access into Jalan Stampin Tengah for westbound traffic only
		Green Heights Intersection	South; Lorong Lapangan Terbang 4 Green Heights; Green Heights Mall	3-way intersection Access into Lorong Lapangan Terbang 4 for westbound traffic only
Jalan Datu Bandar Mustapha (eastbound route); Jalan Datu Bandar Mustapha (westbound route)
		Kenyalang Interchange; Bulatan Datu Bandar Mustapha	Northwest; Q4 Jalan Sherip Masahor; Taman Hui Sing; City centre East; Jalan Stutong; Taman Satria Jaya; Tabuan Jaya Baru; Kota Samarahan South; Jalan Lapangan Terbang Baru (southbound route); Jalan Lapangan Terbang Baru (northbound route); Kuching International Airport	5-way roundabout with flyover connecting Northeast↔South, flyover connecting Southwest→Northeast and underpass connecting Northeast→Southwest
Jalan Tun Jugah (northeast bound route); Jalan Tun Jugah (southwest bound route)
		UCSI Intersection	UCSI University, Sarawak Campus	3-way intersection Access into UCSI for northeast bound traffic exiting from the roundabout only
		Durian Burung Intersection	Southeast; Jalan Durian Burung; Taman Satria Jaya	3-way intersection Access into Jalan Durian Burung for southwest bound traffic only
		Stampin Intersection	West; Jalan Stampin	3-way signalised intersection Traffic from Jalan Stampin cannot turn right into Jalan Tun Jugah (southwest bound route)
		Kempas Intersection	Southeast; Jalan Kempas; Taman Satria Jaya	3-way intersection Access into Jalan Kempas for southwest bound traffic only
		Mabel Garden Intersection	Northwest; Q130 Jalan Laksamana Cheng Ho; City centre via Jalan Rock; Batu Kawa; Bau; Lundu; Sematan Southeast; Q300 Jalan Song; Tabuan Heights; Friendship Garden	4-way signalised intersection
		Jelutong Intersection	West; Jalan Jelutong; Taman Kenny	3-way intersection Access into Jalan Jelutong for northeast bound traffic only
		Tabuan Dayak Intersection	Southeast; Jalan Tabuan Dayak; Kampung Tabuan Dayak	3-way intersection Access into Jalan Tabuan Dayak for southwest bound traffic only
Jalan Tun Jugah (northeast bound route); Jalan Tun Jugah (southwest bound route)
		Simpang Tiga Interchange; Bulatan Perpaduan	West; Jalan Ong Tiang Swee; Islamic Information Centre Northwest; Jalan Simpang Tiga; City centre North-Northeast; Federal Government Complex Southeast; Jalan Wan Alwi; Tabuan Jaya; Kota Samarahan	6-way roundabout with flyover connecting Northwest↔Southwest, flyover connecting Northeast→Southwest and underpass connecting Southwest→Northeast
Jalan Tun Razak (northeast bound route); Jalan Tun Razak (southwest bound route)
		The Spring Intersection	Northwest; Dedicated access road to The Spring Shopping Centre; Kenyalang Park	3-way intersection Access into The Spring for northeast bound traffic only
		Nyatoh Intersection	East; Jalan Nyatoh	3-way intersection Access into Jalan Nyatoh for southwest bound traffic only
		Suaidi Haji Arshid Intersection	Northwest; Jalan Suaidi Haji Arshid	3-way intersection Access into Jalan Suaidi Haji Arshid for northeast bound traffic only
		Datuk Bandar 2 Intersection	Northwest; Jalan Datuk Bandar 2	3-way intersection Access into Jalan Datuk Bandar 2 for northeast bound traffic only
		Datuk Bandar Intersection	Northwest; Jalan Datuk Bandar	3-way signalised intersection Traffic from Jalan Datuk Bandar cannot turn right into Jalan Tun Razak (southwest bound route)
		Chawan Intersection	Northwest; Jalan Chawan (northwest bound route) South; Jalan Chawan (southbound route)	3-way signalised intersection for Jalan Chawan (nouthwest bound route); Traffic from Jalan Tun Razak (southwest bound route) cannot turn right into Jalan Chawan (nouthwest bound route)
		Intersection	Northwest (northwest bound route) Southeast; Jalan Foochow (southeast bound route)	3-way intersection for both roads Access into Jalan Foochow (southeast bound route) for southwest bound traffic only
		Foochow 1 Intersection	Northwest; Jalan Foochow 1 City centre via Jalan Sekama Southeast; Jalan Rengas; Tabuan Jaya; Kota Samarahan	4-way signalised intersection
		Resak Intersection	Southeast; Jalan Resak	3-way intersection Access into Jalan Resak for southwest bound traffic only
		Peace Intersection	Northwest; Jalan Peace; Cut-through traffic to Jalan Pending	3-way intersection Access into Jalan Peace for northeast bound traffic only
		Sungai Apong Intersection	North; Jalan Sungai Apong; Cut-through traffic to Jalan Pending and Jalan Kwong Lee Bank South; Jalan Sungai Apong; Kampung Sungai Apong	4-way signalised intersection
		Pending Heights Intersection	Northwest; Jalan Pending Heights; Pearl Commercial Centre; Pending Heights Southeast; Jalan Noakes	3-way intersection for both roads Access into Jalan Noakes for southwest bound traffic only
Jalan Tun Razak (northeast bound route); Jalan Tun Razak (southwest bound route)
		Pending Roundabout	Northwest; Jalan Datuk Marican Salleh; City centre Padungan; Tun Salahuddin Bridge Tun Salahuddin Bridge; Petra Jaya Northeast; Jalan Pelabuhan; Pending terminal Southeast; Jalan Permai; Pending industrial estate	4-way roundabout
