= Beratok =

Coordinates: 1°19′N 110°24′E

Beratok is a small village located at 21 Mile south of Kuching, Sarawak, in Malaysia. It is located at the roadside between Tapah and Siburan. The village has more than 300 families, as well as a shophouse, food stall, multipurpose assembly hall/auditorium, primary school and other facilities.
