= Jalan Lundu–Sematan =

Road in Malaysia

Jalan Lundu–Sematan is a major highway in Kuching Division in Sarawak, Malaysia. This highway is also part of the Pan Borneo Highway network.
