= Jalan Kuching-Bau =

Road in Malaysia

Major junctions
- Northeast end: Kota Sentosa
- FT 1310 Jalan Serikin; FT 1-15 Kuching-Serian Highway
- Bau end: Southwest

Location
- Country: Malaysia
- Primary destinations: Serikin

Highway system
- Highways in Malaysia; Expressways; Federal; State

Jalan Kuching-Bau, Federal Route 1-8 and 1-9 is a federal road in Kuching Division, Sarawak, Malaysia.

== List of Interchanges ==
| Km | Exit | Interchange | To | Remarks |
|---|---|---|---|---|
| | | Kuching; Kota Sentosa Intersection | North; FT 1-15 Kuching-Serian Highway; Kuching International Airport; FT 1-15 Kuching South; FT 1-15 Kuching-Serian Highway; FT 1-15 Serian East; Kota Sentosa Commercial Centre; Sentosa Mental Hospital | 4-way Signalised Intersection |
| | | Kota Sentosa Industrial Park | | |
| | | Jalan Stapok | North; Jalan Stapok; Batu Kawa | T-junctions |
| | | Taman Siniawan | | |
| | | Siniawan | | |
| | | Bau | | |
| | | | West; FT 1310 Jalan Bau-Serikin; Serikin | |
