= Tubau =

Tubau is a surname. Notable people with the surname include:

- Eduard Tubau (born 1981), Spanish field hockey player
- María Tubau (1854–1914), Spanish actress
