= Jalan Batu Kawa–Tondong =

Road in Malaysia

Jalan Batu Kawa–Tondong is a major highway in Kuching Division in Sarawak, Malaysia. This highway is also part of the Pan Borneo Highway network.
