= Malaysia Federal Route 21 =

Road in Malaysia

Federal Route 21
- Jalan Serian–Tebedu

Route information
- Maintained by Malaysian Public Works Department
- Length: 50 km (31 mi)

Major junctions
- Northeast end: Serian
- FT 1-16 / AH150 Kuching-Serian Highway (Sg. Mamat Bridge–Serian Roundabout); Q144 Serian/Tebakang Old Link Road; Q356 Old Serian-Tebakang-Tebedu-Indonesian Border Road; Q542 Baki-Riih Road; Q154 Muara Mongkos Road
- Southwest end: Tebedu

Location
- Country: Malaysia
- Primary destinations: Tebakang. Mongkos. Kalimantan (Indonesia)

Highway system
- Highways in Malaysia; Expressways; Federal; State

Jalan Serian–Tebedu, Federal Route 21, is a major highway in Serian Division, Sarawak, Malaysia. It is a dual lane road that is maintained by PPES Works Sdn. Bhd., a subsidiary of CMS Road. It connects Serian roundabout to Tebedu. Among other major destinations branched out from this route are Riih, Tebakang and Mongkos. It is a major route to West Kalimantan, Indonesia and is frequently used by people from both Malaysia and Indonesia to cross the border. Along this road are many scattered houses, privately owned orchards, churches, primary schools and chapels. It branches out to many small villages such as Kg. Kakai and Kg. Tian. GIATMARA institution of Serian district is also located here.

The Kilometre Zero is located at Tebedu town.

== Junction lists ==
The entire route is located in Serian Division, Sarawak.

District	Location	km	mi	Name	Destinations	Notes
Serian	Serian	50.0	31.1	Serian; Serian Roundabout	FT 1 (Pan-Borneo Highway) / AH150 / FT 1-15 (Jalan Kuching–Serian (Kuching/Samarahan Boundary–Sungai Mamat Bridge)) / FT 1-16 (Sg. Mamat Bridge–Serian Roundabout) – Siburan, Kota Samarahan, Kuching; Serian Bypass – Taman Pasir FT 1 / AH150 Jalan Serian–Sri Aman – Simunjan, Sri Aman FT 1 (Jalan Bandar Serian) / AH150 – Serian Hospital, Serian town centre FT 1 (Jalan Serian–Sri Aman) / AH150 – Simunjan, Sri Aman	4-way roundabout
Serian	Serian			Serian (old link road)	Q144 Serian-Tebakang Old Link Road – Kg. Murud, Serian Fire Station	T-junctions
Serian	Serian			Old Serian-Tebakang Road	Q356 Serian-Tebakang-Tebedu-Indonesian Border Old Link Road – Kg. Tian	T-junctions
Tebedu	Tebedu			Baki-Riih	Q542 Baki-Riih Road – Pekan Baki Lama, Kg. Riih Mawang, Kg. Riih Daso, Kg. Rituh, Kg. Bantang, Kg. Pichin, Kg. Tanggak, Kg. Tubih, Kg. Tubih Mawang	T-junctions
Tebedu	Tebedu			Muara Mongkos Road	Q154 Muara Mongkos Road – Kg. Tebakang Dayak, Kg. Tebakang Melayu, Mongkos, Tebakang Bunan, Kg. Bung Padus, Kg. Bunan Gega, Kg. Bunan Punok, Kg. Gahat, Mongkos, Kg. Mapu, Kg. Mapu Tragu, Kg. Mentu Pondok, Kg. Mentu Mawang, Kg. Mentu Tapu	T-junctions
Tebedu	Tebedu			Tebedu Inland Port	Tebedu Inland Port	
Tebedu	Tebedu	0.0	0.0	Tebedu	Bandar Mutiara Land Port, Tebedu Duty Free Shop, Kg. Darul Iman, Kg. Tebedu Melayu, Kg. Tebedu Bidayuh	
Tebedu	Tebedu			Tebedu Checkpoint		
Tebedu	Tebedu			ASEAN Malaysia–Indonesia Border; Through to Trans-Malindo Highway		
1.000 mi = 1.609 km; 1.000 km = 0.621 mi: Route transition
