= Jalan Batu Kawa =

Road in Malaysia

Jalan Batu Kawa is a major highway in Kuching Division in Sarawak, Malaysia. This highway is also part of the Pan Borneo Highway network.
