= Pan-Borneo Highway =

International road route on the island of Borneo

Pan Borneo Highway
- Lebuhraya Pan Borneo (Malay)
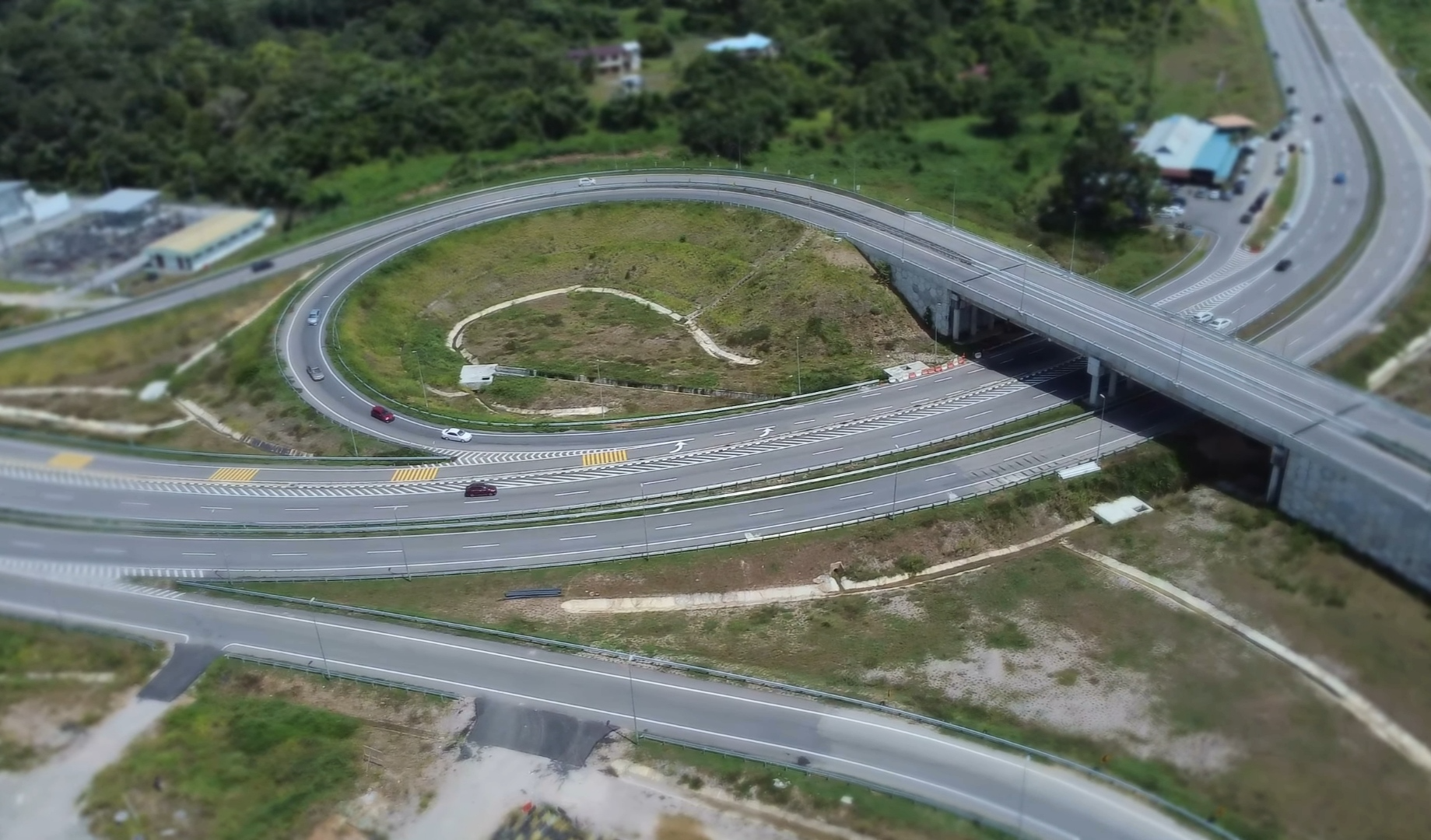
- Exit Pan Borneo controlled-access highway at the Simanggang Interchange.

Route information
- Length: 2,083 km (1,294 mi)
- Component highways: FT 1 Pan-Borneo Highway Sarawak; (Telok Melano-Sungai Tujuh, Tedungan-Pandaruan and Trusan-Merapok); FT 1 Federal Route 1 (Sabah); (Sindumin-Kudat); FT 22 Federal Route 22; (Berungis-Sandakan); FT 13 Federal Route 13; (Mile 32 Checkpoint-Tawau); Brunei Pan-Borneo Highway; (Sungai Tujuh-Kuala Lurah and Kampung Puni-Labu)

Major junctions
- Southwest end: Telok Melano, Sarawak
- Kuala Belait; Muara–Tutong Highway
- Northeast end: Serudong, Sabah

Location
- Country: Malaysia
- Major cities: Bandar Seri Begawan, Jerudong, Gadong, Berakas, Kuching, Sri Aman, Sarikei, Sibu, Bintulu, Miri, Limbang, Lawas, Sipitang, Beaufort, Keningau, Papar, Kota Kinabalu, Kota Belud, Sandakan, Tawau, Seria, Lumut, Sungai Liang, Tutong

Highway system
- Highways in Malaysia; Expressways; Federal; State
- Malaysian Federal Roads System
- Brunei National Roads System
← AH143	→ AH151

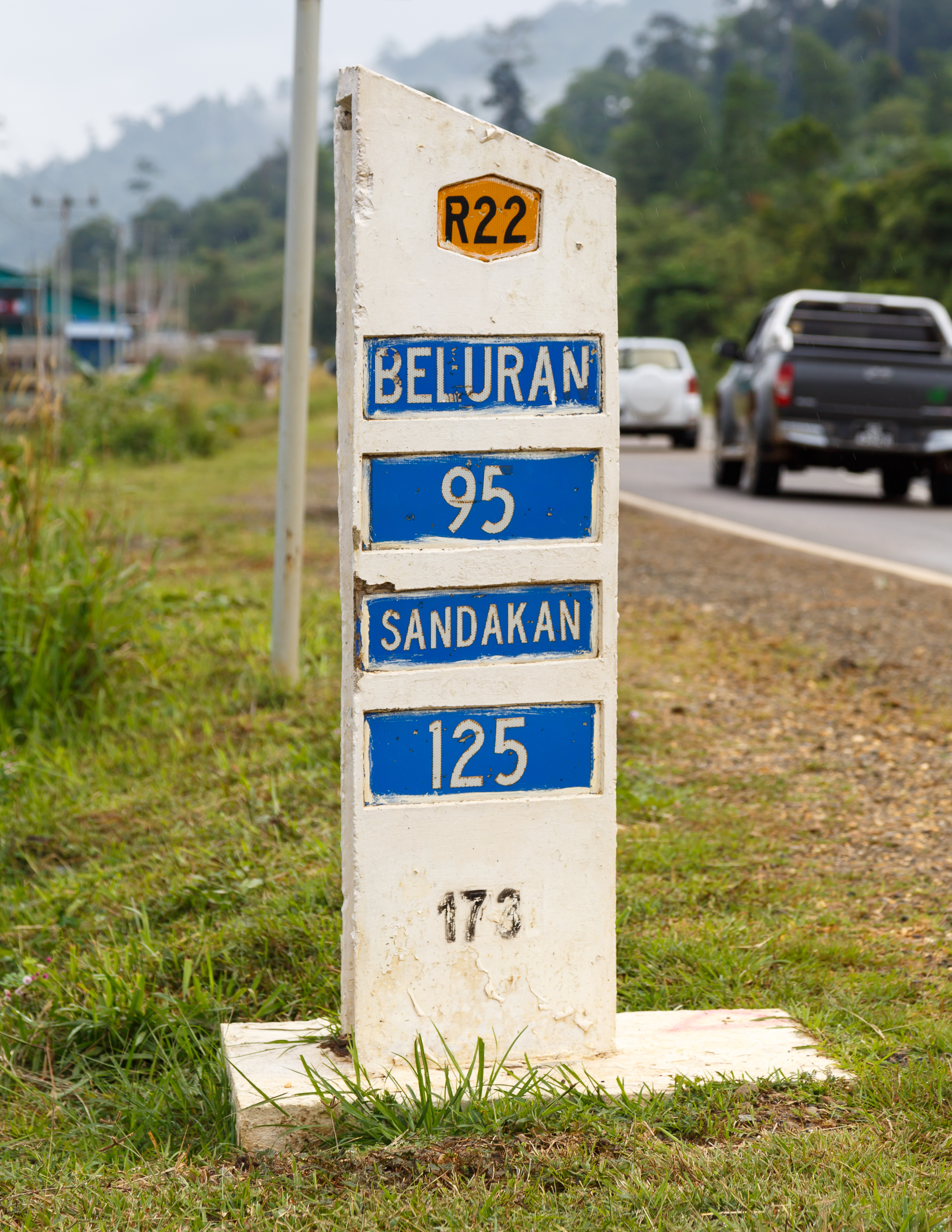
Milestone of Malaysia Federal Route 22 at Telupid in Sabah.

The Pan-Borneo Highway (Malay: Lebuhraya Pan Borneo) including the sections now known as the Pan Borneo Expressway, is a controlled-access highway on Borneo Island, connecting two Malaysian states, Sabah and Sarawak, with Brunei. The length of the entire highway is 2,083 kilometres (1,294 mi) for the Malaysian section, 168 kilometres (104 mi) for the Bruneian section.

The highway is numbered AH150 in the Asian Highway Network and as Federal Route 1 in Sarawak. In Sabah, the route numbers given are 1, 13 and 22. The upgrading of the 1,663 kilometres (1,033 mi) highway to dual carriageway is a joint project between both governments, which was started in 2015.

== Route background ==
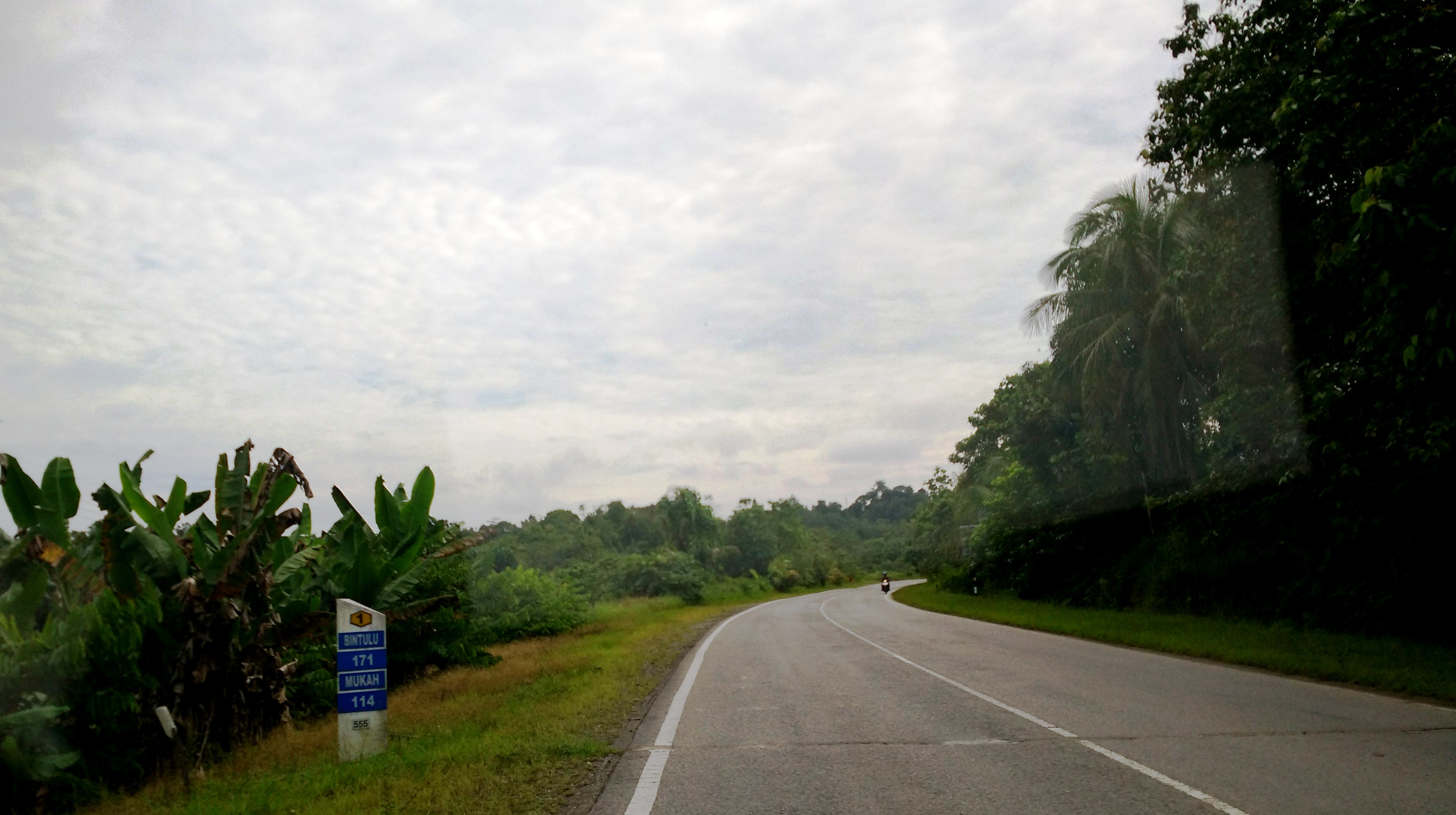
Milestone of Malaysia Federal Route 1 between Sibu and Bintulu in Sarawak.

The Pan-Borneo Highway, Asian Highway Route AH150 is supposed to be a circular highway that runs along the coastlines of Sarawak, Brunei, and Sabah. The Malaysian and Indonesian sections are linked together by a highway known as the Trans-Malindo Highway (Jalan Lintas Malindo), which is gazetted as Federal Route 21 in Malaysia. However, there is a missing link between Serudong, Sabah (Malaysia) and Simanggaris, North Kalimantan (Indonesia), which is supposed to connect Sabah with North Kalimantan.

The Malaysian section of the Pan-Borneo Highway is signposted as Federal Route 1 in Sarawak and Federal Routes 1, 22 and 13 in Sabah. The 1,077-km highway in Sarawak is divided into 92 sections altogether, and the sections are sometimes signposted along with the route number in the format xx-yy, where xx is the route number and yy is the section code. In Brunei, the highway is signposted simply as the AH150.

== History ==
The Pan-Borneo Highway was built due to the lack of the intercity highway network in the island of Borneo. In East Malaysia, the intercity highway plan only existed after the Second World War ended in 1945, after the states of North Borneo (Sabah) and Sarawak were ceded to Britain to become British Crown Colonies. By 1949, the Governor of North Borneo reported that there were 130 miles (210 km) of roads paved with asphalt, 23 miles (37 km) of other metalled roads, 225 miles (362 km) of dirt roads and 578 miles (930 km) of bridle paths.

The construction of the intercity highway network in Sabah and Sarawak intensified at a faster pace after both states participated in the Federation of Malaysia in 1963. In Sabah, the first federally-funded intercity highway project ever constructed was the Federal Route 22 from Kota Kinabalu to Sandakan, as a joint project between the Malaysian federal government with the government of Australia. Also dubbed as the "Malaysia-Australia Road Project" (MARP), the construction of the FT22 highway began in 1968 and was completed in 1982 with Telupid town became the main centre of the project headquarters.

In the meantime, the Kota Kinabalu–Papar section of the Federal Route 1 was completed in 1964, followed by the Kota Kinabalu–Kudat section which was completed in the 1970s. The entire Sabah Federal Route 1 was completed in 1981 after the construction of the final section from Papar to Sindumin was completed that year. Two years later in 1983, the construction of the Tawau–Semporna Highway (part of the FT13 highway and the entire section of the SA51 highway) was completed. The construction of the remaining section of the FT13 highway was completed in the early 1990s after the construction of Sungai Kinabatangan and Sungai Segama bridges were completed.

Meanwhile, in Sarawak, the construction of the first intercity trunk highway in Sarawak was commenced in 1965, dubbed as the "First Trunk Road". Most of the highway network in Sarawak was constructed within the decades of the 1960s to 1980s. The Lawas–Merapok–Sindumin section was completed in 1981 while the final missing link from Sibu to Bintulu was completed in 1985. However, the highway had not been fully paved with asphalt yet at that time; it was only by the end of Sixth Malaysia Plan (RMK6) in 1995 that the FT1 highway in Sarawak was fully paved.

Before 1996, all routes in the Pan-Borneo Highway network in Malaysia were state highways. After the Federal Roads Act 1959 was made effective in Sabah and Sarawak in 1984, those highways were re-gazetted as federal highways in 1996 with the route number of FT1 (from Sematan to Kudat through Brunei), FT13 (Mile 32 Sandakan to Tawau) and FT22 (Tamparuli to Sandakan). Those highways were later gazetted as a part of Asian Highway Network Route AH150.

Although some sections had been upgraded to divided highways, the Pan-Borneo Highway was notorious for its poor condition in many sections. As of 2010, 1,184 kilometres (736 mi) of the Indonesian Trans-Kalimantan Highway was built below the Asian Highway Network Class III standards (lane width: 3.0 m; design speed limit: 80 km/h). Meanwhile, the overall condition in many sections of the Malaysian section of the Highway was poor with many potholes, because most sections of the highway were built with standards as low as JKR R3 (design speed limit: 70 km/h; minimum lane width: 3.0 m). A study to upgrade the entire highway to a super two highway under JKR R5 standard (design speed limit: 100 km/h; minimum lane width: 3.5 m) was done, which was expected to cost RM16 billion. Ultimately, the Malaysian federal government had opted to upgrade the Pan-Borneo Highway to a divided highway. The upgrade works of the Pan-Borneo Highway to a divided highway is expected to be completed by 2023 for the Sarawakian section and by 2025 for the Sabahan section, with the overall cost of RM27 billion.

== Intersections along the Pan Borneo Highway ==
- Malaysia Federal Route 1 (Sarawak)#List of interchanges, intersections and towns
- Brunei Pan-Borneo Highway#List of interchanges, intersections and towns
- Malaysia Federal Route 1 (Sabah)#List of interchanges
- Kimanis-Keningau Highway#List of interchanges
- Malaysia Federal Route 22#List of interchanges
- Malaysia Federal Route 13 (Sabah)#List of interchanges

== Pan Borneo Highway Sabah ==
Under the rule of the then BN government, led by Musa Aman, UEM, MMC and Warisan Tarang Construction Sdn Bhd teamed up and formed the UEM-MMC-Warisan Tarang JV Sdn Bhd via a joint venture (JV) and received their role as project delivery partner (PDP) via Borneo Highway PDP (BHP) Sdn Bhd in 2016. Warisan Tarang owns BHP. It starts at Sindumin and ends at Serudong. In 2019, UEM announced that UEM-MMC-Warisan Tarang JV Sdn Bhd agreed to the WARISAN-Pakatan Harapan government's decision to terminate their role as PDP. Since then, the joint venture company would give up their operation and give the project to other contractors to continue, mostly to Public Works Department or Jabatan Kerja Raya (JKR). This has caused the Sabah Pan Borneo Highway project to be disrupted in the long run until September 2020.

In October 2020, a new Sabahan government was established under Gabungan Rakyat Sabah (GRS), led by Hajiji Noor, defeating Shafie Apdal's WARISAN in the state election. The leaders of GRS announced that the Sabah Pan Borneo Highway will be restarted and will not terminate the process until the Pan Borneo projects are successfully completed.

The Pan Borneo Sabah Highway consist of 3 phases, namely Phase 1, which involved Sindumin-Kota Kinabalu-Kudat, Ranau-Mile 32 Sandakan-Tawau stretch of up to 706 km, while Phase 2 involved Tamparuli-Ranau (96km) and Phase 3 involved Tawau-Kalabakan-Keningau-Kimanis (432km).

Phase 1A is planned for completion in 2026, and Phase 1B will be completed by 2029.

The contractors and WPCs involved are:

=== Phase 1A (Sipitang – Kudat – Tawau) ===
- Juta Hajat Sdn Bhd – Syarikat Kumpulan Kemajuan KK (Sabah) Sdn Bhd JV – WP01 Sindumin to Kampung Melalia (RM669 million) (28.4 km) (Start Date: 15 May 2017; Expected Completion Date: 3 December 2021; Extended Completion Date: H1 2026; Latest update 3 November 2026)
- Expowarisan Sdn Bhd – Katata Construction (Sabah) Sdn Bhd JV – WP02 Kampung Melalia to Beaufort (RM906 million) (32.9 km) (Start Date: 23 May 2018; Expected Completion Date: 3 December 2022; Extended Completion Date: May 2028)
- Tanah Permai Sdn Bhd – WP03 Beaufort to Bongawan (RM477 million) (23.4 km) (Start Date: 23 May 2018; Expected Completion Date: 3 August 2022; Extended Completion Date: H2 2026; Latest update 19 November 2026)
- Pembinaan Kekal Mewah Sdn Bhd – WP04 Bongawan to Papar (RM562 million) (23 km) (Start Date: 23 May 2018; Expected Completion Date: 3 July 2022; Extended Completion Date: H2 2026; Latest update 2 September 2026)
- Akif Jaya Sdn Bhd – WP05 Papar to Donggongon (RM323 million) (11.7 km) (Start Date: 31 July 2016; Expected Completion Date: 3 November 2020; Actual Completed Date: Aug 2022)
- Pembinaan Azam Jaya Sdn Bhd – WP06 Putatan to Inanam (RM913 million) (19.5km) (Start Date: 15 January 2018; Expected Completion Date: 3 May 2022; Extended Completion Date: Mar 2028; Latest update 14 September 2026)
- Perwira Progresif Construction Sdn Bhd – WP07 Inanam to Sepanggar (RM449 million) (11.7km) (Start Date: 15 January 2018; Expected Completion Date: 3 April 2022; Extended Completion Date: Nov 2025; Latest Update 15 September 2026)
- Sinkong Fleet JV Sdn Bhd (Sinkong Construction Sdn Bhd-Fleet Ventures Sdn Bhd JV) – WP08 Sepanggar to Berungis Roundabout (RM548 million) (9.9km) (Start Date: 23 May 2018; Expected Completion Date: 3 September 2022; Extended Completion Date: H2 2026; Latest update 17 September 2026)
- Sinkong Rastamas JV Sdn Bhd (Sinkong Construction Sdn Bhd (2nd round)-Rastamas Group JV) – WP09 Serusop to Pituru (Start Date: 20 January 2025; Expected Completion Date: 19 July 2028)
- Kontraktor Fokus Niaga Sdn Bhd – Jutawan Borneo Sdn Bhd – Wilayah Kaya Sdn Bhd JV – WP10 Pituru to Rampayan Laut (RM554 million) (32.2km) (Start Date: 6 June 2018; Expected Completion Date: 3 August 2022; Extended Completion Date: H2 2026; Latest update 2 October 2026)
- Jewel Borneo Sdn Bhd – WP15 Tawau to Kampung Check Point (Actual Completed Date: Aug 2023)
- BHO Sdn Bhd (terminated) / Mancon Berhad – WP21 Lahad Datu Bypass (RM158 million) (6.9km) (Start Date: 7 December 2016; Expected Completion Date: 3 July 2020; Actual Completed Date: Oct 2023)
- Sri Jutaya Sdn Bhd – WP27 Mile 32 to Kampung Lot M, Sandakan (RM493 million) (18.1km) (Start Date: 2 May 2017; Expected Completion Date: 3 August 2021; Actual Completed Date: Nov 2022)
- Pembinaan Kekal Mewah Sdn Bhd (2nd round) – WP28 Mile 32 to Moynod Junction (Latest Update 7 October 2026)
- Korporat Fokus Niaga JV Sdn Bhd (Kontraktor Fokus Niaga Sdn Bhd (2nd round)-Korporat Muda Sdn Bhd JV) – WP29 Moynod Junction to Sapi Nangoh (Latest Update 16 October 2026)
- Perwira Progresif Construction Sdn Bhd (2nd round) – WP30 Sapi Nangoh to Sungai Baoto (Latest Update 20 October 2026)
- Under tender – WP36 Berungis Roundabout to Kota Belud
- Under tender – WP37 Kota Belud to Langkon
- Under tender – WP38 Langkon to Matunggong
- Under tender – WP39 Matunggong to Kudat Hospital
- Under tender – WP40 Langkon to Pitas
- Under tender – WP41 Pitas to Kanibongan-Paitan Junction
- Under tender – WP42 Sandakan-Beluran Junction to Beluran
- Under tender – WP43 Beaufort to Kuala Penyu
- Under tender – WP44 Kuala Penyu to Menumbok
- Under tender - WP52 Mile 32 to Gum-Gum
- Under tender - WP53 Libaran Bypass (Retender)
- Under tender - WP54 Kg. Kalipoun to Kg. Mangkubou Laut

=== Phase 1B (Kudat – Semporna) ===
- YTO Group Sdn Bhd – WP11 Rampayan Laut to Sarang
- Pembinaan Azam Jaya Sdn Bhd (2nd round) – WP12 Sarang to Temuno (Start Date: 1 April 2024; Expected Completion Date: 31 March 2027)
- Pembinaan Azam Jaya Sdn Bhd (3rd round) – Katata Construction (Sabah) Sdn Bhd (2nd round) JV – WP13 Temuno to Bingolon
- Tekad Warisan (M) Sdn Bhd – WP14 Bingolon to Simpang Mengayau
- Under tender – WP15 Simpang Mengayau
- Advance Grow Sdn Bhd – WP16 Kampung Check Point to Sungai Kalumpang
- Kenari Express Sdn Bhd – WP17 Sungai Kalumpang to Madai
- Pembinaan Mesra Rezeki Sdn Bhd – WP18 Madai to IGN Estate
- Korporat Muda Sdn Bhd (2nd round) – WP19 IGN Estate to Agri Harvest
- Exodaya Sdn Bhd – WP20 Agri Harvest to Sepagaya
- Pembinaan Urusmesra Sdn Bhd – WP22 Lahad Datu Bypass to Kampung Sandau
- Pembinaan Kerjadi Sdn Bhd – WP23 Kampung Sandau to Sungai Takala
- Wilayah Kaya Sdn Bhd (2nd round) – WP24 Sungai Takala to Kampung Perpaduan Datuk Moh
- Jad Reka Kaya Sdn Bhd – WP25 Kampung Perpaduan Datuk Moh to Sukau
- Pembinaan Azam Jaya Sdn Bhd (4th round) – PWMW Constructions Sdn Bhd JV – WP26 Sukau to Kampung Lot M
- Sri Jutaya Sdn Bhd (2nd round) – WP31 Sungai Baoto to Telupid
- TCS Construction – WP32 Telupid to Kampung Lumou Baru
- MTD Construction Sdn Bhd – WP33 Kampung Lumou Baru to Kampung Toupos
- Menta Construction Sdn Bhd – WP34 Kampung Toupos to Kampung Nabutan
- Binaan Desjaya Sdn Bhd – Gagasan Maya Sdn Bhd JV – WP35 Kampung Nabutan to Ranau
- Under tender – WP45 Sapi Nangoh to Boitition
- Under tender – WP46 Boitition to Paitan
- Under tender – WP47 Paitan to Kanibongan-Paitan Junction
- Under tender – WP48 Lahad Datu to Bakapit
- Under tender – WP49 Bakapit to Sungai Tungku
- Under tender – WP50 Sungai Tungku to Felda Sahabat
- Under tender – WP51 Kampung Check Point to Uptown Hotel Semporna

=== Phase 2 (Ranau – Tamparuli) ===
- Under tender - WP55 Ranau to Pekan Nabalu
- Under tender - WP56 Pekan Nabalu to Kampung Kelawat
- Under tender - WP57 Kampung Kelawat to Berungis Roundabout

=== Phase 3 (Tawau – Kimanis) ===
- Under tender - WP58 Tawau to Merotai
- Under tender - WP59 Merotai to Kalabakan
- Under tender - WP60 Kalabakan to Maris River Camp
- Under tender - WP61 Maris River Camp to Maliau Basin
- Under tender - WP62 Maliau Basin to Tibow
- Under tender - WP63 Tibow to Tataluan
- Under tender - WP64 Tataluan to Pensiangan
- Under tender - WP65 Pensiangan to Nabawan
- Under tender - WP66 Nabawan to Sook
- Under tender - WP67 Sook to Keningau
- Under tender - WP68 Keningau to Crocker Range
- Under tender - WP69 Crocker Range to Kinolosodon
- Under tender - WP70 Kinolosodon to Kimanis
- Under tender - WP86 Kalabakan - Serduong - Simangaris - Malinau Link Road
- Under tender - WP87 Kalabakan to Wallace Bay

=== Phase 4 (Tenom - Ranau) ===
- Under tender - WP71 Ulu Tomani to Kuala Tomani
- Under tender - WP72 Kuala Tomani to Kemabong
- Under tender - WP73 Sipitang-Tenom Road
- Under tender - WP74A Kemabong to Chinta Mata & WP74B Bukit Sri Hartamas to Bakiau Bypass
- Under tender - WP75 Keningau Hospital to Nambayan
- Under tender - WP76 Nambayan to Bambangan
- Under tender - WP77 Bambangan to Pahu
- Under tender - WP78 Pahu to Randagong
- Under tender - WP79 Randagong to Ranau

=== Phase 5 (Tambunan - Penampang) ===
- Under tender - WP80 SMK Tambunan to Tudan Poring Road
- Under tender - WP81 Tudan Poring Road to Tamapsak
- Under tender - WP82 Tampasak to SMK Kipouvo
- Under tender - WP83 SMK Kipouvo to Donggongon
- Under tender - WP84 Mount Alab - Longkogungan - Kalanggaan - Pongobonon - Buayan - Timpangoh Link Road

=== Phase 6 (Keningau - Ranau) ===
- Under tender - WP85 Sinua to Nunuk Ragang

In September 2023, The King of Malaysia, Yang di-Pertuan Agong, Abdullah of Pahang visits Borneo Island (the journey also known as Kembara Borneo) and The King of Malaysia checking all the remaining Pan-Borneo Highway projects. The journey began in Tawau, Sabah to Telok Melano, Lundu, Sarawak. The King's Kembara Borneo journey is aims to feel driving in the Pan-Borneo Highway and also intended to known the Borneo more closer perspective.

== Pan Borneo Highway Sarawak ==
In 2015, then Prime Minister Najib Razak and then Chief Minister, Adenan Satem launched the Pan Borneo Highway project in Telok Melano. The main purpose was to upgrade the two-way lane to four lane two-way lane. 50 years ago, long-distance travelling was the only way through the two way and it was unhappy news for those who traveled to other parts of the state for working abroad and holiday seasons. It was Adenan's manifesto to upgrade the state's infrastructure. 10 contractors were involved in this project, beginning with Samling Resources Sdn Bhd (formerly JV with Ekovest before terminated in 2019 following project dispute) for works package (WPC01) which connects Telok Melano and Sematan in December 2015 as the first contractor and ended with Konsortium KPE Sdn Bhd for Sg. Tangap to Pujut Link Road in July 2016 as among the last contractors to do so. The length of this project was almost 1000 km and the cost was near RM1 billion.

Of all the projects, WPC01 Telok Melano to Sematan was the shortest length (32.77 km) while WPC02 Sematan to Sg. Moyan was the longest length (95.43 km), both went by Samling and there are 24 interchanges built at the each of projects, consists WPC02 (Bau, Lundu, KSR Mile 10 (Padawan), KSR Mile 7 (Kota Sentosa), KSR Mile 6 (Kuching Sentral/Arang Road) & KSR Mile 4 1/2 (Batu Kawa), WPC03 (Serian 1, Serian 2 & Simunjan), WPC04 (Sri Aman), WPC05 (Betong), WPC06 (Sarikei & Bintangor), WPC07 (Julau & Sibu), WPC08 (Selangau), WPC10 (Nyabau, Suai, Niah & Bakun) & WPC11 (Miri Airport, Bekenu, Beluru & Pujut Link). Contractors involved are:

- Samling Group of Companies (via Samling Resources Sdn Bhd)
- Zecon Berhad
- Kimlun Corporation Bhd
- Naim Holdings Berhad
- Gamuda Berhad
- Endaya Construction Sdn Bhd
- TRC Synergy Berhad
- Pembinaan Kuantiti Sdn Bhd
- Cahya Mata Sarawak (via PPES Works (Sarawak) Sdn Bhd (PPESW))
- Bina Puri, via Bina Puri Sdn Bhd (BPSB)
- Hock Seng Lee Berhad (HSL)
- Dhaya Maju Infrastructure (Asia) Sdn Bhd (DMIA)
- Musyati Sdn Bhd
- Mudajaya Group Berhad
- KKB Engineering Berhad
- WCT Holdings Berhad
- Shin Yang Group (via Pekerjaan Piasau Konkerit Sdn Bhd)
- Konsortium KPE Sdn Bhd (a 70:30 JV company of KACC Construction Sdn Bhd and Perbena Emas Sdn Bhd)

=== Former contractor ===
- Ekovest Berhad – JV with Samling Group terminated in 2019 following project dispute

It was conducted by Lebuhraya Borneo Utara Sdn Bhd (LBU) as a turnkey contractor. Samling Resources Sdn Bhd and Pekerjaan Piasau Konkerit Sdn Bhd (PPK) takes the two projects, WPCs 01 & 02 connects Telok Melano and Sg. Moyan & WPC10 Bintulu Airport Junction to Sg. Tangap + Kick-Off Project Nyabau to Bakun Junction. In January 2019, the first package, Telok Melano to Sematan was complete and the main contractor, Samling Resources Sdn Bhd, hands the completed road to the government to ease the Telok Melano residents to start their new trips to Sematan, Lundu, Bau, Kuching and vice versa via KM0.00, Telok Melano and ends at Sematan Roundabout, which was nearer to SMK Sematan. It was launched by then Works Minister, Baru Bian and Chief Minister (now Premier), Abang Johari Tun Openg. At the same year, the kick-off project (KOP) Nyabau to Bakun Junction was completed and officially opened at 14 October by the representators of Sarawak Public Works Department, LBU, state government and Shin Yang Group. In 2020, LBU's status as Project Delivery Partner (PDP) was terminated by then Pakatan Harapan government prior to their collapse and JKR takes over the project at the same time.

The contractors were divided into different WPCs:

=== Phase 1 (Telok Melano – Miri) ===
- Samling Resources Sdn Bhd – WPC01 Telok Melano to Sematan (TMS) (32.77 km (20.36 mi)) & WPC02 Sematan to Sg. Moyan (SSM) + KSR Interchanges (95.43 km (59.30 mi))
- Zecon Kimlun JV Consortium Sdn Bhd – WPC03 Serian Roundabout to Pantu Junction (SPJ) (75.01 km (46.61 mi))
- Naim Gamuda JV Sdn Bhd – WPC04 Pantu Junction to Batang Skrang (PJS) (89.43 km (55.57 mi))
- Endaya – TRC – PK JV Sdn Bhd – WPC05 Batang Skrang to Sg. Awik (SSA) (67.94 km (42.22 mi))
- PPESW BPSB JV Sdn Bhd – WPC06 Sg. Awik to Bintangor Junction (SAB) (64.48 km (40.07 mi))
- HSL DMIA JV Sdn Bhd – WPC07 Bintangor Junction to Sg. Kua Bridge (BSK) (75.97 km (47.21 mi))
- Musyati Mudajaya JV Sdn Bhd – WPC08 Sg. Kua Bridge to Sg. Arip Bridge (SKB) (63.67 km (39.56 mi))
- KKBWCT Joint Venture Sdn Bhd – WPC09 Sg. Arip Bridge to Bintulu Airport Junction (ABJ) (64.53 km (40.10 mi))
- Pekerjaan Piasau Konkerit Sdn Bhd – WPC10 Bintulu Airport Junction to Sg. Tangap (Nyabau Interchange) (BJT) (77.19 km (47.96 mi)) + Kick-Off Project (KOP) Nyabau to Bakun Junction (43 km (27 mi))
- Konsortium KPE Sdn Bhd – WPC11 Sg. Tangap to Pujut Link Road (TPL) (79.98 km (49.70 mi))

=== Phase 2 (Miri – Ba'kelalan – Limbang) ===
==== Proposal project ====
- Pekerjaan Piasau Konkerit Sdn Bhd (2nd round) – WP0 Miri – Marudi - Mulu - Long Lama Access Road

==== Package 01 (Mulu – Long Seridan) ====
- TBA – WP01A Mulu to Jalen Camp
- TBA – WP01B Jalen Camp to Long Seridan

==== Package 02 (Long Seridan – Nanga Medamit) ====
- TBA – WP02A Long Seridan to Long Napir
- TBA – WP02B Long Napir to Nanga Medamit

==== Package 03 ====
- TBA – WP03 Long Luping to Long Komap

==== Package 04 (Rh. Aling – Long Luping) ====
- TBA – WP04A Rh. Aling to Pagon Hill
- TBA – WP04B Pagon Hill to Long Luping

=== Phase 3 (Miri - Limbang - Lawas) ===
- TBA - WP01 Jalan Lutong Kuala Baram - Jalan Perlis Junction to Sungai Tujuh Roundabout & Kg. Masjid Kuala Baram
- TBA - WP02 Tedungan to Pandaruan
- TBA - WP03 Mengkalap to Sindumin

=== Phase 4 (Mukah) ===
==== Package 01 (Mukah & Tatau) ====
- TBA - WP01 Mukah to Selangau
- TBA - WP02 Kuala Balingian to Tatau (including proposal of the construction of Tatau Interchange)

==== Package 02 (Dalat) ====
- TBA - WP01 Kut to Tanjung Kibong

In 2021, the new Durin Bridge's parallel was opened to public, as well as Serian 1 & 2, and Mile 4 1/2 Interchanges, the first flyover to be so. Julau Interchange, one of two flyovers in Sibu, were opened to public as well as new 4 lane road towards Durin Bridge. This was followed by Sibu Interchange in May 2023, completing the entire WPC07 segment. In 2022, Nyabau Interchange, the longest flyover in Sarawak, opened to public. At the same year, Interchanges of Mile 7 and 6 in Kuching, Miri Airport and Pujut Link opened to public as well as new 4 lane road towards Permyjaya in Miri. Also, Sri Aman flyover was completed prior to Independence Day 2022 and the Selangau Interchange was completed and ending the Selangau section of WPC08 project.

== See also ==
- Malaysian Federal Roads system
