= List of people from Sarawak =

State flag of Sarawak

The following is a list of prominent people who were born in or have lived in the Malaysian state of Sarawak, or for whom Sarawak is a significant part of their identity.

== A ==
- Aaron Ago Dagang – politician, born in Kanowit, Sibu
- Abang Abdul Rahman Zohari Abang Openg – 6th Chief Minister of Sarawak, born in Limbang
- Abang Abu Bakar Abang Mustapha – former Minister in the Prime Minister's Department and former Member of Parliament (MP) for Kuala Rajang
- Abang Haji Openg – 1st Governor of Sarawak
- Abang Muhammad Salahuddin – 3rd and 6th Governor of Sarawak, born in Kampung Nangka, Sibu
- Abdul Rahman Ya'kub – 4th Governor of Sarawak and 3rd Chief Minister of Sarawak, born in Kampung Jepak, Bintulu
- Abdul Taib Mahmud – 7th Governor of Sarawak and 4th Chief Minister of Sarawak, born in Miri
- Adenan Satem – 5th Chief Minister of Sarawak, born in Kuching
- Ahmad Lai Bujang – MP for Sibuti
- Ahmad Zaidi Adruce – 5th Governor of Sarawak, born in Sibu
- Aidil Mohamad – footballer, born in Mukah
- Alan Ling Sie Kiong – lawyer and politician, born in Sibu
- Albert Kwok – leader of a resistance fighter known as the "Kinabalu Guerrillas" in Jesselton Revolt, Jesselton (present-day Kota Kinabalu in neighbouring Sabah) during Japanese occupation of British Borneo, born in Kuching
- Alexander Nanta Linggi – federal Minister of Domestic Trade and Consumer Affairs and MP for Kapit
- Alex Wong (SingleTrackMind) – independent musician and singer as well a retired professional jet ski racer
- Alice Lau Kiong Yieng – MP for Lanang, born in Sibu
- Amirul Hakim – actor, television broadcast journalist and news presenter for TV3, born in Kuching
- Angelina Chai Ka Ying, well-known as Angel – singer, a member of Dolla. Born in Kuching.
- Annuar Rapaee – Member of the State Legislative Assembly for Nangka, born in Sibu
- Anthony Lee Kok Hin – prelate
- Ashri Chuchu – footballer
- Aslina Chua – tennis player, born in Kuching
- Awang anak Raweng – Iban scout headman, born in Nanga Skrang, Sri Aman
- Azizan Saperi – footballer, born in Kuching

== B ==
- Baru Bian – politician, born in Lawas
- Billy Abit Joo – MP for Hulu Rajang
- Benedict Martin – footballer
- Benedict Sandin – Iban ethnologist, historian, and curator of the Sarawak Museum in Kuching
- Bertram of Sarawak – member of the family of White Rajahs who ruled Sarawak for a hundred years, born in Kuching
- Bolly Lapok – bishop, born in Sebemban, Sri Aman
- Bryan Nickson Lomas – diver, born in Kuching

== C ==
- Camelia – singer and model, born in Kuching
- Celestine Ujang Jilan – politician and former Speaker for the State Legislative Assembly
- Chan Seng Khai – 2nd mayor for Kuching South City Council, born in Kuching
- Chong Chieng Jen – lawyer and politician, born in Kuching
- Chong Ted Tsiung – 3rd mayor for Kuching South City Council, born in Kuching
- Clare Rewcastle Brown – British investigative journalist, born in Sarawak

== D ==
- Dan Sullivan – Australian politician, born in Kuching
- Daeloniel "Kilat Boy" Mcdelon – boxer, born in Sri Aman
- Daniel Bego – swimmer, born in Kuching
- Dayang Nurfaizah – singer, born in Kuching
- Depha Masterpiece – musician and member of Masterpiece, born in Kapit
- Dewi Liana Seriestha – singer, model, beauty queen and the first Malaysian to win the Miss World Talent award in Miss World 2014 competition, born in Kuching
- Dion Cools – Belgian-Malaysian footballer, born in Kuching
- Ding Kuong Hiing – MP for Sarikei
- Douglas Uggah Embas – Deputy Chief Minister of Sarawak and former MP for Betong
- Dunstan Endawie Enchana – former Deputy Chief Minister of Sarawak and Member of the State Legislative Assembly for Krian
- Dzulazlan Ibrahim – footballer

== E ==
- Elizabeth Jimie – diver, born in Kuching

== F ==
- Fadillah Yusof – Malaysian Works minister, born in Kampung Hilir, Sibu
- Fareez Tukijo – footballer
- Fatimah Abdullah – Sarawak State Minister, Member of the State Legislative Assembly for Dalat
- Francisca Luhong James – Miss Universe Malaysia 2020, born in Kuching

== G ==
- George Chan Hong Nam – former Deputy Chief Minister of Sarawak, born in Miri
- Gilbert Cassidy Gawing – footballer, born in Miri

== H ==
- Hafiz – singer, born in Kuching
- Hairol Mokhtar – footballer, born in Kuching
- Harrison Ngau Laing – environmentalist and former MP
- Hasbi Habibollah – MP for Limbang
- Henry Golding – British-Malaysian actor, born in Sarawak
- Henry Sum Agong – MP for Lawas
- Halimah Ali – MP for Kapar, born in Marudi

== I ==
- Idris Jala – former Minister in the Prime Minister's Department, born in Bario
- Irene Mary Chang Oi Ling - former Member of the State Legislative Assembly for Bukit Assek, born in Bau.

== J ==
- Jacob Dungau Sagan – MP for Baram, born in Long Anap, Ulu Baram
- James Chan Khay Syn – 4th Mayor of Kuching South City Council, born in Kuching
- James Chin – Professor of Asian Studies at the University of Tasmania and leading scholar of Malaysian politics and society, born in Kuching
- James Dawos Mamit – former MP for Mambong
- James Jemut Masing – Deputy Chief Minister of Sarawak
- James Wan – Australian film director, screenwriter, and producer, born in Kuching
- James Wong – 1st Deputy Chief Minister of Sarawak and former Leader of the Opposition, born in Limbang
- Jason Lo – music artist, producer, DJs, entrepreneur and former chief executive officer of Tune Talk, born in Kuching
- Jelaing Mersat – former MP of Saratok
- Jessie Chung – singer-songwriter, musician, oncologist, actress, author, naturopath, and nutritional consultant, born in Kuching
- Jimmy Raymond – footballer
- Joseph Entulu Belaun – Minister in the Prime Minister's Department and MP for Selangau
- Joseph Kalang Tie – footballer
- Joseph Salang Gandum – former MP for Julau
- Juanda Jaya – politician and former Mufti of Perlis
- Jugah Barieng – Paramount Chief of the Iban people and former Sarawak Internal Affairs Minister
- Julian Tan Kok Ping – former MP for Stampin

== K ==
- Kanang anak Langkau – national hero and soldier from the Iban-Dayak community
- Kennedy Edwin – musician and member of Masterpiece, born in Kanowit, Sibu
- Koreyoshi Kurahara – Japanese screenwriter and director, born in Kuching
- Kuda Ditta – athletics, competitor at the 1964 Summer Olympics

== L ==
- Lana Nodin – model and actress, born in Kuching
- Larissa Ping Liew – Miss World Malaysia 2018, born in Kuching
- Law Hieng Ding – former Science, Technology and the Environment minister
- Leo Michael Toyad – former MP for Mukah
- Leo Moggie – former politician and chairman board member of Tenaga Nasional
- Lily Eberwein – nationalist and women's right activist
- Liu Shan Bang – Sarawak Chinese historical warrior
- Lynda Ghazzali – entrepreneur and porcelain painter

== M ==
- Muhammad Iyad Izzuddin Muhtar – actor
- Made Katib – former Anglican bishop
- Malcom Mussen Lamoh – Member of the State Legislative Assembly for Batang Ai
- Masir Kujat – MP for Sri Aman
- Mathew Ngau Jau – Sapeh master and Malaysia's Living National Heritage. Performs and also making the musical instrument, born in Long Semiyang
- Mazwandi – footballer
- Margaret Lim – Canadian-born Malaysian book author
- Melvin Sia – actor, model and singer
- Melvin Wong Hwang Chee – entrepreneur, speaker and businessman as well founder of FanXT, born in Kuching
- Michael Manyin – Member of the State Legislative Assembly for Tebedu
- Mohd Azlan Iskandar – squash player, born in Kuching
- Mohd Effendi Norwawi – businessman, administrator and politician, former Agriculture minister

== N ==
- Nancy Shukri – Minister of Tourism, Arts and Culture and MP for Batang Sadong
- Nicholas Teo – Malaysian singer based in Taiwan, born in Kuching
- Norah Abdul Rahman – former MP for Tanjong Manis
- Neil Paul Sakai – Martial Artist, Wadoryu Karate Sensei and appointed as First Senior Zone (SEA) Instructor for Sakuukai Karate Federation, Japan

== O ==
- Ong Kee Hui – politician and founder of Sarawak United Peoples' Party, born in Kuching
- Ong Poh Lim – Malayan/Singaporean badminton player, born in Kuching
- Ong Tiang Swee – renowned Chinese leader and businessman, born in Kuching

== P ==
- Pandelela Rinong – diver, born in Bau
- Peter Chin Fah Kui – former Energy, Green Technology and Water minister and MP for Miri
- Peter John Jaban – DJ on Radio Free Sarawak and human rights campaigner

== R ==
- Reeshafiq Alwi – footballer
- Rentap – Iban-Dayak historical warrior
- Richard Riot Jaem – Special Envoy of the Prime Minister of Malaysia and MP for Serian, born in Serian
- Robert Lau Hoi Chew – former Deputy Minister for Transport and MP for Sibu, born in Sibu
- Robert Raymer – American writer and writing facilitator, born in Grove City, Pennsylvania and migrated to Kuching
- Rodney Akwensivie – Ghanaian-Malaysian footballer, born in Serian
- Rohani Abdul Karim – MP for Batang Lupar
- Rosli Dhobi – nationalist, born in Kampung Pulo, Sibu
- Rubiah Wang – MP for Kota Samarahan
- Rynn Lim – singer and actor, born in Kuching

== S ==
- Sanjay Singh – squash player, born in Miri
- Sapok Biki – boxer, born in Simunjan
- Shahrol Saperi – footballer
- Shaun Maloney – English-Scottish footballer, born in Miri
- Sherie Merlis – actress, born in Sibu
- Sim Kui Hian – cardiologist and Sarawak Local Government and Housing minister
- Simoi Peri – politician
- Stella Chung – actress and singer
- Stephen Kalong Ningkan – 1st Chief Minister of Sarawak, born in Betong
- Stephen Yong Kuet Tze – former Cabinet Minister
- Sulaiman Abdul Rahman Taib – former Deputy Minister
- Sulaiman Daud – former MP for Petra Jaya
- Syarif Masahor – Sarawak Malay historical warrior

== T ==
- Tawi Sli – 2nd Chief Minister of Sarawak
- Thane Bettany – English actor and dancer, born in Sarawak
- Tiki Lafe – former MP for Mas Gading
- Tiong Hiew King – businessman and founder of Rimbunan Hijau, born in Sibu
- Tiong King Sing – Minister of Tourism, Arts and Culture and MP for Bintulu
- Tiong Thai King – former MP for Lanang
- Traisy Vivien Tukiet – diver
- Tsai Horng Chung – Chinese-Malaysian painter, born in China and migrated to Sarawak during Japanese occupation of British Borneo
- Tsai Ming-liang – Taiwanese filmmaker, born in Kuching
- Tuanku Bujang – 2nd Governor of Sarawak

== V ==
- Valentino Bong – Filipino-Malaysian squash player, born in Kuching
- Venice Elphi – footballer, born in Kuching
- Violet Yong Wui Wui – politician

== W ==
- Wahab Dolah – former MP for Igan
- Wan Junaidi – Minister of Entrepreneur Development And Co-operatives and MP for Santubong
- Watson Nyambek – sprinter, born in Miri
- Watt Marcus – musician and member of Masterpiece, born in Sibu
- Welson Sim – swimmer, born in Kuching
- Wee Han Wen – architect and Chairman of the Miri City Council
- Wee Kheng Chiang – businessman, born in Kuching
- Wee Kheng Ming – actor
- William Nyallau Badak – MP for Lubok Antu
- Willy Edwin – musician and member of Masterpiece, born in Kanowit, Sibu
- Wilson Nyabong Ijang – Member of State Legislative Assembly for Pelagus
- Wong Ho Leng – former Opposition Leader of the Sarawak State Assembly, born in Sibu
- Wong Ling Biu – politician
- Wong Soon Koh – former Opposition Leader of the Sarawak State Assembly

== Y ==
- Yi Jet Qi – Taiwanese singer and songwriter, born in Miri
- Yong Khoon Seng – former MP for Stampin
- Yong Mun Sen (Yong Yen Lang) – artist and one of the founder of Nanyang Academy of Fine Arts in Singapore, born in Kuching

== Z ==
- Zamri Morshidi – footballer
- Zee Avi – singer-songwriter, guitarist and ukulele player, born in Miri
- Zulkifli Che Ros – weightlifter

== See also ==
- Demographics of Sarawak
