= Kuching Metro Electric City Bus =

The Kuching Metro Electric City Bus is a free, zero-emission public transit service operating in Kuching, Sarawak, Malaysia. It is managed by Henz Pacific Sdn Bhd under the oversight of the Ministry of Tourism, Creative Industry and Performing Arts Sarawak (MTCP). Launched as Malaysia's first city-wide electric bus initiative, the service serves as a strategic tourism and commuter corridor.

The service operates a single high-connectivity loop. It integrates real-time fleet tracking through the Kuching Metro App.

== Route ==
The service originates from the Kuching Open Air Market terminal in the city centre.

Route	Origin	Destination	Service type	Operator
103	Open Air Market	Semenggoh Orangutan Centre	Two-way (Outbound / Inbound)	Henz Pacific Sdn Bhd

=== Key Stops ===
The bus services 54 transit points, focusing on major commercial and tourism hubs:

- Open Air Market (bus terminal for stage bus)
- Darul Hana Bridge
- Chinese History Museum
- Borneo Cultures Museum
- The Spring Shopping Mall
- Vivacity Megamall
- CityONE Megamall
- Kuching Sentral
- Kuching International Airport
- Semenggoh Orangutan Centre

== Semenggoh Orangutan Centre Visits ==
Route 103 serves as a budget-friendly public transport option for domestic and international tourists, as the Semenggoh Orangutan Centre is the final bus stop of the line. The bus timetable provides an alternative to private taxis and is scheduled to align with the morning and afternoon feeding sessions of the sanctuary's semi-wild orangutan population.

To ensure arrival before the feeding sessions begin, passengers can utilize the following departure times from the city centre:

- Morning Feeding Session (9:00 AM – 10:00 AM): Passengers can take the 6:00 AM departure. This allows the bus to complete its run to the terminal stop with sufficient time for visitors to register at the park entrance.
- Afternoon Feeding Session (3:00 PM – 4:00 PM): Passengers can take the 12:00 PM (noon) departure to reach the park entrance before the afternoon session opens.

== Bus Features ==
- Accessibility: Low-floor entry platforms equipped with mechanical wheelchair ramps.
- Amenities: Onboard high-speed Wi-Fi, digital stop announcements, and dedicated storage racks for folding bicycles.
- Capacity: Accommodates up to 52 passengers (26 seated, 26 standing) per vehicle.

== See also ==
- Sarawak Metro
- Transport in Malaysia
