= Kuching Urban Transportation System =

Public transportation system in Kuching, Sarawak

Kuching Urban Transportation System (KUTS)
- Official logo

Overview
- Native name: Sistem Pengangkutan Bandaraya Kuching
- Owner: Sarawak Metro
- Locale: Greater Kuching, Samarahan, Serian
- Transit type: Autonomous Rapid Transit; Guided bus Bi-articulated bus
- Number of lines: 4
- Number of stations: 25
- Website: www.mysarawakmetro.com/kuts

Operation
- Operation will start: December 2026; 12 days' time
- Operator: Sarawak Metro
- Number of vehicles: 38

Technical
- System length: First phase: 59.4 km (37 mi)
- Top speed: 70 km/h (43 mph)

The Kuching Urban Transportation System (KUTS) is an under-construction Autonomous Rapid Transit (ART) system network that serves Greater Kuching, Samarahan, and Serian. It is the first metro bus system in the state of Sarawak which was touted as one of the methods to ease traffic congestion in the city of Kuching. The project is currently constructed by Sarawak Metro using state funds provided by the Development Bank of Sarawak (DBOS). The ART lines will connect Kuching to Samarahan and Serian as well as future lines to other parts of Greater Kuching.

== Former LRT proposal ==
The proposed construction of a RM10.8 billion Kuching light rapid transit (LRT) project was expected to commence by 2019 and was scheduled to be operational by 2024. It was proposed that the LRT will use hydrogen fuel cell rolling-stock with a travel speed of 70–140km/h.

The hydrogen fuel cell trains were in line with the state government's vision to develop a hydrogen economy, as part of its green initiative. Aside from hydrogen-powered trains, Kuching will also be the first city in the country to have hydrogen-powered buses.

=== Planned routes ===
On 29 March 2018, the Chief Minister of Sarawak released the routes and stations of three of the six lines with 155.2 kilometres of track to be completed in 2024, while the remaining three lines to be implemented at a later stage. A government-linked company (GLC) called Sarawak Metro Sdn Bhd had been registered to manage the LRT system.

Line	Origin – Destination	Landmark nearby proposed stations	Distance & Stations
1 Samarahan Line	Kota Samarahan to Damai via Sungai Batu,	Rembus, Kota Samarahan, Summer Mall, Aiman Mall, INTAN/SALCRA/UiTM, UNIMAS, Sarawak Heart Centre, La Promenade, Riveria, eMart, PPKS, Wisma Wan, Vivacity, Simpang Tiga, Swinburne, Jalan Tabuan, Jalan Central Timur, Police HQ, Hikmah Exchange, Jalan Hashim Jaafar, Medan Raya, Sarawak Stadium, Hospital Sarawak, Bandar Baru Samariang, Mara, Rampangi, Salak, Sg. Batu, Buntal, Santubong, Damai Central	62.4 km, 25 stations.
2 Serian Line	Serian to Senari via Siburan,	South Depot, Serian, Pasar Baki, Tapah, Beratok, Duranta, Siburan, Seratau, Beverly Park, JPJ, Kota Padawan, Everwin, Penrissen, Kuching Sentral, Kuching International Airport, BDC, Gala City, City One, Simpang Tiga, JPN, The Spring Shopping Mall, Chung Hua Middle School No. 3, Jalan Tun Razak, SMK Pending, Bintawa, Isthmus, Borneo Convention Centre Kuching, Demak Laut, Demak Laut Convention Centre, Senari Port, Bako, Muara Tebas, Deep Sea Port	82 km, 25 stations.
3 City Dispersal Line	Kuching City	Waterfront, UTC, Jalan Abell, Padungan, Padungan Central, Three Hills Park, Tanah Putih, Pending, Jalan Tun Salahudin, Darul Hana, Wisma Bapa Malaysia, Medan Raya, Jalan Hashim Jaafar, Hikmah Exchange	10.8 km, 13 stations.

Proposed route for the Kuching Urban Transportation System in 2018. Blue: Samarahan Line Red: Serian Line

==== Samarahan Line (Line 1) ====
Station Code	Working Name	Position	Local government	Interchange / Notes
SM0	Rembus (Provisional)	At-grade	MPKS	Rembus Depot, near to Kampung Rembus
SM1	Universiti	At-grade	MPKS	Near to UNIMAS Pintu Timur, walking distance to The Summer Shopping Mall
SM2	Melaban	At-grade	MPKS	Connected with Aiman Mall
SM3	Sigitin	At-grade	MPKS	Near to Wisma SALCRA, Walking distance to UiTM Samarahan
SM4	UNIMAS	Elevated	MPKS	
SM5	Heart Centre	Elevated	MPKS	Walking distance to Sarawak Heart Centre
SM6	Riveria	Elevated	MPKS	Walking distance to La Promenade Mall
SM7	Stutong	Elevated	MBKS	Near to The NorthBank by IBRACO
SM8	Wan Alwi	Elevated	MBKS	Near to Tabuan Jaya Police Complex
SM9	Viva	Elevated	MBKS	Connected with Vivacity Megamall
IS1	Simpang Tiga	Elevated	MBKS	Near to Wisma Persekutuan Public Carpark, Interchange station with 2 Serian Line
SM11	Jalan Tabuan	Elevated	MBKS	Connected with The Spring Shopping Mall
SM12	Jalan Central Timur	Elevated	DBKU	Near to Kuching Public Works Department
SM13	Jalan Badruddin	Elevated	DBKU	Connected with Sarawak General Hospital
SM14	Hikmah Exchange	Elevated	DBKU	Near to Padang Pasir, Hikmah Exchange

==== Serian Line (Line 2) ====
Station Code	Working Name	Position	Local government	Interchange / Notes
SR1	Batu 12/JPJ	Elevated	MPPadawan	Batu 12 Depot
SR2	Kota Padawan	Elevated	MPPadawan	Near to 10th Mile Bazaar
SR3	Penrissen	Elevated	MPKS	Near to SMK Wira Penrissen
SR4	Kota Sentosa	Elevated	MPPadawan	Near to Sentosa Parade
SR5	Kuching Sentral	Elevated	MBKS	Connected with bus terminal
SR6	Kuching International Airport	Elevated	MBKS	Connected to airport terminal
SR7	Pelita Height	Elevated	MBKS	Near to RH Plaza
SR8	Tun Jugah	Elevated	MBKS	Near to Emporium
SR9		Elevated	MBKS	Near to Swinburne University
IS1	Simpang Tiga	Elevated	MBKS	Near to Wisma Persekutuan Public Carpark, Interchange station with 1 Samarahan Line
SR10	Jalan Tun Razak	Elevated	MBKS	Near to Chung Hua Middle School No.3
SR11	Pending	Elevated	MBKS	Near to Puspakom
SR12	Bintawa	Elevated	MBKS	Near to Bintawa Industrial Estate
SR13	Isthmus	At-grade	DBKU	Near to Borneo Convention Centre Kuching

=== Shelving ===
However, on 1 September 2018, the Chief Minister of Sarawak announced that the project has been placed on hold, citing that the funds allocated to the project will instead be used to build basic amenities for Sarawak's rural areas. Eventually, in July 2019, the Chief Minister of Sarawak said that the new LRT project will be built using artificial intelligence (AI) technology which will remove the need for conventional rails and bringing down the cost of the project, which culminated into adopting the Autonomous Rapid Transit system from China.

== Current ART system ==
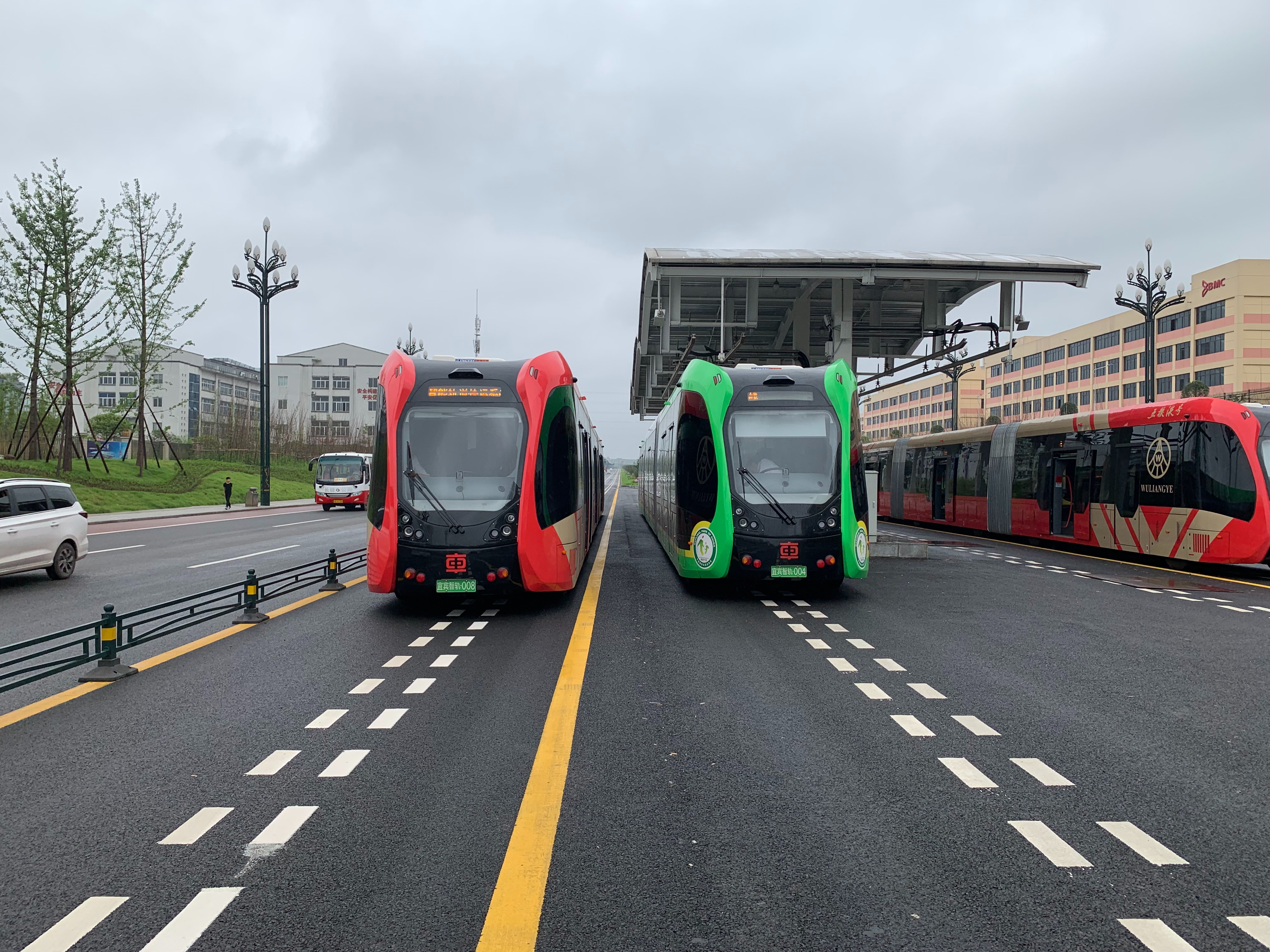
A guided bi-articulated buses at Yibin ART T1 line in China.

In September 2019, the Government of Sarawak ultimately decided to go with China's Autonomous Rapid Transit (ART) system than LRT due to its more affordable cost where the Minister of Transport for Sarawak, Dato Sri Lee Kim Shin said it will be ready by 2022. The Premier of Sarawak, Datuk Patinggi Abang Johari Abang Openg had initially promised to build the first Kuching ART soon to avoid rising costs, with Chinese companies offering their expertise to collaborate in the construction. In April 2022, the Premier disclosed to the Singaporean English daily newspaper, The Straits Times that the ART system will likely consist of 52.6 km of route and is expected to begin construction in the third quarter of the same year, with a projected operational date of 2025.

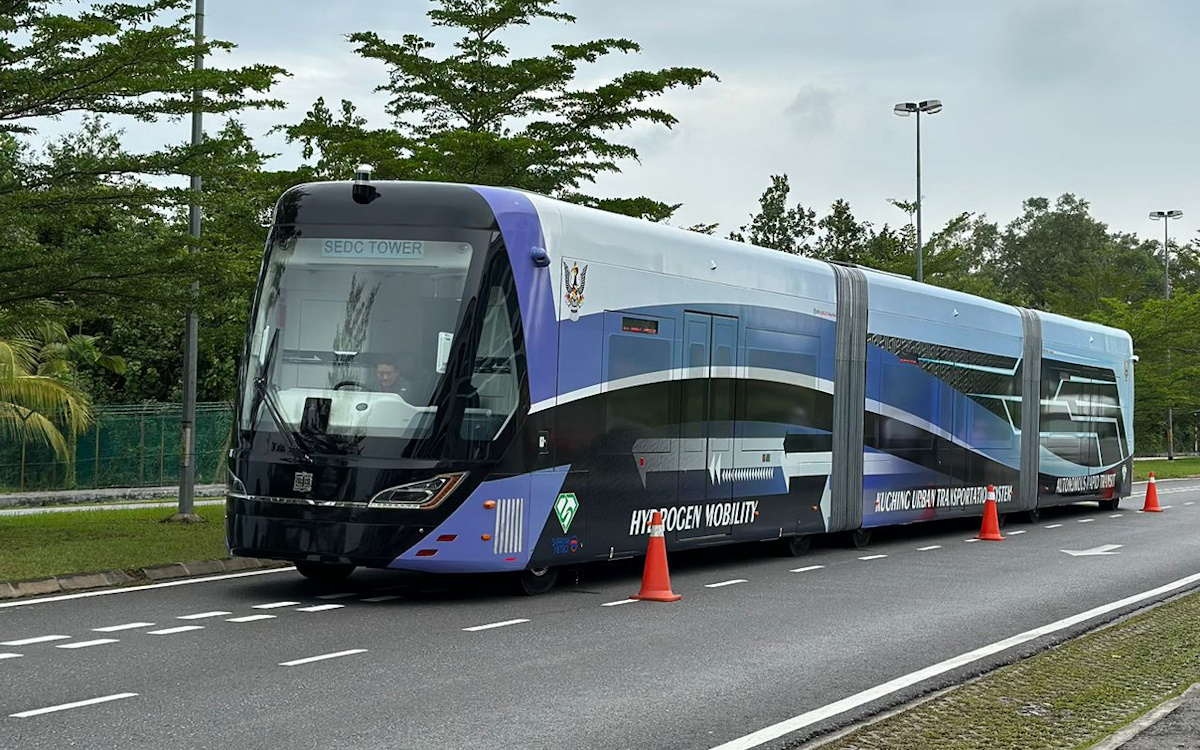
A prototype of the Kuching ART (guided bi-articulated bus powered by hydrogen) undergoing an engineering run.

In August 2023, the state received its first hydrogen-powered ART vehicle prototype and went through an engineering run for two months until September, where it then went through a proof-of-concept testing in November. Besides ART vehicles, Sarawak Metro will procure an additional 55 hydrogen buses which will serve as part of the first and last mile connectivity for the system which are still currently in trial operation since January 2020.

=== ART routes for Phase 1 ===
On 16 December 2022, the Premier of Sarawak released the Phase 1 integrated transit map of the KUTS project with a 69.9-kilometre route consisting of 3 initial lines and a total of 31 stations (with 5 provisional stations) to be completed in stages, with Phase 1 of the Blue Line scheduled to be completed in 2025 while the remaining lines are to be constructed at a later date. Previously, the Green Line had increased the number of stations from 10 to 14 stations bringing the total number of stations across the Kuching Urban Transportation System to 35 stations. Since then however, only 4 stations are now confirmed to be built while all the other 10 are either under provisional status or will be built in future phases which currently brings the Green Line down to a total distance of 10.5-kilometres for its route which shortens the entire system route down to 59.4-kilometres.

As of December 2025, the overall progress of Phase 1 of the project now stands at 35% which is still slightly behind the planned timeline due to continued construction delays. This has resulted Phase 1 of the Blue Line to now be projected to open on the fourth quarter of 2026 instead of 2025 as well as the current timeline being delayed to 2028. Nonetheless, the system will begin pilot operations for both the ART vehicles and the accompanying hydrogen-powered feeder buses by the end of 2026.

On 1 August 2026, Sarawak Metro had officiated one of its stations on the Blue Line, namely The Northbank IBRACO ART station, which was formerly designated the working name of Stutong, under a naming rights agreement which was overseen by both Sarawak Metro and IBRACO Berhad. This marks the first station in the entire network to be sponsored by a company. At the same time, two units of ART vehicles had arrived from China which will noticeably usher the project into its pilot operations sometime later at the end of the year.

Line	Origin – Destination	Landmarks of nearby proposed stations	Distance & Stations	To be completed
SM **Blue Line**	Rembus to Hikmah Exchange	**Rembus**, Summer Mall, Aiman Mall, UiTM, SALCRA, Unimas, Sarawak Heart Centre, Riveria, La Promenade Shopping Mall, Stutong, Emart Tabuan Jaya, Wisma Wan, Vivacity Megamall, JPN Kuching, The Spring, Simpang Tiga, Swinburne Sarawak University, Batu Lintang, Kuching Paragon, Sarawak General Hospital, Kuching City Mosque, Hikmah Exchange	27.6 km, 15 stations.	Phase 1: 31 December 2026 Phase 2: TBD 2027
SR **Red Line**	Kuching Sentral to Pending	Kuching Sentral, Kuching International Airport, Pelita Height, RH Plaza, GalaCity, CityOne Simpang Tiga, JPN Kuching, Jalan Tun Razak, Pending	12.3 km, 8 stations.	TBD 2027
DM **Green Line**	Pending to Yayasan Sarawak	Pending, Bintawa, Darul Hana, Wisma Bapa Malaysia, Menara Pelita, Stadium Sarawak, Yayasan Sarawak	10.5 km, 4 stations.	TBD 2028
**Bold text** denotes that the particular landmark is near the area designated to be an ART depot station.

==== Blue Line alignment ====
The Blue Line is expected to begin revenue service for Phase 1 by 31 December 2026 starting from the Rembus station until the Riveria station. Prior to this however, it will undergo a pilot operation trial around the end of 2026 to ensure smooth operating procedures for the rest of the line. This initial phase will allow Samarahan residents as well as students from UNIMAS and UiTM to travel seamlessly from their respective places around the Samarahan area, continuing along the newly built Sungai Kuap bridge solely meant for ART vehicles to The Northbank IBRACO station (formerly known as Stutong) without needing to drive. Meanwhile, Phase 2 of the Blue Line, which will begin full revenue service on an unspecified date in 2027 due to construction delays, will continue on an elevated route from Wan Alwi, Vivacity Mall, The Spring and various congested routes in Kuching before finally terminating at Hikmah Exchange station in downtown Kuching. All Phase 1 stations located in Kota Samarahan as well as Stutong will be at-grade while Phase 2 will focus more on the elevated section of the route.

**Station code**	**Station name**	**Working Name**	**Opening**	**Platform type**	**Position**	**Local** **government**	**Notes / Interchange**
**Blue Line Phase 1** (by 31 December 2026)
SM00P	TBA	**Rembus**	-	Terminus (Island)	At-grade	MPKS	**Future southern terminus.** **Provisional station.** Rembus Depot, near to Kampung Rembus, SK (A) Ibnu Khaldun
SM01	TBA	Universiti	Q4 2026	Island	At-grade	MPKS	**Current southern terminus.** Exit to Uptown Samarahan, Taman Desa Ilmu, Pintu Timur UNIMAS, Kolej Kenanga, walking distance to The Summer Shopping Mall
SM02	TBA	Melaban	Q4 2026	Island	At-grade	MPKS	Exit to Aiman Mall, Melaban Commercial Centre, Jalan i-MAS Village
SM03	TBA	Sigitin	Q4 2026	Island	At-grade	MPKS	Exit to Wisma SALCRA, Uni Alam Commercial Centre, walking distance to INTAN Sarawak
SM04	TBA	UNIMAS	Q4 2026	Island	At-grade	MPKS	Exit to UNIMAS Main Gate, Uni Square Commercial Centre, walking distance to Everwin Centre, Hospital Pengajar UNIMAS
SM05	TBA	Sarawak Heart Centre	Q4 2026	Island	At-grade	MPKS	Exit to Central City, Eden-on-the-Park Nursing Care Residence, walking distance to Sarawak Heart Centre, Samarahan Country Club, future **Interchange station** with a future line
SM06	TBA	Riveria	Q4 2026	Island	At-grade	MPKS	Exit to La Promenade Mall, Jalan Tiya Vista, walking distance to Riveria Square
SM07	The Northbank IBRACO	Stutong	Q4 2026	Island	At-grade	MBKS	Connected with Northbank Business Exchange (NBX), Regency Specialist Hospital Kuching, walking distance to Avona Residence, Tunku Putra - HELP International School Collaboration with IBRACO under station naming rights programme
**Blue Line Phase 2** (TBD 2027)
SM08	TBA	Wan Alwi	2027	Island	Elevated	MBKS	Exit to Stutong Parade Commercial Centre, Tabuan Jaya Police Housing Complex, walking distance to Lodge International School
SM09	TBA	Vivacity Mall	2027		Elevated	MBKS	Connected with Vivacity Megamall, exit to Milan Square, Milano Eight Condominium
SM10	TBA	Simpang Tiga	2027	Double; Island	Elevated	MBKS	Walking distance to Bangunan Sultan Iskandar, JPN Sarawak, Kenyalang Park Post Office, **Interchange station** with the SR10 **Red Line**
SM11	TBA	The Spring	2027		Elevated	MBKS	Connected with The Spring Shopping Mall, ST3 Shopping Mall, Citadines Uplands Hotel, walking distance to Masjid Darul Ittihaad Kenyalang Park
SM12	TBA	Batu Lintang	2027		Elevated	DBKU	Exit to Kuching Paragon, Batu Lintang Food Court, Kuching Public Works Department, walking distance to Wisma Saberkas
SM13	TBA	Sarawak General Hospital	2027		Elevated	DBKU	Exit to Sarawak General Hospital, walking distance to SMK Green Road (via Jalan Medan Temple), future **Interchange station** with the YL **Yellow Line**
SM14	TBA	**Hikmah Exchange**	2027	Terminus (Island)	Elevated	DBKU	**Northern terminus.** Connected with Hikmah Exchange, exit to Borneo Cultures Museum, Electra House Shopping Mall, Kuching City Mosque, Jalan Power, future **Interchange station** with a future line

==== Red Line alignment ====
The Red Line is expected to begin revenue service on an unspecified date sometime in 2027. It is currently unknown whether this line will open simultaneously with Phase 2 of the Blue Line. At the moment, this line will have 8 stations but is expected to expand in the near future, with expansions to 12th Mile (Batu 12), Serian, Kuching Deep Sea Port and possibly the brand new Kuching International Airport located at Tanjung Embang. It will also be connected with the bus terminal as well as the current Kuching International Airport, which will play an important role in providing easy transportation for those leaving or coming from either one of those terminals. All stations on this initial line are expected to be elevated stations.

**Station code**	**Station name**	**Working Name**	**Opening**	**Platform type**	**Position**	**Local** **government**	**Notes / Interchange**
SR01	TBA	JPJ	-	-	-	MPPadawan	To be built in future phases
SR02	TBA	Kota Padawan	-	-	-	MPPadawan	To be built in future phases
SR03	TBA	Penrissen	-	-	-	MPKS	To be built in future phases
SR04	TBA	Kota Sentosa	-	-	-	MPPadawan	To be built in future phases
SR05	TBA	Kuching Sentral	2027	Side	Elevated	MBKS	Exit to bus terminal, walking distance to Farley Shopping Mall, Westfield Points Commercial Centre, future **Interchange station** with a future line
SR06	TBA	Kuching International Airport	2027	Island	Elevated	MBKS	Connected with airport terminal via walkway to Departure Hall
SR07	TBA	Pelita Height	2027	Island	Elevated	MBKS	Exit to RH Plaza, Wisma Elica, voco Hotel Kuching
SR08	TBA	Tun Jugah	2027	Island	Elevated	MBKS	Exit to Emporium Kuching, Premier 101 Plaza
SR09	TBA	Swinburne	2027	Island	Elevated	MBKS	Exit to Swinburne University of Technology Sarawak, walking distance to KWSP Kuching, Jalan Uplands Commercial Centre
SR10	TBA	Simpang Tiga	2027	Double; Island	Elevated	MBKS	Walking distance to Bangunan Sultan Iskandar, JPN Sarawak, Kenyalang Park Post Office, **Interchange station** with the SM10 **Blue Line**
SR11	TBA	Jalan Tun Razak	2027	Island	Elevated	MBKS	Exit to Shell Jalan Tun Razak, Chung Hua Middle School No.3, Lorong Foochow shoplots
SR12	TBA	**Pending**	2027	Terminus (Island)	Elevated	MBKS	**Northern terminus.** Connected with Neu Pendington, walking distance to Pending Industrial Estate, **Interchange** **station** with the DM01 **Green Line**

==== Green Line alignment ====
The Green Line is expected to begin full revenue service on an unspecified date in 2028 due to construction delays, with eight confirmed stations and four provisional stations being built at a later date in order to complement future developments which brings a total number of fourteen stations. The first phase is expected to start construction around 2027 and will allow passage to the Sarawak Sports Complex while the rest of the stations are provisional due to current low demand. As of July 2026, the entirety of Phase 2 will be built at a later phase as road works in most of these areas are still ongoing. All stations on this route, except for Pending station, are expected to be at-grade. However, there is a small section from Santubong station and the Damai Golf Course station which will be elevated as to reduce the gradient of the route so that it does not exceed the maximum of 6% for an ART lane.

**Station code**	**Station name**	**Working Name**	**Opening**	**Platform type**	**Position**	**Local** **government**	**Notes / Interchange**
**Green Line Phase 1** (TBD 2028)
DM01	TBA	**Pending**	2027	Terminus (Island)	Elevated	MBKS	**Southern terminus.** Connected with Neu Pendington, walking distance to Pending Industrial Estate, **Interchange** **station** with the SR12 **Red Line**
DM02P	TBA	Darul Hana	-	Island	At-grade	DBKU	**Future provisional station.** Near to Masjid Darul Hana, Darul Hana Housing Complex
DM03	TBA	Wisma Bapa Malaysia	2028	Island	At-grade	DBKU	Halt station. Walking distance to Wisma Bapa Malaysia, Sarawak Performing Arts Centre
DM04P	TBA	Menara Pelita	-	Island	At-grade	DBKU	**Future provisional station.** Walking distance to Pelita Tower, Kompleks Satria Pertiwi
DM05	TBA	Stadium	2028	Island	At-grade	DBKU	Halt station. Connected with the Sarawak Sports Complex
DM05A	TBA	Yayasan Sarawak	2028	Island	At-grade	DBKU	Halt station. Near to Yayasan Sarawak, MARDI
**Green Line Phase 2** (To be built in future phases)
DM06	TBA	-	-	Island	At-grade	DBKU	**Provisional station.** Future **Interchange station** with a future line
DM07	TBA	Bandar Baru Samariang	-	Island	At-grade	DBKU	Halt station. Connected with Bandar Baru Samariang Commercial Centre
DM07AP	TBA	Pasir Panjang	-	Island	At-grade	DBKU	**Provisional station.** Near to Department of Agriculture Research Station Rampangi, Mutiara Damai Housing Complex
DM08	TBA	Sungai Batu	-	Island	At-grade	DBKU	Halt station. Sungai Batu Depot. Near to Sungai Bedaun Housing Complex
DM08AP	TBA	Cove 55	-	Island	At-grade	DBKU	**Provisional station.** Connected with Cove 55 Hotel
DM09	TBA	Santubong	-	Island	At-grade	DBKU	Halt station. Near to Kampung Santubong
DM09A	TBA	Damai Golf Course	-	Island	At-grade	DBKU	Halt station. Near to Damai Golf & Country Club, Santubong National Park
DM10	TBA	**Damai Sentral**	-	Terminus (Island)	At-grade	DBKU	**Northern terminus.** Halt station. Connected with Sarawak Cultural Village, walking distance to Damai Beach, Damai Lagoon Resort

=== Planned ART routes for Phase 2 ===
While not currently under construction, the Sarawak Deputy Premier Dr. Sim Kui Hian announced the planned expansion of the KUTS project for Phase 2 starting with the Yellow Line, which runs from an interchange station with the Blue Line at Sarawak General Hospital to Moyan. An extension of the route to Bau has been planned out in advance but will only take fruition once Phase 2 undergoes construction. The remaining routes for Phase 2 are to be announced at a later date.

Line	Origin – Destination	Landmarks of nearby proposed stations	Distance & Stations	To be completed
YL **Yellow Line**	Sarawak General Hospital to Moyan	Sarawak General Hospital, AEON Mall Kuching Central, The Podium, Sunny Hill School, Maong Bazaar, 3rd Mile Wet Market, Cyberjaya College Kuching, IKEA Kuching, Pines Square, MJC, Emart Batu Kawa, Desa Wira, Ang Cheng Ho Multipurpose Hall, Batu Kawah Riverbank Park, Emart Moyan, Moyan Square	TBA.	TBA

== See also ==
- Klang Valley Integrated Transit System
- Bi-articulated bus
- Iskandar Malaysia Bus Rapid Transit
- Sarawak Railway Line
- Kota Kinabalu Line
