= Hanwen =

Hanwen may refer to:

- Classical Chinese (文言文 wényán wén, sometimes 漢文 hànwén)

Hanwen is also the Mandarin pinyin transcription of various Chinese given names (e.g. 漢文 Hànwén; 涵文 Hánwén). People with these names include:

- Edmond Leung (born 1971), Hong Kong singer-songwriter
- Deng Hanwen (born 1995), Chinese football defender
- Wee Han Wen, Malaysian local politician in Miri, Sarawak
- Han-Wen Nienhuys, Dutch software developer
