= Batu Lintang =

Batu Lintang may refer to:

- Batu Lintang (state constituency), represented in the Sarawak State Legislative Assembly
- Batu Lintang camp, a Japanese internment camp holding both Allied POWs and civilians during the Second World War
