= Pending =

Pending may refer to:

- Pending (district), located in Kuching, Sarawak, Malaysia
- Pending (state constituency), represented in the Sarawak State Legislative Assembly
- Pending LRT station, a light rail station in Bukit Panjang, Singapore
- Pending, the status of an event or decision-making process prior to reaching a result
