= Melvin Wong Hwang Chee =

Malaysian entrepreneur and businessman

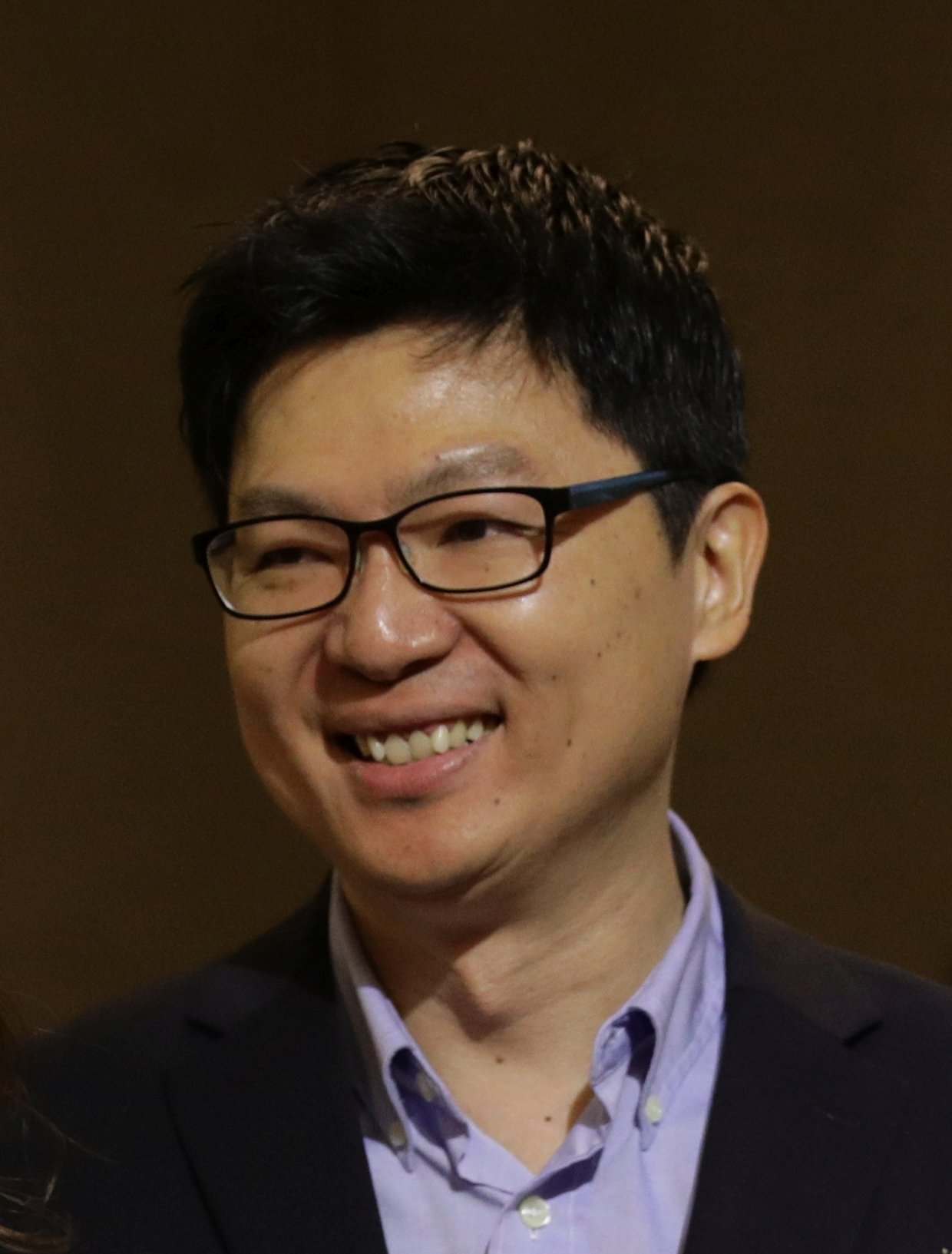
- Born: Melvin Wong Hwang Chee; 30 July 1978 (age 47)
- Occupations: Entrepreneur, speaker, businessman
- Years active: 2005–present
- Known for: FanXT

Melvin Wong Hwang Chee (born 30 July 1978) is an entrepreneur, speaker and businessman. He was the founder of FanXT, a fantasy sport platform for The Football Association, MotoGP and Formula One.

== Career ==
Wong started his company Just Mobile in 2005 which expanded into a fantasy sports platform known as FanXT. In 2016, Grand Perfecta Inc., a Tokyo-based company, acquired FanXT via its U.S. subsidiary, Sports Perfecta Inc.

In 2012, Wong represented his country at Global Entrepreneurship Week, organised by United States Department of State, which was held at The White House in Washington, D.C.. In 2013, Melvin was a speaker at science, technology and entrepreneurship event together with Assistant Secretary of State for Oceans and International Environmental and Scientific Affairs, Kerri-Ann Jones at Universiti Teknologi MARA System in Malaysia. He was also a speaker at The Global Entrepreneurship Summit which was officiated by President Obama and was held in 2013.

Wong was the winner of MyEG Make The Pitch Season 2, a business reality show that was aired on 8TV (Malaysia) in 2012. Wong won a sum of MYR 1 million investment money from MyEG which he later turned down. He was also among the semi-finalists at Startup Asia business TV reality show aired on Channel News Asia in 2014.

Wong has won several local and international awards including the TiE's All-Asia Business Plan Competition in 2012 and Malaysia's National Intellectual Property Award, organised by MyIPO in 2014. Melvin's FanXT was a finalist in The Football Business Awards 2014 together with Bloomberg Sports, FIFA and Sky Deutschland. Currently, Melvin is a mentor with The South Bay Entrepreneurial Center in California.

== Awards ==
- National Intellectual Property Awards – Malaysia – (2014)
- GIST – U.S. – (2013)
- TiE Global All-Asia Business Competition – India – (2012)
- MSC Asia Pacific ICT Awards (APICTA) – Malaysia – (2011)
- MIPTV Finalist for Content 360 Competition – MIPTV – France – (2010)
- InnOvation Malaysia Awards – Malaysia – (2009)
- Mobile Monday Global Summit Peer Awards – Malaysia – (2008)
- MSC Mobile Content Competition – Malaysia – (2006)
