= Kota Kinabalu Line =

Transit network in Kota Kinabalu, Malaysia

The Kota Kinabalu Line (Malay: Laluan Kota Kinabalu) is a proposed light rapid transit (LRT) system network in Kota Kinabalu, Malaysia, as one of the method to ease traffic congestion in the city. The proposal has been considered, and as reported in the government website, the project was in the ground breaking process under the Kota Kinabalu development plan. The current under construction project of the Aeropod rail station in Tanjung Aru also has made a provision for LRT in their plan.

In early 2017, an assemblyman from Inanam Roland Chia stressed the importance of having an LRT system to solve the present traffic congestion in Kota Kinabalu which is getting worse. Proposing to the government to look at examples from other developed countries cities such as in Australia and the United Kingdom which provide rail transport on the basis of need rather than population size. As a response, the state government is looking to study the proposal with the state capital mayor who claims the project must be effective and bring economic returns. Following the change of government in 2018, the new federal government through Deputy Works Minister Mohd Anuar Mohd Tahir has stated in early 2019 that LRT will still be on the state development plan. The priority will be given first to complete the road networks in Sabah. On 27 August 2019, the Kota Kinabalu City Hall (DBKK) has submitted a proposal to build LRT or mass rapid transit (MRT) to the federal government. The city authorities are currently waiting for budget on the project.

== See also ==
- Kuching Line
