= Yayasan Sarawak =

Sarawakian statutory body

Sarawak Foundation
- Yayasan Sarawak

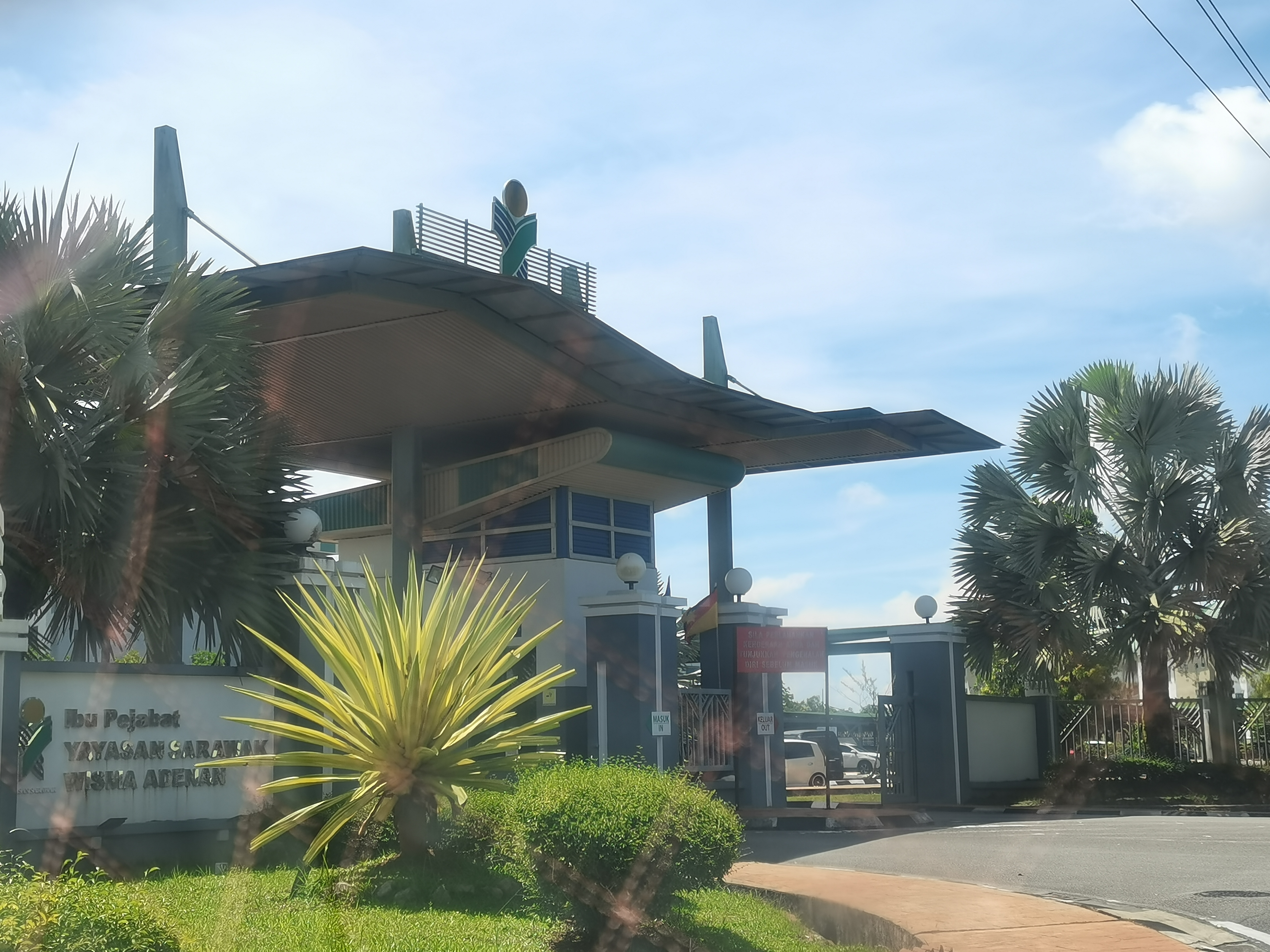
- Yayasan Sarawak headquarters at Petra Jaya
- Formation: 27 May 1971
- Type: State statutory body
- Location: Sarawak, Malaysia
- Chairman: YAB Datuk Patinggi (Dr) Abang Haji Abdul Rahman Zohari bin Tun Datuk Abang Haji Openg
- Director: Haji Azmi Haji Bujang
- Website: Yayasan Sarawak

The Sarawak Foundation, also known as Yayasan Sarawak, is a statutory body set up to help improve the quality of education of Sarawak. It is often associated with the provision of scholarships and study loans.

== History ==
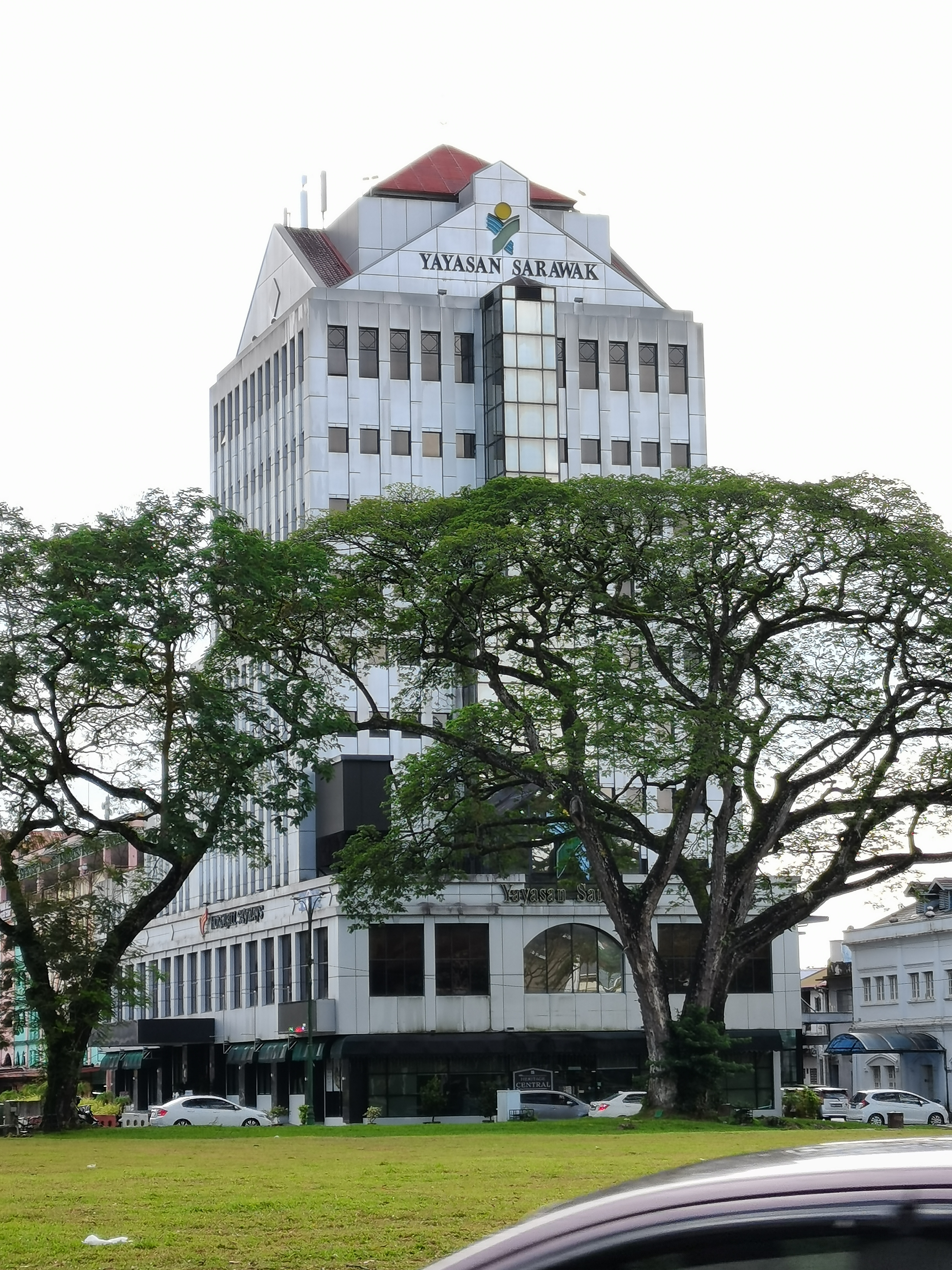
Yayasan Sarawak Kuching regional office at Jalan Masjid.

The Sarawak Foundation was established on 21 May 1971 through the Yayasan Sarawak Ordinance 1971 by the government of Sarawak. The idea to set up the foundation was mooted by Abdul Rahman Ya'kub, the chief minister of Sarawak at the time. Rahman Ya'kub aimed to improve the standard of education amongst the people of Sarawak, and became the first chairman of the Sarawak Foundation. Datuk Amar Abang Haji Yusuf Puteh, the State Secretary at that time, was appointed as the secretary to the Sarawak Foundation.

As soon as the foundation was established, it was allocated logging concessions. The foundation received RM 5.7 million from logging premiums. In 1978, Yayasan Sarawak received RM 26.9 million in total revenues and spent RM 12.0 million. Yayasan Sarawak also received 20% shares from Utama Banking group (a subsidiary of Cahya Mata Sarawak Berhad). In 1979, Yayasan Sarawak gave scholarships and loans to 377 students. From these students, 126 of them graduated from various fields such as engineering, economy, law, and others.

As of 2014, a total of RM 600 million was disbursed 150,000 students and benefactors cumulatively. The foundation also set aside RM 60 to RM 70 million per year to help needy students.

In 2019, Sarawak government started on a scheme to help Sarawakians to pay Perbadanan Tabung Pendidikan Tinggi Nasional (PTPTN) (a study loan introduced by the Malaysian federal government) for those have difficulties in repayments. In 2022, Sarawak Foundation dished out RM 3.5 million to PTPTN. In 2019, the Sarawak government started a plan to build international schools throughout Sarawak. The first international school was launched in Petra Jaya in 2022.

As of May 2022, Yayasan Sarawak owns Swinburne University of Technology Sarawak Campus, Curtin University, Malaysia, University of Technology Sarawak, i-CATS University College and Centexs training centre.

== Activities and core businesses ==
Yayasan Sarawak offers several scholarship programmes for local and foreign universities admissions, including Yayasan Sarawak Tun Taib Scholarship for science, technology, engineering, and mathematics (STEM) subjects, Sarawak Tunku Abdul Rahman Scholarship Foundation (YBSTAR) for non-STEM subjects, UNIMAS medical programme scholarship, Sarawak Foundation Local Scholarship for secondary school studies, and admission assistance to tertiary or other institutions of higher learning.

Yayasan Sarawak also offers several loans such as local education scholarship loan, overseas education loan, technical training scholarship loan and Sarawak higher education loan (HiED). HiED is specifically offered for those pursuing engineering and quantity surveying subjects.

=== Programs and assistance ===
1. Yayasan Sarawak Exchange Program
2. Community Education Program
3. School Uniform Assistance
4. High Performing Rural Schools (HiPERS)
5. Reading Materials Assistance Program
6. Yayasan Sarawak Student Excellence Awards
7. Sarawak Chief Minister Special Awards (AKKMS)
8. YS-JPNS Collaboration Program

=== Loan repayment ===
1. Loan Repayment Method
2. Loan Repayment Incentive
