= ST3 Shopping Mall =

Shopping mall in Kuching, Sarawak, Malaysia

- Location: Kuching, Kuching Division, Sarawak, Malaysia
- Coordinates: 1.536040°N 110.356101°E
- Address: 64, Jalan Simpang Tiga, Kampung Kenyalang Park, Kuching, Sarawak, Malaysia
- Opened: December 2012
- Developer: Kenbest Sdn. Bhd.
- Manager: The Ascott
- Owner: Kenbest Sdn. Bhd.
- Num. of stores: 200+
- Num. of anchor tenants: 1 (Citadines Uplands Serviced Apartments)
- Floor area: 250,000 sq ft (23,000 m^{2})
- Floors: 4
- Public transit: SM11 The Spring (to be completed)
- Website: ST3 Shopping Mall; Citadines Uplands Kuching

Simpang Tiga Three Shopping Mall, more commonly known as ST3 Shopping Mall, is an integrated shopping mall and serviced apartment complex in Kuching, Sarawak, Malaysia. Located at Jalan Simpang Tiga, it was opened in December 2012. The 8-storey serviced apartments sitting above the shopping mall is known as "Citadines Uplands Kuching Apartments" which is operated by The Ascott, a subsidiary of CapitaLand.

It has one anchor tenant which is Citadines Uplands Serviced Apartments. It is also home to an office of the Sarawak Rural Water Supply Department (Malay: Jabatan Bekalan Air Luar Bandar Sarawak).

ST3 Shopping Mall has the capacity to house shopping outlets spread out over four floors.

== Citadines Uplands Serviced Apartments ==
Citadines Uplands Serviced Apartments consists occupies the top 8 floors of the ST3 integrated complex and has a total of 215 rooms. The property represents The Ascott Limited's first foray into the Malaysia market. Residential facilities include a swimming pool, children's wading pool, gymnasium, residents' lounge, launderette and meeting room.

== Retail outlets ==
Smart Plus grocery store, K11 Karaoke and some restaurants can be found inside ST3 Shopping Mall.

== Location ==
ST3 Shopping Mall is situated before the Jalan Simpang Tiga flyover. It also lies directly opposite Kuching's largest shopping mall, The Spring Shopping Mall. In addition to its close proximity to both the Kuching International Airport and the city's central business district, ST3 Shopping Mall is also situated near the Swinburne University of Technology and various government offices.

== Transportation ==
ST3 Shopping Mall is served by buses K8 and K11 of the Kuching City Public Link. Alternatively, the mall can also be accessed by a linked pedestrian bridge to The Spring Shopping Mall.

Once completed, the mall will also be connected using the Kuching Urban Transportation System via SM11 The Spring ART station on the Blue Line which will be located across the outskirts of the mall.

== See also ==
- List of shopping malls in Malaysia
