= See Chee How =

Malaysian politician and lawyer

Yang Berhormat Tuan See Chee How MLA
- 施志豪

State Vice Chairman of the People's Justice Party of Sarawak
- In office 2011 – 24 February 2020
- President: Wan Azizah Wan Ismail (2011–2018); Anwar Ibrahim (2018–2020)
- State Chairman: Baru Bian
- Succeeded by: Michael Teo Yu Keng

Member of the Sarawak State Legislative Assembly for Batu Lintang
- Incumbent
- Assumed office 16 April 2011
- Preceded by: Voon Lee Shan (PR–DAP)
- Majority: 8,381 (2011); 4,385 (2016); 93 (2021)

Personal details
- Born: See Chee How Kuching, Sarawak, Malaysia
- Citizenship: Malaysian
- Party: People's Justice Party (PKR) (–2020); Parti Sarawak Bersatu (PSB) (2020–2022); Independent (since 2022)
- Other political affiliations: Pakatan Rakyat (PR) (2008–2015); Pakatan Harapan (PH) (2015–2020)
- Education: University of London
- Occupation: Politician
- Profession: Lawyer

See Chee How (Chinese: 施志豪; pinyin: Shī zhìháo), is a Malaysian politician and lawyer who has served as Member of the Sarawak State Legislative Assembly (MLA) for Batu Lintang since April 2011. He is presently an independent. He was a member of the opposition Parti Sarawak Bersatu (PSB) and People's Justice Party (PKR), a component party of the Pakatan Harapan (PH) opposition coalition. He also served as State Vice Chairman of PKR of Sarawak before his sacking from the party.

== Political career ==
Between August 2018 and February 2020, See served as special officer representing Minister of Works of Malaysia, Baru Bian, in Sarawak on a pro bono basis.

See was sacked from PKR in mid-April 2020 having been alleged to have supported the camp belonging to former party deputy president, Mohamed Azmin Ali, in the events leading up to the 2020 Malaysian constitutional crisis.

On 29 May 2020, president of United Sarawak Party (PSB), Wong Soon Koh, announced that See has been accepted as a member of PSB. See's addition to PSB comes as over 20 other former PKR members, either sacked or having resigned from the party, also received their acceptance into PSB.

On 14 August 2022, Speaker of the Sarawak State Legislative Assembly Mohamad Asfia Awang Nassar announced that See had informed him about leaving PSB two days prior on 12 August 2022 without adding reasons. This left PSB only three MLAs and the Opposition five in addition with another two from PH. His seating in the state assembly was also rearranged and moved away from the opposition seats.

See has said to reporters in February 2024 that he will remain as an independent MLA and would not join any political party, until the next state election.

== Election results ==
Parliament of Malaysia
Year	Constituency	Candidate	Votes	Pct	Opponent(s)	Votes	Pct	Majority	Ballots cast	Turnout
1990	P154 Mas Gading	See Chee How (DAP)	1,637	8.08%	Patau Rubis (SNAP)	10,924	54.41%	3,232	20,253	68.46%
1990	P154 Mas Gading	See Chee How (DAP)	1,637	8.08%	Wilfred Rata Nissom (IND)	1,687	8.08%	3,232	20,253	68.46%
2008	P196 Stampin	See Chee How (PKR)	2,198	5.10%	Yong Khoon Seng (SUPP)	21,966	51.01%	3,070	43,060	65.30%
2008	P196 Stampin	See Chee How (PKR)	2,198	5.10%	Voon Lee Shan (DAP)	18,896	43.88%	3,070	43,060	65.30%

Sarawak State Legislative Assembly
Year	Constituency	Candidate	Votes	Pct	Opponent(s)	Votes	Pct	Ballots cast	Majority	Turnout
2011	N11 Batu Lintang	See Chee How (PKR)	13,235	72.01%	Sih Hua Tong (SUPP)	4,854	26.41%	18,475	8,381	66.38%
2011	N11 Batu Lintang	See Chee How (PKR)	13,235	72.01%	Lina Soo (IND)	290	1.58%	18,475	8,381	66.38%
2016	N11 Batu Lintang	See Chee How (PKR)	10,758	61.61%	Sih Hua Tong (SUPP)	6,373	36.50%	17,613	4,385	62.67%
2016	N11 Batu Lintang	See Chee How (PKR)	10,758	61.61%	Lina Soo (STAR)	331	1.89%	17,613	4,385	62.67%
2021	N11 Batu Lintang	See Chee How (PSB)	4,420	35.86%	Sih Hua Tong (SUPP)	4,327	35.10%	12,327	93	41.62%
2021	N11 Batu Lintang	See Chee How (PSB)	4,420	35.86%	Cherishe Ng Phuay Hui (PKR)	1,823	14.79%	12,327	93	41.62%
2021	N11 Batu Lintang	See Chee How (PSB)	4,420	35.86%	Voon Lee Shan (PBK)	1,570	12.74%	12,327	93	41.62%
2021	N11 Batu Lintang	See Chee How (PSB)	4,420	35.86%	Leong Shaow Tung (ASPIRASI)	187	1.52%	12,327	93	41.62%

== See also ==
- Batu Lintang (state constituency)
