= Sarawak Metro =

Sarawak Metro Sdn Bhd

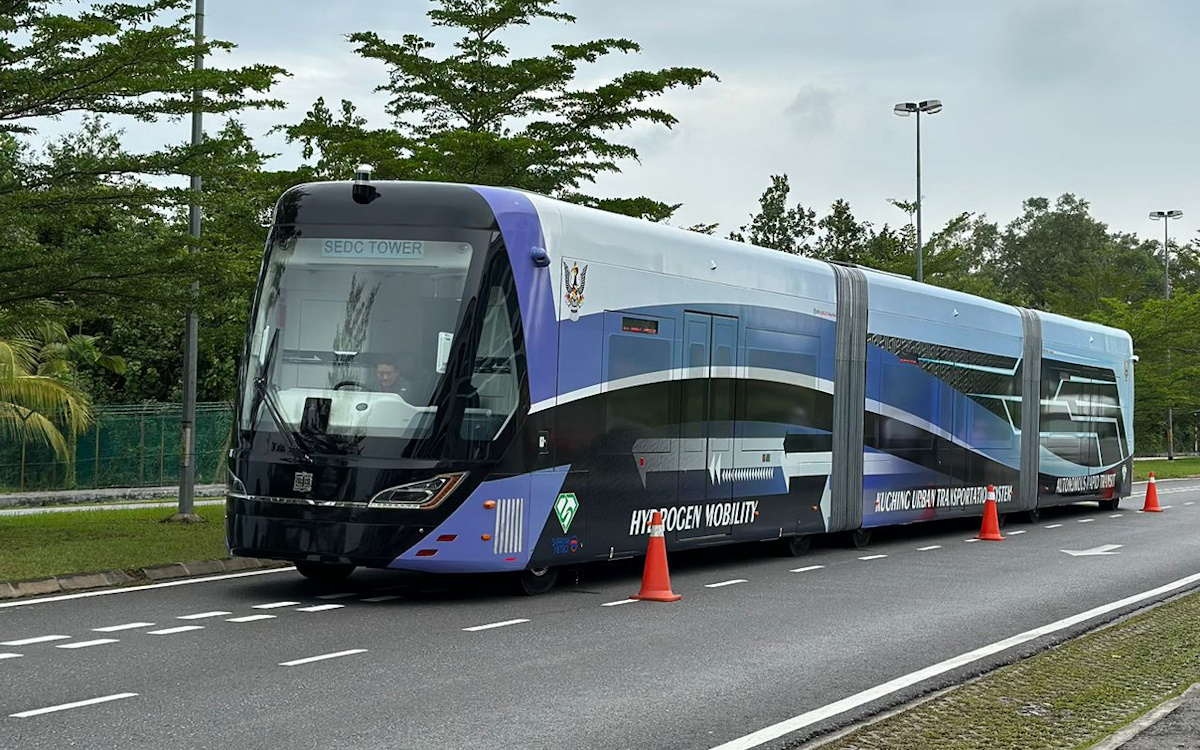
- A prototype Kuching ART vehicle with temporary livery
- Type: State-owned enterprise
- Industry: Public transportation operator & asset owner for Sarawakian-based metro systems
- Founded: February 2018; 8 years ago
- Headquarters: Unit 16-01A, Level 16, Gateway Kuching, 9, Jalan Bukit Mata Kuching, 93100 Kuching, Sarawak, Malaysia
- Key people: Abdul Aziz bin Dato Haji Husain (Chairman); Vacant (CEO); Haji Zafrin bin Zakariah (Project Director, KUTS); Ts. Haji Suhardi bin Mohamad Ali Yakop (Project Director, BSTS)
- Products: Kuching Urban Transportation System
- Services: Asset owner and operator of public transport: • Autonomous rapid transit (ART) • Stage bus
- Website: www.mysarawakmetro.com

Sarawak Metro Sdn Bhd is a Malaysian state-owned company and a corporate body established and fully owned by the Sarawak Economic Development Corporation (SEDC) as a move to set up and develop the state's public transportation assets.

It is currently in charge of the Kuching Urban Transportation System (KUTS) project in Kuching, the capital of the state of Sarawak, which is currently undergoing construction as well as trial operations of its hydrogen buses which have been introduced in limited capacity since January 2020, under the state government's move to ease worsening traffic congestion in the state.

The company was established in February 2018 in order to undertake the KUTS project proposed by the Government of Sarawak and eventually became operational in September 2019.

Sarawak Metro is responsible in the monitoring and operations of its assets as well as quality control and land management of public transportation projects. It is also responsible for awarding contracts to companies involved in the construction of their assets of which they are also involved in.

== Rationale ==
- Kuching Urban Transportation System (KUTS) (under construction)
- Sarawak Metro Hydrogen Bus trials (ongoing since January 2020; Heritage Loop & Damai Loop)
- Bintulu-Samalaju Transit System (BSTS) (TBA)

== Station naming rights programme ==
In August 2026, Sarawak Metro introduced their very own station naming rights programme which also encompasses transit-oriented developments (TODs), advertising within stations and tourism initiatives to support the KUTS network's long-term sustainability. This allows corporate brands to bid for the right to showcase their identity through naming, branding, and signing privileges throughout selected ART stations.

Prior to operations, the very first station on the KUTS network to be named under the programme was The Northbank IBRACO ART station on 1 August 2026 which will be fully integrated into the surrounding developments of the upcoming Northbank Business Exchange (NBX) as well as the Regency Specialist Hospital Kuching.

=== Active station naming agreements ===
Line	Station name and code
SM Blue Line	SM07 The Northbank IBRACO
