= Swinburne University of Technology Sarawak Campus =

University in Kuching, Malaysia

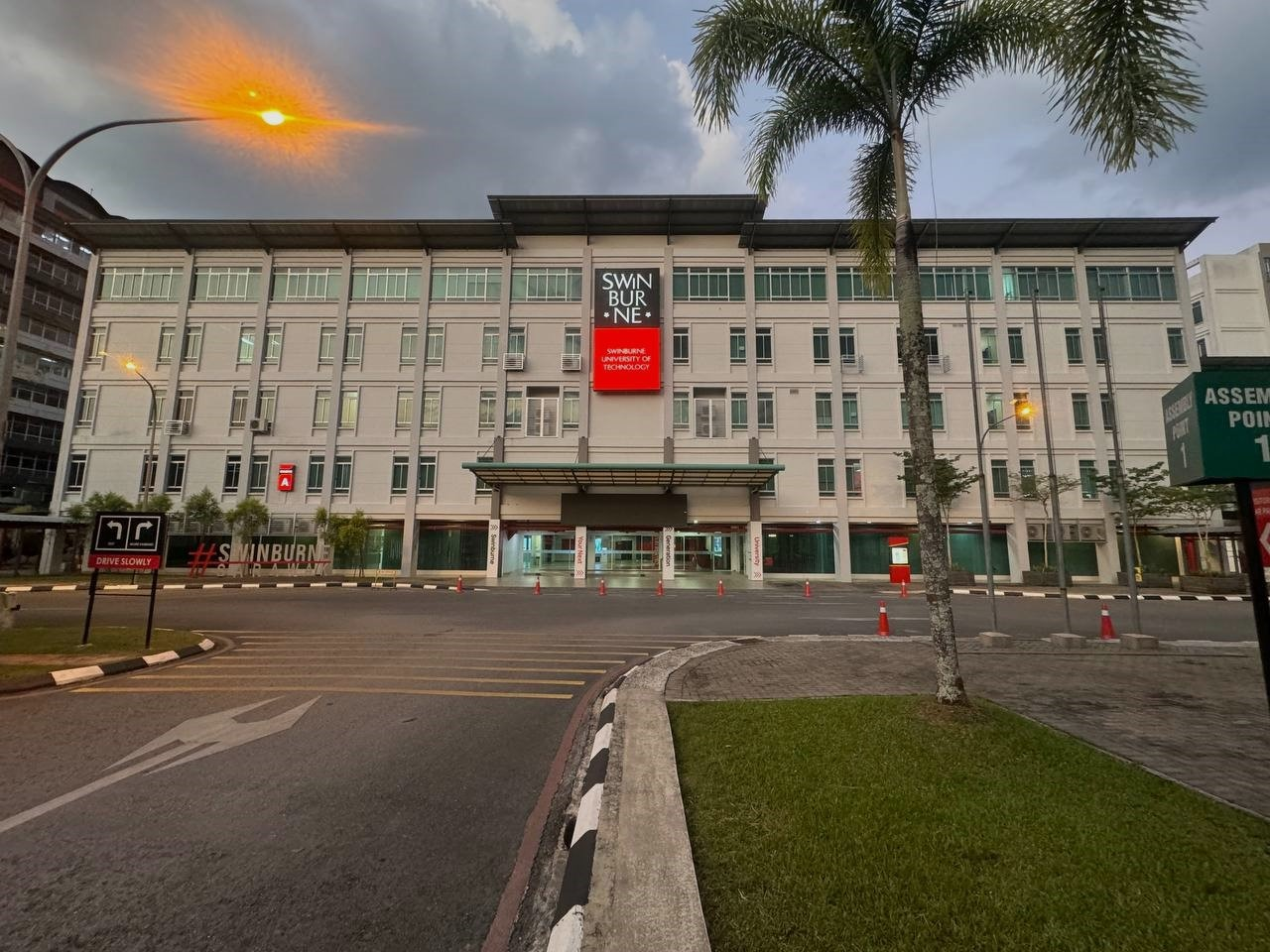
- Type: Private
- Established: 2000
- Chancellor: Professor John Pollaers OAM
- Vice-Chancellor: Professor Pascale Quester
- Pro-Chancellor: The Right Honourable Datuk Patinggi (Dr) Abang Haji Abdul Rahman Zohari Bin Tun Datuk Abang Haji Openg
- Students: 4,000 (2015)
- Location: Kuching, Sarawak, Malaysia; 1°31′55″N 110°21′25″E
- Campus: Urban
- Website: swinburne.edu.my

Swinburne University of Technology Sarawak Campus (SUTS) is the foreign branch campus of Swinburne University and is located in Kuching, Sarawak, Malaysia. Established in 2000, Swinburne Sarawak operates as a partnership between the Sarawak State Government and Swinburne Australia. The initiative behind the Sarawak campus is part of a long-term strategy by Swinburne Australia to "globalise its operations and provide its students with international living, working and learning opportunities".

The Swinburne Sarawak campus operates as a full-fledged branch campus, joining three other Swinburne campuses in Melbourne, Australia, and is under the academic control of Swinburne's Higher Education Division in Australia. Courses offered are identical to those available in Melbourne and graduates are awarded Australian testamurs.

== History ==
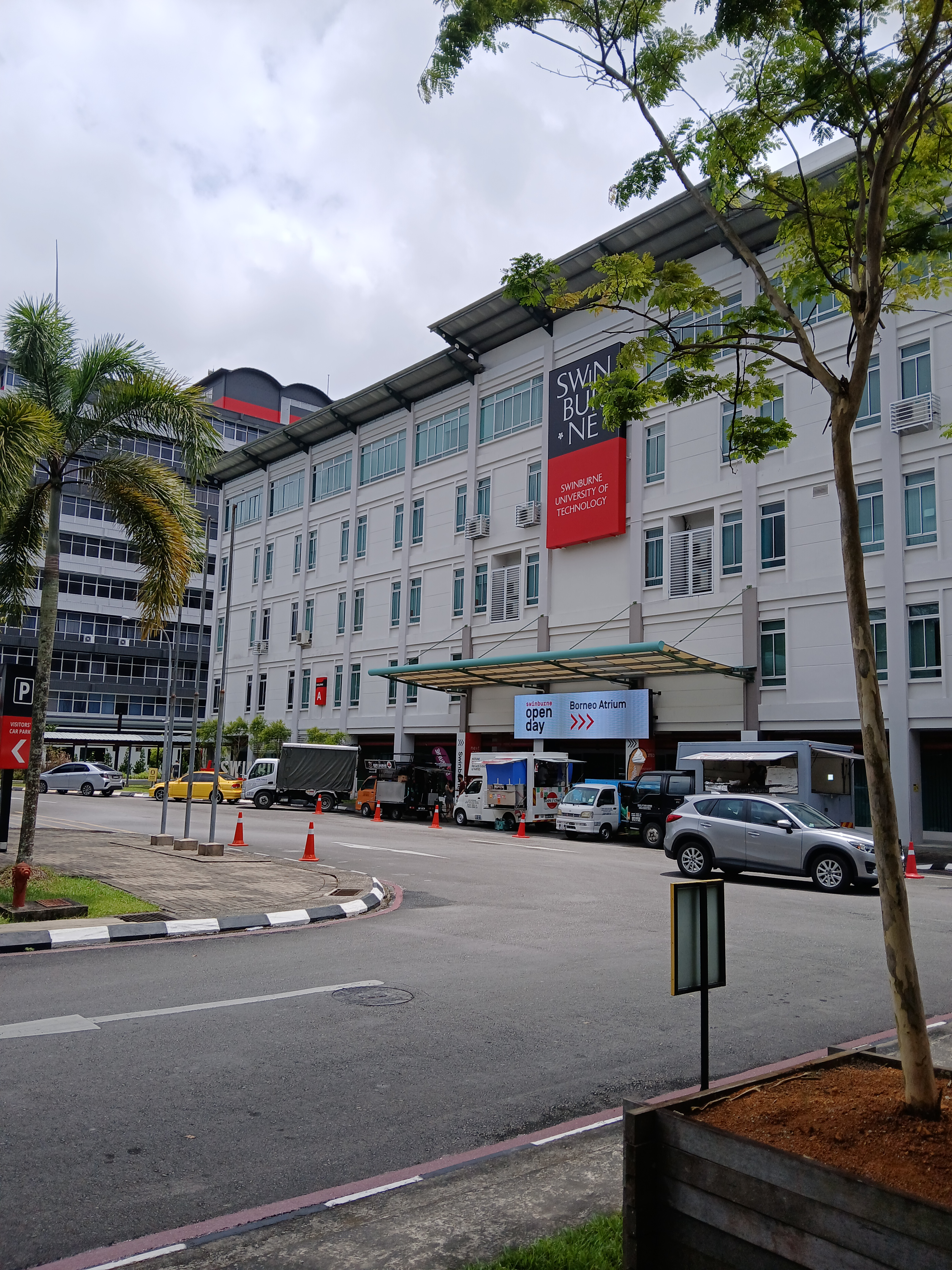
Building A of SUTS.

As a result of close ties between Sarawak and Australia, the Swinburne University of Technology of Melbourne, Australia was identified by the State Government as a viable partner in assisting the state's educational needs. Following the long-term strategy by Swinburne Australia, and the approval of the then Minister of Education of Malaysia, Najib Tun Razak in 1999, the Swinburne Sarawak Institute of Technology was set up within a State Office Complex building at Jalan Simpang Tiga, Kuching, Sarawak.

Operating as a partnership between the Sarawak Foundation and the Sarawak Higher Education Foundation, the campus welcomed the first batch of 130 students in August 2000.

Swinburne Sarawak Institute of Technology was officially granted status as a university branch campus on 10 June 2004, effectively becoming Swinburne's sixth and latest campus, joining five other campuses in Melbourne, Australia. The university was since then known as Swinburne University of Technology, Sarawak Campus and was, at the time, the fifth branch campus university in the country. Student population was at 700.

Work on a campus expansion started in late 2005. The project was wholly funded by the Sarawak Government. Construction on the extended campus was completed in August 2008. Eight new custom designed buildings were added to the campus, increasing the total number of buildings to 12.

RM50 million has been invested into further transforming the Sarawak campus throughout the course of 2019–22.

== Location ==
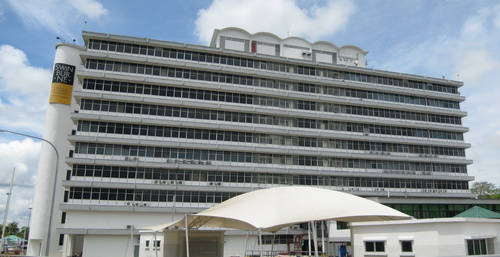
Building G, which was formerly a state office complex

Swinburne Sarawak is located on a 6.5 ha (16.5 acre) campus in Jalan Simpang Tiga, Kuching.

The campus is located about 10 minutes away from the city centre and is surrounded by commercial and residential areas.

Once completed, it will be connected to the Kuching Urban Transportation System (KUTS) via its namesake station, SR09 Swinburne which will allow students to easily traverse to other parts of Kuching.

== Administration ==
The university operates as a Branch Campus of Swinburne University of Technology, in Melbourne, Australia. It is 75% owned by the Sarawak Government and 25% owned by Swinburne, Australia.

Swinburne Sarawak's day-to-day affairs is administered by Pro Vice-Chancellor and Chief Executive Officer Ir. Professor Lau Hieng Ho.

The current Chief Minister of Sarawak The Right Honourable Datuk Patinggi (Dr) Abang Haji Abdul Rahman Zohari Bin Tun Datuk Abang Haji Openg was installed as its third Pro Chancellor in October 2017.

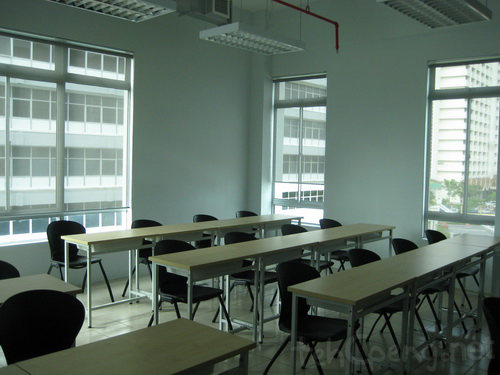
Tutorial rooms
