= Chong Ted Tsiung =

Malaysian politician

- 张德松

3rd Kuching South Mayor
- In office 25 September 2006 – 3 August 2007
- Deputy: Mohd Amin Hassan
- Preceded by: Chan Seng Khai
- Succeeded by: James Chan Khay Syn

Personal details
- Born: 18 June 1956 Kuching, Kingdom of Sarawak
- Died: 3 August 2007 (age 51) Kuching, Sarawak, Malaysia
- Party: Independent
- Spouse: Mary Frances Chua
- Children: Michelle Chong; Crystal Chong; Charmaine Chong

Chong Ted Tsiung (simplified Chinese: 张德松; traditional Chinese: 張德松; pinyin: Zhāng Désōng; Jyutping: Zoeng1 Dak1 Cung4; Pe̍h-ōe-jī: Tiunn Tik-tshîng; Pha̍k-fa-sṳ: Chông Tet-tshiùng) was the third mayor of Kuching City South Council. He succeeded Chan Seng Khai who was the second mayor of Kuching City South Council on 31 July 2006. He was the first non-politician to be appointed as a mayor of Kuching City South Council, having previously been employed by the state as Controller of Environment Quality.

== Early life ==
Born in a family of 9 in Kuching on 18 June 1956, he received his 6-year primary education at 10th Mile Chinese Primary School and his secondary education at Dragon Government Secondary' School, 24th Mile Kuching-Serian Road. In 1982, he graduated with a bachelor's degree (Honours) in Public Administration from De Montfort University, Leicester, England, Later, in 1995 he obtained his Master of Science in Environmental Policy and Management from Hull University, UK.
