= Kuching Sentral =

Kuching Sentral Bus Terminal
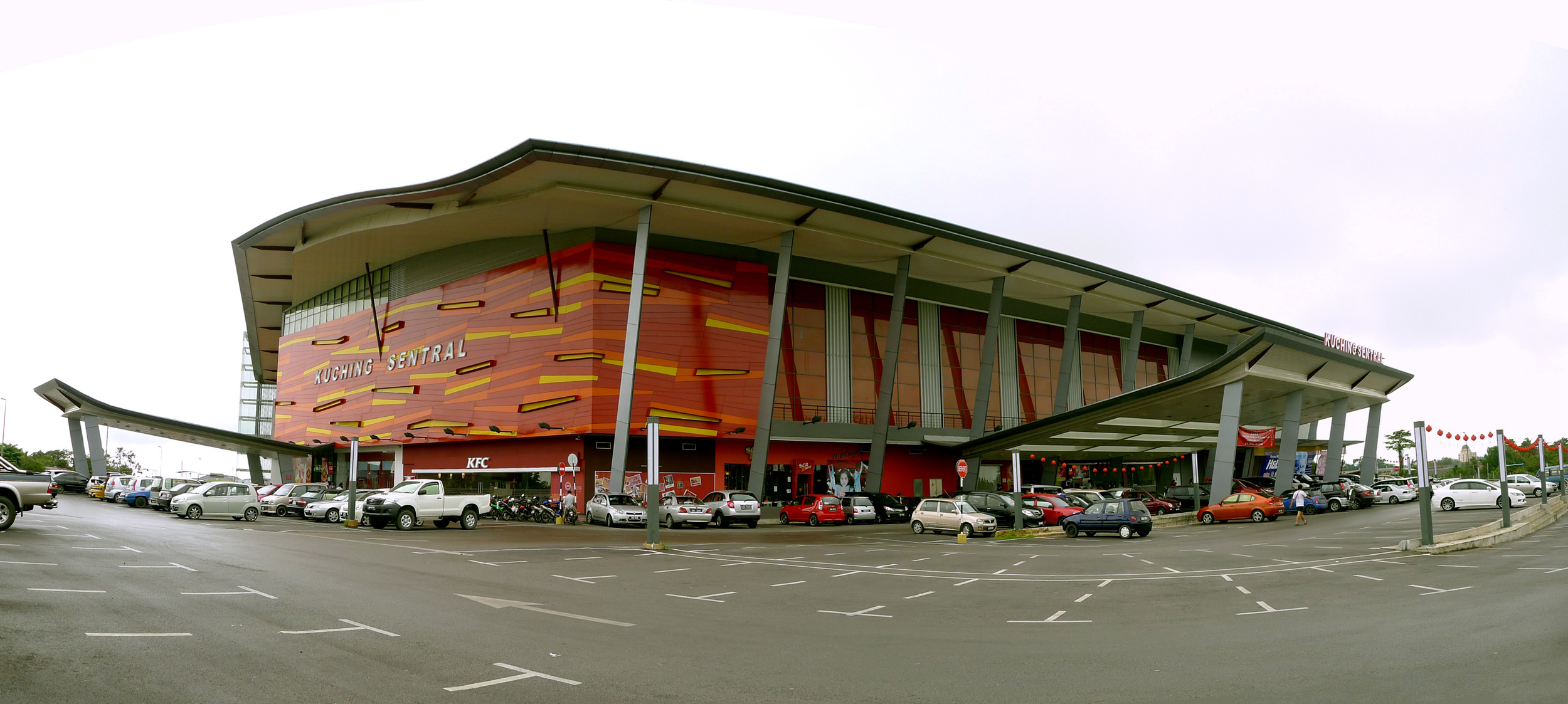
- Front view of Kuching Sentral

General information
- Location: Lot 1960, Block 226, KNLD 4 1/2 Mile, Jalan Kong Ping, Off Jalan Penrissen, 93250 Kuching, Sarawak
- Coordinates: 1°28′54″N 110°19′56″E
- Owner: Kuching Sentral Sdn Bhd
- Operator: Bus Asia (Biaramas Express), MTC Express, EVA Express, Sungei Merah, Kapit Express, DAMRI
- Connections: SR05 Kuching Sentral (to be completed)

History
- Opened: March 2012; 14 years ago
Location

Kuching Sentral Bus Terminal is a regional bus terminal located in Kuching, the capital of Sarawak, Malaysia. It is a central bus hub for express buses from Kuching serving cities of Sarawak, as well as the neighbouring region of West Kalimantan, Indonesia.

== History ==
Kuching Sentral was built by Permodalan Assar Sdn. Bhd. (PASB), a Sarawak state-owned firm with a budget of RM100 million. It was officially incorporated on 6th November 2003 but construction did not start until around 2009. The terminal was projected to open in December of 2010, however after some delays, it eventually opened on March of 2012.

When the terminal opened, all express bus services to Kuching began their services here and terminated their routes from the old bus terminal which was located near 3rd Mile, at Hua Joo Park which has since been turned into a commercial centre. The cargo services for Bus Asia however still remain in the area.

== Facilities ==
Kuching Sentral is built with passenger comfort in mind, with air-conditioned waiting bays, bus bays and ticketing counters (operated by each of bus operators, as the terminal does not provide centralized ticketing), as well as dedicated parking areas and commercial van bays.

It is also built to be an integrated complex with retail stores, a hypermarket (H&L Supercenter) and a food court, giving it a "mall in a terminal" experience to users.

== Services ==
Kuching Sentral provides express bus services to other major towns and cities of Sarawak, mainly to Sibu, Bintulu, Kapit, Mukah and Miri, including stops in Serian, Simanggang/Sri Aman and Sarikei. Major operators including Bus Asia/Biaramas, Sungei Merah and EVA Express.

The terminal also serves Kuching cross-border routes to and from cities of Pontianak and Singkawang in West Kalimantan province, Indonesia, mainly operated by major Sarawak operators as well as Indonesian operator of DAMRI.

== Connections ==
The terminal has a local bus stop for the Kuching Metro free bus (Route 103) starting from the city centre to Semenggoh Wildlife Centre, which also provide stops to and from Kuching International Airport as well. From 1 April 2026, the new Q15 route of BAS.MY Kuching started with the terminal as the terminus, to city centre via the airport, Padungan and Stampin.

In the future, the terminal will be connected to the Red Line of Kuching Urban Transportation System via the SR05 Kuching Sentral ART station which serves as its namesake as well as being the southern terminus for the Phase 1 to SR12 DM01 Pending ART station.
