= Kuching South City Council =

Malaysian municipal government

Council of the City of Kuching South
- Majlis Bandaraya Kuching Selatan

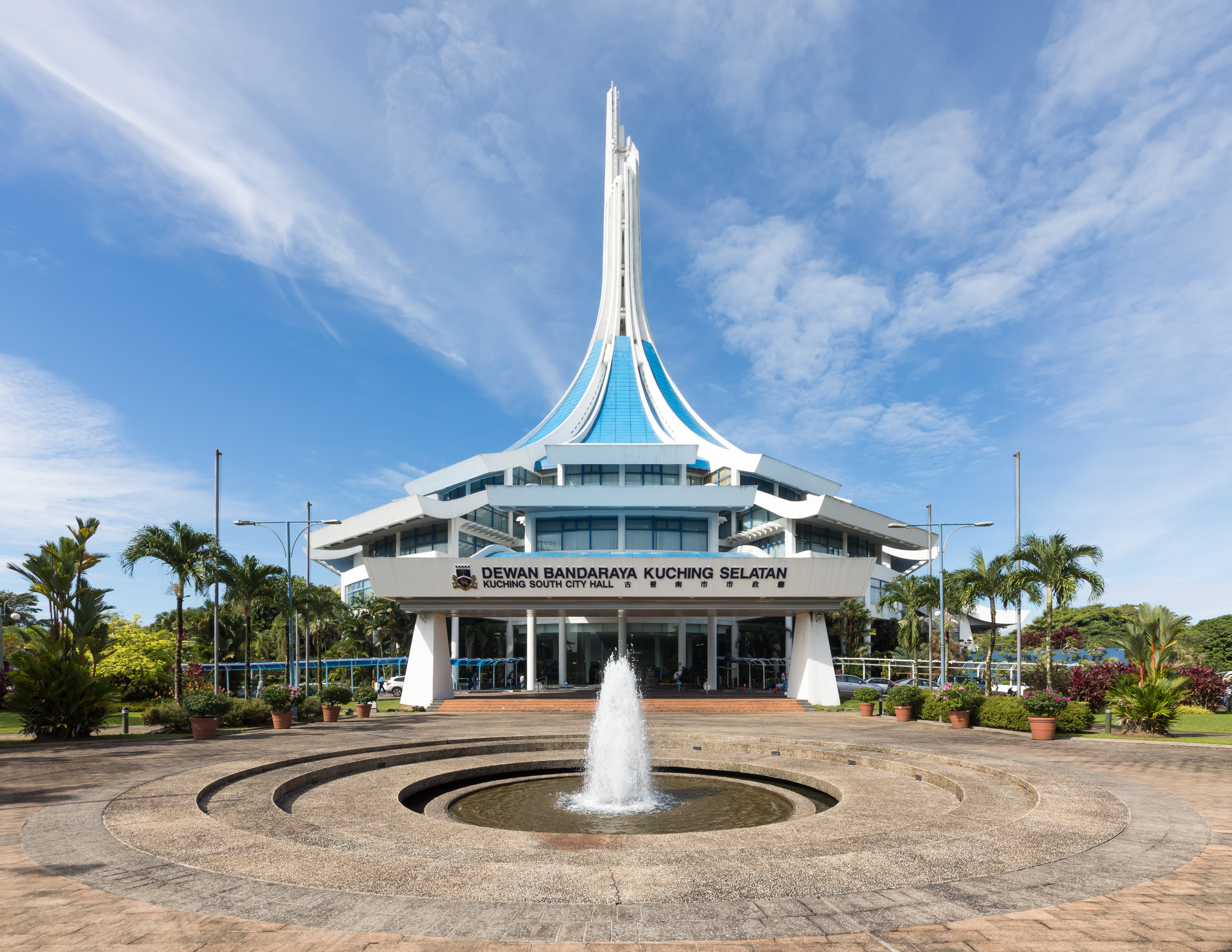

Agency overview
- Formed: 1 August 1988; 37 years ago
- Preceding agency: Kuching Municipal Council
- Jurisdiction: Southern part of the City of Kuching
- Headquarters: Jalan Padungan, 93675 Kuching, Sarawak, Malaysia
- Motto: Berkhidmat Untuk Masyarakat; Service For the Society
- Agency executives: Dato Wee Hong Seng, Mayor; Dato Zaiedi Suhaili, Deputy Mayor; Ita Ling, City Council Secretary
- Website: mbks.sarawak.gov.my

The Council of the City of Kuching South (Malay: Majlis Bandaraya Kuching Selatan, abbreviated MBKS) is the city council which administers the southern part of the city of Kuching in the state of Sarawak, Malaysia. This council was established after the city was officially granted city status on 1 August 1988. Their jurisdiction covers an area of 61.53 square kilometres.

The council consists of the mayor plus thirty councillors appointed to serve a one-year term by the Sarawak State Government. DBKU is responsible for public health and sanitation, waste removal and management, town planning, environmental protection and building control, social and economic development and general maintenance functions of urban infrastructure which was formerly administered by Majlis Perbandaran Kuching (MPK) or the Kuching Municipal Board.

== History ==
Before 1922, the Kuching township was managed by the Public Works Department. In 1922, Kuching Sanitary and Municipal Advisory Board was formed which consisted of five Europeans, four Chinese, one Malay and one Indian.

In 1952, the Kuching Municipal Ordinance was enacted, which led to the formation of the Kuching Municipal Council in January 1953, with a maximum of 27 and a minimum of six members.

The first Kuching Municipal Council election took place on 4 November 1956, electing 27 councillors. A total of 58 people offered themselves as candidates for the 9 wards and 27 seats on the new Council. The newly elected Council took office on 1 December 1956. The President and Vice President were elected from among the Councillors and held office for a period of one year, with eligibility for re-election.

The 3-year term of office of the 1963 elected Councillors should have expired on 30 June 1966. However, due to certain political development in the State, the tenure of office was extended by the State Government and the Councillors who were elected at the 3rd local council elections in 1963 continued to hold office until 14 October 1981 when the council was restructured. The enactment of the Kuching Municipal (Amendment) (No.2) Ordinances 1977 made 15 December 1977 among other things, led the elective system by an appointment system of Councillors. It was provided that the council should consist of the chairman, the deputy chairman; and not less than eight and not more than twenty-four Councillors to be appointed by the Governor to serve a term not extending three years. This amendment Ordinance was only brought into force with effect from 15 October 1981 on which date a new set of Councillors were appointed and all the Councillors elected in 1963 ceased to hold office on 14 October 1981.

On 1 August 1988, the Municipality was elevated to city status, making it the fourth city in Malaysia after George Town, Kuala Lumpur and Ipoh. This historic date also saw the administrative division of the City into Kuching North (covering a significant part of the central areas of downtown Kuching, previously administered by the Kuching Municipal Council and including new areas across the Sarawak River, previously administered by the Kuching Rural District Council) and Kuching South (covering part of the areas previously administered by the Kuching Municipal Council to the east of downtown Kuching and come new areas to the south of the former Municipality, previously administered by the Kuching Rural District Council) comprising an area of 61.53 km^{2}.

The Council of the City of Kuching South is a corporation established under the Local Authorities Ordinance, 1996. Like all other local authorities, it is essentially an authority providing public services within its area of jurisdiction comprising an area of 61.53 km^{2}.

The council now consists of a Mayor, a Deputy Mayor and 30 Councillors, all of whom are appointed by the State Government of Sarawak. The State Government appoints the Councillors on a 2-year term, renewable at its discretion. The Councillors represent the various political component parties of the coalition government of Sarawak. The Councillors are responsible for formulating the Councils policies and for ensuring that the Administrator implements these policies in an efficient and effective manner.

The mode by which the council conducts its business is through the committee system. The Standing Committees normally meet once a month to deal with matters under their respective terms of reference. The Committees make decisions in the form of recommendations to the Full Council for its adoption at its ordinary meeting, which is usually held at the end of the month. The City Secretary is the Chief Administrative Officer of the City Council. Its various divisions, namely the Administration, the Treasury, the Building & Landscaping, the Engineering, the Rating and Valuation, the Public Health, and the Licensing undertake the functions of the Organisation. Each head of division controls expenditure as approved in the annual estimates of the council. The mode by which the council conducts its business is through the committee system. The Standing Committees normally meet once a month to deal with matters under their respective terms of reference. The Committees make decisions in the form of recommendations to the Full Council for its adoption at its ordinary meeting, which is usually held at the end of the month.

=== Appointed mayors of Kuching South ===
No.	Mayor	Term start	Term end
1.	Song Swee Guan	1 August 1988	31 December 1996
2.	Chan Seng Khai	1 January 1997	31 July 2005
3.	Chong Ted Tsiung	25 September 2005	3 August 2007
4.	James Chan Khay Syn	4 June 2008	31 August 2019
5.	Wee Hong Seng	1 September 2019	Incumbent

== List of Councillors ==
SUPP (15) PBB (8) PDP (3) PRS (3) SDNU (1)

=== Zone 1 ===
=== Zone 1 ===		Area		Postcode
=== Zone 1 ===		Green Heights		93250
=== Zone 1 ===		Hui Sing Garden	輝盛花園	93350
=== Zone 1 ===		Kuching International Airport	古晉國際機場	93250
=== Zone 1 ===		Seng Goon Garden	承恩花園	93250
=== Zone 1 ===		Stampin	實淡賓路	93350
Party	Councillor	Post		
SUPP	Philip Liaw Kian Sin	Chairperson		
SUPP	Iu Cho Heng	Deputy Chairperson		
PRS	Cr Dato Azizi Morni	Member		
PRS	Timothy Julius	Member		

=== Zone 2 ===
=== Zone 2 ===		Area		Postcode
=== Zone 2 ===		Borneo Development Corporation (BDC) Garden	BDC花園	93350
=== Zone 2 ===		Stutong	斯楮東	93350
=== Zone 2 ===		Tabuan Heights	達閩高地	93350
Party	Councillor	Post		
SUPP	Lee Jun Choi	Chairperson		
SDNU	Wilfred Mujah Aton	Deputy Chairperson		
SUPP	Shankar Ram Pohumall Asnani	Member		
PBB	Dzamaluddin Zainudin	Member		

=== Zone 3 ===
=== Zone 3 ===		Area		Postcode
=== Zone 3 ===		Batu Lintang	峇都令當	93200
=== Zone 3 ===		Bormill Estate	婆美房地產	93150
=== Zone 3 ===		Kenny Hill	肯尼山莊	93350
=== Zone 3 ===		Laman Bong Chin	黃請園	93200
=== Zone 3 ===		Marbel Garden		93350
=== Zone 3 ===		Ong Tiang Swee Road	王長水路	93200
=== Zone 3 ===		Upper Laksamana Cheng Ho Road	鄭和統帥路	93350
Party	Councillor	Post		
SUPP	Mok Chuang Ping	Chairperson		
SUPP	Lim Swee Chiaw	Deputy Chairperson		
SUPP	Katharine Voon Yian Wie	Member		
PBB	Drahman Jaladin	Member		

=== Zone 4 ===
=== Zone 4 ===		Area		Postcode
=== Zone 4 ===		Sama Jaya Free Industrial Zone	莎玛再也自由工业区	93350
=== Zone 4 ===		Setia Raja Road	斯帝亞拉者路	93350
=== Zone 4 ===		Tabuan Desa	達閩德沙	93350
=== Zone 4 ===		Tabuan Dusun	科丹地路	93350
=== Zone 4 ===		Tabuan Laru	達閩拉魯	93350
=== Zone 4 ===		Tabuan Melayu Village	達閩馬來村	93450
=== Zone 4 ===		Tabuan Park	達閩園	93450
Party	Councillor	Post		
PBB	Iskandar Sharkawi	Chairperson		
PBB	Sebali Chik	Deputy Chairperson		
PDP	Yong Li Na	Member		
PRS	Rosaline Neging	Member		
PBB	Mohamad Ali Han	Member		

=== Zone 5 ===
=== Zone 5 ===		Area		Postcode
=== Zone 5 ===		Foochow Road	福州路	93300
=== Zone 5 ===		Padungan	浮羅岸	93100
=== Zone 5 ===		Petanak Road	畢打那路	93100
=== Zone 5 ===		Song Thian Cheok Road	宋天祝路	93100
Party	Councillor	Post		
SUPP	Lau Sie Tung	Chairperson		
PBB	Sufian Ateng	Deputy Chairperson		
SUPP	Bong Lian Huan	Member		
SUPP	Jong Yean Pin	Member		

=== Zone 6 ===
=== Zone 6 ===		Area		Postcode
=== Zone 6 ===		Bintawa Road	民達華路	93450
=== Zone 6 ===		Kilang Road	工廠路	93450
=== Zone 6 ===		Peace Road	和平路	93450
=== Zone 6 ===		Pelabuhan Road	碼头路	93450
=== Zone 6 ===		Pending	朋嶺	93450
=== Zone 6 ===		Semangat Road		93450
=== Zone 6 ===		Riverview Garden	河景園	93050
=== Zone 6 ===		Sungai Apong	雙溪亞邦	93450
Party	Councillor	Post		
SUPP	Kho Teck Wan	Chairperson		
SUPP	Ong Chee Chiang	Deputy Chairperson		
PBB	Abdul Baderi Sahnmat	Member		
SUPP	Chai Ju Loon	Member		

=== Zone 7 ===		Area		Postcode
=== Zone 7 ===		Chawan Road	詔安路	93300
=== Zone 7 ===		Foochow No. 1 Road	福州第一路	93300
=== Zone 7 ===		Kenyalang Park	肯雅蘭園	93300
=== Zone 7 ===		Supreme Garden		93300
=== Zone 7 ===		Uplands Road	高原路	93350
Party	Councillor	Post		
SUPP	Goh Tze Hui	Chairperson		
SUPP	Patrick Gordon Song	Deputy Chairperson		
PDP	Lamanu Talit	Member		
PBB	Mulok Saban	Member		
PDP	Theresa Dunstan Udam	Member		

== See also ==
- Kuching North City Hall (DBKU)
- Padawan Municipal Council (MPP)
