= James Chan Khay Syn =

Malaysian politician (born 1950)

Yang Berbahagia Dato James Chan Khay Syn PSBS
- 曾长青

4th Mayor of City of Kuching South
- In office 4 June 2008 – 31 August 2019
- Deputy: Abang Affandi Abang Anuar (2008-2016); Hilmy Othman (2016-2019)
- Preceded by: Chong Ted Tsiung
- Succeeded by: Wee Hong Seng

Personal details
- Born: 1 June 1950 (age 76) Kuching, Crown Colony of Sarawak (now Sarawak, Malaysia)
- Party: Independent (IND)
- Spouse: Catherine S'ng

Dato James Chan Khay Syn (simplified Chinese: 曾长青; traditional Chinese: 曾長青; pinyin: Zēng Chángqīng; Jyutping: Zang1 Coeng4 Cing1; Pe̍h-ōe-jī: Chan Tióng-chheng; born 1 June 1950) was the fourth Mayor of Council of the City of Kuching South.

== Career ==
Chan previously worked as General Manager of Harwood Timber Sdn Bhd, a subsidiary of the Sarawak Timber Industry Development Corporation (STIDC).

Chan succeeded Chong Ted Tsiung, the third mayor of Kuching South City, who died on 3 August 2007. Chan was sworn in as mayor on 4 June 2008, before he could fully recover from his knee surgery. Mayor Chan is known to be a "hands on" Mayor as he constantly visit sites and markets such as Stutong Market to understand the situation and problems faced by people.

In late 2018, it was announced that Chan's term, due to expire on 31 December 2018, was extended until 31 August 2019.

== Honours ==
- Sarawak
  - Commander of the Order of the Star of Sarawak (PSBS) - Dato (2012)
