= Batu Lintang (state constituency) =

State constituency in Sarawak, Malaysia

Batu Lintang (N11)
Sarawak constituency

State constituency
- Legislature: Sarawak State Legislative Assembly
MLA
Vacant
- Constituency created: 1987
- First contested: 1991
- Last contested: 2026

Batu Lintang is a state constituency in Sarawak, Malaysia, that has been represented in the Sarawak State Legislative Assembly since 1991.

The state constituency was created in the 1987 redistribution and is mandated to return a single member to the Sarawak State Legislative Assembly under the first past the post voting system.

== Demographics ==
Ethnic breakdown of Batu Lintang's electorate as of 2022
1. Chinese (81.3%)
2. Sarawak bumiputera (12.5%)
3. Malay-Muslim bumiputera (4.20%)
4. Other ethnicities (2.00%)

== History ==
As of 2020, Batu Lintang has a population of 65,044 people.

=== Polling districts ===
According to the gazette issued on 31 October 2022, the Batu Lintang constituency has a total of 11 polling districts.

State constituency	Polling Districts	Code	Location
Batu Lintang (N11)	Pisang	195/11/01	SJK (C) St. Paul
Batu Lintang (N11)	Batu Lintang	195/11/02	SMK Batu Lintang; SK Jln Ong Tiang Swee; St. John Ambulance Headquarters Building Lorong Cheng Ho No.8
Batu Lintang (N11)	Star Garden	195/11/03	SMK Green Road
Batu Lintang (N11)	Poh Kwong Park	195/11/04	SK Combined (Blok A)
Batu Lintang (N11)	Sky Green	195/11/05	SK Green Road
Batu Lintang (N11)	Bukit Kenny	195/11/06	Blik Perbincangan, Islamic Information Centre
Batu Lintang (N11)	Tabuan Dayak	195/11/07	Lobi Blessed Church, Jln Seladah Off Jalan Tun Jugah
Batu Lintang (N11)	Tabuan Jaya	195/11/08	Lodge International School; SMK Lodge
Batu Lintang (N11)	Tabuan Laru	195/11/09	SMK Tabuan Jaya
Batu Lintang (N11)	Maong	195/11/10	SK Sg. Maong Hilir
Batu Lintang (N11)	Nanas-Pisang	195/11/11	SK Combined (Block B)

=== Representation history ===
Members of the Legislative Assembly for Batu Lintang
Assembly	No	Years	Member	Party
Constituency created from Stampin, Padungan and Satok
13th	N09	1991-1996	Chan Seng Khai (田承凯)	BN (SUPP)
14th	N10	1996-2001	Chan Seng Khai (田承凯)	BN (SUPP)
15th	N10	2001-2006	Chan Seng Khai (田承凯)	BN (SUPP)
16th	N11	2006-2011	Voon Lee Shan (溫利山)	PR (DAP)
17th	N11	2011-2016	See Chee How （施志豪）	PR (PKR)
18th	N11	2016–2020	See Chee How （施志豪）	PH (PKR)
18th	N11	2020	See Chee How （施志豪）	Independent
18th	N11	2020-2021	See Chee How （施志豪）	PSB
19th	N11	2021-2022	See Chee How （施志豪）	PSB
19th	N11	2022–2026	See Chee How （施志豪）	Independent

== Election results ==
Sarawak state election, 2026
Party	Candidate	Votes	%	∆%
GPS				▲
DAP	Kelvin Yii Lee Wuen			▲
PBK	Voon Lee Shan			▲
Total valid votes				
Total rejected ballots				
Unreturned ballots				
Turnout				
Registered electors				
Majority				

Sarawak state election, 2021
Party	Candidate	Votes	%	∆%
PSB	See Chee How	4,420	35.86	▲35.86
GPS	Sih Hua Tong	4,327	35.10	▲35.10
PKR	Cherishe Ng	1,823	14.79	▼46.82
PBK	Voon Lee Shan	1,570	12.74	▲12.74
ASPIRASI	Leong Shaow Tung	187	1.52	▲1.52
Total valid votes		12,327	100.00	
Total rejected ballots		94		
Unreturned ballots		75		
Turnout		12,496	42.08	▼20.59
Registered electors		29,694		
Majority		93	0.75	▼24.36
PSB gain from PKR		Swing		?
Source(s) https://lom.agc.gov.my/ilims/upload/portal/akta/outputp/1718688/PUB687.pdf

Sarawak state election, 2016
Party	Candidate	Votes	%	∆%
PKR	See Chee How	10,758	61.61	▼10.40
BN	Sih Hua Tong	6,373	36.50	▲10.09
STAR	Soo Lina	331	1.89	▲1.89
Total valid votes		17,462	100.00	
Total rejected ballots		110		
Unreturned ballots		41		
Turnout		17,613	62.67	▼3.71
Registered electors		28,105		
Majority		4,385	25.11	▼20.50
PKR hold		Swing		
Source(s) "Federal Government Gazette - Notice of Contested Election, State Legislative Assembly of the State of Sarawak [P.U. (B) 190/2016]" (PDF). Attorney General's Chambers of Malaysia. 25 April 2016. Archived from the original (PDF) on 12 June 2017. "Senarai Calon yang Disahkan Layak Bertanding Pilihan Raya Dewan Undangan Negeri ke-11". Election Commission of Malaysia. 25 April 2016. Archived from the original on 25 April 2016.

Sarawak state election, 2011
Party	Candidate	Votes	%	∆%
PKR	See Chee How	13,235	72.01	▲72.01
BN	Sih Hua Tong	4,854	26.41	▼11.60
Independent	Soo Lina	290	1.58	▲1.58
Total valid votes		18,379	100.00	
Total rejected ballots		61		
Unreturned ballots		35		
Turnout		18,475	66.38	▲8.50
Registered electors		27,833		
Majority		8,381	45.60	▲21.61
PKR gain from DAP		Swing		?
Source(s) "Federal Government Gazette - Results of Contested Election and Statements of the Poll after the Official Addition of Votes Sarawak [P.U. (B) 245/2011]" (PDF). Attorney General's Chambers of Malaysia. 29 April 2011.

Sarawak state election, 2006
Party	Candidate	Votes	%	∆%
DAP	Voon Lee Shan	8,806	61.99	▲61.99
BN	Chan Seng Khai	5,399	38.01	▼31.94
Total valid votes		14,205	100.00	
Total rejected ballots		76		
Unreturned ballots		64		
Turnout		14,345	57.88	▼1.42
Registered electors		24,783		
Majority		3,407	23.99	▼20.47
DAP gain from BN		Swing		?

Sarawak state election, 2001
Party	Candidate	Votes	%	∆%
BN	Chan Seng Khai	11,625	69.95	▼0.79
PKR	Cheng Hui Hong	4,237	25.50	▲25.50
Independent	Francis Siah Khui Siang	756	4.55	▼13.66
Total valid votes		16,618	100.00	
Total rejected ballots		122		
Unreturned ballots		39		
Turnout		16,779	59.30	▲3.20
Registered electors		28,293		
Majority		7,388	44.46	▼8.07
BN hold		Swing		

Sarawak state election, 1996
Party	Candidate	Votes	%	∆%
BN	Chan Seng Khai	9,400	70.74	▲12.03
Independent	Francis Siah Khui Siang	2,420	18.21	▲18.21
Independent	Chua Chio Kuia	1,469	11.05	▲11.05
Total valid votes		13,289	100.00	
Total rejected ballots		110		
Unreturned ballots		186		
Turnout		13,585	56.10	▼10.50
Registered electors		24,215		
Majority		6,980	52.53	▲35.12
BN hold		Swing		

Sarawak state election, 1991
Party	Candidate	Votes	%
BN	Chan Seng Khai	8,206	58.71
DAP	Sim Kwang Yang	5,772	41.29
Total valid votes		13,978	100.00
Total rejected ballots		94	
Unreturned ballots		107	
Turnout		14,179	66.60
Registered electors		21,291	
Majority		2,434	17.41
This was a new constituency created.
