= CityONE Megamall =

- Location: Kuching, Kuching Division, Sarawak, Malaysia
- Coordinates: 1.520147°N 110.355891°E
- Address: No. 1, Jalan Song, 93350 Kuching, Sarawak, Malaysia
- Opened: 2012; 14 years ago
- Developer: Kenbest Sdn. Bhd.
- Manager: CityONE MC Sdn. Bhd.
- Owner: CityONE MC Sdn. Bhd.
- Floor area: 1.5 million ft²
- Floors: 4
- Website: cityonemanagement.com.my

CityONE Megamall (Chinese: 一城悦荟美佳广场) is a shopping complex located in Kuching, Sarawak, Malaysia. It is owned by CityONE MC Sdn. Bhd. and completed in 2012 by Kenbest Sdn. Bhd.

== Architecture ==
CityONE Megamall has a total floor area of approximately 1.5 million square feet over four storeys. Its exterior design draws inspiration from the Beijing National Stadium and incorporates Sarawak's significance of bird’s nest products. The steel lines forming the "nest" alone cost RM 6.1 million, and if laid end-to-end would stretch up to five kilometres. The overall construction was cost around RM 15 million.

The mall is divided into three main retail zones, namely "zone ABCD", the "inner mall" and "mall 2". It is fully air-conditioned and equipped with escalators and elevators.

== Tenants ==
CityONE Megamall houses a total of 400 retail outlets. Notable tenants include Metrojaya, Golden Screen Cinemas, and Celebrity Fitness. Other establishments within the mall include the Japanese restaurant Rising Ramen (雷神), the supermarket Everrise (永昇), and the Spay Global office, among others.

== Incident ==
On 4 December 2018, at around 3:30 p.m., a massive explosion occurred near the Korean restaurant Nene Chicken. Three people were killed; two of them employees of the restaurant and the third a construction worker involved in renovation works at the premises (naming O Kui Lim (胡貴麟, 49) from Batu Kawa, Kuching, Tchee Kiam Jong (徐健永, 24) from Stutong, Kuching and Chin Hsien Loong (陳顯龍, 29) from Butterworth, Penang), while 41 others were injured. The blast caused part of the mall’s ceiling to collapse. Investigations determined that the explosion was caused by incompetency of the installer, whereby "short cut" was made on the installation of the fuel gas piping.
