= Chan Seng Khai =

Malaysian politician

- 田承凯

2nd Kuching South Mayor
- In office 1 January 1997 – 31 July 2005
- Deputy: Mohd Amin Hassan
- Preceded by: Song Swee Guan
- Succeeded by: Chong Ted Tsiung

Personal details
- Born: 19 July 1953 (age 71); Kuching, Crown Colony of Sarawak
- Citizenship: Malaysian
- Political party: Sarawak United Peoples' Party (SUPP) - Barisan Nasional

Chan Seng Khai (simplified Chinese: 田承凯; traditional Chinese: 田承凱; pinyin: Tián Chéngkǎi; Jyutping: Tin4 Sing4 Hoi2; Pe̍h-ōe-jī: Chhân Sêng-khái) was the second mayor of Kuching South City Council since 1997. He succeeded Datuk Song Swee Guan, who was the first mayor of the city, in 1988 when Kuching was elevated to City status and partitioned into South and North. Chan is a member of Sarawak United People's Party and elected state assemblyman of the Batu Lintang area in Kuching in 1991, 1996 and 2001. In 2006, during the Sarawak's state election, he lost in his re-election bid as state assemblyman to Democratic Action Party (DAP) candidate Voon Lee Shan.
