= The Spring Shopping Mall =

Shopping mall in Kuching, Sarawak, Malaysia

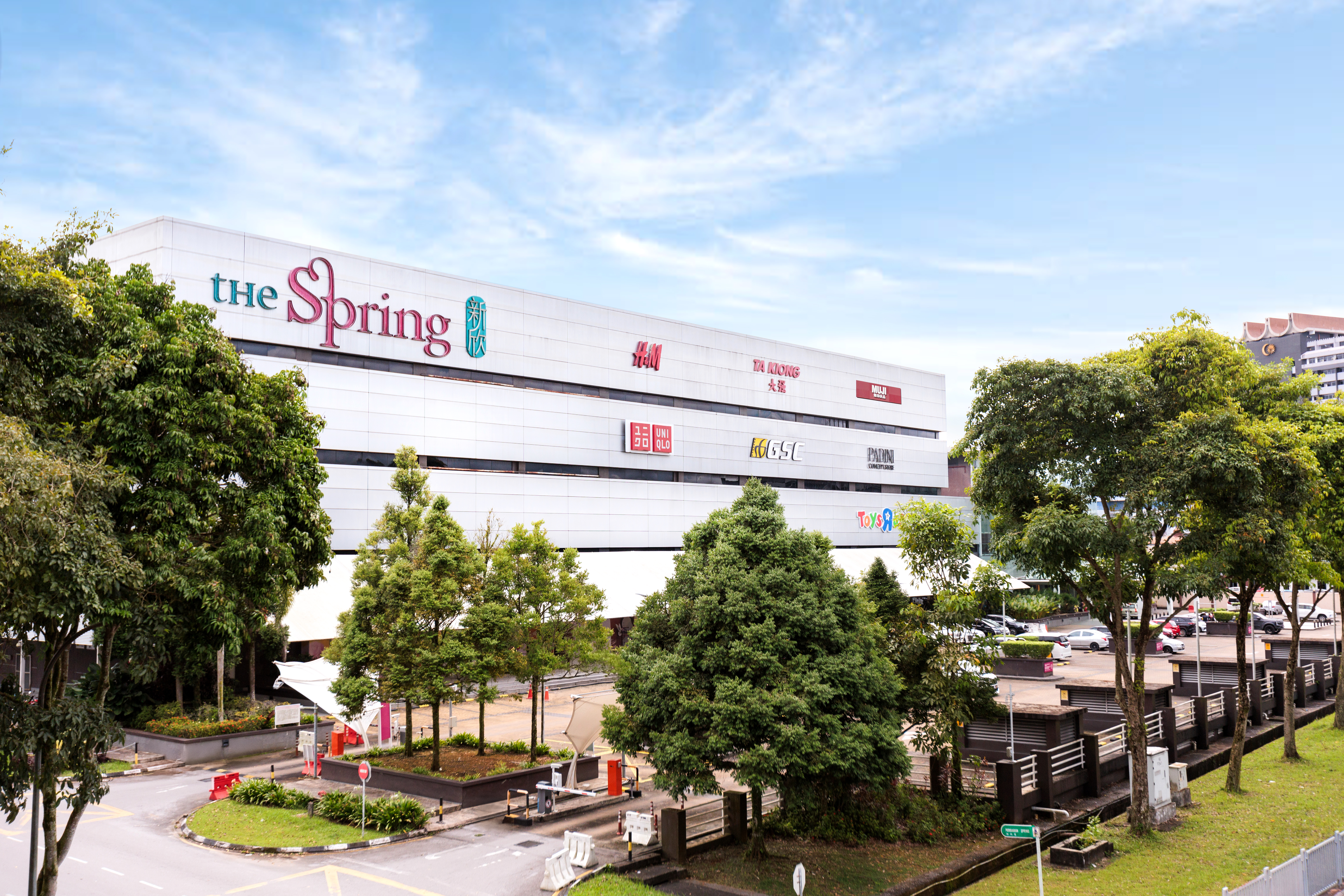
- The front facade of the mall
- Location: Kuching, Kuching Division, Sarawak, Malaysia
- Coordinates: 1.535619°N 110.357612°E
- Address: 304, Persiaran Kampung Kenyalang Park, 93300 Kuching, Sarawak, Malaysia
- Opened: 10 January 2008; 18 years ago
- Developer: PSB Realty Development Sdn. Bhd.
- Manager: The Spring Management Services Sdn. Bhd.
- Owner: PSB Realty Development Sdn. Bhd.
- Num. of stores: 118
- Num. of anchor tenants: 2 (Parkson, Ta Kiong Supermarket)
- Floor area: 420,000 sq ft (39,000 m^{2})
- Floors: 4
- Public transit: SM11 The Spring (to be completed)
- Website: www.thespring.com.my

The Spring Shopping Mall
- Traditional Chinese: 新欣購物廣場
- Simplified Chinese: 新欣购物广场
Transcriptions
Standard Mandarin
- Hanyu Pinyin: Xīnxīn Gòuwù Guǎngchǎng

The Spring Shopping Mall is a shopping mall in Kuching, Sarawak, Malaysia. Located at Persiaran Spring, it was opened in January 2008. It was the largest mall in Sarawak since its establishment until Boulevard Shopping Mall opened in 2013.

The mall's two anchor tenants are Parkson and Ta Kiong Supermarket.

The Spring Shopping Mall has the capacity to house more than 150 shopping outlets spread out over three above-ground floors and a basement.

== Retail outlets ==
Aside from its main anchor tenants, The Spring Shopping Mall contains several well-known international brands. These include fashion names such as Calvin Klein, Coach New York, Cotton On, H&M, Kate Spade, Levi's, Michael Kors, Padini, Tommy Hilfiger and Uniqlo, lingerie stores including Pierre Cardin, Sorella, Triumph and Victoria's Secret, jewelry stores like Habib Jewels and Pandora, personal care and cosmetics stores such as Bath & Body Works, Babor, Dior, L'Occitane en Provence, Sephora and The Face Shop, the 100-yen shop Daiso, retail stores including Toys "R" Us, footwear firms like Bata Shoes, Hush Puppies and Skechers, chain stores such as Guardian, Sasa and Watsons, consumer electronics retail store like Huawei, Samsung and Sony, and the bookstore MPH.

In addition, a food court, several cafes and food stalls are located inside The Spring Shopping Mall, including Big Apple Donuts and Coffee, Boost Juice, Kenny Rogers Roasters, KFC, Llaollao, Nando's, Secret Recipe, Starbucks and Tealive.

== Entertainment ==
The most well-known of entertainment options at The Spring Shopping Mall is MBO Cinemas, an eight-screen cineplex. The cineplex, which opened in June 2009, was MBO Cinemas' first outlet in East Malaysia and simultaneously introduced 3D film to Sarawak.

== Location ==
The Spring Shopping Mall is located before the Jalan Simpang Tiga flyover. It also lies directly opposite another mall, the ST3 Shopping Mall, which is accessible through a linked pedestrian bridge. The mall is also located near the Kuching International Airport and the city's central business district, which is about 15 minutes away by car, as well as the Swinburne University of Technology and various government offices.

== Transportation ==
The Spring Shopping Mall has a designated pick-up and drop-off zone for buses, taxicabs, Grab vehicles, and other ride-hailing services. There is a pedestrian bridge to ST3 Shopping Mall, which is served by Kuching City Public Link buses K8 and K11.

Once completed, the mall will also be connected using the Kuching Urban Transportation System via SM11 The Spring ART station on the Blue Line which serves as its namesake and will be located across the outskirts of the mall.

== See also ==
- List of shopping malls in Malaysia
