= Wee Han Wen =

Malaysian architect

Chinese name
- Traditional Chinese: 黃漢文
- Simplified Chinese: 黄汉文
Transcriptions
Standard Mandarin
- Hanyu Pinyin: Huáng Hànwén
Southern Min
- Hokkien POJ: Ûiⁿ Hànbûn

Dato' Wee Han Wen is a Malaysian architect. He did his architectural studies in Australia. In 1998 he was appointed as chairman of the Miri Municipal Council.

On 20 May 2005, when Miri attained city status, Wee was appointed the first chairman of the Miri City Commission.

In 2003, Wee was awarded the Pingat Panglima Setia Bintang Sarawak (PSBS) in 2003, which carries the title of "Dato'".
