= FanXT =

Fantasy sports platform

- Industry: Fantasy Sports, Daily Fantasy Sports
- Founded: 10 March 2010
- Headquarters: Kuala Lumpur, Malaysia
- Area served: Worldwide
- Website: FanXT

FanXT is a fantasy sports site that provides fantasy sports platforms, namely for The Football Association, MotoGP, and Formula One. They are one of the first to develop a fantasy platform for the Premier League which allows users to set up their own leagues and act as commissioners, and the first few that launched a daily fantasy sports platform for football (soccer). They are also the official provider of fantasy platforms for the Finnish Football League, Hong Kong First Division League, I-League, United Football League (Philippines) and S.League. FanXT is supported by the GIST Initiative programme, a partnership led by the U.S. Department of State and implemented by CRDF Global

FanXT launched the first ever fantasy soccer game for AFC Asian Cup 2011 and AFF Suzuki Cup 2012. It is also currently the official digital media provider for the Philippines’ United Football League

Grand Perfecta Inc acquired FanXT in January 2016.

== Game formats ==
FanXT provides platforms for multiple fantasy sports including Premier League Fantasy, Champions League, Spanish Liga, MotoGP, and the Fantasy F1. They are also the official providers of fantasy football platforms for Finland Veikkausliga, Hong Kong First Division Football League, India I-League, Philippines United Football League and Singapore S. League.

FanXT's Premier League platform, known as Fantasy Premier League Commissioner, allows users to start their own Premier League fantasy leagues and also choose a personal domain name for each league, in order to distinguish each league from the FanXT website; having the role of the league's commissioner. The users are allowed to customize the league, including setting overall budget, changing player values, defining fantasy scores, adding logo and banner, and allowing specific number of teams for the league.

On September 9, 2014, FanXT becomes the first to launch Daily Fantasy Sports for soccer for global users based on the Premier League known as Weekly Fantasy Premier League although on March 25, 2014, it had a soft launch of the similar game

== Awards ==
FanXT has received numerous awards and juga recognition, including being recognized by winning the Indus Entrepreneur Award as the winner of the TIE Global All-Asia Business Plan Competition in 2012. FanXT is a finalist in The Football Business Awards 2014 in the Best/Most Innovative Use of Technology (non club related) category together with Bloomberg Sports, FIFA, Sky Deutschland AG and more. The event is to be held on November 6, 2014

- Fantasy sport
- Daily Fantasy Sports
- Fantasy football (Association)
