= Borneo Cultures Museum =

Cultural museum in Kuching, Sarawak, Malaysia

Coordinates: 1.5555°N 110.3425°E

- Muzium Budaya Borneo
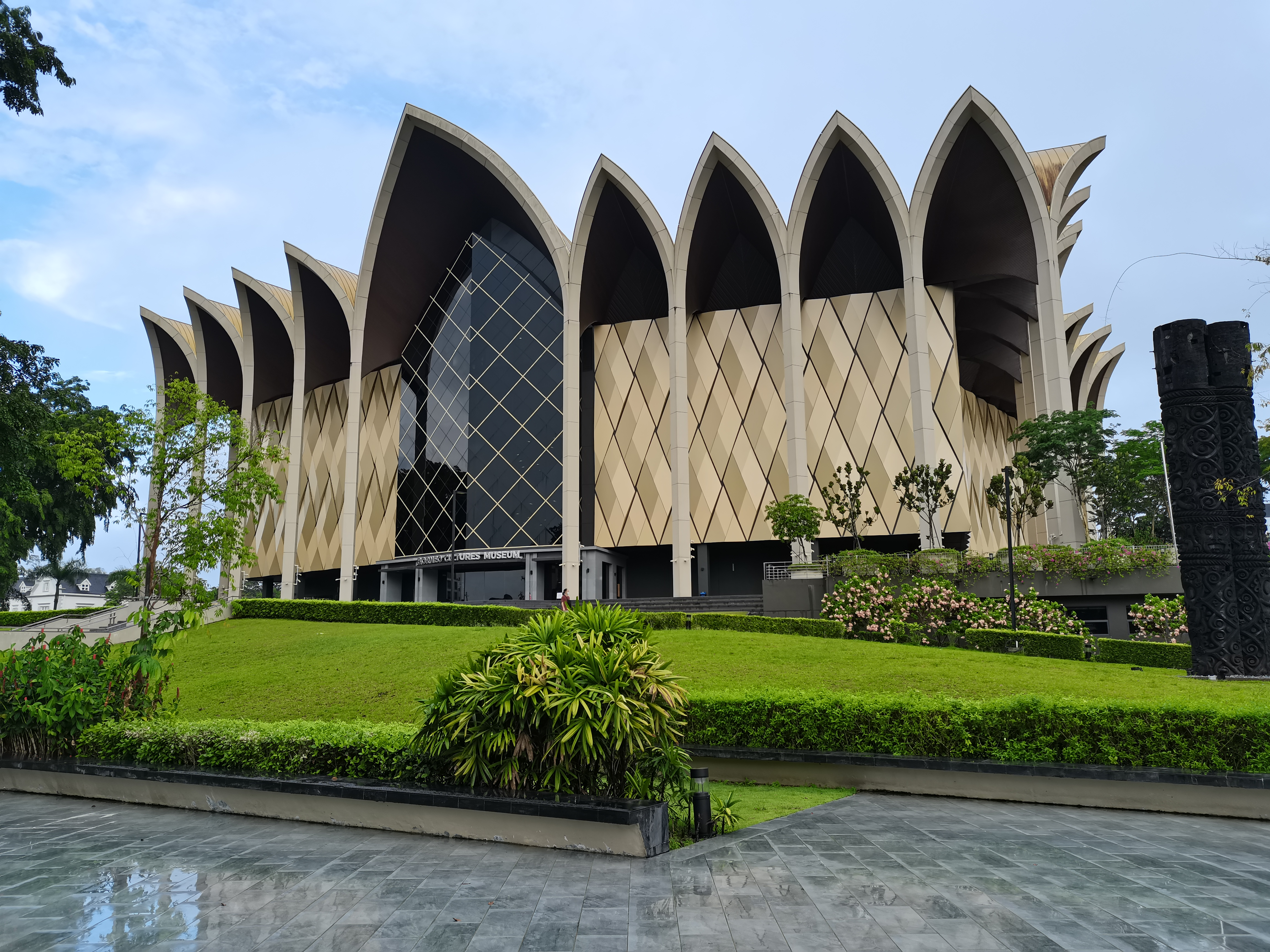
- Borneo Cultures Museum view from the garden
- Established: March 9, 2022
- Location: Kuching, Sarawak, Malaysia
- Visitors: 1,007,716 (14 May 2024)
- Architect: Dato’ Sri Ar John Lau Kah Sieng, Ar Voon Choon Hin, Florence Yeo Yinling and Lily Lau
- Owner: Sarawak Museum Department
- Website: museum.sarawak.gov.my/web/subpage/webpage_view/169

The Borneo Cultures Museum (Malay: Muzium Budaya Borneo) is a museum located in Kuching, Sarawak, Malaysia. It is the largest museum in Malaysia and the second largest in Southeast Asia. The museum displays artifacts relating to the history and cultural heritage of Sarawak’s local people, as well as others on Borneo island.

== History ==
The museum was under the Sarawak Museum Campus project which was a part of the Eleventh Malaysia Plan. The project was built on the demolished site of Dewan Tun Abdul Razak.

Construction of the museum was given approval in 2014 and was handled by Cahya Mata Sarawak through its subsidiary, PPES Works (Sarawak) Sdn. Bhd.. In total, the museum costed RM323 million which was covered by the Sarawak state government. This number breaks down to RM308 million for the construction and an additional RM15 million which was allocated for the digital facilities located within.

The opening was originally planned to be in 2020 but was delayed due to the COVID-19 pandemic. It was opened to the public on March 9, 2022.

== Architecture ==
The architectural design takes inspiration from traditional craft motifs from Sarawak and the New Sarawak State Legislative Assembly Building located nearby.

=== Interior and contents ===
Inside, the museum contains spaces for exhibitions as well as facilities like a conservation laboratory and storage space for museum collections.

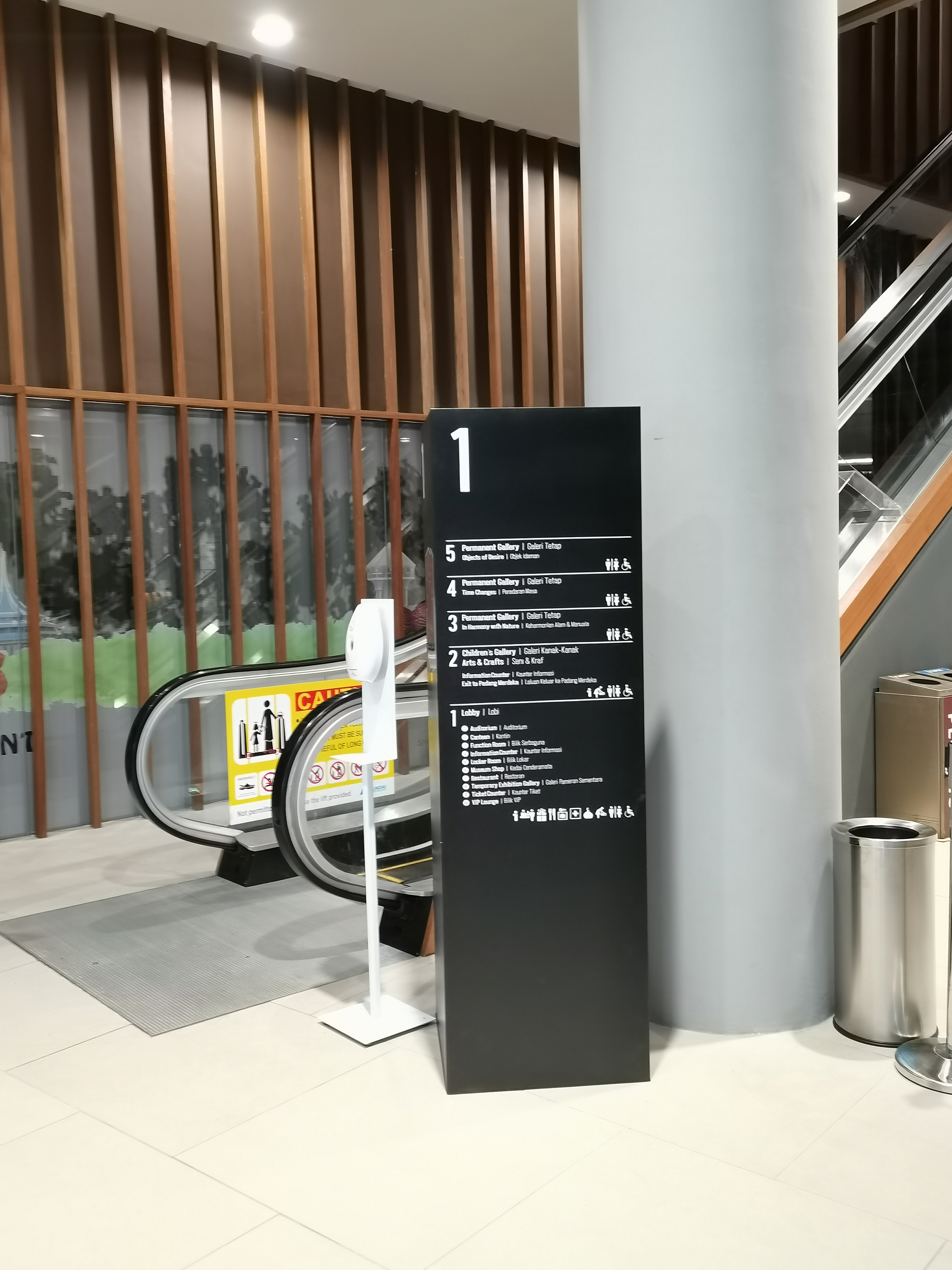
Museum directory

The exhibitions areas are located in the upper four floors and are separated into themes for each which are 'Love our Rivers’, ‘In Harmony with Nature’, ‘Time Changes’, and ‘Objects of Desire’.

This museum also features a children's gallery, where young visitors can embark on an adventure with the River Guardians in the Love Our Rivers exhibition to learn about the rivers of Sarawak. The Arts and Crafts gallery is a dynamic space for workshops on arts, crafts, and performances. In the In Harmony with Nature exhibition, visitors can discover stories about the people who live in Sarawak's coastal, rainforest, and highland regions. Meanwhile, the Time Changes gallery showcases the development and evolution of human settlements in Sarawak since the Palaeolithic period, featuring archaeological and historical artifacts. Lastly, the Object of Desire exhibition presents selected examples of material culture from the Sarawak Museum's collection.
