= Pending (district) =

District in Kuching, Malaysia

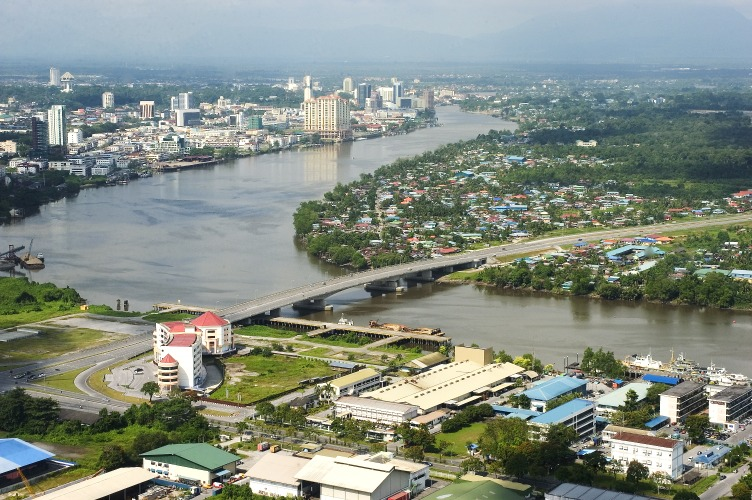
Pending Bridge (also known as Tun Salahuddin Bridge). Pending is visible to the left of the river.

Pending is a district in Kuching, Sarawak, Malaysia. Administratively, it is in the Kuching South City Council area. It is home to many local fishermen, mostly of Chinese ethnicity.

== Gallery ==
Japanese Surrender Point
