= Kampung Masan =

- Location within Borneo
- Coordinates: 1.35°N 110.4°E
- Country: Malaysia
- State: Sarawak
- Elevation: 71 m (233 ft)

Kampung Masan is a settlement in Sarawak, Malaysia. It lies approximately 27 kilometres (17 mi) south-south-east of the state capital Kuching, and just south of Siburan, close to the road from Kuching to Serian.

Neighbouring settlements include:

- Kampung Siga 0 kilometres (0.0 mi) north
- Kampung Duuh 0 kilometres (0.0 mi) north
- Siburan 1.9 kilometres (1.2 mi) north
- Kampung Tijirak 1.9 kilometres (1.2 mi) south
- Nineteenth Mile Bazaar 1.9 kilometres (1.2 mi) south
- Kampung Doras 2.6 kilometres (1.6 mi) northwest
- Kampung Batu Gong 3.7 kilometres (2.3 mi) east
- Batu Gong 4.1 kilometres (2.5 mi) northeast
- Kampung Beradau 4.1 kilometres (2.5 mi) northeast
