= Batu Kawa =

Batu Kawah
- City township
- Location in Borneo
- Coordinates: 1°30′50.58″N 110°18′52.74″E
- Country: Malaysia
- State: Sarawak
- Division: Kuching
- District: Kuching
- Municipality area: Padawan

Population (2026)
  - Total: 170,955
- Time zone: UTC+08:00 (Malaysian Standard Time)
- Postal code(s): 93250
- Area codes: +6082 (Landline) +6014 & +6016 (Mobile)
- ISO 3166 code: Part of MY-13

Batu Kawah is a modern city township area that located nearby Kuching City in Kuching Division, region of Sarawak in Malaysia. This city township area is currently owned under the Padawan Municipal Council (MPP). The Pan Borneo Highway passing through the area links Kuching City with Bau, Lundu and Sematan further west. This place is truly known to have many hornet nests and pineapple plantation in the past.

== Etymology ==
Batu Kawah can also be referred as Batu Kawa, a corrupted form of spelling. The name of Batu Kawah is derived from the Malay words which "Batu" means stone and "Kawah" means crater which refers to a type wok used to cook rice. Oftentimes, people misspell Batu Kawah as Batu Kawa. Kawa has no meaning in the Malay language and is a corrupted spelling. Sources say that Batu Kawah is named with reference to a bunch of wok shape stone beside Batu Kawah River.

== Economic activities ==
According to the survey by Padawan Municipal Council, Batu Kawah is mostly active in retail & wholesale business, financial & monetary, Sarawak digital economy sector, online business, education, healthcare, social and welfare activities, sports, leisure & event activities, architectural engineering, and also agrotechnology.

Economic activities in Batu Kawah (2025)
Economic activities	Percent
Retails	30%
Financial	19%
Education	17%
Healthcare	15%
Sports	8%
Social & welfare	7.2%
Agrotechnology	3%
Other activities	0.8%

== Governance ==
Batu Kawa forms one of the Sarawak state assembly district (Batu Kawah). During the Sarawak state election in 2011, DAP candidate; Christina Chiew Wang See won the seat against BN candidate Tan Joo Phoi. (50.9% vrs 47.2%)

In 2021 Sarawak state election, GPS candidate Sim Kui Hian won the seat against DAP candidate Kelvin Yii Lee Wuen with total 7,827 votes (or 70.2%).

No.	Constituency	Name	Political party	Notes
N13	Batu Kitang	Lo Khere Chiang	GPS	
N14	Batu Kawah	Sim Kui Hian	GPS	

== Demographics ==
=== Ethnics ===
As of 2026, Batu Kawah has a population of 170,955 people. Chinese is the major ethnic group in Batu Kawah with only 39%, followed by Iban (28%), Malays (17.5%), Bidayuh (10.6%), and Orang Ulu (2.4%).

Ethnic groups in Batu Kawah (2026)
Ethnics	Percent
Malays	17.5%
Chinese	39%
Iban	28%
Bidayuh	10.6%
Orang Ulu	2.4%
Melanau	0.8%
Indian	0.7%
Non-citizens	1%

=== Religions ===
According to a recent survey by Unit For Other Religions (UNIFOR) Sarawak in 2025, Christianity is the major religion in Batu Kawah area, followed by other religions such as Buddhism, Islam, folk religion, and Hinduism.

Religions in Batu Kawah (2025)
Ethnics	Percent
Christianity	48%
Buddhism	22%
Islam	20.7%
Folk religion	6.1%
Hinduism	1.5%
Other religions	0.8%
Irreligion	0.9%

== Geography ==
Batu Kawah originally known for the peat soil area. This is because there was a large pineapple, peppers, spices, and coconut plantation areas during the late 1970s until mid 1990s. At the same time, there is also hornet bee and goat farming activities in the past. However, the developments of Batu Kawah New Township (or simply known as MJC Batu Kawah) and most recent development of Pines Square City (also known as Pines Square) has completely transformed the overall Batu Kawah area.

== Developments ==
=== Batu Kawah New Township (MJC Batu Kawah) ===
Batu Kawah New Township, affectionately called "MJC" by Kuchingites, is a permanent modern garden city township development in Batu Kawah which provides the comfort and convenience to work, live, shop and play.

Batu Kawah New Township is a 275-acres integrated self-contained township planned with a whole array of modern facilities and amenities for your comfort. This city township officially owned by Mudajaya Group Berhad (formerly known as Mudajaya Corporation Berhad). Existing public amenities such as RHB Bank, restaurants, pharmacies, bus and taxi stand, police station, post office, 24-hour security assistance center, MJC Community Park, MJC Town Square, MJC Bazaar Square (formerly known as The Piazza MJC), public toilet, and public phone booths that provide convenience, recreation and security assistance to all the residents within this township.

Apart from that, Batu Kawah New Township also include other facilities such as SJK Chung Hua Sungai Tapang Hilir (a new completed Chinese primary school), SkyVilla Residences (a new residential condominium), Papillon Street Mall (a new modern street mall building), and many more.

In the near future, a new modern international school (St. Joseph International School) officially set to be built in the MJC Batu Kawah area.

=== Pines Square City, Batu Kawah ===
Pines Square City, also known widely as "Pines Square" by many people in Kuching, is a latest modern city township in Batu Kawah and also officially claimed to be newest development metropolitan city project after Batu Kawah New Township (MJC Batu Kawah).

This 480-acres Pines Square City originally owned by Lee Onn Development Sdn. Bhd. (a subsidiary development company under Lee Onn Group) and Exal Malaysia Sdn Bhd, which is contains eight different newest development areas, namely as Pines Square Commercial Center, Pines Residence, SÓL Estate Kuching (new modern housing estate in Batu Kawah), Abbertton Avenue (new residential apartment complex), SP Lodge Batu Kawah (Sri Pertiwi) (affordable public housing), KENSHO Townhouse (new residential housing estate), and a newest commercial city complex project Pines Square Parade, which is also includes a new mall building Pines Mall Batu Kawah (fully owned by IKEA Malaysia, Emart GOCELI, and The Big Canteen (Big Canteen Food Court)), new modern residential apartment complex (Pines Grove Residences), a new wet market building (Pines Square Market, Batu Kawah), a new public service area (PDRM & Bomba), a new extended commercial area Pines Ridge (Pines Premier), a new haemodialysis centre building, a new world-class football synthetic field area, and finally a new building of Sarawak Dayak National Union (SDNU) Cultural Complex, which is currently in construction.

=== Future developments in Batu Kawah ===
Batu Kawah will have more latest mega development project within three to seven years from now. This latest development projects including a new Second Batu Kawah Bridge (dual carriageway road bridge) that connects between Jalan Stephen Yong (via Jalan Kwong Thiong) and Moyan Junction (Moyan, Batu Kawah). This dual carriageway road bridge project officially started from 2026 until February 2029.

Meanwhile in flood disaster prevention management, Padawan Municipal Council (MPP) and Sarawak Government agreed to build the Sarawak River Bypass as the ultimate long-term flood mitigation project solution to protect riverside communities in Batu Kawah (mostly in Desa Wira areas, Kampung Sinar Budi Baru, and Kampung Rantau Panjang) from recurring floods exacerbated by climate change. This project is a new long-term flood disaster prevention management solution under Phase 2 of the Kuching City Flood Mitigation Plan.

Batu Kawah also ready to build the newest financial, commercial, & business hub complex that located in a new land area between Moyan (Batu Kawah) (via Greenery Heights, Moyan, Batu Kawah) and Sungai Pinang area (Bau). This mega project is fully inspired from the Tun Razak Exchange (TRX) Kuala Lumpur and also Milano Eight (Milano 8) development project in Jalan Wan Alwi, Kuching. This project also boosts more global investors, local entrepreneurs, and all communities to come and carry out business activities comprehensively in this hub complex.

Finally Batu Kawah also set the huge transformation for building a new expansive park & recreation area (based from the iconic KLCC Park, Kuala Lumpur) and a new modern shopping complex (inspired from Central i-City, i-City Shah Alam and Suria KLCC Kuala Lumpur). Located at the old TM SP Stapok land area in Jalan Stephen Yong, Batu Kawah, Kuching, it offers a huge transformative experience of recreation activities, lifestyle, shopping, exhibitions & events, and many more. At the same time, Batu Kawah will set to become "The KLCC of Sarawak" by the year 2034.

== Transportation ==
Batu Kawah area can be reached by two main roads named Jalan Batu Kawah-Tondong (Section of Pan Borneo Highway) and also Jalan Batu Kawah- Matang. Portion of Jalan Batu Kawah-Tondong separated by Sarawak River is linked with Jambatan Datuk Chong Kiun Kong. (Datuk Chong Kiun Kong Bridge), it has been upgraded to dual carriage bridge under RM16 million budget to ease the traffic congestion along Jalan Batu Kawa-Tondong.

In the near future, there are plans to run an ART line through Batu Kawah with the YL Yellow Line of the Kuching Urban Transportation System, although this will start after Phase 1 of the system has been completed.

== Other utilities ==
=== Small residential area ===
There are 12 small residential areas inside Batu Kawah:
Pekan Batu Kawa (Chinese: 石角), Stapok (Chinese: 尖山), Sin San Tu (Chinese: 新山肚), Moyan (Chinese: 味源港), Kim Choo Sing (Chinese: 金珠盛), Luo Zhi Gan (Chinese: 罗知港), Xia Sha Long（Chinese: 下沙垄）, Sungai Tapang (Chinese: 甲港), Rantau Panjang (Chinese: 上湾头), Sejijak (Chinese: 西里益), Sungai Tengah (Chinese: 葫芦顶), and Pangkalan Baru (Chinese: 新梯头).

=== Education ===
Because of population rapidly increase in Batu Kawah, there's a need to establishing schools for education, mostly primary and secondary schools. For example, SJK Chung Hua Sungai Tapang Hilir, Sekolah Kebangsaan (SK) Garland, Sekolah Menengah Kebangsaan Jalan Arang, and Sekolah Menengah Kebangsaan Batu Kawah.

There is only around 10 primary Chinese schools have been established during earlier day and have remained to serve the peoples till present.

Sunny Hill School (formerly known as Sekolah Menengah Sains (SMS) Sunny Hill) is the only private school that located at 3rd Mile, Batu Kawah.

Cyberjaya College Kuching is the only college campus in Batu Kawah (currently located inside Pines Square, Batu Kawah, Kuching). Until now there are no universities in the Batu Kawah area.

=== Place of worship ===
Currently there are 14 place of worship that are available in Batu Kawah area :

- Masjid Darul Ibadah (Town Mosque), Jalan Stapok Utama, Batu Kawah
- Surau Darul Sa'adah, Desa Wira, Batu Kawah
- Masjid Darul Muttaqin, Rantau Panjang, Batu Kawah
- Masjid Darul Aqsa, Kampung Segedup, Batu Kawah
- St. Mark's Catholic Church, Batu Kawah
- St. Basil Church, Batu Kawah
- Zhu En Methodist Church (SCAC), Batu Kawah
- Seventh Day Adventist (BM) Church, Jalan Stapok Selatan, Batu Kawah
- Kuching Seventh Day Adventist (English) Church, 3rd Mile, Sunny Hill Garden, Batu Kawah
- International Society for Krishna Consciousness, Jalan Ketitir, Batu Kawah
- Kuching Dhamma Vijaya Buddhist Centre, Jalan Kong Ping, Batu Kawah
- Guang Loong Temple, Batu Kawah Bazaar, Batu Kawah
- Wat Somdet Sangkharat Sukkhaithuen, Jalan Stephen Yong, Batu Kawah
- Soon Lee Temple, Sungai Tapang, Batu Kawah

=== List of attractions ===
- Batu Kawah Riverbank Park, Batu Kawah
- Sumiran Eco Park & Resort, Batu Kawah
- Borneo Happy Farm, Moyan, Batu Kawah
- The Rainbow Bridge Cafe & Bar, Batu Kawah Bazaar, Batu Kawah
- Semeba Trail & Sudat Trail (Rabak Semeba Recreational Park), Semeba, Batu Kawah
- Taman Rekreasi Batu Kawah, Jalan Batu Kawah, Batu Kawah
- Megalanes Sarawak, Batu Kawah, Kuching
- RESET Sportsplex, Pines Square City, Batu Kawah
- Sarawak Dayak National Union (SDNU) Cultural Centre, Pines Square City, Batu Kawah (under construction)
- Stadium Mini Batu Kawah (Batu Kawah Mini Stadium), Pines Square City, Batu Kawah (future development)

== Gallery ==
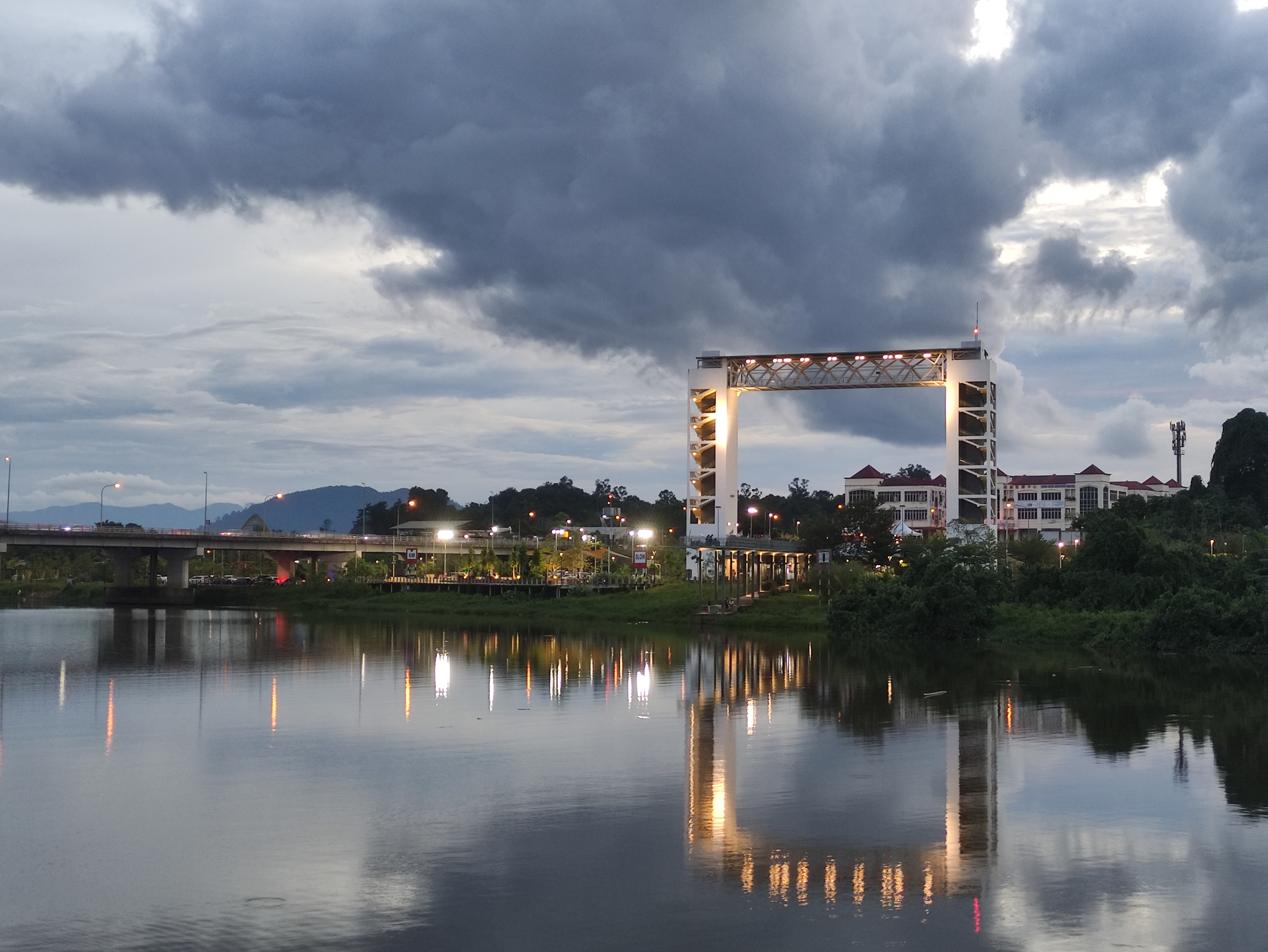
Batu Kawa Riverbank Park

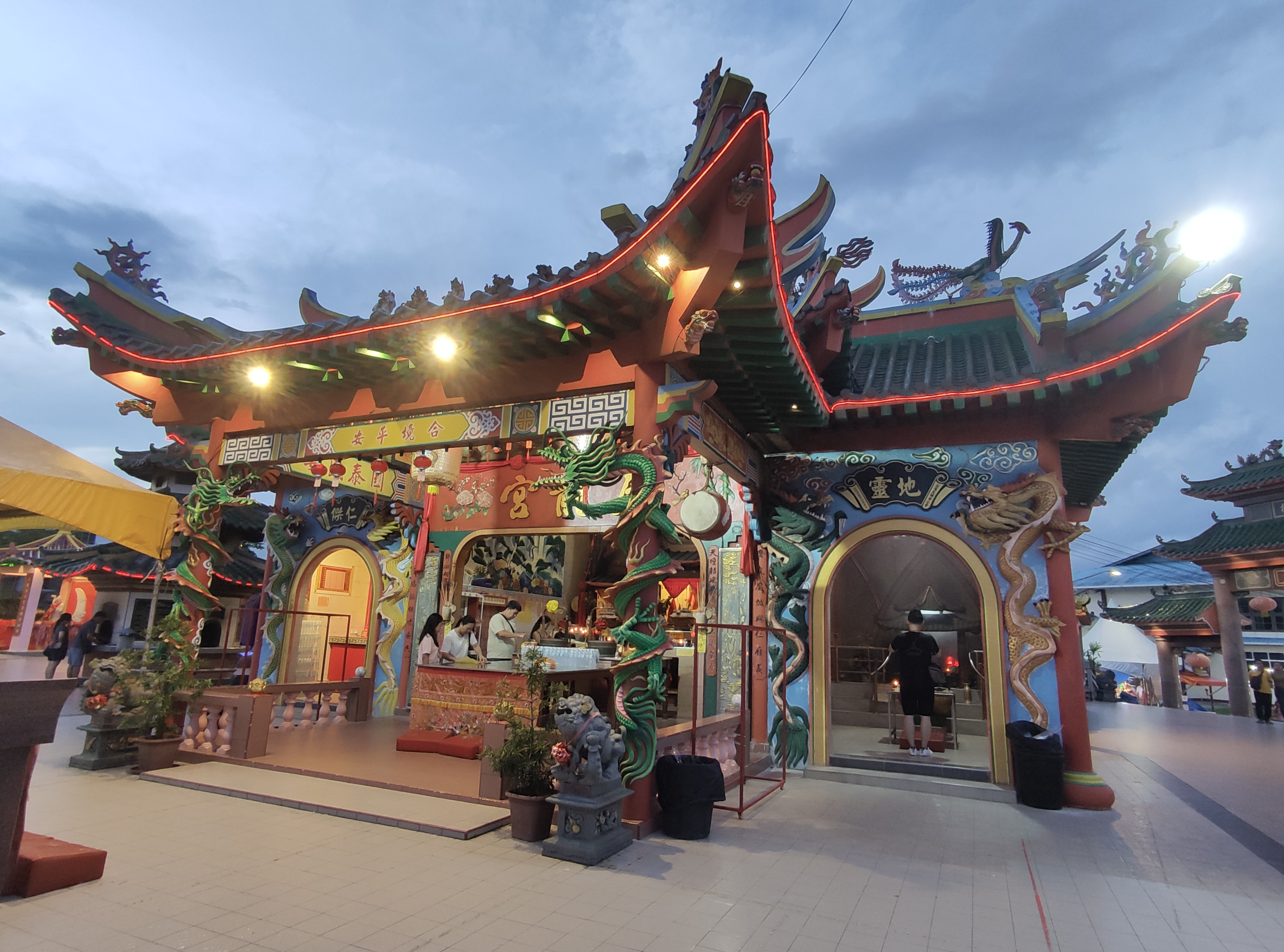
Guang Loong Temple

== See also ==
- Kota Samarahan
- Serian
- Simanggang
