= Kampung Doras =

- Location within Borneo
- Coordinates: 1.36667°N 110.38333°E
- Country: Malaysia
- State: Sarawak
- Administrative Division: Kuching
- Elevation: 60 m (200 ft)

Kampung Doras is a settlement in the Kuching division of Sarawak, Malaysia. It lies approximately 24.7 kilometres (15 mi) south-south-east of the state capital Kuching, south of the road from Kuching to Serian.

Neighbouring settlements include:

- Siburan 1.9 kilometres (1.2 mi) east
- Fifteenth Mile Bazaar 2.6 kilometres (1.6 mi) northwest
- Kampung Sekeduk Baharu 2.6 kilometres (1.6 mi) northwest
- Kampung Duuh 2.6 kilometres (1.6 mi) southeast
- Kampung Siga 2.6 kilometres (1.6 mi) southeast
- Kampung Masan 2.6 kilometres (1.6 mi) southeast
- Kampung Mambong 3.7 kilometres (2.3 mi) west
- Kampung Sidanu 4.1 kilometres (2.5 mi) northwest
- Kampung Simboh 4.1 kilometres (2.5 mi) southwest
