= Kuching (disambiguation) =

Kuching primarily refers to Kuching City, a city in Malaysia.

Kuching may also refer to:

- Kuching Division, an administrative Division in Sarawak, Malaysia
- Kuching District, a district within Kuching Division
- Bandar Kuching (federal constituency), represented in the Dewan Rakyat
