= Padawan =

Padawan may refer to:

- Padawan, Sarawak, Malaysia, a subdistrict
- Padawan municipality, Sarawak
- Padawan (federal constituency), Sarawak
- Padawan (Star Wars), an apprentice of the fictional Jedi Order in the Star Wars franchise
