= Lo Khere Chiang =

Malaysian politician

Yang Berhormat Dato Ir. Lo Khere Chiang PSBS JBK MLA
- 罗克强

Chairman of Padawan Municipal Council
- In office 2010–2023
- Governor: Abang Muhammad Salahuddin (2010-2014); Abdul Taib Mahmud (2014-2023)
- Chief Minister: Abdul Taib Mahmud (2010-2014); Adenan Satem (2014-2017); Abang Johari (2017-2022)
- Premier: Abang Johari (2022-2023)
- Succeeded by: Tan Kai

Member of the Sarawak State Legislative Assembly for Batu Kitang
- Incumbent
- Assumed office 2016
- Preceded by: Constituency created

Personal details
- Born: Lo Khere Chiang; 9 March 1972 (age 54) Sarawak
- Citizenship: Malaysian
- Party: SUPP
- Other political affiliations: Barisan Nasional (till 2018); Gabungan Parti Sarawak (since 2018)
- Occupation: Politician
- Profession: Engineer

Lo Khere Chiang is a Malaysian politician from SUPP. He has served as the Member of the Sarawak State Legislative Assembly for Batu Kitang since 2016.

== Political career ==
Lo is the Deputy Secretary-General of SUPP. He served as Chairman of Padawan Municipal Council from 2010 to 2023.

== Election results ==
Parliament of Malaysia
Year	Constituency	Candidate	Votes	Pct.	Opponent(s)	Votes	Pct.	Ballots cast	Majority	Turnout
2022	P196 Stampin	Lo Khere Chiang (SUPP)	32,152	43.59%	Chong Chieng Jen (DAP)	39,310	53.30%	73,759	7,158	60.95%
2022	P196 Stampin	Lo Khere Chiang (SUPP)	32,152	43.59%	Lue Cheng Hing (PSB)	2,291	3.11%	73,759	7,158	60.95%

Sarawak State Legislative Assembly
Year	Constituency	Candidate	Votes	Pct.	Opponent(s)	Votes	Pct.	Ballots cast	Majority	Turnout
2016	N13 Batu Kitang	Lo Khere Chiang (SUPP)	6,466	53.48%	Abdul Aziz Isa Marindo (DAP)	4,626	38.26	12,256	1,840	70.06%
2016	N13 Batu Kitang	Lo Khere Chiang (SUPP)	6,466	53.48%	Voon Shiak Ni (PKR)	883	7.30%	12,256	1,840	70.06%
2016	N13 Batu Kitang	Lo Khere Chiang (SUPP)	6,466	53.48%	Sulaiman Kadir (IND)	61	0.50%	12,256	1,840	70.06%
2016	N13 Batu Kitang	Lo Khere Chiang (SUPP)	6,466	53.48%	Othman Bojeng (IND)	54	0.45%	12,256	1,840	70.06%
2021	N13 Batu Kitang	Lo Khere Chiang (SUPP)	6,307	57.66%	Abdul Aziz Isa Marindo (DAP)	2,144	19.60%	11,096	4,163	53.29%
2021	N13 Batu Kitang	Lo Khere Chiang (SUPP)	6,307	57.66%	Liu Thian Leong (PSB)	1,812	16.57%	11,096	4,163	53.29%
2021	N13 Batu Kitang	Lo Khere Chiang (SUPP)	6,307	57.66%	Wong Tun Teck (PBK)	675	6.17%	11,096	4,163	53.29%

== Honours ==
- Sarawak
  - Commander of the Most Exalted Order of the Star of Sarawak (PSBS) – Dato (2023)
  - Companion of the Order of the Star of Hornbill Sarawak (JBK) (2020)
