= Balai Ringin =

Balai Ringin Daerah kecil Balai Ringin داءيره كچيل بالاي ريڠين
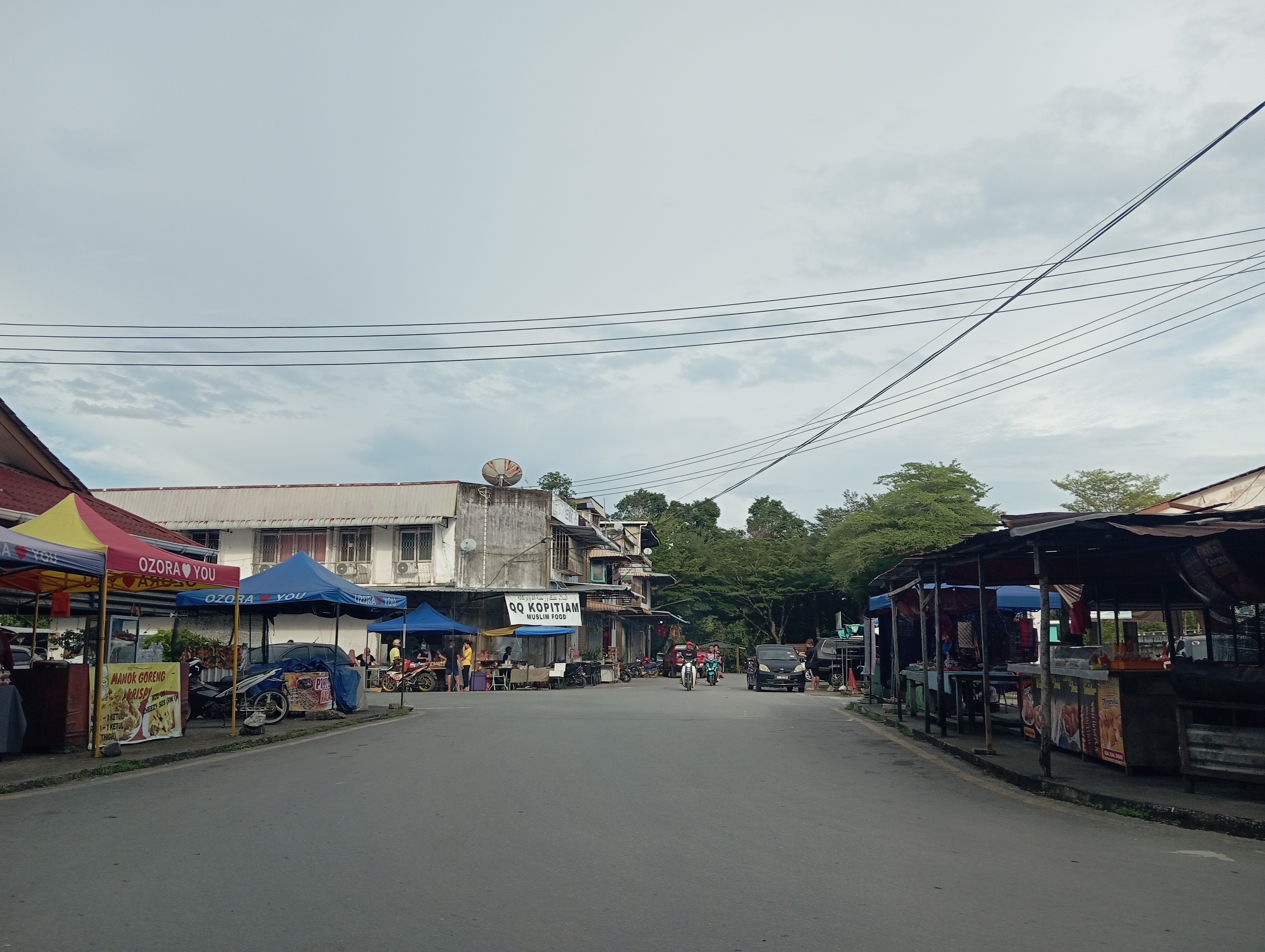
- Balai Ringin town

- Location within Borneo
- Coordinates: 1.05°N 110.75°E
- Country: Malaysia
- State: Sarawak
- Elevation: 76 m (249 ft)

Balai Ringin is a town, constituency and autonomous sub-district in Serian Division, Sarawak, Malaysia, about half an hour drive from Serian town along the Pan Borneo Highway.

== Location ==
Located in the southeast corner of Serian Division, Balai Ringin is adjacent to the Indonesian border. It lies approximately 75.3 kilometres (47 mi) southeast of the state capital Kuching.

== Demographics ==
The area is predominantly inhabited by Iban tribespeople, though there are also a few Malay villages.

== Government and politics ==
Previously part of Simunjan District of the Samarahan Division, it was sliced off from the former in 2021 and transferred to the Serian Division and granted autonomy. This represented the division's second expansion after the annexation of Siburan District from Kuching Division in 2015.

Balai Ringin is part of Greater Kuching Coordinated Development Agency (GKCDA) area, along with Kuching, Samarahan, Serian, and Bau.

=== Parliamentary constituency ===
Serian and Sri Aman

=== State constituency ===
Neighbouring settlements include:

- Kampung Sepan 2.6 kilometres (1.6 mi) northwest
- Kampung Bayur 2.6 kilometres (1.6 mi) southwest
- Kampung Batu Kudi 3.7 kilometres (2.3 mi) west
- Kampung Muboi 3.7 kilometres (2.3 mi) west
- Kampung Linsat 3.7 kilometres (2.3 mi) west

== Buses ==
Route No.	Operating Route	Operator
12	Serian-Balai Ringin	Serian Kedup Transport
