= Miss International Sarawak 2023 =

Beauty contest in Malaysia

- Date: July 28, 2023
- Venue: The Waterfront Hotel, Kuchin
- Entrants: 13
- Placements: 5
- Winner: Aaliyah Wunsch; Kuching

Miss International Sarawak 2023 was the 1st Miss International Sarawak pageant, which was held at The Waterfront Hotel, Kuching on 28 July 2023.

13 contestants from all over Sarawak participated in this year's pageant. 18-year-old Aaliyah Wunsch from Kuching was crowned as the winner on 28 July 2023. She represented Sarawak at the national level of Miss International Malaysia 2023 where she placed third runner-up to the eventual winners Cassandra Yap and Ashlynn Ooi.

== Background ==
=== Selection of participants ===
The contestant must be a single Sarawakian female aged between 18 and 28 years old, and participation of women who are married or have had children is prohibited. The Sarawak Center of Technology Excellence in Kuching was chosen to be the venue of the first audition held on 15 June 2023. The second audition was held at The Waterfront Hotel, Kuching on 1 July 2023.

== Result ==
=== Placements ===
Placement	Contestant	Placement at National Level
Miss International Sarawak 2023	06 – Aaliyah Wunsch	3rd runner-up; Miss Photogenic
1st runner-up	12 – Hannah Musa	Top 8
2nd runner-up	11 – Joanna Eve Presley	Unplaced; Miss Congeniality
3rd runner-up	03 – Lee Min Qi	Unplaced
4th runner-up	09 – Jasie Yong	Unplaced
5th runner-up	07 – Glynnis Grace	Unplaced
Top 8	04 – Maria Misha; 10 – Gracelyn Tigang	

== Pageant ==
=== Selection committee ===
- Datin Jacqueline Ngu – Miss Malaysia World 1993
- Datin Janice Wan – Philanthropist
- Dato Aaron Von Jolly – Co-founder of Von Jolly Couture
- Shahren Yusri – General Manager of CENTEXS Commercial
- Sarina Ali – Head of Rozsalle Beauty Academy
- Penelope Ling – Miss Tourism Malaysia 2007
- Melissa Francis – Sarawakian singer
- Sapphire Wong – Miss Cheongsam Sarawak 2016

== Contestants ==
14 contestants competed for the title.

No.	Contestant	Age (Note: Ages at the time of the pageant)	Hometown	Placement
01	Clera Pungi	26	Kuching	
02	Sasha Bella	26	Kuching	
03	Lee Min Qi	23	Kuching	3rd runner-up
~~04~~	Amber Pillar (Note: Quit before the finals)	18	Kuching	
04	Maria Misha	26	Bintulu	Top 8
05	Maybelline Liew	26	Kuching	
06	Aaliyah Wunsch	18	Kuching	Miss International Sarawak 2023
07	Glynnis Grace	20	Kuching	Top 8
08	Fiona Teo	18	Kuching	
09	Jasie Yong Zi Qin	22	Miri	4th runner-up
10	Gracelyn Tigang	20	Bintulu	Top 8
11	Joanna Eve Presley	21	Padawan	2nd runner-up
12	Hannah Musa	23	Limbang	1st runner-up
13	Alya Ameera Suhaidi	25	Kuching	

== Notes ==
1. Ages at the time of the pageant
2. Quit before the finals
