= Cosmopterix xuthogastra =

Scientific classification
- Kingdom: Animalia
- Phylum: Arthropoda
- Class: Insecta
- Order: Lepidoptera
- Family: Cosmopterigidae
- Genus: Cosmopterix
- Species: C. xuthogastra

Binomial name
- Cosmopterix xuthogastra (Meyrick, 1910)

Synonyms
- Cosmopteryx xuthogastra Meyrick, 1910

Species of moth

Cosmopterix xuthogastra is a moth of the family Cosmopterigidae. It is known from Kuching, Sarawak (Malaysian Borneo).

The wingspan is 8–9 mm (0.31–0.35 in).
