= Padawan municipality =

- Municipality
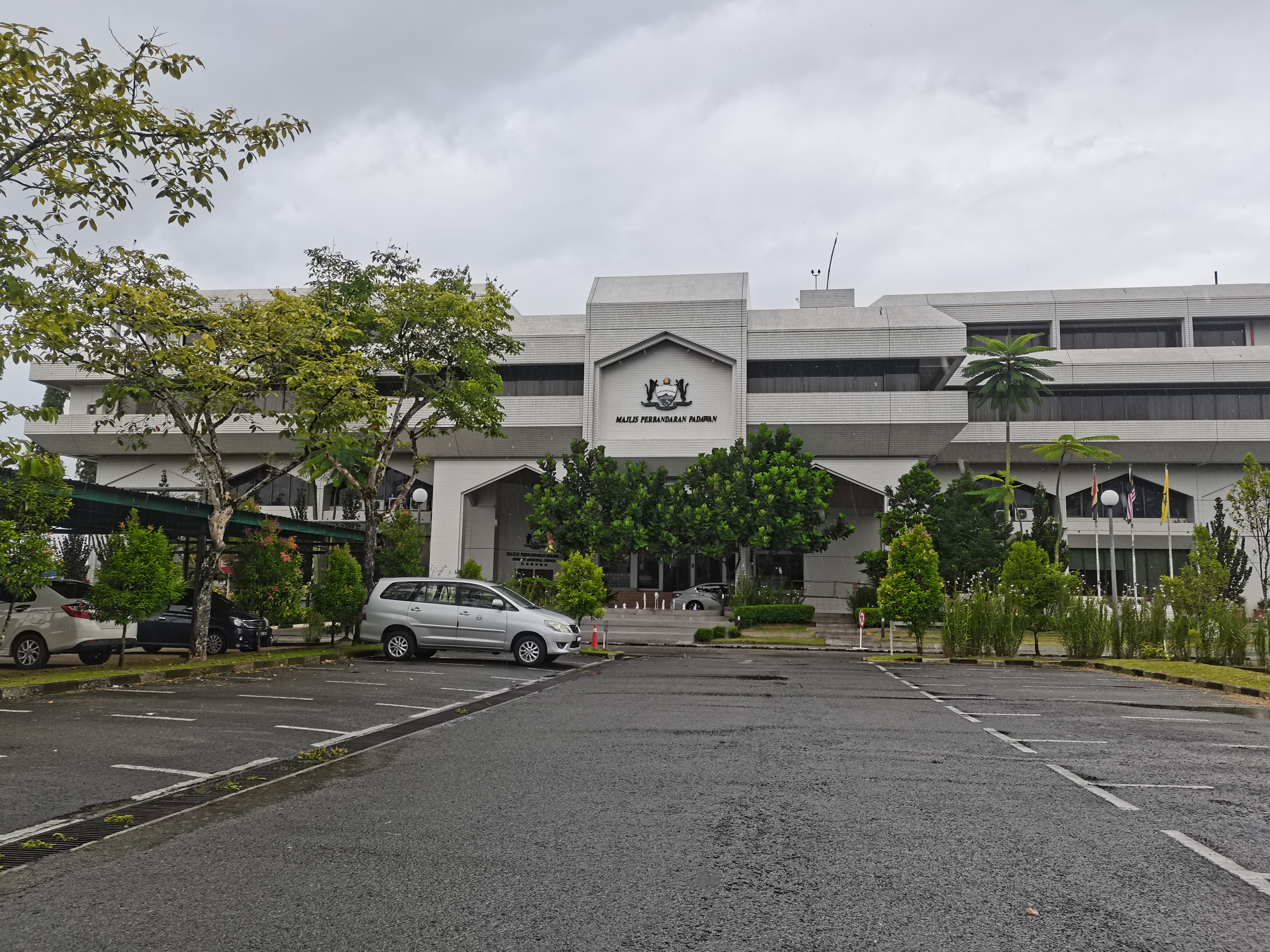
- The Padawan Municipal Council building

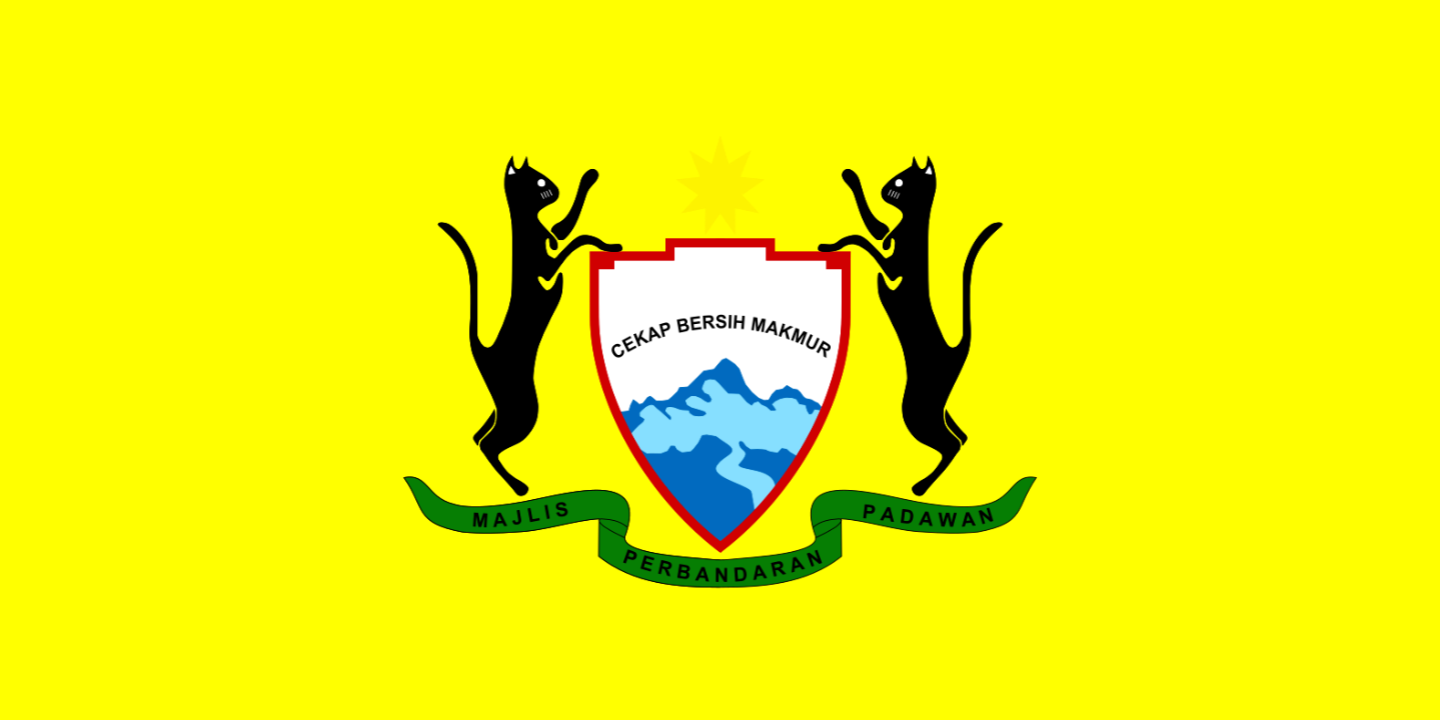
- Flag Seal
- Motto: Cekap Bersih Makmur (Efficient, Clean, and Prosperous)
- Location in Malaysia
- Coordinates: 1°33′0″N 110°20′7″E
- Country: Malaysia
- State: Sarawak
- Division: Kuching Division
- District: Kuching District
- First settled: Circa AD 600s (7th century)
- Incorporation (Municipality): 1 August 1996

Government
  - Type: Local government
  - Chairman: Tan Kai

Area
  - Padawan municipality: 1,771.3 km^{2} (683.9 sq mi)

Population (2026)
  - Padawan municipality: 170,955 (Batu Kawah); 66,340 (Kota Sentosa); 61,214 (Kota Padawan); 50,668 (Siburan); 44,501 (Telaga Air)
- Time zone: UTC+8 (MST)
  - Summer (DST): Not observed
- Postal code: ● 93050 KUCHING (Matang, Sejijak, Telaga Air, and Trombol) ● 93250 KUCHING (Batu Kawah, Batu Kitang, Kota Sentosa, Penrissen, and Kota Padawan)
- International dialling code prefix: +6082 (Landline only)
- Vehicle registration plate prefix: QAA , QAB , and QK (for all vehicles except taxis); HQ (for taxis only)
- Website: www.mpp.gov.my

Padawan Municipal Council (MPP) denotes the area of Padawan municipality

The Padawan municipality is a collective name given to a subset of the Kuching District area which is not administered locally by the Kuching South City Council and the Kuching North City Hall, formerly known as Kuching Rural district. It has an area of 1771.3 km^{2}, covering the suburbs of the Kuching Proper subdistrict and Padawan subdistrict. The area is currently administered by the local government named Padawan Municipal Council, based in Kota Padawan, located at 10th mile (16 km) from Kuching city centre. As of 2026, the overall population of entire Padawan municipality area is 358,900 residents.

== Etymology ==
The origin of the name "Padawan" came from the combination of Bidayuh words namely Padja and Birawan. There is a story of a Bidayuh village elder named Kinyau stayed in an area named Sibanyai 900 years ago. One day, he discovered white beads which has mystical healing power and they called it Birawan. These beads can also bring peace, prosperity, and tranquility to the area. The village elder has an eldest son named Padja. Therefore, the village elder decided to rename the area as "Padawan" in memory of his son and the mystical beads.

== Areas ==
=== Batu Kawah ===
Batu Kawah is a main city for Padawan municipality area. With total population of 170,955 residents, Batu Kawah is also develop rapidly modern city township area that located nearby Kuching City in Kuching Division, state of Sarawak. This city township is administratively owned under the Padawan Municipal Council (MPP). This area is truly known to have hornet bee & goat farming activities and also the pineapple & coconut plantation activities in the past.

Settlement areas in Batu Kawah :

- Everbright Estate, Batu Kawah
- Rancangan Perumahan Rakyat (RPR) Batu Kawah
- Taman Union (Union Park), Batu Kawah
- Taman Stapok (Stapok Utara & Stapok Selatan), Batu Kawah
- Taman Seri Emas, Batu Kawah
- Bandar Baru Batu Kawah (MJC Batu Kawah)
- Pines Square City, Batu Kawah
- Taman Desa Wira, Batu Kawah
- Kampung Segedup, Batu Kawah
- Kampung Stapok, Batu Kawah
- Batu Kawah Old Bazaar (Bazar Lama Batu Kawah), Batu Kawah
- Kampung Sinar Budi Baru, Batu Kawah
- Kampung Sinar Budi Lama, Batu Kawah
- Kampung Rantau Panjang, Batu Kawah
- Kampung Sandong, Batu Kawah
- Taman Kwong Thiong, Batu Kawah
- Kampung Sudat, Batu Kawah
- Kampung Semeba, Batu Kawah
- Taman Sri Moyan, Moyan, Batu Kawah
- Taman Genesis, Moyan, Batu Kawah
- Taman Moyan Jaya 2, Moyan, Batu Kawah
- Kampung Sin San Tu, Moyan, Batu Kawah
- Kampung Kim Choo Seng, Moyan, Batu Kawah

Attraction spots in Batu Kawah area :

- Batu Kawah Riverbank Park, Batu Kawah
- Sumiran Eco Park & Resort, Batu Kawah
- Borneo Happy Farm, Batu Kawah
- Masjid Darul Ibadah (Town Mosque), Taman Seri Emas, Batu Kawah
- Guang Loong Temple, Batu Kawa Bazaar, Batu Kawah
- St. Mark's Catholic Church, Batu Kawah
- The Rainbow Bridge Bar & Cafe, Batu Kawa Bazaar, Batu Kawah
- Tuang Schist Semeba (Country Hill), Semeba, Batu Kawah
- Semeba & Sudat Trail, Kampung Semeba, Batu Kawah
- RESET Sportsplex, Pines Square, Batu Kawah
- Pines Mall (Goceli Mall), Pines Square, Batu Kawah
- Batu Kawah Megamall, Jalan Stephen Yong (via Jalan Batu Kawa), Batu Kawah (currently in final proposal stage, full-scale constructions set to begin in early 2027.)

=== Kota Padawan ===
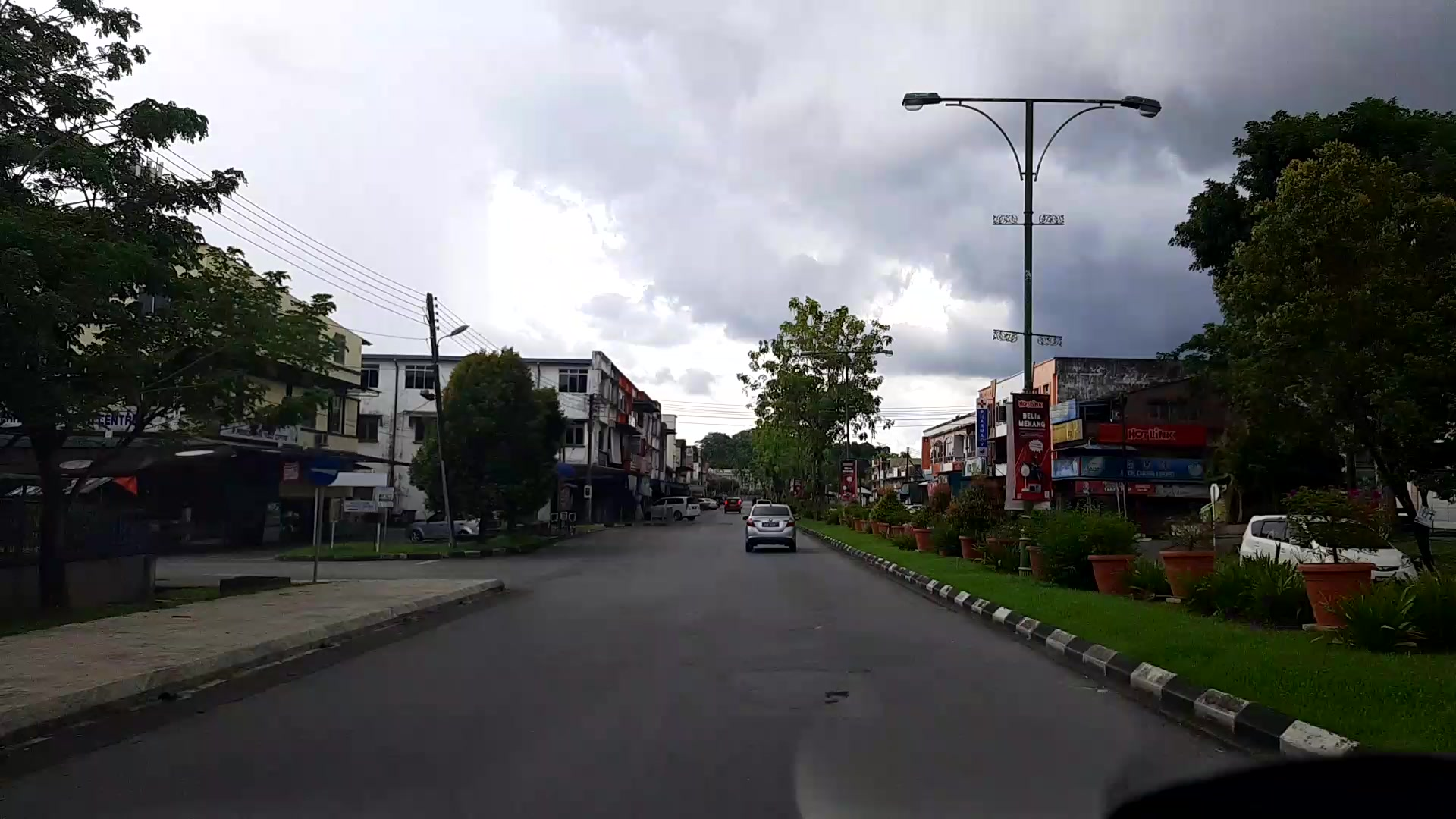
Pekan Kota Padawan street view.

Kota Padawan is a sub-area inside the Padawan municipality area. Back in late 1970s, only around 5,000 residents permanently lived in this sub-area. Kampung Betong Landeh, Kampung Sebua Melayu, Kampung Sebua, and Kampung Paya Mebi are the village areas that first existed before Kota Padawan Town (Pekan Kota Padawan) was built.

Settlement areas in Kota Padawan area :

- Taman Kuap, Kota Padawan
- Landeh Cinle, Kota Padawan
- Taman Landeh, Kota Padawan
- Taman Indah Landeh (Taman Sri Permai), Landeh, Kota Padawan
- Kampung Paya Mebi, Landeh, Kota Padawan
- Kampung Sebua, Landeh, Kota Padawan
- Kampung Betong, Landeh, Kota Padawan
- Kampung Sri Arjuna, Kota Padawan
- PR1MA Semenggoh, Kota Padawan
- Kampung Mambong, Kota Padawan
- Kampung Sikog, Kota Padawan
- Kampung Simboh, Kota Padawan
- Kampung Sitaang, Kota Padawan
- Kampung Tabuan Rabak, Kota Padawan
- Kampung Sarig, Padawan
- Kampung Simpok, Padawan
- Kampung Emperoh Jambu, Padawan
- Kampung Bratan, Padawan
- Kampung Punau, Padawan
- Kampung Benuk, Padawan
- Kampung Giam, Padawan
- Kampung Garung, Padawan
- Kampung Semadang, Padawan

Attraction spots in Kota Padawan area :

- Semenggoh Wildlife & Nature Centre, Kota Padawan
- Sarawak Biodiversity Centre, Semenggoh, Kota Padawan
- St. Ann Catholic Church, Kota Padawan
- Rajah Charles Brooke Memorial Hospital, Kota Padawan
- Sikog Waterfall, Siburan (Padawan)
- Segon Be'an Waterfall, Kampung Petag, Siburan (Padawan)
- Rembang Cave (Gua Rembang), Padawan
- Sebarau Waterfall, Padawan
- Simpok Waterfront, Kampung Simpok, Padawan
- Teng Bukap Blue Pool, Teng Bukap, Padawan

=== Kota Sentosa ===
Once dubbed as the busiest town in Padawan municipality area, Kota Sentosa is a commercial business & economy area that is very popular for traders and entrepreneurs to open their business activities. According to Padawan Municipal Council, back in mid 1990s, estimated around 16,000 residents have lived in Kota Sentosa at that time before the development projects begun in Batu Kawah area.

Also inside the Kota Sentosa sub-area, there is five current military base camps. It is because 47% of total population in Kota Sentosa sub-area mostly are military families.

Military base camps :

- Kem Semenggo (Semenggo Camp) (Rejimen Askar Melayu Diraja (RAMD) 11).
- Markas Pangkalan Udara Tentera Udara Diraja Malaysia (TUDM), Kota Sentosa, Kuching.
- Kem Ria (Ria Camp) (BN1/511th Territorial Army Regiment) (Malaysian Armed Forces), Kota Sentosa
- Kem Penrissen Baru (Penrissen Army Camp), Kota Sentosa (Rejimen Renjer Diraja and 4th Armoured Regiment (4 KAD / 4 Armor)) (Malaysian Armed Forces).
- Kem Penrissen Lama (Old Penrissen Camp), Kota Sentosa.

=== Telaga Air ===
Telaga Air is a sub-area that is located in Petra Jaya, Kuching, Sarawak. This sub-area was formerly part of the administrative area under Kuching North City Hall (Dewan Bandaraya Kuching Utara (DBKU)). However the current chairman of Padawan Municipal Council (MPP), Cr. Tan Kai, finally agreed to take over both Telaga Air and Trombol area as the part of Padawan municipality areas.

These are the villages and attraction spots that available inside the Telaga Air sub-area :

Villages :

- Kampung Telaga Air
- Kampung Selang Laut
- Kampung Selang Ulu
- Kampung Temenggong, Telaga Air
- Kampung Jaya Bakti, Telaga Air
- Kampung Sri Kandung, Telaga Air
- Kampung Sungai Atas Baru, Telaga Air
- Kampung Rayu, Telaga Air
- Kampung Sungai Belian, Telaga Air
- Kampung Heritage
- Kampung Matang Lot
- Kampung Matang Batu
- Kampung Nyabut, Trombol
- Kampung Trombol
- Kampung Sibu Laut, Trombol
- Kampung Sungai Aur, Trombol

Attraction spots in Telaga Air & Trombol :

- Matang Wildlife Centre
- Kubah National Park
- Mount Serapi (Gunung Serapi)
- Retreat @ Serapi Matang
- Kuching Wetlands National Park
- Trombol Beach (Pantai Trombol), Trombol
- Mersan Beach (Pantai Mersan), Telaga Air
- Pulau Satang National Park, Pulau Satang (Satang Island), Telaga Air
- Telaga Air Waterfront (Tebingan Telaga Air)

=== Siburan ===
Siburan is a sub-area that located between Padawan District and Serian area. These are rural settlements and urban settlement areas in Siburan sub-area that still administratively under Padawan Municipal Council (MPP) :

- Taman Shun Lee, Kota Padawan
- Taman Eden Fields, Kota Padawan
- Kampung Jawa Semenggok, Kota Padawan
- Rancangan Perumahan Rakyat (RPR) Batu 12, Semenggok, Kota Padawan
- Kampung Sidanu, Siburan
- Taman Inling, Kota Padawan
- Taman Sri Muhibbah, Siburan
- Taman Beverly (Beverly Garden), Siburan
- Kampung Seratau, Siburan
- Kampung Permas, Siburan
- Kampung Kerumboi, Siburan
- Kampung Menjau, Siburan
- Kampung Patung, Siburan
- Kampung Plaman Toop, Siburan
- Kampung Duras, Siburan

== Demographics ==
Total population of every sub-areas in Padawan municipality, Kuching, Sarawak. These population are exactly based on their ethnics in Sarawak.

Chinese, Iban, Malay, and Bidayuh is the only dominant ethnics inside Padawan municipality area.

1. Batu Kawah

- Chinese : 62,873
- Iban : 51,926
- Malay : 30,178
- Bidayuh : 21,815
- Orang Ulu : 2,993
- Indian : 1,075
- Melanau : 95
- Other ethnics : –

TOTAL : 170,955

2. Kota Sentosa & Batu Kitang

- Chinese : 30,887
- Malay : 26,425
- Bidayuh : 4,173
- Iban : 3,879
- Orang Ulu : 731
- Melanau : 140
- Indian : 105
- Other ethnics : –

TOTAL : 66,340

3. Padawan (Kota Padawan, Mambong, & Semadang)

- Bidayuh : 28,133
- Chinese : 15,027
- Malay : 13,861
- Iban : 4,120
- Orang Ulu : 73
- Melanau : –
- Indian : –
- Other ethnics : –

TOTAL : 61,214

4. Siburan (under MPP administrative area)

- Bidayuh : 28,126
- Chinese : 9,380
- Iban : 8,114
- Malay : 5,007
- Melanau : 41
- Orang Ulu : –
- Indian : –
- Other ethnics : –

TOTAL : 50,668

5. Telaga Air & Trombol

- Malay : 32,912
- Iban : 5,831
- Chinese : 5,640
- Melanau : 107
- Bidayuh : 11
- Orang Ulu : –
- Indian : –
- Other ethnics : –

TOTAL : 44,501

== See also ==
- Kuching District
- Kuching
- Padawan
- Batu Kawah
- Padawan Municipal Council
- Bau
- Lundu
- Kota Samarahan
- Serian
