= Tebakang =

Tebakang Daerah kecil Tebakang داءيره كچيل تباکڠ
- Location within Borneo
- Coordinates: 1.1°N 110.5°E
- Country: Malaysia
- State: Sarawak
- Administrative Division: Serian
- Elevation: 76 m (249 ft)

Tebakang (also known as Tebekang or Tabekang) is a village in the Serian division of Sarawak, Malaysia, between Serian and Tebedu. It is about 15 minutes drive from Serian Town. Tebakang lies approximately 56.9 kilometres (35 mi) south-south-east of the state capital Kuching.

The population of Tebakang, over 2000, is predominantly Bidayuh tribespeople and Malays, and the village is divided into two villages by the Sadong River (Sungai Sadong in Malay). The settlement on the main road side is named Kampung Bidayuh Tebakang and on the other side of the Sadong River is Kampung Melayu Tebakang. The school in Tebakang has seven classrooms, seventeen teachers, and caters for 260 students.

During Charles Vyner Brooke's era, Fort Tebakang was built as an administrative centre in 1929.

The Tebakang area has some striking limestone hills with vertical cliffs.

Neighbouring settlements include:

- Kampung Piching 1.9 kilometres (1.2 mi) west
- Kampung Tebakang 1.9 kilometres (1.2 mi) east
- Kampung Pesa 3.7 kilometres (2.3 mi) north
- Kampung Siu 3.7 kilometres (2.3 mi) south
- Kampung Daso 4.1 kilometres (2.5 mi) northeast
- Kampung Kuran 5.6 kilometres (3.5 mi) east
- Kampung Sorah 5.9 kilometres (3.7 mi) east
