= Kampung Mundai =

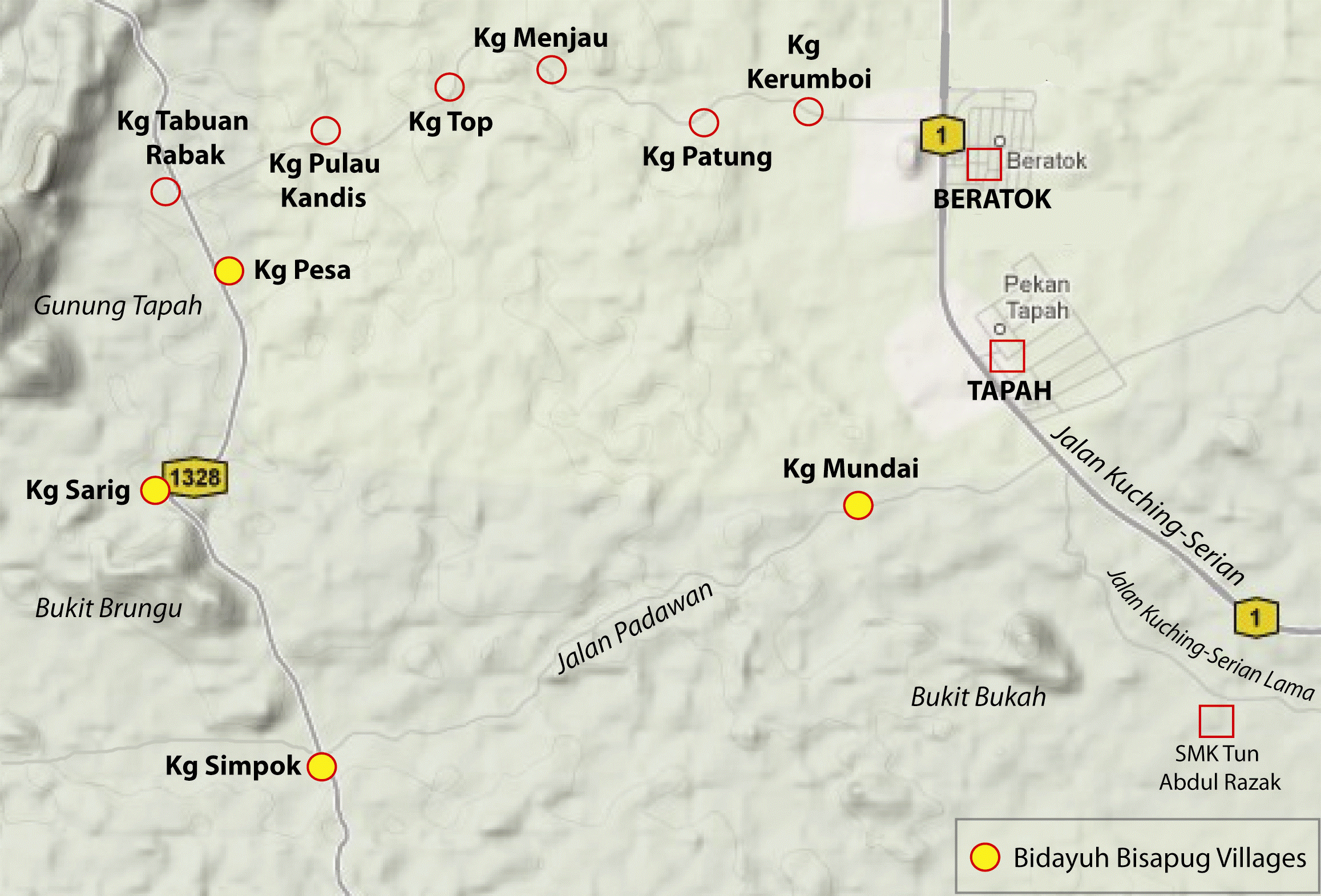
Location of Kampung Mundai and nearby places.

Kampung Mundai (Mundai Village) is one of the Bidayuh community settlement in Padawan area of Sarawak, Malaysia. It is located at Km 2, Jalan Padawan near a small town of Tapah, about 38 km from Kuching city centre. Now it is part of villages under administration of Siburan District in Serian Division. There are about 250 houses in the village.

== History ==
The name of Mundai is originally used after Plaman Munoi. In the past, there was a small group of Bidayuh (Land Dayak) Bisapug community settlement besides the Tapah River. They were farmers and built a hut besides the river. Once upon a time, there was a great traditional longhouse of Bidayuh Bisapug community on the top of Brungu Hill. In the past, around 1900, this community went down and explore new settlements. The earliest of these resulted in a new longhouse at the foot of Brungu Hill named Sarig (now Kampung Sarig). They also explored to the south, along Pluman River, where the Bisapug community built a new longhouse, Pluman (now called Kampung Simpok), a place where Pluman River meets the Serin River. Then, some of this community explored to the east through Tapah River settle at two longhouses namely bitangan (beside Tapah river and another one at another side of it branch Sungai Daoh) and made a new settlement called Kampung Plaman Sidaun with appointment of new village chief. Some of them explored even further to the place called Plaman Munoi. More and more people came and formed the new village called Kampung Mundai. Exactly, the words 'Mundai' may refer to Bidayuh Bisapug's words, Mun and Ndai which mean Going Down and Make or Build. In combination these two words may mean Going down and build a new village.

== Ethnicity ==
Most of its population are the Bidayuhs (95%), and the others are Chinese, Iban and other ethnics.

== Religion ==
Almost all of Mundai residents are Christians. They were divided into two: the Anglicans and the Roman Catholics. There were two churches in the village. The Anglicans attend Christianity faith at the St. Matthew's Church, while the Roman Catholics go to the St. Bonaventure's Church. The former Anglican Chapel was built around 1967, and rebuilt a new church in 1991, while the Catholic Church was built in 1982.

== Education ==
In earlier times on 1950's, a group of Anglican missionaries built St Matthew's Anglican School in the village to offer formal education and teach Christianity. When Sarawak joined the Federation of Malaysia in 1963, the national educational system took over schooling in Sarawak and the Anglican missionary school became known as Sekolah Rendah Bantuan St. Matthew (today as Sekolah Kebangsaan St. Matthew, Mundai). In secondary education, most study at Sekolah Menengah Kebangsaan Tun Abdul Razak, formerly known as Dragon School then Kolej Tun Abdul Razak.

== Language ==
The Bidayuh community living in this village speaks Bisapug (a sub-dialect of Bidayuh or Land Dayak). Other villages speaking the same dialect are Kampung Simpok (Pluman), Kampung Sarig and Kampung Pesa.
