= Kuching Cat Museum =

- Muzium Kucing Kuching
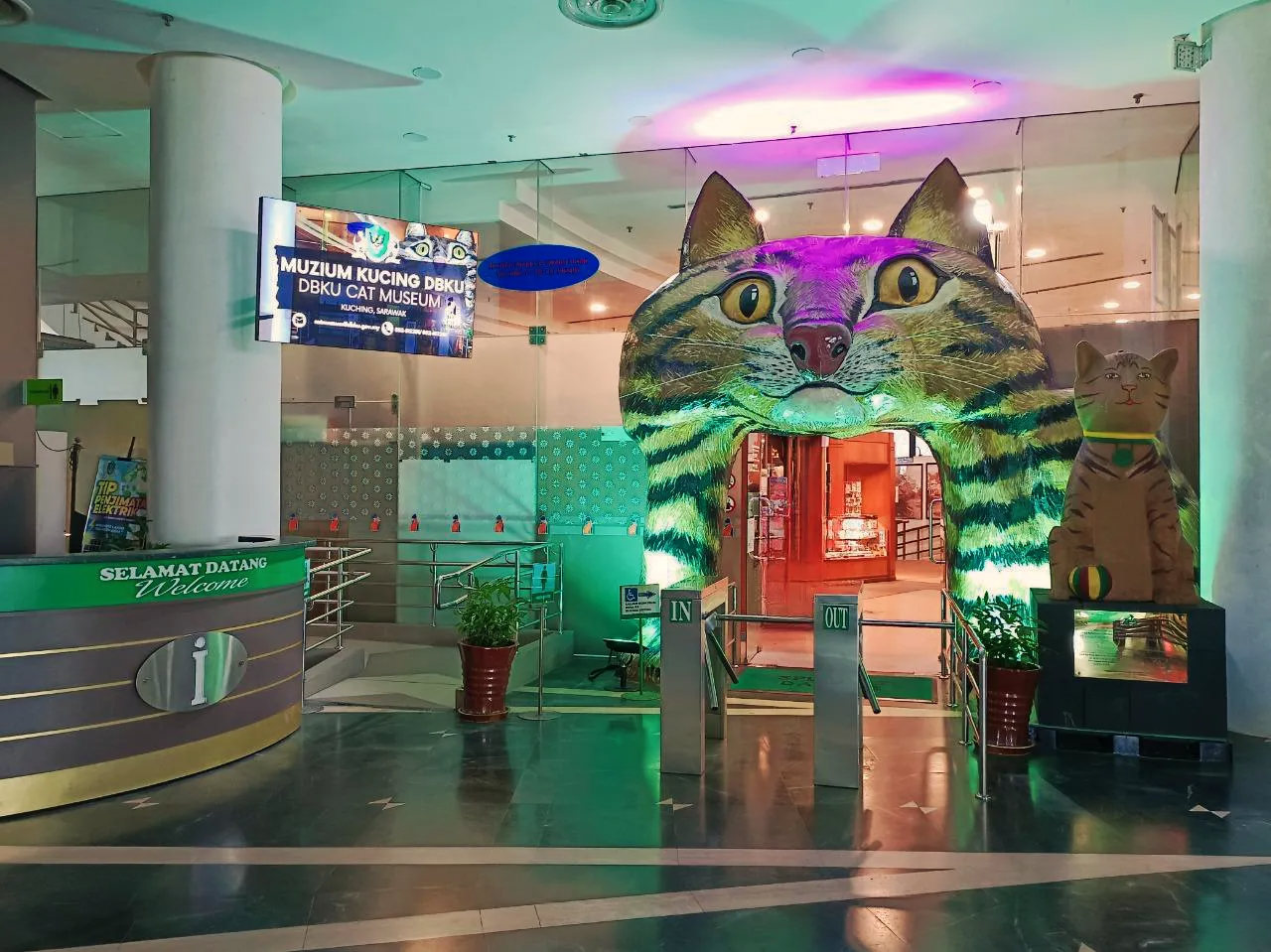
- Main entrance to Kuching Cat Museum in 2024
- Established: 1993
- Location: Kuching, Sarawak, Malaysia
- Coordinates: 1°35′11.8″N 110°20′3.5″E
- Type: museum
- Collection size: 4,000
- Owner: Kuching North City Hall (DBKU)

The Kuching Cat Museum (Malay: Muzium Kucing Kuching) is a cat museum in Kuching, Sarawak, Malaysia. It was founded in 1993 and it is owned by the Kuching North City Hall (DBKU), and housed in their headquarters. "Kuching" (or more specifically 'Kucing') translates to "cat" in Malay. It is the first museum in the world built to showcase entirely on cats.

== History ==
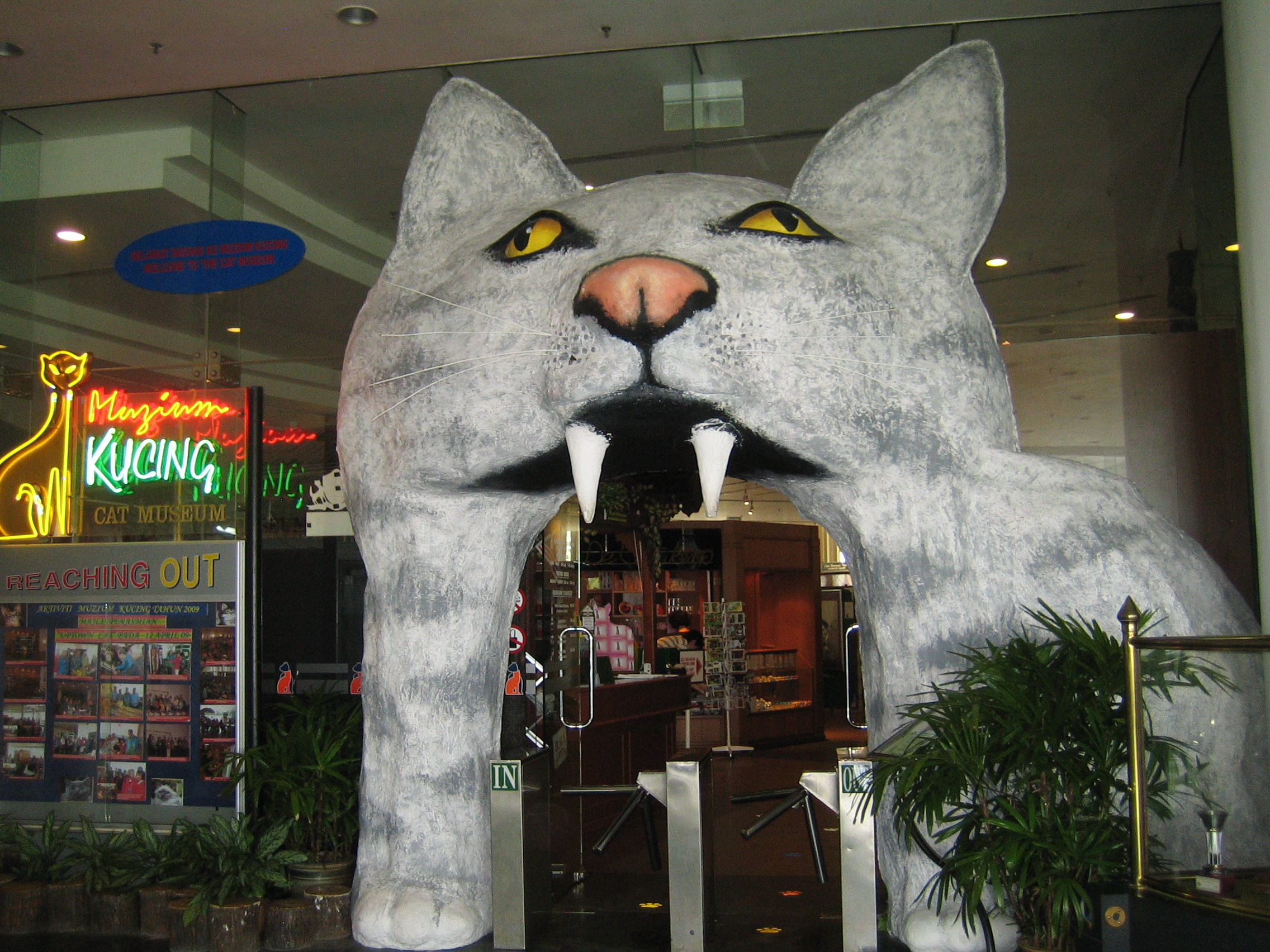
Main entrance to Kuching Cat Museum in 2009

The idea of building a cat museum was raised by Chief Minister of Sarawak Abdul Taib Mahmud and his wife Laila Taib. The artefacts were acquired from National Museum in Kuala Lumpur and were first displayed on 1 August 1988 at Dewan Tun Abdul Razak, Putra World Trade Centre. The collections were given to DBKU after the completion of DBKU headquarters, where the museum is based, in 1992.

The city is also home to a number of cat statues, in honour of the city's name. However, the origin of the city's name is not known.

== Collections ==
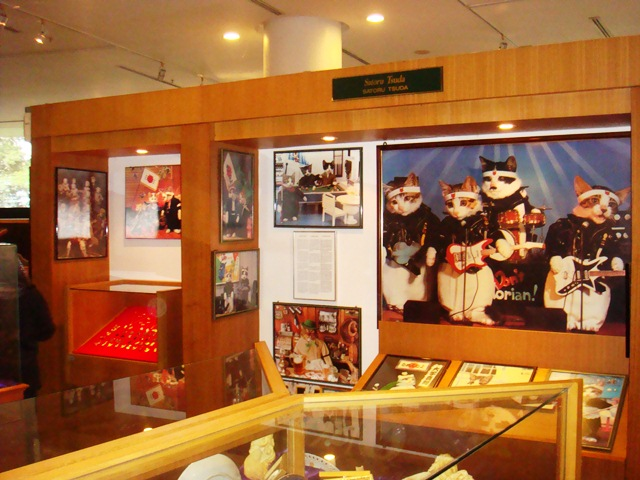
A gallery featuring works by Japanese photographer Satoru Tsuda

There are four galleries containing over 4,000 artefacts including paintings and memorabilia and other items relating to cats. The museum follows the history of cats back around 5000 years, and analyses the influence of cats on our culture and superstitions. Exhibits include a mummified cat from ancient Egypt, a gallery of feline-related advertising, and the five species of wild cats found in Borneo. They claim to possess the only preserved specimen of the world's rarest cat - the Bay cat (Felis badia). There is also a gift shop with a large range of cat themed items.

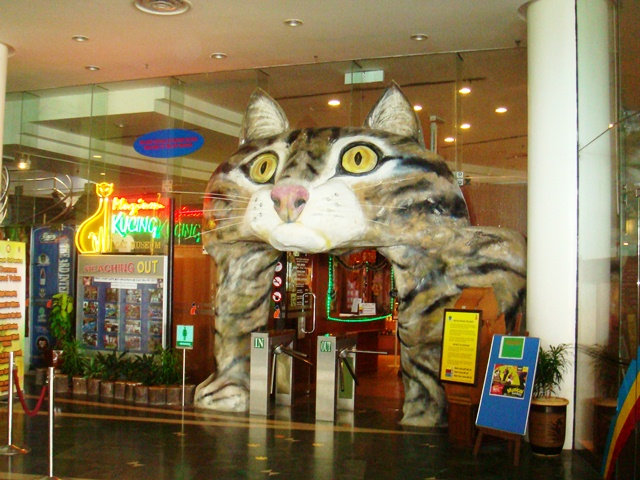
Main entrance to Kuching Cat Museum in 2011.

The museum is currently housed on the bottom floor of the Kuching North City Hall, located in Petra Jaya, on Bukit Siol which is 60 metres above sea level. The museum covers an area of 1,035 square metres and comprising 4 main galleries.

== See also ==
- List of museums in Malaysia
