= Padawan Municipal Council =

Local authority in Malaysia

Padawan Municipal Council Majlis Perbandaran Padawan
- Local Authority Ordinance 1948

Type
- Type: Local authority of the Padawan municipality

History
- Founded: 1 August 1996

Leadership
- Chairman: Tan Kai
- Seats: 40

Motto
- Cekap, Bersih, Makmur (Efficient, Clean, Prosperous)

Meeting place
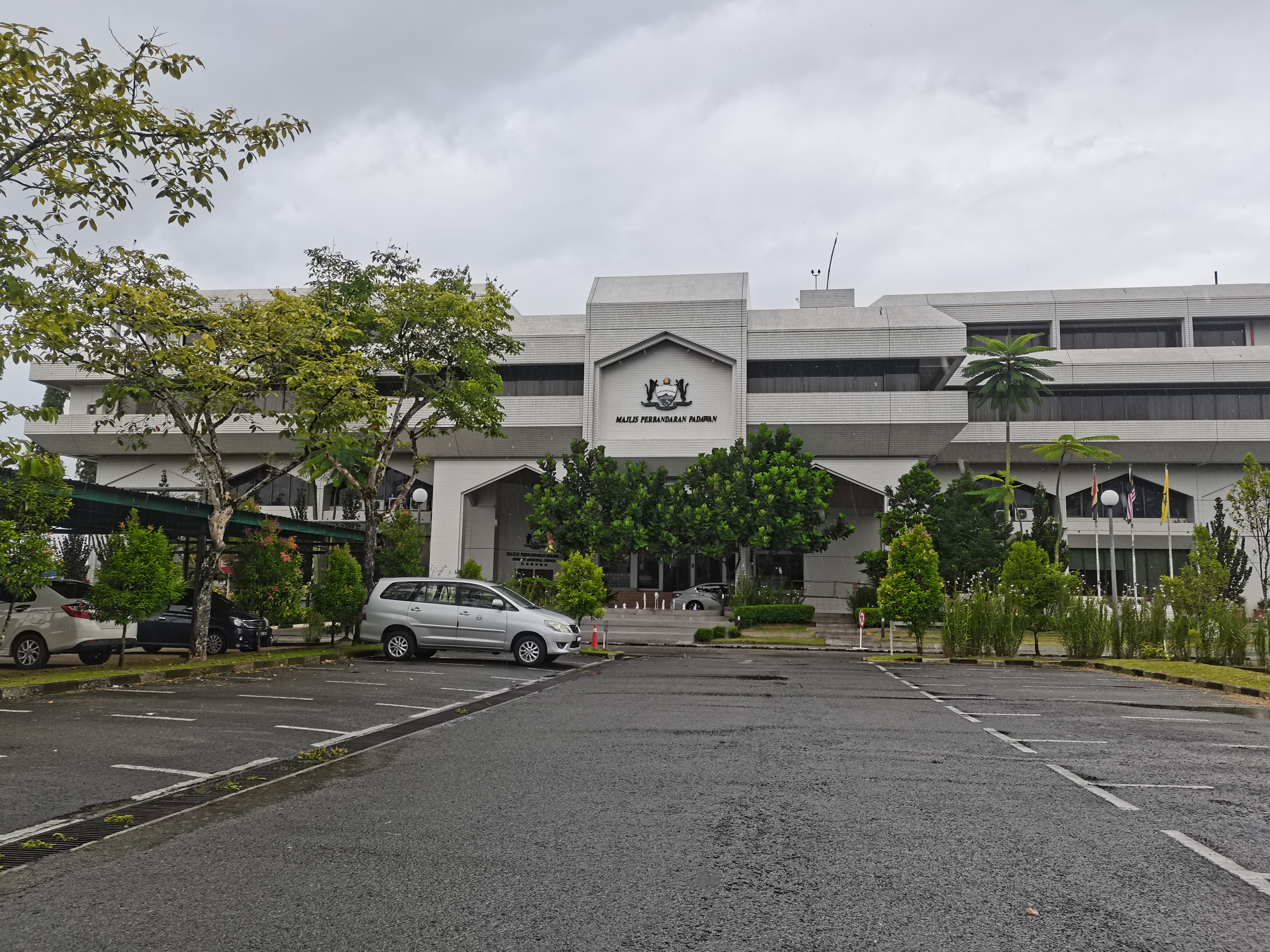
- Kota Padawan, Kuching, Sarawak, Malaysia

Website
- mpp.sarawak.gov.my

Footnotes
- Formerly known as Kuching Rural District Council

Padawan Municipal Council (Malay: Majlis Perbandaran Padawan) (MPP or PMC) is a local authority which administers Padawan municipality of the Kuching District, Sarawak, Malaysia. The agency is under the purview of Sarawak Ministry of Local Government and Community Development. MPP headquarters is located at Kota Padawan, at 10th mile (16 km) away from Kuching city centre. The council aimed to improve infrastructure development and provide quality services to its residents besides preserving the environment.

== History ==
=== Kuching Rural District Council (KRDC) ===
Kuching Rural District Council (KRDC) was formed in 1956 during the colonial era. From 1957 to 1961, the district officer would become the chairman of the council. From 1962 to 1981, elections would be held for a new chairman. However, starting from 1 November 1981, new chairman would be appointed by the Sarawak state government.

=== Padawan Municipal Council (PMC) ===
On 1 August 1996, KRDC was elevated to Padawan Municipal Council, 40 years after the formation of KRDC. Municipal secretary would be chief executive officer and warrant holder of the council.

=== List of sub-areas that fully owned by Padawan Municipal Council (MPP) ===
- Batu Kitang
- Batu Kawah
- Kota Sentosa (6th Mile, 7th Mile, and Penrissen)
- Kota Padawan
- Landeh
- Semenggoh
- Padawan (Bratan, Punau, Semadang, Simboh, Sarig, Simpok, and Teng Bukap)
- Several rural & semi-urban areas in Siburan
- Matang (Moyan, Sungai Tengah, Malihah, and Sejijak)
- Matang Hilir
- Kampung Matang & Kampung Matang Lot
- Kampung Rayu, Matang
- Kampung Heritage, Matang
- Kampung Temenggong, Matang
- Selang Ulu & Selang Laut
- Telaga Air
- Trombol

== Administration ==
Padawan Municipal Council administers an area of 1,432 km^{2} (553 sq mi) which covers mainly the Kuching outskirts with a overall population of 340,226 residents, consists of Chinese and Iban as the majority in this area, followed by Malays, Bidayuh, and fewer Orang Ulu community. The main source of revenue for the council is the assessment tax (a local property tax that based on the annual rental value of the property). A total of RM 40 million assessment tax has been collected as on 30 November 2025.

== Committees ==
The council has six standing committees namely:

- Finance and Establishment Standing Committee
- General Purposes and Community Services Standing Committee
- Public Health, Environmental Protection and Council Services Standing Committee
- Market, Licensing, Hawkers and Petty Traders Standing Committee
- Traffic, Infrastructure Development, Building Plans and Town Planning Standing Committee
- Landscape and Tourism Standing Committee

== See also ==
- Kuching North City Hall (DBKU)
- Kuching South City Council (MBKS)
- Petra Jaya District
- Bau District
- Lundu District
- Serian District
