= Batu Kawah (state constituency) =

State constituency in Sarawak, Malaysia

Batu Kawah (N14)
Sarawak constituency

State constituency
- Legislature: Sarawak State Legislative Assembly
MLA
Vacant
- Constituency created: 1968
- First contested: 1969
- Last contested: 2026

Batu Kawah is a state constituency in Sarawak, Malaysia, that has been represented in the Sarawak State Legislative Assembly since 1969.

The state constituency was created in the 1968 redistribution and is mandated to return a single member to the Sarawak State Legislative Assembly under the first past the post voting system.

== Demographics ==
Ethnic breakdown of Batu Kawah's electorate as of 2022
1. Chinese (55.6%)
2. Sarawak bumiputera (26.4%)
3. Malay-Muslim bumiputera (16.2%)
4. Other ethnicities (1.80%)

== History ==
As of 2026, Batu Kawah has a population of 170,955 people.

=== Polling districts ===
According to the gazette issued on 31 October 2022, the Batu Kawah constituency has a total of 5 polling districts.

State constituency	Polling Districts	Code	Location
Batu Kawah (N14)	RPR Batu Kawah	196/14/01	SK RPR Batu Kawah
Batu Kawah (N14)	Kawah	196/14/02	SJK (C) Chung Hua Batu Kawa
Batu Kawah (N14)	Stapok	196/14/03	SK Rantau Panjang; SJK (C) Chung Hua Stapok; SMK Batu Kawa; SJK (C) Chung Hua Sg Tapang; Balai Raya Kpg Desa Wira Lot; SK Jalan Arang; SK Stapok; Dewan Serbaguna Kpg Sinar Budi
Batu Kawah (N14)	Sin San Tu	196/14/04	SJK (C) Chung Hua Sin San Tu
Batu Kawah (N14)	Kim Chu Shin	196/14/05	SJK (C) Chung Hua Kim Choo Seng

=== Representation history ===
Members of the Legislative Assembly for Batu Kawah
Assembly	No	Years	Member	Party
Constituency created
8th	N09	1970-1973	Chong Kiun Kong (張君光)	SUPP
8th	N09	1973-1974	Chong Kiun Kong (張君光)	BN (SUPP)
9th	N09	1974-1979	Chong Kiun Kong (張君光)	BN (SUPP)
10th	N09	1979-1983	Chong Kiun Kong (張君光)	BN (SUPP)
11th	N09	1983-1987	Chong Kiun Kong (張君光)	BN (SUPP)
12th	N09	1987-1991	Chong Kiun Kong (張君光)	BN (SUPP)
13th	N10	1991-1992	Chong Kiun Kong (張君光)	BN (SUPP)
13th	N10	1992-1996	Yap Chin Loi (葉金來)	BN (SUPP)
14th	N11	1996-2001	Yap Chin Loi (葉金來)	BN (SUPP)
15th	N11	2001-2006	Yap Chin Loi (葉金來)	BN (SUPP)
16th	N13	2006-2011	Tan Joo Phoi (陳如飛)	BN (SUPP)
17th	N13	2011-2016	Christina Chiew Wang See (周婉詩)	PR (DAP)
18th	N14	2016-2018	Sim Kui Hian (沈桂賢)	BN (SUPP)
18th	N14	2018-2021	Sim Kui Hian (沈桂賢)	GPS (SUPP)
19th	N14	2021–2026	Sim Kui Hian (沈桂賢)	GPS (SUPP)

== Election results ==
Sarawak state election, 2026
Party	Candidate	Votes	%	∆%
GPS	Sim Kui Hian			▲
DAP	Sim Kiat Leng			▲
Total valid votes				
Total rejected ballots				
Unreturned ballots				
Turnout				
Registered electors				
Majority				

Sarawak state election, 2021
Party	Candidate	Votes	%	∆%
GPS	Sim Kui Hian	7,827	70.20	▲70.20
DAP	Kelvin Yii Lee Wuen	2,434	21.83	▼14.70
PBK	Chai Kueh Khun	756	6.78	▲6.78
ASPIRASI	Fong Pau Teck	133	1.19	▲1.19
Total valid votes		11,150	100.00	
Total rejected ballots		102		
Unreturned ballots		45		
Turnout		11,297	54.63	▼16.24
Registered electors		20,681		
Majority		5,393	48.37	▲30.78
GPS gain from BN		Swing		?
Source(s) https://lom.agc.gov.my/ilims/upload/portal/akta/outputp/1718688/PUB687.pdf

Sarawak state election, 2016
Party	Candidate	Votes	%	∆%
BN	Sim Kui Hian	6,414	54.12	▲6.01
DAP	Christina Chiew Wang See	4,329	36.53	▼15.36
Independent	Liu Thian Leong	1,109	9.35	▲9.35
Total valid votes		11,852	100.00	
Total rejected ballots		135		
Unreturned ballots		55		
Turnout		12,042	70.87	▲0.19
Registered electors		16,991		
Majority		2,085	17.59	▲13.80
BN gain from DAP		Swing		?
Source(s) "Federal Government Gazette - Notice of Contested Election, State Legislative Assembly of the State of Sarawak [P.U. (B) 190/2016]" (PDF). Attorney General's Chambers of Malaysia. 25 April 2016. Archived from the original (PDF) on 12 June 2017. "Senarai Calon yang Disahkan Layak Bertanding Pilihan Raya Dewan Undangan Negeri ke-11". Election Commission of Malaysia. 25 April 2016. Archived from the original on 25 April 2016.

Sarawak state election, 2011
Party	Candidate	Votes	%	∆%
DAP	Christina Chiew Wang See	7,439	51.89	▲51.89
BN	Tan Joo Phoi	6,896	48.11	▼24.29
Total valid votes		14,335	100.00	
Total rejected ballots		184		
Unreturned ballots		87		
Turnout		14,606	70.68	▲10.26
Registered electors		20,664		
Majority		543	3.79	▼41.01
DAP gain from BN		Swing		?
Source(s) "Federal Government Gazette - Results of Contested Election and Statements of the Poll after the Official Addition of Votes Sarawak [P.U. (B) 245/2011]" (PDF). Attorney General's Chambers of Malaysia. 29 April 2011.

Sarawak state election, 2006
Party	Candidate	Votes	%	∆%
BN	Tan Joo Phoi	6,755	72.40	▲72.40
PKR	Wong Huan Yu	2,575	27.60	▲27.60
Total valid votes		9,330	100.00	
Total rejected ballots		221		
Unreturned ballots		260		
Turnout		9,811	60.42	
Registered electors		16,237		
Majority		4,180	44.80	
BN hold		Swing		

Sarawak state election, 2001
Party	Candidate	Votes	%	∆%
On the nomination day, Yap Chin Loi won uncontested.
BN	Yap Chin Loi			
Total valid votes			100.00	
Total rejected ballots				
Unreturned ballots				
Turnout				
Registered electors		28,470		
Majority				
BN hold		Swing		

Sarawak state election, 1996
Party	Candidate	Votes	%	∆%
BN	Yap Chin Loi	10,883	84.10	▲10.64
Independent	Dripin Sakoi	2,058	15.90	▼9.92
Total valid votes		12,941	100.00	
Total rejected ballots		240		
Unreturned ballots		290		
Turnout		13,471	61.19	▼7.86
Registered electors		22,016		
Majority		8,825	68.19	▲20.31
BN hold		Swing		

Sarawak state by-election, 22 August 1992 Upon the death of incumbent, Chong Kiun Kong
Party	Candidate	Votes	%	∆%
On the nomination day, Yap Chin Loi won uncontested.
BN	Yap Chin Loi			
Total valid votes			100.00	
Total rejected ballots				
Unreturned ballots				
Turnout				
Registered electors				
Majority				
BN hold		Swing		

Sarawak state election, 1991
Party	Candidate	Votes	%	∆%
BN	Chong Kiun Kong	10,201	73.46	▲8.55
DAP	Yong Sen Chan	3,585	25.82	▲9.72
Independent	Chong Ju Siaw	100	0.72	▲0.72
Total valid votes		13,886	100.00	
Total rejected ballots		235		
Unreturned ballots		159		
Turnout		14,280	69.05	▼4.34
Registered electors		20,682		
Majority		6,616	47.64	▲1.73
BN hold		Swing		

Sarawak state election, 1987
Party	Candidate	Votes	%	∆%
BN	Chong Kiun Kong	8,228	64.91	▼10.69
PERMAS	Japat Simol	2,407	18.99	▲18.99
DAP	Lim Guan Sin	2,041	16.10	▲1.86
Total valid votes		12,676	100.00	
Total rejected ballots		134		
Unreturned ballots		0		
Turnout		12,810	73.39	▲2.79
Registered electors		17,455		
Majority		5,821	45.91	▼15.20
BN hold		Swing		

Sarawak state election, 1983
Party	Candidate	Votes	%	∆%
BN	Chong Kiun Kong	7,517	75.60	▼2.30
Independent	Peter Nuab	1,441	14.49	▼7.62
Independent	Anga Soret	984	9.90	▲9.90
Total valid votes		9,942	100.00	
Total rejected ballots		302		
Unreturned ballots		0		
Turnout		10,244	70.55	▼3.48
Registered electors		14,520		
Majority		6,076	61.11	▲5.32
BN hold		Swing		

Sarawak state election, 1979
Party	Candidate	Votes	%	∆%
BN	Chong Kiun Kong	7,208	77.89	▲18.50
Independent	Anga Soret	2,046	22.11	▲22.11
Total valid votes		9,254	100.00	
Total rejected ballots		298		
Unreturned ballots		0		
Turnout		9,552	74.29	▼6.81
Registered electors		12,858		
Majority		5,162	55.78	▲34.97
BN hold		Swing		

Sarawak state election, 1974
Party	Candidate	Votes	%	∆%
BN	Chong Kiun Kong	4,287	59.39	▲5.32
SNAP	Chin Poh Luke	2,784	38.57	▲14.77
Parti Bisamah Sarawak	Augustine Sirau	147	2.04	▲2.04
Total valid votes		7,218	100.00	
Total rejected ballots		656		
Unreturned ballots		0		
Turnout		7,874	80.84	▼2.69
Registered electors		9,740		
Majority		1,503	20.82	▼9.45
BN gain from SUPP		Swing		?

Sarawak state election, 1969
Party	Candidate	Votes	%
SUPP	Chong Kiun Kong	3,748	54.07
SNAP	Kong Yu Siung	1,650	23.80
SCA	Shii Dai Seng	1,534	22.13
Total valid votes		6,932	100.00
Total rejected ballots		512	
Unreturned ballots		0	
Turnout		7,444	83.53
Registered electors		8,912	
Majority		2,098	30.27
This was a new constituency created.

== Notes ==
- "Keputusan Pilihan Raya Suruhanjaya Pilihan Raya". Election Commission of Malaysia. Archived from the original on 2016-04-24.
