= Batu Gong =

- Location within Borneo
- Coordinates: 1.36667°N 110.43333°E
- Country: Malaysia
- State: Sarawak
- Elevation: 41 m (135 ft)

Batu Gong is a settlement in Sarawak, Malaysia. It lies approximately 26.6 kilometres (16.5 mi) south-south-east of the state capital Kuching. Neighbouring settlements include:

- Kampung Endap 1.9 kilometres (1.2 mi) north
- Kampung Kangka 1.9 kilometres (1.2 mi) north
- Kampung Beradau 2.6 kilometres (1.6 mi) northwest
- Siburan 3.7 kilometres (2.3 mi) west
