= Kuching Division =

Administrative division of Sarawak, Malaysia

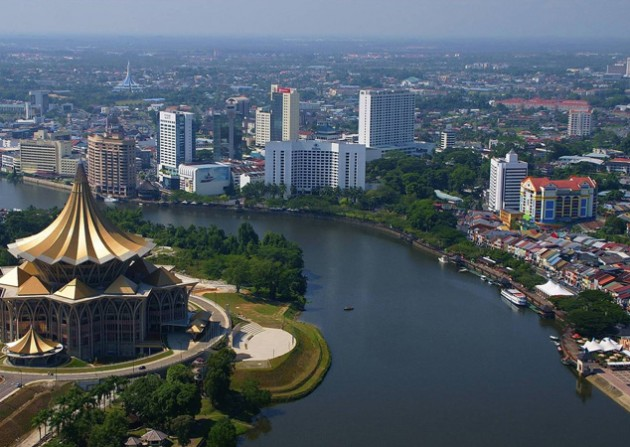
- Kuching is the main city in Kuching Division

- Divisions of Sarawak

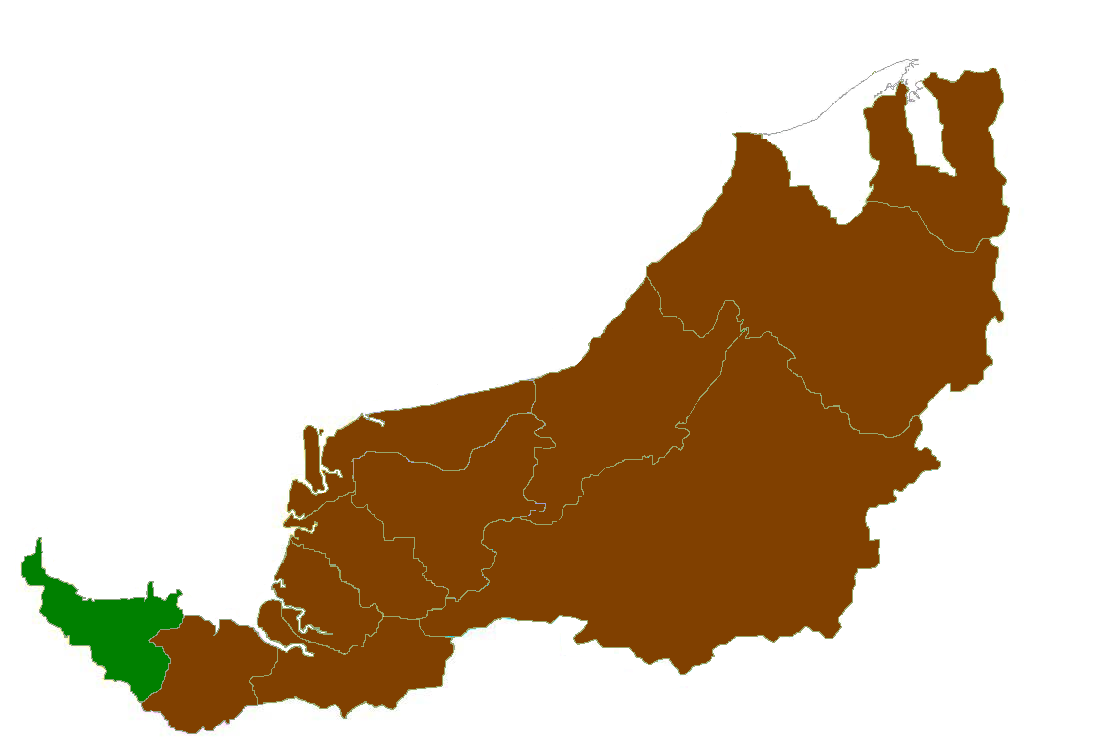
- Division Office location: Kuching
- Local area government(s): Kuching South City Council (MBKS); Kuching North City Hall (DBKU); Padawan Municipal Council (MPP); Bau District Council (MDB); Lundu District Council (MDL)

Area
  - Total: 4,559.5 km^{2} (1,760.4 sq mi)

Population (2024)
  - Total: 697,589
  - Density: 153.00/km^{2} (396.26/sq mi)
- Resident: Norleha binti Hj. Shariff
- License plate prefix: QK, QA
- Ethnicity: Chinese (22.9%), Malay (33.9%), Bidayuh (17.8%), Others (14.9%)

Kuching Division (Malay: Bahagian Kuching) is one of the twelve administrative divisions in Sarawak, Malaysia. Formerly part of what was called the "First Division", it is the center and the starting point of modern Sarawak. Kuching Division has a total area of 4,559.5 km^{2} (1,760.4 sq mi).

Kuching Division consists of three administrative districts:

- Kuching
- Bau
- Lundu

There are also two subdistricts in Kuching Division:

- Padawan
- Sematan

== Demographics ==
The population of Kuching Division (based on 2023 recent census) was 697,589. This makes Kuching Division is the most populated division in Sarawak. Most of the residents in Kuching Division live in Kuching District and Padawan.

=== Ethnics ===
Kuching Division is a melting pot of Sarawak diverse multi-racial society. Despite that, the ethnic composition of Kuching Division is totally different unlike the other parts of whole Sarawak. The majority ethnic groups in Kuching are predominantly consists of both Malay/Muslim and Chinese, while in the whole Sarawak, mostly dominated by the Dayaks (mainly Ibans), with significant Chinese minorities. Basically, it is traditionally a home to Malay, Chinese and Bidayuh people. Most Sarawakian Malay/Muslims are predominantly originated from Kuching Division. They are scattered almost all throughout Kuching Division, with exception of rural areas of Padawan sub-district. Kuching Division is one of the only division that has the highest number of local Malay/Muslims among all divisions in Sarawak. Most Chinese are of Hakka and Hokkien descent while some are Foochow and Teochew. They live mostly at urban and suburban areas. Kuching Division is also a home to the largest Bidayuh community. Like Sarawakian Malay/Muslims, most Sarawakian Bidayuhs are from Kuching Division. They form a majority group in Bau district of Kuching. Other significant minority in Kuching Division are Iban and Melanau. Most of them originated outside Kuching. However, the earliest Iban settlement in Kuching can be found at Kampung Siol Kandis, Petra Jaya, Kuching. Most Melanau people who reside in Kuching have assimilated into Malay society due to professing Islam. Some of them have no longer speak in Melanau language in results to the assimilation. Kuching people also mainly speak Sarawak Malay (Bahasa Melayu Sarawak) which is similar to the Malaysia's official language of Bahasa Malaysia.

Kuching Division Ethnic Statistic
Administrative District	Total Population	Malay	Iban	Bidayuh	Melanau	Other Bumiputera	Chinese	Other Non-Bumiputera	Non-Citizen
Kuching	617,887 (87.6%)	220,333 (35.7%)	67,367 (10.9%)	76,403 (12.4%)	3,932 (0.6%)	8,473 (1.4%)	225,998 (36.6%)	5,295 (0.8%)	10,050 (1.6%)
Bau	54,046 (7.7%)	4,187 (7.6%)	1,402 (2.6%)	37,328 (69.0%)	91 (0.2%)	380 (0.7%)	9,443 (17.4%)	221 (0.4%)	1,194 (2.1%)
Lundu	33,413 (4.7%)	11,467 (34.3%)	4,438 (13.3%)	12,034 (36.0%)	81 (0.2%)	228 (0.7%)	3,650 (10.9%)	135 (0.4%)	1,380 (4.1%)
Total Kuching Division	705,546 (100.0%)	235,987 (33.4%)	73,207 (10.4%)	125,765 (17.8%)	4,104 (0.6%)	9,081 (1.3%)	239,091 (33.9%)	5,687 (0.8%)	12,624 (1.8%)

== Economy ==
Kuching Division is a home to Sarawak capital city, Kuching. It is a centre of business, commercial, mixed industries, service sectors, education hub and tourism centre for Sarawak. Kuching relies heavily on its productive population to run its economy, rather than exploiting its natural resources.

== Government ==
=== Administration ===
Administrative districts of Kuching Division.

Administrative Subdivisions of Kuching Division (by area)
Name of Division Division area	Kuching; 4,565.53 km^{2}							
Name of District District area	Kuching; 1,868.83 km^{2}					Bau; 884.4 km^{2}	Lundu; 1,812.3 km^{2}	
Name of Subdistrict Subdistrict area	Kuching Proper; 895.09 km^{2}			Siburan (Note: Siburan is no longer a part of Kuching Division following the establishment of Serian Division); 447.55 km^{2}	Padawan; 526.19 km^{2}		Lundu; 1,369.84 km^{2}	Sematan; 442.5 km^{2}
Seat of District/Subdistrict administration Settlement hierarchy	Kuching; City			Siburan; Bazaar	Teng Bukap; Village	Bau; Bazaar	Lundu; Bazaar	Sematan; Bazaar
Local Government Note: Acronym and part of corporate colours	MBKS	DBKU	MPP	MD Serian	MPP	MDB	MDL	
Local Government Name (Legal term in English) Title of CEO	Council of the City of Kuching South; Mayor	Commission of the City of Kuching North; Commissioner	Padawan; Municipal Council; Chairman			Bau; District Council; Chairman	Lundu; District Council; Chairman	
Local Government area	61.53 km^{2}	369.48 km^{2}	1,431.82 km^{2} Note: This area is known collectively as the Padawan municipality			884.4 km^{2}	1,812.3 km^{2}	
Seat of Local Government Settlement hierarchy	Kuching; City		Kota Padawan; Bazaar			Bau; Bazaar	Lundu; Bazaar	

=== Members of Parliament ===
Parliament	Member of Parliament	Party
P192 Mas Gading	YB Tuan Mordi Bimol	PH (DAP)
P193 Santubong	YB Dato’ Sri Nancy Shukri	GPS (PBB)
P194 Petra Jaya	YAB Dato' Sri Fadillah Yusof	GPS (PBB)
P195 Bandar Kuching	YB Tuan Kelvin Yii Lee Wuen	PH (DAP)
P196 Stampin	YB Tuan Chong Chieng Jen	PH (DAP)
P198 Puncak Borneo	YB Datuk Willie Mongin	GPS (PBB)

== Transportation ==
Kuching Division is a centre of transportation sectors in Sarawak, with exception of river transportation. It has wide range of transportation services such as by air (via Kuching International Airport), land (via its vast road networks) and river.

More article at Kuching Transportation.

== Infrastructure ==
Kuching Division has the widest and most extensive road networks in Sarawak. Pan-Borneo Highway is a trunk road linking Kuching to the rest of divisions in Sarawak. Kuching Division is also a home to world-class convention centre, named Borneo Convention Centre Kuching (BCCK).

=== Sports and games ===
Kuching Division is home to the oldest golf course in Sarawak, which is Sarawak Golf Club. There are also various other golf clubs throughout Kuching Division. Sports amenities can be found at many parts in Kuching with Stadium Sarawak being the largest stadium in Sarawak while Stadium Perpaduan being the largest indoor stadium in Sarawak. Variety of sports and games can be observed being played in Sarawak. Most of them are state-level games and competitions.

=== Education ===
Kuching Division offers wide variety of education regardless of level of education. There are countless public schools, including privileged school such as Sekolah Menengah Teknik (two of them), Sekolah Menengah Agama (three of them), Sekolah Menengah Sains and Maktab Rendah Sains MARA. Kuching Division also has two private international schools, namely Lodge School and Tunku Putra International School.

Kuching Division is also a higher education heaven. It has a lot of training institutions from medical schools, teacher training colleges, custom academy and the upcoming immigration academy. There are few private higher institution such as Swinburne University, Sunway College, SEGi College Sarawak, Masterskill College and ICATS . It is also within a reach to Universiti Malaysia Sarawak (UNIMAS) and Universiti Teknologi MARA, both in Samarahan.

=== Healthcare ===
Kuching Division is also a popular destination for seeking better healthcare. People around Sarawak normally seek better medical treatment in Kuching Division due to its extensive medical facilities. It houses the biggest public hospital in East Malaysia, named Sarawak General Hospital and also one of only two heart surgery institution in Malaysia named Pusat Jantung HUS.

Private hospital does also make presence in Kuching such as Normah Hospital, located at Petra Jaya, Kuching, Timberland Medical Centre (situated in 3rd Mile area, Kuching), Kuching Specialist Centre (at Tabuan Laru, Kuching) and Borneo Medical Center (at Jalan Simpang Tiga, Kuching). Many private clinics open their business in Kuching making Kuching a perfect medical tourism hub.

Public healthcare clinics and policlinic does also exist in Kuching Division. Most healthcare clinics are located at Kuching city outskirts and rural communal areas.

=== Security ===
Kuching Division is a state headquarters for police and army in Sarawak. Various police stations and police beats can be found all over Kuching District. Military base of Penrissen houses the largest military base in Sarawak.

=== Government services ===
Kuching Division is the headquarters for many government agencies. For federal government agencies headquarters, most of them are located at Simpang Tiga (Bangunan Sultan Iskandar), Kuching while state government agencies headquarters are mostly scattered at various buildings in Petra Jaya, Kuching (Wisma Bapa Malaysia).

== See also ==
- Sarawak
- Kuching District
