= Padawan, Sarawak =

Padawan Sub-district in Kuching District

Padawan is a sub-district of Kuching District, Sarawak, Malaysia. The name is also used to refer to the local government in Sarawak, the Padawan Municipal Council (Majlis Perbandaran Padawan), and to Bidayuh Village, which is also known as Kampung Padawan. The Jalan Padawan is the name of a road near mile 23 of the Kuching–Serian Highway.

== Sub areas in Padawan ==
Division	District	Subdistrict	Sub area
Kuching Division	Kuching District	Padawan	Batu Kawah
Kuching Division	Kuching District	Padawan	Moyan
Kuching Division	Kuching District	Padawan	Kota Sentosa
Kuching Division	Kuching District	Padawan	Kota Padawan
Kuching Division	Kuching District	Padawan	Siburan
Kuching Division	Kuching District	Padawan	Telaga Air
Kuching Division	Kuching District	Padawan	Trombol

== Transportation ==
Padawan is connected via the Kuching–Serian Highway, while 10th mile junction has its own Borneo Heights Link, uptown towards Borneo Highlands Resort. Air transportation can be reached by Kuching International Airport, about 6.4 km (4 mi) from Kota Padawan (10th mile), hotspot area. Most land transports are taxis, buses, mini vans (known locally as 'Van Sapu') which are popular in the region.

== See also ==
- Kampung Mundai
- Kampung Sadir
