= Kampung Beradau =

- Location within Borneo
- Coordinates: 1.38333°N 110.41667°E
- Country: Malaysia
- State: Sarawak
- Elevation: 33 m (108 ft)

Kampung Beradau is a settlement in Sarawak, Malaysia. It lies approximately 24.1 kilometres (15.0 mi) south-south-east of the state capital Kuching. Neighbouring settlements include:

- Kampung Endap 1.9 kilometres (1.2 mi) east
- Kampung Kangka 1.9 kilometres (1.2 mi) east
- Batu Gong 2.6 kilometres (1.6 mi) southeast
- Siburan 2.6 kilometres (1.6 mi) southwest
- Kampung Batu Gong 4.1 kilometres (2.5 mi) southeast
