= Kampung Duuh =

- Location within Borneo
- Coordinates: 1.35°N 110.4°E
- Country: Malaysia
- State: Sarawak
- Elevation: 71 m (233 ft)

Kampung Duuh is a settlement in Sarawak, Malaysia. It lies approximately 27 kilometres (16.8 mi) south-south-east of the state capital Kuching. Neighbouring settlements include:

- Siburan 1.9 kilometres (1.2 mi) north
- Nineteenth Mile Bazaar 1.9 kilometres (1.2 mi) south
- Kampung Tijirak 1.9 kilometres (1.2 mi) south
