= Batu Kitang =

State constituency in Sarawak, Malaysia

Batu Kitang (N13)
Sarawak constituency

State constituency
- Legislature: Sarawak State Legislative Assembly
MLA
Vacant
- Constituency created: 2015
- First contested: 2016
- Last contested: 2026

Batu Kitang is a state constituency in Sarawak, Malaysia, that has been represented in the Sarawak State Legislative Assembly since 2016.

The state constituency was created in the 2015 redistribution and is mandated to return a single member to the Sarawak State Legislative Assembly under the first past the post voting system.

== Demographics ==
Ethnic breakdown of Batu Kitang's electorate as of 2022
1. Chinese (53.0%)
2. Sarawak bumiputera (24.9%)
3. Malay-Muslim bumiputera (21.1%)
4. Other ethnicities (1.00%)

== History ==
As of 2020, Batu Kitang has a population of 59,031 people.

=== Polling districts ===
According to the gazette issued on 31 October 2022, the Batu Kitang constituency has a total of 13 polling districts.

State constituency	Polling Districts	Code	Location
Batu Kitang (N13)	Arang	196/13/01	SMK Arang
Batu Kitang (N13)	Pasar Maong	192/13/02	SK Garland
Batu Kitang (N13)	Haji Baki	196/13/03	SJK (C) Chung Hua Pangkalan Baru; SK Sacred Heart Semeba; Dewan Serbaguna Kpg. Tematu; SK Jln. Haji Baki
Batu Kitang (N13)	Kitang	196/13/04	SJK (C) Chung Hua Batu 8 ½ Batu Kitang; SJK (C) Chung Hua Batu Kitang; SK St. David Bumbok; SJK (C) Chung Hua Batu 10 Jln. Penrissen; SK Kpg. Landeh; RCBM Recreational Centre Batu 13
Batu Kitang (N13)	Lidah Tanah	196/13/05	Balai Raya Lidah Tanah

=== Representation history ===
Members of the Legislative Assembly for Batu Kitang
Assembly	No	Years	Member	Party
Constituency created from Batu Kawah, Kota Sentosa and Muara Tuang
18th	N13	2016-2018	Lo Khere Chiang (羅克強)	BN (SUPP)
18th	N13	2018–2021	Lo Khere Chiang (羅克強)	GPS (SUPP)
19th	N13	2021–2026	Lo Khere Chiang (羅克強)	GPS (SUPP)

== Election results ==
Sarawak state election, 2026: Batu Kitang
Party	Candidate	Votes	%	∆%
GPS				▲
DAP	Jordan Soo Tian Ren			▲
Total valid votes				
Total rejected ballots				
Unreturned ballots				
Turnout				
Registered electors				
Majority				

Sarawak state election, 2021: Batu Kitang
Party	Candidate	Votes	%	∆%
GPS	Lo Khere Chiang	6,307	57.66	▲57.66
DAP	Abdul Aziz Isa Marindo	2,144	19.60	▼18.66
PSB	Liu Thian Leong	1,812	16.57	▲16.57
PBK	Wong Tun Teck	675	6.17	▲6.17
Total valid votes		10,938	100.00	
Total rejected ballots		107		
Unreturned ballots		51		
Turnout		11,096	53.29	▼16.77
Registered electors		20,820		
Majority		4,163	38.06	▲22.84
GPS gain from BN		Swing		?
Source(s) https://lom.agc.gov.my/ilims/upload/portal/akta/outputp/1718688/PUB687.pdf

Sarawak state election, 2016: Batu Kitang
Party	Candidate	Votes	%
BN	Lo Khere Chiang	6,466	53.48
DAP	Abdul Aziz Isa Marindo	4,626	38.26
PKR	Voon Shiak Ni	883	7.30
Independent	Sulaiman Kadir	61	0.50
Independent	Othman Bojeng	54	0.45
Total valid votes		12,090	100.00
Total rejected ballots		135	
Unreturned ballots		31	
Turnout		12,256	70.06
Registered electors		17,494	
Majority		1,840	15.22
This was a new constituency created.
Source(s) "Federal Government Gazette - Notice of Contested Election, State Legislative Assembly of the State of Sarawak [P.U. (B) 190/2016]" (PDF). Attorney General's Chambers of Malaysia. 25 April 2016. Archived from the original (PDF) on 12 June 2017. "Senarai Calon yang Disahkan Layak Bertanding Pilihan Raya Dewan Undangan Negeri ke-11". Election Commission of Malaysia. 25 April 2016. Archived from the original on 25 April 2016.
