= Kuching North City Hall =

City council in Malaysia

Commission of Kuching North City Hall
- Suruhanjaya Dewan Bandaraya Kuching Utara

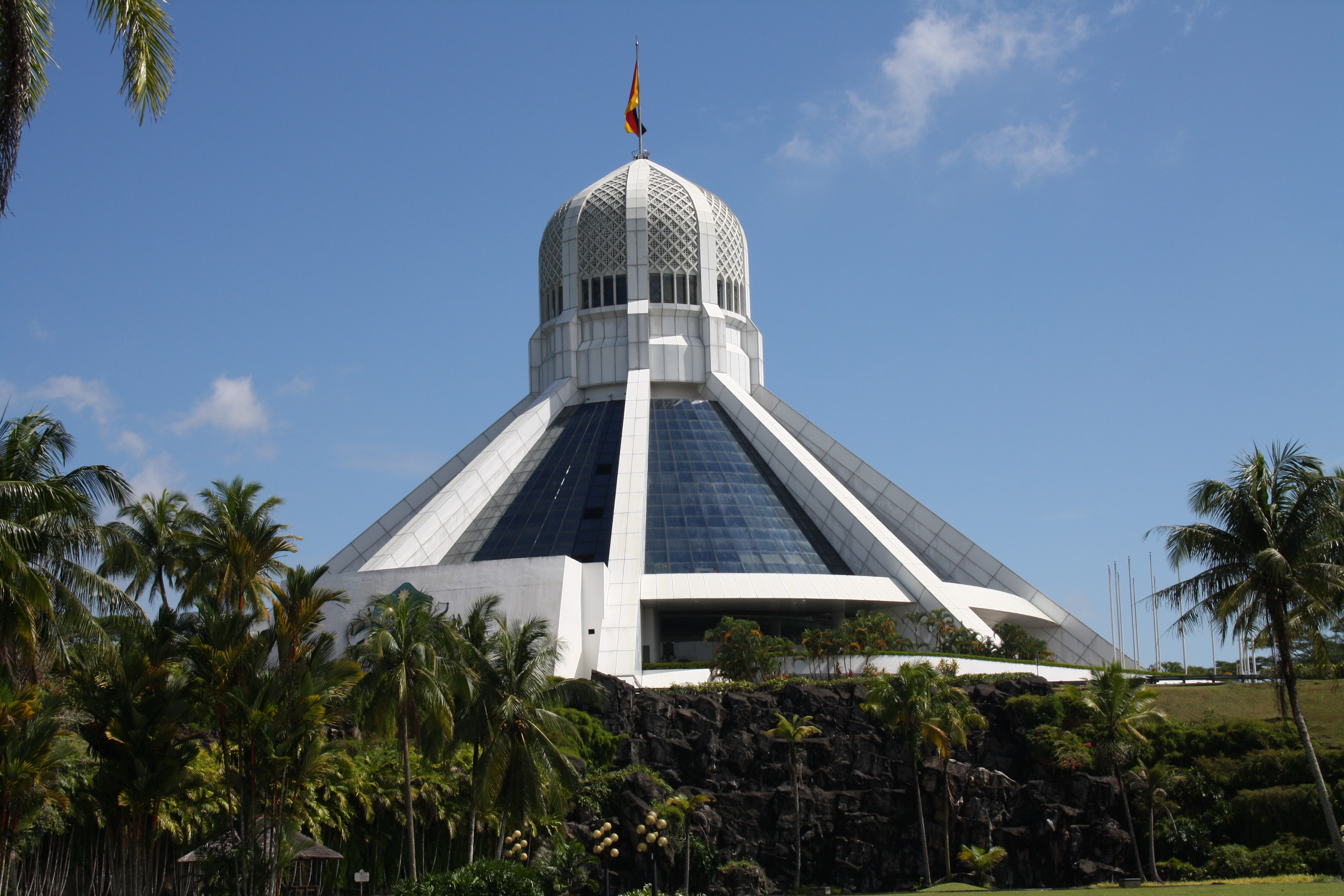

Agency overview
- Formed: 1 August 1988; 37 years ago
- Preceding agency: Kuching Municipal Council
- Jurisdiction: Northern part of the City of Kuching
- Headquarters: Bukit Siol, Jalan Semariang, Petra Jaya, 93050 Kuching, Sarawak, Malaysia
- Motto: Untuk Masyarakat Berbudaya; Towards A Cultured Society
- Agency executives: Hilmy Othman, Mayor; Haji Mohamed Khaidir Bin Abang, Director
- Website: dbku.sarawak.gov.my

The Commission of Kuching North City Hall (Malay: Suruhanjaya Dewan Bandaraya Kuching Utara, abbreviated DBKU) is the commission which administers the northern part of the city of Kuching in the state of Sarawak, Malaysia. This commission was established after the city was officially granted city status on 1 August 1988. Their jurisdiction covers an area of 369.48 square kilometres.

The commission consists of the commissioner plus nine commission members appointed to serve a one-year term by the Sarawak State Government. DBKU is responsible for public health and sanitation, waste removal and management, town planning, environmental protection and building control, social and economic development and general maintenance functions of urban infrastructure.

== History ==
The application for Kuching to be elevated to city status was made at the behest of the people. The petition was made by the Chairman of the KMC to the Minister responsible for Local Government, who motioned for a resolution pertaining to the matter. Thus on 18 July 1984 the Resolution was passed at the State Legislative Assembly. Both the petition and Resolution were given the assent of the Yang Di–Pertua Negeri in October 1985. Thereafter, they were submitted to the Conference of Rulers for consideration, by the Prime Minister. On 3 July 1986 the Resolution was approved after the Conference of Rulers was satisfied that certain prerequisites were met.

Kuching was officially inaugurated as a city on 1 August 1988 after having met certain procedures and prerequisites. The city of Kuching is divided into 2 areas: north and south. Each of these is administered by a Commissioner for Kuching North and a Mayor for Kuching South.

Kuching City South largely covers the area previously under the Kuching Municipal Council (KMC). As it is still a local government authority, its powers and functions as conferred by the KMC Ordinance are maintained with minor changes.

Kuching City North refers to a significant part of the territory formerly administered by the Kuching Rural District Council (KRDC). It also includes a part of the former KMC area. As it is not a local authority, Kuching City North is placed under the jurisdiction of a Commissioner who is assisted by a Board of Advisors. The Commissioner is a corporate body directly responsible to the State's Chief Minister. The powers and functions of the Commissioner are contained in the Kuching City North Ordinance, which is closely modelled on that of Kuching City South.

The city's twin administration was born out of the need for an efficient system which would allow for a balanced development and population distribution for the two territories. It will also ensure that Kuching City South will not be hampered by the added responsibilities of developing Kuching City North, which had been under the Kuching Rural District Council jurisdiction.

Two prominent sons of Sarawak, Yusoff Hanifah and Song Swee Guan, were accorded the distinguished honour of being appointed by the Yang Di-Pertua Negeri as the first Commissioner of Kuching City North and the first Mayor of Kuching City South, respectively.

=== Appointed commissioners of Kuching North ===
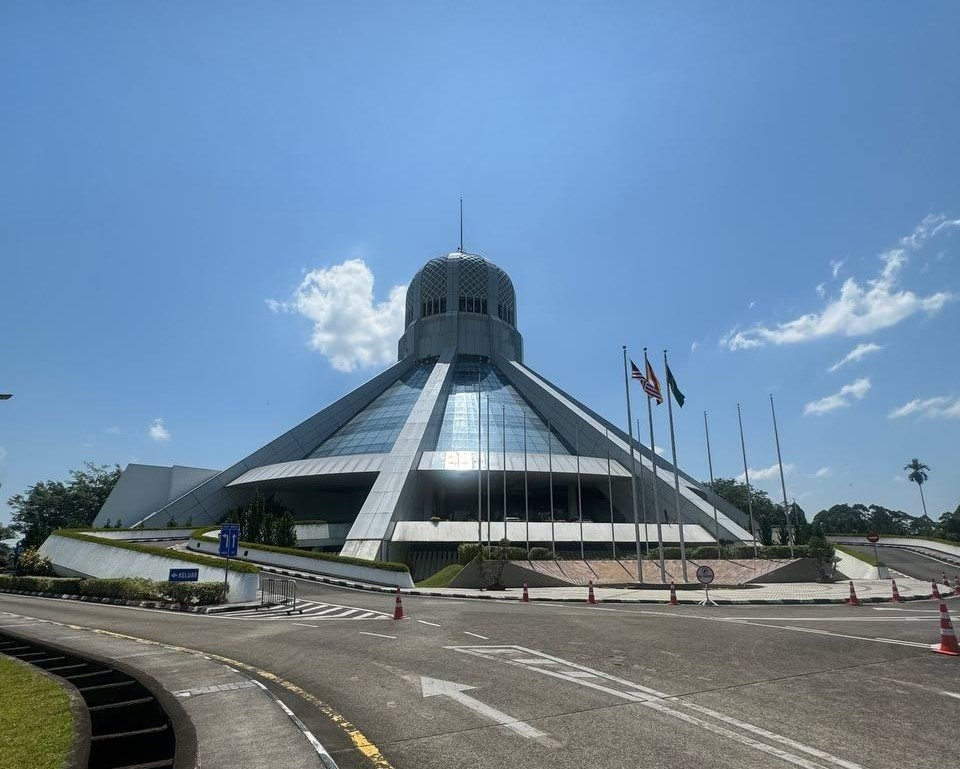
Dewan Bandaraya Kuching Utara.

| No. | Commissioner | Term start | Term end |
|---|---|---|---|
| 1. | Yusoff Hanifah | 1 August 1988 | 1994 |
| 2. | Awang Ehsan Joini | 1995 | 2000 |
| 3. | Madehi Kolek | 1 February 2001 | 31 December 2003 |
| 4. | Abdul Hamid Mohd Yusoff | 1 January 2004 | 26 July 2006 |
| 5. | Abang Atei Abang Medaan | 28 July 2006 | 31 July 2011 |
| 6. | Abang Abdul Wahap Abang Julai | 1 August 2011 | 31 August 2019 |
| 7. | Junaidi Reduan | 1 September 2019 | 31 August 2022 |
| 8. | Hilmy Othman | 1 September 2022 | |

== Departments ==
1. Kuching Cat Museum
2. DBKU City Library

== See also ==
- Kuching South City Council (MBKS)
- Padawan Municipal Council (MPP)
