= Serian Division =

- Town
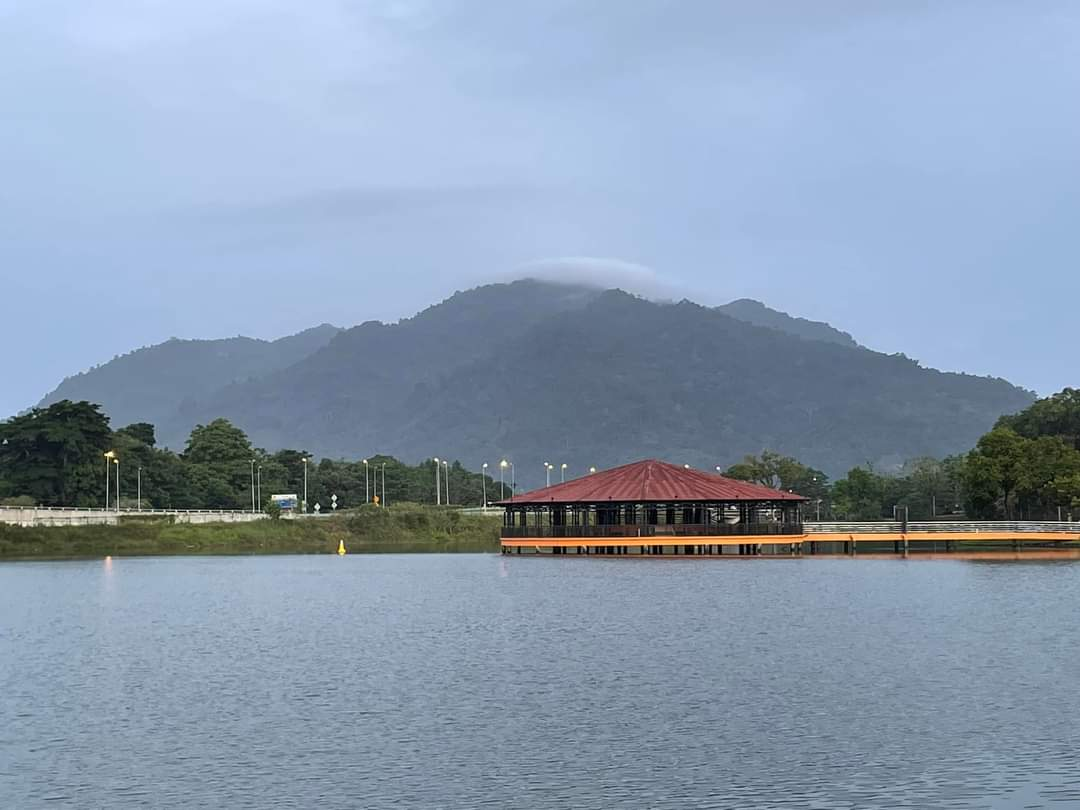
- Serian Lake Garden in 2022
- Interactive map of Serian Division
- Coordinates: 1°10′0″N 110°34′0″E
- Country: Malaysia
- State: Sarawak
- Local area government(s): Majlis Daerah Serian (MDS); Siburan District Office
- Resident: Jonathan Lugoh
- License plate prefix: QC and QV (for all vehicles except taxi)

Serian Division is a administrative division in Sarawak which separated on 11 April 2015 from Samarahan Division. It is about 64 kilometres (40 mi) from Kuching. Sub-district headquarters towns are Balai Ringin and Tebedu.

Serian Division is known for its durians. This has prompted the Serian District Council to erect a giant monument to this "king of fruits" in the middle of the market square. The town is connected to the hinterland by road and by water. Most produce is brought in from Kalimantan, Indonesia as the prices are cheaper there.

== Geography ==
Limestone formations and paddy fields can be seen along the way to Tebedu. Other attractions of Serian include Gua Tiab Bilanting which is situated at Kampung Pichin and also Bukit Parang which is located on the Sarawak-Kalimantan border. The southernmost point in Malaysia, Bukit Niat, is also located on the border between Serian Division and Kalimantan, southeast of Tebedu, at a latitude of 0°51'10" N.

There are many waterfalls found in Serian District. Ranchan Waterfall is located at about 5 km (3.1 mi) from Serian town and is easily accessible by road. Simuja Waterfall is another waterfall in Serian but was damaged badly by logging activities. It is about 7 km (4.3 mi) away from town. There is no proper road to the waterfall and visitors have to hike 1–2 km (0.62–1.24 mi) from the Serian-Sri Aman trunk road to get there.

Tebedu (formerly known as Bandar Mutiara), located about 50 km (31 mi) away from Serian town on the Indonesia-Malaysia border, is one of only three official land border crossings between Indonesia and Malaysia.

Tebakang, a small town approximately 12 km (7.5 mi) away from Serian, is home to Mayang Tea plantation, Sarawak's sole tea producer.

== Climate ==
Serian has a tropical rainforest climate (Af) with heavy to very heavy rainfall year-round.

Climate data for Serian
Month	Jan	Feb	Mar	Apr	May	Jun	Jul	Aug	Sep	Oct	Nov	Dec	Year
Mean daily maximum °C (°F)	29.9 (85.8)	30.1 (86.2)	31.0 (87.8)	31.9 (89.4)	32.3 (90.1)	32.0 (89.6)	31.9 (89.4)	31.9 (89.4)	31.7 (89.1)	31.6 (88.9)	31.2 (88.2)	30.6 (87.1)	31.3 (88.4)
Daily mean °C (°F)	26.2 (79.2)	26.3 (79.3)	26.8 (80.2)	27.4 (81.3)	27.7 (81.9)	27.3 (81.1)	27.1 (80.8)	27.1 (80.8)	27.1 (80.8)	27.1 (80.8)	26.8 (80.2)	26.5 (79.7)	27.0 (80.5)
Mean daily minimum °C (°F)	22.5 (72.5)	22.5 (72.5)	22.7 (72.9)	22.9 (73.2)	23.1 (73.6)	22.7 (72.9)	22.4 (72.3)	22.4 (72.3)	22.5 (72.5)	22.6 (72.7)	22.5 (72.5)	22.5 (72.5)	22.6 (72.7)
Average rainfall mm (inches)	438 (17.2)	348 (13.7)	290 (11.4)	286 (11.3)	252 (9.9)	191 (7.5)	179 (7.0)	229 (9.0)	282 (11.1)	321 (12.6)	353 (13.9)	410 (16.1)	3,579 (140.7)
Source: Climate-Data.org

== Demographics ==
Total population of every areas in Serian, Sarawak. These population are exactly based on their ethnics in Sarawak.

Bidayuh and Iban is the only ethnics that mostly available in Serian, along with other ethnics such as Chinese, Malay, and Melanau.

1. Bandar Serian & Tebakang

- Bidayuh : 36,805
- Iban : 23,940
- Chinese : 16,991
- Malay : 14,787
- Melanau : 221
- Orang Ulu : 73
- Indian : –
- Other ethnics : –

TOTAL : 92,817

2. Siburan (under MDS administrative area)

- Chinese : 16,817
- Bidayuh : 15,482
- Malay : 9,764
- Iban : 4,120
- Indian : 115
- Melanau : 90
- Orang Ulu : –
- Other ethnics : –

TOTAL : 46,388

3. Tebedu

- Bidayuh : 20,146
- Iban : 1,901
- Chinese : 1,822
- Malay : 1,603
- Melanau : 42
- Indian : –
- Orang Ulu : –
- Other ethnics : –

TOTAL : 25,514

4. Balai Ringin

- Iban : 19,348
- Chinese : 6,310
- Bidayuh : 5,077
- Malay : 110
- Indian : –
- Melanau : –
- Orang Ulu : –
- Other ethnics : –

TOTAL : 30,845

== Education ==
- Serian District Education Office (PPD Serian)
- Serian Teacher Activity Center (PKG Serian)

=== Primary school ===
- SK Balai Ringin
- SK Bedup
- SK Daha
- SK Engkeroh
- SK Entayan
- SK Entubuh
- SK Gahat Mawang
- SK Gemang
- SK Koran
- SK Krait
- SK Krangan
- SK Krusen
- SK Kujang Mawang
- SK Kujang Sain
- SK Lebur/Remun
- SK Lobang Batu
- SK Lubok Antu Reban
- SK Mapu
- SK Mawang Taup
- SK Melansai
- SK Mentu Tapu
- SK Merakai
- SK Merbau
- SK Mubok Berawan
- SK Parun Suan
- SK Pangkalan Sorah
- SK Pati
- SK Payau
- SK Plaman Baki/Menaul
- SK Pridan
- SK Rayang
- SK Reteh
- SK Riih Daso
- SK Rituh
- SK Samarahan Estate
- SK Sangai
- SK Sebanban
- SK Semada
- SK Semukoi
- SK Sejijag
- SK Serian
- SK Sumpas
- SK Sungai Kenyah
- SK Sungai Rimu
- SK Sungai Sameran
- SK Sungan
- SK Tanah Merah
- SK Tanah Puteh
- SK Tarat
- SK Tebakang
- SK Tebedu
- SK Tema
- SK Temong
- SK Tepoi
- SK Tesu
- SK Tian Murud
- SK Triang
- SK All Saints Plaman Nyabet
- SK ST Alban Ampungan
- SK ST Ambrose Panchor
- SK ST Anthony Kawan
- SK ST Barnabas Baru
- SK ST Dominic Pichin
- SK ST Henry Slabi
- SK ST John Mantung
- SK ST John Taee
- SK ST Jude Bunan
- SK ST Matthew Lanchang
- SK ST Michael Mongkos
- SK ST Norbert Paon Gahat
- SK ST Patrick Tangga
- SK ST Philip Bugu
- SK ST Raymond Mujat
- SK ST Teresa Serian
- SJK Chung Hua Serian
- SJK Chung Hua Bt. 29
- SJK Chung Hua Bt. 35
- SJK Chung Hua Bt. 32
- SJK Sungai Menyan
- SJK Pangkalan Bedup
- Sekolah Ayer Manis

=== Secondary school ===
- SMK Tebakang
- SMK Tarat
- SMK Taee
- SMK Serian
- SMK Tebedu
- SMK Balai Ringin

== Transport ==
=== Local Bus ===
Route No.	Operating Route
3A	Kuching-Serian
Q10	Kuching-Serian
Q14	Kuching-Siburan

== Administration ==
=== Members of Parliament ===
Parliament	Member of Parliament	Party
P198 Puncak Borneo	YB Datuk Willie Mongin	GPS-PBB
P199 Serian	YB Dato Sri Richard Riot Jaem	GPS-SUPP

== See also ==
- Kuching
- Samarahan
- Batu Kawah
- Bau
- Lundu
- Padawan municipality
- Padawan Municipal Council
- Simanggang
- Betong
- Sarikei
