= Kuching District =

District in Sarawak, Malaysia

Kuching District Daerah Kuching (Malay) 古晋县 (Chinese)
- Interactive map of Kuching District
- Coordinates: 1°33′40″N 110°20′30″E
- Country: Malaysia
- State: Sarawak
- Local area government(s): Kuching Kuching South City Council (MBKS); Commission of the City of Kuching North (DBKU); Padawan Municipal Council (MPP)

Area
  - Total: 1,868.83 km^{2} (721.56 sq mi)

Population (2025)
  - Total: 564,890
  - Density: 302.27/km^{2} (782.87/sq mi)
- Time zone: UTC+8 (MST)
- Website: (in Malay)

The Kuching District is an administrative district within Kuching Division, Sarawak, Malaysia. It is subdivided into two subdistricts which are Kuching Proper and Padawan. As of 2025, the population of this entire Kuching District was 564,890.

Map of Kuching District

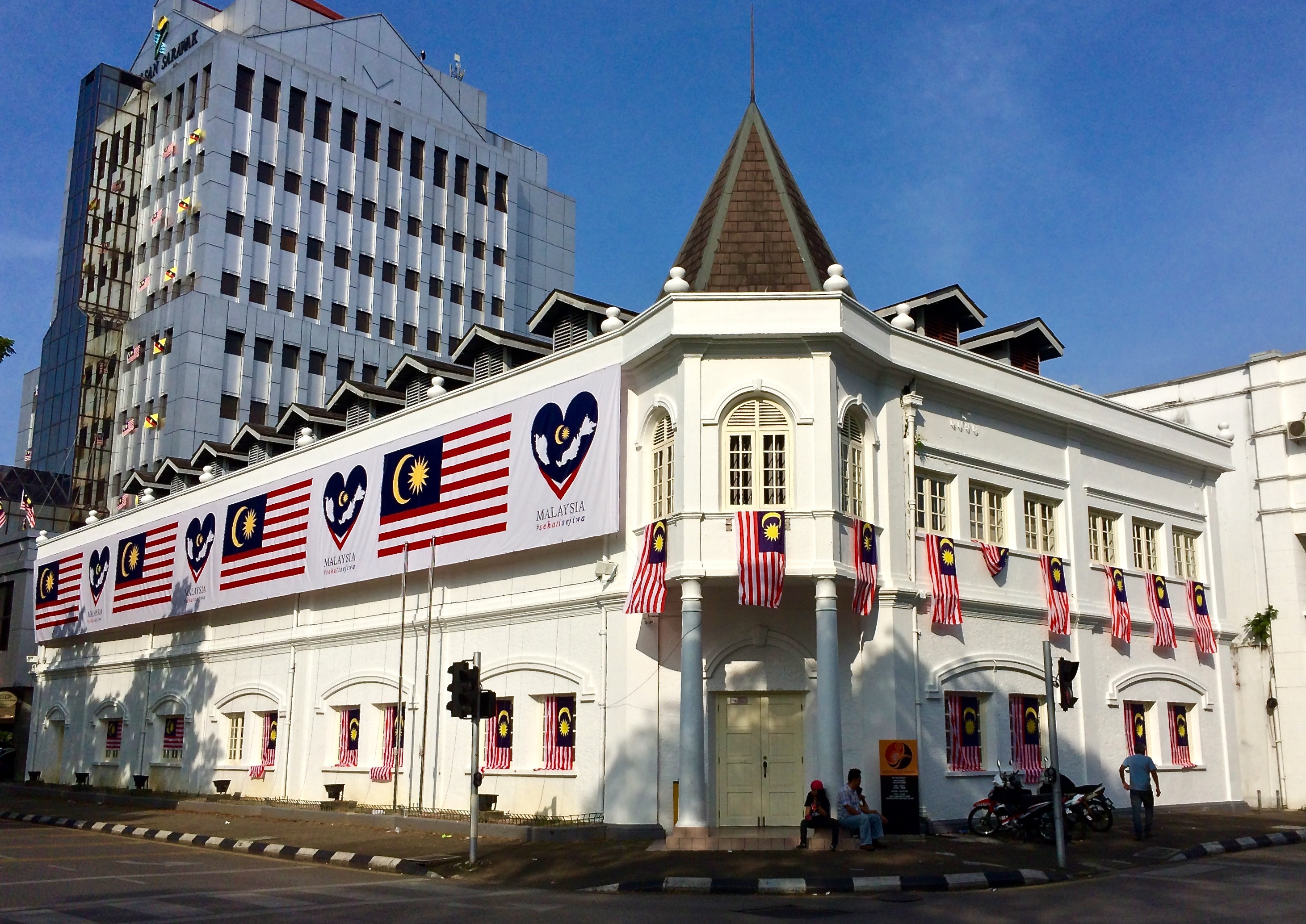
Kuching Resident and District Office

Historical population
Year	Pop.	±%
1975	86,254	—
1980	91,395	+6.0%
1985	97,682	+6.9%
1990	119,548	+22.4%
1995	134,871	+12.8%
2000	148,625	+10.2%
2005	173,920	+17.0%
2011	228,463	+31.4%
2016	302,985	+32.6%
2021	411,362	+35.8%
2025	564,890	+37.3%

== Kuching Proper subdistrict ==
The Kuching Proper subdistrict is divided into two areas:

- the metropolitan city area, more commonly known as Kuching City.
- the suburbs and rural areas, collectively known as the Padawan municipality (formerly known as the Kuching Rural District). Their headquarters are situated in Kota Padawan (formerly named as 10th Mile Bazaar).

== Padawan subdistrict ==
Padawan was proclaimed as a subdistrict on 11 August 1983 and is headquartered in Teng Bukap.
