= COVID-19 pandemic in Sarawak =

Ongoing COVID-19 viral pandemic in Sarawak, Malaysia

- Disease: COVID-19
- Pathogen: SARS-CoV-2
- Location: Sarawak, Malaysia
- First outbreak: Wuhan, Hubei, China
- Index case: Kuching District
- Arrival date: 13 March 2020 (6 years, 5 months, 1 week and 4 days)
- Confirmed cases: 318,731
- Active cases: 709
- Recovered: 316,252
- Deaths: 1,770
- Fatality rate: 0.56%
- Vaccinations: 2,175,974 (people with at least one dose); 2,131,501 (fully vaccinated people); 1,327,796 (boosters)

Government website
- sarawakdisastermc.com

The COVID-19 pandemic was confirmed to have reached the state of Sarawak, Malaysia in March 2020. As of 16 November 2022, there are 318,731 confirmed cases.

== Timeline ==
=== First wave ===
==== March 2020 ====
On 13 March, Sarawak has recorded its first COVID-19 cases, with three patients tested positive for the virus in Kuching. The Sarawak Disaster Management Committee in a statement said 2 cases were from the cluster who attended a religious gathering at Sri Petaling Mosque in Kuala Lumpur on 28 February to 1 March, the third cases was a family member of case 2.

On 14 March, The Sarawak Disaster Management Committee reported 6 new cases were recorded, bringing the total of positive cases to nine. The chairman, Datuk Amar Douglas Uggah said 2 new cases were recorded in Limbang while 4 new cases were recorded in Kuching. All new cases were from the cluster who attended a religious gathering at Sri Petaling Mosque.

On 15 March, Sarawak recorded 11 new positive cases of COVID-19, bringing the total to 20 cases. Among the 11 new cases, one of them was Sarikei MP Wong Ling Biu after tested positive for the virus in Sibu Hospital. Sarawak DAP chairman Chong Chieng Jen directed all party members and lawmakers who had close contact with the Sarikei MP in the last 14 days to self-quarantine for two weeks.

On 16 March, State Minister of Local Government and Housing Datuk Sri Dr Sim Kui Hian said 14 new COVID-19 cases were recorded making the total cases to 34. Among the new cases, 6 are from Kuching, 4 from Betong, 2 from Sarikei and one each from Serian and Simunjan. One of the 2 cases from Sarikei was Malaysian national hammer thrower Jackie Wong Siew Cheer as he was tested positive for the virus in Sibu Hospital after visiting his father, Sarikei MP Wong Ling Biu who was also tested positive for the virus on 15 March.

On 17 March, Sarawak records nation first COVID-19 death involving Patient 18. They died at Sarawak General Hospital. Sarawak also recorded 11 new positive cases bringing the total to 45. Out of 11 new cases, 6 are from Kuching, 3 from Limbang and one each from Betong and Lawas.

On 18 March, Sarawak Disaster Management Committee confirms 5 new positive cases for COVID-19 with 2 patients currently treated in Sarawak General Hospital, 2 in Sibu Hospital and one in Bintulu Hospital. The Sarawak government has enforced measures that align with the federal government movement control order from 18 March to 31 March 2020. On 19 March, Sarawak recorded one new positive case in Kuching making the total to 51. Sarawak Disaster Management Committee (SDMC) put together a team from various agencies to reduce the spread of the coronavirus. This includes the monitoring of immigration of those entering and exiting Sarawak, combating fake news and digital surveillance. Sarawak Multimedia Authority (SMA) together with a Sarawak-based technology development company, SOCOE Sdn Bhd developed enterSarawak an online system was developed within 36 hours after the announcement of the MCO .'enterSarawak' – is a mobile and web-based system integrated into i-Alerts that allows SDMC to have complete control as well as monitor the comings and goings of the people in Sarawak. enterSarawak serves as the first point of contact for the public to get permission to enter or exit the state. This includes short term entry into the state for transit passengers, flight crew, freight and shipping personnel as well as essential services staff.

On 20 March, Sarawak recorded 7 new COVID-19 cases bringing the total to 58 cases. Sarawak Deputy Chief Minister Datuk Amar Douglas Uggah said all 7 cases were reported in Kuching and are currently treated at Sarawak General Hospital. 4 of the cases are among the cluster who attended a religious gathering at Sri Petaling Mosque in Kuala Lumpur on 28 February to 1 March. 2 cases were local church cluster while one is still under investigation. State Disaster Management Committee has identified 4 possible COVID-19 clusters other than the religious gathering at Sri Petaling Mosque namely Emmanuel Baptist Church Kuching cluster, Good News Fellowship Church cluster, DAP fundraising dinner cluster and Josephian Day cluster at SMK St Joseph Kuching. Sarawak Multimedia Authority (SMA) has come up with a tracking device to be used by those under home quarantine which will be attached to their wrists and a digital mapping method would also be used to identify hotspots of COVID-19 infections to prevent its spread.

On 21 March, Sarawak's National Safety Council branch had identified seven hot spots related to the pandemic, which are Kuching, Serian, Betong, Sarikei, Bintulu, Miri and Limbang. Another two deaths in the state involving a 79-year-old woman and her 40-year-old daughter were reported within the day. Sarawak Disaster Management Committee reported 10 new positive cases in the state (inclusive both that died on the same day) making the total to 68 cases.

On 22 March, Sarawak Disaster Management Committee recorded 8 new positive COVID-19 cases bringing the total to 76. On 23 March, Sarawak announced 2 new COVID-19 deaths involving a 49-year-old man from Kuching and a 51-year-old woman from Limbang. Sarawak also recorded 6 new positive COVID-19 cases, all from Kuching bringing the total cases to 82. Sarawak Chief Minister Datuk Patinggi Abang Johari Tun Openg announced RM1.15 billion special aid package to reduce COVID-19 impact on the state.

On 24 March, Sarawak recorded 5 new positive COVID-19 cases with 2 each from Sarawak General Hospital and Sibu Hospital and one in Miri Hospital. According to Sarawak Disaster Management Committee clusters statistic, one of the new cases in Sarawak General Hospital is from the religious gathering at Sri Petaling Mosque in Kuala Lumpur while the other one are connected to the church cluster. The 2 new cases in Sibu Hospital are also from the religious gathering at Sri Petaling Mosque in Kuala Lumpur.

On 25 March, 4 new positive cases were recorded, bringing the total to 91. Another 4 new positive cases were detected the following day.

On 27 March, Sarawak Disaster Management Committee said 15 new cases recorded where all of the cases are treated at Sarawak General Hospital. 7 of them have been traced to having close contacts with three family members who died from the virus due to an imported case from Italy, 4 from the Good News Fellowship Church in Kuching and the other four to the religious gathering at Sri Petaling Mosque in Kuala Lumpur.

On 28 March, Sarawak recorded 8 new positive cases with 7 cases are treated at Sarawak General Hospital and one at Sibu Hospital. Sarawak also recorded 9 positive patients recovered and has been discharged from hospital. On 29 March, 11 new cases recorded in Sarawak General Hospital bringing the total to 129.

On 30 March, Sarawak recorded 2 COVID-19 deaths, one from Sarawak General Hospital and another one from Miri Hospital. 6 new cases were recorded in the state making the total to 135 where 3 cases recorded in Sarawak General Hospital, 2 in Miri Hospital and one in Sibu Hospital. On 31 March, Sarawak recorded nation's first foreign COVID-19 death involving Indonesian lecturer in Sarawak General Hospital. 21 new cases recorded in the state and 5 more patients recovered and discharged from hospital.

==== April 2020 ====
On 1 April, Sarawak recorded 32 new positive cases with one from Samarahan and the rest from Kuching. On 2 April, Sarawak Disaster Management Committee said 23 new cases and 1 death were recorded bringing the total cases to 211. Another 28 new cases recorded in the state the following day.

On 4 April, Sarawak recorded 1 more COVID-19 death bringing the death toll to 10 deaths. The state also recorded 15 new positive cases with 13 from Sarawak General Hospital and one each from Sibu Hospital and Miri Hospital. On 5 April, 10 new positive cases were recorded in the state with 2 new deaths from the Sarawak General Hospital.

On 6 April, 9 new positive COVID-19 cases recorded bringing the total to 273. 34 positive patients have recovered and discharged from hospital to date. Another 15 new cases recorded in the state the following day with 14 cases were being treated at Sarawak General Hospital and one at Miri Hospital.

On 8 April, Sarawak Disaster Management Committee said 18 new cases recorded making the total to 306. 39 positive patients have recovered and discharged from hospital to date.

On 9 April, Sarawak recorded another death involving a 23-year-old student from Universiti Malaysia Sarawak who lived in Kota Samarahan and was admitted to Sarawak General Hospital on 30 March. She was the 5th generation of the Good News Fellowship Church cluster in Kuching. Sarawak also recorded 6 new positive cases bringing the total to 312 with 5 cases from Sarawak General Hospital and one from Bintulu Hospital.

On 10 April, Sarawak Disaster Management Committee said 15 new positive cases recorded in Sarawak making the total to 327. 14 patients recovered and discharged from hospital bringing it to 53 recovered to date. 7 new cases recorded in Sarawak on 11 April, 12 April and 13 April respectively. Another 15 new cases recorded in Sarawak bringing the total to 363.

On 18 April, Sarawak recorded 6 new positive cases where all cases were admitted at Sarawak General Hospital bringing the total positive cases to 403. 2 new recoveries recorded in Sarawak General Hospital making the total recoveries in the state to 57. On 19 April, Sarawak recorded 5 new positive cases where all cases were admitted at Sarawak General Hospital bringing the total positive cases to 408. 5 new recoveries recorded in Sarawak General Hospital and 2 more in Sibu Hospital making the total recoveries in the state to 64. On 20 April, Sarawak recorded 6 new positive cases where 4 cases were admitted at Sarawak General Hospital and 2 at Bintulu Hospital bringing the total positive cases to 414. 4 new recoveries recorded in Sarawak General Hospital making the total recoveries in the state to 68.

On 21 April, Sarawak recorded 22 new positive cases where all cases were admitted at Sarawak General Hospital bringing the total positive cases to 436. 20 new recoveries recorded in Sarawak General Hospital making the total recoveries in the state to 88. 1 fatality recorded in the state involving a 69-year-old male who was admitted to Sarawak General Hospital on 3 April and was found positive COVID-19 on 7 April. On 22 April, Sarawak recorded 19 new positive cases where 18 cases were admitted at Sarawak General Hospital and one at Miri Hospital bringing the total positive cases to 455. 17 new recoveries recorded with 15 in Sarawak General Hospital, one each in Sibu Hospital and Miri Hospital making the total recoveries in the state to 105. 1 fatality recorded in the state involving a 72-year-old female from Sri Aman who was admitted to Sarawak General Hospital on 20 April and was found positive COVID-19 on 22 April. On 23 April, Sarawak recorded 4 new positive cases where 3 cases were admitted at Sarawak General Hospital and one at Miri Hospital bringing the total positive cases to 459. 27 new recoveries recorded with 21 in Sarawak General Hospital, 2 in Sibu Hospital, 1 in Bintulu Hospital and 3 in Miri Hospital making the total recoveries in the state to 131.

On 24 April, Sarawak recorded 9 new positive cases where all cases were admitted at Sarawak General Hospital bringing the total positive cases to 468. 17 new recoveries recorded with 16 in Sarawak General Hospital and one in Sibu Hospital making the total recoveries in the state to 147. 4 more divisions which previously classified as yellow zone namely Mukah, Sarikei, Sibu and Limbang were now classified as green zone as these divisions recorded 0 cases in the last 14 days. On 25 April, Sarawak recorded 10 new positive cases where 9 cases were admitted at Sarawak General Hospital and one at Miri Hospital bringing the total positive cases to 478. 2 new recoveries recorded where all cases recorded in Sarawak General Hospital making the total recoveries in the state to 150. On 26 April, Sarawak recorded 7 new positive cases where 6 cases were admitted at Sarawak General Hospital and one at Miri Hospital bringing the total positive cases to 485. 29 new recoveries recorded where 25 cases recorded in Sarawak General Hospital, one in Sibu Hospital and 3 in Miri Hospital making the total recoveries in the state to 179. On 27 April, Sarawak recorded 3 new positive cases where 2 cases were admitted at Sarawak General Hospital and one at Bintulu Hospital bringing the total positive cases to 488. 17 new recoveries recorded where 16 cases recorded in Sarawak General Hospital and one in Miri Hospital making the total recoveries in the state to 194.

On 28 April, Sarawak recorded 8 new positive cases where 7 cases were admitted at Sarawak General Hospital and one at Miri Hospital bringing the total positive cases to 496. 11 new recoveries recorded where 6 cases recorded in Sarawak General Hospital, 4 in Miri Hospital and one in Sibu Hospital making the total recoveries in the state to 204. Limbang is now classified as yellow zone again from green zone as the division recorded 1 new positive case. On 29 April, Sarawak recorded 6 new positive cases where all cases were admitted at Sarawak General Hospital bringing the total positive cases to 502. 12 new recoveries recorded where 9 cases recorded in Sarawak General Hospital and 3 in Miri Hospital making the total recoveries in the state to 216. On 30 April, Sarawak recorded 5 new positive cases where all cases were admitted at Sarawak General Hospital bringing the total positive cases to 507. 6 new recoveries recorded where all cases recorded in Sarawak General Hospital making the total recoveries in the state to 222. 1 fatality recorded in the state involving a 72-year-old male from Kuching who was admitted to Sarawak Heart Centre in Kota Samarahan on 13 April and was found positive COVID-19 on 18 April.

==== May 2020 ====
On 1 May, Sarawak recorded 2 new positive cases where all cases were admitted at Sarawak General Hospital bringing the total positive cases to 509. 33 new recoveries recorded where 32 cases recorded in Sarawak General Hospital and one in Miri Hospital making the total recoveries in the state to 255. Betong is now classified as green zone from yellow zone as the division recorded 0 new positive case in the last 14 days. On 2 May, Sarawak recorded 9 new positive cases where all cases were admitted at Sarawak General Hospital bringing the total positive cases to 518. 19 new recoveries recorded where all cases recorded in Sarawak General Hospital making the total recoveries in the state to 271.

On 3 May, Sarawak recorded 5 new positive cases where 4 cases were admitted at Sarawak General Hospital and one in Sibu Hospital bringing the total positive cases to 523. 11 new recoveries recorded where all cases recorded in Sarawak General Hospital making the total recoveries in the state to 282. On 4 May, Sarawak recorded 0 new positive cases for the first time since 13 March 2020. 19 new recoveries recorded where 18 cases recorded in Sarawak General Hospital and one in Miri Hospital making the total recoveries in the state to 301.

On 5 May, Sarawak recorded 2 new positive cases where all cases were admitted at Sarawak General Hospital bringing the total positive cases to 525. 9 new recoveries recorded where 8 cases recorded in Sarawak General Hospital and one in Miri Hospital making the total recoveries in the state to 310. On 6 May, Sarawak recorded 11 new positive cases where all cases were admitted at Sarawak General Hospital bringing the total positive cases to 536. 26 new recoveries recorded where 25 cases recorded in Sarawak General Hospital and one in Bintulu Hospital making the total recoveries in the state to 334.

On 7 May, Sarawak recorded 1 new positive cases where the case were admitted at Sarawak General Hospital bringing the total positive cases to 537. 3 new recoveries recorded where all cases recorded in Sarawak General Hospital making the total recoveries in the state to 329. On 8 May, Sarawak recorded 1 new positive cases where the case were admitted at Sarawak General Hospital bringing the total positive cases to 538. 6 new recoveries recorded where 5 cases recorded in Sarawak General Hospital and one in Sibu Hospital making the total recoveries in the state to 334.

On 9 May, Sarawak recorded 4 new positive cases where all cases were admitted at Sarawak General Hospital bringing the total positive cases to 542. 16 new recoveries recorded where all cases recorded in Sarawak General Hospital making the total recoveries in the state to 350. Sarawak also recorded 17 re-tested positive cases where 8 cases admitted to Sarawak General Hospital, 7 in Sibu Hospital and 2 in Bintulu Hospital. On 10 May, Sarawak recorded 1 new positive cases where the case were admitted at Sarawak General Hospital bringing the total positive cases to 543. 10 new recoveries recorded where all cases recorded in Sarawak General Hospital making the total recoveries in the state to 360.

On 11 May, Sarawak recorded 0 new positive cases bringing the total positive cases to 543. 9 new recoveries recorded where all cases recorded in Sarawak General Hospital making the total recoveries in the state to 369. Bintulu is now classified as green zone from yellow zone as the division recorded 0 new positive case in the last 14 days. On 12 May, no positive cases recorded in the state bringing the total positive cases remain 543. 6 new recoveries recorded where 4 cases recorded in Sarawak General Hospital, one in Sibu Hospital and one in Miri Hospital making the total recoveries in the state to 375. Limbang is now classified as green zone from yellow zone as the division recorded 0 new positive case in the last 14 days.

On 13 May, Sarawak recorded 1 new positive cases bringing the total positive cases to 544. 16 new recoveries recorded where 14 cases recorded in Sarawak General Hospital and 2 in Sibu Hospital making the total recoveries in the state to 390. On 14 May, no positive cases recorded in the state bringing the total positive cases remain 544. 9 new recoveries recorded where 8 cases recorded in Sarawak General Hospital and one in Sibu Hospital making the total recoveries in the state to 399.

On 15 May, no positive cases recorded in the state bringing the total positive cases remain 544. 6 new recoveries recorded where all cases recorded in Sarawak General Hospital making the total recoveries in the state to 405. Kuching is now classified as yellow zone from red zone where the number of new cases are less than 40 in the last 14 days. On 16 May, no positive cases recorded in the state bringing the total positive cases remain 544. 23 new recoveries recorded where 19 cases recorded in Sarawak General Hospital, 3 in Bintulu Hospital and one in Sibu Hospital making the total recoveries in the state to 428.

On 17 May, no positive cases recorded in the state bringing the total positive cases remain 544. 4 new recoveries recorded where all cases recorded in Sarawak General Hospital making the total recoveries in the state to 432. On 18 May, no positive cases recorded in the state bringing the total positive cases remain 544. 4 new recoveries recorded where 3 cases recorded in Sarawak General Hospital and one in Sibu Hospital making the total recoveries in the state to 435. On 19 May, no positive cases recorded in the state bringing the total positive cases remain 544. 2 new recoveries recorded where one cases recorded in Sarawak General Hospital and another one in Sibu Hospital making the total recoveries in the state to 437.

On 20 May, no positive cases recorded in the state bringing the total positive cases remain 544. 2 new recoveries recorded where one cases recorded in Sarawak General Hospital and another one in Sibu Hospital making the total recoveries in the state to 439. Samarahan is now classified as green zone from yellow zone as the division recorded 0 new positive case in the last 14 days. On 21 May, no positive cases recorded in the state bringing the total positive cases remain 544. 16 new recoveries recorded where all cases recorded in Sarawak General Hospital making the total recoveries in the state to 455.

On 22 May, Sarawak recorded 1 new positive cases where the case were admitted at Sarawak General Hospital bringing the total positive cases to 545. 4 new recoveries recorded where 3 cases recorded in Sarawak General Hospital and one in Bintulu Hospital making the total recoveries in the state to 459. On 23 May, no positive cases recorded in the state bringing the total positive cases remain 545. 5 new recoveries recorded where all cases recorded in Sarawak General Hospital making the total recoveries in the state to 464.

On 24 May, no positive cases recorded in the state bringing the total positive cases remain 545. 6 new recoveries recorded where 4 cases recorded in Sarawak General Hospital and 4 in Bintulu Hospital making the total recoveries in the state to 470. On 25 May, Sarawak recorded 4 new positive cases where 2 cases were admitted at Sarawak General Hospital, one in Sibu Hospital and one in Bintulu Hospital bringing the total positive cases to 549. 3 new recoveries recorded where 2 cases recorded in Sarawak General Hospital and one in Sibu Hospital making the total recoveries in the state to 473. Serian, Bintulu and Tanjung Manis is now classified as yellow zone from green zone after each district recorded one new positive cases.

On 27 May, Sarawak recorded 3 new positive cases where all cases were admitted at Sarawak General Hospital bringing the total positive cases to 552. 3 new recoveries recorded where 2 cases recorded in Bintulu Hospital and one in Sibu Hospital making the total recoveries in the state to 476. Samarahan is now classified as yellow zone from green zone as the division recorded one new positive cases. Sibu is now classified as green zone from yellow zone as the division recorded 0 new positive case in the last 14 days. On 28 May, no positive cases recorded in the state bringing the total positive cases remain 552. 10 new recoveries recorded where 3 cases recorded in Sarawak General Hospital, 3 cases in Sibu Hospital, 2 cases in Bintulu Hospital and 2 cases in Miri Hospital making the total recoveries in the state to 486.

On 29 May, no positive cases recorded in the state bringing the total positive cases remain 552. 13 new recoveries recorded where all cases recorded in Sarawak General Hospital making the total recoveries in the state to 499. On 30 May, no positive cases recorded in the state bringing the total positive cases remain 552. 2 new recoveries recorded where all cases recorded in Sarawak General Hospital making the total recoveries in the state to 501. On 31 May, no positive cases recorded in the state bringing the total positive cases remain 552. 7 new recoveries recorded where all cases recorded in Sarawak General Hospital making the total recoveries in the state to 508.

==== June 2020 ====
On 2 June, no positive cases recorded in the state bringing the total positive cases remain 552. 11 new recoveries recorded where 10 cases recorded in Sarawak General Hospital and one in Sibu Hospital making the total recoveries in the state to 519. On 3 June, no positive cases recorded in the state bringing the total positive cases remain 552. 1 new recoveries recorded where the cases recorded in Sarawak General Hospital making the total recoveries in the state to 520. On 4 June, no positive cases recorded in the state bringing the total positive cases remain 552. 3 new recoveries recorded where 2 cases recorded in Sarawak General Hospital and one in Sibu Hospital making the total recoveries in the state to 523.

On 5 June, Sarawak recorded one new positive cases where the case were admitted at Sarawak General Hospital bringing the total positive cases to 553. No new recoveries recorded in the state bringing the total recoveries cases remain 523. On 6 June, Sarawak recorded 2 new positive cases where all cases were admitted at Sarawak General Hospital bringing the total positive cases to 555. 1 new recoveries recorded where the cases recorded in Sarawak General Hospital making the total recoveries in the state to 524. On 7 June, no positive cases recorded in the state bringing the total positive cases remain 555. 1 new recoveries recorded where the cases recorded in Sibu Hospital making the total recoveries in the state to 525.

On 9 June, Sarawak detected foreign worker cluster in Kuching after recorded one new positive cases involving Indonesian worker where the case were admitted at Sarawak General Hospital bringing the total positive cases to 556. No new recoveries recorded in the state bringing the total recoveries cases remain 525. On 10 June, no positive cases recorded in the state bringing the total positive cases remain 556. 1 new recoveries recorded where the cases recorded in Sarawak General Hospital making the total recoveries in the state to 526. On 11 June, no positive cases recorded in the state bringing the total positive cases remain 556. 5 new recoveries recorded where 4 cases recorded in Sarawak General Hospital and one in Bintulu Hospital making the total recoveries in the state to 531.

On 13 June, no positive cases recorded in the state bringing the total positive cases remain 556. 5 new recoveries recorded where all cases recorded in Sarawak General Hospital making the total recoveries in the state to 533. On 14 June, Sarawak recorded one new positive cases where the case were admitted at Bintulu Hospital bringing the total positive cases to 557. No new recoveries recorded in the state bringing the total recoveries cases remain 533. On 15 June, no positive cases recorded in the state bringing the total positive cases remain 557. 5 new recoveries recorded where all cases recorded in Sarawak General Hospital making the total recoveries in the state to 534.

On 16 June, Sarawak recorded 3 new positive cases where all cases were admitted at Bintulu Hospital bringing the total positive cases to 560. No new recoveries recorded in the state bringing the total recoveries cases remain 534. On 17 June, Sarawak recorded one new positive cases where the case were admitted at Bintulu Hospital bringing the total positive cases to 561. No new recoveries recorded in the state bringing the total recoveries cases remain 534. On 18 June, Sarawak recorded 4 new positive cases where all cases were admitted at Sarawak General Hospital bringing the total positive cases to 565. No new recoveries recorded in the state bringing the total recoveries cases remain 534.

On 19 June, Director-General Noor Hisham Abdullah identified a new cluster consisting of six cases in Kidurong, Sarawak. The index case was a university student who had tested positive for COVID-19 on 12 June. Contact tracing identified 231 people who had been contact with the patient, 163 of whom had tested negative for the virus. Sarawak recorded one new positive cases where the case were admitted at Bintulu Hospital bringing the total positive cases to 566. 1 new recoveries recorded where the cases recorded in Sarawak General Hospital making the total recoveries in the state to 535. On 21 June, Sarawak recorded 3 new positive cases where all cases were admitted at Bintulu Hospital bringing the total positive cases to 569. No new recoveries recorded in the state bringing the total recoveries cases remain 534.

On 24 June, Sarawak recorded one new positive cases where the case were admitted at Sarawak General Hospital bringing the total positive cases to 570. No new recoveries recorded in the state bringing the total recoveries cases remain 535. On 25 June, no positive cases recorded in the state bringing the total positive cases remain 570. 2 new recoveries recorded where all cases recorded in Sarawak General Hospital making the total recoveries in the state to 537. On 28 June, Sarawak recorded one new positive cases where the case were admitted at Sibu Hospital bringing the total positive cases to 571. No new recoveries recorded in the state bringing the total recoveries cases remain 537. On 30 June, no positive cases recorded in the state bringing the total positive cases remain 571. One new recoveries recorded where the case recorded in Sarawak General Hospital making the total recoveries in the state to 538.

=== Second wave ===
==== July 2020 ====
On 1 July, no positive cases recorded in the state bringing the total positive cases remain 571. 6 new recoveries recorded where 5 case recorded in Bintulu Hospital and one in Sarawak General Hospital making the total recoveries in the state to 544. On 3 July, no positive cases recorded in the state bringing the total positive cases remain 571. One new recoveries recorded where the case recorded in Sarawak General Hospital making the total recoveries in the state to 545. On 5 July, no positive cases recorded in the state bringing the total positive cases remain 571. One new recoveries recorded where the case recorded in Sarawak General Hospital making the total recoveries in the state to 546.

On 6 July, Sarawak recorded one new positive cases where the case were admitted at Bintulu Hospital bringing the total positive cases to 572. 3 new recoveries recorded where all cases recorded in Bintulu Hospital making the total recoveries in the state to 549. On 7 July, no positive cases recorded in the state bringing the total positive cases remain 572. 2 new recoveries recorded where one case recorded in Sarawak General Hospital and Bintulu Hospital making the total recoveries in the state to 551. On 8 July, Sarawak Disaster Committee chairman Datuk Amar Douglas Uggah announced that Sarawak has been declared a green zone state. One new positive cases where the case were admitted at Sibu Hospital bringing the total positive cases to 573. No new recoveries recorded in the state bringing the total recoveries cases remain 551.

On 10 July, Sarawak recorded 2 new positive cases where all cases were admitted at Sarawak General Hospital bringing the total positive cases to 575 which makes Sarawak declared as yellow zone. One new recoveries recorded where the case recorded in Sibu Hospital making the total recoveries in the state to 552. On 11 July, Sarawak recorded 2 new positive cases where all cases were admitted at Sarawak General Hospital bringing the total positive cases to 577. No new recoveries recorded in the state bringing the total recoveries cases remain 552. 1 fatality recorded in the state involving a 72-year-old male from Kuching who was admitted to Sarawak General Hospital on 9 July and was found positive COVID-19 on 10 July.

On 12 July, Sarawak recorded 2 new positive cases where all cases were admitted at Sarawak General Hospital bringing the total positive cases to 579. No new recoveries recorded in the state bringing the total recoveries cases remain 552. On 13 July, Sarawak recorded one new positive case where the case were admitted at Bintulu Hospital bringing the total positive cases to 580. No new recoveries recorded in the state bringing the total recoveries cases remain 552. On 14 July, no positive cases recorded in the state bringing the total positive cases remain 580. 2 new recoveries recorded where all cases recorded in Sarawak General Hospital making the total recoveries in the state to 554.

On 15 July, Sarawak recorded 3 new positive cases where all cases were admitted at Sarawak General Hospital bringing the total positive cases to 583. No new recoveries recorded in the state bringing the total recoveries cases remain 554. On 16 July, Sarawak recorded one new positive cases where the case were admitted at Sarawak General Hospital bringing the total positive cases to 584. No new recoveries recorded in the state bringing the total recoveries cases remain 554. On 17 July, Sarawak recorded 10 new positive cases where 8 cases were admitted at Sarawak General Hospital and 2 at Bintulu Hospital bringing the total positive cases to 594. No new recoveries recorded in the state bringing the total recoveries cases remain 554.

On 18 July, Sarawak recorded 7 new positive cases where 6 cases were admitted at Sarawak General Hospital and one at Bintulu Hospital bringing the total positive cases to 601. No new recoveries recorded in the state bringing the total recoveries cases remain 554. On 19 July, Sarawak recorded 6 new positive cases where all cases were admitted at Sarawak General Hospital bringing the total positive cases to 607. No new recoveries recorded in the state bringing the total recoveries cases remain 554. On 20 July, Sarawak recorded one new positive cases where the case were admitted at Sarawak General Hospital bringing the total positive cases to 608. No new recoveries recorded in the state bringing the total recoveries cases remain 554.

On 21 July, Sarawak recorded 11 new positive cases where all cases were admitted at Sarawak General Hospital bringing the total positive cases to 619. 2 new recoveries recorded where one cases recorded in Sibu Hospital and Bintulu Hospital respectively making the total recoveries in the state to 556. On 22 July, Sarawak recorded 9 new positive cases where all cases were admitted at Sarawak General Hospital bringing the total positive cases to 628. No new recoveries recorded in the state bringing the total recoveries cases remain 556. On 23 July, Sarawak recorded 4 new positive cases where all cases were admitted at Sarawak General Hospital bringing the total positive cases to 632. No new recoveries recorded in the state bringing the total recoveries cases remain 556.

On 24 July, Sarawak recorded 9 new positive cases where all cases were admitted at Sarawak General Hospital bringing the total positive cases to 641. No new recoveries recorded in the state bringing the total recoveries cases remain 556. On 25 July, Sarawak recorded 8 new positive cases where all cases were admitted at Sarawak General Hospital bringing the total positive cases to 649. 5 new recoveries recorded where all cases recorded in Sarawak General Hospital making the total recoveries in the state to 561. Sentosa Hospital has been closed to public as it has become a centre of positive COVID-19 cases. Kuching declared as red zone after recording sudden increase of positive cases in the area. On 26 July, Sarawak recorded one new positive case where the case were admitted at Sarawak General Hospital bringing the total positive cases to 650. 2 new recoveries recorded where all cases recorded in Sarawak General Hospital making the total recoveries in the state to 563. 1 fatality recorded in the state involving a 63-year-old female from Kuching who was found positive COVID-19 on 17 July.

On 28 July, Sarawak recorded 25 new positive case where all cases were admitted at Sarawak General Hospital bringing the total positive cases to 675. One new recoveries recorded where the case recorded in Sarawak General Hospital making the total recoveries in the state to 564. On 29 July, Sarawak recorded 2 new positive case where all cases were admitted at Sarawak General Hospital bringing the total positive cases to 677. One new recoveries recorded where the case recorded in Sarawak General Hospital making the total recoveries in the state to 565. On 30 July, no positive cases recorded in the state bringing the total positive cases remain 677. 6 new recoveries recorded where all cases recorded in Sarawak General Hospital making the total recoveries in the state to 571. On 31 July, Sarawak recorded one new positive case where the case were admitted at Sarawak General Hospital bringing the total positive cases to 678. 8 new recoveries recorded where all cases recorded in Sarawak General Hospital making the total recoveries in the state to 579.

==== August 2020 ====
On 1 August, no positive cases recorded in the state bringing the total positive cases remain 678. 12 new recoveries recorded where 8 cases recorded in Sarawak General Hospital, 3 in Bintulu Hospital and one in Sungai Buloh Hospital making the total recoveries in the state to 591. On 2 August, Kuching declared yellow zone from red zone after recording less than 40 cases in the last 14 days. No positive cases recorded in the state bringing the total positive cases remain 678. 3 new recoveries recorded where all cases recorded in Sarawak General Hospital making the total recoveries in the state to 594. On 3 August, no positive cases recorded in the state bringing the total positive cases remain 678. 5 new recoveries recorded where all cases recorded in Sarawak General Hospital making the total recoveries in the state to 599.

On 4 August, no positive cases recorded in the state bringing the total positive cases remain 678. 8 new recoveries recorded where all cases recorded in Sarawak General Hospital making the total recoveries in the state to 607. On 5 August, no positive cases recorded in the state bringing the total positive cases remain 678. 10 new recoveries recorded where 9 cases recorded in Sarawak General Hospital and one in Bintulu Hospital making the total recoveries in the state to 617. On 6 August, no positive cases recorded in the state bringing the total positive cases remain 678. 4 new recoveries recorded where all cases recorded in Sarawak General Hospital making the total recoveries in the state to 621.

On 7 August, Sarawak recorded one new positive case where the case were admitted at Sarawak General Hospital bringing the total positive cases to 679. 5 new recoveries recorded where all cases recorded in Sarawak General Hospital making the total recoveries in the state to 626. On 8 August, Sarawak recorded one new positive case where the case were admitted at Sarawak General Hospital bringing the total positive cases to 680. 18 new recoveries recorded where all cases recorded in Sarawak General Hospital making the total recoveries in the state to 644. On 9 August, Sarawak recorded one new positive case where the case were admitted at Sarawak General Hospital bringing the total positive cases to 681. 8 new recoveries recorded where all cases recorded in Sarawak General Hospital making the total recoveries in the state to 652.

On 10 August, no positive cases recorded in the state bringing the total positive cases remain 681. 4 new recoveries recorded where all cases recorded in Sarawak General Hospital making the total recoveries in the state to 656. On 11 August, Samarahan and Lundu is now classified as green zone from yellow zone as the districts recorded 0 new positive case in the last 14 days. No positive cases recorded in the state bringing the total positive cases remain 681. 3 new recoveries recorded where all cases recorded in Sarawak General Hospital making the total recoveries in the state to 659. On 12 August, Sarawak declared as green zone after recorded 0 new positive cases in the last 14 days.

On 14 August, Sarawak recorded one new positive case where the case were admitted at Sibu Hospital bringing the total positive cases to 682. No new recoveries recorded in the state bringing the total recoveries cases remain 659. On 18 August, no positive cases recorded in the state bringing the total positive cases remain 682. One new recoveries recorded where the case recorded in Sarawak General Hospital making the total recoveries in the state to 660. On 20 August, Sarawak recorded 4 new positive case where all cases were admitted at Bintulu Hospital bringing the total positive cases to 686. One new recoveries recorded where the case recorded in Sarawak General Hospital making the total recoveries in the state to 661.

On 21 August, Sarawak recorded one new positive case where the case were admitted at Sarawak General Hospital bringing the total positive cases to 687. No new recoveries recorded in the state bringing the total recoveries cases remain 661. On 22 August, Sarawak recorded one new positive case where the case were admitted at Miri Hospital bringing the total positive cases to 688. One new recoveries recorded where the case recorded in Sarawak General Hospital making the total recoveries in the state to 662. On 23 August, Sarawak recorded 3 new positive case where all cases were admitted at Bintulu Hospital bringing the total positive cases to 691. No new recoveries recorded in the state bringing the total recoveries cases remain 662.

On 24 August, Sarawak recorded 5 new positive case where 3 cases were admitted at Sarawak General Hospital and 2 in Bintulu Hospital bringing the total positive cases to 696. No new recoveries recorded in the state bringing the total recoveries cases remain 662. On 28 August, Sarawak recorded one new positive case where the case were admitted at Bintulu Hospital bringing the total positive cases to 697. No new recoveries recorded in the state bringing the total recoveries cases remain 662. On 29 August, Sarawak recorded one new positive case where the case were admitted at Sarawak General Hospital bringing the total positive cases to 698. No new recoveries recorded in the state bringing the total recoveries cases remain 662.

On 30 August, Sarawak recorded one new positive case where the case were admitted at Bintulu Hospital bringing the total positive cases to 699. One new recoveries recorded where the case recorded in Sibu Hospital making the total recoveries in the state to 663.

==== September 2020 ====
On 4 September, no positive cases recorded in the state bringing the total positive cases remain 699. 5 new recoveries recorded where 4 cases recorded in Bintulu Hospital and one in Sarawak General Hospital making the total recoveries in the state to 668. On 6 September, no positive cases recorded in the state bringing the total positive cases remain 699. One new recoveries recorded where the case recorded in Sarawak General Hospital making the total recoveries in the state to 669. On 7 September, no positive cases recorded in the state bringing the total positive cases remain 699. 5 new recoveries recorded where 3 cases recorded in Bintulu Hospital and 2 in Sarawak General Hospital making the total recoveries in the state to 674.

On 8 September, no positive cases recorded in the state bringing the total positive cases remain 699. 2 new recoveries recorded where all cases recorded in Bintulu Hospital making the total recoveries in the state to 676. On 9 September, Sarawak recorded one new positive case where the case were admitted at Sibu Hospital bringing the total positive cases to 700. No new recoveries recorded in the state bringing the total recoveries cases remain 676. On 11 September, no positive cases recorded in the state bringing the total positive cases remain 700. One new recoveries recorded where the case recorded in Sarawak General Hospital making the total recoveries in the state to 677.

On 12 September, no positive cases recorded in the state bringing the total positive cases remain 700. One new recoveries recorded where the case recorded in Bintulu Hospital making the total recoveries in the state to 678. On 16 September, no positive cases recorded in the state bringing the total positive cases remain 700. 2 new recoveries recorded where one cases recorded in Bintulu Hospital and Miri Hospital respectively making the total recoveries in the state to 680. On 17 September, Sarawak recorded one new positive case where the case were admitted at Sarawak General Hospital bringing the total positive cases to 701. No new recoveries recorded in the state bringing the total recoveries cases remain 680.

On 22 September, Sarawak recorded 2 new positive case where one case were admitted at Sarawak General Hospital and Bintulu Hospital bringing the total positive cases to 703. No new recoveries recorded in the state bringing the total recoveries cases remain 680. On 23 September, no positive cases recorded in the state bringing the total positive cases remain 703. One new recoveries recorded where the case recorded in Sibu Hospital making the total recoveries in the state to 681. On 26 September, Sarawak recorded one new positive case where the case were admitted at Miri Hospital bringing the total positive cases to 704. No new recoveries recorded in the state bringing the total recoveries cases remain 681.

On 27 September, Sarawak recorded 2 new positive case where all cases were admitted at Miri Hospital bringing the total positive cases to 706. No new recoveries recorded in the state bringing the total recoveries cases remain 681. On 28 September, no positive cases recorded in the state bringing the total positive cases remain 706. One new recoveries recorded where the case recorded in Sungai Buloh Hospital making the total recoveries in the state to 682. On 29 September, Sarawak recorded 3 new positive case where all cases were admitted at Sarawak General Hospital bringing the total positive cases to 709. No new recoveries recorded in the state bringing the total recoveries cases remain 682. On 30 September, Sarawak recorded 4 new positive case where 2 cases were admitted at Sarawak General Hospital and 2 at Miri Hospital bringing the total positive cases to 713. No new recoveries recorded in the state bringing the total recoveries cases remain 682.

=== Third wave ===
==== October 2020 ====
On 3 October, Sarawak recorded 3 new positive case where 2 cases were admitted at Sibu Hospital and one at Sarawak General Hospital bringing the total positive cases to 716. No new recoveries recorded in the state bringing the total recoveries cases remain 682. On 4 October, Sarawak recorded one new positive case where the case were admitted at Sibu Hospital bringing the total positive cases to 717. No new recoveries recorded in the state bringing the total recoveries cases remain 682. On 5 October, Sarawak recorded one new positive case where the case were admitted at Sarawak General Hospital bringing the total positive cases to 718. One new recoveries recorded where the case recorded in Sarawak General Hospital making the total recoveries in the state to 683.

On 6 October, Sarawak recorded 3 new positive case where one case were admitted at Sarawak General Hospital, Sibu Hospital and Miri Hospital respectively bringing the total positive cases to 721. No new recoveries recorded in the state bringing the total recoveries cases remain 683. On 7 October, Sarawak recorded 3 new positive case where 2 cases were admitted at Sarawak General Hospital and one at Bintulu Hospital bringing the total positive cases to 724. One new recoveries recorded where the case recorded in Bintulu Hospital making the total recoveries in the state to 684. On 8 October, Sarawak recorded 8 new positive case where 5 case were admitted at Sarawak General Hospital, 2 at Miri Hospital and one at Bintulu Hospital bringing the total positive cases to 732. No new recoveries recorded in the state bringing the total recoveries cases remain 684.

On 9 October, Sarawak recorded 10 new positive case where 8 case were admitted at Sarawak General Hospital, one at Sibu Hospital and one at Bintulu Hospital bringing the total positive cases to 742. No new recoveries recorded in the state bringing the total recoveries cases remain 684. On 10 October, Sarawak recorded 9 new positive case where 5 case were admitted at Sarawak General Hospital and 4 at Bintulu Hospital bringing the total positive cases to 751. One new recoveries recorded where the case recorded in Sarawak General Hospital making the total recoveries in the state to 685. On 12 October, Sarawak recorded one new positive case where the case were admitted at Sarawak General Hospital bringing the total positive cases to 752. 3 new recoveries recorded where all cases recorded in Sarawak General Hospital making the total recoveries in the state to 688.

On 13 October, no positive cases recorded in the state bringing the total positive cases remain 752. 2 new recoveries recorded where one case recorded in Sarawak General Hospital and Miri Hospital respectively making the total recoveries in the state to 690. On 14 October, Sarawak recorded 3 new positive case where 2 cases were admitted at Miri Hospital and one at Sarawak General Hospital bringing the total positive cases to 755. One new recoveries recorded where the case recorded in Sarawak General Hospital making the total recoveries in the state to 691. On 15 October, Sarawak recorded 4 new positive case where 3 cases were admitted at Sarawak General Hospital and one at Miri Hospital bringing the total positive cases to 759. 3 new recoveries recorded where 2 cases recorded in Miri Hospital and one at Sarawak General Hospital making the total recoveries in the state to 694.

On 16 October, no positive cases recorded in the state bringing the total positive cases remain 759. 2 new recoveries recorded where one case recorded in Sarawak General Hospital and Sibu Hospital respectively making the total recoveries in the state to 696. On 17 October, Sarawak recorded 4 new positive case where all cases were admitted at Sarawak General Hospital bringing the total positive cases to 763. 4 new recoveries recorded where all cases recorded in Sarawak General Hospital making the total recoveries in the state to 700. On 18 October, Sarawak recorded 5 new positive case where all cases were admitted at Sarawak General Hospital bringing the total positive cases to 768. One new recoveries recorded where the case recorded in Sibu Hospital making the total recoveries in the state to 701.

On 19 October, no positive cases recorded in the state bringing the total positive cases remain 768. 2 new recoveries recorded where one case recorded in Sibu Hospital and Miri Hospital respectively making the total recoveries in the state to 703. On 20 October, Sarawak recorded one new positive case where the case were admitted at Sarawak General Hospital bringing the total positive cases to 769. 2 new recoveries recorded where all cases recorded in Sarawak General Hospital making the total recoveries in the state to 705. On 21 October, no positive cases recorded in the state bringing the total positive cases remain 769. 4 new recoveries recorded where all cases recorded in Sarawak General Hospital making the total recoveries in the state to 709.

On 22 October, Sarawak recorded one new positive case where the case were admitted at Sarawak General Hospital bringing the total positive cases to 770. 9 new recoveries recorded where all cases recorded in Sarawak General Hospital making the total recoveries in the state to 718. On 23 October, Sarawak recorded 2 new positive case where all cases were admitted at Sarawak General Hospital bringing the total positive cases to 772. 3 new recoveries recorded where 2 cases recorded in Bintulu Hospital and one at Sarawak General Hospital making the total recoveries in the state to 721. On 24 October, Sarawak recorded 8 new positive case where all cases were admitted at Sarawak General Hospital bringing the total positive cases to 780. 6 new recoveries recorded where 5 cases recorded in Bintulu Hospital and one at Sarawak General Hospital making the total recoveries in the state to 727.

On 25 October, Sarawak recorded 16 new positive case where all cases were admitted at Sarawak General Hospital bringing the total positive cases to 796. One new recoveries recorded where the case recorded in Sarawak General Hospital making the total recoveries in the state to 728. On 26 October, Sarawak recorded 7 new positive case where all cases were admitted at Sarawak General Hospital bringing the total positive cases to 803. 4 new recoveries recorded where all cases recorded in Miri Hospital making the total recoveries in the state to 732. On 27 October, Sarawak recorded 16 new positive case where all cases were admitted at Sarawak General Hospital bringing the total positive cases to 819. 4 new recoveries recorded where 2 cases recorded in Sarawak General Hospital and Miri Hospital respectively making the total recoveries in the state to 736.

On 28 October, Sarawak recorded 27 new positive case where 20 cases were admitted at Sarawak General Hospital, 4 at Miri Hospital, 2 at Sibu Hospital and one at Bintulu Hospital bringing the total positive cases to 846. 2 new recoveries recorded where all cases recorded in Sarawak General Hospital making the total recoveries in the state to 738. On 29 October, Sarawak recorded 10 new positive case where all cases were admitted at Sarawak General Hospital bringing the total positive cases to 856. 5 new recoveries recorded where 4 cases recorded in Sarawak General Hospital and one at Miri Hospital making the total recoveries in the state to 743. On 30 October, Sarawak recorded 16 new positive case where 8 cases were admitted at Sarawak General Hospital and Miri Hospital respectively bringing the total positive cases to 872. 5 new recoveries recorded where all cases recorded in Sarawak General Hospital making the total recoveries in the state to 748. On 31 October, Sarawak recorded 9 new positive case where 7 cases were admitted at Sarawak General Hospital and 2 at Miri Hospital bringing the total positive cases to 881. No new recoveries recorded in the state bringing the total recoveries cases remain 748.

==== November 2020 ====
On 1 November, Sarawak recorded 11 new positive case where 6 cases were admitted at Sarawak General Hospital, 3 at Miri Hospital and 2 at Bintulu Hospital bringing the total positive cases to 892. 5 new recoveries recorded where all cases recorded in Sarawak General Hospital making the total recoveries in the state to 753. On 2 November, Sarawak recorded 14 new positive case where all cases were admitted at Sarawak General Hospital bringing the total positive cases to 906. 8 new recoveries recorded where all cases recorded in Sarawak General Hospital making the total recoveries in the state to 761. On 3 November, Sarawak recorded 21 new positive case where 15 cases were admitted at Sarawak General Hospital and 4 at Miri Hospital bringing the total positive cases to 927. 2 new recoveries recorded where all cases recorded in Sarawak General Hospital making the total recoveries in the state to 763.

On 4 November, Sarawak recorded 9 new positive case where 8 cases were admitted at Sarawak General Hospital and one at Miri Hospital bringing the total positive cases to 936. 14 new recoveries recorded where all cases recorded in Sarawak General Hospital making the total recoveries in the state to 777. On 5 November, Sarawak recorded 6 new positive case where all cases were admitted at Sarawak General Hospital bringing the total positive cases to 942. 12 new recoveries recorded where 11 cases recorded in Sarawak General Hospital and one at Bintulu Hospital making the total recoveries in the state to 789. On 6 November, Sarawak recorded 18 new positive case where 16 cases were admitted at Sarawak General Hospital and 2 at Miri Hospital bringing the total positive cases to 960. 18 new recoveries recorded where all cases recorded in Sarawak General Hospital making the total recoveries in the state to 807.

On 7 November, Sarawak recorded 25 new positive case where all cases were admitted at Sarawak General Hospital bringing the total positive cases to 985. 5 new recoveries recorded where all cases recorded in Sarawak General Hospital making the total recoveries in the state to 812. On 8 November, Sarawak recorded 2 new positive case where one case were admitted at Sarawak General Hospital and Miri Hospital respectively bringing the total positive cases to 987. 7 new recoveries recorded where all cases recorded in Sarawak General Hospital making the total recoveries in the state to 819. On 9 November, Sarawak recorded 4 new positive case where all cases were admitted at Sarawak General Hospital bringing the total positive cases to 991. 9 new recoveries recorded where all cases recorded in Sarawak General Hospital making the total recoveries in the state to 828.

On 10 November, Sarawak recorded 6 new positive case where 5 cases were admitted at Sarawak General Hospital and one at Miri Hospital bringing the total positive cases to 997. 12 new recoveries recorded where all cases recorded in Sarawak General Hospital making the total recoveries in the state to 840. On 11 November, Sarawak recorded 14 new positive case where all cases were admitted at Sarawak General Hospital bringing the total positive cases to 1,011. 20 new recoveries recorded where 12 cases recorded in Sarawak General Hospital, 6 at Miri Hospital and 2 at Bintulu Hospital making the total recoveries in the state to 860. On 12 November, Sarawak recorded 8 new positive case where 7 cases were admitted at Sarawak General Hospital and one at Miri Hospital bringing the total positive cases to 1,019. 22 new recoveries recorded where 16 cases recorded in Sarawak General Hospital and 6 at Miri Hospital making the total recoveries in the state to 882.

On 13 November, Sarawak recorded 13 new positive case where 12 cases were admitted at Sarawak General Hospital and one at Miri Hospital bringing the total positive cases to 1,032. 8 new recoveries recorded where 5 cases recorded in Sarawak General Hospital and 3 at Miri Hospital making the total recoveries in the state to 890. On 14 November, Sarawak recorded 4 new positive case where all cases were admitted at Sarawak General Hospital bringing the total positive cases to 1,036. 18 new recoveries recorded where 17 cases recorded in Sarawak General Hospital and one at Miri Hospital making the total recoveries in the state to 908. On 15 November, Sarawak recorded 4 new positive case where 3 cases were admitted at Sarawak General Hospital and one at Miri Hospital bringing the total positive cases to 1,040. 18 new recoveries recorded where 14 cases recorded in Sarawak General Hospital and 4 at Miri Hospital making the total recoveries in the state to 926.

On 16 November, Sarawak recorded one new positive case where the case were admitted at Miri Hospital bringing the total positive cases to 1,041. 5 new recoveries recorded where all cases recorded in Sarawak General Hospital making the total recoveries in the state to 931. On 17 November, Sarawak recorded one new positive case where the case were admitted at Sarawak General Hospital bringing the total positive cases to 1,042. 2 new recoveries recorded where all cases recorded in Sarawak General Hospital making the total recoveries in the state to 933. On 18 November, Sarawak recorded 3 new positive case where all cases were admitted at Sarawak General Hospital bringing the total positive cases to 1,045. 13 new recoveries recorded where all cases recorded in Sarawak General Hospital making the total recoveries in the state to 946.

On 19 November, Sarawak recorded 8 new positive case where 6 cases were admitted at Sarawak General Hospital and 2 at Miri Hospital bringing the total positive cases to 1,053. 16 new recoveries recorded where 13 cases recorded in Sarawak General Hospital and 3 at Miri Hospital making the total recoveries in the state to 962. On 20 November, Sarawak recorded 2 new positive case where one case were admitted at Sarawak General Hospital and Miri Hospital respectively bringing the total positive cases to 1,055. 9 new recoveries recorded where 7 cases recorded in Sarawak General Hospital and 2 at Miri Hospital making the total recoveries in the state to 971. On 21 November, no positive cases recorded in the state bringing the total positive cases remain 1,055. One new recoveries recorded the case recorded in Sarawak General Hospital making the total recoveries in the state to 972.

On 22 November, no positive cases recorded in the state bringing the total positive cases remain 1,055. 5 new recoveries recorded where 3 cases recorded in Sarawak General Hospital and 2 at Miri Hospital making the total recoveries in the state to 977. On 23 November, no positive cases recorded in the state bringing the total positive cases remain 1,055. 5 new recoveries recorded all cases recorded in Sarawak General Hospital making the total recoveries in the state to 982. On 24 November, Sarawak recorded one new positive case where the case were admitted at Sarawak General Hospital bringing the total positive cases to 1,056. 10 new recoveries recorded where 8 cases recorded in Sarawak General Hospital and 2 at Miri Hospital making the total recoveries in the state to 992.

On 25 November, Sarawak recorded 2 new positive case where all cases were admitted at Sibu Hospital bringing the total positive cases to 1,058. 16 new recoveries recorded where 14 cases recorded in Sarawak General Hospital and 2 at Miri Hospital making the total recoveries in the state to 1,008. On 26 November, Sarawak recorded 4 new positive case where all cases were admitted at Sarawak General Hospital bringing the total positive cases to 1,062. 7 new recoveries recorded where 6 cases recorded in Sarawak General Hospital and one at Miri Hospital making the total recoveries in the state to 1,015. On 27 November, no positive cases recorded in the state bringing the total positive cases remain 1,062. 3 new recoveries recorded all cases recorded in Sarawak General Hospital making the total recoveries in the state to 1,018.

On 28 November, no positive cases recorded in the state bringing the total positive cases remain 1,062. 2 new recoveries recorded all cases recorded in Sarawak General Hospital making the total recoveries in the state to 1,020. On 30 November, Sarawak recorded 2 new positive case where all cases were admitted at Miri Hospital bringing the total positive cases to 1,064. 2 new recoveries recorded all cases recorded in Sarawak General Hospital making the total recoveries in the state to 1,022.

==== December 2020 ====
On 1 December, Sarawak recorded one new positive case where the case were admitted at Sarawak General Hospital bringing the total positive cases to 1,065. 9 new recoveries all cases recorded in Sarawak General Hospital making the total recoveries in the state to 1,031. On 3 December, Sarawak recorded one new positive case where the case were admitted at Sarawak General Hospital and one at Miri Hospital bringing the total positive cases to 1,066. One new recoveries the case recorded in Sarawak General Hospital making the total recoveries in the state to 1,032. On 4 December, Sarawak recorded one new positive case where the case were admitted at Sarawak General Hospital bringing the total positive cases to 1,067. One new recoveries the case recorded in Miri Hospital making the total recoveries in the state to 1,033.

On 5 December, Sarawak recorded one new positive case where the case were admitted at Miri Hospital bringing the total positive cases to 1,068. One new recoveries the case recorded in Sarawak General Hospital making the total recoveries in the state to 1,034. On 7 December, Sarawak recorded 2 new positive case where all cases were admitted at Sarawak General Hospital bringing the total positive cases to 1,070. One new recoveries the case recorded in Sarawak General Hospital making the total recoveries in the state to 1,035. On 8 December, Sarawak recorded 2 new positive case where all cases were admitted at Sarawak General Hospital bringing the total positive cases to 1,072. 2 new recoveries all cases recorded in Sibu Hospital making the total recoveries in the state to 1,037.

On 9 December, no positive cases recorded in the state bringing the total positive cases remain 1,072. 4 new recoveries all cases recorded in Sarawak General Hospital making the total recoveries in the state to 1,041. On 10 December, Sarawak recorded one new positive case where the case were admitted at Sarawak General Hospital bringing the total positive cases to 1,073. No new recoveries recorded in the state bringing the total recoveries cases remain 1,041. On 11 December, Sarawak recorded one new positive case where the case were admitted at Bintulu Hospital bringing the total positive cases to 1,074. 2 new recoveries all cases recorded in Miri Hospital making the total recoveries in the state to 1,043.

On 12 December, Sarawak recorded one new positive case where the case were admitted at Sarawak General Hospital bringing the total positive cases to 1,075. No new recoveries recorded in the state bringing the total recoveries cases remain 1,043. On 13 December, no positive cases recorded in the state bringing the total positive cases remain 1,075. One new recoveries the case recorded in Sarawak General Hospital making the total recoveries in the state to 1,044. On 14 December, no positive cases recorded in the state bringing the total positive cases remain 1,075. One new recoveries the case recorded in Sarawak General Hospital making the total recoveries in the state to 1,045.

On 16 December, no positive cases recorded in the state bringing the total positive cases remain 1,075. One new recoveries the case recorded in Miri Hospital making the total recoveries in the state to 1,046. On 17 December, Sarawak recorded 9 new positive case where 6 cases were admitted at Sibu Hospital and 3 at Sarawak General Hospital bringing the total positive cases to 1,084. No new recoveries recorded in the state bringing the total recoveries cases remain 1,046. On 18 December, Sarawak recorded one new positive case where the case were admitted at Sarawak General Hospital bringing the total positive cases to 1,085. No new recoveries recorded in the state bringing the total recoveries cases remain 1,050.

On 19 December, Sarawak recorded 2 new positive case where one case were admitted at Sibu Hospital and Miri Hospital respectively bringing the total positive cases to 1,087. 2 new recoveries all cases recorded in Sarawak General Hospital making the total recoveries in the state to 1,052. On 20 December, Sarawak recorded 3 new positive case where all cases were admitted at Sarawak General Hospital bringing the total positive cases to 1,090. One new recoveries the case recorded in Sarawak General Hospital making the total recoveries in the state to 1,053. On 21 December, no positive cases recorded in the state bringing the total positive cases remain 1,090. 3 new recoveries 2 cases recorded in Sarawak General Hospital and one at Bintulu Hospital making the total recoveries in the state to 1,056.

On 22 December, no positive cases recorded in the state bringing the total positive cases remain 1,090. 4 new recoveries all cases recorded in Sarawak General Hospital making the total recoveries in the state to 1,060. On 23 December, Sarawak recorded 4 new positive case where 3 cases were admitted at Sarawak General Hospital and one at Miri Hospital bringing the total positive cases to 1,094. No new recoveries recorded in the state bringing the total recoveries cases remain 1,060. On 24 December, Sarawak recorded 2 new positive case where all cases were admitted at Miri Hospital bringing the total positive cases to 1,096. One new recoveries the case recorded in Sarawak General Hospital making the total recoveries in the state to 1,061.

On 25 December, Sarawak recorded 3 new positive case where 2 cases were admitted at Sarawak General Hospital and one at Miri Hospital bringing the total positive cases to 1,099. No new recoveries recorded in the state bringing the total recoveries cases remain 1,061. On 26 December, Sarawak recorded 6 new positive case where 5 cases were admitted at Bintulu Hospital and one at Miri Hospital bringing the total positive cases to 1,105. One new recoveries the case recorded in Sarawak General Hospital making the total recoveries in the state to 1,062. On 27 November, Sarawak recorded 3 new positive case where all cases were admitted at Sarawak General Hospital bringing the total positive cases to 1,108. No new recoveries recorded in the state bringing the total recoveries cases remain 1,062.

On 28 November, Sarawak recorded 2 new positive case where all cases were admitted at Sarawak General Hospital bringing the total positive cases to 1,110. No new recoveries recorded in the state bringing the total recoveries cases remain 1,062. On 29 November, Sarawak recorded 4 new positive case where 2 cases were admitted at Sarawak General Hospital and Sibu Hospital respectively bringing the total positive cases to 1,114. 2 new recoveries one case recorded in Sarawak General Hospital and Miri Hospital respectively making the total recoveries in the state to 1,064. On 30 November, Sarawak recorded one new positive case where the case were admitted at Sibu Hospital bringing the total positive cases to 1,115. 4 new recoveries 2 cases recorded in Sarawak General Hospital and Sibu Hospital respectively making the total recoveries in the state to 1,068. On 31 December, Sarawak recorded 2 new positive case where all cases were admitted at Miri Hospital bringing the total positive cases to 1,117. One new recoveries the case recorded in Sarawak General Hospital making the total recoveries in the state to 1,069.

=== Fourth wave ===
==== January 2021 ====
On 1 January, Sarawak recorded 8 new positive case where 3 cases were admitted at Sarawak General Hospital and Sibu Hospital respectively, and one case at Sungai Buloh Hospital and Miri Hospital respectively bringing the total positive cases to 1,125. No new recoveries recorded in the state bringing the total recoveries cases remain 1,069. On 2 January, Sarawak recorded 5 new positive case where 4 cases were admitted at Sibu Hospital and one at Bintulu Hospital bringing the total positive cases to 1,130. 2 new recoveries one case recorded in Sibu Hospital and Miri Hospital respectively making the total recoveries in the state to 1,071. On 3 January, Sarawak recorded 10 new positive case where 4 cases were admitted at Miri Hospital, 2 cases at Sarawak General Hospital, Sibu Hospital and Bintulu Hospital respectively bringing the total positive cases to 1,140. No new recoveries recorded in the state bringing the total recoveries cases remain 1,071.

On 4 January, Sarawak recorded 8 new positive case where all cases were admitted at Sarawak General Hospital bringing the total positive cases to 1,148. No new recoveries recorded in the state bringing the total recoveries cases remain 1,071. On 5 January, Sarawak recorded 13 new positive case where 5 cases were admitted at Sarawak General Hospital and Miri Hospital respectively, 2 cases at Bintulu Hospital and one at Sibu Hospital bringing the total positive cases to 1,161. 8 new recoveries 5 cases recorded in Bintulu Hospital, 2 at Sarawak General Hospital and one at Miri Hospital making the total recoveries in the state to 1,079. On 6 January, Sarawak recorded 8 new positive case where 2 cases were admitted at Sarawak General Hospital and Miri Hospital respectively and one at Sibu Hospital bringing the total positive cases to 1,166. 2 new recoveries all cases recorded in Sarawak General Hospital making the total recoveries in the state to 1,081.

On 7 January, Sarawak recorded 14 new positive case where 9 cases were admitted at Sarawak General Hospital, 4 cases at Sibu Hospital and one at Miri Hospital bringing the total positive cases to 1,180. 2 new recoveries one case recorded in Sarawak General Hospital and Miri Hospital respectively making the total recoveries in the state to 1,085. On 8 January, Sarawak recorded 16 new positive case where 11 cases were admitted at Sarawak General Hospital, one at Miri Hospital and Sibu Hospital respectively bringing the total positive cases to 1,196. 5 new recoveries 3 cases recorded in Sarawak General Hospital and 2 at Miri Hospital making the total recoveries in the state to 1,090. On 9 January, Sarawak recorded 55 new positive case where 37 cases were admitted at Sibu Hospital, 15 at Sarawak General Hospital, 2 at Miri Hospital and one at Bintulu Hospital bringing the total positive cases to 1,251. 4 new recoveries 2 cases recorded in Sarawak General Hospital and one at Sibu Hospital and Sungai Buloh Hospital respectively making the total recoveries in the state to 1,094.

On 10 January, Sarawak recorded 24 new positive case where 11 cases were admitted at Sarawak General Hospital, 6 at Sibu Hospital, 5 at Miri Hospital and 2 at Bintulu Hospital bringing the total positive cases to 1,275. 2 new recoveries one case recorded in Sarawak General Hospital and Sibu Hospital respectively making the total recoveries in the state to 1,096. On 11 January, Sarawak recorded 153 new positive case where 95 cases were admitted at Miri Hospital, 43 at Sibu Hospital and 15 at Sarawak General Hospital bringing the total positive cases to 1,428. 4 new recoveries 3 cases recorded in Sarawak General Hospital and one at Bintulu Hospital making the total recoveries in the state to 1,100. On 12 January, Sarawak recorded 146 new positive case where 107 cases were admitted at Sibu Hospital, 21 at Bintulu Hospital, 15 at Miri Hospital and 3 at Sarawak General Hospital bringing the total positive cases to 1,574. 18 new recoveries 7 cases recorded in Sibu Hospital, 6 at Bintulu Hospital and 5 at Sarawak General Hospital making the total recoveries in the state to 1,118.

On 13 January, Sarawak recorded 166 new positive case where 94 cases were admitted at Sibu Hospital, 53 at Miri Hospital, 16 at Sarawak General Hospital and 3 at Bintulu Hospital bringing the total positive cases to 1,740. 4 new recoveries all cases recorded in Miri Hospital making the total recoveries in the state to 1,122. On 14 January, Sarawak recorded 180 new positive case where 153 cases were admitted at Sibu Hospital, 10 at Miri Hospital, 9 at Sarawak General Hospital and 8 at Bintulu Hospital bringing the total positive cases to 1,920. 9 new recoveries 6 cases recorded in Miri Hospital and 3 at Sarawak General Hospital making the total recoveries in the state to 1,131. On 15 January, Sarawak recorded 60 new positive case where 46 cases were admitted at Sibu Hospital, 10 at Miri Hospital and 4 at Sarawak General Hospital bringing the total positive cases to 1,980. 6 new recoveries 3 cases recorded in Sarawak General Hospital, 2 at Miri Hospital and one at Sibu Hospital making the total recoveries in the state to 1,137.

On 16 January, Sarawak recorded 69 new positive case where 40 cases were admitted at Sibu Hospital,15 at Sarawak General Hospital, 10 at Bintulu Hospital and 4 at Miri Hospital bringing the total positive cases to 2,049. 11 new recoveries 7 cases recorded in Sarawak General Hospital and 4 at Sibu Hospital making the total recoveries in the state to 1,148.

==== April 2021 ====
On 16 April, Sarawak reported a record of 960 new cases, the highest reported in a single day in the state.

== Statistics ==
=== Summary ===
Current COVID-19 update in Sarawak
Date	New cases			Cumulative		New recoveries	Total recoveries	New death(s)	Total deaths	Active cases
Date	Local		Import	Local	Import	New recoveries	Total recoveries	New death(s)	Total deaths	Active cases
Date	Malaysian	Non-Malaysian	Import	Local	Import	New recoveries	Total recoveries	New death(s)	Total deaths	Active cases
7 May 2021	N/A	N/A	2	33,687	159	582	27,368	6	201	6,658
7 May 2021	758		2	33,687	159	582	27,368	6	201	6,658
7 May 2021	760			33,477		582	27,368	6	201	6,658

=== Cases by districts ===
Distribution of cases by districts in Sarawak (5 May 2021)
District	New cases	Total cumulative cases	Zone status
Asajaya	0	44	Yellow
Bau	1	197	Red
Belaga	10	126	Red
Beluru	3	474	Red
Betong	6	534	Orange
Bintulu	27	4,864	Red
Bukit Mabong	11	555	Red
Dalat	0	259	Yellow
Daro	0	19	Yellow
Julau	3	473	Red
Kabong	0	32	Yellow
Kanowit	28	855	Red
Kapit	25	1,797	Red
Kuching	33	3,565	Red
Lawas	0	28	Yellow
Limbang	1	66	Yellow
Lubok Antu	1	43	Yellow
Lundu	10	177	Red
Marudi	0	70	Yellow
Matu	0	141	Orange
Meradong	5	1,045	Red
Miri	15	3,317	Red
Mukah	35	875	Red
Pakan	15	201	Red
Pusa	0	21	Yellow
Samarahan	2	684	Red
Saratok	0	228	Red
Sarikei	1	467	Red
Sebauh	3	201	Red
Selangau	18	507	Red
Serian	17	1,096	Red
Sibu	133	8,018	Red
Simunjan	0	18	Yellow
Song	4	562	Red
Sri Aman	3	711	Red
Subis	0	578	Red
Tanjung Manis	0	62	Orange
Tatau	0	113	Orange
Tebedu	9	56	Orange
Telang Usan	0	7	Yellow
Total	419	33,056	—

=== Clusters ===
==== Ended ====
No.	Cluster name	District(s)	Total cases	Death(s)	Date ended
1	PUI Itali	Kuching	65	5	30 May 2020
2	Petugas Kesihatan Kuching	Kuching	68	0	6 June 2020
3	Persidangan Gereja	Kuching, Samarahan & Serian	191	3	23 June 2020
4	Kidurong	Bintulu	8	0	20 July 2020
5	Tapak Pembinaan Kuching	Kuching	3	0	22 July 2020
6	Pusat Perubatan Kuching	Kuching	3	0	13 August 2020
7	Jupiter	Bintulu	3	0	13 August 2020
8	Jeti Kuching	Kuching	2	0	16 August 2020
9	Pasar Stutong	Kuching	7	0	20 August 2020
10	Syarikat Pembinaan Kuching	Kuching	2	0	22 August 2020
11	Sentosa	Kuching, Bau, Samarahan & Serian	31	0	25 August 2020
12	Kejuruteraan Kuching	Kuching	8	0	25 August 2020
13	Satok	Kuching	4	0	25 August 2020
14	PUI Melbourne	Kuching	3	0	25 August 2020
15	Mambong	Kuching & Samarahan	7	0	26 August 2020
16	Alam	Bintulu	8	0	26 September 2020
17	Putra	Bintulu	5	0	8 November 2020
18	Bah Arnab	Kuching	12	0	15 November 2020
19	Baki	Kuching	46	0	5 December 2020
20	Seladah	Kuching & Serian	9	0	5 December 2020
21	Abell	Kuching	15	0	12 December 2020
22	Wisma Saberkas	Kuching & Samarahan	44	0	13 December 2020
23	Greenhill	Kuching, Miri & Bintulu	91	0	14 December 2020
24	Besi Demak	Kuching	12	0	19 December 2020
25	Mador	Meradong & Sibu	8	0	30 January 2021
26	Keranji Tabuan	Kuching & Miri	15	0	16 February 2021
27	Stutong	Kuching	41	0	22 February 2021
28	Bah Sayap	Miri	96	0	23 February 2021
29	Bedayan	Kuching & Samarahan	17	0	1 March 2021
30	Bukit Sekubong	Bintulu & Sebauh	33	0	3 March 2021
31	Indah Riang	Kuching, Simunjan, Samarahan & Saratok	21	1	7 March 2021
32	Jelita	Miri & Kuching	56	0	7 March 2021
33	Jalan Pengiran	Matu	24	0	11 March 2021
34	Bintang Daily	Meradong	10	0	12 March 2021
35	Tabong	Bau & Samarahan	35	0	15 March 2021
36	Sebangkoi	Sri Aman	34	0	21 March 2021
37	Jun Heng	Bintulu	35	0	22 March 2021
38	Nanga Lijan	Julau	61	0	23 March 2021
39	Univista	Kuching	61	0	23 March 2021
40	Kidurong Dua	Bintulu	14	1	23 March 2021
41	Jalan Geronggang	Sibu	43	3	24 March 2021
42	Kejatau	Sri Aman	20	0	28 March 2021
43	Jan Yong	Kapit	24	0	28 March 2021
44	Seruas	Beluru	83	0	28 March 2021
45	Rakut	Miri, Bintulu, Julau, Kuching, Subis, Beluru & Telang Usan	188	0	28 March 2021
46	Jalan Ho Pin	Samarahan, Kuching & Serian	18	0	4 April 2021
47	Melor	Pusa	15	0	11 April 2021
48	Kampung Sungai Maong	Kuching	54	0	11 April 2021
49	Buloh	Selangau	37	1	13 April 2021
50	Pasai	Sibu, Mukah, Miri, Sri Aman, Kanowit, Kapit, Simunjan, Dalat, Bintulu, Kuching, Julau, Sarikei, Selangau, Beluru, Betong, Belaga, Subis, Song, Lundu, Sebauh & Bukit Mabong	2,693	25	13 April 2021
51	Jalan Main Bazaar	Sri Aman	15	0	14 April 2021
52	Bukit Tunggal	Julau	49	1	15 April 2021
53	Kiba	Sibu	50	1	15 April 2021
54	Buloh Pasi	Meradong	22	0	18 April 2021
55	Sena	Miri, Subis & Lawas	86	0	18 April 2021
56	Jalan Green	Kuching	33	0	18 April 2021
57	Sungai Bakong	Meradong	207	0	18 April 2021
58	Nanga Bulo	Julau	40	0	20 April 2021
59	Jalan Awang	Sibu	60	0	20 April 2021
60	Sungai Atap	Meradong	23	0	24 April 2021
61	Begalak	Sibu & Song	72	0	24 April 2021
62	Jalan Tanjung Kidurong	Bintulu	63	0	1 May 2021
63	Jalan Tanjung	Bintulu	71	0	1 May 2021
64	Jalan Merpati	Miri & Sibu	133	0	1 May 2021
65	Rajang	Sarikei, Tanjung Manis & Kuching	40	2	1 May 2021
66	Sungai Mupong	Sibu & Meradong	18	0	2 May 2021
67	Tanjung Genting	Meradong, Sarikei, Sibu & Julau	123	0	3 May 2021
68	Jalan Kampung Hilir	Sibu & Bintulu	62	0	5 May 2021
69	Taman Vistagro	Sri Aman	25	0	5 May 2021
70	Jalan Muhibbah	Betong & Sri Aman	370	2	5 May 2021
71	Gelong	Kapit, Bukit Mabong & Sibu	296	0	7 May 2021

=== Active ===
Cluster name	District(s)	Total cases	Death(s)	Cluster category
Jalan Gridbid	Miri & Beluru	57	0	Community
Kampung Baru Hilir	Samarahan, Tebedu, Kuching & Serian	115	0	Community
Lorong Desa Senadin	Miri, Mukah & Subis	49	0	Workplace
Depot Imigresen Semuja	Serian	447	0	Detention center
Jalan Badarudin	Kuching	19	0	Workplace
Jalan Bangunan Kerajaan	Beluru & Miri	51	1	Workplace
Jalan Kingsway	Miri & Marudi	93	0	Workplace
Sungai Rassau	Sibu & Matu	17	0	Community
Batu Gong	Serian	109	0	Community
Jalan Sultan Iskandar	Bintulu	27	0	Workplace
Jalan Sanyan	Sibu	146	0	Workplace
Jepak	Bintulu	57	0	Community
Emperoh Jambu	Kuching, Samarahan, Bau, Serian, Asajaya & Saratok	376	0	Community
Chupak	Serian & Samarahan	125	0	Community
Sungai Selitut	Bintulu & Tatau	19	0	Community
Tembok Sri Aman	Sri Aman & Saratok	381	0	Detention center
Bulatan Aman	Sibu	225	0	Workplace
Taman Mesra Bako	Kuching & Samarahan	64	0	Community
Jalan Baji	Sarikei, Miri & Tanjung Manis	102	0	Community
Nanga Kelangas	Julau	40	0	Community
Jalan Puncak Borneo	Kuching & Samarahan	488	0	Workplace
Jalan Bintulu Sibu	Tatau & Bintulu	23	0	School/educational institution
Kampung Binyu	Kuching, Bintulu, Samarahan, Simunjan, Asajaya, Bau & Kabong	166	0	Community
Sungai Rian	Meradong & Sarikei	59	0	Community
Sungai Lemayong	Meradong & Sarikei	77	0	Community
Ulu Balingian	Selangau	105	0	School/educational institution
Jalan Ding Lik Kwong	Sibu	33	1	Workplace
Sungai Duan	Mukah	277	1	Community
Pondok Belaga	Belaga	9	0	Workplace
Sungai Senibung	Julau	14	0	School/educational institution
Putai	Kapit & Bukit Mabong	313	0	Workplace
Pujut Satu	Miri	28	0	Workplace
Sungai Banus	Selangau & Sibu	47	0	Community
Jalan Bambangan	Mukah & Dalat	274	0	School/educational institution
Sungai Passin	Matu & Sibu	59	0	Community
Jalan Kapitan	Marudi	35	0	Community
Jalan Sebauh-Bintulu	Sebauh & Bintulu	73	0	Community
Ulu Strass	Meradong	25	1	Community
Sungai Kawi	Meradong, Sibu, Kabong & Sarikei	234	0	Community
Tabuan Jaya	Kuching, Serian & Samarahan	23	0	School/educational institution
Jalan Maju	Sibu & Kanowit	93	0	Workplace
Duranda Emas	Serian & Kuching	60	0	Community
Tarat Tani	Serian & Samarahan	49	0	Community
Disso	Saratok & Betong	92	1	Community
Kampung Tengah Betong	Betong	22	0	Community
Jalan Selirik	Kapit	139	0	School/educational institution
Jalan Agama	Miri	38	0	School/educational institution
Air Padang	Miri & Kuching	19	0	Workplace
Jalan Disa	Sibu	119	0	School/educational institution
Sungai Ranan	Kanowit	94	0	Community
Sungai Tuah	Kanowit	39	0	Community
Sungai Ngungun	Kanowit	28	0	Community
Abak Bon	Subis & Miri	214	1	Community
Nanga Tajam	Selangau & Sibu	65	0	Community
Sungai Gemuan	Meradong	91	2	Community
Rayang	Serian	81	0	Community
Jalan Roban Lama	Saratok, Betong & Kabong	78	0	School/educational institution
Melugu	Sri Aman & Lubok Antu	89	0	School/educational institution
Sileng Dayak	Lundu & Kuching	82	0	Community
Long Jegan	Beluru & Miri	67	0	School/educational institution
Sungai Nirai	Selangau	51	0	Community
Durin	Bau	9	0	Community
Sungai Sebemban	Bintulu	21	0	Community
Sungai Tengah	Kuching & Bau	38	0	Community
Sebujok	Betong, Sri Aman, Lubok Antu	23	0	Community
Sains Bakam	Miri	26	0	School/educational institution
Batu 25	Bintulu & Sebauh	98	0	Community
Bungey	Betong	25	0	Community
Jalan Sawit	Sarikei	27	0	Workplace
Tanjung Kibong	Sibu	35	0	Workplace
Sungai Mas	Bintulu	53	0	Community
Mongkos	Kuching & Tebedu	30	0	Community
Blok D Jalan Pending	Kuching, Bau, Sibu & Samarahan	54	0	Workplace
Penurin	Betong & Kuching	23	0	Community
Jalan Limbang	Miri	18	0	Religious
Beladin	Pusa	46	0	Religious

=== Charts ===
Total confirmed cases Active cases Recoveries Deaths

New cases

Active cases

== Preventive measures by state government ==
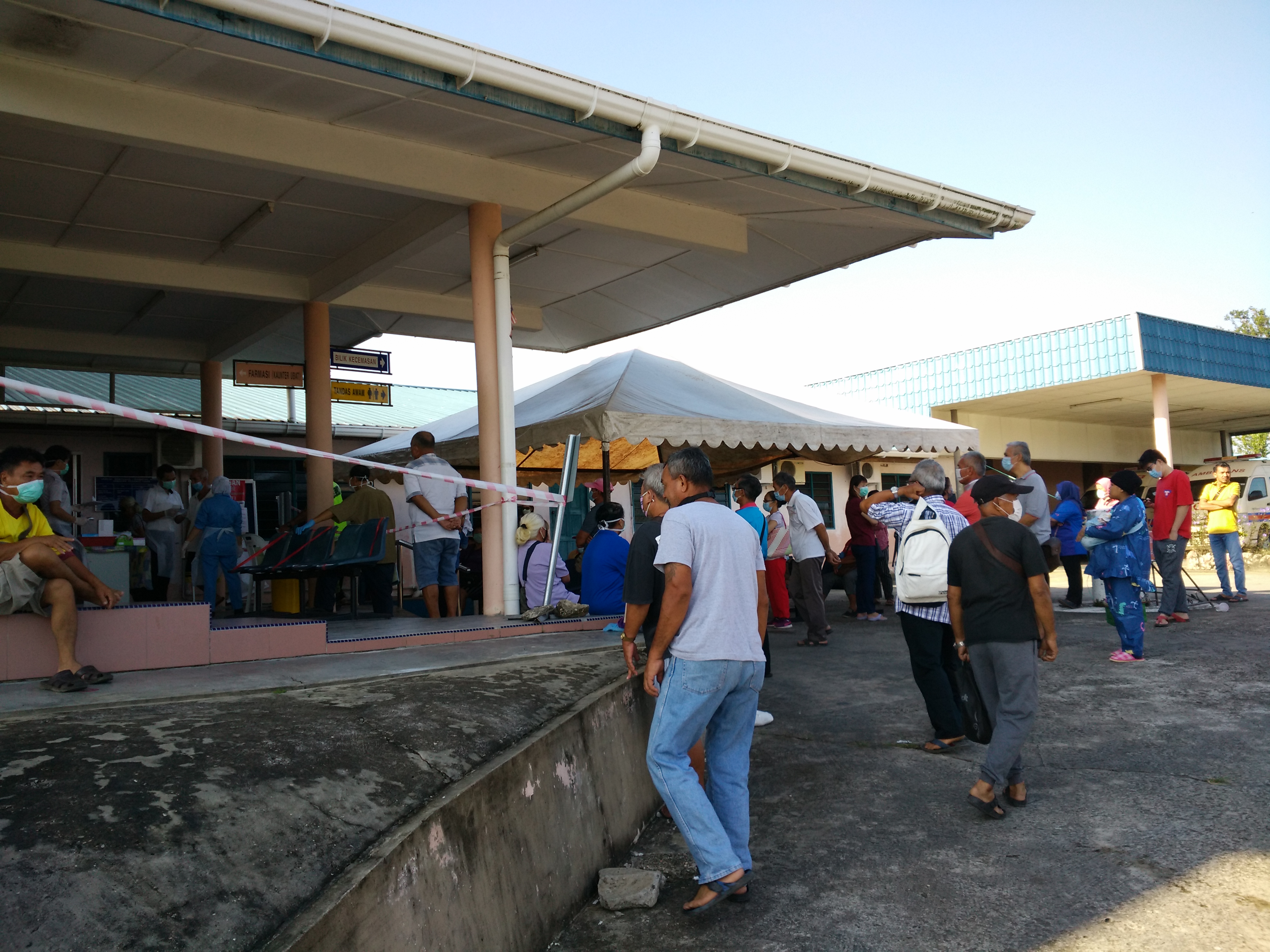
Fever screening counter at Bintangor clinic.

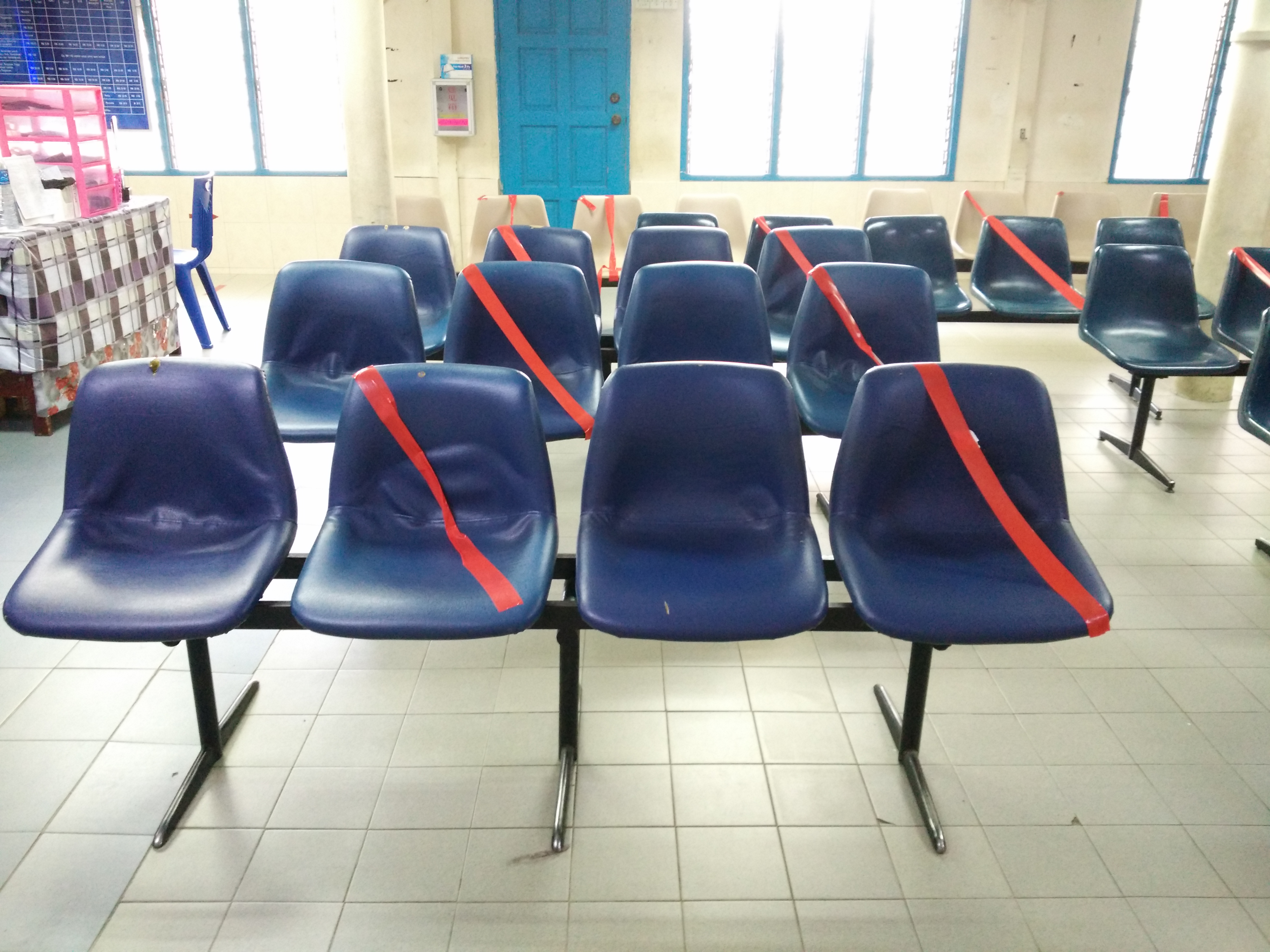
Interspacing seats in Bintangor clinic.

=== Movement control orders ===
==== Phase 1 (18 March - 31 March) ====
On 16 March, Sarawak Chief Minister Datuk Patinggi Abang Johari Tun Openg announced several control measures to prevent COVID-19 infections from further escalating in the state. Among the several control measures imposed are:

1. All schools in Sarawak have been advised to extend their holidays for another week until 29 March 2020.
2. All preschools, kindergartens and tahfiz schools state-wide are instructed to close for two weeks effective 17 March 2020.
3. Higher education institutions, both government and private, are to defer their new academic session by two weeks, effective 17 March 2020.
4. All state government official functions involving more than 50 people will be cancelled or postponed until further notice.
5. All visitors (foreign and domestic) coming into Sarawak and returning Sarawakians will be issued with a 14-day Stay Home Notice (SHN). This includes Sarawak residents, and long-term and short-term pass holders. This will take effect on 18 March 2020.
6. The relevant agencies will monitor the Stay Home Notice holders through random visits, phone calls and modern technology applications.
7. Exemptions will only be given by the state Health Department to those required to travel under special circumstances, such as official and business duties.
8. Everyone is advised to practice the highest standard of personal hygiene and to strictly practice social distancing.

On 18 March, The Sarawak government has advised all government offices (except essential services), business premises (except business premises dealing with daily essentials) and factories (except those in Samalaju, Hi-Tech Samajaya, and plywood factories which are allowed to operate with minimum staffs) will be closed. Restaurant and eateries are allowed to open and operate for takeaways only (drinking/dining in the premises are prohibited). People are allowed to leave houses, but for purchasing essential items, important goods and services only.

On 19 March, Sarawak Government and Housing Ministry orders all food premises and stalls to close by 8PM (UTC+8) daily throughout the movement control order period.

On 20 March, All fast food outlets (including drive thru services) and supermarkets will stop operation by 8PM (UTC+8) but convenience store and petrol station will operate as usual.

On 22 March, The Sarawak Disaster Management Committee said all hypermarkets, supermarkets, markets, coffee shops, private clinics, restaurants, 24-hour convenience stores and petrol stations in the state are to cease operations from 7PM to 7AM (UTC+8) starting from 24 March 2020.

On 25 March, State Disaster Management Committee in a meeting agreed to allow pet shops and veterinary clinics to operate business throughout Movement Control Order (MCO) period from 7AM to 7PM with immediate effect.

On 26 March, Sarawak Chief Minister Datuk Patinggi Abang Johari Tun Openg has issued directives to ensures there is continuous supply of food:

1. Farmers, breeders and fishermen can continue with their daily routines.
2. Farmers, breeders and fishermen are allowed to sell their products at places agreed by the local council from 7AM - 7PM (UTC+8).

On 29 March, Sarawak has imposed a ban on inter-district travel, and those with valid reasons for travelling must obtain permits from the district office.

==== Phase 2 (1 April - 14 April) ====
On 5 April, All hardware shops, agricultural supply stores and spare parts shops are allowed to open twice a week, Tuesday and Thursday from 7AM - 7PM (UTC+8).

On 13 April, All barber shops are not allowed to open despite extension of nationwide Movement Control Order.

==== Phase 3 (15 April - 28 April) ====
On 18 April, State Disaster Management Committee said all farmers and their wives are allowed to travel in the same vehicle or motorcycle to go to their farms despite 1 person per vehicle rule during Movement Control Order. Telecommunication companies such as Celcom, Digi, Maxis and U Mobile and their dealers are allowed to reopen their business operations on Wednesday and Friday from 10AM - 4PM (UTC+8) with only 3 workers maximum at any given time as they are considered as providing essential services to the public. However, they can only operate from selected premises.

On 21 April, Baking specialty stores selling baking ingredients, accessories and containers, are allowed to operate twice a week, Wednesday and Friday from 7AM - 7PM (UTC+8) in view of upcoming Gawai and Hari Raya. All laundry shops (serviced and self-service) are not allowed to operate during MCO.

On 23 April, State Disaster Management Committee said all individual food vendors, hotels, restaurants and fast food restaurants were allowed to operate for takeaways via e-Bazaar Ramadhan from 7AM - 7PM (UTC+8) throughout Ramadan. Food trucks are not allowed to operate during MCO.

==== Phase 4 (29 April - 3 May) ====
On 30 April, Sarawak has decided to allow 2 immediate family members from the same household to travel in a vehicle with immediate effect for purposes of seeking healthcare and medical services, or to buy food, medicine, daily necessities, dietary supplements or any other goods from any provider of essential services.

On 2 May, Sarawak has decided not to implement the Conditional Movement Control Order (CMCO) that will allow the reopening of certain economic activities and sectors this May 4 as announced by Prime Minister Tan Sri Muhyiddin Yassin.

==== Phase 5 (4 May - 12 May) ====
On 9 May, Sarawak will allow various economic activities to reopen on May 12 with strict compliance to standard operating procedures (SOP).

On 12 May, Sarawak Deputy Chief Minister Datuk Amar Douglas Uggah said business in Sarawak are allowed to open between 7AM - 10PM (UTC+8) during the Conditional Movement Control Order (CMCO) period.

==== Phase 6 (13 May - 9 June) ====
On 14 May, Sarawak gazetted the Protection of Public Health Ordinance, which will be in effect from 14 May to June 9, in a bid to further contain the spread of COVID-19.

On 4 June, All barber shops and hair salons are allowed to operate starting 9 June 2020 but only haircuts service. Nature Reserves such as Samajaya, Bukit Lima, Bukit Sembiling and Piasau will be opened from 8 June 2020 following the drawn up SOP.

==== Recovery Movement Control Order (10 June - 31 March) ====
On 12 June, All sports centres and beauty salons are allowed to resume operations. starting 17 June.

On 15 June, All 24-hour operations such as fuel stations, 7-Eleven, KFC, McDonald's, and 24-hour restaurants are allowed to operate, however must abide by the guidelines and SOP. Religious activities are allowed starting 20 June as house of worship (for non-Muslim) is ready to reopen.

On 17 June, Sarawak will allow express and stage buses to operate at full capacity in the state. School bus and vans are permitted to resume operation at full capacity as schools will be reopen on 24 June. Licensed gambling operators are also allowed to resume operation starting 19 June. Day, night markets and weekend markets are allowed to operate as well starting 20 June.

On 28 June, Deputy Chief Minister Datuk Amar Douglas Uggah announced that the Sarawak Disaster Management Committee would be conducting random tests on construction workers in cities beginning nextweek in response to a spate of cases among construction sites. Besides COVID-19, they would also be testing for rabies and dengue fever as well.

On 1 July, Sarawak Disaster Management Committee has decided to allow cinemas to operate starting 1 July.

On 14 July, Schools in three district (Kuching, Kota Samarahan and Padawan) will reopen on 3 August instead of 15 July as announced by Ministry of Education due to concerns over an increase in COVID-19 cases in the area. The grades affected are transition classes (Forms 1 to 4 and Lower Six, and Primary 1 to 6) while sessions for (Pre-school, Form 5 and Upper Six) classes will continue as normal.

On 24 July, Inter-division travel between Kuching and Kota Samarahan are discouraged due to sudden increase in positive cases in the area, except those on official duty, essential services worker and dealing with matters related to death of close family members, sick relative or to seek medical attention. Wearing face masks in public space in Sarawak will be compulsory starting 1 August.

On 27 July, Senior Minister Ismail Sabri Yaakob announced that the Malaysian government will limit inter-zone movement in Sarawak between 1 and 14 August in an effort to curb the spread of COVID-19 within the state, particularly around the state capital Kuching. Sarawak Disaster Management Committee has decided that registration for new students and senior students via face-to-face study session of June 2020 will be postponed to a later date. Flight frequency from Peninsular Malaysia, Sabah and Labuan including return flight will be reduced. All business operating hours in Kuching, Kota Samarahan and Serian will be limited between 6AM - 10PM (UTC+8), all changes will be effective from 1 until 14 August.

On 29 July, Postponement of schools session in three district (Kuching, Kota Samarahan and Padawan) has been extended until 17 August.

On 3 September, Sarawak Disaster Management Committee (SDMC) announced that all swimming pool activities are allowed to resume operation and all entertainment outlets are allowed to resume operation up until 12AM (UTC+8), effective 4 September 2020.

On 4 September, Sarawak Disaster Management Committee (SDMC) announced that children of the age 12 years old and below are not encouraged to enter night market area and cinema hall (including adult of the age 60 years old and above).

On 18 September, Sarawak Disaster Management Committee (SDMC) announced that baby spas, horse racing and Sport and Recreational Centres under the jurisdiction of Kuching South City Hall are allowed to operate subjected to the SOP outlined by Ministry of Local Government and Housing (MLGH).

On 5 October, all IPTA/IPTS students from Peninsular Malaysia, Sabah and Labuan who have registered at IPTA/IPTS in Sarawak must undergo COVID-19 screening at nearest Health Clinics.

On 27 October, all entertainment and reflexology centres are temporary closed effective 28 October 2020.

On 28 October, Sarawak Disaster Management Committee (SDMC) announced that all food outlet and bistro in Kuching District are only allowed to operate from 6AM to 10PM (UTC+8) effective 29 October 2020. All fitness centres and gymnasiums in Kuching District are required to close operation immediately.

On 8 November, the Ministry of Education announced that all schools in Sarawak will be closed from 9 November until the last day of school of 2020 on 18 December.

On 16 November, all tuition centres and kindergartens in green zones are allowed to resume operation starting 17 November 2020.

On 6 December, the Sarawak Disaster Management Committee (SDMC) announced that spas, wellness and reflexology centres in the state can resume operations effective from 7 December due to the easing of the existing Conditional Movement Control Order (CMCO) lockdown.

===== Enhanced Movement Control Order - Kampung Haji Baki (28 October - 12 November) =====
On 27 October, Sarawak Disaster Management Committee (SDMC) announced that Enhanced Movement Control Order (EMCO) will be implemented at Kampung Haji Baki involving Kampung Haji Baki Block A, Kampung Haji Baki Block B and Kampung Haji Baki Block C from 28 October to 10 November.

On 10 November, Sarawak Disaster Management Committee (SDMC) announced that Enhanced Movement Control Order (EMCO) at Kampung Haji Baki will be extended for another 7 days until 17 November 2020.

On 12 November, Sarawak Disaster Management Committee (SDMC) announced that Enhanced Movement Control Order (EMCO) at Kampung Haji Baki has ended.

===== Conditional Movement Control Order - Kuching (9 November - 27 November) =====
On 7 November, Sarawak Disaster Management Committee (SDMC) announced that Conditional Movement Control Order (CMCO) will be implemented in Kuching Division from 9 November to 22 November (14 days) after the division recorded 151 positive COVID-19 cases in the past 14 days. Inter-state travel to Peninsular Malaysia, Sabah and Labuan are not allowed while inter-division travel in Sarawak are allowed except entry and exit to or from Kuching Division.

On 22 November, Sarawak Disaster Management Committee (SDMC) announced that Conditional Movement Control Order (CMCO) in Kuching Division will be extended until 27 November.

===== Conditional Movement Control Order - Kuching and Miri (13 January - 17 January) =====
On 11 January, Sarawak Disaster Management Committee (SDMC) announced that Conditional Movement Control Order (CMCO) will be implemented in Kuching, Sibu and Miri from 13 January to 26 January (14 days) after these divisions recorded rapid increase of positive COVID-19 cases. Inter-state and inter-district travel is not allowed unless permitted by the Royal Malaysia Police.

On 14 January, Movement Control Order will be implemented in Sibu Zone except Sarikei District starting 16 January.

On 16 January, Sarawak Disaster Management Committee (SDMC) announced that Conditional Movement Control Order will be expanded to all divisions in Sarawak except Sibu Zone.

==== Conditional Movement Control Order (18 January - 31 January) ====
On 16 January, Sarawak Disaster Management Committee (SDMC) announced that Conditional Movement Control Order (CMCO) will be implemented throughout Sarawak except Sibu Zone starting 18 January until 31 January (14 days). With school session to begin on 20 January, SDMC announced that only students siting for examination for 2020 and 2021 will have in-person school session while students in preschools, primary schools, secondary schools (Form 1 to Form 4), and Semester 2 SVM and DVM Year 2020 at Vocational College in Sarawak will learn through Teaching and Learning at Home method.

===== Movement Control Order - Sibu (16 January - 29 January) =====
On 14 January, Sarawak Disaster Management Committee (SDMC) announced that Movement Control Order (MCO) will be implemented in Sibu Zone including Sibu District, Kanowit District and Selangau District (except Sarikei District remain under CMCO) from 16 January to 29 January (14 days) after the zone recorded rapid increase of positive COVID-19 cases.

=== Travels alert and quarantine arrangements ===
The following warnings and quarantine arrangements for inbound and outbound travel to the state are for both foreigners and Malaysian including Sarawakians:

Alert level	Country	Date of enforcement	Status	Note
Prohibit	All nations	18 March 2020	In force	In response to the nationwide Movement Control Order, all foreigners are ban from entering or exiting Malaysian border, whether by air, sea or land.
Prohibit	China	1 February 2020	In force	In response to the 2020 coronavirus pandemic in Mainland China, the state government has refused entry to all Chinese nationals and foreigners who have travelled to China.
Prohibit	South Korea	28 February 2020	In force	In response to the 2020 coronavirus pandemic in South Korea, the state government has refused entry to all South Korean nationals and foreigners who have travelled to South Korea.
Prohibit	Denmark	14 March 2020	In force	In response to the 2020 coronavirus pandemic in Denmark and its recent lockdown, the Malaysian government announced a travel ban to the country.
Prohibit	Iran; Italy	4 March 2020	In force	In response to the 2020 coronavirus pandemic in Iran and Italy, the state government has refused entry to all Iranian and Italian nationals and foreigners who have travelled to one of the countries.
Strongly advised	Brunei; Indonesia; Japan; Singapore	4 March 2020	In force	Visitors and Malaysian that visited Singapore, Brunei, Indonesia and Japan must adhere to precautionary guidelines issued by the state Health Department at all entry points into Sarawak.

On 4 April, all Sarawakians that returns from overseas must undergo a 14-days quarantine upon arrivals at quarantine centres arranged by state government for observation and supervision for COVID-19 infection. On 5 April, State Tourism, Arts and Culture Minister Datuk Abdul Karim Rahman Hamzah said all foreigners were now banned from transiting in Sarawak, whether by air, sea or land. This decision comes into effect immediately.

On 13 June, Senior Minister Datuk Seri Ismail Sabri Yaakob announced that Malaysians from Peninsular Malaysia, Sabah, and Labuan would be allowed to enter Sarawak without having to seek permission from the Sarawak Disaster Management Committee (SDMC).

On 1 July, Deputy Chief Minister Datuk Amar Douglas Uggah announced that foreigners who had been staying continuously in Malaysia for 30 days would be allowed to enter Sarawak without having to undergo quarantine. However, they must get approval from Sarawak Disaster Committee before entering Sarawak.

On 26 July, Malaysians from Peninsular Malaysia, Sabah and Labuan are required to quarantine in designated hotel for 14 days upon arrival into Sarawak effective on 1 August.

On 2 August, No permission are required from police for outbound travel from Sarawak to Peninsular Malaysia, Sabah and Labuan.

On 28 August, Sarawak Disaster Management Committee announced all Malaysian citizens (including Sarawakians) who return from overseas need to undergo a mandatory quarantine of 14 days at selected quarantine station provided by the Sarawak Government. All Malaysian citizens (including Sarawakians) who enter Sarawak from West Malaysia, Sabah and Labuan are allowed in without having to undergo quarantine. However, they are required to fill in the E-Health Declaration Form (E-HDF). COVID-19 test will be done randomly on entries to Sarawak via air, land and sea. All flight operations in-bound and out-bound to Sarawak will resume operation as normal starting 1 September 2020. Kids Recreational Centre located at shopping malls or closed-concept ones are allowed to resume operation starting 1 September 2020.

On 18 September, Sarawak Disaster Management Committee (SDMC) announced that all Malaysian and non-Malaysian citizens entering from or through Sabah will be required to undergo a COVID-19 swab test (rT-PCR test) 3 days before travel and attach the document when filling the online enterSarawak form, effective 21 September 2020. Malaysian citizens that travel from Penang will undergo random COVID-19 test upon arrival, and Sarawakians returning from overseas will be quarantined at first point of entry in Sarawak and are not allowed to transit to their final destination.

On 21 September, all non-Malaysians that wish to enter Sarawak through Kuala Lumpur International Airport (KLIA) will be quarantined in Kuala Lumpur before entering Sarawak.

On 28 September, Sarawak Disaster Management Committee (SDMC) announced that all Sarawakian entering from/through Sabah or Labuan are required to fill in the online enterSarawak form before entering the state. They will undergo 14-days quarantine at home with a wristband given to them. For non-Sarawakians (Malaysian and non-Malaysian), they are required to undergo COVID-19 swab test 3 days before entering Sarawak and attach the test document alongside the enterSarawak form. They will be given a limited 5 days pass in Sarawak and if they failed to attach their COVID-19 test documents, they are not allowed to enter the state. All Malaysians and non-Malaysians are required to declare whether they have been to Sabah or Labuan in the past 14 days before entering Sarawak. They are required to undergo 14-days quarantined at hotel or quarantine center upon arrival.

On 1 October, Sarawak Disaster Management Committee (SDMC) announced that all Malaysians and non-Malaysians from Sabah or Labuan are not allowed to enter Sarawak. Sarawakians from Sabah or Labuan are allowed to enter Sarawak with conditions that they are required to fill the enterSarawak and e-Health Declaration form, and undergo mandatory 14-days quarantine at quarantine centers. These will be effective 4 October 2020.

On 14 December, Sarawak Disaster Management Committee (SDMC) announced that Sarawakians entering from overseas are required to undergo mandatory 10-days quarantine at quarantine centers while non-Sarawakians are required to undergo rT-PCR test at their first point of entry 3 days prior to arrival to Sarawak. Malaysians and non-Malaysians entering from Peninsular Malaysia will undergo mandatory 10-days quarantine at quarantine centres while to those entering from Sabah and Labuan are required to undergo rT-PCR test 3 days prior to their arrival to Sarawak. These restrictions will be effective immediately.

On 11 January, Sarawak Disaster Management Committee (SDMC) announced that all travellers entering Sarawak will undergo mandatory quarantine for 14 days at quarantine centers.

On 14 January, Sarawak Disaster Management Committee (SDMC) announced that all travellers travelling from Peninsular Malaysia, Sabah and Labuan are required to undergo COVID-19 rT-PCR test 3 days (72 hours) prior to their arrival and must attach it together with their enterSarawak form if their test are negative.

=== Prevention for immigration ===
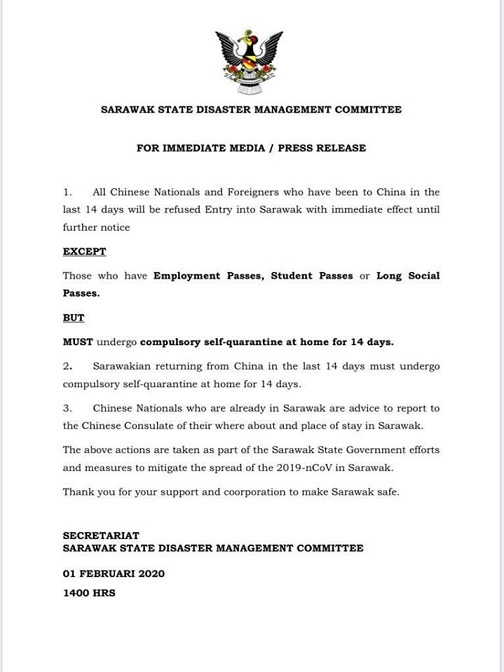
Prohibition dated 1 February 2020 issued by the Government of Sarawak.

On 29 January, all visitors entering Sarawak are required to declare the status of their health as part of efforts to contain COVID-19 infection in the state where they are required to fill in the health declaration form provided at all entry points in the state, including border checkpoints and onboard aircraft. The regulation also applies to visitors driving vehicles who arrive via ferry from Labuan and flight passengers from Mulu National Park as there are direct flights from Kota Kinabalu to the location.

On 21 March, Sarawak Chief Minister Datuk Patinggi Abang Johari Tun Openg said all border posts in Sarawak will be closed with immediate effect to prevent further spread of COVID-19 except Customs, Immigration and Quarantine Complexes (CIQs) between Sarawak and Brunei (Sungai Tujuh, Tedungan, Pandaruan and Mengkalap) would be open from 6 am to 8 pm (UTC+8) while CIQs between Sarawak and Kalimantan (Tebedu, Biawak and Lubok Antu) would be open between 9 am and 3 pm (UTC+8).

On 27 March, Sarawak Disaster Management Committee chairman Datuk Amar Douglas Uggah said border between Sarawak and Brunei will be open from 6 am to 6 pm (UTC+8) effective 28 March 2020.

On 8 July, All visitors crossing Brunei through the border via land will not be required to obtain permission from Sarawak Disaster Committee and police to enter Sarawak except those who slept the night in Brunei or transited in Brunei via flight will need to obtain permission to enter Sarawak.

=== Bans on mass gathering events ===
On 15 March, immediately after the spikes of the cases which related to the religious gathering at Sri Petaling Mosque in Kuala Lumpur on 28 February to 1 March, State Disaster Management Committee in a statement said all government and public gatherings involving the participation of more than 50 people in Sarawak must be postponed to a later date.

On 5 April, Sarawak government announced that Ramadhan and Gawai Bazaar will be canceled in the state to ensure the safety of Sarawakians.

On 24 August, Sarawak Disaster Management Committee has made decision to allow only 50% of venue size capacity for social and official events that involve mass gathering whilst accommodating physical distancing effective 25 August.

On 29 October, the Health Ministry announced that a total of 209 learning institutions in Kuching would be closed from 30 October until 13 November following the designation of the Kuching District as a red zone.

On 18 December, Sarawak Disaster Management Committee (SDMC) announced that Christmas celebration in the state are only permitted for the first day which is 25 December and the maximum attendance capacity are only 20 person at a time and it is limited to family members only.

On 12 January, Sarawak Disaster Management Committee (SDMC) announced that Chinese New Year celebration in the state are only permitted for the first day with attendance limited to 20 persons at a time and only for close family members only.

On 15 January, Sarawak's State Welfare, Community Well-being, Women, Family and Childhood Development Minister Fatimah Abdullah announced that flood relief centres in Sarawak would be operating at 50% capacity to enable social distancing and reduce the risk of COVID-19 infection.

=== Fighting misinformation ===
i-Alerts is one of the Sarawak government's initiatives to keep Sarawakians updated with the COVID-19 situation in Sarawak. More importantly, the official mobile app can help the state combat fake news during this crisis. i-Alerts brings together all disaster-related agencies and units to ensure an always accurate and up-to-date situation updates to ensure Sarawak citizens stay constantly informed and in the know with news and videos. The official app is managed by the State Disaster Management Committee and information on the app is available in three languages namely English, Bahasa Melayu and Mandarin. Sarawakians are advised to download i-Alerts on their mobile devices not just to be kept in the loop of the COVID-19 situation, but to also play an active role in helping to contain the spread of the disease. Android users can download i-Alerts via the Google Play Store while Apple users can do the same via the App Store by searching the name " i-Alerts ".

=== Contact tracing ===
In May 2020, Sarawak government launched two mobile apps to facilitate COVID-19 contract tracing namely "CovidTrace" and "Qmunity". CovidTrace facilitates the collection of information for those who are close contact with Covid positive people. Qmunity helps the business community to get contact details when customers entered the premises.

== Funds and aid on the pandemic ==
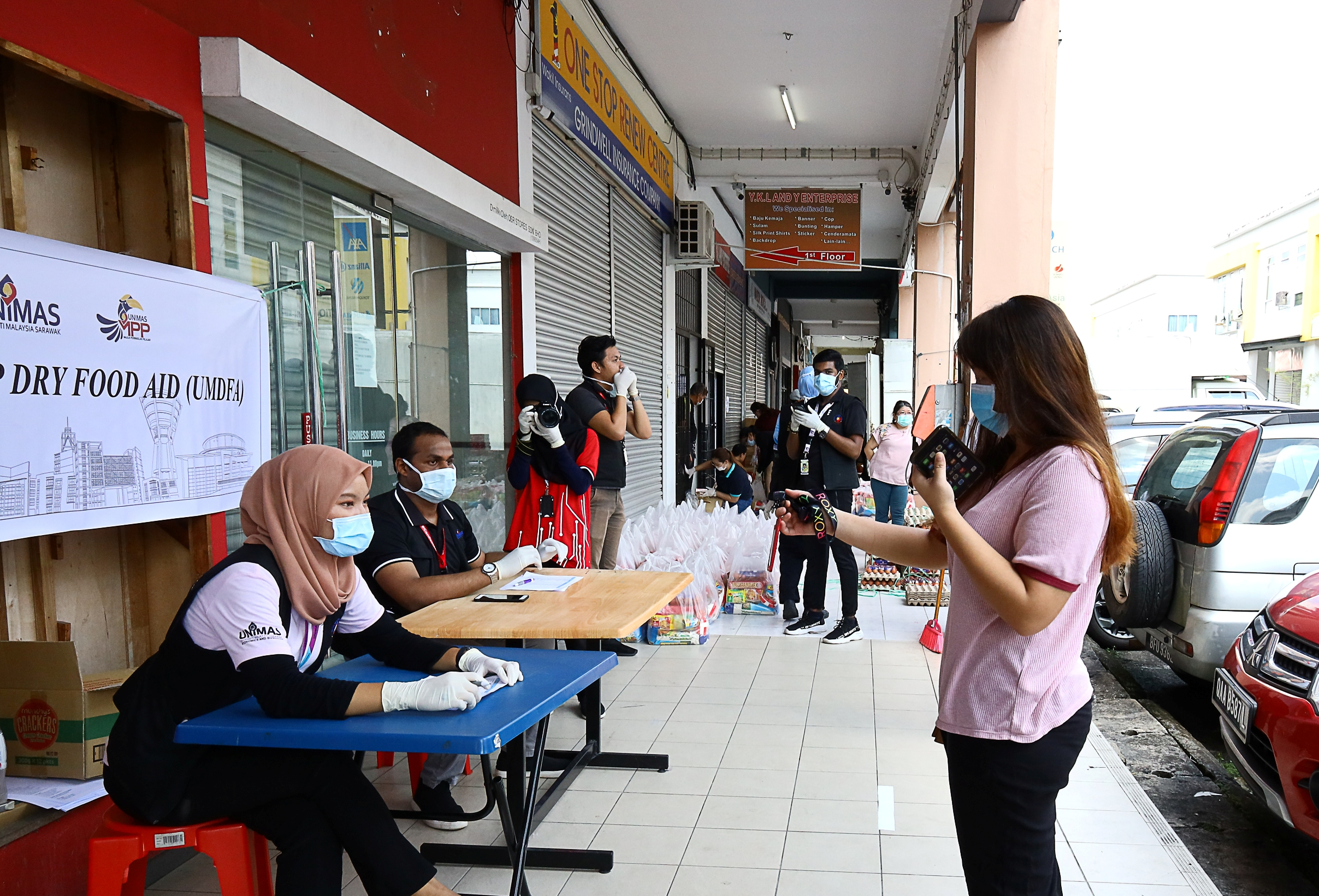
Universiti Malaysia Sarawak (UNIMAS) Student Representative Council (MPP) dry food aid for students staying outside campus on 31 March 2020.

=== Aid from other countries ===
On 26 March, Sarawak has received 20,000 face masks from China's Fujian province. Provincial government of Fujian donated these face masks as a friendship agreement with Sarawak, through the Chinese consulate. Provincial government of Fujian also provided assistance through a video conferencing session between their medical specialists and those in Sarawak. The Shandong provincial government, which is another friendship state with Sarawak, will send more masks through the consulate in the coming week.

=== Local pandemic fund within Sarawak ===
On 23 March, Toh Puan Datuk Patinggi Raghad Kurdi Taib, wife of Yang di-Pertua Negeri Sarawak Tun Pehin Sri Abdul Taib Mahmud, has donated RM60,000 to the Sarawak General Hospital in the battle against the COVID-19 pandemic.

On 25 March, Leading medical/healthcare beds, peripherals and accessories provider LKL International Bhd (LKL International) will supply RM6.6 million worth of Personal Protective Equipment (PPE) to the Sarawak state government for onward distribution to public hospitals under the Sarawak State Health Department and the frontline healthcare personnel in their battle against COVID-19.

On 30 March, Yang di-Pertua Negeri of Sarawak, Tun Pehin Sri Abdul Taib Mahmud donates various equipment and essential items, worth RM120,500 to the Sarawak General Hospital (SGH) today, to help in the treatment of COVID-19 patients. The Governor also donated 700 food packs and mineral water to Sarawak Police Operations Room, to be distributed to police, Armed Forces a well as People's Volunteer Corps (RELA) personnel who are carrying out roadblocks during Movement Control Order (MCO).

Food aids are generally distributed via political parties affiliated with the government with number of beneficiaries and amount of spending publicised. Other details such as sourcing of food aids, food vendors selections, value of food packages, and deliveries were not revealed.

==== State-government assistance package ====
On 23 March, Sarawak Chief Minister Datuk Patinggi Abang Johari Tun Openg announced RM1.15 billion Sarawakku Sayang special aid package including 16 measures to reduce COVID-19 impact on the state:

1. Domestic, Commercial and Industrial consumers given a discount of five per cent to 25 per cent on monthly electricity bill for April until September 2020.
2. Domestic, Commercial and Industrial consumers given discount of 10 per cent to 25 per cent on their monthly water bill for April until September 2020.
3. Sarawakian from the low-income category, the B40 group will be provided a monthly cash pay-out of RM250 for 6-months.
4. Special monthly incentives for frontline personnel involved in COVID-19.
5. Discount of 50 per cent for rental of market and stalls covering a period of six months up to September 2020.
6. Waiver of permits and licenses fees for traders, hawkers, night market traders, Tamu and bazaar Ramadhan operations.
7. Discount of 25 per cent on annual assessment rate above RM400 threshold given to residential, commercial, industrial and special purpose holdings for the year 2020.
8. Deferment of loan repayment for Skim Pinjaman Industri Kecil dan Sederhana (SPIKS).
9. Additional RM20 million for SMEs to expand their business and to sustain their businesses.
10. Discount of 30 per cent for payments of land rents to all land uses for the year 2020.
11. Deferment of land premiums.
12. Sarawak Government have placed an order of two million pieces of face masks to be distributed free to Sarawakians through the State Disaster Management Committee.
13. Providing dedicated support to physicians and practices on the front lines of testing, diagnosing, and treating patients at risk of COVID-19.
14. Providing dedicated supports of food supplies to physicians and practitioners on the front lines of testing, diagnosing, and treating patients at risk of COVID-19.
15. Discount of 50 per cent for rental of HDC Houses rental scheme covering a period of six (6) months up to September 2020.

On 30 March, Sarawak Chief Minister Datuk Patinggi Abang Johari Tun Openg has announced an additional RM16.4 million to the RM1.15 billion Sarawakku Sayang special aid package in food assistance for the poor in rural and urban areas to mitigate the impact of the COVID-19 pandemic in the state. The aid was for those who were homeless and who had lost their jobs to reduce their burden.

On 10 April, Sarawak Chief Minister Datuk Patinggi Abang Johari Tun Openg announced additional RM1.1 billion Sarawakku Sayang Assistance Package 2.0 to assist SMEs including 4 measures:

1. Interest-free soft loan for SMEs.
2. Special grant of RM1,500 to hawkers and petty traders through Sarawak Pay.
3. Abolishment of 2% interest rates to 0% for 3.5 years under micro credit scheme.
4. Waiver for rentals to SMEs in retail sector operating on premises owned by state GLCs

On 8 May, Sarawak Chief Minister Datuk Patinggi Abang Johari Tun Openg announced third economic stimulus package, Sarawakku Sayang Assistance Package 3.0, worth RM300 million to reduce the people's burden following the COVID-19 pandemic, particularly those who had missed out on the two earlier packages. The new package are consisted of seven measures:

1. One-off cash payment of RM500 to 377,806 single Sarawakians aged 21 and above earning less than RM2,000 a month.
2. One-off cash payment of RM500 to each registered "penambang" (river taxi) owner.
3. One-off cash payment of RM600 to 959 licensed van operators, 1,976 taxi drivers and 739 school buses and van operators.
4. Special grant of RM1,500 to 145 tourist guides and 113 park guides.
5. One-off grant of RM1,500 to an estimated 500 members of the media for their contribution in covering the COVID-19 outbreak.

== Vaccination ==
The COVID-19 vaccination programme in Sarawak is currently being implemented by the state government with the help from the federal government as an approach in curbing the spread of virus. The program is currently being implemented in phases from 26 February 2021 and Sarawak's Chief Minister Abang Johari Openg became the first individual in Sarawak to receive the COVID-19 vaccine.

Vaccinated first dose	Vaccinated second dose	As of
194,936	111,176	1 June 2021

== Aftermath ==
A total of 3,641 companies in Sarawak went out of business from 2020 to 2022.

== See also ==
- COVID-19 pandemic in Sabah
- COVID-19 pandemic in Malaysia
