= List of capitals in Malaysia =

Overview of Malaysian national, state, and district capitals

The following is a list of capitals in Malaysia. It describes the national, state, and district capitals of Malaysia.

== National capital ==
The national capital of Malaysia is Kuala Lumpur. It remains the primary cultural, business and financial centre in Malaysia. The Parliament of Malaysia and the official residence of the King are also located in Kuala Lumpur. In 2001, the seat of government was moved from Kuala Lumpur to the planned city of Putrajaya which from then on served as the federal administrative centre, sometimes referred to as the administrative capital. Both these cities, together with Labuan, have special status as Federal Territories of Malaysia.

Article 154(1) of the Federal Constitution states that unless been declared otherwise by the Parliament, Kuala Lumpur shall remain as the federal capital.

== State capitals ==
Each state in Malaysia has its own state capital, where the state administration is carried out by each respective state government that is formed after winning the elections. The three Federal Territories of Malaysia – Kuala Lumpur, Labuan and Putrajaya – are headed by the Yang di-Pertuan Agong and administered by the Department of the Federal Territories under the Prime Minister's Department.

All the states in Peninsular Malaysia, except for Malacca and Penang, are constitutional monarchies. The two and Sabah and Sarawak are non-monarchical states, which are headed by a Yang di-Pertua Negeri (Governors). Thus, those states with constitutional monarchies have royal capitals or seats where the palace or official residences of the monarchs are situated. These capitals are sometimes different from the state's administrative capitals. The Yang di-Pertuan Agong resides in Kuala Lumpur.

States of Malaya	Administrative capital	Royal capital	Historical capital
Johor	Johor Bahru	Muar	Johor Lama (Kota Tinggi)
Kedah	Alor Setar	Anak Bukit	Lembah Bujang
Kelantan	Kota Bharu	Kubang Kerian	Kota Lama
Malacca	Malacca City	-	
Negeri Sembilan	Seremban	Seri Menanti	
Pahang	Kuantan	Pekan	Pekan (1889–1898), Kuala Lipis (1898–1955)
Penang	George Town	-	
Perak	Ipoh	Kuala Kangsar	Teluk Intan (1528–1877), Taiping (1877–1937)
Perlis	Kangar	Arau	
Selangor	Shah Alam	Klang	Kuala Selangor (1743–1827), Jugra (1827–1875), Klang (1875–1880) & (1974–1978), Kuala Lumpur (1880–1974)
Terengganu	Kuala Terengganu	Kuala Terengganu	

Borneo States	Administrative capital	Historical capital
Sabah	Kota Kinabalu	Kudat (1881–1884), Sandakan (1884–1945)
Sarawak	Kuching	

Federal Territories	Administrative capital
Labuan	Victoria

== District capitals ==
Districts	Capital or seat
Johor
Batu Pahat District	Batu Pahat
Johor Bahru District	Johor Bahru
Kluang District	Kluang
Kota Tinggi District	Kota Tinggi
Kulai District	Kulai
Mersing District	Mersing
Muar District	Muar
Pontian District	Pontian Kechil
Segamat District	Segamat
Tangkak District	Tangkak
Kedah
Baling District	Baling
Bandar Baharu District	Serdang
Kota Setar District	Alor Setar
Kuala Muda District	Sungai Petani
Kubang Pasu District	Jitra
Kulim District	Kulim
Langkawi District	Kuah
Padang Terap District	Kuala Nerang
Pendang District	Pendang
Pokok Sena District	Pokok Sena
Sik District	Sik
Yan District	Yan
Kelantan
Bachok District	Bachok
Gua Musang District	Gua Musang
Jeli District	Jeli
Kota Bharu District	Kota Bharu
Kuala Krai District	Kuala Krai
Machang District	Machang
Pasir Mas District	Pasir Mas
Pasir Puteh District	Pasir Puteh
Tanah Merah District	Tanah Merah
Tumpat District	Tumpat
Malacca
Alor Gajah District	Alor Gajah
Jasin District	Jasin
Melaka Tengah District	Ayer Keroh
Negeri Sembilan
Jelebu District	Kuala Klawang
Jempol District	Bandar Seri Jempol
Kuala Pilah District	Kuala Pilah
Port Dickson District	Port Dickson
Rembau District	Rembau
Seremban District	Seremban
Tampin District	Tampin
Pahang
Bentong District	Bentong
Bera District	Bandar Bera
Cameron Highlands District	Tanah Rata
Jerantut District	Jerantut
Kuantan District	Kuantan
Lipis District	Kuala Lipis
Maran District	Maran
Pekan District	Pekan
Raub District	Raub
Rompin District	Kuala Rompin
Temerloh District	Temerloh
Penang
Central Seberang Perai District	Bukit Mertajam
North Seberang Perai District	Kepala Batas
Northeast Penang Island District	Downtown George Town
South Seberang Perai District	Sungai Jawi
Southwest Penang Island District	Balik Pulau
Perak
Batang Padang District	Tapah
Hilir Perak District	Teluk Intan
Hulu Perak District	Gerik
Kampar District	Kampar
Kerian District	Parit Buntar
Kinta District	Batu Gajah
Kuala Kangsar District	Kuala Kangsar
Larut, Matang and Selama District	Taiping
Manjung District	Seri Manjung
Muallim District	Tanjung Malim
Perak Tengah District	Seri Iskandar
Bagan Datuk District	Bagan Datuk
Sabah
Beaufort District	Beaufort
Beluran District	Beluran
Keningau District	Keningau
Kinabatangan District	Kota Kinabatangan
Kota Belud District	Kota Belud
Kota Kinabalu District	Kota Kinabalu
Kota Marudu District	Kota Marudu
Kuala Penyu District	Kuala Penyu
Kudat District	Kudat
Kunak District	Kunak
Lahad Datu District	Lahad Datu
Nabawan District	Nabawan
Papar District	Papar
Penampang District	Donggongon
Pitas District	Pitas
Putatan District	Putatan
Ranau District	Ranau
Sandakan District	Sandakan
Semporna District	Semporna
Sipitang District	Sipitang
Tambunan District	Tambunan
Tawau District	Tawau
Telupid District	Telupid
Tenom District	Tenom
Tongod District	Tongod
Tuaran District	Tuaran
Sarawak
Asajaya District	Asajaya
Bau District	Bau
Belaga District	Belaga
Beluru District	Beluru
Betong District	Betong
Bintulu District	Bintulu
Dalat District	Dalat
Daro District	Matu
Julau District	Julau
Kabong District	Kabong
Kanowit District	Kanowit
Kapit District	Kapit
Kuching District	Kuching
Lawas District	Lawas
Limbang District	Limbang
Lubok Antu District	Lubok Antu
Lundu District	Lundu
Marudi District	Marudi
Matu District	Matu
Meradong District	Bintangor
Miri District	Miri
Mukah District	Mukah
Pakan District	Pakan
Pusa District	Pusa
Samarahan District	Kota Samarahan
Saratok District	Saratok
Sarikei District	Sarikei
Sebauh District	Sebauh
Selangau District	Selangau
Serian District	Serian
Sibu District	Sibu
Simunjan District	Simunjan
Song District	Song
Sri Aman District	Simanggang
Subis District	Subis
Tanjung Manis District	Belawai
Tatau District	Tatau
Tebedu District	Tebedu
Telang Usan District	Long Lama
Selangor
Gombak District	Bandar Baru Selayang
Hulu Langat District	Bandar Baru Bangi
Hulu Selangor District	Kuala Kubu Bharu
Klang District	Klang
Kuala Langat District	Telok Datok
Kuala Selangor District	Kuala Selangor
Petaling District	Subang
Sabak Bernam District	Sabak
Sepang District	Salak Tinggi
Terengganu
Besut District	Kampung Raja
Dungun District	Kuala Dungun
Hulu Terengganu District	Kuala Berang
Kemaman District	Chukai
Kuala Nerus District	Kuala Nerus
Kuala Terengganu District	Kuala Terengganu
Marang District	Marang
Setiu District	Bandar Permaisuri

== See also ==
- List of cities and towns in Malaysia by population
