= Beluru =

Beluru may refer to:

- Belaru, later name for the ship Empire Passmore
- Bēlūru or Belur, Karnatka, India
- Beluru District, Sarawak, Malaysia
