= Meradong =

Meradong may refer to:

- Meradong District
- Meradong (state constituency), represented in the Sarawak State Legislative Assembly
