= Miri Hospital =

Hospital in Miri, Sarawak, Malaysia

Geography
- Location: Jalan Cahaya, Miri, Sarawak, Malaysia
- Coordinates: 4°22′28″N 113°59′56″E

Organisation
- Type: Regional Hospital

Services
- Emergency department: Yes
- Beds: 667

History
- Founded: 1995

Links
- Website: hmiri.moh.gov.my

Miri Hospital is a 349-bedded main secondary referral hospital in the northern region of Sarawak, Malaysia. Miri Hospital serves as a medical hub for a population of 1.5 million people. Miri Hospital caters not only to the people of Miri district, but also the districts and sub-districts of Limbang, Lawas, Marudi, Ulu Baram, Niah, Sibuti, Bekenu, Suai, Long Lama, Bakelalan and Bario highlands.

== History ==
Ground breaking for the hospital extension project was done on 28 October 2020.
