= Sibu Hospital =

Hospital in Sibu, Sarawak, Malaysia

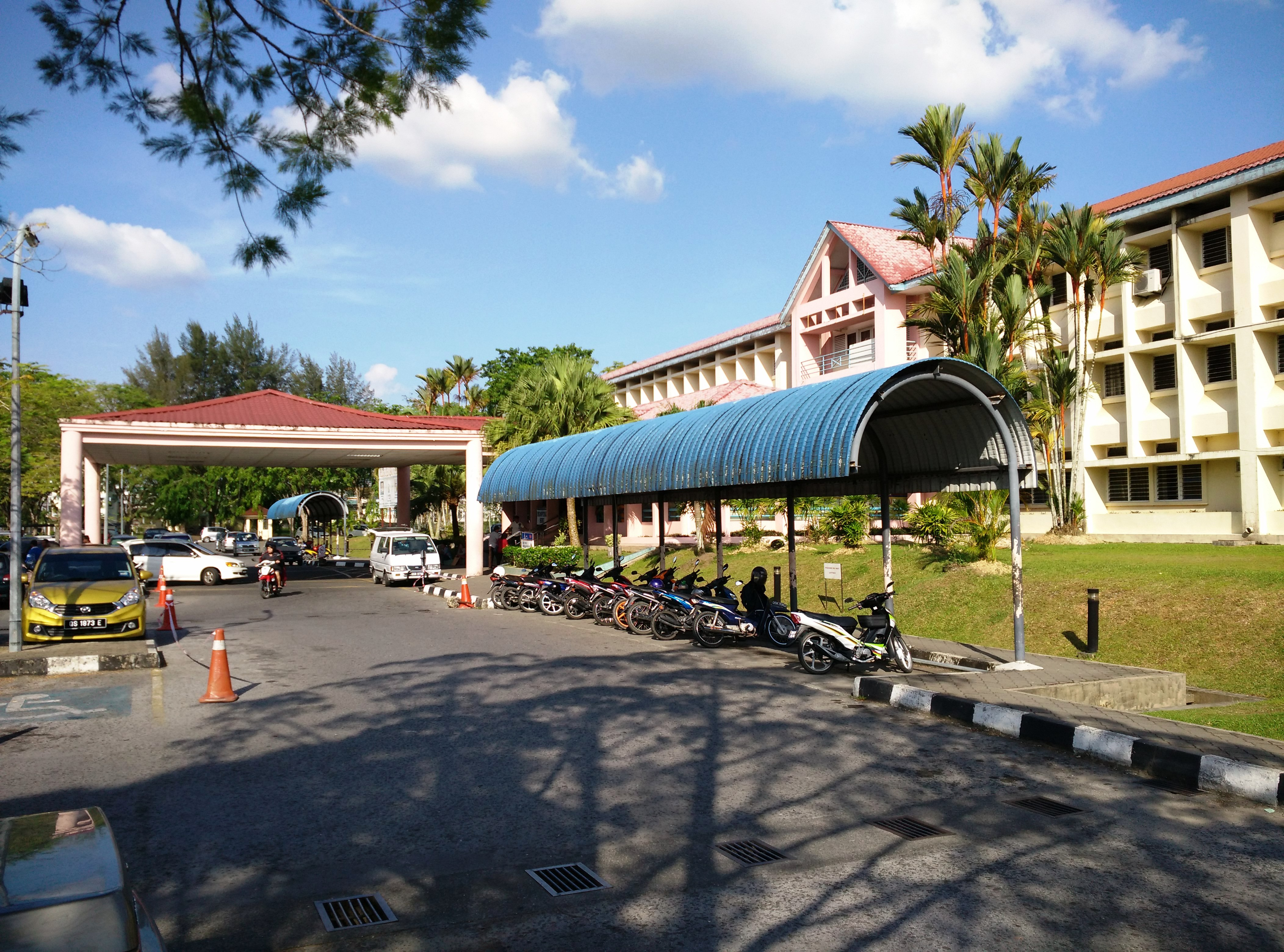
- Main building of Sibu Hospital

Geography
- Location: Batu 5.5, Jalan Ulu Oya, Sibu, Sarawak, Malaysia
- Coordinates: 2°17′49″N 111°53′33″E

Organisation
- Type: General, teaching
- Affiliated university: University Malaysia Sarawak (UNIMAS); SEGi University; Sibu Nursing College

Services
- Emergency department: Yes
- Beds: 642 (capacity: 750)

Helipads
- Helipad: Yes

History
- Founded: August 1994

Links
- Website: hsibu.moh.gov.my
- Lists: Hospitals in Malaysia

Sibu Hospital is the second largest hospital in the state of Sarawak, Malaysia. This hospital is the secondary referral centre for eight district hospitals located in the central region of Sarawak; namely Kanowit, Kapit, Mukah, Dalat, Daro, Sarikei, Saratok, and Betong. Furthermore, urgent cases from Bintulu Hospital are also referred to this hospital.

== History ==
Before Sibu Hospital started operations, the medical needs of Sibu town were previously served by the Lau King Howe Hospital located in the downtown area. In order to accommodate the growing medical needs of the Sibu population, the Malaysian government has constructed Sibu Hospital in 1994. In 2014, a new pathology complex was completed with a pathologist stationed at the hospital. Sibu Hospital is accredited by the Malaysian Society for Quality in Health (MSQH).

On 18 November 2017, there was a fire inside the male medical ward of the hospital due to a faulty air-conditioning system. Nearly 1,000 people were evacuated for a few hours before going back to the wards.

== Services ==
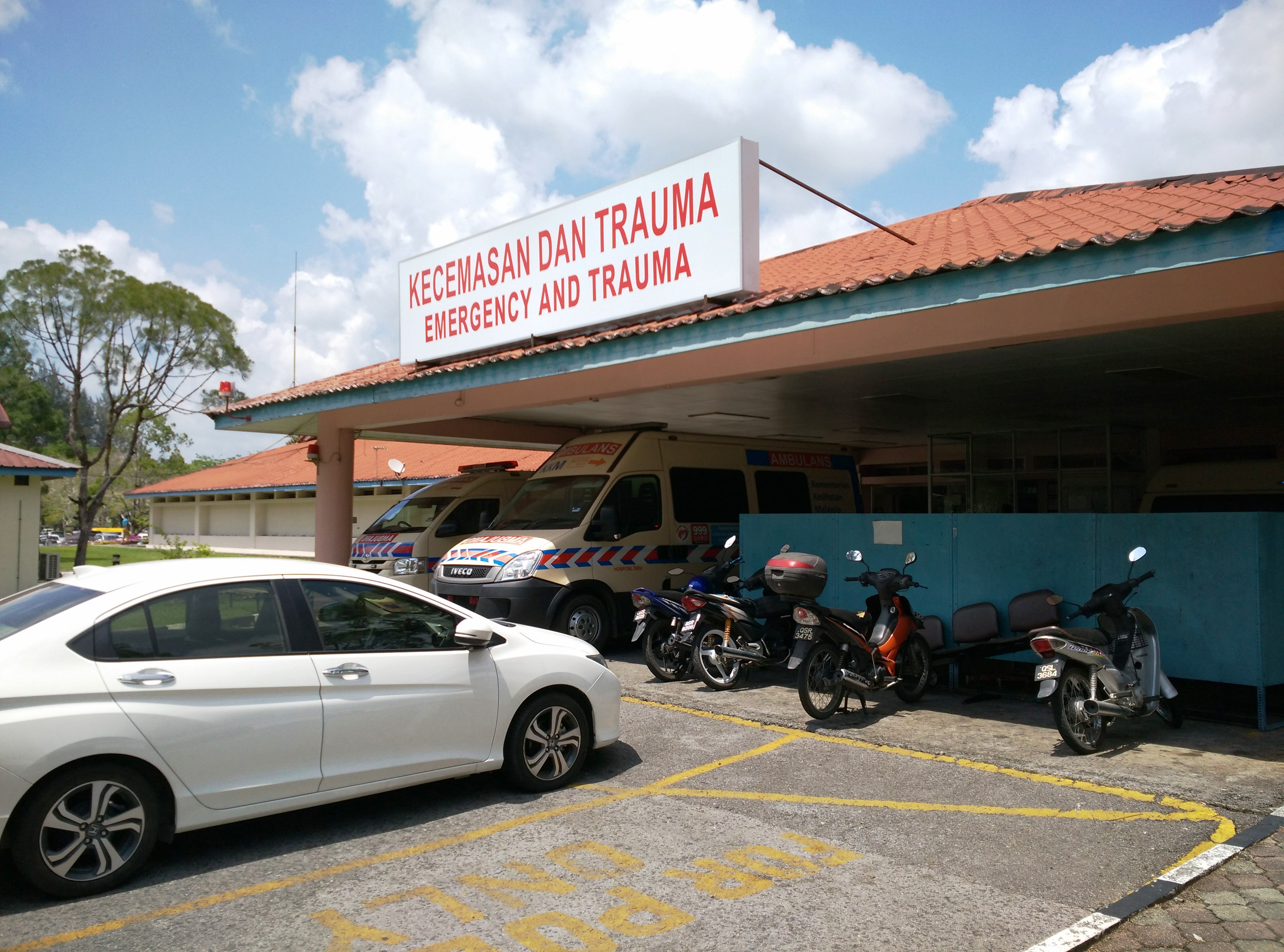
Emergency and Trauma Department of Sibu Hospital.

Sibu Hospital offers a series of specialisations, including: internal medicine, surgery, orthopedics, obstetrics and gynecology, paediatrics, emergency medicine, ophthalmology, ear, nose and throat, radiology, neurosurgery, rheumatology, psychiatry, and anaesthetic services. In December 2019, the hospital launched the first drive-through pharmacy in Sarawak in an effort to provide value-added services to patients.

Sibu Hospital also serves as a teaching centre for University Malaysia Sarawak (UNIMAS), SEGi University and Sibu Nursing College students.
