= Pusa District =

Pusa
- District
- Country: Malaysia
- State: Sarawak
- Division: Betong

Population (2024)
  - Total: 13,952

Map of Pusa District

Pusa is a district, in Betong Division, Sarawak, Malaysia.

== Demographics ==
Total population of every areas in Pusa, Sarawak. These population are exactly based on their ethnics in Sarawak.

Pusa is a district that mostly lived by the Malay and Melanau community, since early 1900s. However, there is fewer community from Iban and Chinese. It's because this district is truly famous of "ikan terubok" (Toli shad) and also famous for "gula apong" (palm sugar).

=== Ethnicity ===
Ethnic composition of Pusa District (2024)
Ethnicities / Nationality	Percentage
Malays	56.59%
Iban	1.38%
Bidayuh	0.14%
Melanau	40.35%
Other Bumiputeras	0.18%
Chinese	0.97%
Indians	0%
Others	0%
Non-Malaysian	0.39%

Ethnicity	2024	
Ethnicity	Pop.	%
Malays	7895	56.59%
Iban	192	1.38%
Bidayuh	20	0.14%
Melanau	5630	40.35%
Other Bumiputeras	25	0.18%
Chinese	136	0.97%
Indians	0	0%
Others	0	0%
Malaysian total	13898	99.61%
Non-Malaysian	54	0.39%
Total	13952	100.00%

Historical population
Year	Pop.	±%
1985	4,180	—
1990	5,644	+35.0%
1995	5,936	+5.2%
2004	7,058	+18.9%
2010	8,760	+24.1%
2015	10,593	+20.9%
2024	13,952	+31.7%

=== Religions ===
There is no recent census that related about residents population based on religion in Pusa District. However based on the total population in this district, Islam is the majority religion, followed by other minority religions such as Christianity and other Chinese folk religion.
