= Samarahan District =

Samarahan
- District
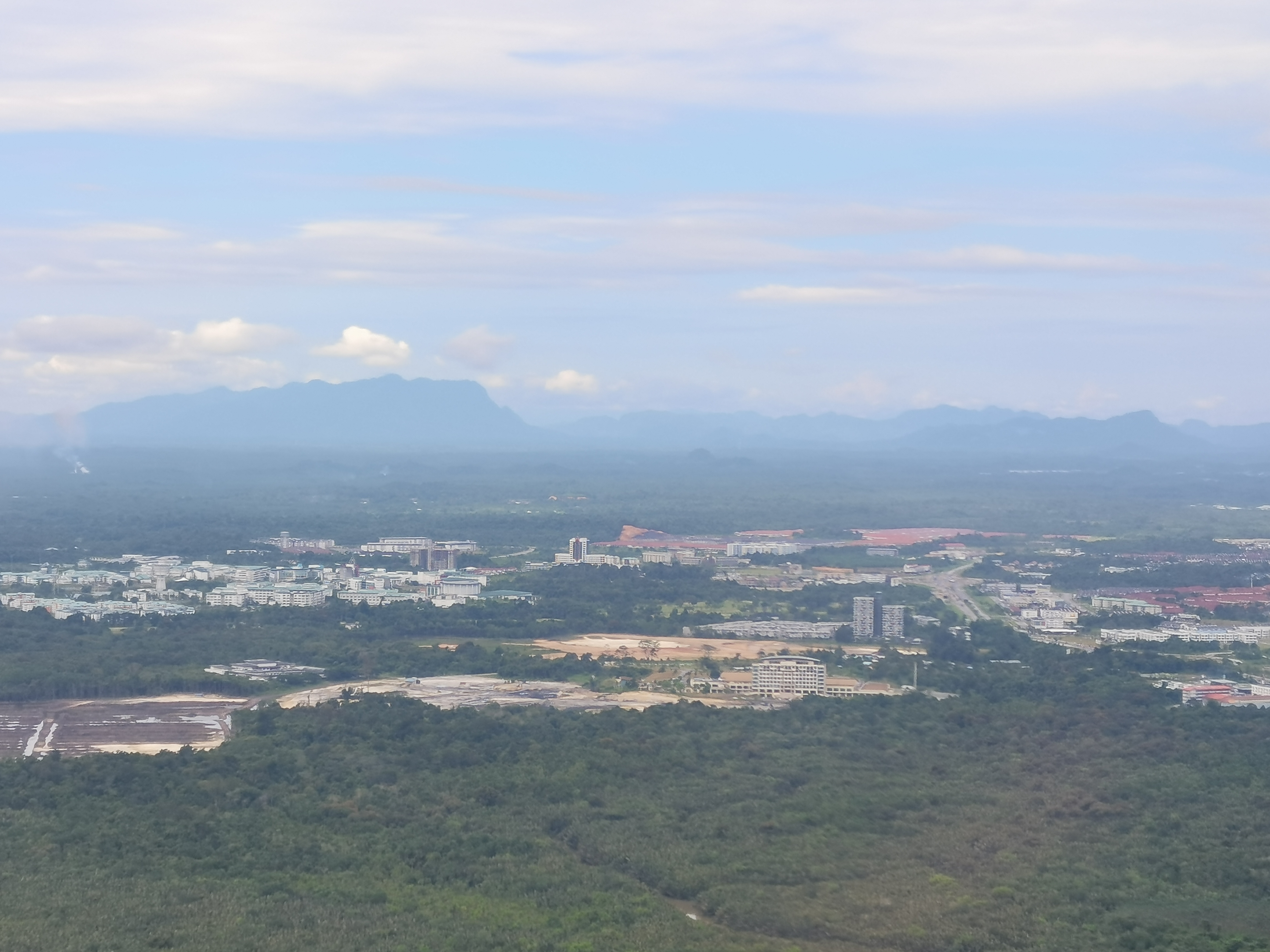
- View of Samarahan district from Kuching. Wisma SALCRA is at the centre of the image while to the left is the UNIMAS campus.
- Interactive map of Samarahan
- Country: Malaysia
- State: Sarawak

Map of Samarahan District

Samarahan is a district, in Samarahan Division, Sarawak, Malaysia. Samarahan is a heart of the Malays and is known as the Town of Knowledge.
