= Kabong District =

Coordinates: 1°49′42.0″N 111°08′01.2″E

Kabong
- District
- Interactive map of Kabong
- Country: Malaysia
- State: Sarawak

Area
  - Total: 799 km^{2} (308 sq mi)

Population (2024)
  - Total: 24,381
  - Density: 30.5/km^{2} (79.0/sq mi)

Map of Kabong District

Kabong is a district, in Betong Division, Sarawak, Malaysia.

== Demographics ==
=== Ethnicity ===
Ethnic composition of Kabong District (2024)
Ethnicities / Nationality	Percentage
Malays	68.92%
Iban	23.87%
Bidayuh	0.14%
Melanau	2.12%
Other Bumiputeras	0.18%
Chinese	3.58%
Indians	0%
Others	0%
Non-Malaysian	1.19%

Ethnicity	2024	
Ethnicity	Pop.	%
Malays	16804	68.92%
Iban	5820	23.87%
Bidayuh	35	0.14%
Melanau	516	2.12%
Other Bumiputeras	43	0.18%
Chinese	872	3.58%
Indians	0	0%
Others	0	0%
Malaysian total	24090	98.81%
Non-Malaysian	291	1.19%
Total	24381	100.00%

Historical population
Year	Pop.	±%
1990	3,876	—
1995	5,984	+54.4%
2004	7,890	+31.9%
2010	12,863	+63.0%
2015	18,192	+41.4%
2024	24,381	+34.0%

=== Religions ===
Religion composition in Kabong District (2024)
Religions	Percent
Islam	68.7%
Christianity	23.2%
Buddhism	3.5%
Chinese folk religion	0.7%
Sikhism	0%
Hinduism	0%
Others	2.6%
Non religious	1.3%

Total population of every areas in Kabong, Sarawak. These population are exactly based on their ethnics in Sarawak.

Kabong is the only district that predominantly Sarawak Malay community, especially in Kabong Town and Gerigat. Only Roban area is mostly are community from Iban ethnic.

== Transport ==
=== Local Bus ===
Route No.	Operating Route	Operator	Remark
24	Sarikei-Kabong	Borneo Bus	
