= Serian District =

Coordinates: 1°10′15″N 110°33′59″E

Serian
- District
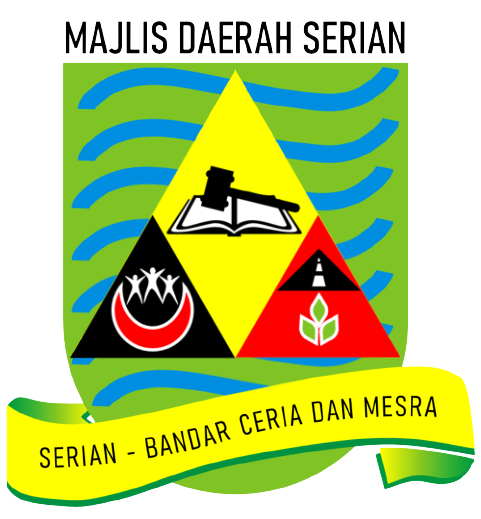
- Seal

- Country: Malaysia
- State: Sarawak
- Granted Municipal Status: 2021 (Postpone)

Serian is a district, in Serian Division, Sarawak, Malaysia.
