= Meradong District =

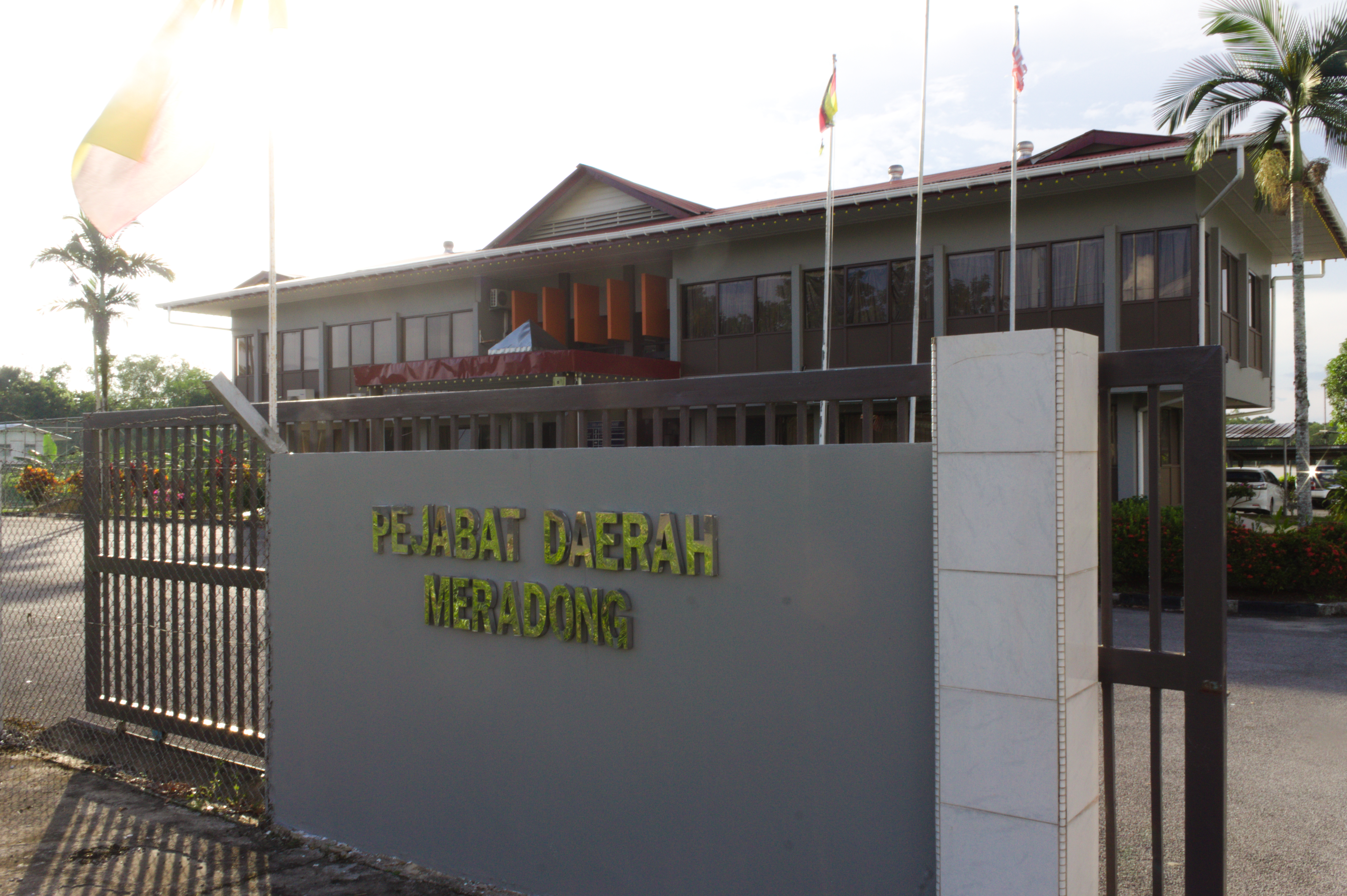
- The Meradong District Office

- Flag Seal

- District Office location: Bintangor

The Meradong District is located in Sarikei Division, Sarawak, Malaysia. The capital of Meradong District is Bintangor, Sarawak. The official census in 2006 stated Meradong as covering 719 sq km, making it the smallest district of Sarawak in terms of geographic area, and the district population from the 2010 National Census was 28,672. It is situated nearby Sarikei District.

== Town and villages ==
=== Bintangor ===
Bintangor is the capital of Meradong district. Bintangor town has four secondary schools, SMK Meradong, SMK Bandar Bintangor, SMK Kai Chung, and SMK Tong Hua.

=== Tulai ===
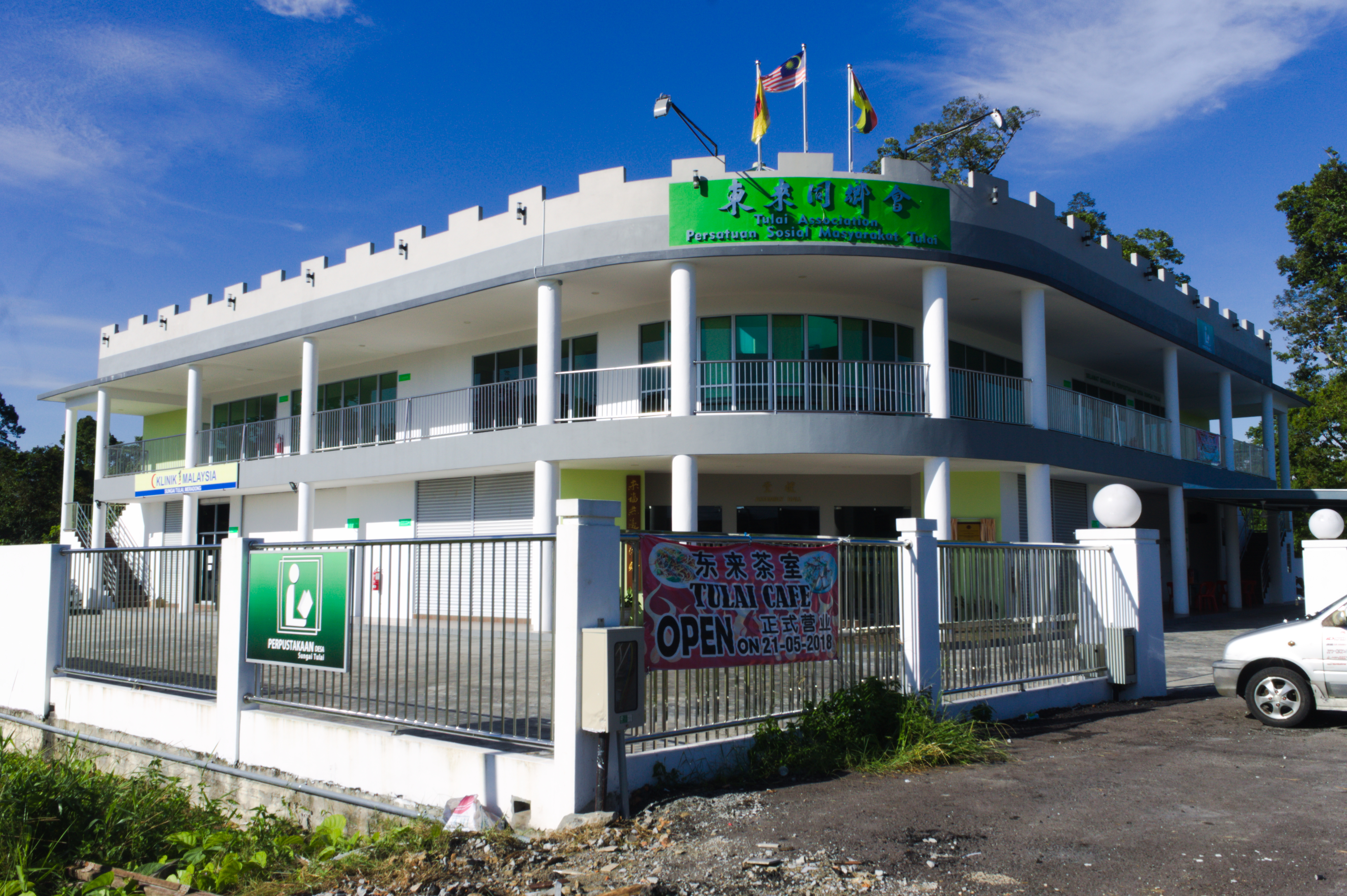
The Tulai Association building.

Sungai Tulai Village Development Committee (JKKK) was established on 1 August 2015. The development committee was set up to improve the infrastructure of village. Tulai Association building was built and officiated on 11 April 2018.

== Education ==
There are also 32 primary schools, of which 18 are national schools (SK) and 14 are national type schools (SJK(c)). Malaysian Teachers Education Institute (Malay: Institut Pendidikan Guru Malaysia) Rajang Campus is also situated at about 17 kilometres from Bintangor town.
