= Beluru District =

Coordinates: 3°59′03.7″N 114°05′59.4″E

Beluru
- District
- Interactive map of Beluru
- Country: Malaysia
- State: Sarawak

Map of Beluru District

Beluru is a district, in Miri Division, Sarawak, Malaysia.
