= 2021 Sarawak state election =

Malaysian state legislative election

- 18 December 2021

All 82 seats in the Legislative Assembly 42 seats needed for a majority
- Registered: 1,252,014
- Turnout: 60.67%
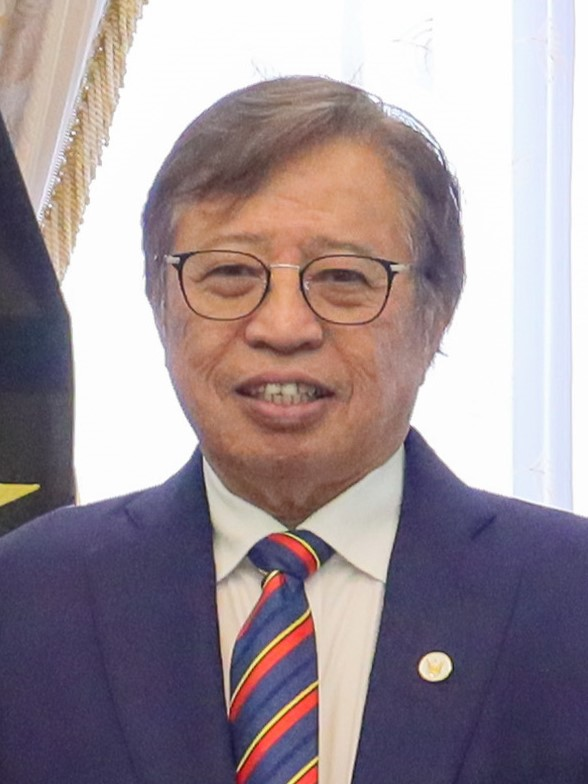

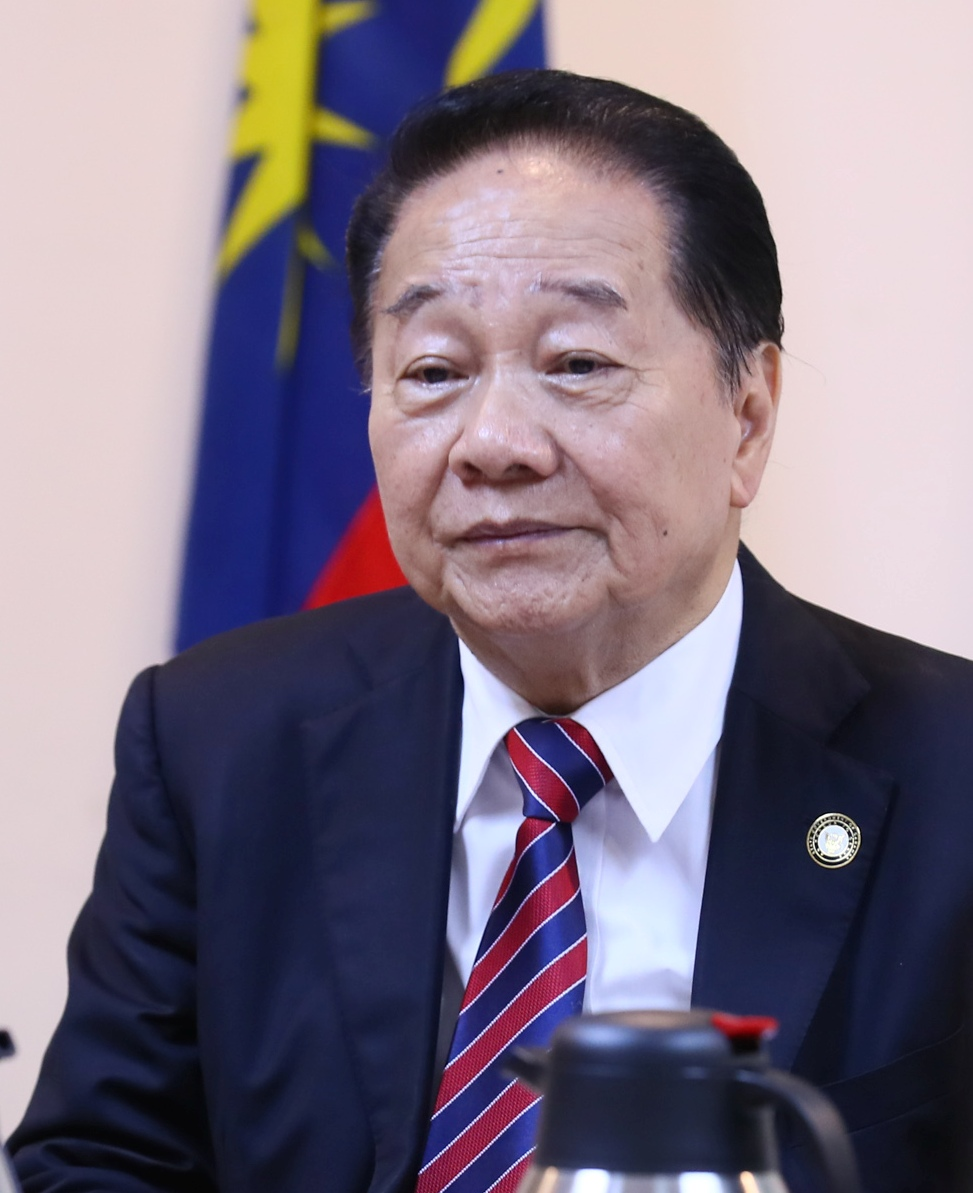

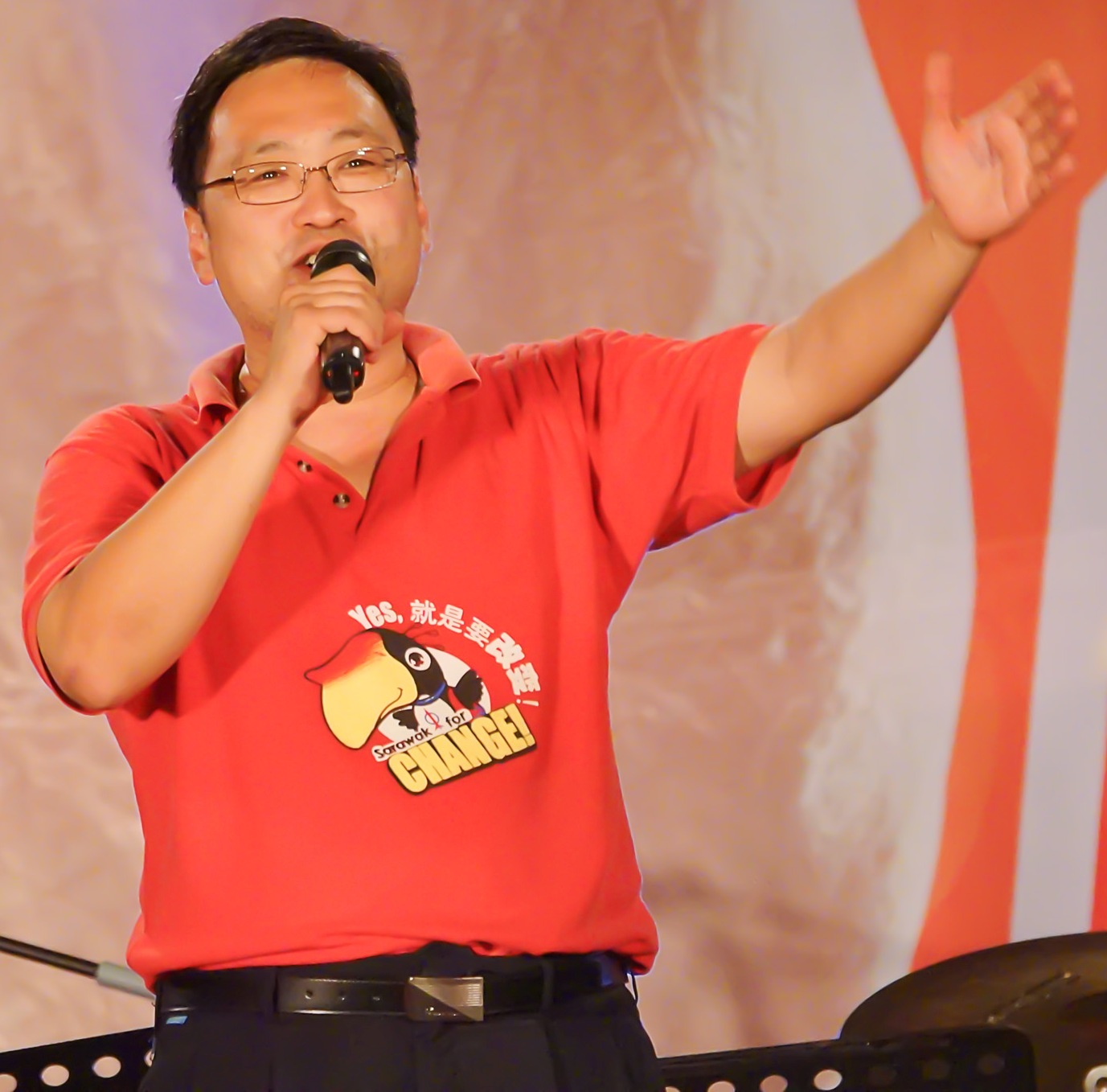
	Majority party	Minority party	Third party
Leader	Abang Johari	Wong Soon Koh	Chong Chieng Jen
Party	PBB	PSB	DAP
Alliance	Gabungan Parti Sarawak		Pakatan Harapan
Leader since	13 January 2017	2015	10 June 2013
Leader's seat	Gedong	Bawang Assan	Padungan
Last election	61 seats, 62.18% (Note: Gabungan Parti Sarawak was a new coalition formed from several existing parties in the immediate aftermath of the 2018 federal election. The component parties (PBB, PRS, SUPP and PDP) held a collective total of 61 seats in the last election.)	Did not contest (Note: PSB did not formally contest the last election. However, five of the six current sitting MLAs participated in the last election as partyless Barisan Nasional candidates.)	10 seats, 30.55%
Seats before	67	6	5
Seats won	76	4	2
Seat change	▲9	▼2	▼3
Popular vote	457,233	139,515	78,197
Percentage	61.26%	18.69%	10.48%
Swing	▼0.92%	▲18.69%	▼20.07%
Chief Minister before election
Abang Johari
GPS–PBB
Elected Chief Minister
Abang Johari (Later Premier)
GPS–PBB

The 2021 Sarawak state election, formally the 12th Sarawak general election, took place on 18 December 2021. This election was to elect 82 members of the 19th Sarawak State Legislative Assembly. The previous assembly was dissolved on 3 November 2021.

As the previous assembly first sat on 7 June 2016, it was originally set to be dissolved automatically on 7 June 2021. However, the 2021 state emergency declaration, preceded by a federal 2021 Malaysian state of emergency declaration nationwide, arising from the 2020–22 Malaysian political crisis and the COVID-19 pandemic, suspended the automatic dissolution of the legislature until the proposed end of the emergency duration on 2 February 2022. On 3 November 2021, Yang di-Pertuan Agong Al-Sultan Abdullah Ri'ayatuddin Al-Mustafa Billah Shah had consented to lift the state of emergency thus the state legislative assembly dissolved automatically and the state election must be held within 60 days after to elect a new state government.

For the first time as a local coalition, Gabungan Parti Sarawak (GPS) won an overwhelming landslide in the election, winning 76 seats and a supermajority over the legislature. At the same time, Parti Sarawak Bersatu (PSB) won four seats, becoming the largest opposition and the first Sarawak-based opposition party to win a seat in an election since 2006. Meanwhile, Pakatan Harapan (PH), however, suffered a crushing defeat, with the Democratic Action Party (DAP) winning only two seats for the coalition, experiencing a decline from seven seats in 2016. Its other component parties, People's Justice Party (PKR) and National Trust Party (AMANAH) lost on all seats they both contested.

== Background ==
=== Previous election ===
The size of the Legislative Assembly was enlarged from 71 to 82 members in the last state election. The incumbent Sarawak Barisan Nasional coalition, led by Adenan Satem, won 72 seats, allowing it to form a majority government. This included 11 members who were not affiliated with any of its component parties.

The election was the first major election for the then newly-formed Pakatan Harapan coalition, the successor to the Pakatan Rakyat coalition. But like its predecessor, it was only an electoral alliance at that time. However, the component parties of the coalition, winning the remaining 10 seats, suffered a swing of 9.63 percentage points against it and an overall loss of 5 seats compared to the 2011 election.

Between June and August 2016, the 11 partyless Barisan Nasional members either joined the United Bumiputera Heritage Party, or left the coalition and joined the then United People's Party (now Parti Sarawak Bersatu). The United People's Party however committed their support for the Barisan Nasional government.

=== Death of Adenan Satem ===
On 11 January 2017, Chief Minister Adenan Satem died from cardiac arrest, thus he was unable to complete his second term. This made him the first sitting Chief Minister of Sarawak to have died while in office. Abang Johari took over the position two days later. A by-election was held in Adenan's seat of Tanjong Datu on 18 February, which was overwhelmingly retained by the Barisan Nasional coalition.

=== 2018 federal election ===
The 2018 federal election resulted in an unprecedented victory for the opposition Pakatan Harapan coalition. In response, the four component parties of Barisan Nasional in Sarawak left the coalition and together formed the Gabungan Parti Sarawak coalition on 12 June 2018.

=== Malaysian political crisis ===
A political crisis began at the federal level in February 2020, resulting in the collapse of the Pakatan Harapan federal government and the establishment of a Perikatan Nasional government. While Sarawak remained largely unaffected, the People's Justice Party lost all of its representation in the Legislative Assembly by April 2020, with all six remaining Pakatan Harapan seats being held by the Democratic Action Party. The Malaysian United Indigenous Party saw its introduction in the state with the membership of Ali Biju, the MLA for Krian.

=== 2020–21 events ===
On 26 July 2020, the member for Padungan, Wong King Wei, left the Democratic Action Party to sit as an independent member. This resulted in Parti Sarawak Bersatu overtaking Pakatan Harapan as the second largest grouping in the Legislative Assembly. PSB chairman Wong Soon Koh took over as opposition leader on 9 November 2020

On 1 August 2020, the newly-formed political informal alliance Gabungan Anak Sarawak (GASAK) which includes parties of Sarawak People's Aspiration Party (Aspirasi), Sarawak Workers Party (SWP), Parti Bansa Dayak Sarawak Baru (PBDSB), with NGOs of Sarawak for Sarawakians (S4S) and Sarawak Independence Alliance (SIA) announced that GASAK will contest in all 82 seats in next state election, using Aspirasi's logo. The statement was later revised on 1 October 2020, with GASAK parties contesting 50 seats and the rest contested by an unaffiliated party, Sarawak People Awareness Party (SEDAR). SEDAR was planning to contest all 82 seats.

Media reports indicated in July 2020 that the election will likely be held in November after the consideration of the federal and state budgets in October. It is expected that at least three candidates (GPS, PH and a minor party) will be fielded in all 82 constituencies.

After the election schedule was announced, some nationalist parties such as Pejuang, Barisan Nasional and Bersatu stayed out of the election. Parti Tenaga Rakyat Sarawak (TERAS), a local party whose candidates in the last election contested as BN Direct Members, did not contest citing lack of preparation. PAS declared their intention to contest in the election as a warm-up to the next General Election.

Although the assembly was set to dissolve on 6 June, it was announced that the assembly would not dissolve until 1 August, due to the ongoing 2021 Malaysian state of emergency.

== Electoral system ==
Elections in Malaysia are conducted at the federal and state levels. Federal elections elect members of the Dewan Rakyat, the lower house of Parliament, while state elections in each of the 13 states elect members of their respective state legislative assembly. As Malaysia follows the Westminster system of government, the head of government (Prime Minister at the federal level and the Menteri Besar/Chief Ministers at the state level) is the person who commands the confidence of the majority of members in the respective legislature – this is normally the leader of the party or coalition with the majority of seats in the legislature.

The Legislative Assembly consists of 82 members, known as Members of the Legislative Assembly (MLAs), that are elected for five-year terms. Each MLA is elected from a single-member constituencies using the first-past-the-post voting system; each constituency contains approximately an equal number of voters. If one party obtains a majority of seats, then that party is entitled to form the government, with its leader becoming the Chief Minister. In the event of a hung parliament, where no single party obtains the majority of seats, the government may still form through a coalition or a confidence and supply agreement with other parties. In practice, coalitions and alliances in Malaysia, and by extension, in Sarawak, generally persist between elections, and member parties do not normally contest for the same seats.

In general, the voting age is currently 21 although the age of majority in the country is 18. While the Constitution (Amendment) Act 2019, which provided for the voting age to be lowered to 18 and automatic voter registration, was enacted in July 2019, it was not proclaimed until 1 December 2021, which set 15 December as the commencement date of the amendment, after the voter lists for this election has been finalised. Cabinet Minister Abdul Karim Rahman Hamzah asserted that prospective voters between ages 18 and 20 who had registered before 2 November are allowed to vote in the election, but this has not been separately verified by the Election Commission. Elections are conducted by the Election Commission of Malaysia, which is under the jurisdiction of the Prime Minister's Department. Malaysia does not practice compulsory voting.

== Timeline ==
Date	Event
3 November 2021	Dissolution of the 18th Legislative Assembly
24 November 2021	Issue of the writs of election
6 December 2021	Nomination day
7–17 December 2021	Campaigning period
14–17 December 2021	Early voting for postal, overseas and advance voters
18 December 2021	Election day

== Constituencies ==
Electoral map of Sarawak, showing all 82 constituencies

2021 Sarawak state election constituencies

Federal seat	No.	Constituency	Electors (2021) (Note: Pink denotes constituencies that are more than 33% from mean value of Sarawak electors, while light blue denotes lesser.)	Area (km2)	Density	District	Last election assemblyperson	Last election held party	Majority
P.192 Mas Gading	N01	Opar	11436	1010	11.3	Lundu & Bau	Ranum Mina	BN	2,082
P.192 Mas Gading	N02	Tasik Biru	18715	471	39.7	Bau	Henry Jinep	BN (SPDP)	1,288
P.193 Santubong	N03	Tanjong Datu	11384	905	12.6	Lundu	Adenan Satem	BN (PBB)	5,892
P.193 Santubong	N04	Pantai Damai	20506	373	55.0	Kuching	Abdul Rahman Junaidi	BN (PBB)	9,260
P.193 Santubong	N05	Demak Laut	14813	223	66.4	Kuching	Hazland Abang Hipni	BN (PBB)	7,382
P.194 Petra Jaya	N06	Tupong	26004	99	262.7	Kuching	Fazzrudin Abdul Rahman	BN (PBB)	8,055
P.194 Petra Jaya	N07	Samariang	21363	17	1,256.6	Kuching	Sharifah Hasidah Sayeed Aman Ghazali	BN (PBB)	7,760
P.194 Petra Jaya	N08	Satok	14314	10	1,431.4	Kuching	Abang Johari	BN (PBB)	5,045
P.195 Bandar Kuching	N09	Padungan	20949	6	3,491.5	Kuching	Wong King Wei	PH (DAP)	4,270
P.195 Bandar Kuching	N10	Pending	29747	14	2,124.8	Kuching	Violet Yong Wui Wui	PH (DAP)	5,012
P.195 Bandar Kuching	N11	Batu Lintang	29694	15	1,979.6	Kuching	See Chee How	PH (PKR)	4,385
P.196 Stampin	N12	Kota Sentosa	28392	35	811.2	Kuching	Chong Chieng Jen	PH (DAP)	2,819
P.196 Stampin	N13	Batu Kitang	20820	80	260.3	Kuching	Lo Khere Chiang	BN (SUPP)	1,842
P.196 Stampin	N14	Batu Kawah	20681	79	261.8	Kuching	Sim Kui Hian	BN (SUPP)	2,085
P.197 Kota Samarahan	N15	Asajaya	12349	246	50.2	Asajaya & Samarahan	Abdul Karim Rahman Hamzah	BN (PBB)	4,078
P.197 Kota Samarahan	N16	Muara Tuang	18644	399	46.7	Samarahan & Siburan & Serian	Idris Buang	BN (PBB)	7,961
P.197 Kota Samarahan	N17	Stakan	16992	100	169.9	Samarahan & Kuching	Mohamad Ali Mahmud	BN (PBB)	7,042
P.198 Puncak Borneo	N18	Serembu	9834	311	31.6	Bau	Miro Simuh	BN	1,397
P.198 Puncak Borneo	N19	Mambong	19315	497	38.9	Kuching & Siburan	Jerip Susil	BN	3,333
P.198 Puncak Borneo	N20	Tarat	17717	520	34.1	Serian & Tebedu & Kuching & Siburan	Roland Sagah Wee Inn	BN (PBB)	5,421
P.199 Serian	N21	Tebedu	12040	485	24.8	Tebedu & Serian & Siburan	Michael Manyin Jawong	BN (PBB)	6,193
P.199 Serian	N22	Kedup	11202	406	27.6	Serian & Tebedu	Maclaine Ben @ Martin Ben	BN (PBB)	3,828
P.199 Serian	N23	Bukit Semuja	14893	572	26.0	Serian	John Ilus	BN	3,144
P.200 Batang Sadong	N24	Sadong Jaya	7653	76	100.7	Asajaya	Aidel Lariwoo	BN (PBB)	3,467
P.200 Batang Sadong	N25	Simunjan	8299	323	25.7	Simunjan & Asajaya	Awla Idris	BN (PBB)	2,712
P.200 Batang Sadong	N26	Gedong	7208	632	11.4	Gedong & Simunjan	Mohd Naroden Majais	BN (PBB)	3,365
P.201 Batang Lupar	N27	Sebuyau	9367	548	17.1	Simunjan	Julaihi Narawi	BN (PBB)	2,742
P.201 Batang Lupar	N28	Lingga	9578	970	9.9	Sri Aman & Pusa & Lingga	Simoi Peri	BN (PBB)	2,943
P.201 Batang Lupar	N29	Beting Maro	11094	472	23.5	Pusa	Razaili Gapor	BN (PBB)	1,707
P.202 Sri Aman	N30	Balai Ringin	10791	1314	8.2	Serian & Simunjan & Lingga & Pantu	Snowdan Lawan	BN (PRS)	2,039
P.202 Sri Aman	N31	Bukit Begunan	9632	1057	9.1	Sri Aman & Lingga & Pantu	Mong Dagang	BN (PRS)	4,695
P.202 Sri Aman	N32	Simanggang	13224	307	43.1	Sri Aman	Francis Harden Hollis	BN (SUPP)	1,390
P.203 Lubok Antu	N33	Engkilili	11039	1298	8.5	Lubok Antu & Betong	Johnical Rayong Ngipa	BN	3,857
P.203 Lubok Antu	N34	Batang Ai	9929	1996	5.0	Lubok Antu	Malcom Mussen Lamoh	BN (PRS)	3,186
P.204 Betong	N35	Saribas	10984	412	26.7	Betong	Ricky @ Mohamad Razi Sitam	BN (PBB)	4,432
P.204 Betong	N36	Layar	9334	409	22.8	Betong	Gerald Rentap Jabu	BN (PBB)	1,428
P.204 Betong	N37	Bukit Saban	9523	577	16.5	Betong	Douglas Uggah Embas	BN (PBB)	4,599
P.205 Saratok	N38	Kalaka	8052	422	19.1	Kabong & Saratok	Abdul Wahab Aziz	BN (PBB)	2,835
P.205 Saratok	N39	Krian	13074	829	15.8	Saratok & Kabong	Ali Biju	PH (PKR)	1,640
P.205 Saratok	N40	Kabong	10111	415	24.4	Kabong	Mohd Chee Kadir	BN (PBB)	3,585
P.206 Tanjong Manis	N41	Kuala Rajang	11428	778	14.7	Sarikei & Tanjung Manis	Len Talif Salleh	BN (PBB)	5,586
P.206 Tanjong Manis	N42	Semop	10297	1246	8.3	Daro	Abdullah Saidol	BN (PBB)	4,412
P.207 Igan	N43	Daro	9195	1482	6.2	Daro & Sibu	Safiee Ahmad	BN (PBB)	4,432
P.207 Igan	N44	Jemoreng	9963	724	13.8	Matu	Juanda Jaya	BN (PBB)	3,789
P.208 Sarikei	N45	Repok	23541	144	163.5	Sarikei	Huang Tiong Sii	BN (SUPP)	943
P.208 Sarikei	N46	Meradong	18156	568	32.0	Sarikei & Meradong	Ding Kuong Hiing	BN (SUPP)	1,516
P.209 Julau	N47	Pakan	11154	852	13.1	Pakan & Sarikei	William Mawan Ikom	BN	426
P.209 Julau	N48	Meluan	14671	2006	7.3	Julau & Pakan	Rolland Duat Jubin	BN (SPDP)	677
P.210 Kanowit	N49	Ngemah	9853	1211	8.1	Kanowit	Alexander Vincent	BN (PRS)	154
P.210 Kanowit	N50	Machan	11763	976	12.1	Kanowit	Allan Siden Gramong	BN (PBB)	2,952
P.211 Lanang	N51	Bukit Assek	27636	53	521.4	Sibu	Irene Mary Chang Oi Ling	PH (DAP)	4,497
P.211 Lanang	N52	Dudong	34955	669	52.2	Sibu	Tiong Thai King	BN	2,146
P.212 Sibu	N53	Bawang Assan	19650	1074	18.3	Sibu & Matu	Wong Soon Koh	BN	4,131
P.212 Sibu	N54	Pelawan	34466	12	2,872.2	Sibu	David Wong Kee Woan	PH (DAP)	4,314
P.212 Sibu	N55	Nangka	23092	313	73.8	Sibu	Annuar Rapaee	BN (PBB)	7,617
P.213 Mukah	N56	Dalat	12503	658	19.0	Dalat	Fatimah Abdullah	BN (PBB)	6,330
P.213 Mukah	N57	Tellian	10059	1227	8.2	Mukah & Dalat	Yussibnosh Balo	BN (PBB)	4,421
P.213 Mukah	N58	Balingian	8704	1100	7.9	Mukah	Abdul Yakub Arbi	BN (PBB)	2,964
P.214 Selangau	N59	Tamin	16681	3492	4.8	Selangau & Sibu	Christopher Gira Sambang	BN (PRS)	2,085
P.214 Selangau	N60	Kakus	14416	5701	2.5	Tatau & Mukah & Selangau	John Sikie Tayai	BN (PRS)	5,211
P.215 Kapit	N61	Pelagus	7894	1635	4.8	Kapit	Wilsong Nyabong Ijang	BN (PRS)	3,284
P.215 Kapit	N62	Katibas	10530	3820	2.8	Song	Ambrose Blikau Enturan	BN (PBB)	3,053
P.215 Kapit	N63	Bukit Goram	12150	876	13.9	Kapit	Jefferson Jamit Unyat	BN (PBB)	2,586
P.216 Hulu Rajang	N64	Baleh	10137	11607	0.9	Bukit Mabong	James Jemut Masing	BN (PRS)	4,793
P.216 Hulu Rajang	N65	Belaga	8003	11579	0.7	Belaga & Kapit & Bukit Mabong	Liwan Lagang	BN (PRS)	3,686
P.216 Hulu Rajang	N66	Murum	9738	10894	0.9	Belaga & Sebauh	Chukpai Ugon	BN (PRS)	2,200
P.217 Bintulu	N67	Jepak	14643	701	20.9	Bintulu & Tatau	Talip Zulpilip	BN (PBB)	4,201
P.217 Bintulu	N68	Tanjong Batu	22743	35	649.8	Bintulu	Chiew Chiu Sing	PH (DAP)	2,548
P.217 Bintulu	N69	Kemena	14252	5307	2.7	Sebauh & Subis	Stephen Rundi Utom	BN (PBB)	4,868
P.217 Bintulu	N70	Samalaju	17981	2257	8.0	Bintulu & Subis	Majang Renggi	BN (PRS)	2,464
P.218 Sibuti	N71	Bekenu	12674	1103	11.5	Subis	Rosey Yunus	BN	4,789
P.218 Sibuti	N72	Lambir	19907	473	42.1	Miri & Subis	Ripin Lamat	BN (PBB)	4,907
P.219 Miri	N73	Piasau	21377	51	419.2	Miri	Sebastian Ting Chiew Yew	BN (SUPP)	2,112
P.219 Miri	N74	Pujut	27567	17	1,621.6	Miri	Ting Tiong Choon	PH (DAP)	1,759
P.219 Miri	N75	Senadin	34117	703	48.5	Miri	Lee Kim Shin	BN (SUPP)	3,538
P.220 Baram	N76	Marudi	16478	3538	4.7	Marudi & Beluru	Penguang Manggil	BN (SPDP)	1,387
P.220 Baram	N77	Telang Usan	11465	9062	1.3	Telang Usan & Beluru	Dennis Ngau	BN (PBB)	167
P.220 Baram	N78	Mulu	9572	9475	1.0	Marudi & Miri & Telang Usan	Gerawat Jala	BN	1,708
P.221 Limbang	N79	Bukit Kota	16975	468	36.3	Limbang	Abdul Rahman Ismail	BN (PBB)	-
P.221 Limbang	N80	Batu Danau	9375	3743	2.5	Limbang	Paulus Gumbang	BN	2,939
P.222 Lawas	N81	Ba'kelalan	8503	3444	2.5	Lawas	Baru Bian	PH (PKR)	538
P.222 Lawas	N82	Bukit Sari	13054	445	29.3	Lawas	Awang Tengah Ali Hassan	BN (PBB)	-

== Political parties ==
Name		Ideology	Leading candidate(s)	2016 election results		Seats at dissolution	Cand.
Name		Ideology	Leading candidate(s)	Votes (%)	Seats	Seats at dissolution	Cand.
Gabungan Parti Sarawak (GPS)	Parti Pesaka Bumiputera Bersatu (PBB)	Bumiputera nationalism	Abang Johari	62.19 (Note: As part of Barisan Nasional.)	72 / 82 (88%)	67 / 82 (82%)	82
Gabungan Parti Sarawak (GPS)	Parti Rakyat Sarawak (PRS)	Nationalism	James Jemut Masing (Died in office)	62.19	72 / 82 (88%)	67 / 82 (82%)	82
Gabungan Parti Sarawak (GPS)	Sarawak United Peoples' Party (SUPP)	Sarawak autonomism	Sim Kui Hian	62.19	72 / 82 (88%)	67 / 82 (82%)	82
Gabungan Parti Sarawak (GPS)	Progressive Democratic Party (PDP)	Sarawak regionalism	Tiong King Sing	62.19	72 / 82 (88%)	67 / 82 (82%)	82
Pakatan Harapan (PH)	Democratic Action Party (DAP)	Social democracy	Chong Chieng Jen	30.16	10 / 82 (12%)	5 / 82 (6%)	62
Pakatan Harapan (PH)	People's Justice Party (PKR)	Social Justice	Abang Zulkifli Abang Engkeh	30.16	10 / 82 (12%)	5 / 82 (6%)	62
Pakatan Harapan (PH)	National Trust Party (AMANAH)	Islamic modernism	Abang Halil Abang Naili	30.16	10 / 82 (12%)	5 / 82 (6%)	62
Perikatan Nasional (PN)	Malaysian Islamic Party (PAS)	Islamism	Mohammad Arifiriazul Paijo	1.73	0 / 82 (0%)	0 / 82 (0%)	1
Gagasan Anak Sarawak (GASAK)	Parti Aspirasi Rakyat Sarawak (ASPIRASI)	Sarawak regionalism	Lina Soo	0.37	0 / 82 (0%)	0 / 82 (0%)	15
Gagasan Anak Sarawak (GASAK)	Parti Bansa Dayak Sarawak Baru (PBDSB)	Dayak nationalism	Bobby William	0.16	0 / 82 (0%)	0 / 82 (0%)	11
Parti Sedar Rakyat Sarawak (SEDAR)		Sarawak regionalism	Othman Abdillah	New party		0 / 82 (0%)	5
Parti Bumi Kenyalang (PBK)		Sarawak regionalism	Voon Lee Shan	New party		0 / 82 (0%)	73
Parti Sarawak Bersatu (PSB)		Sarawak regionalism	Wong Soon Koh	Did not contest (Note: Some PSB members contested the 2016 election as non-affiliated Barisan Nasional candidates, but returned to PSB shortly after.)		6 / 82 (7%)	70
Independents				5.39	0 / 82 (0%)	1 / 82 (1%)	30

== Campaign ==
Campaigning in parking lots, open spaces, and large halls with the presence and cheers of hundreds of people has been the norm in previous elections, but the threat of COVID-19 has hindered it this time in the state election. Because of this, the Election Commission (EC) decided not to allow any physical campaigning, with only 64 of the 82 constituencies with inadequate internet access being allowed to hold talks. The EC has encouraged all candidates to use social media to campaign.

Despite the gloomy campaign mood caused by these restrictions, the candidates' campaign machinery has actively hung and put up flags, posters, and banners featuring candidate portraits and party logos, particularly from the opposing political parties.

== Incumbents not seeking re-election ==
The following members of the 18th Legislative Assembly are not contesting the upcoming election.

No.	Constituency	Departing MLA	Party	Date confirmed	First elected	Reason
N74	Pujut	Ting Tiong Choon	PH (DAP)	11 February 2020	2016	Disqualified after having dual citizenship
N38	Kalaka	Abdul Wahab Aziz	GPS (PBB)	9 July 2020	1991	Retirement
N09	Padungan	Wong King Wei	Independent	26 July 2020	2011	Retirement
N64	Baleh	James Jemut Masing	GPS (PRS)	31 October 2021	1983	Died in office
N26	Gedong	Naroden Majais	GPS (PBB)	17 November 2021	1991	Retirement
N62	Katibas	Ambrose Bilkau Enturan	GPS (PBB)	17 November 2021	1979	Retirement
N17	Stakan	Mohamad Ali Mahmud	GPS (PBB)	21 November 2021	2016	Retirement
N21	Tebedu	Michael Manyin Jawong	GPS (PBB)	23 November 2021	1996	Retirement
N68	Tanjong Batu	Chiew Chiu Sing	PH (DAP)	26 November 2021	2001	Lost preselection
N03	Tanjong Datu	Jamilah Anu	GPS (PBB)	1 December 2021	2017	Retirement
N49	Ngemah	Alexander Vincent	GPS (PRS)	3 December 2021	2011	Lost preselection
N28	Lingga	Simoi Peri	GPS (PBB)	3 December 2021	2006	Lost preselection
N57	Tellian	Yussibnosh Balo	GPS (PBB)	3 December 2021	2014	Lost preselection
N52	Dudong	Tiong Thai King	PSB	4 December 2021	2016	Lost preselection
N39	Krian	Ali Biju	PN (BERSATU)	9 December 2021	2011	Withdrew nomination (Note: Due to SPR regulations, Ali Biju's name remains on the ballot.)

== Electoral candidates ==
Parliamentary constituency		State constituency		Incumbent MLA	Political coalitions						Other parties/ Independent	
Parliamentary constituency		State constituency		Incumbent MLA	Gabungan Parti Sarawak (GPS)		Pakatan Harapan (PH)		Gabungan Anak Sarawak (GAGAS)		Other parties/ Independent	
Parliamentary constituency		State constituency		Incumbent MLA	Candidate name	Party	Candidate name	Party	Candidate name	Party	Candidate name	Party
P192	Mas Gading	N01	Opar	Ranum Mina (PSB)	Billy Sujang	SUPP	Meneng Biris	PKR	Saini Kakong	PBDSB	Ranum Mina	PSB
P192	Mas Gading	N01	Opar	Ranum Mina (PSB)	Billy Sujang	SUPP	Meneng Biris	PKR	Saini Kakong	PBDSB	Bayang Teron	SEDAR
P192	Mas Gading	N01	Opar	Ranum Mina (PSB)	Billy Sujang	SUPP	Meneng Biris	PKR	Saini Kakong	PBDSB	Freedy Misid	PBK
P192	Mas Gading	N02	Tasik Biru	Henry Harry Jinep (GPS)	Henry Harry Jinep	PDP	Granda Aing	DAP	None		Tiki Lafe	PSB
P192	Mas Gading	N02	Tasik Biru	Henry Harry Jinep (GPS)	Henry Harry Jinep	PDP	Granda Aing	DAP	None		Paul Shanon Kenbel Barin	PBK
P193	Santubong	N03	Tanjong Datu	Jamilah Anu (GPS)	Azizul Annuar Adenan	PBB	None		None		Jery'in Fauzi	PSB
P193	Santubong	N03	Tanjong Datu	Jamilah Anu (GPS)	Azizul Annuar Adenan	PBB	None		None		Goem Pijar	PBK
P193	Santubong	N03	Tanjong Datu	Jamilah Anu (GPS)	Azizul Annuar Adenan	PBB	None		None		Abdul Talib Baee	IND
P193	Santubong	N04	Pantai Damai	Abdul Rahman Junaidi (GPS)	Abdul Rahman Junaidi	PBB	None		None		Mahmud Sabli	PSB
P193	Santubong	N05	Demak Laut	Hazland Abang Hipni (GPS)	Hazland Abang Hipni	PBB	Mohamad Zen Peli	AMANAH	None		Yatika Jelani	PSB
P193	Santubong	N05	Demak Laut	Hazland Abang Hipni (GPS)	Hazland Abang Hipni	PBB	Mohamad Zen Peli	AMANAH	None		Khairul Ahmad	IND
P194	Petra Jaya	N06	Tupong	Fazzrudin Abdul Rahman (GPS)	Fazzrudin Abdul Rahman	PBB	Ahmad Nazib Johari	PKR	None		Chan Haong Yen	PBK
P194	Petra Jaya	N07	Samariang	Sharifah Hasidah Sayeed Aman Ghazali (GPS)	Sharifah Hasidah Sayeed Aman Ghazali	PBB	Abang Abdul Halil Abang Naili	AMANAH	None		Othman Abdillah	SEDAR
P194	Petra Jaya	N08	Satok	Abang Johari (GPS)	Ibrahim Baki	PBB	Nor Irwan Ahmat Nor	PKR	None		Awang Badele Awang Ali	PBK
P195	Bandar Kuching	N09	Padungan	Wong King Wei (IND)	Wee Hong Seng	SUPP	Chong Chieng Jen	DAP	Lina Soo	ASPIRASI	Raymond Thong Ee Yu	PBK
P195	Bandar Kuching	N10	Pending	Violet Yong Wui Wui (PH)	Milton Foo Tiang Wee	SUPP	Violet Yong Wui Wui	DAP	Chang Chee Hiong	ASPIRASI	Tan Kay Hok	PSB
P195	Bandar Kuching	N10	Pending	Violet Yong Wui Wui (PH)	Milton Foo Tiang Wee	SUPP	Violet Yong Wui Wui	DAP	Chang Chee Hiong	ASPIRASI	Patrick Teo Kuang Kim	PBK
P195	Bandar Kuching	N11	Batu Lintang	See Chee How (PSB)	Sih Hua Tong	SUPP	Cherishe Ng Phuay Hui	PKR	Leong Shaow Tung	ASPIRASI	See Chee How	PSB
P195	Bandar Kuching	N11	Batu Lintang	See Chee How (PSB)	Sih Hua Tong	SUPP	Cherishe Ng Phuay Hui	PKR	Leong Shaow Tung	ASPIRASI	Voon Lee Shan	PBK
P196	Stampin	N12	Kota Sentosa	Chong Chieng Jen (PH)	Wilfred Yap Yau Sin	SUPP	Michael Kong Feng Nian	DAP	Tan Kok Chiang	ASPIRASI	John Lau Pang Heng	PSB
P196	Stampin	N12	Kota Sentosa	Chong Chieng Jen (PH)	Wilfred Yap Yau Sin	SUPP	Michael Kong Feng Nian	DAP	Tan Kok Chiang	ASPIRASI	Lue Cheng Hing	PBK
P196	Stampin	N13	Batu Kitang	Lo Khere Chiang (GPS)	Lo Khere Chiang	SUPP	Abdul Aziz Isa	DAP	None		Liu Thian Leong	PSB
P196	Stampin	N13	Batu Kitang	Lo Khere Chiang (GPS)	Lo Khere Chiang	SUPP	Abdul Aziz Isa	DAP	None		Wong Tun Teck	PBK
P196	Stampin	N14	Batu Kawah	Sim Kui Hian (GPS)	Sim Kui Hian	SUPP	Kelvin Yii Lee Wuen	DAP	Fong Pau Teck	ASPIRASI	Chai Keuh Khun	PBK
P197	Kota Samarahan	N15	Asajaya	Abdul Karim Rahman Hamzah (GPS)	Abdul Karim Rahman Hamzah	PBB	Mahmud Epah	PKR	None		Ishak Buji	PSB
P197	Kota Samarahan	N15	Asajaya	Abdul Karim Rahman Hamzah (GPS)	Abdul Karim Rahman Hamzah	PBB	Mahmud Epah	PKR	None		Mohamad Mahdeen Saharuddin	PBK
P197	Kota Samarahan	N16	Muara Tuang	Idris Buang (GPS)	Idris Buang	PBB	Daud Eali	AMANAH	None		Yakup Khalid	PSB
P197	Kota Samarahan	N16	Muara Tuang	Idris Buang (GPS)	Idris Buang	PBB	Daud Eali	AMANAH	None		Sigandam Sulaiman	PBK
P197	Kota Samarahan	N16	Muara Tuang	Idris Buang (GPS)	Idris Buang	PBB	Daud Eali	AMANAH	None		Hipni Sulaiman	SEDAR
P197	Kota Samarahan	N16	Muara Tuang	Idris Buang (GPS)	Idris Buang	PBB	Daud Eali	AMANAH	None		Ismawi Muhammad	IND
P197	Kota Samarahan	N17	Stakan	Mohamad Ali Mahmud (GPS)	Hamzah Brahim	PBB	Leslie Ting Xiang Zhi	DAP	None		George Young Si Ricord Junior	PSB
P197	Kota Samarahan	N17	Stakan	Mohamad Ali Mahmud (GPS)	Hamzah Brahim	PBB	Leslie Ting Xiang Zhi	DAP	None		Atet Dego	PBK
P198	Puncak Borneo	N18	Serembu	Miro Simuh (GPS)	Miro Simuh	PBB	Michael Sawing	PKR	Buln Ribos	ASPIRASI	Iana Akam	PSB
P198	Puncak Borneo	N18	Serembu	Miro Simuh (GPS)	Miro Simuh	PBB	Michael Sawing	PKR	Buln Ribos	ASPIRASI	Jecky Misieng	PBK
P198	Puncak Borneo	N19	Mambong	Jerip Susil (GPS)	Jerip Susil	PBB	Chan Hon Hiung	DAP	Chong Siew Hung	ASPIRASI	Sanjan Daik	PSB
P198	Puncak Borneo	N19	Mambong	Jerip Susil (GPS)	Jerip Susil	PBB	Chan Hon Hiung	DAP	Chong Siew Hung	ASPIRASI	Joshua Roman	PBK
P198	Puncak Borneo	N20	Tarat	Roland Sagah Wee Inn (GPS)	Roland Sagah Wee Inn	PBB	Christo Michael	PKR	None		Dadi Tiap Juul	PSB
P198	Puncak Borneo	N20	Tarat	Roland Sagah Wee Inn (GPS)	Roland Sagah Wee Inn	PBB	Christo Michael	PKR	None		Edison Jamang	PBK
P198	Puncak Borneo	N20	Tarat	Roland Sagah Wee Inn (GPS)	Roland Sagah Wee Inn	PBB	Christo Michael	PKR	None		Bai Dungak	IND
P199	Serian	N21	Tebedu	Michael Manyin Jawong (GPS)	Simon Sinang Bada	PBB	Senior William Rade	PKR	None		Cheyne Kambeng	PSB
P199	Serian	N21	Tebedu	Michael Manyin Jawong (GPS)	Simon Sinang Bada	PBB	Senior William Rade	PKR	None		Jonathan Lantik	PBK
P199	Serian	N21	Tebedu	Michael Manyin Jawong (GPS)	Simon Sinang Bada	PBB	Senior William Rade	PKR	None		Roland Bangu	IND
P199	Serian	N22	Kedup	Maclaine Ben (GPS)	Maclaine Ben	PBB	Laerry Jabong	DAP	None		Dominic Dado Sagin	PSB
P199	Serian	N22	Kedup	Maclaine Ben (GPS)	Maclaine Ben	PBB	Laerry Jabong	DAP	None		Stephen Morgan Sugan	PBK
P199	Serian	N23	Bukit Semuja	John Ilus (GPS)	John Ilus	PBB	Brolin Nicholsion Benedict Achung	DAP	None		Elsiy Tingang	PSB
P199	Serian	N23	Bukit Semuja	John Ilus (GPS)	John Ilus	PBB	Brolin Nicholsion Benedict Achung	DAP	None		Edward Andrew Luak	PBK
P200	Batang Sadong	N24	Sadong Jaya	Aidel Lariwoo (GPS)	Aidel Lariwoo	PBB	Piee Bin Ling	PKR	None		Nur Khairunisa Abdullah	PSB
P200	Batang Sadong	N24	Sadong Jaya	Aidel Lariwoo (GPS)	Aidel Lariwoo	PBB	Piee Bin Ling	PKR	None		Jolhi Bee	PBK
P200	Batang Sadong	N25	Simunjan	Awla Dris (GPS)	Awla Dris	PBB	Hapeni Fadil	PKR	None		Raily Ali	PSB
P200	Batang Sadong	N25	Simunjan	Awla Dris (GPS)	Awla Dris	PBB	Hapeni Fadil	PKR	None		Saharuddin Abdullah	PBK
P200	Batang Sadong	N26	Gedong	Naroden Majais (GPS)	Abang Johari	PBB	Kamal Bujang	AMANAH	None		Mohamad Sofian Fariz Sharbini	PSB
P200	Batang Sadong	N26	Gedong	Naroden Majais (GPS)	Abang Johari	PBB	Kamal Bujang	AMANAH	None		Tomson Ango	PBK
P201	Batang Lupar	N27	Sebuyau	Julaihi Narawi (GPS)	Julaihi Narawi	PBB	Wel @ Maxwel Rojis	AMANAH	None		Wan Chee Wan Mahjar	PBK
P201	Batang Lupar	N28	Lingga	Simoi Peri (GPS)	Dayang Noorazah Awang Sohor	PBB	Abang Abdul Kasim Abang Bujang	PKR	None		Wan Abdillah Edruce Wan Abdul Rahman	PSB
P201	Batang Lupar	N28	Lingga	Simoi Peri (GPS)	Dayang Noorazah Awang Sohor	PBB	Abang Abdul Kasim Abang Bujang	PKR	None		Baha Iman	PBK
P201	Batang Lupar	N28	Lingga	Simoi Peri (GPS)	Dayang Noorazah Awang Sohor	PBB	Abang Abdul Kasim Abang Bujang	PKR	None		Abang Ahmad Abang Suni	SEDAR
P201	Batang Lupar	N28	Lingga	Simoi Peri (GPS)	Dayang Noorazah Awang Sohor	PBB	Abang Abdul Kasim Abang Bujang	PKR	None		Mohd Sepian Abang Daud	IND
P201	Batang Lupar	N29	Beting Maro	Razaili Gapor (GPS)	Razaili Gapor	PBB	Abang Zulkifli Abang Engkeh	PKR	None		Jackie Chiew	PBK
P201	Batang Lupar	N29	Beting Maro	Razaili Gapor (GPS)	Razaili Gapor	PBB	Abang Zulkifli Abang Engkeh	PKR	None		Mohammad Arifiriazul Paijo	PAS
P201	Batang Lupar	N29	Beting Maro	Razaili Gapor (GPS)	Razaili Gapor	PBB	Abang Zulkifli Abang Engkeh	PKR	None		Safiudin Matsah	IND
P202	Sri Aman	N30	Balai Ringin	Snowdan Lawan (GPS)	Snowdan Lawan	PRS	None		None		Masir Kujat	PSB
P202	Sri Aman	N30	Balai Ringin	Snowdan Lawan (GPS)	Snowdan Lawan	PRS	None		None		Kasim Mana	PBK
P202	Sri Aman	N31	Bukit Begunan	Mong Dagang (GPS)	Mong Dagang	PRS	None		Entusa Iman	PBDSB	Norina Umoi Utot	PSB
P202	Sri Aman	N31	Bukit Begunan	Mong Dagang (GPS)	Mong Dagang	PRS	None		Entusa Iman	PBDSB	Winton Langgang	PBK
P202	Sri Aman	N32	Simanggang	Francis Harden Hollis (GPS)	Francis Harden Hollis	SUPP	Leon Jimat Donald	DAP	None		Wilson Entabang	PSB
P202	Sri Aman	N32	Simanggang	Francis Harden Hollis (GPS)	Francis Harden Hollis	SUPP	Leon Jimat Donald	DAP	None		Peli Aron	PBK
P203	Lubok Antu	N33	Engkilili	Johnical Rayong Ngipa (PSB)	Desmond Sateng Sanjan	SUPP	None		None		Johnical Rayong Ngipa	PSB
P203	Lubok Antu	N33	Engkilili	Johnical Rayong Ngipa (PSB)	Desmond Sateng Sanjan	SUPP	None		None		Stel Datu	PBK
P203	Lubok Antu	N33	Engkilili	Johnical Rayong Ngipa (PSB)	Desmond Sateng Sanjan	SUPP	None		None		Gemong Batu	IND
P203	Lubok Antu	N34	Batang Ai	Malcom Mussen Lamoh (GPS)	Malcom Mussen Lamoh	PRS	None		None		William Nyallau Badak	PSB
P203	Lubok Antu	N34	Batang Ai	Malcom Mussen Lamoh (GPS)	Malcom Mussen Lamoh	PRS	None		None		Usup Asun	PBK
P203	Lubok Antu	N34	Batang Ai	Malcom Mussen Lamoh (GPS)	Malcom Mussen Lamoh	PRS	None		None		John Linang Mereejon	IND
P204	Betong	N35	Saribas	Ricky Sitam (GPS)	Ricky Sitam	PBB	Patek Kamis	PKR	None		Melaini Bolhassan	PSB
P204	Betong	N35	Saribas	Ricky Sitam (GPS)	Ricky Sitam	PBB	Patek Kamis	PKR	None		Sim Min Leong	PBK
P204	Betong	N35	Saribas	Ricky Sitam (GPS)	Ricky Sitam	PBB	Patek Kamis	PKR	None		Kurnaen Boben	SEDAR
P204	Betong	N36	Layar	Gerald Rentap Jabu (GPS)	Gerald Rentap Jabu	PBB	None		None		Isik Utau	PSB
P204	Betong	N37	Bukit Saban	Douglas Uggah Embas (GPS)	Douglas Uggah Embas	PBB	Mikail Mathew Abdullah	PKR	None		Andria Gelayan Dundang	PSB
P205	Saratok	N38	Kalaka	Abdul Wahab Aziz (GPS)	Mohamad Duri	PBB	None		None		John Antau Linggang	PSB
P205	Saratok	N38	Kalaka	Abdul Wahab Aziz (GPS)	Mohamad Duri	PBB	None		None		Linang Chapum	PBK
P205	Saratok	N39	Krian	Ali Biju (PN)	Friday Belik	PDP	None		None		~~Ali Biju~~	IND
P205	Saratok	N39	Krian	Ali Biju (PN)	Friday Belik	PDP	None		None		Musa Dinggat	PSB
P205	Saratok	N39	Krian	Ali Biju (PN)	Friday Belik	PDP	None		None		Danny Kuan San Sui	PBK
P205	Saratok	N40	Kabong	Mohd Chee Kadir (GPS)	Mohd Chee Kadir	PBB	Hud Andri Zulkarnain	AMANAH	None		Wan Mohamad Madehi Wan Ali	PSB
P205	Saratok	N40	Kabong	Mohd Chee Kadir (GPS)	Mohd Chee Kadir	PBB	Hud Andri Zulkarnain	AMANAH	None		Mohammad Asri Kassim	PBK
P206	Tanjong Manis	N41	Kuala Rajang	Len Talif Salleh (GPS)	Len Talif Salleh	PBB	None		None		Abang Aditajaya Abang Alwi	IND
P206	Tanjong Manis	N41	Kuala Rajang	Len Talif Salleh (GPS)	Len Talif Salleh	PBB	None		None		Abdul Mutalip Abdullah	IND
P206	Tanjong Manis	N41	Kuala Rajang	Len Talif Salleh (GPS)	Len Talif Salleh	PBB	None		None		Wong Ching Ling	PBK
P206	Tanjong Manis	N42	Semop	Abdullah Saidol (GPS)	Abdullah Saidol	PBB	Mohamad Fadillah Sabali	AMANAH	None		Abdul Raafidin Majidi	PSB
P206	Tanjong Manis	N42	Semop	Abdullah Saidol (GPS)	Abdullah Saidol	PBB	Mohamad Fadillah Sabali	AMANAH	None		Jenny Wong Khing Ling	PBK
P206	Tanjong Manis	N42	Semop	Abdullah Saidol (GPS)	Abdullah Saidol	PBB	Mohamad Fadillah Sabali	AMANAH	None		Mohd Adnan Julkeppil	IND
P207	Igan	N43	Daro	Safiee Ahmad (GPS)	Safiee Ahmad	PBB	None		None		Ting Ing Hua	PBK
P207	Igan	N43	Daro	Safiee Ahmad (GPS)	Safiee Ahmad	PBB	None		None		Jamal Ibrahim	IND
P207	Igan	N44	Jemoreng	Juanda Jaya (GPS)	Juanda Jaya	PBB	Zainab Suhaili	AMANAH	None		Osman Rafaie	IND
P208	Sarikei	N45	Repok	Huang Tiong Sii (GPS)	Huang Tiong Sii	SUPP	Philip Wong Pack Ming	DAP	Wong Chin King	ASPIRASI	Wong Kung King	PBK
P208	Sarikei	N46	Meradong	Ding Kuong Hiing (GPS)	Ding Kuong Hiing	SUPP	Yong Siew Wei	DAP	None		Chris Hii Ru Yee	PSB
P208	Sarikei	N46	Meradong	Ding Kuong Hiing (GPS)	Ding Kuong Hiing	SUPP	Yong Siew Wei	DAP	None		Moh Hiong King	PBK
P209	Julau	N47	Pakan	William Mawan Ikom (GPS)	William Mawan Ikom	PBB	None		None		Hereward Gramong Joseph Allen	PSB
P209	Julau	N47	Pakan	William Mawan Ikom (GPS)	William Mawan Ikom	PBB	None		None		Jemeli Kerah	PBK
P209	Julau	N47	Pakan	William Mawan Ikom (GPS)	William Mawan Ikom	PBB	None		None		Tedong Gunda	IND
P209	Julau	N47	Pakan	William Mawan Ikom (GPS)	William Mawan Ikom	PBB	None		None		Brawi Angguong	IND
P209	Julau	N48	Meluan	Rolland Duat Jubin (GPS)	Rolland Duat Jubin	PDP	None		None		Elly Lawai Ngalai	PSB
P209	Julau	N48	Meluan	Rolland Duat Jubin (GPS)	Rolland Duat Jubin	PDP	None		None		Abdul Hamid Siong	PBK
P210	Kanowit	N49	Ngemah	Alexander Vincent (GPS)	Anyi Jana	PRS	Satu Anchom	PKR	Leo Bunsu	PBDSB	Joseph Jawa Kendawang	PSB
P210	Kanowit	N49	Ngemah	Alexander Vincent (GPS)	Anyi Jana	PRS	Satu Anchom	PKR	Leo Bunsu	PBDSB	Charlie Genam	PBK
P210	Kanowit	N50	Machan	Allan Siden Gramong (GPS)	Allan Siden Gramong	PBB	Muhammad Fauzi Joseph Usit	PKR	Ngelayang Unau	ASPIRASI	Madang Dimbab	PSB
P210	Kanowit	N50	Machan	Allan Siden Gramong (GPS)	Allan Siden Gramong	PBB	Muhammad Fauzi Joseph Usit	PKR	Ngelayang Unau	ASPIRASI	Mary Rita Mathias	PBK
P211	Lanang	N51	Bukit Assek	Irene Mary Chang Oi Ling (PH)	Joseph Chieng Jin Ek	SUPP	Irene Mary Chang Oi Ling	DAP	Jess Lau Kiu Ming	ASPIRASI	Ting Kee Nguan	PSB
P211	Lanang	N51	Bukit Assek	Irene Mary Chang Oi Ling (PH)	Joseph Chieng Jin Ek	SUPP	Irene Mary Chang Oi Ling	DAP	Jess Lau Kiu Ming	ASPIRASI	Priscilla Lau	PBK
P211	Lanang	N51	Bukit Assek	Irene Mary Chang Oi Ling (PH)	Joseph Chieng Jin Ek	SUPP	Irene Mary Chang Oi Ling	DAP	Jess Lau Kiu Ming	ASPIRASI	Hii Tiong Huat	IND
P211	Lanang	N52	Dudong	Tiong Thai King (PSB)	Tiong King Sing	PDP	Paul Ling	DAP	Josephine Lau Kiew Peng	ASPIRASI	Wong Hui Ping	PSB
P211	Lanang	N52	Dudong	Tiong Thai King (PSB)	Tiong King Sing	PDP	Paul Ling	DAP	Josephine Lau Kiew Peng	ASPIRASI	Jane Lau Sing Yee	PBK
P211	Lanang	N52	Dudong	Tiong Thai King (PSB)	Tiong King Sing	PDP	Paul Ling	DAP	Julius Enchana	PBDSB	Fadhil Mohd Isa	IND
P211	Lanang	N52	Dudong	Tiong Thai King (PSB)	Tiong King Sing	PDP	Paul Ling	DAP	Julius Enchana	PBDSB	Engga Unchat	IND
P212	Sibu	N53	Bawang Assan	Wong Soon Koh (PSB)	Robert Lau Hui Yew	SUPP	Amy Lau Bik Yin	DAP	None		Wong Soon Koh	PSB
P212	Sibu	N53	Bawang Assan	Wong Soon Koh (PSB)	Robert Lau Hui Yew	SUPP	Amy Lau Bik Yin	DAP	None		Michelle Ling Shyan Mih	PBK
P212	Sibu	N53	Bawang Assan	Wong Soon Koh (PSB)	Robert Lau Hui Yew	SUPP	Amy Lau Bik Yin	DAP	None		Ricky Enteri	IND
P212	Sibu	N54	Pelawan	David Wong Kee Woan (PH)	Michael Tiang Ming Tee	SUPP	David Wong Kee Woan	DAP	Janet Loh Wui Ping	ASPIRASI	Low Chong Nguan	PSB
P212	Sibu	N54	Pelawan	David Wong Kee Woan (PH)	Michael Tiang Ming Tee	SUPP	David Wong Kee Woan	DAP	Janet Loh Wui Ping	ASPIRASI	Jamie Tiew Yen Houng	PBK
P212	Sibu	N55	Nangka	Annuar Rapaee (GPS)	Annuar Rapaee	PBB	None		None		Intanurazean Wan Sapuan Daud	PSB
P212	Sibu	N55	Nangka	Annuar Rapaee (GPS)	Annuar Rapaee	PBB	None		None		Olivia Lim Wen Sia	PBK
P213	Mukah	N56	Dalat	Fatimah Abdullah (GPS)	Fatimah Abdullah	PBB	None		None		Salleh Mahali	PBK
P213	Mukah	N57	Tellian	Yussibnosh Balo (GPS)	Royston Valentine	PBB	Mohd Arwin Abdullah	PKR	None		Sait Junaidi	PSB
P213	Mukah	N57	Tellian	Yussibnosh Balo (GPS)	Royston Valentine	PBB	Mohd Arwin Abdullah	PKR	None		Zainuddin Budug	PBK
P213	Mukah	N58	Balingian	Abdul Yakub Arbi (GPS)	Abdul Yakub Arbi	PBB	Abdul Jalil Bujang	PKR	None		Yusuf Abdul Rahman	PSB
P214	Selangau	N59	Tamin	Christopher Gira Sambang (GPS)	Christopher Gira Sambang	PRS	None		None		Joseph Entulu Belaun	PSB
P214	Selangau	N60	Kakus	John Sikie Tayai (GPS)	John Sikie Tayai	PRS	Joshua Jabeng	PKR	None		Peter Tuan	PSB
P214	Selangau	N60	Kakus	John Sikie Tayai (GPS)	John Sikie Tayai	PRS	Joshua Jabeng	PKR	None		Philip Kelanang	PSB
P214	Selangau	N60	Kakus	John Sikie Tayai (GPS)	John Sikie Tayai	PRS	Joshua Jabeng	PKR	None		Ugik Selipeh	IND
P214	Selangau	N60	Kakus	John Sikie Tayai (GPS)	John Sikie Tayai	PRS	Joshua Jabeng	PKR	None		Tiun Kanun	IND
P215	Kapit	N61	Pelagus	Wilson Nyabong Ijang (GPS)	Wilson Nyabong Ijang	PRS	Solomon Kumbong	DAP	Moses Ripai	PBDSB	Kristoffer Nyuak Bajok	PSB
P215	Kapit	N61	Pelagus	Wilson Nyabong Ijang (GPS)	Wilson Nyabong Ijang	PRS	Solomon Kumbong	DAP	Moses Ripai	PBDSB	Nyambong Sibat	PBK
P215	Kapit	N62	Katibas	Ambrose Blikau Enturan (GPS)	Lidam Assan	PBB	Munan Laja	PKR	Sai Malaka	PBDSB	Robertson Mawa Luat	PSB
P215	Kapit	N62	Katibas	Ambrose Blikau Enturan (GPS)	Lidam Assan	PBB	Munan Laja	PKR	Sai Malaka	PBDSB	Yunus Basri	PBK
P215	Kapit	N62	Katibas	Ambrose Blikau Enturan (GPS)	Lidam Assan	PBB	Munan Laja	PKR	Sai Malaka	PBDSB	Tengku Geruna	IND
P215	Kapit	N63	Bukit Goram	Jefferson Jamit Unyat (GPS)	Jefferson Jamit Unyat	PBB	Joseph Jinggut	DAP	Robert Saweng	PBDSB	Robert Segie	PSB
P215	Kapit	N63	Bukit Goram	Jefferson Jamit Unyat (GPS)	Jefferson Jamit Unyat	PBB	Joseph Jinggut	DAP	Robert Saweng	PBDSB	Puso Bujang	PBK
P216	Hulu Rajang	N64	Baleh	Vacant	Nicholas Kudi Jantai Masing	PRS	Kenneth Usang George	DAP	None		Koh Kumbong	PSB
P216	Hulu Rajang	N64	Baleh	Vacant	Nicholas Kudi Jantai Masing	PRS	Kenneth Usang George	DAP	None		Sukarno Layau Mayau @ Iskandar Abdullah	PBK
P216	Hulu Rajang	N65	Belaga	Liwan Lagang (GPS)	Liwan Lagang	PRS	None		None		Henry Usat Bit	PSB
P216	Hulu Rajang	N65	Belaga	Liwan Lagang (GPS)	Liwan Lagang	PRS	None		None		John Bampa	PBK
P216	Hulu Rajang	N65	Belaga	Liwan Lagang (GPS)	Liwan Lagang	PRS	None		None		Siki Balarik	IND
P216	Hulu Rajang	N66	Murum	Kennedy Chukpai Ugon (GPS)	Kennedy Chukpai Ugon	PRS	Ani Amat	PKR	Kenneth Adan Silek	PBDSB	Stanley Ajang Batok	PSB
P217	Bintulu	N67	Jepak	Talib Zulpilip (GPS)	Talib Zulpilip	PBB	None		None		Raba'ah Tudin	PSB
P217	Bintulu	N67	Jepak	Talib Zulpilip (GPS)	Talib Zulpilip	PBB	None		None		Stevenson Joseph Sumbang	PBK
P217	Bintulu	N67	Jepak	Talib Zulpilip (GPS)	Talib Zulpilip	PBB	None		None		Ani Kazan	IND
P217	Bintulu	N68	Tanjong Batu	Chiew Chiu Sing (PH)	Johny Pang Leong Ming	SUPP	Chiew Chan Yew	DAP	Chieng Lea Phing	ASPIRASI	Nicholas Tang Eng Hui	PSB
P217	Bintulu	N68	Tanjong Batu	Chiew Chiu Sing (PH)	Johny Pang Leong Ming	SUPP	Chiew Chan Yew	DAP	Chieng Lea Phing	ASPIRASI	Andy Yek Hock Siang	PBK
P217	Bintulu	N68	Tanjong Batu	Chiew Chiu Sing (PH)	Johny Pang Leong Ming	SUPP	Chiew Chan Yew	DAP	Chieng Lea Phing	ASPIRASI	Wong Hau Ming	IND
P217	Bintulu	N69	Kemena	Stephen Rundi Utom (GPS)	Stephen Rundi Utom	PBB	John Bryan Anthony	DAP	None		Bernard Tahim Bael	PSB
P217	Bintulu	N69	Kemena	Stephen Rundi Utom (GPS)	Stephen Rundi Utom	PBB	John Bryan Anthony	DAP	None		Chelea Vanissa William	PBK
P217	Bintulu	N69	Kemena	Stephen Rundi Utom (GPS)	Stephen Rundi Utom	PBB	John Bryan Anthony	DAP	None		Jame Stephen Randi Sekalai	IND
P217	Bintulu	N70	Samalaju	Majang Renggi (GPS)	Majang Renggi	PRS	Tony Ung	DAP	Baba Emperam	PBDSB	Reggie Suel	PSB
P217	Bintulu	N70	Samalaju	Majang Renggi (GPS)	Majang Renggi	PRS	Tony Ung	DAP	Baba Emperam	PBDSB	Leighton Manjah	PBK
P218	Sibuti	N71	Bekenu	Rosey Yunus (GPS)	Rosey Yunus	PBB	Norhafizah Mohammad Joharie	PKR	None		Abu Bakar Amit	PSB
P218	Sibuti	N71	Bekenu	Rosey Yunus (GPS)	Rosey Yunus	PBB	Norhafizah Mohammad Joharie	PKR	None		Desmond Ghani Pengiran	PBK
P218	Sibuti	N72	Lambir	Ripin Lamat (GPS)	Ripin Lamat	PBB	Zolhaidah Suboh	PKR	None		Lila Mohamad	PSB
P218	Sibuti	N72	Lambir	Ripin Lamat (GPS)	Ripin Lamat	PBB	Zolhaidah Suboh	PKR	None		Dyanne Oshield Nickson	PBK
P219	Miri	N73	Piasau	Sebastian Ting Chiew Yew (GPS)	Sebastian Ting Chiew Yew	SUPP	Peter Hee Leh Keng	DAP	Hanim Jaraee	ASPIRASI	Steve Teo Jia Jun	PSB
P219	Miri	N73	Piasau	Sebastian Ting Chiew Yew (GPS)	Sebastian Ting Chiew Yew	SUPP	Peter Hee Leh Keng	DAP	Hanim Jaraee	ASPIRASI	Devora Chung Shiew Yen	PBK
P219	Miri	N74	Pujut	Vacant	Adam Yii Siew Sang	SUPP	Alan Ling Sie Kiong	DAP	Erick Chin Fen Siong	ASPIRASI	Bruce Chai Khim Cheong	PSB
P219	Miri	N74	Pujut	Vacant	Adam Yii Siew Sang	SUPP	Alan Ling Sie Kiong	DAP	Erick Chin Fen Siong	ASPIRASI	Leslie Ting Siong Ngiap	PBK
P219	Miri	N75	Senadin	Lee Kim Shin (GPS)	Lee Kim Shin	SUPP	Marcus Hugo	DAP	Bobby William	PBDSB	Suzanne Lee Tze Ha	PSB
P219	Miri	N75	Senadin	Lee Kim Shin (GPS)	Lee Kim Shin	SUPP	Marcus Hugo	DAP	Bobby William	PBDSB	Eric Ngieng Sheng Jun	PBK
P220	Baram	N76	Marudi	Penguang Manggil (GPS)	Penguang Manggil	PDP	Elias Lipi Mat	PKR	Sawing Kedit	PBDSB	Sylvester Entri Muran	PSB
P220	Baram	N76	Marudi	Penguang Manggil (GPS)	Penguang Manggil	PDP	Elias Lipi Mat	PKR	Sawing Kedit	PBDSB	Pierre Gilbert Yong	PBK
P220	Baram	N77	Telang Usan	Dennis Ngau (GPS)	Dennis Ngau	PBB	Philip Jau Ding	PKR	None		Jau Jok	PSB
P220	Baram	N77	Telang Usan	Dennis Ngau (GPS)	Dennis Ngau	PBB	Philip Jau Ding	PKR	None		Gia Bala	PBK
P220	Baram	N78	Mulu	Gerawat Gala (GPS)	Gerawat Gala	PBB	Roland Engan	PKR	None		Son Radu	PSB
P220	Baram	N78	Mulu	Gerawat Gala (GPS)	Gerawat Gala	PBB	Roland Engan	PKR	None		Richard Ibuh	PBK
P221	Limbang	N79	Bukit Kota	Abdul Rahman Ismail (GPS)	Abdul Rahman Ismail	PBB	None		None		Rosli Amat	PSB
P221	Limbang	N79	Bukit Kota	Abdul Rahman Ismail (GPS)	Abdul Rahman Ismail	PBB	None		None		Lim Lian Hun	PBK
P221	Limbang	N79	Bukit Kota	Abdul Rahman Ismail (GPS)	Abdul Rahman Ismail	PBB	None		None		Herun Bungsu	IND
P221	Limbang	N80	Batu Danau	Paulus Palu Gumbang (GPS)	Paulus Palu Gumbang	PBB	Racha Balang	PKR	None		Ali Adap	PSB
P221	Limbang	N80	Batu Danau	Paulus Palu Gumbang (GPS)	Paulus Palu Gumbang	PBB	Racha Balang	PKR	None		Petrus Bulan	PBK
P222	Lawas	N81	Ba'kelalan	Baru Bian (PSB)	Sam Laya	PDP	Martin Samuel Labo	PKR	None		Baru Bian	PSB
P222	Lawas	N81	Ba'kelalan	Baru Bian (PSB)	Sam Laya	PDP	Martin Samuel Labo	PKR	None		Pita Asut	PBK
P222	Lawas	N81	Ba'kelalan	Baru Bian (PSB)	Sam Laya	PDP	Martin Samuel Labo	PKR	None		Agnes Padan	IND
P222	Lawas	N82	Bukit Sari	Awang Tengah Ali Hasan (GPS)	Awang Tengah Ali Hasan	PBB	None		None		Alias Mail	PSB
P222	Lawas	N82	Bukit Sari	Awang Tengah Ali Hasan (GPS)	Awang Tengah Ali Hasan	PBB	None		None		Riyah Basrah	PBK

== Results ==
Party or alliance		Votes	%	Seats	+/–
Gabungan Parti Sarawak	Parti Pesaka Bumiputera Bersatu	271,718	36.41	47	0
Gabungan Parti Sarawak	Sarawak United Peoples' Party	100,047	13.40	13	+6
Gabungan Parti Sarawak	Parti Rakyat Sarawak	50,423	6.76	11	0
Gabungan Parti Sarawak	Progressive Democratic Party	35,045	4.70	5	+2
Gabungan Parti Sarawak	Total	457,233	61.26	76	+8
Parti Sarawak Bersatu		139,515	18.69	4	New
Pakatan Harapan	Democratic Action Party	55,308	7.41	2	–3
Pakatan Harapan	People's Justice Party	19,865	2.66	0	0
Pakatan Harapan	National Trust Party	3,024	0.41	0	0
Pakatan Harapan	Total	78,197	10.48	2	–3
Parti Bumi Kenyalang		40,763	5.46	0	New
Gabungan Anak Sarawak	Parti Bansa Dayak Sarawak Baru	2,972	0.40	0	0
Gabungan Anak Sarawak	Parti Aspirasi Rakyat Sarawak	2,525	0.34	0	0
Gabungan Anak Sarawak	Total	5,497	0.74	0	–3
Perikatan Nasional	Pan-Malaysian Islamic Party	2,058	0.28	0	0
Parti Sedar Rakyat Sarawak		1,204	0.16	0	New
Independents		21,882	2.93	0	–1
Total		746,349	100.00	82	0
Valid votes		746,349	98.25		
Invalid/blank votes		13,278	1.75		
Total votes		759,627	100.00		
Registered voters/turnout		1,252,014	60.67		
Source: Dashboard SPR

↓
Gabungan Parti Sarawak government (76)				PSB-led opposition (6)*
76				4	2
Gabungan Parti Sarawak				PSB	PH
47	13	11	5	4	2
PBB	SUPP	PRS	PDP	PSB	DAP
Sarawak State Legislative Assembly, 18 December 2021 (82 seats)

=== Seats that changed allegiance ===
State constituency		Before	After
N01	Opar	Parti Sarawak Bersatu	Gabungan Parti Sarawak (SUPP)
N12	Kota Sentosa	Pakatan Harapan (DAP)	Gabungan Parti Sarawak (SUPP)
N39	Krian	Perikatan Nasional (BERSATU)	Gabungan Parti Sarawak (PDP)
N51	Bukit Assek	Pakatan Harapan (DAP)	Gabungan Parti Sarawak (SUPP)
N52	Dudong	Parti Sarawak Bersatu	Gabungan Parti Sarawak (PDP)
N54	Pelawan	Pakatan Harapan (DAP)	Gabungan Parti Sarawak (SUPP)
N68	Tanjong Batu	Pakatan Harapan (DAP)	Gabungan Parti Sarawak (SUPP)
N74	Pujut	Pakatan Harapan (DAP)	Gabungan Parti Sarawak (SUPP)

== Election pendulum ==
Pre-election pendulum

GOVERNMENT SEATS
Seat	Member	Party	Margin
Marginal
Meluan	Rolland Duat Jubin	PDP	37.40
Ngemah	Alexander Vincent	PRS	46.13
Dudong	Tiong Thai King (PSB)	BN	46.36
Opar	Ranum Mina (PSB)	BN	50.06
Serembu	Miro Simuh (PBB)	BN	50.43
Simanggang	Francis Harden Hollis	SUPP	50.70
Pakan	William Mawan Ikom	PBB	50.90
Telang Usan	Dennis Ngau	PBB	51.33
Repok	Huang Tiong Sii	SUPP	51.96
Mambong	Jerip Susil (PBB)	BN	52.96
Batu Kitang	Ir. Lo Khere Chiang	SUPP	53.48
Murum	Chukpai Ugon	PRS	54.00
Batu Kawah	Prof. Dr. Sim Kui Hian	SUPP	54.12
Tamin	Christopher Gira Sambang	PRS	54.99
Tasik Biru	Harry @ Henry Jinep	PDP	55.13
Fairly safe
Meradong	Ding Kuong Hiing	SUPP	56.21
Marudi	Penguang Manggil	PDP	56.89
Piasau	Sebastian Ting Chiew Yew	SUPP	57.83
Balai Ringin	Snowdan Lawan	PRS	58.10
Senadin	Lee Kim Shin	SUPP	58.84
Bukit Semuja	John Ilus (PBB)	BN	59.64
Safe
Beting Maro	Razaili Gapor	PBB	60.14
Machan	Allan Siden Gramong	PBB	60.43
Mulu	Gerawat Jala (PBB)	BN	61.08
Layar	Gerald Rentap Jabu	PBB	61.10
Samalaju	Majang Renggi	PRS	61.34
Bawang Assan	Wong Soon Koh (PSB)	BN	61.62
Lingga	Simoi Peri	PBB	66.84
Lambir	Ripin Lamat	PBB	68.66
Jepak	Talib Zulpilip	PBB	68.82
Bukit Goram	Jefferson Jamit Unyat	PBB	69.57
Sebuyau	Julaihi Narawi	PBB	69.88
Engkilili	Johnical Rayong Ngipa (PSB)	BN	70.75
Simunjan	Awla Idris	PBB	71.14
Bekenu	Rosey Yunus (PBB)	BN	71.68
Kedup	Martin Ben	PBB	73.23
Tarat	Roland Sagah Wee Inn	PBB	73.61
Katibas	Ambrose Blikau Enturan	PBB	74.20
Batang Ai	Malcom Mussen Lamoh	PRS	74.20
Asajaya	Abdul Karim Rahman Hamzah	PBB	74.72
Kakus	John Sikie Tayai	PRS	75.21
Batu Danau	Paulus Gumbang (PBB)	BN	75.37
Kemena	Stephen Rundi Utom	PBB	75.58
Balingian	Abdul Yakub Arbi	PBB	77.18
Kabong	Mohamad Chee Kadir	PBB	77.35
Jemoreng	Dr. Juanda Jaya	PBB	77.43
Kalaka	Abdul Wahab Aziz	PBB	77.57
Nangka	Dr. Annuar Rapaee	PBB	77.62
Gedong	Mohd. Naroden Majais	PBB	78.77
Satok	Abang Johari	PBB	79.12
Tupong	Fazzrudin Abdul Rahman	PBB	79.12
Saribas	Mohammad Razi Sitam	PBB	79.57
Samariang	Sharifah Hasidah Sayeed Aman Ghazali	PBB	80.16
Muara Tuang	Idris Buang	PBB	81.61
Sadong Jaya	Aidel Lariwoo	PBB	82.22
Pelagus	Wilsong Nyabong Ijang	PRS	82.26
Stakan	Mohamad Ali Mahmud	PBB	83.22
Bukit Saban	Douglas Uggah Embas	PBB	85.66
Semop	Abdullah Saidol	PBB	85.77
Tebedu	Michael Manyin Jawong	PBB	86.34
Bukit Begunan	Mong Dagang	PRS	86.65
Pantai Damai	Dr. Abdul Rahman Junaidi	PBB	86.62
Demak Laut	Dr. Hazland Abang Hipni	PBB	88.07
Tellian	Yussibnosh Balo	PBB	88.42
Kuala Rajang	Len Talif Salleh	PBB	88.60
Daro	Safiee Ahmad	PBB	89.78
Belaga	Liwan Lagang	PRS	89.96
Dalat	Fatimah Abdullah @ Ting Sai Ming	PBB	90.14
Baleh	Dr. James Jemut Masing	PRS	91.67
Tanjong Datu	Jamilah Anu	PBB	93.15
Uncontested
Bukit Kota	Dr. Abdul Rahman Ismail	PBB	n/a
Bukit Sari	Awang Tengah Ali Hassan	PBB	n/a

NON-GOVERNMENT SEATS
Seat	Member	Party	Margin
Marginal
Pujut	Vacant	DAP	52.57
Ba'kelalan	Baru Bian (PSB)	PKR	55.20
Fairly safe
Kota Sentosa	Chong Chieng Jen	DAP	58.16
Pelawan	David Wong Kee Woan	DAP	58.30
Krian	Ali Biju (BERSATU)	PKR	58.98
Tanjong Batu	Chiew Chiu Sing	DAP	59.10
Safe
Bukit Assek	Irene Mary Chang Oi Ling	DAP	61.05
Batu Lintang	See Chee How (PSB)	PKR	61.61
Pending	Violet Yong Wui Wui	DAP	62.60
Padungan	Wong King Wei (Ind)	DAP	64.31

Post-election pendulum

GOVERNMENT SEATS
Seat	Member	Party	Margin
Marginal
Pelawan	Michael Tiang Ming Tee	SUPP	27.70
Bukit Assek	Joseph Chieng Jin Ek	SUPP	34.94
Tanjong Batu	Johnny Pang Leong Ming	SUPP	35.38
Pakan	William Mawan Ikom	PBB	41.13
Kota Sentosa	Wilfred Yap Yau Sin	SUPP	43.05
Krian	Friday Belik	PDP	43.67
Batang Ai	Malcolm Mussen Lamoh	PRS	44.59
Pujut	Adam Yii Siew Sang	SUPP	44.86
Ngemah	Anyi Jana	PRS	46.23
Opar	Billy Sujang	SUPP	46.77
Dudong	Tiong King Sing	PDP	46.99
Simanggang	Francis Harden Hollis	SUPP	48.94
Beting Maro	Razaili Gapor	PBB	51.62
Mambong	Jerip Susil	PBB	52.00
Kakus	John Sikie Tayai	PRS	52.35
Batu Danau	Paulus Palu Gumbang	PBB	53.14
Meluan	Rolland Duat Jubin	PDP	53.21
Machan	Allan Siden Gramong	PBB	53.66
Tasik Biru	Henry Harry Jinep	PDP	53.71
Fairly safe
Pelagus	Wilson Nyabong Ijang	PRS	56.29
Balai Ringin	Snowdan Lawan	PRS	56.38
Batu Kitang	Lo Khere Chiang	SUPP	57.66
Serembu	Miro Simuh	PBB	57.69
Lingga	Dayang Noorazah Awang Sohor	PBB	58.10
Meradong	Ding Kuong Hiing	SUPP	58.24
Bukit Begunan	Mong Dagang	PRS	58.69
Telang Usan	Dennis Ngau	PBB	59.76
Safe
Tarat	Roland Sagah Wee Inn	PBB	60.25
Tebedu	Simon Sinang Bada	PBB	61.82
Baleh	Nicholas Kudi Jantai	PRS	61.85
Senadin	Lee Kim Shin	SUPP	62.30
Kemena	Stephen Rundi Utom	PBB	62.82
Kedup	Martin Ben	PBB	63.34
Muara Tuang	Idris Buang	PBB	63.63
Semop	Abdullah Saidol	PBB	64.58
Tamin	Christopher Gira Sambang	PRS	64.99
Katibas	Lidam Assan	PBB	64.62
Saribas	Razi Sitam	PBB	65.52
Murum	Kennedy Chukpai Ugon	PRS	66.23
Piasau	Sebastian Ting Chiew Yew	SUPP	66.61
Mulu	Gerawat Gala	PBB	66.67
Samalaju	Majang Renggi	PRS	67.05
Kabong	Mohd Chee Kadir	PBB	67.32
Layar	Gerald Rentap Jabu	PBB	67.75
Bukit Goram	Jefferson Jamit Unyat	PBB	68.45
Lambir	Ripin Lamat	PBB	69.15
Jepak	Talib Zulpilip	PBB	69.44
Asajaya	Abdul Karim Rahman Hamzah	PBB	70.04
Bukit Semuja	John Ilus	PBB	70.06
Tellian	Royston Valentine	PBB	70.10
Batu Kawah	Sim Kui Hian	SUPP	70.20
Kuala Rajang	Len Talif Salleh	PBB	70.35
Belaga	Liwan Lagang	PRS	70.52
Balingian	Abdul Yakub Arbi	PBB	71.13
Kalaka	Mohamad Duri	PBB	72.43
Stakan	Hamzah Brahim	PBB	72.45
Simunjan	Awla Dris	PBB	73.02
Repok	Huang Tiong Sii	SUPP	73.15
Marudi	Penguang Manggil	PDP	74.53
Bukit Saban	Douglas Uggah Embas	PBB	77.94
Demak Laut	Hazland Abang Hipni	PBB	78.25
Bukit Kota	Abdul Rahman Ismail	PBB	78.80
Sebuyau	Julaihi Narawi	PBB	79.30
Tanjong Datu	Azizul Annuar Adenan	PBB	79.39
Bekenu	Rosey Yunus	PBB	79.58
Gedong	Abang Johari	PBB	81.88
Pantai Damai	Abdul Rahman Junaidi	PBB	82.19
Sadong Jaya	Aidel Lariwoo	PBB	82.96
Satok	Ibrahim Baki	PBB	83.58
Nangka	Annuar Rapaee	PBB	84.09
Tupong	Fazzrudin Abdul Rahman	PBB	85.24
Jemoreng	Juanda Jaya	PBB	86.80
Bukit Sari	Awang Tengah Ali Hasan	PBB	87.48
Samariang	Sharifah Hasidah Sayeed Aman Ghazali	PBB	87.61
Daro	Safiee Ahmad	PBB	93.18
Dalat	Fatimah Abdullah	PBB	93.90

NON-GOVERNMENT SEATS
Seat	Member	Party	Margin
Marginal
Batu Lintang	See Chee How	PSB	35.86
Pending	Violet Yong Wui Wui	DAP	40.29
Bawang Assan	Wong Soon Koh	PSB	43.25
Engkilili	Johnical Rayong Ngipa	PSB	43.48
Padungan	Chong Chieng Jen	DAP	50.40
Ba'kelalan	Baru Bian	PSB	54.66

== Aftermath ==
Abang Johari were sworn in as the Chief Minister before the Yang di-Pertua Negeri at The Astana, Sarawak in the night of the election, even before Election Commission released the final tally of all the votes, as it was confirmed by EC that GPS has won the election with a supermajority. His cabinet, announced on 30 December, were sworn in on 4 January 2022 at the Sarawak Legislative Assembly building, in a historic virtual ceremony before the Yang di-Pertua Negeri, via video conference from The Astana, as Covid-19 restrictions were still in force.

Wong Soon Koh, the president of PSB and MLA for Bawang Assan, were appointed as Sarawak State Opposition Leader.

See Chee How, the MLA for Batu Lintang, announced on 12 August 2022 that he is leaving PSB and becoming an independent MLA, leaving PSB with 3 MLAs and the Opposition with 5 MLAs in the Legislative Assembly.

On 6 April 2024, Wong confirmed that the Registrar of Societies had approved the application of PSB to be dissolved on 19 March 2024 and all 80,000 PSB members had joined the PDP upon the dissolution. PDP President Tiong King Sing also appointed Wong as the Senior Vice President, Johnical Rayong Ngipa and Baru Bian as Vice Presidents of PDP. Upon the dissolution of PSB and the joining of its members in GPS, which was the state ruling coalition, Chong Chieng Jen of DAP took office as the Sarawak State Opposition Leader for the second term after the Sarawak opposition was left with only PH (DAP) who were represented by only two MLAs Chong himself who was the Padungan MLA and Pending MLA Violet Yong Wui Wui. GPS also increased its seat to 79 of the 82 seats in the State Assembly, after remaining 3 of PSB's MLAs joined PDP.
