= Divisions of Malaysia =

Regions of Sabah and Sarawak

Divisions (Malay: bahagian) are the primary subdivisions of Sabah and Sarawak, the states in East Malaysia. Each of the 17 divisions is subdivided into districts (daerah) — this is different in Peninsular Malaysia whereby districts are generally the primary subdivisions of a state. Each division is headed by a resident (pegawai residen).

== Sabah ==

Division	District	Capital	Council	Population (2020)	Area (km^{2})	Density
Interior	Beaufort District	Beaufort	Beaufort D	75716	1735	43.6
Interior	Keningau District	Keningau	Keningau D	150927	3533	42.7
Interior	Kuala Penyu District	Kuala Penyu	Kuala Penyu D	23710	453	52.3
Interior	Membakut District (Note: gazetted as full district on March 30, 2022)	Membakut	Beaufort D			
Interior	Nabawan District	Nabawan	Nabawan D	28349	6089	4.7
Interior	Sipitang District	Sipitang	Sipitang D	37828	2732	13.8
Interior	Sook District	Sook	Keningau D			
Interior	Tambunan District	Tambunan	Tambunan D	31573	1347	23.4
Interior	Tenom District	Tenom	Tenom D	51328	2409	21.3
Kudat	Kota Marudu District	Kota Marudu	Kota Marudu D	69528	1917	36.3
Kudat	Kudat District	Kudat	Kudat D	86410	1287	67.1
Kudat	Pitas District	Pitas	Pitas D	36660	1419	25.8
Sandakan	Beluran District	Beluran	Beluran D	77125	5498	14.0
Sandakan	Kinabatangan District	Kinabatangan	Kinabatangan D	143112	6605	21.7
Sandakan	Paitan District	Paitan	Beluran D			
Sandakan	Sandakan District	Sandakan	Sandakan M	439050	2266	193.8
Sandakan	Telupid District	Telupid	Telupid D	29241	2210	13.2
Sandakan	Tongod District	Tongod	Kinabatangan D	42742	10054	4.3
Tawau
Tawau	Kalabakan District	Kalabakan	Kalabakan D	48195	3885	12.4
Tawau	Kunak District	Kunak	Kunak D	68891	1134	60.8
Tawau	Lahad Datu District	Lahad Datu	Lahad Datu D	229138	7444	30.8
Tawau	Semporna District	Semporna	Semporna D	166587	1145	145.5
Tawau	Tawau District	Tawau	Tawau M	372615	2240	166.3
West Coast	Kota Belud District	Kota Belud	Kota Belud D	107243	1386	77.4
West Coast	Kota Kinabalu District	Kota Kinabalu	Kota Kinabalu C	500421	351	1,425.7
West Coast	Papar District	Papar	Papar D	150667	1243	121.2
West Coast	Penampang District	Penampang	Penampang D	162174	425	381.6
West Coast	Putatan District	Putatan	Putatan D	68811	40	1,720.3
West Coast	Ranau District	Ranau	Ranau D	85077	3608	23.6
West Coast	Tuaran District	Tuaran	Tuaran D	135665	1166	116.4

== Sarawak ==

Division	District	Capital	Council	Population (2020)	Area (km^{2})	Density
Betong	Betong District	Betong	Betong D	36303	1547	23.5
Betong	Kabong District	Kabong	Saratok D	18404	799	23.0
Betong	Pusa District	Pusa	Betong D	19557	947	20.7
Betong	Saratok District	Saratok	Saratok D	23105	888	26.0
Bintulu
Bintulu	Bintulu District	Bintulu	Bintulu DA	178646	1991	89.7
Bintulu	Sebauh District	Sebauh	Bintulu DA	29606	5229	5.7
Bintulu	Tatau District	Tatau	Bintulu DA	31920	4946	6.5
Kapit	Belaga District	Belaga	Kapit D	22502	19050	1.2
Kapit	Kapit District	Kapit	Kapit D	36030	3973	9.1
Kapit	Song District	Song	Kapit D	9961	3935	2.5
Kapit	Bukit Mabong District	Bukit Mabong	Kapit D	10155	11976	0.8
Kuching	Bau District	Bau	Bau D	52643	884	59.6
Kuching	Kuching District	Kuching	Kuching North C Kuching South C Padawan M	609205	1498	406.7
Kuching	Lundu District	Lundu	Lundu D	33479	1812	18.5
Limbang	Lawas District	Lawas	Lawas D	36604	3812	9.6
Limbang	Limbang District	Limbang	Limbang D	45061	3978	11.3
Miri	Beluru District	Bakong	Marudi D	28695	4905	5.9
Miri	Marudi District	Marudi	Marudi D	18838	3079	6.1
Miri	Miri District	Miri	Subis D Miri C	248877	5143	48.4
Miri	Subis District	Subis	Subis D	57289	3821	15.0
Miri	Telang Usan District	Long Lama	Marudi D	17406	9829	1.8
Mukah	Dalat District	Dalat	Dalat and Mukah D	21147	905	23.4
Mukah	Daro District	Daro	Matu and Daro D	19477	1226	15.9
Mukah	Matu District	Matu	Matu and Daro D	16316	1600	10.2
Mukah	Mukah District	Mukah	Dalat and Mukah D	42275	2536	16.7
Mukah	Tanjung Manis District	Belawai	Matu and Daro D	7946	731	10.9
Samarahan	Sebuyau District (Note: new district declared December 2021)	Sebuyau	Simunjan D			
Samarahan	Gedong District	Gedong	Simunjan D			
Samarahan	Asajaya District	Asajaya	Kota Samarahan M	33606	303	110.9
Samarahan	Samarahan District	Samarahan	Kota Samarahan M	128284	407	315.2
Samarahan	Simunjan District	Simunjan	Simunjan D	36211	2218	16.3
Sarikei	Julau District	Julau	Meradong and Julau D	15333	1703	9.0
Sarikei	Meradong District	Bintangor	Meradong and Julau D	20299	719	28.2
Sarikei	Pakan District	Pakan	Meradong and Julau D	15462	925	16.7
Sarikei	Sarikei District	Sarikei	Sarikei D	44039	985	44.7
Serian	Serian District	Serian	Serian D	85345	1749	48.8
Serian	Tebedu District	Tebedu	Serian D	25232	656	38.5
Serian	Siburan District	Siburan	Serian D			
Sibu	Kanowit District	Kanowit	Kanowit D	24700	2254	11.0
Sibu	Sibu District	Sibu	Sibu M Sibu Rural D (Sibu Jaya)	248064	2230	111.2
Sibu	Selangau District	Selangau	Sibu Rural D	19844	3795	5.2
Sri Aman	Lubok Antu District	Lubok Antu	Lubok Antu D	33479	3143	10.7
Sri Aman	Sri Aman District	Simanggang	Sri Aman D	61238	2324	26.4
Sri Aman	Pantu District	Pantu	Sri Aman D	11150	833	13.4
Sri Aman	Lingga District	Lingga	Sri Aman D			

== See also ==
- Geography of Malaysia
