= Bintulu (disambiguation) =

Bintulu may refer to:

- Bintulu
- Bintulu District
- Bintulu Division
- Bintulu (federal constituency), represented in the Dewan Rakyat
