= Bintulu Hospital =

Hospital in Bintulu, Sarawak, Malaysia

Geography
- Location: Jalan Bukit Nyabau, Bintulu, Sarawak, Malaysia
- Coordinates: 3°13′46.32″N 113°6′3.7″E

Organisation
- Type: General, teaching

Services
- Emergency department: Yes
- Beds: 292 (as of 2017)

History
- Founded: 21 May 2000

Links
- Website: hbtu.moh.gov.my

Bintulu Hospital is the fourth largest hospital in the state of Sarawak, Malaysia.

== Background ==
Bintulu Hospital is developed on 21 May 2000 and has been initiated to meet the needs of the growing population and also to reduce the influx of patients in Bintulu.

== Facilities ==
Bintulu Hospital is equipped with a fully computerized system namely Hospital Information System (HIS). HIS is a comprehensive integrated information system designed to manage the administrative, financial and clinical aspects of the hospital. Bintulu Hospital is one of the three public hospitals in Malaysia selected to fully implement this system.

Bintulu Hospital offers a wide range of medical treatments, from general treatments to specialists, which include obstetrics & gynecology, orthopedics, ophthalmology, surgery and pediatric services.
