= Bintulu (federal constituency) =

Federal constituency of Sarawak, Malaysia

Bintulu (P217)
Sarawak constituency

Federal constituency
- Legislature: Dewan Rakyat
- MP: Tiong King Sing; GPS
- Constituency created: 1968
- First contested: 1969
- Last contested: 2022

Demographics
- Population (2020): 235,099
- Electors (2022): 113,599
- Area (km²): 8,300
- Pop. density (per km²): 28.3

Bintulu is a federal constituency in Bintulu Division (Bintulu District, Tatau District and Sebauh District) and Miri Division (Subis District), Sarawak, Malaysia, that has been represented in the Dewan Rakyat since 1971.

The federal constituency was created in the 1968 redistribution and is mandated to return a single member to the Dewan Rakyat under the first past the post voting system.

== Demographics ==
第15届全国大选-东方日报-2022

Ethnic breakdown of Bintulu's electorate as of 2022
1. Sarawak bumiputera (54.7%)
2. Chinese (25.4%)
3. Malay-Muslim bumiputera (19.3%)
4. Other ethnicities (0.60%)
Age breakdown of Bintulu's electorate as of 2022
1. 18-20 (7.76%)
2. 21-29 (24.6%)
3. 30-39 (21.6%)
4. 40-49 (16.2%)
5. 50-59 (14.9%)
6. 60-69 (9.79%)
7. 70-79 (3.73%)
8. 80-89 (1.01%)
9. above 90 (0.39%)
Gender breakdown of Bintulu's electorate as of 2022
1. Male (50.8%)
2. Female (49.2%)

== History ==
As of 2020, Bintulu has a population of 235,099 people.

=== Polling districts ===
According to the gazette issued on 31 October 2022, the Bintulu constituency has a total of 28 polling districts.

State constituency	Polling Districts	Code	Location
Jepak (N67)	Kuala Tatau	217/67/01	SK Kuala Annau; SK Kuala Tatau; SK Kuala Serupai; SK Sg. Setulan
Jepak (N67)	Sri Dagang	217/67/02	SMK Baru Bintulu
Jepak (N67)	Jepak	217/67/03	SK Kampung Jepak Bintulu; RH Joshua Manit Ak Buyu; SK Sg. Setiam; SK Sg. Selat
Jepak (N67)	Segan	217/67/04	RH Anthony Silas; SK Ulu Segan; Tadika KEMAS Kuala Segan
Jepak (N67)	Sungai Nyigu	217/67/05	SK Kg. Baru
Jepak (N67)	RPR Sibew	217/67/06	SK Bintulu
Tanjong Batu (N68)	Bintulu Town	217/68/01	Tadika Pimpin; Bangunan Persekutuan Perkumpulan Wanita Sarawak Daerah Bintulu (W.I); Bangunan Persatuan Bulan Sabit Merah Bintulu
Tanjong Batu (N68)	Bukit Orang	217/68/08	SK St. Anthony Bintulu
Tanjong Batu (N68)	Tanjung Batu	217/68/03	SJK (C) Chung Hua Tanjung Batu; SRA Majlis Islam Sarawak Bintu
Tanjong Batu (N68)	Li Hua	217/68/04	SMK Bintulu; SMK Bandar Bintulu; SK Asyakirin; SJK (C) Chung Hua 2
Tanjong Batu (N68)	Desa Damai	217/68/05	SJK (C) Siong Boon
Tanjong Batu (N68)	Batu Lima	217/68/06	Bilik Isolasi, SJK (C) Sebiew Chinese
Kemena (N69)	Sebauh	217/69/01	RH Lapi Sg. Binai; SK Sebauh; SJK (C) Chung San Sebauh
Kemena (N69)	Labang	217/69/02	RH Ro Teban Baru; SK Sg. Segian; Balai Raya Kampung Labang; SK Pandan
Kemena (N69)	Hulu Suai	217/69/03	SK Batu Telinggai
Kemena (N69)	Sekaloh	217/69/04	SK Sg. Manong Niah
Kemena (N69)	Sungai Sebauh	217/69/05	RH Jimbai Sg. Gerong; RH Tabor Ak Lasah Sg Sebauh; RH Raymohd Plen Sg Gelam
Kemena (N69)	Sebungan	217/69/06	RH Robert Sg. Sebungan; RH Augustine Lamau; RH Jenang Sg. Gusi Kelabat; RH Nompang Sg. Sujan
Kemena (N69)	Pandan	217/69/07	SK Kuala Sigu; RH Nicholas Sandum Sg Sigu; SK Kuala Binyo; RH Nyipa Ajong Sg. Binyo; SK Bukit Mawang; SK Sg. Genaan
Kemena (N69)	Goyang	217/69/08	SK Goyang
Kemena (N69)	Subis Satu	217/69/09	SK Sg. Lamus Niah
Samalaju (N70)	Sibiew Similaju	217/70/01	SK Kem Batu 18; Blok A & B SJK (C) Sebiew Chinese
Samalaju (N70)	Tanjung Kidurong	217/70/02	SMK Asyakirin
Samalaju (N70)	Suai	217/70/03	RH Galau Ak Sawing, Sg. Telong; SK Kpg. Tegaging; SK Kpg. Iran; SK Sg. Sebatu; SK Kuala Nyalau
Samalaju (N70)	Melor	217/70/04	SMK Kidurong
Samalaju (N70)	Mawar	217/70/05	SK Kidurong
Samalaju (N70)	RPR Kidurong	217/70/06	SK Kidurong II
Samalaju (N70)	LKTS Suai	217/70/07	SK Suai Satu Niah

=== Representation history ===
Members of Parliament for Bintulu
Parliament	No	Years	Member	Party	Vote Share
Constituency created
		1969-1971	Parliament was suspended		
3rd	P141	1971-1973	Ting Ming Kiong (丁明建)	SCA	2,919; 33.56%
3rd	P141	1973-1974	Ting Ming Kiong (丁明建)	BN (SCA)	2,919; 33.56%
4th	P151	1974-1976	Ting Ling Kiew (陈联侨)	SNAP	5,657; 52.61%
4th	P151	1976-1978	Ting Ling Kiew (陈联侨)	BN (SNAP)	5,657; 52.61%
5th	P151	1978-1982	Ting Ling Kiew (陈联侨)	BN (SNAP)	7,328; 81.20%
6th	P151	1982-1986	Ting Ling Kiew (陈联侨)	BN (SNAP)	6,379; 55.64%
7th	P174	1986-1990	Ting Ling Kiew (陈联侨)	BN (SNAP)	7,602; 47.47%
8th	P177	1990-1995	James Wong Kim Min (黄金明)	BN (SNAP)	6,337; 34.71%
9th	P189	1995-1999	Chiew Chiu Sing (周政新)	GR (DAP)	12,164; 53.54%
10th	P190	1999-2002	Tiong King Sing (张庆信)	BN (SNAP)	15,681; 52.34%
10th	P190	2002-2004	Tiong King Sing (张庆信)	BN (PDP)	15,681; 52.34%
11th	P216	2004-2008	Tiong King Sing (张庆信)	BN (PDP)	20,225; 63.67%
12th	P217	2008-2013	Tiong King Sing (张庆信)	BN (PDP)	23,628; 73.17%
13th	P217	2013-2018	Tiong King Sing (张庆信)	BN (PDP)	26,458; 58.17%
14th	P217	2018	Tiong King Sing (张庆信)	BN (PDP)	27,076; 57.05%
14th	P217	2018–2022	Tiong King Sing (张庆信)	GPS (PDP)	27,076; 57.05%
15th	P217	2022–present	Tiong King Sing (张庆信)	GPS (PDP)	43,455; 61.73%

=== State constituency ===
Parliamentary constituency	State constituency					
Parliamentary constituency	1969–1978	1978–1990	1990–1999	1999–2008	2008–2016	2016−present
Bintulu				Jepak		
Bintulu	Kemena					
Bintulu			Kidurong			
Bintulu						Samalaju
Bintulu						Tanjong Batu
Bintulu	Tatau					

=== Historical boundaries ===
State Constituency	Area					
State Constituency	1968	1977	1987	1996	2005	2015
Jepak				Anau; Jepak; Kelawit; Kuala Tatau; Sungai Selad		Jepak; Kampung Kemunting; Kampung Sungai Sebuan; Kuala Tatau; Sungai Selad
Kemena	Bintulu; Kemena; Sebauh; Similajau; Tanjong Batu		Jepak; Kemena; Kampung Sawai; Kampung Sungai Sebuan; Ulu Suai	Kampung Sawai; Kemena; Kuala Sigu; Sebauh; Ulu Suai		Kemena; Kuala Sigu; Sebauh; Sekaloh; Ulu Suai
Kidurong			Bintulu; Samalaju; Sebauh; Similajau; Tanjong Batu	Bintulu; Kuala Nyalau; Samalaju; Similajau; Tanjong Batu		
Samalaju						Kuala Nyalau; Samalaju; Similaju; Suai; Tanjung Kidurong
Tanjong Batu						Bintulu; Taman Lily; Taman Seaview; Taman Tinggi; Tanjong Batu
Tatau	Anau; Jepak; Sangan; Sungai Selad; Tatau					

=== Current state assembly members ===
No.	State Constituency	Member	Coalition (Party)
N67	Jepak	Iskandar Turkee	GPS (PBB)
N68	Tanjong Batu	Johnny Pang Leong Ming	GPS (SUPP)
N69	Kemena	Stephen Rundi Utom	GPS (PBB)
N70	Samalaju	Majang Renggi	GPS (PRS)

=== Local governments & postcodes ===
No.	State Constituency	Local Government	Postcode
N67	Jepak	Bintulu Development Authority	97000, 97300 Bintulu; 97100 Sebauh; 97200 Tatau; 98200 Niah
N68	Tanjong Batu	Bintulu Development Authority	97000, 97300 Bintulu; 97100 Sebauh; 97200 Tatau; 98200 Niah
N69	Kemena	Bintulu Development Authority; Subis District Council (Suai area)	97000, 97300 Bintulu; 97100 Sebauh; 97200 Tatau; 98200 Niah
N70	Samalaju	Bintulu Development Authority; Subis District Council (Selakoh and Subis areas)	97000, 97300 Bintulu; 97100 Sebauh; 97200 Tatau; 98200 Niah

== Election results ==
Malaysian general election, 2022
Party	Candidate	Votes	%	∆%
GPS	Tiong King Sing	43,455	61.73	▲61.73
DAP	Chiew Chan Yew	21,287	30.24	▼12.02
PN	Duke Janteng	5,650	8.03	▲8.03
Total valid votes		70,392	100.00	
Total rejected ballots		760		
Unreturned ballots		104		
Turnout		71,256	61.97	▼11.88
Registered electors		113,599		
Majority		22,168	31.49	▲16.69
GPS gain from BN		Swing		?
Source(s) https://lom.agc.gov.my/ilims/upload/portal/akta/outputp/1753265/PARLIMEN%20SARAWAK%20(PUB%20620).pdf

Malaysian general election, 2018
Party	Candidate	Votes	%	∆%
BN	Tiong King Sing	27,076	57.05	▼1.12
DAP	Chiew Chan Yew	20,054	42.26	▲0.43
STAR	Chieng Lea Phing	328	0.69	▲0.69
Total valid votes		47,458		
Total rejected ballots		523		
Unreturned ballots		55		
Turnout		48,036	73.85	▼2.90
Registered electors		65,049		
Majority		7,022	14.80	▼1.54
BN hold		Swing		
Source(s) "His Majesty's Government Gazette - Notice of Contested Election, Parliament for the State of Sarawak [P.U. (B) 247/2018]" (PDF). Attorney General's Chambers of Malaysia. 3 May 2018. "Federal Government Gazette - Results of Contested Election and Statements of the Poll after the Official Addition of Votes, Parliamentary Constituencies for the State of Sarawak [P.U. (B) 321/2018]" (PDF). Attorney General's Chambers of Malaysia. 28 May 2018. Archived from the original (PDF) on 29 December 2019.

Malaysian general election, 2013
Party	Candidate	Votes	%	∆%
BN	Tiong King Sing	26,458	58.17	▼15.00
DAP	John Brian Anthony	19,025	41.83	▲15.00
Total valid votes		45,483	100.00	
Total rejected ballots		458		
Unreturned ballots		27		
Turnout		45,968	76.75	▲12.02
Registered electors		59,893		
Majority		7,433	16.34	▼30.00
BN hold		Swing		
Source(s) "Federal Government Gazette - Notice of Contested Election, Parliament for the State of Sarawak [P.U. (B) 184/2013]" (PDF). Attorney General's Chambers of Malaysia. 26 April 2013. Archived from the original (PDF) on 30 September 2018. "Federal Government Gazette - Results of Contested Election and Statements of the Poll after the Official Addition of Votes, Parliamentary Constituencies for the State of Sarawak [P.U. (B) 225/2013]" (PDF). Attorney General's Chambers of Malaysia. 22 May 2013. Archived from the original (PDF) on 30 September 2018.

Malaysian general election, 2008
Party	Candidate	Votes	%	∆%
BN	Tiong King Sing	23,628	73.17	▲9.50
DAP	Lim Su Kien	8,663	26.83	▼1.37
Total valid votes		32,291	100.00	
Total rejected ballots		288		
Unreturned ballots		50		
Turnout		32,629	64.73	▼0.22
Registered electors		50,404		
Majority		14,965	46.34	▲10.87
BN hold		Swing		

Malaysian general election, 2004
Party	Candidate	Votes	%	∆%
BN	Tiong King Sing	20,225	63.67	▲11.33
DAP	Chiew Chiu Sing	8,958	28.20	▼19.46
SNAP	Lau Hieng Kii	2,583	8.13	▲8.13
Total valid votes		31,766	100.00	
Total rejected ballots		288		
Unreturned ballots		13		
Turnout		32,067	64.95	▼1.33
Registered electors		49,374		
Majority		11,267	35.47	▲30.79
BN hold		Swing		

Malaysian general election, 1999
Party	Candidate	Votes	%	∆%
BN	Tiong King Sing	15,681	52.34	▲6.70
DAP	Chiew Chiu Sing	14,281	47.66	▼5.88
Total valid votes		29,962	100.00	
Total rejected ballots		422		
Unreturned ballots		53		
Turnout		30,437	66.28	▲2.56
Registered electors		45,920		
Majority		1,400	4.68	▼3.22
BN gain from DAP		Swing		?

Malaysian general election, 1995
Party	Candidate	Votes	%	∆%
DAP	Chiew Chiu Sing	12,164	53.54	▲20.40
BN	James Wong Kim Min	10,370	45.64	▲10.93
Independent	Johnny Walker Tinggang	185	0.81	▲0.81
Total valid votes		22,719	100.00	
Total rejected ballots		389		
Unreturned ballots		49		
Turnout		23,157	63.72	▲1.22
Registered electors		36,240		
Majority		1,794	7.90	▲6.33
DAP gain from BN		Swing		?

Malaysian general election, 1990
Party	Candidate	Votes	%	∆%
BN	James Wong Kim Min	6,337	34.71	▼12.76
DAP	Chiew Chiu Sing	6,050	33.14	▲14.51
PERMAS	Salleh Jafaruddin	3,227	17.68	▲17.68
Independent	Francis Lutau Jilan	2,118	11.60	▲11.60
Independent	Daniel Sigah Limbai	523	2.86	▲2.86
Total valid votes		18,255	100.00	
Total rejected ballots		292		
Unreturned ballots		0		
Turnout		18,547	62.50	▲1.63
Registered electors		29,673		
Majority		287	1.57	▼12.00
BN hold		Swing		

Malaysian general election, 1986
Party	Candidate	Votes	%	∆%
BN	Ting Ling Kiew	7,602	47.47	▼8.17
Independent	Victor Temenggong Angang	5,429	33.90	▲33.90
DAP	Goh Ngiap Joon	2,984	18.63	▲18.63
Total valid votes		16,015	100.00	
Total rejected ballots		383		
Unreturned ballots		0		
Turnout		16,398	60.87	▲0.67
Registered electors		26,938		
Majority		2,173	13.57	▼17.18
BN hold		Swing		

Malaysian general election, 1982
Party	Candidate	Votes	%	∆%
BN	Ting Ling Kiew	6,379	55.64	▼25.56
Independent	Stephen Randi Sekalai	2,853	24.89	▲24.89
Independent	Hu Liong Kwong	1,145	9.99	▲9.99
Independent	Julaihi Hanafi	1,087	9.48	▲9.48
Total valid votes		11,464	100.00	
Total rejected ballots		491		
Unreturned ballots		0		
Turnout		11,955	60.20	▲0.21
Registered electors		19,859		
Majority		3,526	30.75	▼31.65
BN hold		Swing		

Malaysian general election, 1978
Party	Candidate	Votes	%	∆%
BN	Ting Ling Kiew	7,328	81.20	▲81.20
Parti Anak Jati Sarawak	Frederick Kiai	1,697	18.80	▲18.80
Total valid votes		9,025	100.00	
Total rejected ballots		467		
Unreturned ballots		0		
Turnout		10,451	59.99	▼13.19
Registered electors		17,420		
Majority		5,631	62.40	▲57.18
BN gain from SNAP		Swing		?

Malaysian general election, 1974
Party	Candidate	Votes	%	∆%
SNAP	Ting Ling Kiew	5,657	52.61	▲29.18
BN	Ting Ming Kiong	5,096	47.39	▲47.39
Total valid votes		10,753	100.00	
Total rejected ballots		689		
Unreturned ballots		0		
Turnout		11,442	73.18	▲1.06
Registered electors		15,636		
Majority		561	5.22	▼3.24
SNAP gain from SCA		Swing		?

Malaysian general election, 1969
Party	Candidate	Votes	%
SCA	Ting Ming Kiong	2,919	33.56
PESAKA	Jilan Nyeggang	2,183	25.10
SNAP	Ismail Sebli	2,038	23.43
SUPP	Tedong Taboh	1,461	16.80
Independent	Jubin Magah	96	1.10
Total valid votes		8,697	100.00
Total rejected ballots		728	
Unreturned ballots		0	
Turnout		9,425	72.12
Registered electors		13,069	
Majority		736	8.46
This was a new constituency created.
