= Bukit Mabong District =

Bukit Mabong
- District
- Country: Malaysia
- State: Sarawak
- Division: Kapit

Bukit Mabong is a district, in Kapit Division, Sarawak, Malaysia.

== History ==
Bukit Mabong district is one of 9 newly created districts in Sarawak and was officially declared as a district on 3 November 2015 which was officiated by the Most Honourable Chief Minister of Sarawak Adenan Bin Satem.

== Administration ==
Bukit Mabong District is administered by the Bukit Mabong District Office. The administrative boundary of Bukit Mabong district starts from the Batu Bansu area up to the upstream area, including 3 villages that were previously under the administration of the Belaga District, namely Long Busang, Long Unai and Sang Anau. Bukit Mabong district has an area of about 11,976 square kilometers and is inhabited by about 22,145 people.

== Demographics ==
There's about 22,145 people live in the Bukit Mabong district. In Long Busang, there are about 1000 people living in the village. They consist of the Kenyah Badeng tribe. 70 percent of the residents in Long Busang are Christians while the rest are Muslims.

== Geography ==
Bukit Mabong is located in the Tunoh area, in the northern part of Baleh. It is also located in the Hose Mountains. Among the cultural landscape features found here are Bukit Batu which is the highest point in the district at 2,028 meters, Gunung Gelanggang, Bukit Batu Tiban which is located in the Malaysia-Indonesia border, Sungai Balleh and Sungai Balui. Bukit Mabong borders the districts of Kapit, Belaga and Song as well as the provinces of East Kalimantan and West Kalimantan in Indonesia.
