= Kanowit District =

Coordinates: 2°00′N 112°10′E

Kanowit
- District
- Seal

- Country: Malaysia
- State: Sarawak
- Division: Sibu
- Seat: Kanowit

Kanowit is a district, in Sibu Division, Sarawak, Malaysia. The seat of this district is the town of Kanowit.
