= Bintulu Division =

Coordinates: 2°55′59.2″N 113°15′29.3″E

Bintulu
- Division of Sarawak
- Flag

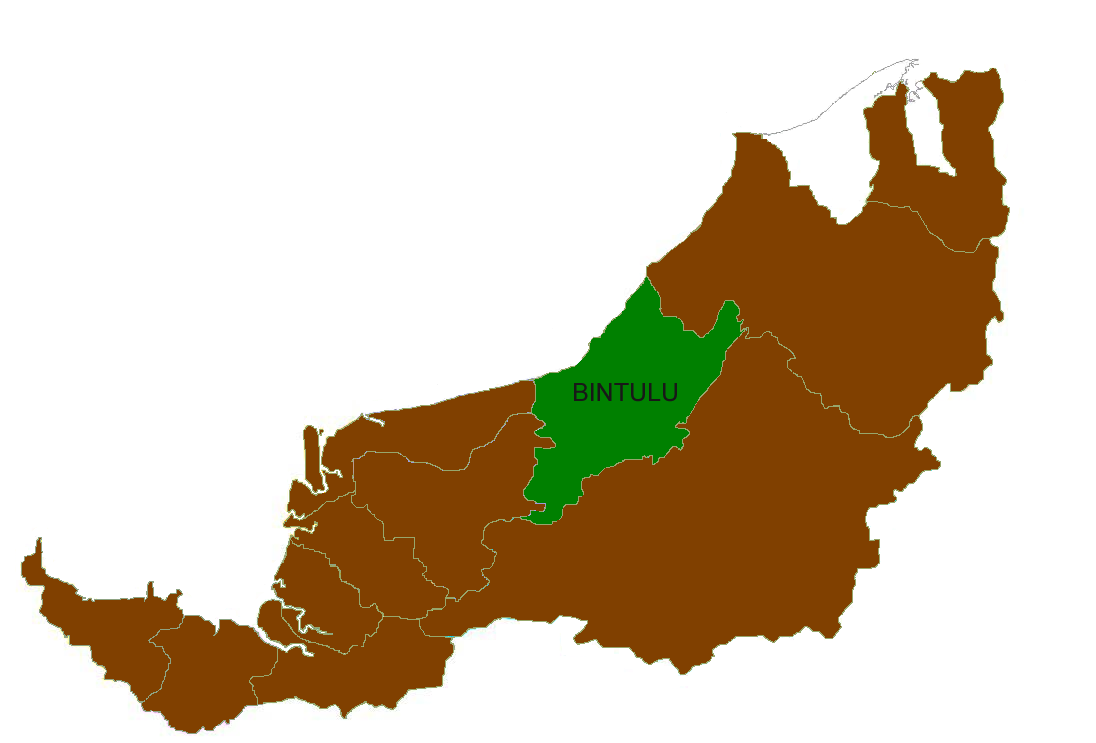
- Country: Malaysia
- Division Office location: Bintulu
- Local area government (s): Bintulu Development Authority (BDA)

Government
  - Resident: Jack Aman Luat

Area
  - Total: 12,166.2 km^{2} (4,697.4 sq mi)

Population (2024)
  - Total: 253,579
  - Density: 20.8429/km^{2} (53.9829/sq mi)

Ethnicity
  - Iban: 41.6%
  - Chinese: 16.2%
  - Melanau: 10.7%
  - Others: 31.5%
- License plate prefix: QD, QT

Bintulu Division is one of the twelve administrative divisions of Sarawak, Malaysia. It has a total area of 12,166.2 km^{2} (4,697.4 mi^{2}), and is the third largest division after Kapit Division and Miri Division. Bintulu Division consists of two districts which is Bintulu and Tatau, together with a sub-district under Bintulu, which is Sebauh. Three major towns in Bintulu are Bintulu (which is the capital of both Bintulu District and Bintulu Division), Tatau and Sebauh.

== Demography ==
The population of Bintulu Division (year 2023 census) was 253,579. This makes Bintulu one of the most loosely populated divisions in Sarawak with only 14 people per kilometre. Despite being the most loosely populated, Bintulu Division has the fourth biggest town in Sarawak, which is Bintulu town. Most of the Bintulu Division's population is concentrated in this town.

=== Ethnic makeup ===
Bintulu is traditionally a home to Iban, Chinese, Melanau, Malay, Orang Ulu and Kedayan people. Most Ibans are scattered throughout rural areas of Bintulu, namely in Tatau and Sebauh. Whilst, Melanau people (or Melanau Bintulu/Vaie people) are concentrated at the town areas in Bintulu and rural communal areas, namely at Bintulu town, Tatau town, Kuala Tatau, Sebauh, Pandan and Labang. Many Malay people are not originally from Bintulu, however, intermarriage with locals especially Melanau people has made Malay as one of the major ethnics in Bintulu. Chinese people are more concentrated at town areas, such as at Bintulu, Sebauh and Tatau town, while some resides at Sangan and Kuala Tatau. Orang Ulu people, such as Kenyah, Kayan, Tatau, Penan and Punan are more scattered throughout Bintulu division compared to Iban people. Most of them still live deep in the rural areas like Kakus and Jelalong. Kedayan people, although small in number, can be spotted at Nyalau areas (100 km from Bintulu) just at the border with Miri Division.

There is a large influx of foreign worker population due to the strength of the petroleum industry. It was estimated more than 20% of Bintulu population are foreign workers and expatriates.

Population of Bintulu by Ethnics
Administrative District	Total Population	Malay	Iban	Bidayuh	Melanau	Other Bumiputera	Chinese	Other Non-Bumiputera	Non-Citizen
Bintulu	186,100 (84.5%)	17,500 (9.4%)	71,300 (38.3%)	2,500 (1.4%)	21,200 (11.4%)	8,700 (4.7%)	33,300 (17.9%)	900 (0.4%)	30,700 (16.5%)
Tatau	28,900 (15.5%)	1,200 (4.2%)	18,200 (63.0%)	200 (0.7%)	1,700 (5.9%)	2,800 (9.7%)	1,500 (5.2%)	100 (0.3%)	3,300 (11.4%)
Total Bintulu Division	215,000 (100%)	18,700 (8.7%)	89,500 (41.6%)	2,700 (1.3%)	22,900 (10.7%)	11,500 (5.3%)	34,800 (16.2%)	1000 (0.5%)	34,000 (15.8%)

== Administration ==
Administrative districts of Bintulu Division.

=== Members of Parliament ===
Parliament	Member of Parliament	Party
P214 Selangau	YB Edwin Banta	GPS (PRS)
P216 Hulu Rajang	YB Datuk Wilson Ugak Kumbong	GPS (PRS)
P217 Bintulu	YB Datuk Tiong King Sing	GPS (PDP)

== Economy ==
The economy is largely based on the petroleum and natural gas industries. Bintulu has an estimated 85% of Sarawak’s known natural gas reserves, or some 42.3 trillion cubic feet (1,200 km^{3}). In addition to export as liquified natural gas, on-shore facilities produce fertiliser, and formaldehyde resins. Bintulu also has about half of Sarawak's crude oil reserves of 500 million barrels (79,000,000 m^{3}), with production wells located some 40 kilometers offshore.

Bintulu has around 27% of Sarawak’s tropical rainforest, and the timber industry remains a strong component of the Division's economy. Bintulu Division has a total designated area of 1,071,031 hectares for logging purposes. The Division is the main producer of wood species from peat swamp forests such as Ramin, Alan, and Jongkong. Bintulu Division produces an average of 4.7 million m^{3} of logs per year. Agriculture is relatively minor although growing steadily, with oil palm, rattan and pepper the main products. Deposits of coal have been discovered, but are yet unexploited.

== Transportation ==
Although Bintulu is well connected to other parts of Sarawak with good networks of road, river transports still play the vital role in Bintulu. People of Bintulu Division can opt for rural shuttle bus service to Tatau, Sebauh, Nyalau, even as far as Sungai Asap in Kapit Division. The only shuttle bus operating for both town and rural services is Jepak Holding.

As for people who wish to travel to upriver areas which are inaccessible by road such as Jelalong, Ng. Tau, Pandan, Labang, Kuala Serupai, Kuala Baggiau, Sungai Anap and Bukit Balai, they have to use available ferry and boat services. River transport charges remain high in Bintulu Division due to the long distance of the upriver areas.

There are some rural areas which are accessible by timber tracks and palm estate roads such as Labang, Tubau and Kakus. Availability of transports to these areas are limited through bookings at Bintulu town, using private vans or four-wheel drive vehicles.

== Infrastructure ==
Bintulu Division has good networks of road. Pan-Borneo Highway is a trunk road linking Bintulu to the rest of divisions in Sarawak. Bintulu Division is expected to expand rapidly due to Similajau being part of Sarawak Corridor of Renewable Energy regional development and ongoing gas pipeline project from Sabah to Tanjung Kidurong.

=== Education ===
Bintulu Division has a moderate number of public schools. Most secondary schools are located at Bintulu district. There is only one secondary school for Tatau District. As for primary schools, most of them are scattered throughout Bintulu. Some of them are located deep in the Bintulu Division's interior to cater for rural students. There is one secondary school run privately which is SM Kai Dee, a Chinese education-based school.

Bintulu Division is home to a public university branch which is Universiti Putra Malaysia Sarawak (UPMS) and various government education institutions such as GIATMARA, IKM and ADTEC. There is also a private education institution which is Kolej Sendaya. Bintulu is a place surrounding by the oil and gas industry. The major economy of this city is related to the energy company. The institution offering the oil and gas industry is Institut Kemahiran MARA Bintulu. IKM Bintulu is a government institution that caters for human capital development in the oil and gas industry. The institution can customise according to the industry skill set requirement.

=== Healthcare ===
Bintulu Division has one government hospital which is Bintulu Hospital and one government polyclinic at Bintulu town. There are also private-owned hospitals such as Columbia-Asia Hospital at Tanjung Kidurong and Bintulu Medical Centre at Bintulu town. As for Tatau and Sebauh sub-district, both have their own health clinics. Smaller government health clinics do exist at Ng. Tau and Tubau.

=== Security ===
Bintulu Division has two police district offices, namely at Bintulu and Tatau. There are also police stations and police bits located at strategic locations, as well as rural areas. Despite being the third largest division, Bintulu Division so far has no district military bases. Only small military camps do exist just to make presence.

=== Government services ===
Other government offices have set up their branches in both Bintulu and Tatau district (some at Sebauh sub-district and other smaller communal areas) such as Royal Customs, Fire and Rescue Department, Education Department, etc.

== See also ==
- Sarawak
- Bintulu District
- Sebauh Sub-district
- Tatau District
- Institut Kemahiran MARA Bintulu (IKM Bintulu)
- ADTEC Bintulu
- UPM Bintulu
