= Mukah District =

Mukah
- District
- Interactive map of Mukah
- Coordinates: 2°48′30″N 112°24′10″E
- Country: Malaysia
- State: Sarawak

Map of Mukah District

Mukah is a district, in Mukah Division, Sarawak, Malaysia.
