= Sebauh District =

Sebauh
- District
- Flag

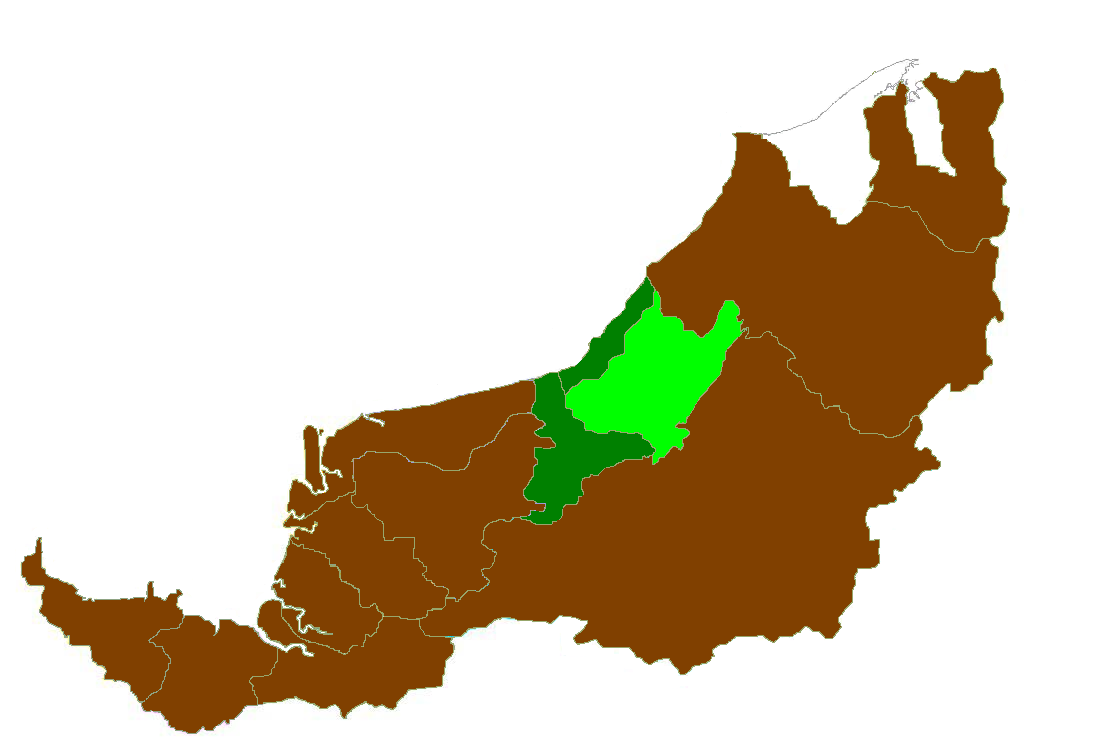
- District Office location: Sebauh
- Local area government(s): Lembaga Kemajuan Bintulu (BDA)

Government
  - District Officer: William Manggoi @ Mohd Irwan

Area
  - Total: 5,262.9 km^{2} (2,032.0 sq mi)

Population (2000)
  - Total: 21,754
  - Density: 4.1335/km^{2} (10.706/sq mi)
- Vehicle registration: QT

Map of Sebauh District

Sebauh is a district of Bintulu Division, Sarawak, Malaysia. It shares a boundary with Miri, Baram, Kapit Division, Belaga and Tatau. It has a total area of roughly 5,263 km^{2} (2,032 sq mi). Sebauh town is a main administrative and economy centre of Sebauh district.

== Demography ==
The population of Sebauh district was 21,754 in 2000. Sebauh was upgraded to become a full district of Bintulu Division on 1 August 2015.

=== Ethnics ===
Sebauh District is home to Iban, Chinese, Melanau, Malay and Ulu people. Most Ibans are scattered throughout rural areas of Sebauh, namely in Pandan, Labang, Tubau and Kakus. Melanau people (or Melanau Bintulu/Vaie people) are concentrated at Sebauh town and rural communal areas, namely Pandan and Labang. Many Malay people are not originally from Sebauh, however, intermarriage with locals especially Melanau people has made Malay one of the major ethnic groups in Sebauh. Chinese people are more concentrated at Sebauh town, while some reside in the rural areas of Kuala Kebulu and Jelalong. Orang Ulu people, such as Kenyah, Kayan, Tatau, Penan and Punan are more scattered throughout Sebauh District compared to Iban people. Most of them still live in rural areas like Kakus and Jelalong.

There is an influx of foreign worker population due to logging and the timber products industry. Most of these foreign workers are from Indonesia.

== Economy ==
Agriculture is a major part of the economy in Sebauh with oil palm, rattan and pepper being the main products. Around 70% of Sebauh people are involved in agriculture, and 25% in the timber industry. Deposits of coal have been discovered, but are unexploited.

== Transportation ==
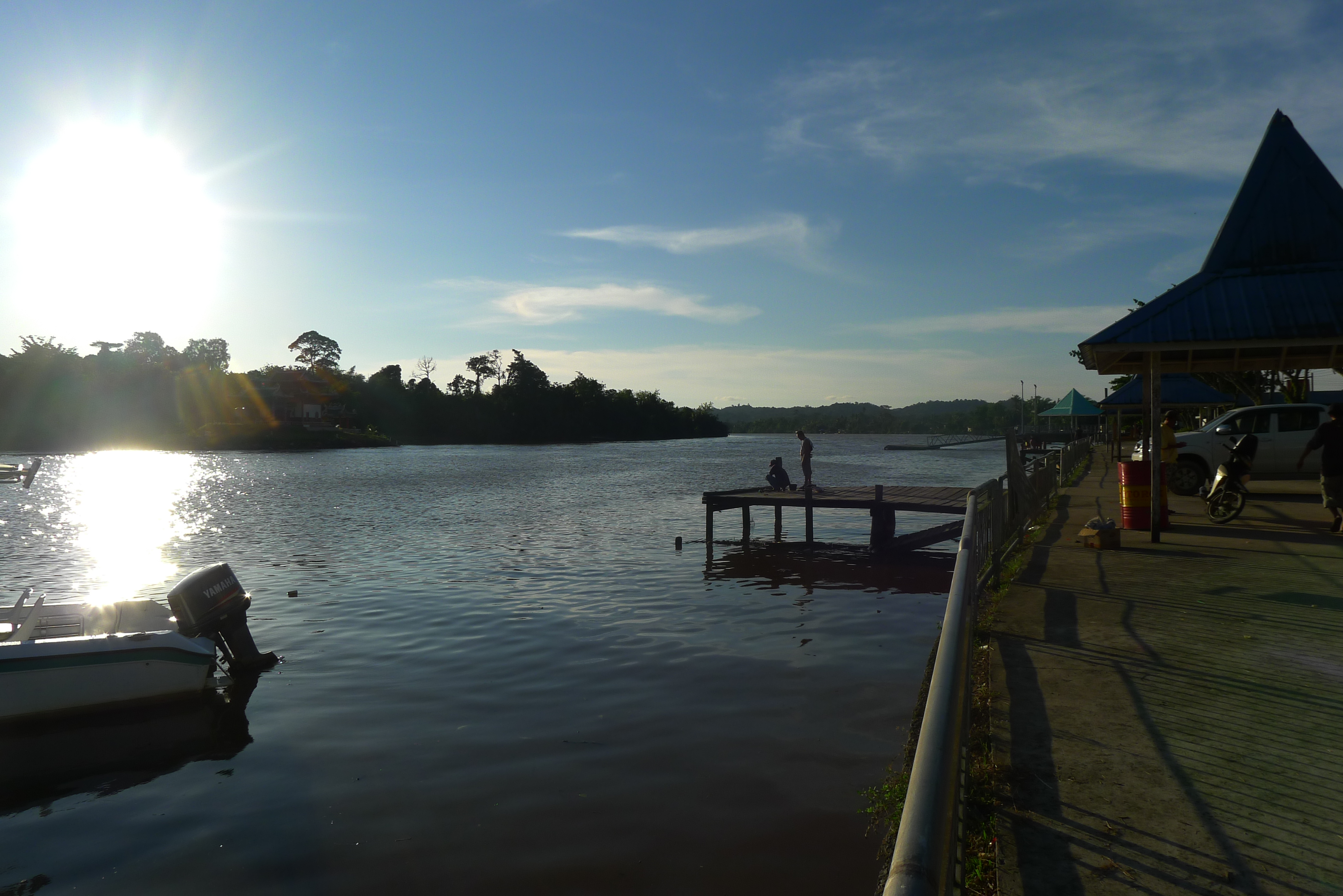
A quiet morning at the jetties in Sebauh town.

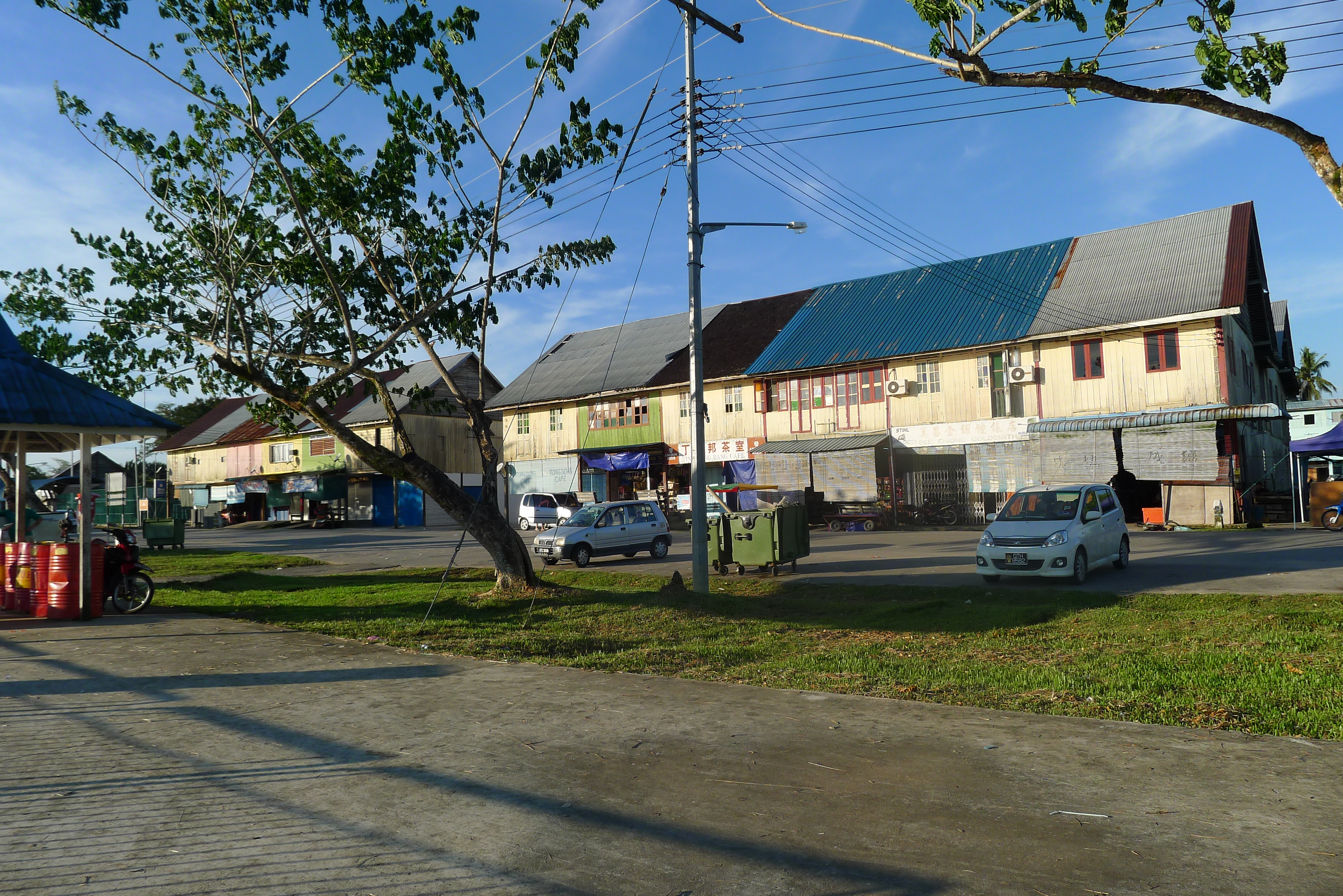
A row of wooden shoplots facing the river in Sebauh town.

The Pan-Borneo Highway did cut through Sebauh District. However, the road to Sebauh town branches out from this highway at around 30 km (19 mi) from Bintulu town, with another 25 km (16 mi) going inside from the junction. There is a shuttle bus operating for Sebauh-Bintulu route by Jepak Holding. Private vans and four-wheel drive vehicles go to parts of Sebauh district which are accessible by road.

Ferry and boat services are used to travel to upriver areas such as Jelalong, Pandan, Labang, Kuala Kebulu and Bukit Balai, as they are inaccessible by road. River transport charges remain high in Sebauh District due to the long distance involved.

There are some rural areas which are accessible by timber tracks and palm estate roads such as Labang, Tubau and Kakus. Availability of transports to these areas are limited through bookings at Bintulu town, using private vans or four-wheel drive vehicles.

== Infrastructure ==
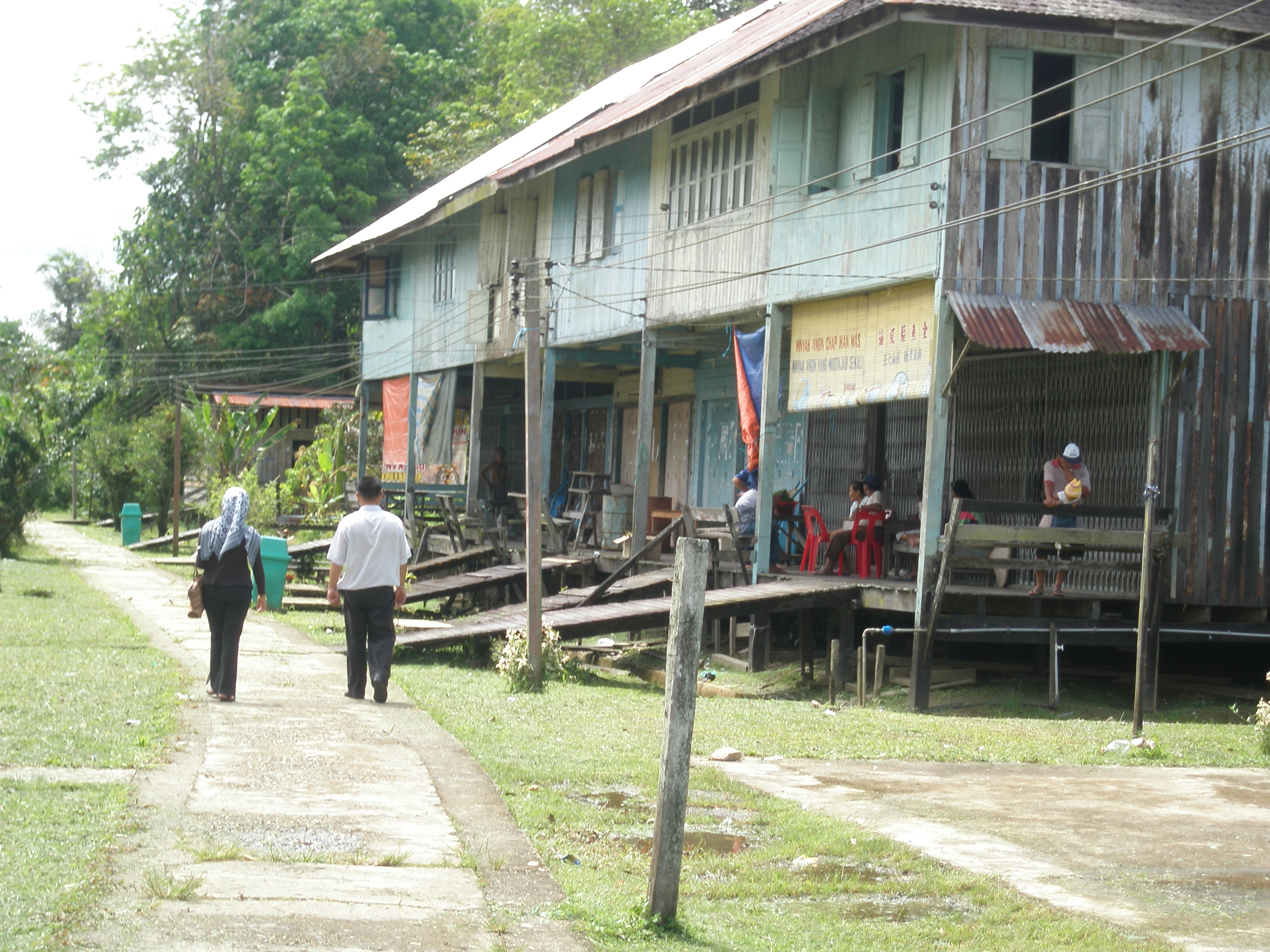
Labang town, Sebauh District

Sebauh District is moderately served with electrical and water supplies. Pan-Borneo Highway is a trunk road linking Sebauh district to the rest of Sarawak. Telecommunication and internet services are limited in Sebauh, with cable lines as the only source of broadband access.

=== Education ===
There is one secondary school for Sebauh District. There are 11 primary schools, scattered throughout Sebauh district. Some of them are located in the district's interior to cater for rural students.

=== Healthcare ===
Sebauh District has three healthcare clinics – at Sebauh town, Labang and Tubau. These healthcare clinics are operated solely for cases which can be handled by medical officers, not necessarily needing a general practitioner. Ambulance services are available to transport patients with critical illnesses to Bintulu Hospital.

=== Security ===
Sebauh District has police stations and police bits located at communal areas and Sebauh town. Like the rest of Bintulu Division, there are no military camps for Sebauh District.

=== Government services ===
Government offices have set up their branches in Sebauh such as Education and Agriculture.

== See also ==
- Bintulu District
- Tatau District
