= Telang Usan District =

Telang Usan
- District
- Country: Malaysia
- State: Sarawak

Map of Telang Usan District

Telang Usan is a newly established district, in Miri Division, Sarawak, Malaysia. This district was part of Long Lama sub-district which was formerly part of Marudi administrative district.
