= Subis District =

Subis
- District
- Seal

- Location within Borneo
- Coordinates: 4°3′24″N 113°50′42″E
- Country: Malaysia
- State: Sarawak

Population (2008)
  - Total: 54,600

Map of Subis District

Subis is a district of Malaysia in Miri Division, Sarawak.

== Federal Parliament and State Assembly seats ==
List of Subis district representatives in the Federal Parliament (Dewan Rakyat)

No.	Federal Constituency	Member	Coalition (Party)
P217	Bintulu	Tiong King Sing	Gabungan Parti Sarawak (PDP)
P218	Sibuti	Lukanisman Awang Sauni	Gabungan Parti Sarawak (PBB)

List of Subis district representatives in the State Legislative Assembly of Sarawak

No.	State Constituency	Member	Coalition (Party)
N69	Kemena	Stephen Rundi Utom	Gabungan Parti Sarawak (PBB)
N70	Samalaju	Majang Renggi	Gabungan Parti Sarawak (PRS)
N71	Bekenu	Rosey Yunus	Gabungan Parti Sarawak (PBB)
N72	Lambir	Ripin Lamat	Gabungan Parti Sarawak (PBB)
