= Bintulu District =

District in Sarawak, Malaysia

Coordinates: 3.199°N 113.102°E

- District
- Flag

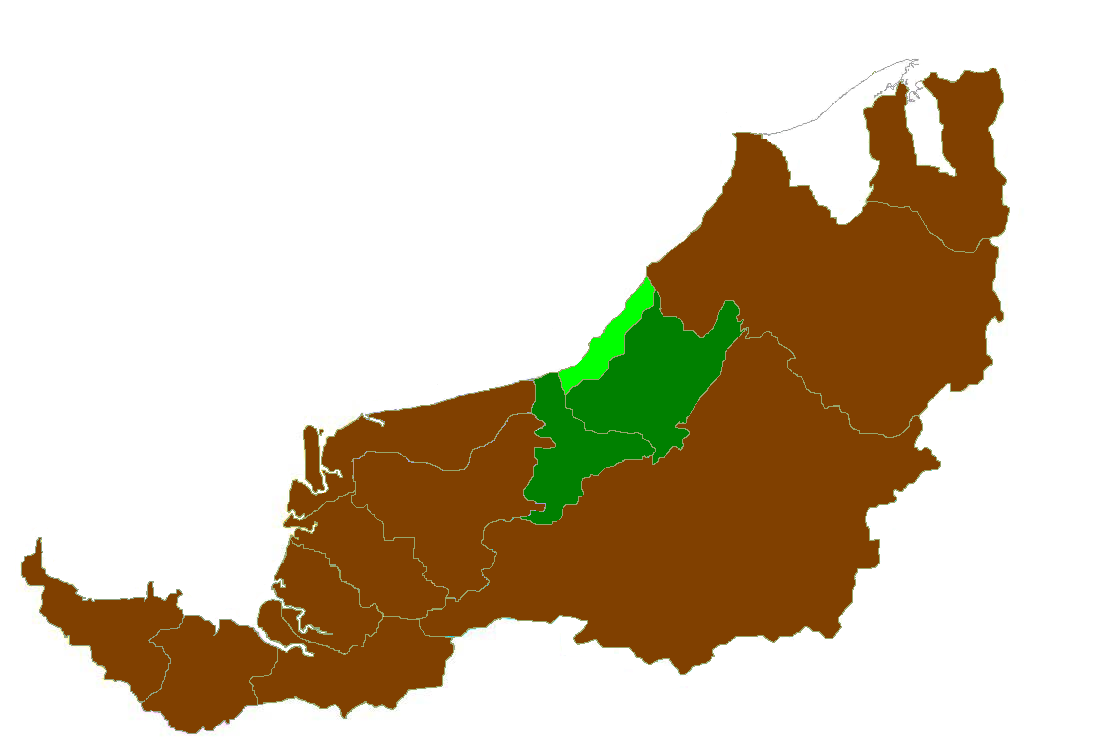
- Country: Malaysia
- State: Sarawak
- Division: Bintulu Division
- District Office location: Bintulu
- Local area government (s): Bintulu Development Authority (BDA)

Government
  - Resident Officer: Haji Ismail Bin Haji Mohd. Hanis
  - District Officer: Tuah anak Suni

Area
  - Total: 1,990.40 km^{2} (768.50 sq mi)

Population (2008, estimate)
  - Total: 186,100
  - Density: 93.50/km^{2} (242.2/sq mi)

Ethnicity
  - Iban: 38.3%
  - Chinese: 17.9%
  - Melanau: 11.4%
  - Others: 32.4%

Map of Bintulu District

The Bintulu District is one of two districts of Bintulu Division in Sarawak, Malaysia. It has a total area of 7,220.40 km^{2} (2,787.81 sq mi). Bintulu District has a sub-district, Sebauh. There are two towns in Bintulu District, namely Bintulu, which is the capital of both Bintulu District and Bintulu Division, and Sebauh.

== Demography ==
The population of Bintulu District was estimated at 186,100 in 2008. Most of the Bintulu district's population is concentrated at Bintulu proper.

=== Ethnics ===
Bintulu is traditionally a home to Iban, Chinese, Melanau, Malay, Orang Ulu and Kedayan people. Most Ibans are scattered throughout rural areas of Bintulu, namely in Tatau and Sebauh. Melanau people (or Melanau Bintulu/Vaie people) are concentrated at the town areas in Bintulu and rural communal areas, namely at Bintulu town, Sebauh, Pandan and Labang. Many Malay people are not originally from Bintulu, however, intermarriage with locals, especially Melanau people, has made Malay as one of the major ethnic groups in Bintulu. Chinese people are more concentrated at town areas, such as at Bintulu, Sebauh and Tanjung Kidurong, while some resides at Kuala Kebulu and Jelalong. Orang Ulu people, such as Kenyah, Kayan, Tatau, Penan and Punan are more scattered throughout Bintulu district compared to Iban people. Most of them still live deep in rural areas like Kakus and Jelalong. Kedayan people, although small in number, live in Nyalau areas (100 km (62 mi) from Bintulu) just at the border with Miri Division.

There has been a large influx of foreign worker population due to the strength of the petroleum industry. It was estimated more than 20% of Bintulu population are foreign workers and expatriates.

Population of Bintulu by Ethnics
Administrative District	Total Population	Malay	Iban	Bidayuh	Melanau	Other Bumiputera	Chinese	Other Non-Bumiputera	Non-Citizen
Bintulu	186,100 (84.5%)	17,500 (9.4%)	71,300 (38.3%)	2,500 (1.4%)	21,200 (11.4%)	8,700 (4.7%)	33,300 (17.9%)	900 (0.4%)	30,700 (16.5%)

== Economy ==
The economy is largely based on the petroleum and natural gas industries. Bintulu has an estimated 85% of Sarawak's known natural gas reserves, or some 42.3 trillion cubic feet (1,200 km^{3}). In addition to export as liquified natural gas, on-shore facilities produce fertiliser, and formaldehyde resins. Bintulu also has about half of Sarawak's crude oil reserves of 500 million barrels (79,000,000 m^{3}), with production wells located some 40 km (25 mi) offshore.

Bintulu has around 27% of Sarawak's tropical rainforest, and the timber industry remains a strong component of the division's economy. Agriculture is relatively minor although growing steadily, with oil palm, rattan and pepper the main products. Deposits of coal have been discovered, but are unexploited.

== Climate ==
Climate data for Bintulu (1991–2020 normals, extremes 1915–present)
Month	Jan	Feb	Mar	Apr	May	Jun	Jul	Aug	Sep	Oct	Nov	Dec	Year
Record high °C (°F)	34.1 (93.4)	33.7 (92.7)	35.3 (95.5)	36.0 (96.8)	35.9 (96.6)	36.0 (96.8)	35.8 (96.4)	36.3 (97.3)	36.0 (96.8)	34.6 (94.3)	34.0 (93.2)	34.7 (94.5)	36.3 (97.3)
Mean daily maximum °C (°F)	30.4 (86.7)	30.4 (86.7)	31.3 (88.3)	31.9 (89.4)	32.2 (90.0)	32.1 (89.8)	32.1 (89.8)	32.1 (89.8)	31.7 (89.1)	31.3 (88.3)	31.1 (88.0)	30.9 (87.6)	31.5 (88.7)
Daily mean °C (°F)	26.3 (79.3)	26.4 (79.5)	26.9 (80.4)	27.3 (81.1)	27.5 (81.5)	27.3 (81.1)	27.2 (81.0)	27.1 (80.8)	26.9 (80.4)	26.7 (80.1)	26.7 (80.1)	26.5 (79.7)	26.9 (80.4)
Mean daily minimum °C (°F)	23.6 (74.5)	23.6 (74.5)	23.8 (74.8)	24.0 (75.2)	24.2 (75.6)	23.9 (75.0)	23.7 (74.7)	23.7 (74.7)	23.6 (74.5)	23.5 (74.3)	23.6 (74.5)	23.6 (74.5)	23.8 (74.8)
Record low °C (°F)	18.9 (66.0)	19.9 (67.8)	19.4 (66.9)	21.1 (70.0)	21.1 (70.0)	20.0 (68.0)	20.6 (69.1)	20.6 (69.1)	20.6 (69.1)	21.1 (70.0)	19.4 (66.9)	20.0 (68.0)	18.9 (66.0)
Average precipitation mm (inches)	460.0 (18.11)	299.5 (11.79)	278.5 (10.96)	272.7 (10.74)	232.8 (9.17)	245.4 (9.66)	247.6 (9.75)	298.0 (11.73)	302.8 (11.92)	372.1 (14.65)	425.0 (16.73)	453.6 (17.86)	3,888 (153.07)
Average precipitation days (≥ 1.0 mm)	18.0	14.0	12.9	15.1	13.3	13.6	13.3	13.3	15.3	18.3	20.2	20.4	187.7
Average relative humidity (%)	87	87	85	85	85	85	84	85	85	86	85	87	85
Mean monthly sunshine hours	142.1	151.0	178.1	192.9	204.3	201.3	203.5	186.7	171.2	171.2	164.8	163.6	2,130.7
Source 1: World Meteorological Organization
Source 2: Deutscher Wetterdienst (humidity, 1930–1969), Meteo Climat (record highs and lows)

== Transportation ==
Although Bintulu is well connected to other parts of Sarawak with good networks of road, river transports still play the vital role in Bintulu. Rural shuttle bus services offer transport to Tatau, Sebauh, Nyalau, and as far as Sungai Asap in Kapit Division. The only shuttle bus operating for both town and rural services is Jepak Holding.

Ferry and boat services are available for transport to Jelalong, Ng. Tau, Pandan, Labang, Kuala Serupai, Kuala Baggiau, Sungai Anap and Bukit Balai as they are inaccessible by road. River transport charges remain high in Bintulu Division due to the long distance of the upriver areas.

There are some rural areas which are accessible by timber tracks and palm estate roads such as Labang, Tubau and Kakus. Availability of transports to these areas are limited through bookings at Bintulu town, using private vans or four-wheel drive vehicles.

== Infrastructure ==
The Pan-Borneo Highway is a trunk road linking Bintulu to the rest of Sarawak. Bintulu District is expected to expand rapidly due to Similajau being part of Sarawak Corridor of Renewal Energy regional development and ongoing gas pipeline project from Sabah to Tanjung Kidurong.

=== Education ===
Bintulu District has a moderate number of public schools. Most secondary schools in Bintulu Division are located at Bintulu district. Most primary schools are scattered throughout Bintulu. Some of them are located deep in the Bintulu District's interior to cater for rural students. There is one secondary school run privately which is SM Kai Dee, a Chinese education-based school.

Bintulu District is home to a branch of Universiti Putra Malaysia and various government education institutions such as GIATMARA, IKM and ADTEC. There is also a private education institution which is Kolej Sedamai.

=== Healthcare ===
The only government hospital in Bintulu District is Bintulu Hospital and has a government policlinic at Bintulu town. There are also private-owned hospital such as Columbia-Asia Hospital at Tanjung Kidurong and Bintulu Medical Centre at Bintulu town. Both Tatau and Sebauh sub-district, have their own health clinic. Smaller government health clinics exist at Labang and Tubau.

=== Security ===
Bintulu District has a police district office. There are also police stations and police bits located at strategic locations, as well as rural areas. Like other district in the division, Bintulu has no district military bases. However, small military camps are present.

=== Government services ===
Many government offices have set up their branches in Bintulu district (some at Sebauh sub-district and other smaller communal areas) such as Royal Customs, Fire and Rescue Department and Education Department.

== See also ==
- Tatau District
- Sebauh District
