= Pakan =

Pakan may refer to:

== Places ==
=== Canada ===
- Pakan, Alberta, a town
- Pakan (electoral district), defunct

=== Malaysia ===
- Pakan, Sarawak, a town in Sarawak
- Pakan District, in Sarawak
- Pakan (state constituency)

=== Taiwan ===
- Beigang River, formerly known as the Pakan
- Pakan, an historical name for the island of Taiwan; see History of Taiwan

== Other uses ==
- Pakan language
