= Sultan Iskandar Planetarium =

Sultan Iskandar Planetarium Planetarium Sultan Iskandar

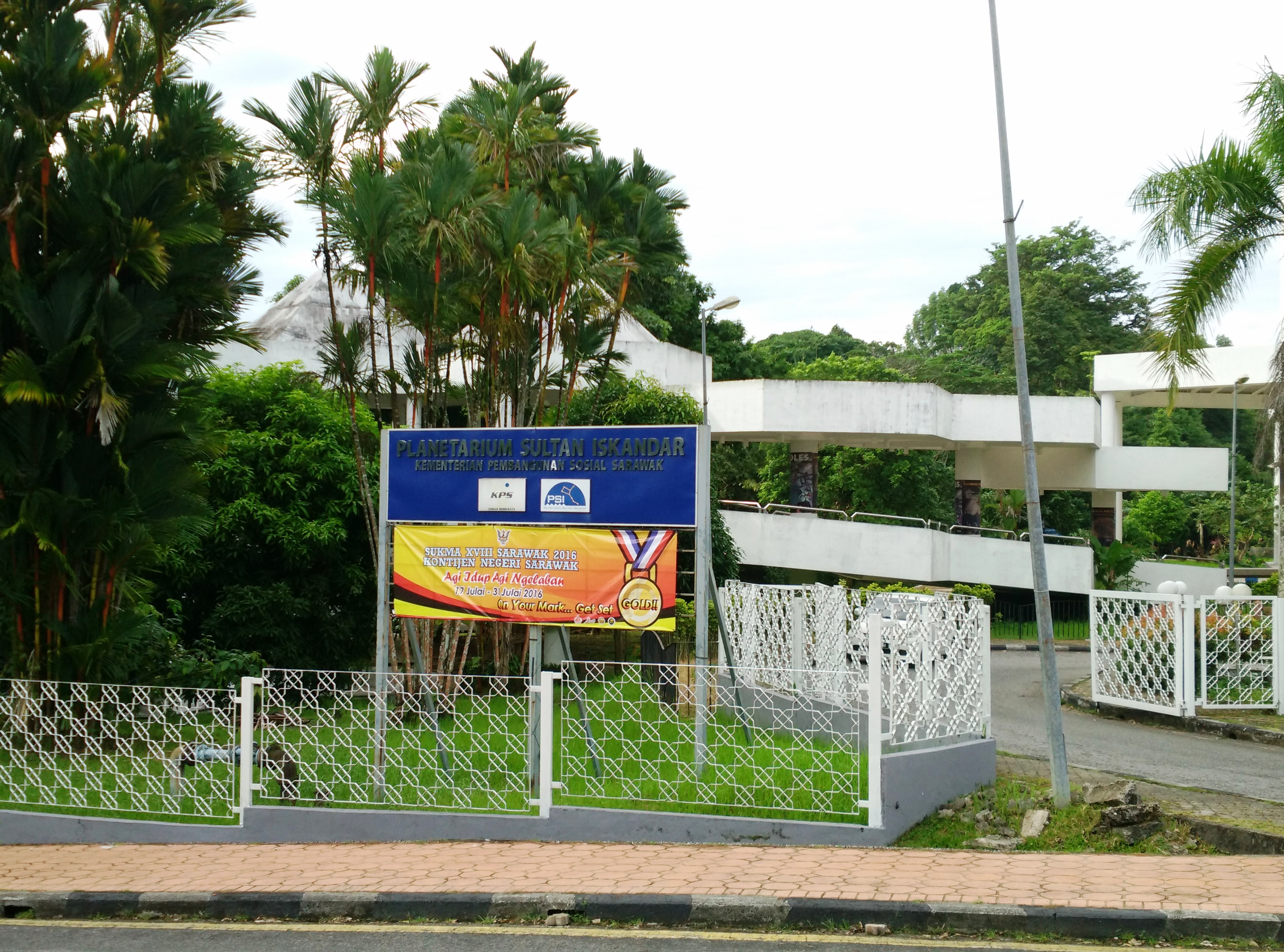
- The main entrance of Planetarium Sultan Iskandar
- Established: 19 January 1989
- Location: Kuching, Sarawak, Malaysia
- Coordinates: 1°32′52.76″N 110°20′41.03″E
- Type: Science museum
- Visitors: 10,500 (2009); 8,063 (2010); 16,726 (2011); 19,800 (2012); 16,925 (2013); 17,526 (2014)
- Curators: Adolph Kunert (1989–1990); Dr. Zalia Morshidi (1990–1994); Rozalina Annuar (1999); Ismandy Ali (2006–present)
- Owner: Ministry of Education, Innovation and Talent Development of Sarawak
- Public transit access: None
- Parking: Kuching Civic Centre
- Website: www.planetarium-sarawak.org

The Sultan Iskandar Planetarium (Malay: Planetarium Sultan Iskandar) is a planetarium in Kuching, Sarawak, Malaysia. It is also the first planetarium to be constructed in Malaysia.

== History ==
The RM 3 million planetarium was constructed along with RM 30 million Kuching Civic Centre. It was officiated by Sultan Iskandar of Johor who was the then Yang di-Pertuan Agong of Malaysia on 19 January 1989 and was opened to the public on 1 March 1989. The planetarium has a sitting capacity of 172, equipped with a white dome of 15 metres in diameter, fitted with four projectors, and lightning facilities. The planetarium uses a German-made Zeiss projector which can show 5000 stars, a moon, and several special effects. The main purpose of this planetarium is to show educational videos about astronomy and to give the audience an experience of the outer space. The first show screened in the planetarium was a documentary about the moon made by a professor from the National University of Malaysia (UKM). The first curator of this planetarium was a German citizen named Adolph Kunert. He was appointed to the position for one year before he returned to his home country. Among the programmes organised by the planetarium are: school holiday space science programmes, entourage to Sabah solar eclipse observations, camps, astoquiz, Astronomy Day, exhibitions and roadshows. The planetarium also offers industry training programmes for Information Technology, Science, and Social Science students.
