= C22H26O5 =

The molecular formula C_{22}H_{26}O_{5} may refer to:

- Calanolide A, an experimental non-nucleoside reverse transcriptase inhibitor
- Hydroxyestrone diacetate, a synthetic, steroidal estrogen
