= Sarikei Division =

Sarikei
- Divisions of Sarawak

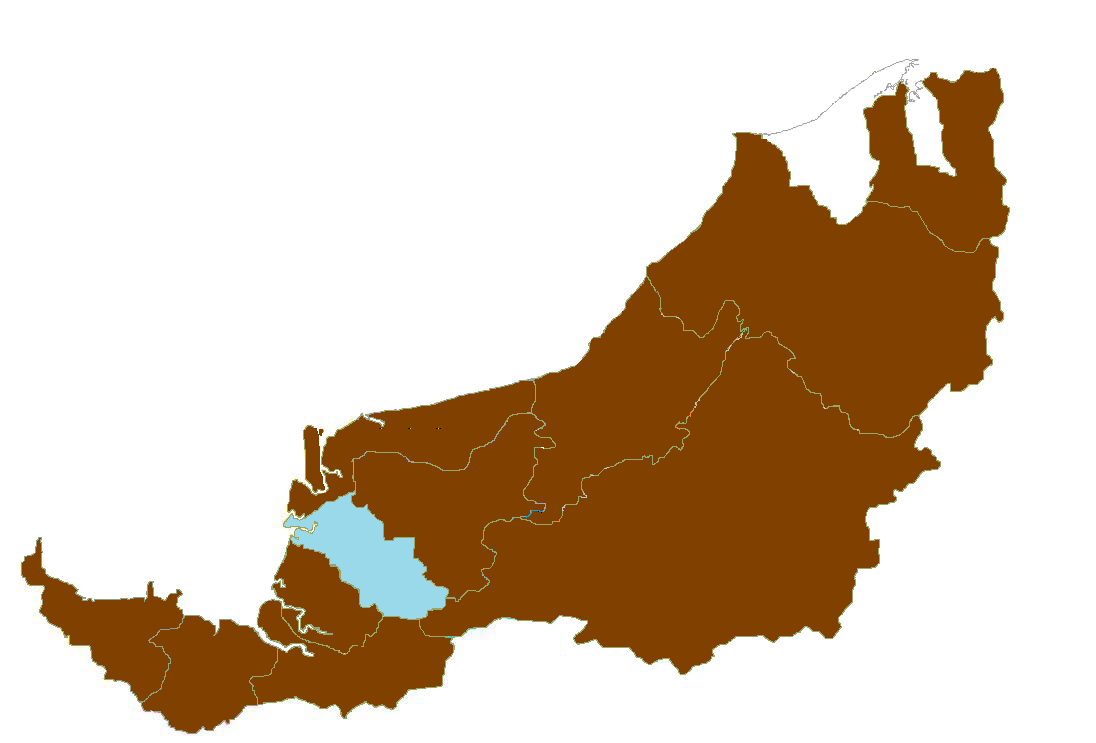
- Local area government(s): Majlis Daerah Sarikei (MDS); Majlis Daerah Meradong dan Julau (MDMJ) (Meradong and Julau and Pakan

Area
  - Total: 4,332.4 km^{2} (1,672.7 sq mi)

Population (2010)
  - Total: 116,290
  - Density: 26.842/km^{2} (69.520/sq mi)
- Resident: Felicia Tan Ya Hua
- License plate prefix: QF, QR
- Website: Sarikei Administrative Division

Sarikei Division is one of the twelve administrative divisions in Sarawak, Malaysia. Formerly part of the Third Division, which included Sibu and Kapit, Sarikei Division has a total area of 4,332.4 square kilometres (1,672.7 sq mi), and is the second smallest of the administrative divisions of Sarawak.

Sarikei Division contains four administrative districts: Sarikei, Meradong, Julau and Pakan.

== History and background ==
The early history of Sarikei can be traced as far back as the early 19th century. There are many historical events to show its existence. Rajah James Brooke first visited Sarikei on 30 April 1845. There was also resistance from the local people towards Brooke's administration, including the burning of Sarikei on 4 January 1856 and the Julau Expedition on 19 June 1856, which was led by Sir Charles Brooke to counter the native resistance in Julau.

The establishment of Sarikei as a new division was mainly based on security consideration. Datu Wilson Baya Dandot, the Deputy State Secretary (Planning and Development) in his article entitled "Sarawak’s Unique Administrative Identity: Establishment of Divisional, District and Sub-District Machinery For Enhancing Development Administration" said that the establishment of Sarikei as the Sixth Division then was due to the security threats posed by the communist insurgency which was at its height at that time. It was felt that with the establishment of a new Sarikei Division the government would be able to concentrate and focus more in its efforts to contain and counter the security problem in the area.

== Residents Roll of Honor ==
- Chin Ting Ming
- Datuk Wan Hashim Bin Tuanku Taha
- Tuan Hj Adenan B Hj Aman
- Tuan Hj Mohd Iskandar B Abdullah
- Noel Hudson Laga
- Patrick Rigep Nuek
- Nilie Tangai
- Jolhi B Hj Saar
- Tuan Hj Mohd Atei Abang Medaan
- Liaw Soon Eng
- Sim Nyuk Foh
- Isaka Kana

== Demographics ==
The total population is 115,529. The population is ethnically mixed, with half of the population is Iban followed by Melanau, Malay, Bidayuh and Chinese predominating. The majority of the people live in Sarikei town.

Sarikei Division ethnic statistics
Administrative district	Total population	Malay	Iban	Bidayuh	Melanau	Orang Ulu	Chinese	Indian	Eurasian	Non-citizen
Sarikei	56,228	9,192	18,559	456	3,933	594	21,772	116	370	1,236
Meradong	28,713	4,450	12,322	217	1,489	282	8,731	93	92	1,037
Julau	15,449	245	14,504	59	60	94	435	7	12	30
Pakan	15,139	125	14,423	26	39	136	289	13	35	53
Total Sarikei Division	115,529	14,012	59,808	758	5,521	1,106	31,227	229	509	2,356

== Economy ==
The economy of the division is mostly agricultural. Sarikei Division produces more pepper than any other divisions in Sarawak. It is also famous for fruits, especially pineapples and oranges. The timber industry, as elsewhere in Sarawak, is also a major component of the local economy.

== Administration ==
Administrative districts of Sarikei Division.

=== Members of Parliament ===
Parliament	Member of Parliament	Party
P206 Tanjung Manis	YB Tuan Yusuf Abd Wahab	GPS (PBB)
P208 Sarikei	YB Tuan Wong Ling Biu	PH (DAP)
P209 Julau	YB Tuan Larry S'ng	IND

=== Member of State Assembly ===
#	Constituency	Member of state assembly	Party	Preceded by
N41	Kuala Rajang (previously known as Belawai)	Len Talif Salleh	BN-PBB	Len Talif Salleh (BN-PBB)
N42	Semop	Abdullah Saidol	BN-PBB	Abdullah Saidol (BN-PBB)
N45	Repok	Huang Tiong Sii	BN-SUPP	Wong Hua Seh (PH-DAP)
N46	Meradong	Ding Kuong Hiing	BN-SUPP	Ting Tze Fui (PH-DAP)
N47	Pakan	William Mawan Ikom	BN	William Mawan Ikom (TERAS)
N48	Meluan	Rolland Duat Jubin	BN-SPDP	Wong Judat (SWP)

== Transportation ==
Sarikei is the centre of the administrative division and it can be reached by land, water and air transportation via Sibu Airport.

=== Public transport ===
From	To	Transportation	Duration
Kuching International Airport	Sibu Airport	Flight	35–40 minutes
Sibu Airport	Sarikei	Bus/Taxi (from Sibu Town Centre)	64 km/45 minutes
Terminal Ekspress Bintawa, Kuching	Terminal 1, Sarikei	Express bot	3 hours 30 minutes
Kuching Sentral	Terminal Bas Ekspress Sarikei	Express bus	360 km/6 hours

=== Own transport ===
One also can drive from Kuching to Sarikei (360 km/6 hours) or from Sibu to Sarikei (64 km/45 minutes).

== See also ==
- Sarawak
- Sarikei
