= Government of Sarawak =

Malaysian state government

Sarawak State Government
- Kerajaan Negeri Sarawak
- State government
- Coat of arms of Sarawak

Overview
- Established: 22 July 1963 (63 years ago)
- State: Sarawak
- Leader: Premier
- Appointed by: Yang di-Pertua Negeri
- Main organ: Cabinet of Sarawak
- Ministries: 18 ministries
- Responsible to: Legislative Assembly
- Annual budget: RM 184.9 billion (2025)
- Headquarters: Wisma Bapa Malaysia; Petra Jaya, Kuching, Sarawak; Malaysia
- Website: Official website

The Sarawak Government is an authority governing Sarawak, one of the Borneo states of Malaysia, and is based in Kuching, the state capital. The state government adheres to and is created by both the Federal Constitution of Malaysia, the supreme law of Malaysia, and the Constitution of the State of Sarawak, the supreme law of the State.

The state government has only two branches: executive and legislative. Sarawak has no judiciary branch due to the federalisation of the court system in Malaysia. Although Sarawak has jurisdictions over Sharia and Native Courts (and their respective laws), both courts are still considered parts of the state executive branch.

== Legislative ==
The state legislature consists of only a unicameral house called the State Legislative Assembly. All 82 members of the Assembly are elected from single-member districts by universal adult suffrage. The Assembly follows a multi-party system, and the governing body is elected through a first-past-the-post system. The state, however, may appoint up to six nominated members of the Assembly based on conditions provided by the state constitution.

By law, the Assembly has a maximum mandate of five years. The Governor may dissolve the state legislature at any time and usually does so upon the advice of the Premier.

== Executive ==
=== Cabinet ===
Executive power vested in the Cabinet led by the Premier. The State Constitution stipulates that the Premier must be a member of the State Legislative Assembly who, in the opinion of the Yang di-Pertua Negeri, commands a majority in the State Legislative Assembly. The Cabinet is chosen among members of the State Legislative Assembly and is responsible to that body. The executive branch of the government consists of the Premier as the head of the government, followed by the various ministers of the Cabinet.

=== State departments, agencies and companies ===
Since 10 February 2025, Government of Sarawak comprises these following ministries, which subsequently divided to following agencies:

| Ministry | State agencies |
|---|---|
| Premier's Department | State departments: Kuching North City Hall (DBKU); Governor's Office; Office of the Premier of Sarawak; State Legislative Assembly (Website); State Secretary's Office; State Attorney-General's Chambers; State Financial Secretary's Office; State Public Service Commission (PSC); Deputy State Secretary's Office (Socioeconomic Transformation); Deputy State Secretary's Office (Rural Transformation); Deputy State Secretary's Office (Performance and Service Delivery Transformation); Betong Resident's Office; Betong District Office; Kabong District Office; Pusa District Office; Saratok District Office; Bintulu Resident's Office; Bintulu District Office; Sebauh District Office; Tatau District Office; General Administration Unit; Internal Audit Unit; Kapit Resident's Office; Belaga District Office; Bukit Mabong District Office; Kapit District Office; Song District Office; Kuching Resident's Office; Bau District Office; Kuching District Office; Lundu District Office; Limbang Resident's Office; Lawas District Office; Limbang District Office; Miri Resident's Office; Beluru District Office; Marudi District Office; Miri District Office; Subis District Office; Telang Usan District Office; Mukah Resident's Office; Dalat District Office; Daro District Office; Matu District Office; Mukah District Office; Tanjung Manis District Office; Native Courts; Samarahan Resident's Office; Asajaya District Office; Samarahan District Office; Simunjan District Office; Sarawak Islamic Affairs Department (JAIS); Sarawak Syariah Judiciary Department; Sarawak State Mufti's Department; Sarawak State Treasury Department; Sarikei Resident's Office; Julau District Office; Meradong District Office; Pakan District Office; Sarikei District Office; Serian Resident's Office; Serian District Office; Tebedu District Office; Sibu Resident's Office; Kanowit District Office; Selangau District Office; Sibu District Office; Sri Aman Resident's Office; Lubok Antu District Office; Sri Aman District Office; State Human Resources Unit; State Implementation Monitoring Unit; State Planning Unit; State Protocol and Public Relations Unit (UPPAN); Sarawak Public Communication Unit (UKAS); State Security and Enforcement Unit; State Service Modernisation Unit; Unit for Other Religions (UNIFOR); State statutory boards: Bintulu Development Authority (BDA); Council for Customs and Traditions; Regional Corridor Development Authority (RECODA); Sarawak Baitulmal Fund (TBS); Sarawak Digital Economy Corporation (SDEC); Sarawak Economic Development Corporation (SEDC); Sarawak Foundation; Sarawak Islamic Council (MIS); State-owned companies: Leadership Institute; Sarawak Centre of Performance Excellence Sdn. Bhd. (SCOPE); Sarawak Convention Bureau (SCB); Invest Sarawak; Sarawak Media Group (SMG) |
| Ministry of Education, Innovation and Talent Development | State departments: Sultan Iskandar Planetarium (PSI); State statutory bodies: Sarawak Biodiversity Centre (SBC); Sarawak Research and Development Council (SRDC); Sarawak Tropical Peat Research Institute (TROPI); Tabung Ekonomi Gagasan Anak Sarawak (TEGAS); Universiti Malaysia Sarawak (UNIMAS); Universiti Teknologi MARA (UiTM) Sarawak; State-owned companies: CRAUN Research Sdn. Bhd.; Swinburne University of Technology Sarawak; Curtin University Malaysia, Sarawak |
| Ministry of Infrastructure and Port Development | State departments: Public Works Department of Sarawak (JKR); State statutory boards: Brooke Dockyard and Engineering Works Corporation; Kuching Port Authority (KPA); Miri Port Authority; Rajang Port Authority; Bintulu Port Authority; Tanjung Manis Port Authority (TMPA) |
| Ministry of International Trade, Industry and Investment | State-owned companies: Petroleum Sarawak Berhad (PETROS) |
| Ministry of Modernisation of Agriculture and Regional Development | State departments: Department of Agriculture (DOA); Department of Veterinary Services (DVS); Department of Irrigation and Drainage (DID); State statutory bodies: Sarawak Land Development Board (SLDB); Sarawak Land Consolidation and Rehabilitation Authority (SALCRA); State Farmers' Organisation (PPN) |
| Ministry of Natural Resources and Urban Development | State departments: Forestry Department; Land and Survey Department; State statutory bodies: Land Custody and Development Authority (LCDA); Natural Resources and Environment Board (NREB); Sarawak Forestry Corporation; Sarawak Timber Industry Development Corporation |
| Ministry of Public Health, Housing and Local Government | State departments: Sewerage Services Department (SSD); State statutory bodies: Kuching South City Council (MBKS); Bau District Council; Betong District Council; Dalat and Mukah District Council; Housing Development Corporation (HDC); Kanowit District Council; Kapit District Council; Kota Samarahan Municipal Council; Lawas District Council; Limbang District Council; Lubok Antu District Council; Lundu District Council; Matu and Daro District Council; Marudi District Council; Meradong and Julau District Council; Miri City Council; Padawan Municipal Council; Sibu Rural District Council; Saratok District Council; Sarikei District Council; Serian District Council; Sibu Municipal Council; Simunjan District Council; Sri Aman District Council; Subis District Council |
| Ministry of Tourism, Creative Industry and Performing Arts | State departments: Museum Department; State statutory bodies: Sarawak Arts Council; Sarawak Craft Council; Sarawak State Library (SSL); Sarawak Tourism Board (STB) |
| Ministry of Transport | State statutory bodies: Sarawak Rivers Board (SRB); Sarawak Metro; State-owned companies: AirBorneo |
| Ministry of Utilities and Telecommunication | State departments: Rural Water Supply Department (JBALB); State statutory boards: Kuching Water Board (KWB); Sarawak Multimedia Authority (SMA); Sibu Water Board (SWB); State-owned companies: LAKU Management Sdn. Bhd.; Sarawak Energy Bhd.; Sarawak Information Systems Sdn. Bhd. |
| Ministry of Women, Early Childhood and Community Wellbeing Development | State departments: Women and Family Department (JWKS); Social Welfare Department (JKM); State-owned companies: Centre for Technology Excellence Sarawak (CENTEXS) |
| Ministry of Youth, Sports and Entrepreneurship Development | State statutory bodies: Sarawak Sports Corporation (SSC); Sarawak State Sports Council (MSN Sarawak) |

== Head of government ==
The Premier of Sarawak (Malay: Premier Sarawak), formerly the Chief Minister of Sarawak (Malay: Ketua Menteri Sarawak), is the indirectly elected head of government of Sarawak. He is officially appointed by the Governor, who in His Excellency's judgement is likely to command the confidence of the majority of the members of State Legislative Assembly. He heads the State Cabinet, whose members are appointed by the Yang di-Pertua Negeri on the advice of the Premier. The Premier and his Cabinet shall be collectively responsible to State Legislative Assembly. The Premier's Department is the body and ministry in which the Premier exercises its functions and powers.

== Relationship with Malaysian federal government ==
Relationship of Sarawak state government with federal government of Malaysia are generally cozy except during 1966 Sarawak constitutional crisis when the then Sarawak chief minister Stephen Kalong Ningkan went into conflicts on various issues pertaining to the usage of Malay language in Sarawak, expatriate issue in Sarawak civil service, and appointment of Governor of Sarawak. The Parliament of Malaysia then used emergency powers to amend the constitution of Sarawak to facilitate the removal of Ningkan from office. In September 1966, Tawi Sli was installed as the new chief minister who was more acceptable to the federal government. However, his cabinet minister, Abdul Taib Mahmud dominated most of the decision making. In 1970, Abdul Rahman Ya'kub was considered as the first federal "proxy" to be installed as the third chief minister of Sarawak for his undivided loyalty to the federal government. In 1981, Abdul Taib Mahmud was installed as the fourth chief minister. The federal government adopted "hands off" approach as long as Sarawak parties consistently delivers overwhelming number of parliamentary seats to the federal government.

In 2008 Malaysian general election, the federal government lost two-third majority in parliament. This makes the federal more reliant on support from the east Malaysian states of Sabah and Sarawak to cling on power. Both east Malaysian states started to ask for more representatives in the Malaysian federal cabinet and more budget allocations. Adenan Satem, after took over the chief minister post in 2014, had asked for greater autonomy and empowerment from federal government to recognise Sarawak Day on 22 July 1963, increase in oil royalty from 5% to 20%, and greater autonomy as enshrined in Constitution of Malaysia, and re-examine the documents such as Malaysia Agreement, Inter-government committee (IGC) report and Cobbold Commission report. This is because the federal government had "shortchanged" Sarawak throughout its 50 years within Malaysia; despite Sarawak is rich in natural resources, its basic infrastructure is still lacking and poorly maintained. Adenan also made English as the second official language of Sarawak (first official language being the Malay language) and recognised Unified Examination Certificate (UEC), in contrast to federal government policy that made the Malay language the sole official language of Malaysia and refused to recognise UEC certificate.

Abang Abdul Rahman Johari Abang Openg continued Adenan policy of demanding more autonomy for Sarawak after he took over the chief minister post in January 2017. In 2018, Abang Johari decided to pull out all of his affiliated political parties from the Barisan Nasional (BN) national coalition to form state-based Sarawak Parties Alliance in light of the BN defeat in the 2018 Malaysian general election. He also started to enforce 5% sales tax on petroleum products in 2019 and asked Petronas, national oil and gas corporation wholly owned by the federal government to pay for the sales tax. Petronas refused to pay the sales tax and the case was brought to the high court. In March 2020, high court ruled that Sarawak has power to levy sales tax and Petronas is entitled to pay for it. In February 2022, Abang Johari passed a motion in state assembly to rename the chief minister post to "Premier". Such act received criticism from Dewan Bahasa dan Pustaka, a federal government agency of coordinating the usage of Malay language and conflicts of translation into Mandarin language between Chinese groups in Sarawak and Peninsular Malaysia.
