= Len Salleh =

Malaysian politician

Yang Berhormat Datuk Datu Haji Len Salleh MLA PGBK DJBS
- لن سالله

Deputy Minister for Natural Resources and Urban Development
- Incumbent
- Assumed office 2022
- Governor: Abdul Taib Mahmud (2022-2024); Wan Junaidi Tuanku Jaafar (since 2024)
- Premier: Abang Johari
- Preceded by: Position established

Member of the Sarawak State Legislative Assembly for Kuala Rajang
- Incumbent
- Assumed office 2016
- Preceded by: Constituency created

Member of the Sarawak State Legislative Assembly for Belawai
- In office 2011–2016
- Preceded by: Hamden Ahmad
- Succeeded by: Constituency abolished

Personal details
- Born: Len bin Salleh Sarawak
- Citizenship: Malaysian
- Party: PBB
- Other political affiliations: Barisan Nasional (till 2018); Gabungan Parti Sarawak (since 2018)
- Occupation: Politician

Talif @ Len bin Salleh is a Malaysian politician from PBB. He has served as the Member of the Sarawak State Legislative Assembly for Kuala Rajang since 2016, for Belawai from 2011 to 2016. He is also the Sarawak Deputy Minister for Natural Resources and Urban Development.

== Election results ==
Sarawak State Legislative Assembly
| Year | Constituency | Candidate | Votes | Pct. | Opponent(s) | Votes | Pct. | Ballots cast | Majority | Turnout |
|---|---|---|---|---|---|---|---|---|---|---|
| 2011 | N35 Belawai | Len Salleh (PBB) | 5,164 | 87.30% | Abdul Wahab Abdullah (PKR) | 618 | 10.45% | 6,049 | 4,546 | 70.15% |
| 2011 | N35 Belawai | Len Salleh (PBB) | 5,164 | 87.30% | Kiprawi Suhaili (IND) | 133 | 2.25% | 6,049 | 4,546 | 70.15% |
| 2016 | N41 Kuala Rajang | Len Salleh (PBB) | 6,235 | 88.60% | Sopian Julaihi (AMANAH) | 649 | 9.22% | 7,227 | 5,586 | 70.45% |
| 2016 | N41 Kuala Rajang | Len Salleh (PBB) | 6,235 | 88.60% | Asbor Abdullah (IND) | 153 | 2.17% | 7,227 | 5,586 | 70.45% |
| 2021 | N41 Kuala Rajang | Len Salleh (PBB) | 5,268 | 70.35% | Abang Aditajaya Abang Alwi (IND) | 1,943 | 25.95% | 7,662 | 3,325 | 67.05% |
| 2021 | N41 Kuala Rajang | Len Salleh (PBB) | 5,268 | 70.35% | Abdul Mutalip Abdullah (IND) | 168 | 2.24% | 7,662 | 3,325 | 67.05% |
| 2021 | N41 Kuala Rajang | Len Salleh (PBB) | 5,268 | 70.35% | Wong Ling Ching (PBK) | 109 | 1.46% | 7,662 | 3,325 | 67.05% |

== Honours ==
- Sarawak :
  - Recipient of the Order of Meritorious Service to Sarawak (DJBS) – Datu (2006)
  - Commander of the Order of the Star of Hornbill Sarawak (PGBK) – Datuk (2022)
