= Sarawak Tropical Peat Research Institute =

Malaysian research institute

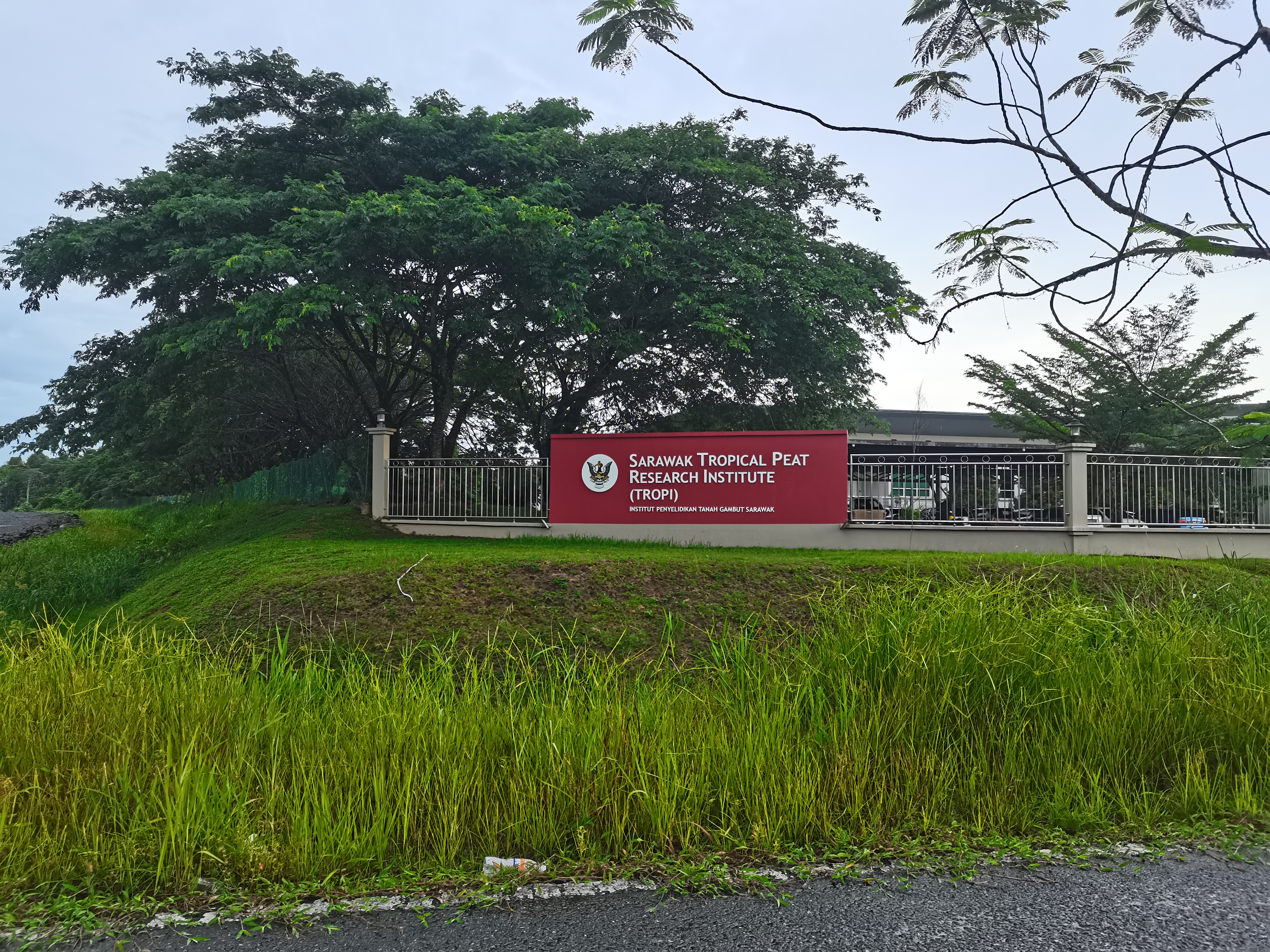
- Sarawak Tropical Peat Research Institute signage
- Established: 26 June 2008
- Mission: To develop scientific, technical knowledge and understanding for the responsible management and conservation of tropical peat & peatland
- Focus: Tropical peatland study
- Owner: Sarawak state government
- Location: Lot 6035, Kuching - Kota Samarahan Expressway, Kota Samarahan, Sarawak, Malaysia
- Coordinates: 1°28′55″N 110°25′31″E
- Interactive map of Sarawak Tropical Peat Research Institute
- Website: http://sarawaktropi.my/

Sarawak Tropical Peat Research Institute (STROPI) is a research institute that was set up by the government of Sarawak in 2008, with the stated aim of conducting research on tropical peatland in Sarawak. Its claims which suggest that agriculture practices on peatlands have minimal impact on their roles as carbon sources, are used to justify the development of tropical peatland for agricultural purposes, contrary to the broad scientific consensus on peatlands and its impact on climate change.

== History ==
Before setting up the tropical peat research institute, the Sarawak government was concerned with international non-governmental organisations (NGO) lobbying in Europe that calls for an import ban of palm oil coming from tropical peatlands because of the claims that cultivation of oil palms on peatland contributes to global greenhouse gases emissions. Therefore, on 26 June 2008, Sarawak State Legislative Assembly passed a law to establish Tropical Peat Research Laboratory. In 2010, eddy covariance flux towers were set up in three locations in Sarawak namely: Sibu, Maludam National Park, and Lambir Hills National Park. The flux towers are co-managed together with researchers from Hokkaido University and National Institute for Environmental Studies (NIES), Japan to estimate the net carbon balance from tropical peatlands. In 2012, the flux tower located at Lambir Hills National Park was moved to secondary peat swamp forest in Betong Division. In 2015, the laboratory was moved to a new research complex.

On 7 November 2016, the laboratory was elevated to the newly named “Sarawak Tropical Peat Research Institute” (STROPI). In 2018, the director for STROPI, Dr Lulie Melling was elected as a member of the executive board of the International Peatland Society (IPS), which is an organisation of individual, corporate and institutional members dedicated to the responsible management and Wise Use of peatlands and peat.

In 2019, Sarawak won the bid to host AsiaFlux conference in 2020. Due to the COVID-19 pandemic, the event was postponed to 2021.

== Research ==
Between 2019 and 2020, STROPI was involved in two international collaborations on researches that deal with the long-term thermal sensitivity of Earth's tropical forests and the study of interactions between the beneficial and pathogenic funguses in paddy plants.

== Controversy ==
In September 2016, the first International Peat Congress (IPC) was held in Kuching, Sarawak. During the congress, it was claimed that drainage-based agriculture with soil compaction is able to reduce carbon emission into the atmosphere. However, after the event, 139 international scientists with expertise in peatland science, had later signed a letter disputing the same unsubstantiated claims at the 2016 Congress, by stating that claimed methods to reduce carbon emissions from peatlands, lacked any empirical evidence to prove its claims.

In a seminal article regarding peatlands' relevance to carbon emissions, which was published in November 2021 by The Washington Post, it was revealed that the 2016 event was an attempt at greenwashing by the government of Sarawak and commercial palm oil advocacy groups, as the relevant international peatland scientists were sidelined (within small basement rooms), in favour of the palm oil industry which were claiming (without any empirical evidence) that Malaysian peatlands had been greatly managed for oil palm. Various news organizations from the region (The Jakarta Post and The Borneo Post), were also invited to publish Sarawak state propaganda, which was contrary to scientific consensus regarding peat, misrepresented the abundance of peer-reviewed studies on peatland emissions by international scientific community, and largely consists of pseudoscience or junk science. Previous scientific evidence had previously established that as peatland is drained (most commonly due to the plantation of oil palms), it releases a rapid pulse of carbon dioxide and other greenhouse gases as the once-waterlogged plants’ remains degrade with the sudden exposure to air; emissions then continue for decades, until all the peat is gone.

In her written rebuttal to the Post, Lulie Melling, the director of STROPI, engaged in climate change denial by stating that agriculture practices on peatlands have minimal impact on their roles as carbon sources, contrary to the broad scientific consensus of the impact of drying peatland on climate change. She also claimed without peer-reviewed empirical evidence, that other peat scientists, who have studied peat in other parts of the world, don’t understand the unique qualities of the peat in her region.

"It’s like comparing cheesecake with Swiss cheese."

Melling has often advanced scientific skepticism and pseudoskepticism in unusually nationalist or anti-colonialist terms that have little to no bearing on advancing science through the scientific method; she instead promotes the fallacy of begging the question.

"I was a shock to the nation and our besieged oil palm industry then because I was not from any well-funded research organisation, yet I single handedly, backed by my small laboratory, pioneered and published the ground breaking research work on peat use and GHG emission to rebut the maligned western detractors on the use of peat as arable land. I was also hailed as the pioneer for tropical peatland research in the world. Sarawak had been subjected to negative comments on oil palm plantations on peatlands in the state and there was even a call for a moratorium on the oil palm expansion. TROPI is now in the frontline on behalf of the state to inform the public that agriculture practices on peatlands have minimal impact on their roles as carbon sources. And today, more than 50 percent of the oil palm revenue for the state is from peatlands.

— Dr. Lulie Melling, director of Tropical Peat Research Laboratory (TPRL) Unit in the Chief Minister’s Department of Sarawak, New Sarawak Tribune

As STROPI is unusually under the direct purview of the Chief Minister of Sarawak (instead of the broader state civil service) and was created as a response to the broad scientific consensus against the usage of peatlands for agricultural use (which accelerates the release of carbon dioxide into the air), it is subject to undue influence by the highest political leader of the state and represents a politicization of science, by promoting the interests of the palm oil industry in defiance of scientific consensus, in an effort to manipulate public policy and entrench the existing political structure. STROPI's research activities are funded by the executive branch of state government of Sarawak, which in turn is highly dependent on revenue derived from palm oil grown on peatland within the state, STROPI's findings (that do not possess relevant empirical evidence) are subject to a conflict of interest, whilst publications by STROPI which were not peer-reviewed, are subject to conflicts of interest in academic publishing.
