= Calanolide A =

Chemical compound

Clinical data
- ATC code: none

Pharmacokinetic data
- Protein binding: >97%
- Metabolism: Hepatic (mostly CYP3A4-mediated)

Identifiers
- IUPAC name: (+)-[10R,11S,12S]-10,11-trans-dihydro- 12-hydroxy-6,6,10,11-tetramethyl-4-propyl- 2H,6H-benzo[1,2-b:3,4-b':5,6-b'']tripyran-2-one
- CAS Number: 142632-32-4
- PubChem CID: 64972
- ChemSpider: 58497
- UNII: S5A9TQN46W
- ChEMBL: ChEMBL267447
- CompTox Dashboard (EPA): DTXSID601316787

Chemical and physical data
- Formula: C_{22}H_{26}O_{5}
- Molar mass: 370.445 g·mol^{−1}
- 3D model (JSmol): Interactive image
- SMILES: O=C/4Oc2c(c3OC(/C=C\c3c1O[C@@H]([C@@H](C)[C@H](O)c12)C)(C)C)\C(=C\4)CCC
- InChI: InChI=1S/C22H26O5/c1-6-7-13-10-15(23)26-21-16(13)20-14(8-9-22(4,5)27-20)19-17(21)18(24)11(2)12(3)25-19/h8-12,18,24H,6-7H2,1-5H3/t11-,12-,18+/m1/s1; Key:NIDRYBLTWYFCFV-FMTVUPSXSA-N

Calanolide A is an experimental non-nucleoside reverse transcriptase inhibitor (NNRTI). This compound was extracted from the tree Calophyllum lanigerum, of variety austrocoriaceum, in Lundu, Malaysian state of Sarawak in 1992 by United States National Cancer Institute (NCI). Due to rarity of the raw materials and low yield of the active ingredient, total synthesis of the compound was devised in 1996. For the same reason, its sister compound (-)-Calanolide B (also known as Costatolide) have been touted as replacement. As a result of the discovery of Calanolide A, Sarawak Medichem pharmaceuticals company was established as a joint venture between US-based MediChem Research Inc and Craun Research Sdn Bhd, a company owned by the Sarawak state government. In 2006, Craun Research acquired Sarawak MediChem. In 2016, Craun Research announced the completion of Phase I clinical trials for Calanolide A.

== History ==
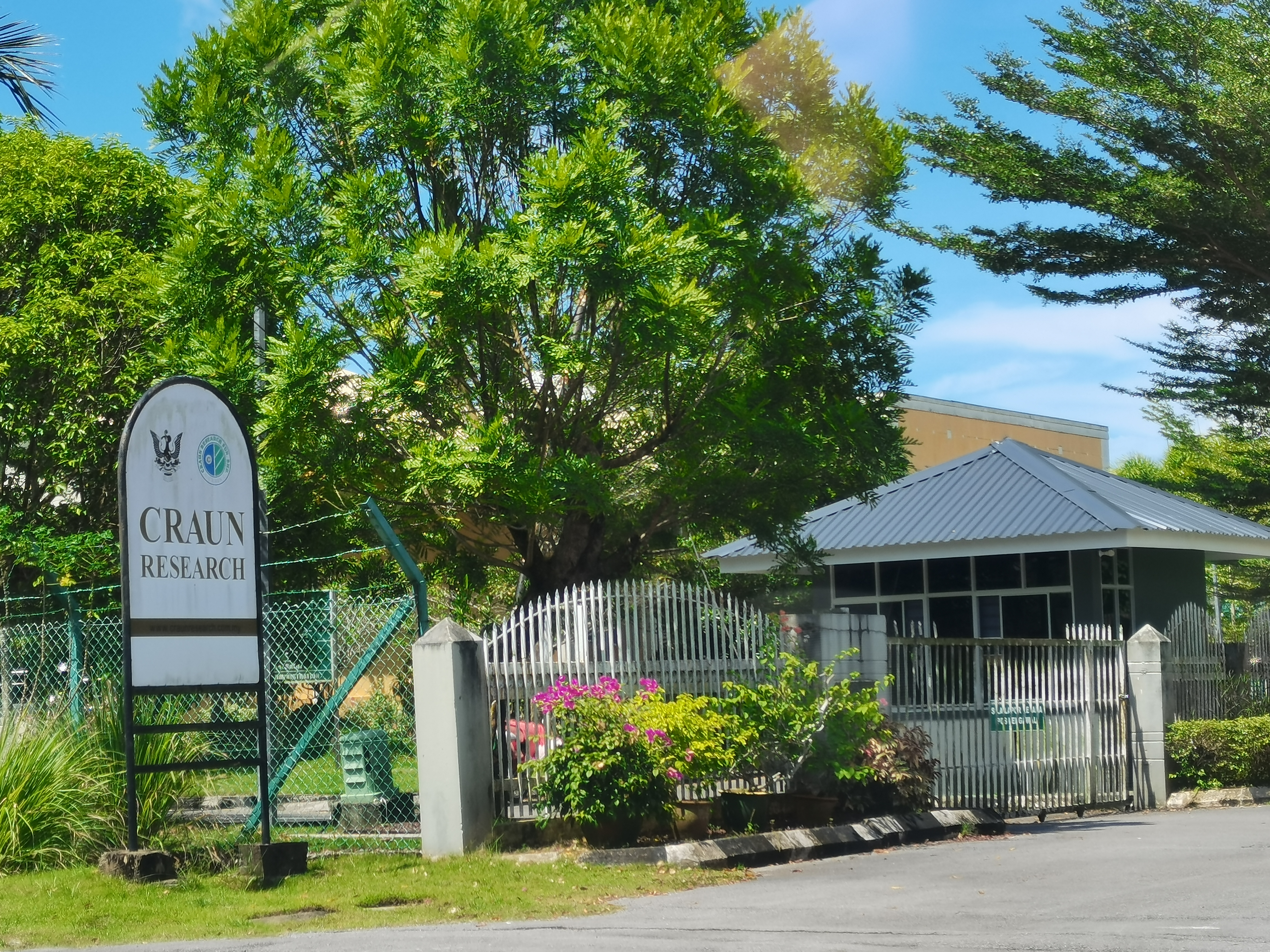
Researches on the Calanolide A drug is conducted by Craun Research Sdn. Bhd., a company owned by the government of Sarawak.

In December 1986, Arnold Arboretum of the Harvard University in Massachusetts, requested permission from government of Sarawak to collaborate with Sarawak forest department to collect plants from Sarawak for phytochemical analysis. Permission was granted in May 1987. The plants collection project was part of the many expeditions launched by United States National Cancer Institute (NCI), to find new natural substances to treat cancer and AIDS infection. In September 1987, a botanist named John Burley went on a mission to collect plant samples from a swamp forest at Lundu, Sarawak, Malaysia. He and his team routinely collected a kilogram of fruits, leaves, and twigs from each type of plant they encountered. Part of the samples were sent to NCI for analysis and the other part was sent to Harvard University Herbaria for safekeeping for future research. A sample which was labelled "Burley-and-Lee-351" although showing no effect when tested against cancer cells in cultures, was able to stop viral replication when tested against HIV-1 virus. The sample was later determined to have come from a tree identified as Calophyllum lanigerum (locally known as Bintangor tree) of variety austrocoriaceum. Sarawak Forest Department was informed of the result in late 1991.

On return trip to Sarawak in March 1992, it was found that the tree had been cut down by local people most likely for fuel and building material. There was no other trees of the same variety existed in the Lundu region. The collectors then returned home with samples from other varieties of the Calophyllum lanigerum species, most of which failed to show any anti-HIV properties. Then, a few existing species were eventually located in the Singapore Botanic Gardens. With sufficient raw materials, the scientists were able to isolate the active ingredient as (+)-Calanolide A. Since the plant source is relatively rare, a method of total synthesis was developed in 1996 which showed same effectiveness against HIV virus when compared to the original compound. In addition, the samples collected from the trip in March 1992 yielded another positive result. A sister compound (-)-Calanolide B (also known as Costatolide) was isolated from the latex of Calophyllum teysmannii var. innophylloide trees. Sarawak Forestry Department was in collaboration with University of Illinois at Chicago (UIC) for sustainable harvest of (-)-Calanolide B. Although Costatolide is less potent than Calanolide A, the yield from raw materials is much higher (20 to 25%) when compared to Calanolide A (0.05%). Therefore, Costatolide had been accepted as replacement for Calanolide A. In June 1993, The Calophyllum Species (Prohibition of Felling and Restriction of Export) Order was issued by the Sarawak state government to ensure adequate supply of the trees for medicinal purposes. In the same year, International Convention on Biological Diversity (CBD) treaty came into effect with 179 countries as its signatories. However, the United States did not sign the treaty. Therefore, the Sarawak state government set up Sarawak Biodiversity Centre (SBC) in 1997 to regulate bioprospecting activities in the state.

In 1994, NCI signed a "letter of collection" with Sarawak state government. NCI also partnered with a small American pharmaceutical company named MediChem Research Inc based in Lemont, Illinois to develop the Calanolide compound. In 1995, NCI granted MediChem all rights to develop the compound. Due to lack of funds, Medichem entered a joint venture with Sarawak state government in 1996 where the former provided technical expertise and facilities for Sarawak scientists. Meanwhile, the state government provided further funding for the development of the compound. Sarawak MediChem pharmaceuticals company was then created as a result of the joint venture. Both partners have 50:50 percent stake in all intellectual property rights of the venture. The Sarawak government entered the joint venture through its wholly owned company named Craun Research Sdn Bhd. The company was established in 1993 for research into commercialisation of sago.

In December 2006, Craun Research acquired Sarawak MediChem Pharmaceuticals. Craun Research collaborates with various contract research organizations in the drug development, such as Nova Laboratories (under Nova Wellness Group). In 2016, Craun Research announced the successful completion of Phase I trial of the drug. In 2019, Dr Annuar Rapaee, Sarawak Assistant Minister for Education, Science and Technological Research admitted the slow progress in developing and commercialising the drug.

== Types and derivatives ==
Since the discovery of Calanolide A, other similar calanolides have been described (from Calanolide B to Calanolide F). All these compounds are derived naturally from the Calophyllum species of plants. Besides, other plants are found to produce Calanolide A other than Calophyllum lanigerum var. austrocoriaceum. These are: Calophyllum brasiliense, Calophyllum inophyllum, Calophyllum teysmannii, and Clausena excavata. Calanolide A exists in the form of oil in its natural physical state.

There are several structure–activity relationships that give Calanolide A its desired anti-HIV activity. A very specific stereochemistry and optical rotation is required for its anti-HIV activity. Besides, racemic mixture of Calanolide A with its enantiomer (±)-12-oxocalanolide A is more active than Calanolide A alone. A C-12 heteroatom is also needed for the activity while medication of C-4 can affect its anti-HIV properties. Hydrogenation of C-7 and C-8 has little effect on its activity. In 2017, F18, a structural analog of Calanolide A could have more potent anti-HIV activity than original molecule.

== Biosynthesis ==
The biosynthesis of Calanolide A in plants is not completely understood. The Calanolide A is synthesised from a precursor molecule L-phenylalanine. The precursor molecule then is converted into umbelliferone. After that, the umbelliferone molecule go through two pathways: either being converted into 5,7-dihydroxycoumarin or osthenol before being converted into dipetalolactone (a pyranocoumarin). Dipetalolactone is then converted into 3-propyl-intermediate. Through Wagner–Meerwein rearrangement reaction, the propyl intermediate is converted into Calanolide A, B, or C with the help of p450 monooxygenase enzyme.

== Pharmacodynamics ==
The drug has half-life of 20 hours. The drug is metabolised by cytochrome P450 CYP3A.

== Mechanism of action ==
Calanolide A is unique among non-nucleoside reverse transcriptase inhibitor (NNRTIs) in that it can bind to two distinct sites on HIV reverse transcriptase enzyme. It may either bind to one or another site in the reverse transcriptase, but not both sites at the same time. The two sites are active site (binding site for 1-ethoxymethyl-5-ethyl-6-phenylthio-2-thiouracil) and Foscarnet (also known as phosphonoformic acid) binding site of the reverse transcriptase enzyme. The drug also acts synergistically with nevirapine in inhibiting HIV-1 virus. Besides, Calanolide A is also a partially competitive inhibitor of dNTP (deoxyribonucleotide triphosphate) binding site of the enzyme. However, mutated T139I reverse transcriptase is resistant to Calanolide A action.

== Therapeutic potential ==
Calanolide A is active against HIV-1 virus but ineffective against HIV-2. It is also active against resistant strains of HIV such as eAZT-resistant G-9106 strain of HIV-1 and pyridinone-resistant A17 strain. It is also active against NNRTI-related mutations of K103N and Y181C. Calanolide A, Costatolide, and dihydrocostatolide can be used together with azidothymidine (AZT), indinavir, nelfinavir, and saquinavir for enhanced activity against the HIV-1 virus.

Although initially, Calanolide A did not show any activity against cancer cell lines in the 1980s, later experimentation in 2003 showed antiproliferative and antitumor-promoting property through inhibition of TPA-induced EBV-EA activation in Raji cell lines. TPA (12-O-Tetradecanoylphorbol-13-acetate) is a tumour promoter used in biomedical research. EBV-EA is Epstein–Barr virus early antigen.

In 2003, the Calanolide A compound was found to have anti-tuberculosis activity. It is active against both drug-susceptible and drug resistant strains of mycobacteria such as H37Ra and H37Rv strains. The antitubercular activities of Calanolide A is comparable to isoniazid and is active against rifampicin and streptomycin resistant M. tuberculosis strains.

== Side effects ==
Calanolide A has a relatively good safety profile. A Phase I clinical trial done in 2001 on 47 healthy subjects showed that the side effects were taste alteration, headache, belching, and nausea.
