= Pakan District =

- Districts of Sarawak
- Interactive map of Pakan District
- District Office location: Pakan
- Local area government(s): Meradong and Julau District Council; Pakan District Office

Area
  - Total: 924.6 km^{2} (357.0 sq mi)

Population (2010)
  - Total: 15,135
  - Density: 16.37/km^{2} (42.40/sq mi)
- Ethnicity: Iban (95.3%); Chinese (1.9%); Malay (0.8%); Non-Malaysians (0.35%); Melanau (0.25%); Bidayuh (0.25%)
- Website: http://www.sarikei.sarawak.gov.my/

Map of Pakan District

Pakan District is an administrative district in Sarikei Division, Sarawak, Malaysia, covering an area of 924.6 square kilometres (357.0 sq mi). The town of Pakan is the capital of the Pakan district, located 45 km from the town of Sarikei.

== History ==
The Pakan area was administered as a sub-district since 1973 which was put under the jurisdiction of Julau District. On 1 March 2002, the area was upgraded into a district and was put under the administration of Sarikei Division.

== Demography ==
There has been a marginal growth of Pakan District population of 1.38% from 1991 to 2000. Meanwhile, from 2000 to 2010, there is a marginal growth of 0.37%.

Year	1980	1991	2000	2010	2020	2030	2040	2050
Total population	12,440	12,882	14,591	15,135	16,990	-	-	-

== Economy ==
According to the figures released by Malaysian Ministry of Rural Development in 2019, Pakan district is the poorest district in Malaysia with household income registered at RM 2,760 per month. Therefore, Pakan district is under the implementation of socio-economic development programmes of the ministry. As of 2019, the employment rate in the district was 96.9%, with 3.4% unemployment, corresponding to 8,800 people employed and 300 people unemployed.

== Town and villages ==
=== Pakan ===
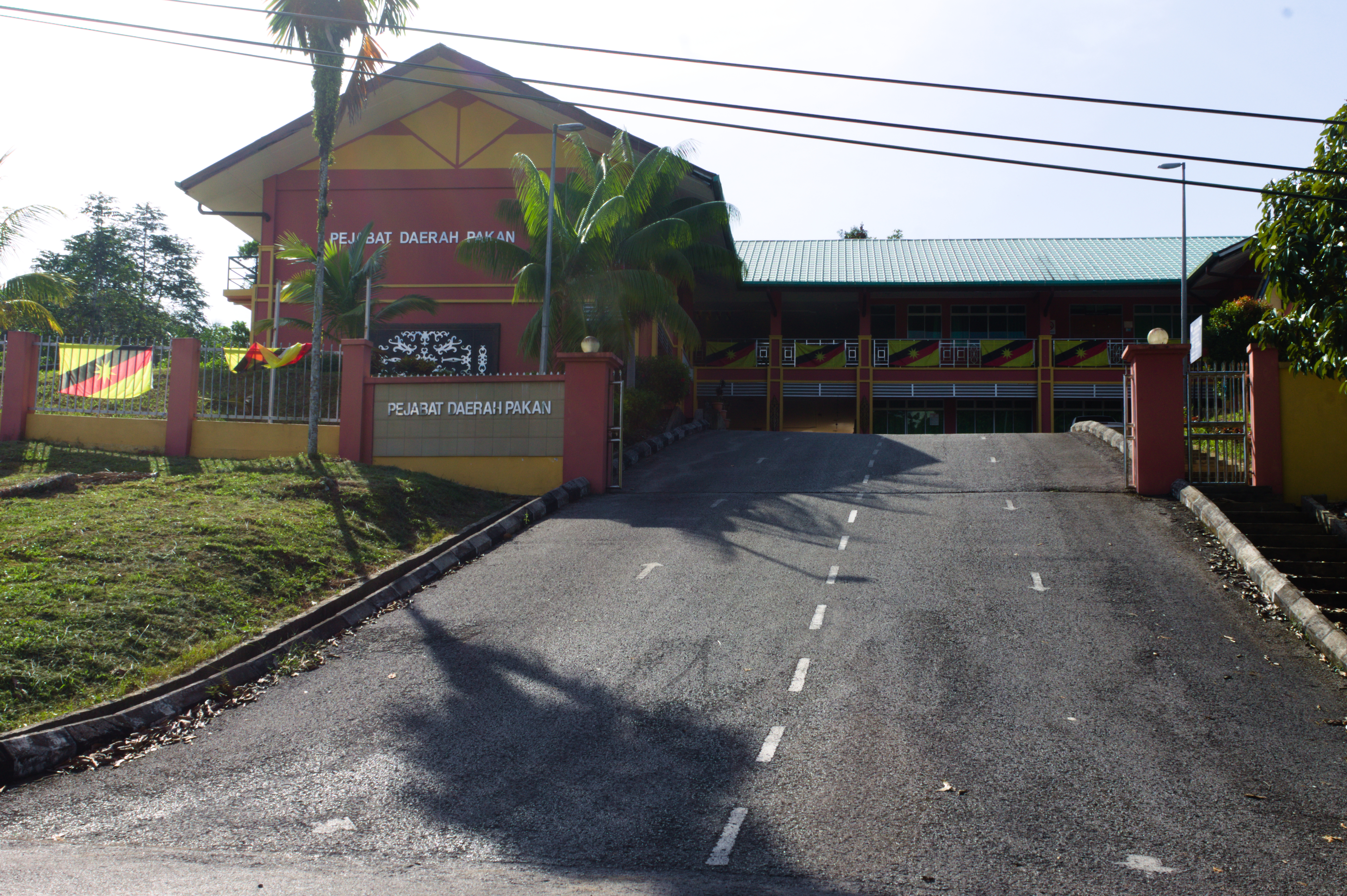
The Pakan District Office

Pakan district office administers the Pakan District.

=== Nanga Entaih ===
Nanga Entaih was connected to tarred road in September 2019.

=== Nanga Wak ===
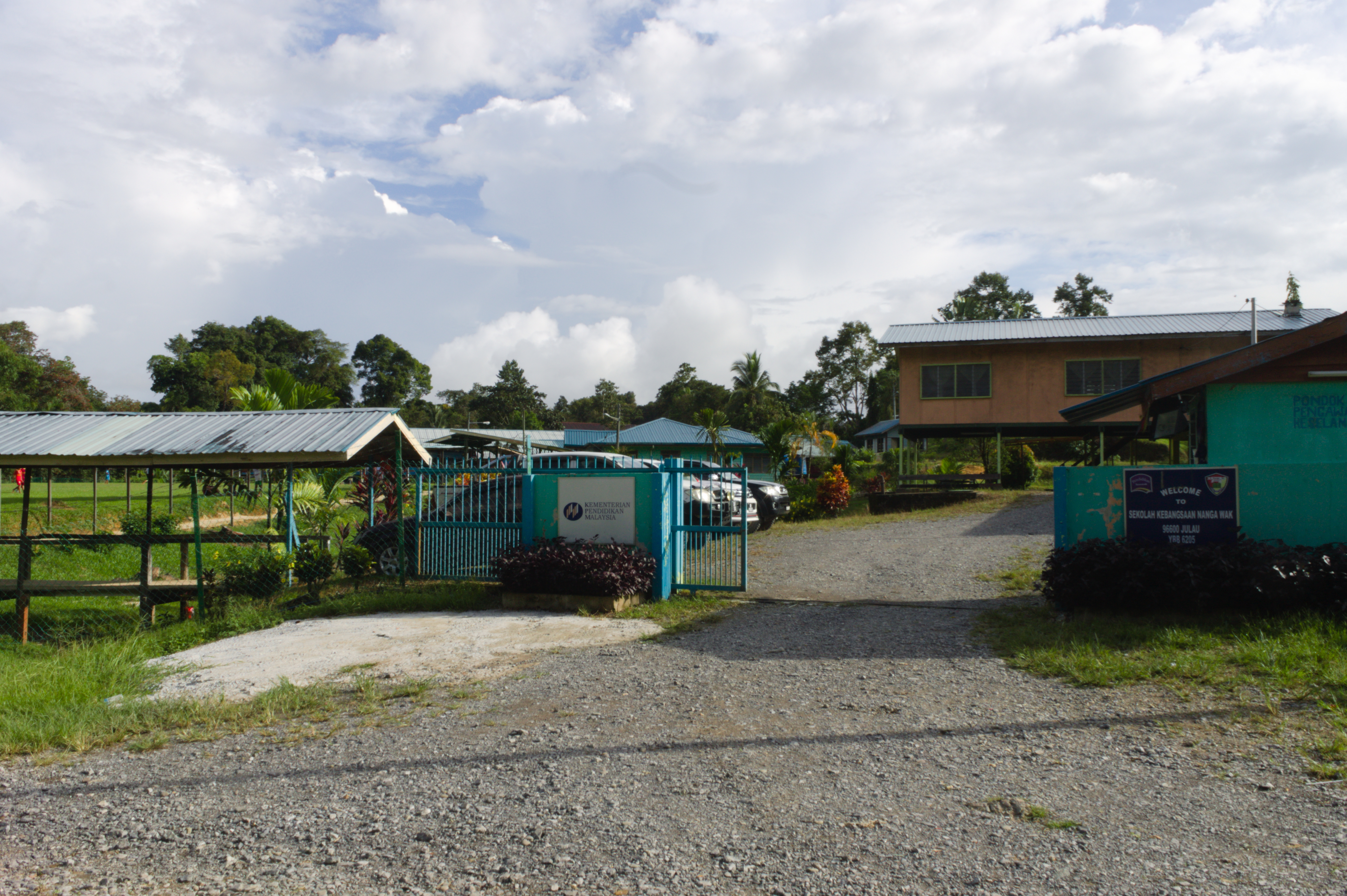
The Nanga Wak primary school

There is an earth road connecting Nanga Wak to Ulu Julau. As of 2016, there is a lack of water and electricity supply in the area.

=== Nanga Kara ===
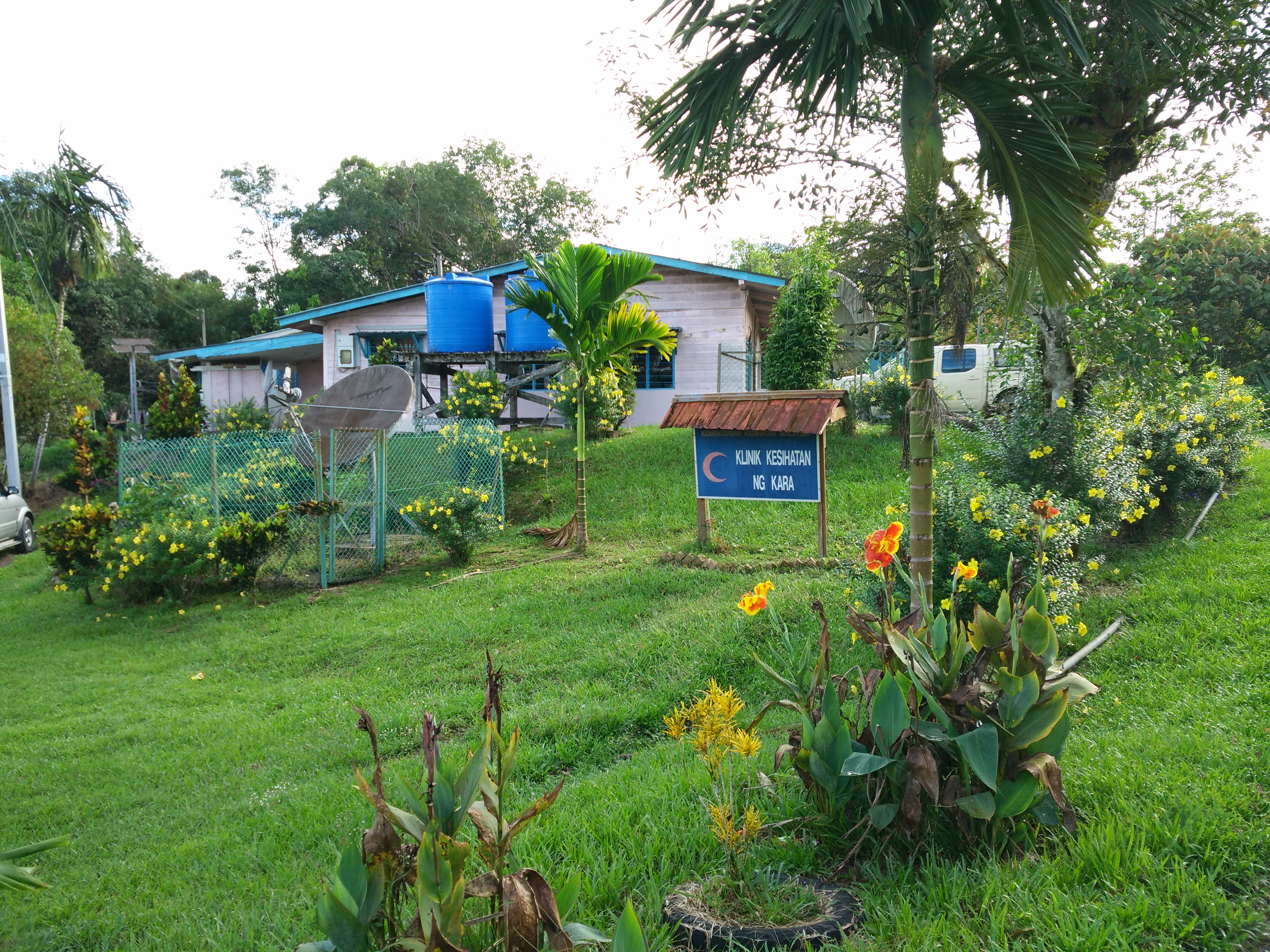
Nanga Kara medical clinic

There is a primary school in this area.

=== Ulu Entabai ===
The place is located at three-hour drive from the town of Pakan. Nanga Kemalih public health clinic and SK Ulu Entabai (primary school) are located here. A development project consisted of a new clinic, administrative block, and staff quarters opposite SK Ulu Entabai was commenced in 2017. The project began construction in 2019 and reached 70% progress by March 2021.
