= Sarawak Land Development Board =

Sarawak Land Development Board (SLDB) was a Malaysian body corporate active in palm oil industry and other industries founded in 1972.

Sarawak Plantation Berhad (SPB; MYX: 5135) was specially incorporated as the vehicle company for the privatisation of Sarawak Land Development Board's (SLDB) assets. It has developed extensive areas for oil palm and cocoa.

== History ==
In its early days, it took over the management of rubber schemes. By 1980, it had established 15,294 ha of oil palm and cocoa, including 11,772 ha on unencumbered state land and 3,522 on what was formerly native customary land. In 1981, it withdrew from almost all rubber schemes, partly due to financial difficulties. In the 1980s, large-scale palm agriculture was introduced to Bekenu by SLDB. At that time, the people, who protested against their customary land being mapped as state land, were arrested. In 1987, its management was contracted to Sime Darby, a commercial plantation company. At that point, it suffered serious losses. By 2000, SLDB held 35,300 ha of land in Northern Sarawak, 50% under oil palm plantations and 49% of undeveloped forest land. It dealt with the resettlement of natives.
