= Belawai =

Sarawak constituency

Defunct state constituency
- Legislature: Sarawak State Legislative Assembly
- Constituency created: 1987
- Constituency abolished: 2016
- First contested: 1991
- Last contested: 2011

Belawai was a state constituency in Sarawak, Malaysia, that was represented in the Sarawak State Legislative Assembly from 1991 to 2016.

The state constituency was created in the 1987 redistribution and was mandated to return a single member to the Sarawak State Legislative Assembly under the first past the post voting system.

== History ==
It was abolished in 2016 after it was redistributed.

2006–2016: The constituency contains the polling districts of Belawai, Rajang, Selalang, Sari, Seberang.

=== Representation history ===
Members of the Legislative Assembly for Belawai
Assembly	No	Years	Member	Party
Constituency created
13th	N28	1991-1996	Hamden Ahmad	BN (PBB)
14th	N30	1996–1997	Hamden Ahmad	BN (PBB)
15th	N30	2001–2006	Hamden Ahmad	BN (PBB)
16th	N35	2006–2011	Hamden Ahmad	BN (PBB)
17th	N35	2011-2016	Len Salleh	BN (PBB)
Constituency abolished, renamed to Kuala Rajang

== Election results ==
Sarawak state election, 2011: Belawai
Party	Candidate	Votes	%	∆%
BN	Len Salleh	5,164	87.30	▲3.38
PKR	Abdul Wahab Abdullah	618	10.45	▼5.63
Independent	Kiprawi Suhaili	133	2.25	▲2.25
Total valid votes		5,915	100.00	
Total rejected ballots		91		
Unreturned ballots		43		
Turnout		6,049	70.15	▲7.87
Registered electors		8,623		
Majority		4,546	76.86	▲9.02
BN hold		Swing		{{{2}}}
Source(s) "Federal Government Gazette - Results of Contested Election and Statements of the Poll after the Official Addition of Votes Sarawak [P.U. (B) 245/2011]" (PDF). Attorney General's Chambers of Malaysia. 29 April 2011.

Sarawak state election, 2006: Belawai
Party	Candidate	Votes	%	∆%
BN	Hamden Ahmad	4,102	83.92	▲25.40
PKR	Abang Sarbini Abang Ojek	786	16.08	▲16.08
Total valid votes		4,888	100.00	
Total rejected ballots		97		
Unreturned ballots		0		
Turnout		4,985	62.28	▼3.61
Registered electors		8,004		
Majority		3,316	67.84	▲44.94
BN hold		Swing		{{{2}}}

Sarawak state election, 2001: Belawai
Party	Candidate	Votes	%	∆%
BN	Hamden Ahmad	3,509	58.52	
Independent	Sharifah Hajijah Syed Jamil	2,136	35.62	
Independent	Osman Ossen	351	5.85	
Total valid votes		5,996	100.00	
Total rejected ballots		92		
Unreturned ballots		3		
Turnout		6,091	65.89	
Registered electors		9,244		
Majority		1,373	22.90	
BN hold		Swing		{{{2}}}

Sarawak state election, 1996: Belawai
Party	Candidate	Votes	%	∆%
On the nomination day, Hamden Ahmad won uncontested.
BN	Hamden Ahmad			
Total valid votes			100.00	
Total rejected ballots				
Unreturned ballots				
Turnout				
Registered electors		9,172		
Majority				
BN hold		Swing		{{{2}}}

Sarawak state election, 1991: Belawai
Party	Candidate	Votes	%
BN	Hamden Ahmad	3,151	52.93
PERMAS	Salleh Jafaruddin	2,802	47.07
Total valid votes		5,953	100.00
Total rejected ballots		66	
Unreturned ballots		5	
Turnout		6,024	77.45
Registered electors		7,778	
Majority		349	5.86
This was a new constituency created.
