= Kuching Civic Centre =

Building in Kuching, Sarawak, Malaysia

Kuching Civic Centre Dewan Suarah Kuching
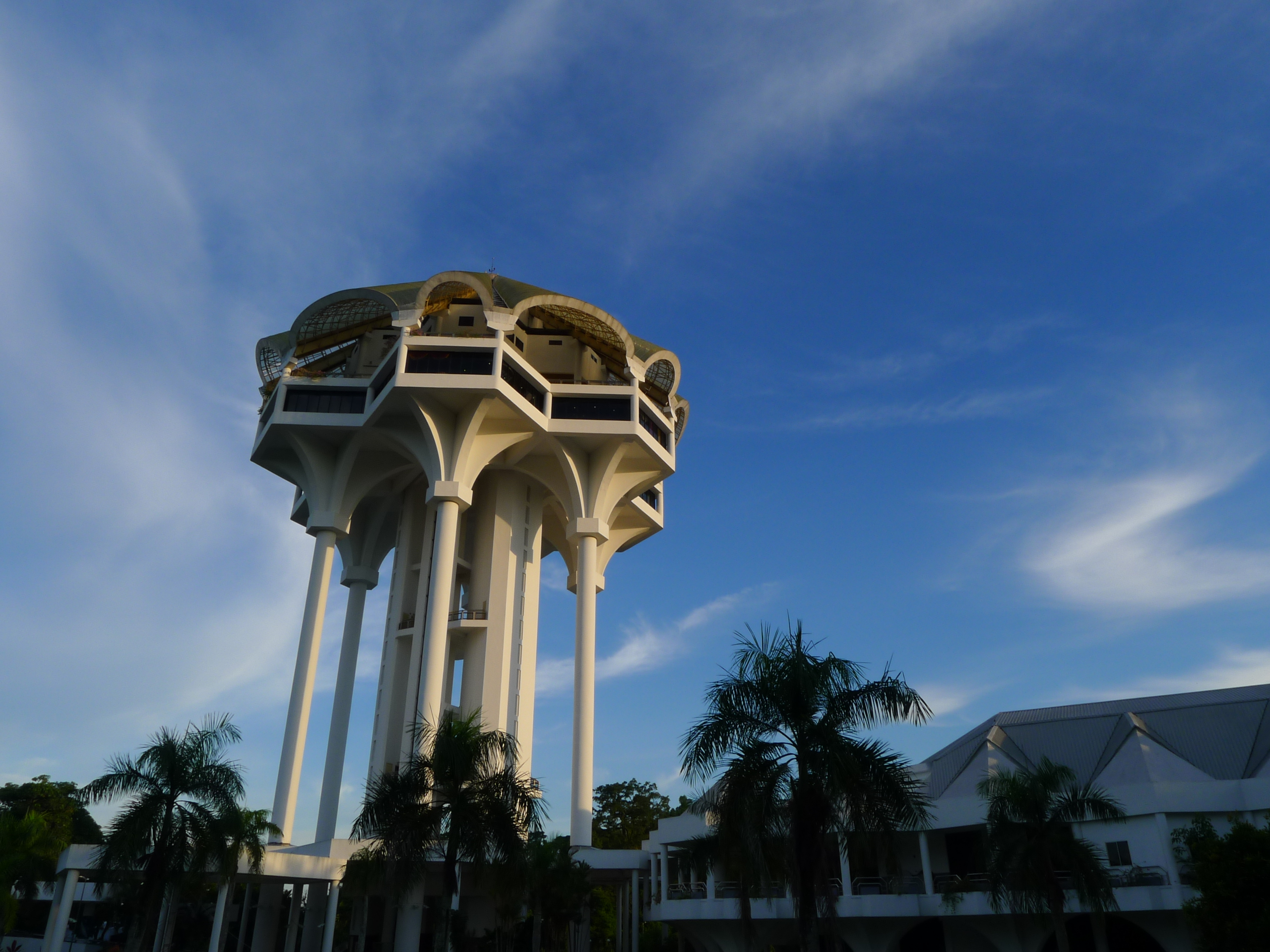
- Interactive map of the Kuching Civic Centre; Dewan Suarah Kuching area

General information
- Status: Completed
- Type: Civic centre and planetarium
- Location: Kuching, Sarawak, Malaysia
- Coordinates: 1°32′50.5″N 110°20′39.4″E
- Opening: 1 August 1988
- Owner: Sarawak state government

The Kuching Civic Centre (Malay: Dewan Suarah Kuching) is a major landmark in Kuching, Sarawak, Malaysia. The building was officially opened on 1 August 1988 by former chief minister Tun Pehin Sri Abdul Taib Mahmud.

== Features ==
The viewing platform at the top of the futuristic Civic Centre tower offers the best all-round views of Kuching and the surrounding areas. The city and its hinterland, Mount Serapi, Mount Santubong and even the mountains of Kalimantan are visible on a clear day.
