= Julau District =

Julau
- District
- Flag Seal
- Interactive map of Julau
- Country: Malaysia
- State: Sarawak
- Division: Sarikei Division

Map of Julau District

Julau is a district, in Sarikei Division, Sarawak, Malaysia.

== Town and villages ==
=== Julau ===
Julau District Office is located in the town.

=== Nanga Entabai ===
A primary school named "SK Nanga Entabai" is located here.

=== Nanga Lasi ===
Construction of a steel bridge across the Julau river started in November 2021.

=== Nanga Maong ===
Nanga Maong public health clinic is located here.
