= Sarawak Biodiversity Centre =

State biology research institute, Sarawak, Malaysia

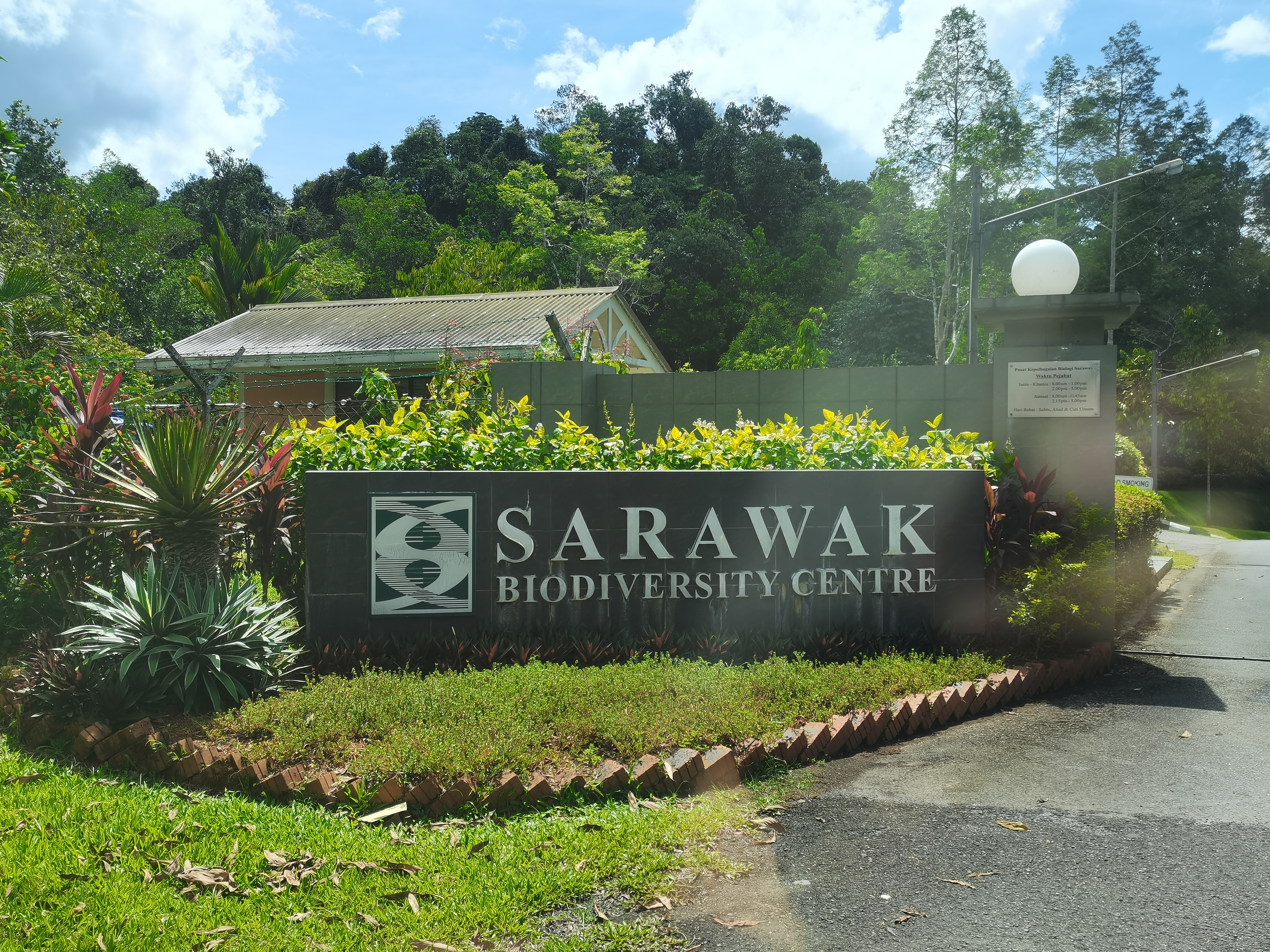
- Entrance into Sarawak Biodiversity Centre
- Established: 1997
- Mission: To Decode Biodiversity for the Benefit of Sarawak
- Focus: Traditional knowledge documentation Bioprospecting; Bioinformatics
- Chair: Jaul Samion
- Chief Executive Officer: Yeo Tiong Chia
- Owner: Sarawak state government
- Location: KM 20, Jalan Puncak Borneo, Kuching, Sarawak, Malaysia
- Coordinates: 1°23′33″N 110°19′23″E
- Interactive map of Sarawak Biodiversity Centre
- Website: https://www.sbc.org.my/

Sarawak Biodiversity Centre (SBC) is a statutory body that was set up by the government of Sarawak in 1997 for the regulation of access and collection of biological resources for research or commercial purposes. In 2004, the centre was relieved of its regulatory role and started to get involved in biotechnology-based research on the biological resources in the state.

== History ==
Sarawak Biodiversity Centre was established in 1997 following the enactment of the Sarawak Biodiversity Centre Ordinance by the Sarawak state government for conservation, utilization, protection and sustainable development of biodiversity in the state. This was followed by the enactment of Sarawak Biodiversity Regulations in 1998. In December 2003, the Sarawak State Legislative Assembly passed the Sarawak Biodiversity Centre (Amendment) Ordinance 2003. The state assembly also revised the Sarawak Biodiversity Regulations in 2004. Following these revisions, Sarawak Biodiversity Centre was relieved of its previous role and assumed a new role of research and development of the state biological resources and documentation of indigenous knowledge of utilising biological resources. In 2017, SBC hosted BioBorneo and Bioeconomy Day.

SBC collaborated with Mitsubishi Corporation on cultivating indigenous algae since 2012. In 2019, SBC and Mitsubishi launched one of the largest algae cultivation facility in Southeast Asia. It is expected to produce 60 tonnes of dried algae biomass per hectare per year.

== Programmes ==
=== Traditional Knowledge Documentation Programme ===
This programme exists to prevent the loss of traditional knowledge in indigenous communities because knowledge is passed to the next generations only through oral tradition. This programme is carried out through capacity-building workshops where local communities are trained with documentation techniques as well as growing and management of useful indigenous plants. As of 9 November 2020, a total of 6,420 plants were documented with 1,713 species of plants identified.

=== Research and Development (Bioprospecting) Programme ===
This programme is supported by seven laboratories with the aim to screen for anti-cancer, anti-fungal, anti-bacterial, anti-inflammatory and anti-protease compounds from its natural products library. This programme also isolates and sequences genes from useful microbes that have medicinal and industrial applications. This programme is also developing plant tissue culture capabilities for mass propagations and genetic transformation of plants.

=== Bioinformatics Programme ===
This programme aims to provide an integrated database storage and maintenance system on biological resources in the state and traditional knowledge on growing indigenous plants.

=== Biodiversity Garden Programme ===
This programme collects, propagates and plants the indigenous flora of Sarawak that are used by the indigenous communities in the state. This garden provides raw plant materials for research and development. This garden is also open for public education and tours.

=== Awareness and Appreciation Programme ===
Through seminars, workshops, conferences, forums, public lectures, dialogue sessions, and exhibitions, this programme aims to disseminate accurate information on biodiversity and biotechnology to the general public, policymakers, government officials, members of academia, researchers, industry representatives and the media.

== Facilities ==
=== Extraction laboratory ===
At the plant preparation area, all plants will undergo washing, sorting, cutting, drying, and grinding to become ground plant samples. The samples are then extracted by using maceration solvent extraction, maceration aqueous extraction, liquid-liquid partition, and reflux extraction. The plant extracts are then deposited into the natural products library.

=== Microbiology laboratory ===
This laboratory isolates actinomycetes and fungi from plants and soil to be stored in natural products library for their antimicrobial activity testing

=== Molecular biology laboratory ===
This laboratory aims to screen for anti-cancer and anti-inflammatory compounds from plants, actinomycetes, and fungi using molecular genetics and in vitro cell lines screening.

=== Plant tissue culture laboratory ===
This laboratory aims to cultivate targeted plants on a massive scale for research and development and domestication.

=== Analytical chemistry laboratory ===
Extracts obtained from the extraction laboratory and microbiology laboratory are sent here for isolation and purification using various chromatographic techniques.

=== Bioinformatics data centre ===
It features biological resources databases, a natural product library, and traditional knowledge databases.

=== Product development laboratory ===
This laboratory focus on extraction of essential oils and indigenous oils, formulation of personal care products, and quality analyses of the developed products.

== Research and patents ==
In 2002, the centre filed a patent for two cyclopentabenzofuran compounds similar to silvestrol extracted from Aglaia species that had shown anti-cancer activities in THP-1 cell line and A549 cell lines. This is followed by the screening of more Aglaia samples which led to compounds that are active against MCF-7 cell line and NCI-60 cell line in 2008.

In 2006, the centre started a project called "Development of Medicinal and Aromatic Oils from Sarawak's Indigenous Plants". From indigenous traditional knowledge documentation programme, Litsea cubeba tree found at Bario, Lawas, and Padawan municipality was used for essential oil extraction with the support from Global Environment Facility (GEF) grant and United Nations Development Programme (UNDP). The essential oil has a crisp and citrus lemony scent. Essential oil from the plant not only shows anti-microbial and anti-inflammatory properties, it is also able to repel insects. In 2011, the Sarawak Litsea tree was registered under geographical indication while the essential oil extract was registered under the trademark Litsara. In 2017, Sarawak Biodiversity Centre cooperate with Interhill Group to sell Litsara products in Pullman hotels at Kuching and Miri. Over time, a range of products such as freshener, soap, shampoo, and handwash are produced from the essential oil extract.

In 2007, Adenosma nelsonioides (known as Bunga Ta'ang by the Bidayuh community) was documented by Sarawak Biodiversity Centre at Padawan area. In 2014, Adenosma essential oil volatile vapour was found to have antifungal activity against Ganoderma boninense, a fungus that is harmful to oil palms. Its essential oil has a woody and herbal scent which is described by perfumers as "spicy". The oil also has anti-bacterial and anti-fungal properties. In 2015, the plant was filed for geographical indication as Sarawak Adenosma and the essential oil derived from it was trademarked as Adenosara. In October 2020, benefit sharing agreement was signed between Sarawak Biodiversity Centre and local Bidayuh and Iban communities.

In 2016, the centre was involved in research regarding the role of laccase enzymes in cotton plant fibre development.
