= Kuala Rajang (state constituency) =

State constituency in Sarawak, Malaysia

Kuala Rajang (N41)
Sarawak constituency

State constituency
- Legislature: Sarawak State Legislative Assembly
MLA
Vacant
- Constituency created: 1968
- Constituency abolished: 1991
- Constituency re-created: 2015
- First contested: 1969
- Last contested: 2026

Demographics
- Population (2020): 18,733
- Electors (2021): 11,428

Kuala Rajang is a state constituency in Sarawak, Malaysia, that has been represented in the Sarawak State Legislative Assembly from 1969 to 1991, from 2016 to present.

The state constituency was created in the 1968 redistribution and is mandated to return a single member to the Sarawak State Legislative Assembly under the first past the post voting system.

== Demographics ==
Ethnic breakdown of Kuala Rajang's electorate as of 2022
1. Malay-Muslim bumiputera (63.8%)
2. Sarawak bumiputera (27.3%)
3. Chinese (8.00%)
4. Other ethnicities (0.90%)

== History ==
It was abolished in 1991 after it was redistributed. It was re-created in 2015.

As of 2020, Kuala Rajang has a population of 18,733 people.

=== Polling districts ===
According to the gazette issued on 31 October 2022, the Kuala Rajang constituency has a total of 6 polling districts.

State constituency	Polling Districts	Code	Location
Kuala Rajang（N41）	Selalang	206/41/01	SK Mandor Aris Kpg. Selalang
Kuala Rajang（N41）	Belawai	206/41/02	SK Stalun; SK Abang Gesa
Kuala Rajang（N41）	Rajang	206/41/03	SK Bayang; SK Abang Galau; SK Abang Buyuk Kpg. Jerijeh
Kuala Rajang（N41）	Sari	206/41/04	SK Jawa Kerubong Jln. Selalang; SK Adin Sare; SK Bukit Kinyau; SK Sentebu; SK St. Andrew Sare
Kuala Rajang（N41）	Seberang	206/41/05	SK Muara Payang Sarikei; SK Abang Haji Matahir Sarikei; SRA Kpg. Baru Seberang Sarikei
Kuala Rajang（N41）	Nanga Lepa	206/41/06	RH Gabriel Ng Lepa

=== Representation history ===
Members of the Legislative Assembly for Kuala Rajang
Assembly	No	Years	Member	Party
Constituency created
8th	N23	1970-1973	Abdul Rahman Ya'kub	BUMIPUTERA
8th	N23	1973-1974	Abdul Rahman Ya'kub	BN (PBB)
9th	N23	1974-1979	Abdul Rahman Ya'kub	BN (PBB)
10th	N23	1979-1983	Mohamad Asfia Awang Nassar	BN (PBB)
11th	N23	1983-1987	Saidi Olia	BN (PBB)
12th	N23	1987-1991	Hamden Ahmad	BN (PBB)
Constituency abolished, renamed to Belawai
Constituency re-created, recreated from Belawai and Kalaka
18th	N41	2016-2018	Len Salleh	BN (PBB)
18th	N41	2018-2021	Len Salleh	GPS (PBB)
19th	N41	2021–2026	Len Salleh	GPS (PBB)

== Election results ==
Sarawak state election, 2026
Party	Candidate	Votes	%	∆%
GPS				▲
PH				▲
Total valid votes				
Total rejected ballots				
Unreturned ballots				
Turnout				
Registered electors				
Majority				

Sarawak state election, 2021
Party	Candidate	Votes	%	∆%
GPS	Len Salleh	5,268	70.35	▲70.35
Independent	Abang Aditajaya Abang Alwi	1,943	25.95	▲25.95
Independent	Abdul Mutalip Abdullah	168	2.24	▲0.07
PBK	Wong Ling Ching	109	1.46	▲1.46
Total valid votes		7,488	100.00	
Total rejected ballots		122		
Unreturned ballots		52		
Turnout		7,662	67.05	▼3.40
Registered electors		11,428		
Majority		3,325	44.40	▼34.99
GPS gain from BN		Swing		?
Source(s) https://lom.agc.gov.my/ilims/upload/portal/akta/outputp/1718688/PUB687.pdf

Sarawak state election, 2016
Party	Candidate	Votes	%	∆%
BN	Len Salleh	6,235	88.60	▲88.60
Amanah	Sopian Julaihi	649	9.22	▲9.22
Independent	Asbor Abdullah	153	2.17	▲2.17
Total valid votes		7,037	100.00	
Total rejected ballots		153		
Unreturned ballots		37		
Turnout		7,227	70.45	
Registered electors		10,259		
Majority		5,586	79.38	
BN hold		Swing		
Source(s) "Federal Government Gazette - Notice of Contested Election, State Legislative Assembly of the State of Sarawak [P.U. (B) 190/2016]" (PDF). Attorney General's Chambers of Malaysia. 25 April 2016. Archived from the original (PDF) on 2017-06-12. "Senarai Calon yang Disahkan Layak Bertanding Pilihan Raya Dewan Undangan Negeri ke-11". Election Commission of Malaysia. 25 April 2016. Archived from the original on 25 April 2016.

Sarawak state election, 1987
Party	Candidate	Votes	%	∆%
BN	Hamden Ahmad	3,251	60.64	▼3.47
PERMAS	Saadi Olia	2,110	39.36	▲39.36
Total valid votes		5,361	100.00	
Total rejected ballots		64		
Unreturned ballots		0		
Turnout		5,425	78.83	
Registered electors		6,882		
Majority		1,141	21.28	▼6.94
BN hold		Swing		

Sarawak state election, 1983
Party	Candidate	Votes	%	∆%
BN	Saidi Olia	3,305	64.11	▼12.18
Independent	Udie Salleh	1,850	35.89	▲35.89
Total valid votes		5,155	100.00	
Total rejected ballots		59		
Unreturned ballots		0		
Turnout		5,214	79.45	
Registered electors		6,563		
Majority		1,455	28.22	▼36.74
BN hold		Swing		

Sarawak state election, 1979
Party	Candidate	Votes	%	∆%
BN	Mohamad Asfia Awang Nasar	3,716	76.29	▼1.80
Independent	Joseph Allen Entai	552	11.33	▲11.33
Parti Anak Jati Sarawak	Abdullah Galau	532	10.92	▲10.92
Independent	Bohari Ujang	71	1.46	▲1.46
Total valid votes		4,871	100.00	
Total rejected ballots		66		
Unreturned ballots		0		
Turnout		4,937	82.24	▼0.93
Registered electors		6,003		
Majority		3,164	64.96	▲8.79
BN hold		Swing		

Sarawak state election, 1974
Party	Candidate	Votes	%	∆%
BN	Abdul Rahman Ya'kub	3,667	78.09	▲33.67
SNAP	Sylvester Melling Kium	1,029	21.91	▲6.64
Total valid votes		4,696	100.00	
Total rejected ballots		358		
Unreturned ballots		0		
Turnout		5,054	83.17	▼5.58
Registered electors		6,077		
Majority		2,638	56.17	▲28.83
BN gain from PBB		Swing		?

Sarawak state election, 1969
Party	Candidate	Votes	%
PBB	Abdul Rahman Ya'kub	2,161	44.42
SUPP	Drahman Karia	831	17.08
SNAP	Ainie Dhoby	743	15.27
Independent	Then Kwan Long	656	13.48
PESAKA	Biliang Tinggi	371	7.63
Independent	Majidi Suhaili	103	2.12
Total valid votes		4,865	100.00
Total rejected ballots		222	
Unreturned ballots		0	
Turnout		5,087	88.75
Registered electors		5,732	
Majority		1,330	27.34
This was a new constituency created.
