= Pakan, Sarawak =

Pakan
- Town and district capital

Other transcription(s)
  - Chinese: 巴干
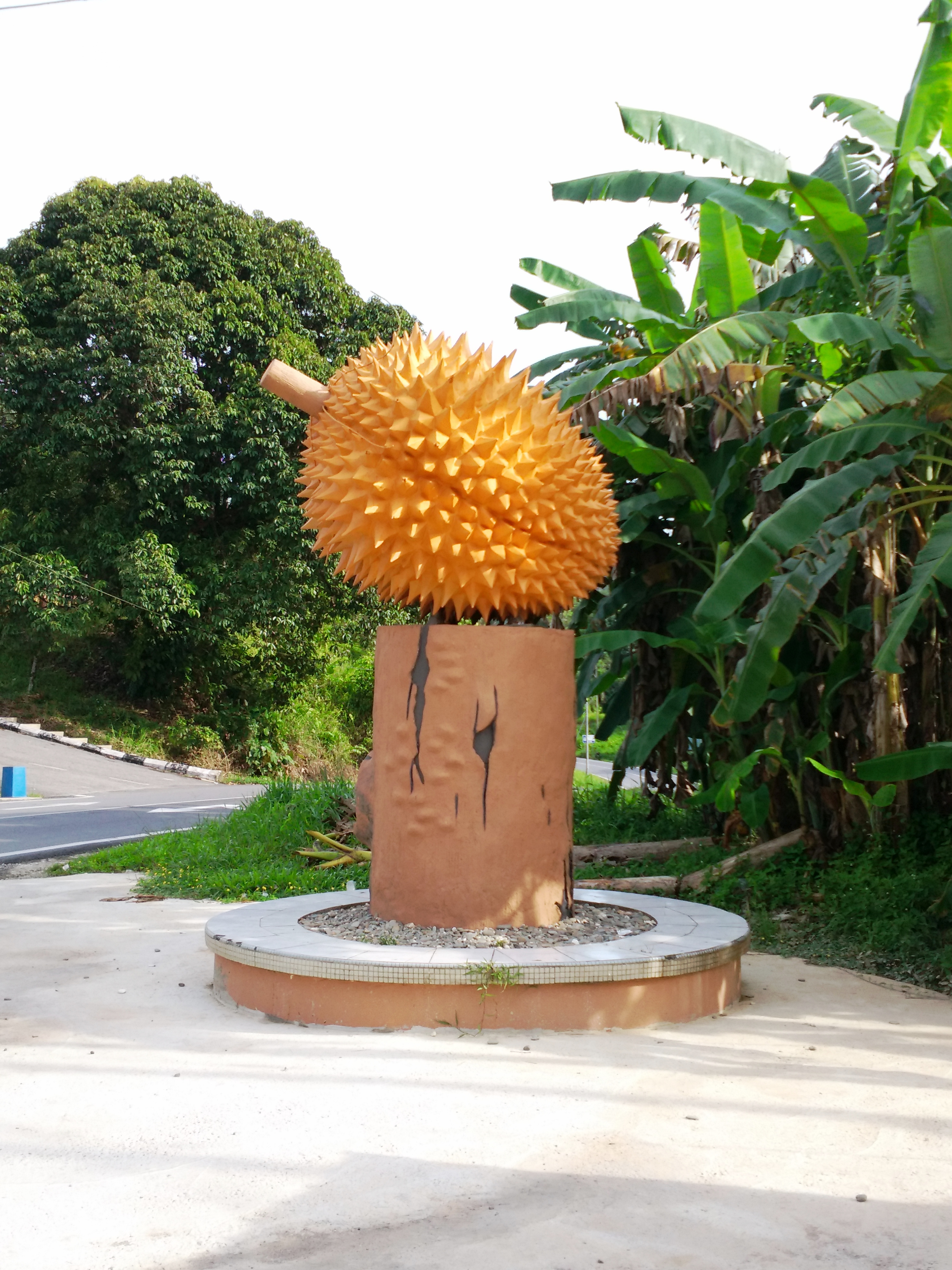
- Replica of Buah Pakan at Pakan town

- Location in Borneo
- Coordinates: 1°52′00″N 111°41′00″E
- Country: Malaysia
- State: Sarawak
- Division: Sarikei
- District: Pakan

Government
  - District Officer: En. Seroji Bin Ludin (2017-Now)

Area
  - Total: 924.6 km^{2} (357.0 sq mi)

Population (2020)
  - Total: 15,462
  - Density: 16/km^{2} (41/sq mi)
- Time zone: UTC+08:00 (MST)
- Postal code: 96xxx
- Website: www.sarikei.sarawak.gov.my

Pakan is a small town in Pakan District, Sarikei Division, Sarawak, Malaysia. The district population estimates (as of the 2017 census) was 17,600.

Most of its inhabitants are ethnic Iban people (95%+) and a few minority Chinese usually concentrated in its town area. A small minority of Malay work in a government sector, such as teachers, nurses, district officers, and police.

== Etymology ==
The name Pakan was derived from a local fruit resembling durian, named Buah Pakan. It has yellowish skin and flesh. (Note: Yii, 2010. Page 285) The fruit has since become the symbol of the town with its replica built at the junction of Entabai road.

== History ==
In 1911, a man from Guangdong named Wen Ru Zhu (翁如珠) was the first Chinese to arrive in Sarikei. Four years later in 1915, he together with one of his family member, brought some daily necessities, climbed through the mountains and arrive in Pakan to trade with the Iban people living there for agricultural products. Apart from Iban longhouses and rubber plantations, there were no Chinese houses there. The Iban people welcomed the arrival of Wen as he brought the much needed daily necessities to them. The journey to and from Pakan took about ten days. Wen would build a small hut in Pakan to stay there for some days before going back to Sarikei. Later, he married an Iban woman in Pakan and started a family. Later, more Chinese came here to build shophouses and to trade with Iban people. (Note: Yii, 2010. Page 285)

In 1937, Penghulu Asun staged a rebellion against the Brooke government in Pakan. In 1957, Min Jin primary school (民进小学) was built. In 1968, there was a flood in Pakan. (Note: Yii, 2010. Page 287)

== Government ==
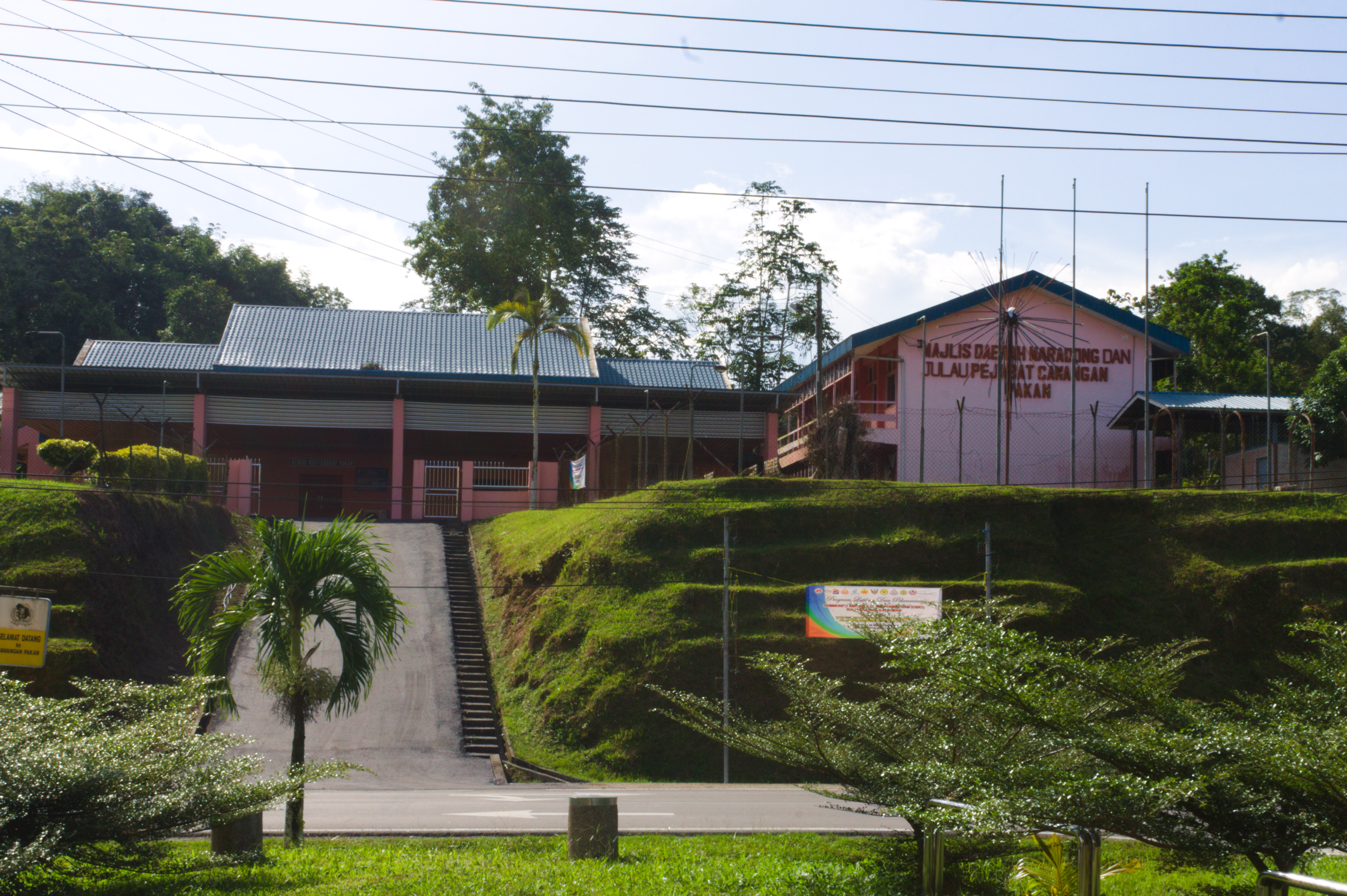
Meradong and Julau District Council, Pakan branch

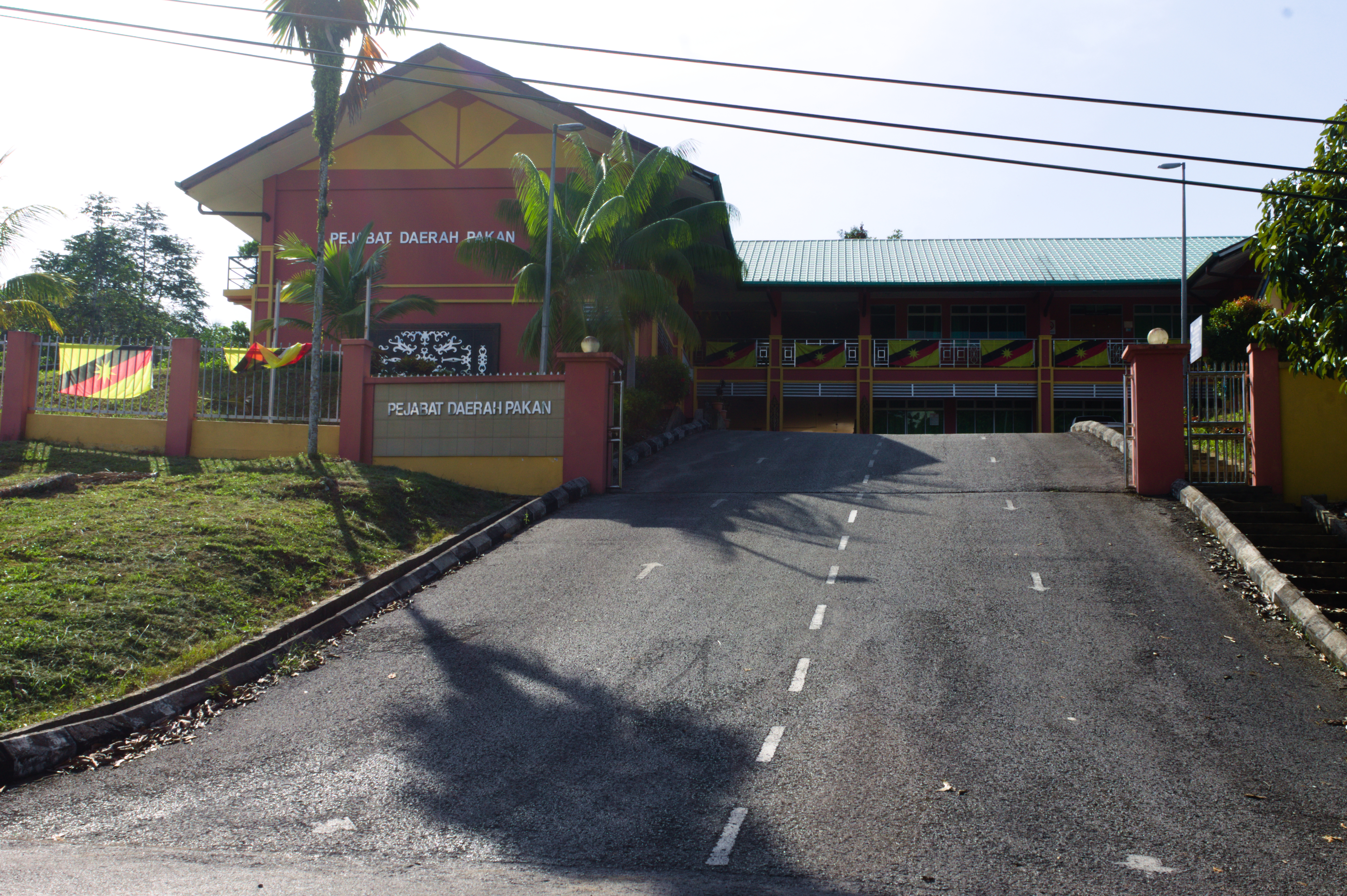
The Pakan District Office.

Since creation of the Sarikei Division in 1973, the Pakan sub-district was put under the jurisdiction of Julau district. On 1 March 2002, the Pakan sub-district was upgraded into a district. The Pakan District covers a total area of 924.6 km^{2} (357.0 sq mi), administered by Pakan District Office located in the town of Pakan.

== Geography ==
Pakan is located 45 km (28 mi) from the town of Sarikei.

=== Longhouses ===
- Tr. Rawing, Ulu Marau
- Tr. Empati anak idai, Nanga Marau
- Tr. Saban Sungai Ipoh, Pakan
- Tr. Undi, Sg Pantak (once niang Tr Taling)
- Tr. Sedau Ak Empali
- Tr. Nyambar, Ulu Kota, Pakan
- Tr. Bujang
- Tr. Minang
- Tr. Panau
- Rumah Jilap Bt6 Jalan Entabai Pakan
- Tr. Matu Anak Dingun Bt3 Pakan
- Tr. Matthew Nawong, Lubuk Pisang, Sg Genega
- Tr. Tukang, Nyalak Atas
- Tr. James Anak Jantan, Darau.
- Tr. Andrew Ungon, Darau
- Tr. George anak Chungut, Nanga Nansang
- Tr. Ganda anak Saba, Manding, Sungai Lemujan
- Tr. Attan anak Ana, Lubok Ubi, Sugai
- Tr. Linggang anak Kaya, Merampu
- Tr. Liman anak Lawo, Munggu Temedak
- Tr. Kalong anak Asa
- Tr. Janang anak Silang, Sg.Wong, Wak
- Tr. Barang Sg Empang, Pakan
- Tr. Empi Tanjung, Pakan
- Tr. Ladi Nasau, Pakan
- Tr. Empek Nasau, Pakan
- Tr. Imban, Genting Kopi Pakan
- Tr. Jantan, Genting, Kopi Pakan
- Tr. Safri, Tubai Buah, Pakan
- Tr. Nyalong Nanga Segera, Pakan
- Tr. Gandai, Tubai Buah, Pakan
- Tr. Budom, Tubai Buah, Pakan
- Tr. Menari, Ng Pedanum
- Tr. Ragai Sungai Jaong, Pakan
- Tr. Japar Ulu Kemalih, Entabai
- Tr. Dinggai Amut Atas, Pakan
- Tr. Gunda @ Chakau, Sg.Seru, Lemujan

== Climate ==
Pakan has a tropical rainforest climate (Af) with heavy to very heavy rainfall year-round.

Climate data for Pakan
Month	Jan	Feb	Mar	Apr	May	Jun	Jul	Aug	Sep	Oct	Nov	Dec	Year
Mean daily maximum °C (°F)	30.0 (86.0)	30.2 (86.4)	31.2 (88.2)	31.9 (89.4)	32.2 (90.0)	32.0 (89.6)	32.0 (89.6)	31.6 (88.9)	31.6 (88.9)	31.5 (88.7)	31.3 (88.3)	30.7 (87.3)	31.4 (88.4)
Daily mean °C (°F)	26.0 (78.8)	26.1 (79.0)	26.8 (80.2)	27.2 (81.0)	27.4 (81.3)	27.1 (80.8)	27.0 (80.6)	26.7 (80.1)	26.9 (80.4)	26.9 (80.4)	26.8 (80.2)	26.4 (79.5)	26.8 (80.2)
Mean daily minimum °C (°F)	22.1 (71.8)	22.1 (71.8)	22.4 (72.3)	22.5 (72.5)	22.7 (72.9)	22.3 (72.1)	22.0 (71.6)	21.9 (71.4)	22.2 (72.0)	22.3 (72.1)	22.3 (72.1)	22.1 (71.8)	22.2 (72.0)
Average rainfall mm (inches)	336 (13.2)	272 (10.7)	291 (11.5)	257 (10.1)	250 (9.8)	181 (7.1)	174 (6.9)	237 (9.3)	280 (11.0)	276 (10.9)	286 (11.3)	364 (14.3)	3,204 (126.1)
Source: Climate-Data.org

== Demographics ==
=== Ethnicity ===
Pakan District Ethnic Statistic
Total Population	Malay	Iban	Bidayuh	Melanau	Other Bumiputera	Chinese	Indian	Other Non-Bumiputera	Non-Citizen
15,139	125	14,423	26	39	136	289	13	35	53

Ethnic composition in Pakan
Ethnic group	Percent
Iban	95.3%
Chinese	1.9%
Other Bumiputera	0.9%
Malay	0.8%
Non-Citizen	0.4%
Melanau	0.3%
Indian	0.1%

In 2010, Pakan town had a total population of 14,570, where there were 14,023 Iban people, 402 Chinese, 80 Malays, and 65 from other ethnic groups. (Note: Yii, 2010. Page 285)

=== Places of worship ===
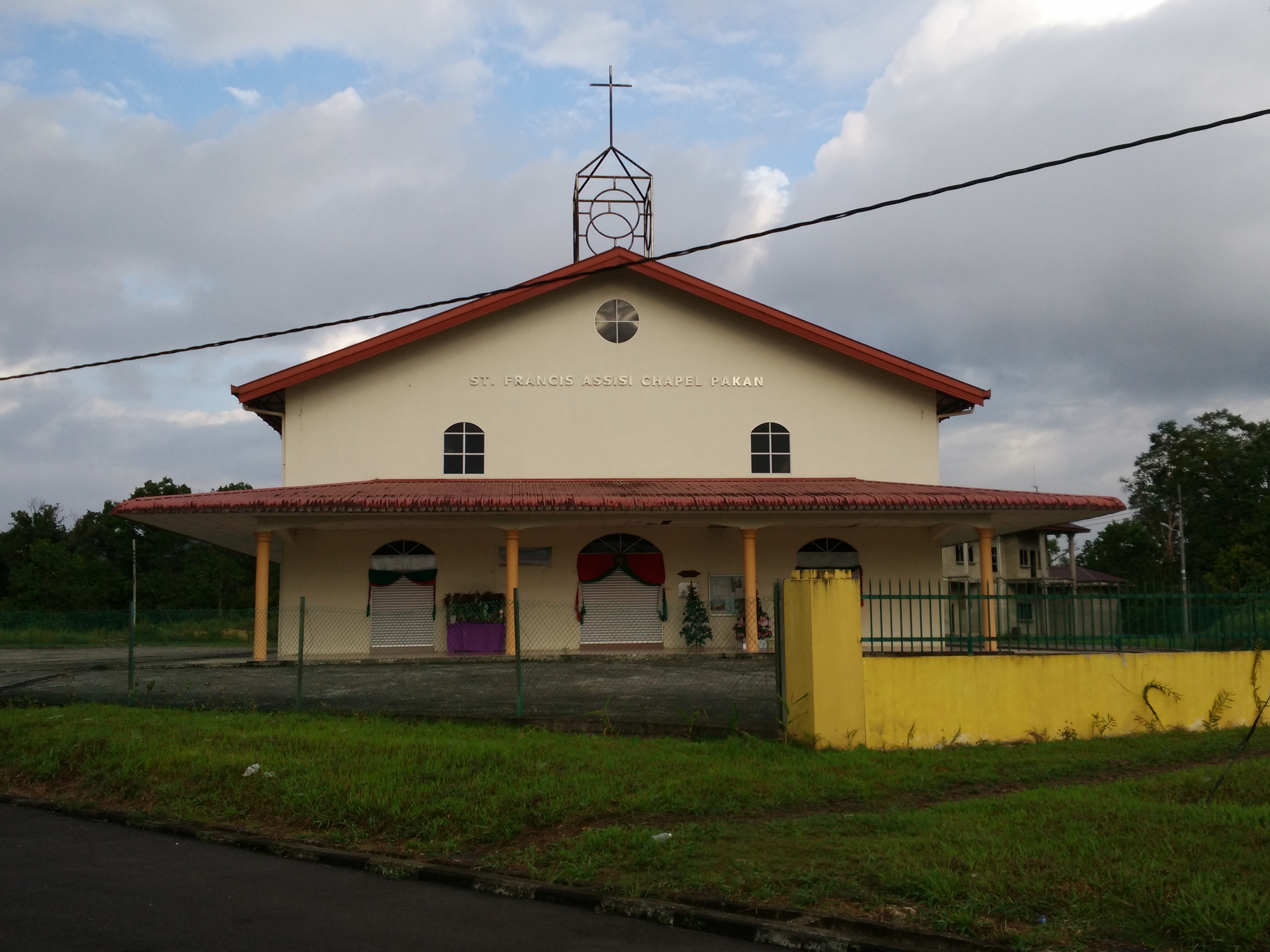
St Francis Asisi Chapel.

- St. Francis Assisi Church
- BEM (SIB) Nanga Pakan
- Chapel St Joseph, Ulu Kota
- Mosque (beside Klinik Pakan)
- Surau Zulkarnain, Rumah Julin, Kg Amut (sponsored by Yayasan Amal Malaysia Cawangan Sarawak)

== Economy ==
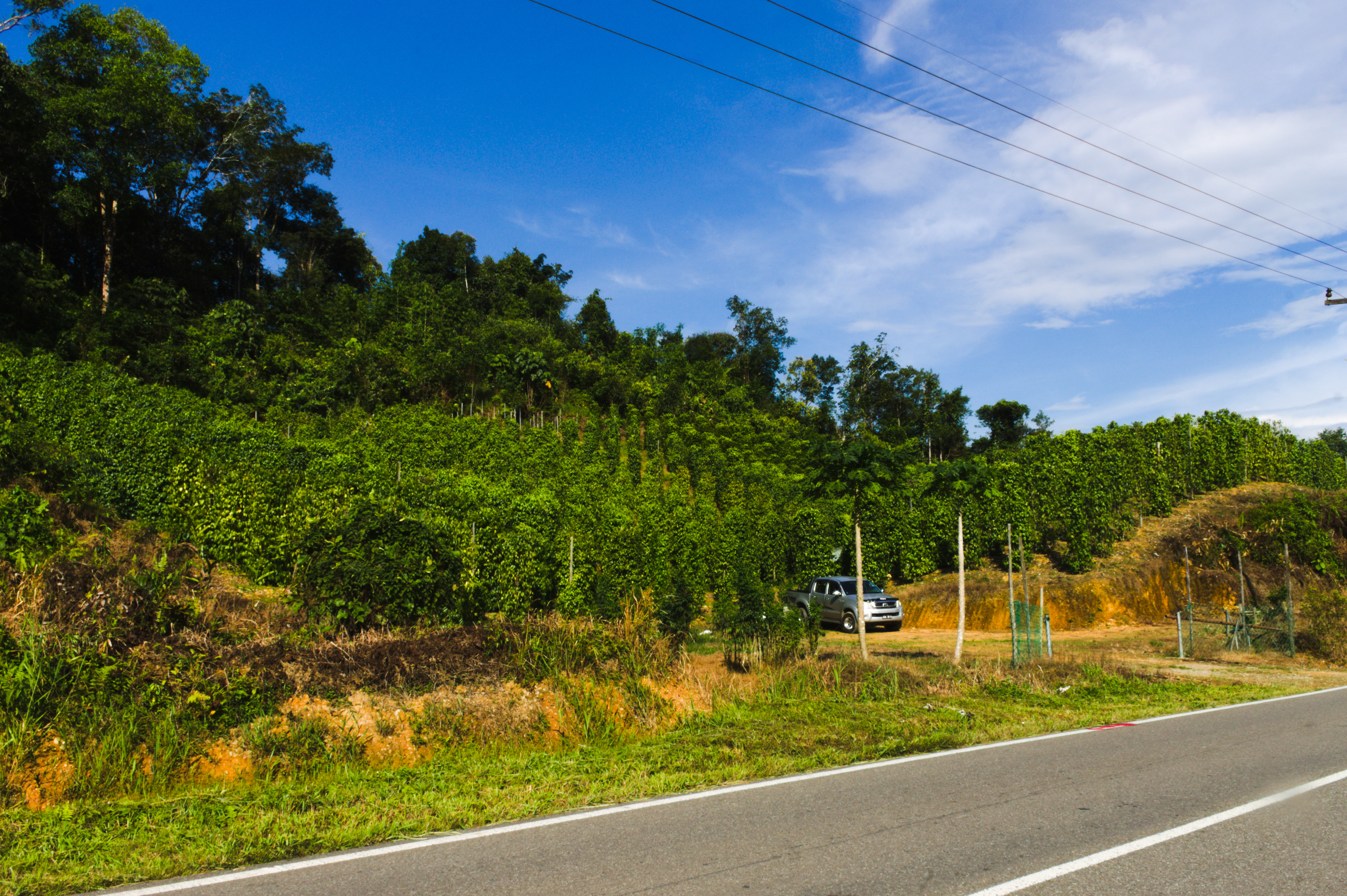
A black pepper plantation near the Pakan road.

In 2017, Pakan District had 2,000 hectares of pepper farms with 5,800 farmers working on them.

== Transport ==
=== Local Bus ===
Route No.	Operating Route	Operator	Remark
6	Sarikei-Pakan	Borneo Bus	

=== Alternate road ===
New road alternative connecting user from Sibu to go directly to Ulu Budu in Saratok district by passing through Pakan provides a shorter time compared to the existing one which passes through T-junction to Sarikei. What used to be about 3 hours journey from Sibu to Saratok will take only about 2 hours. So users on a long journey to Kuching benefit a lot from this road.

Sibu -> Julau -> Bintangor -> Sarikei -> Pakan -> Wak -> Ulu Budu -> Saratok

== Other utilities ==
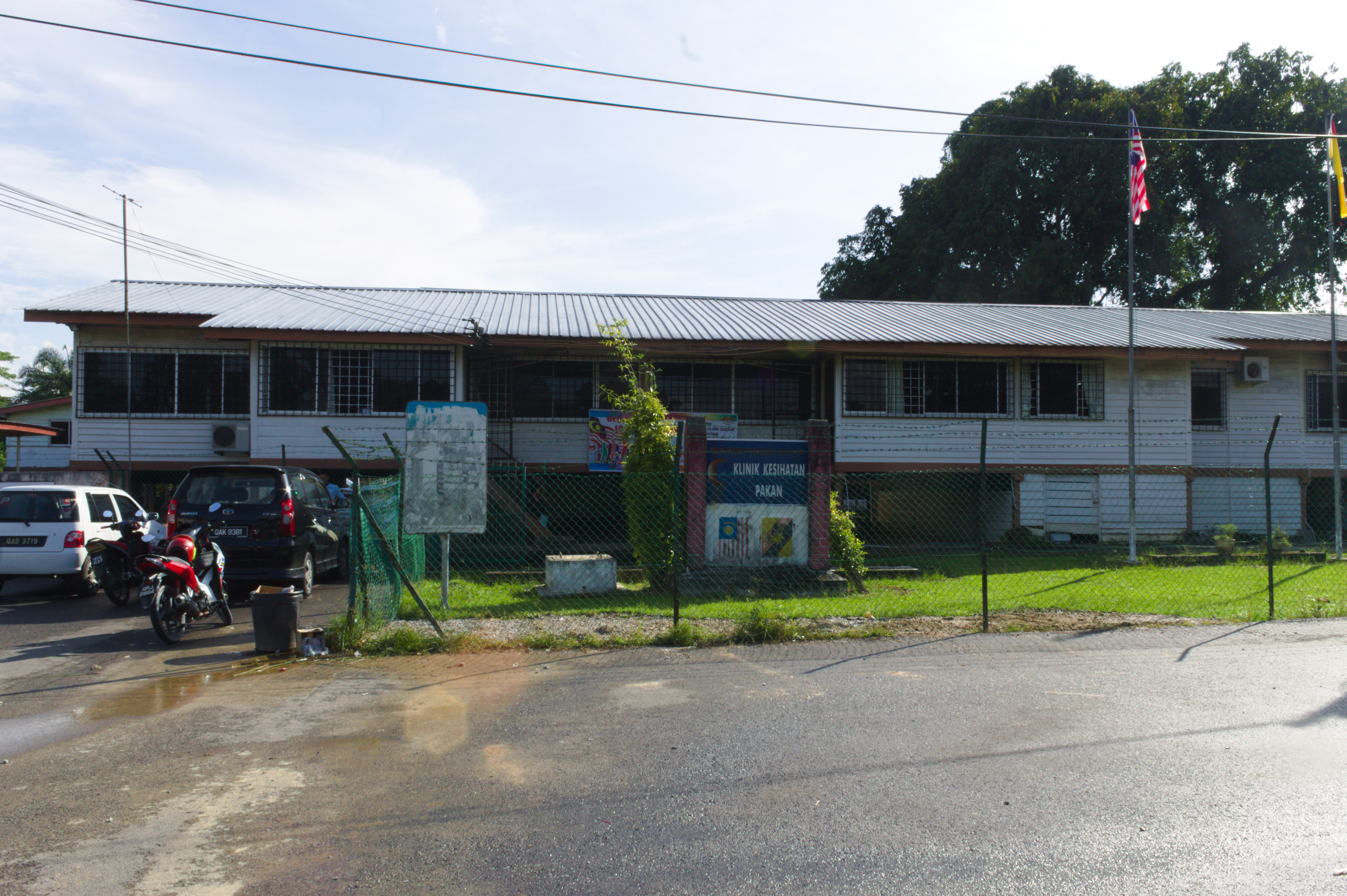
Pakan public health clinic.

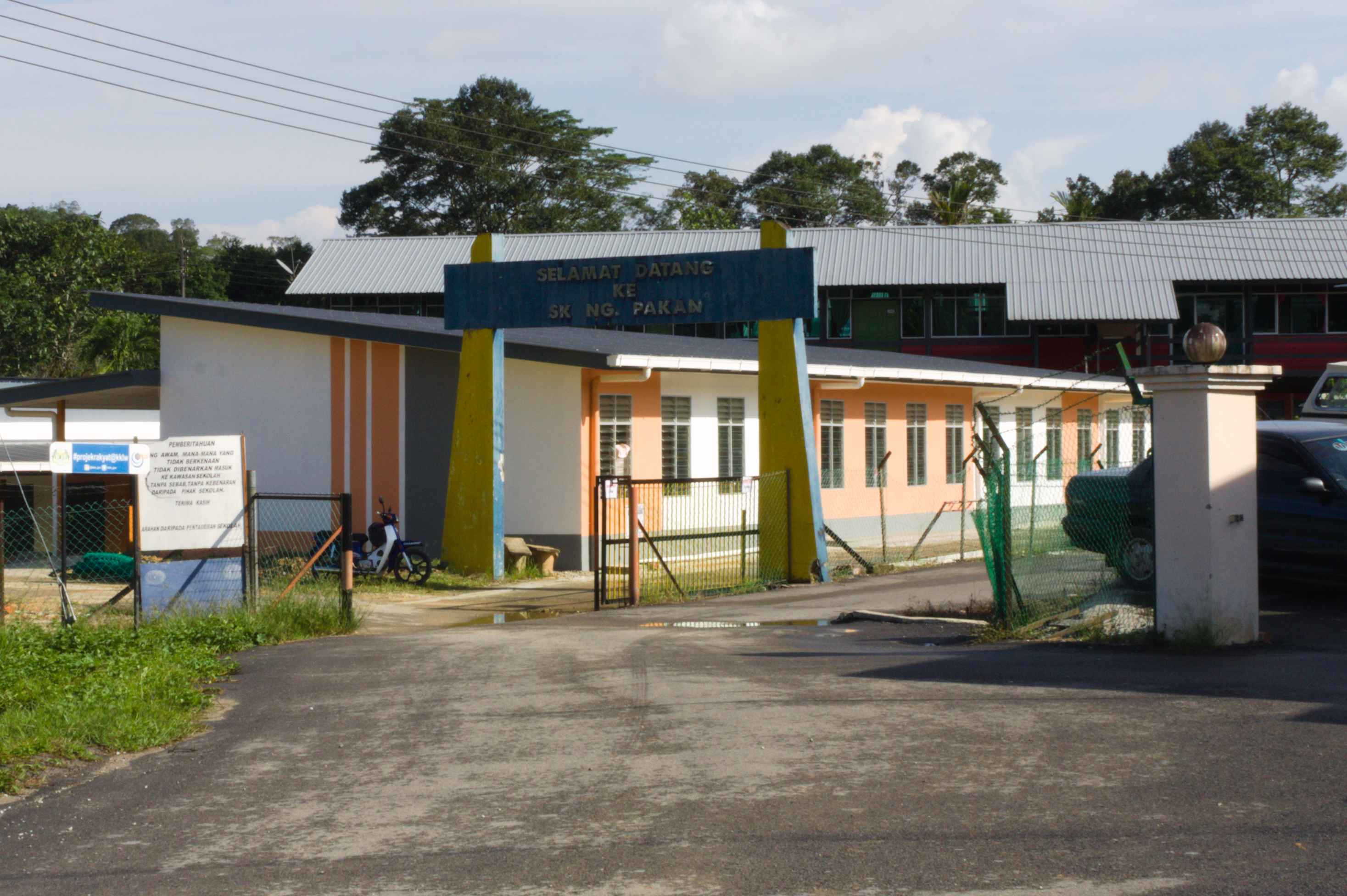
SK Nanga Pakan.

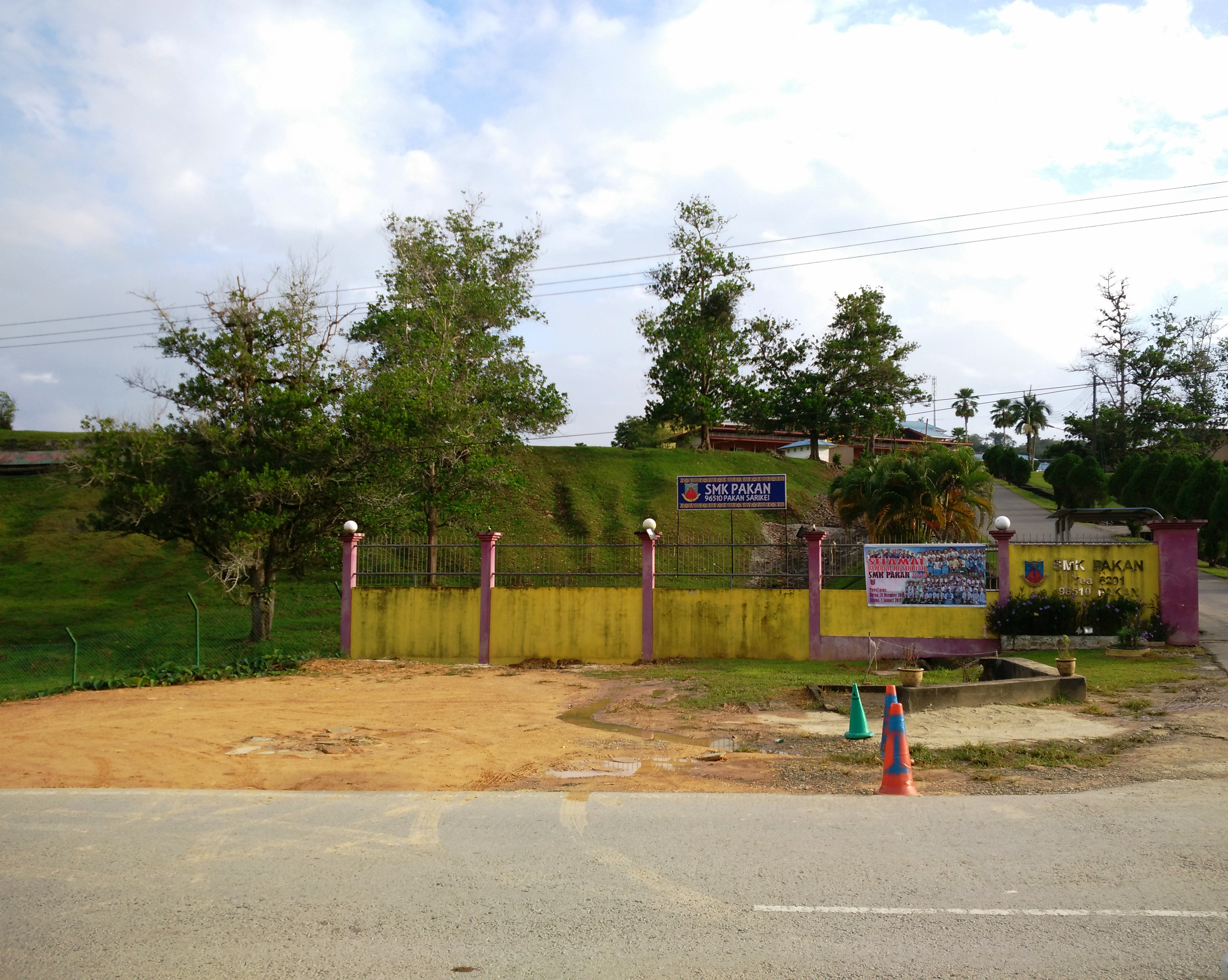
SMK Pakan.

=== Education ===
Primary schools

- SK Nanga Pakan
- SK Nanga Kara
- SK Sungai Sugai
- SK Nanga Wak
- Sk Nanga Sembawang
- Sk Ulu Manding
- Sk Nanga Pedanum
- Sk Nanga Kota
- Sk Nanga Dayu
- Sk Ulu Entabai
- Sk Ulu Entaih
- Sk Nanga Entaih

Secondary school

- SMK Pakan
- (extra information) SMK Meradong (Bintangor), SMK Bintangor (Bintangor), the nearest school most of the upper six students attended after they finishing their form 5.

== Culture and leisure ==
=== Cultural ===
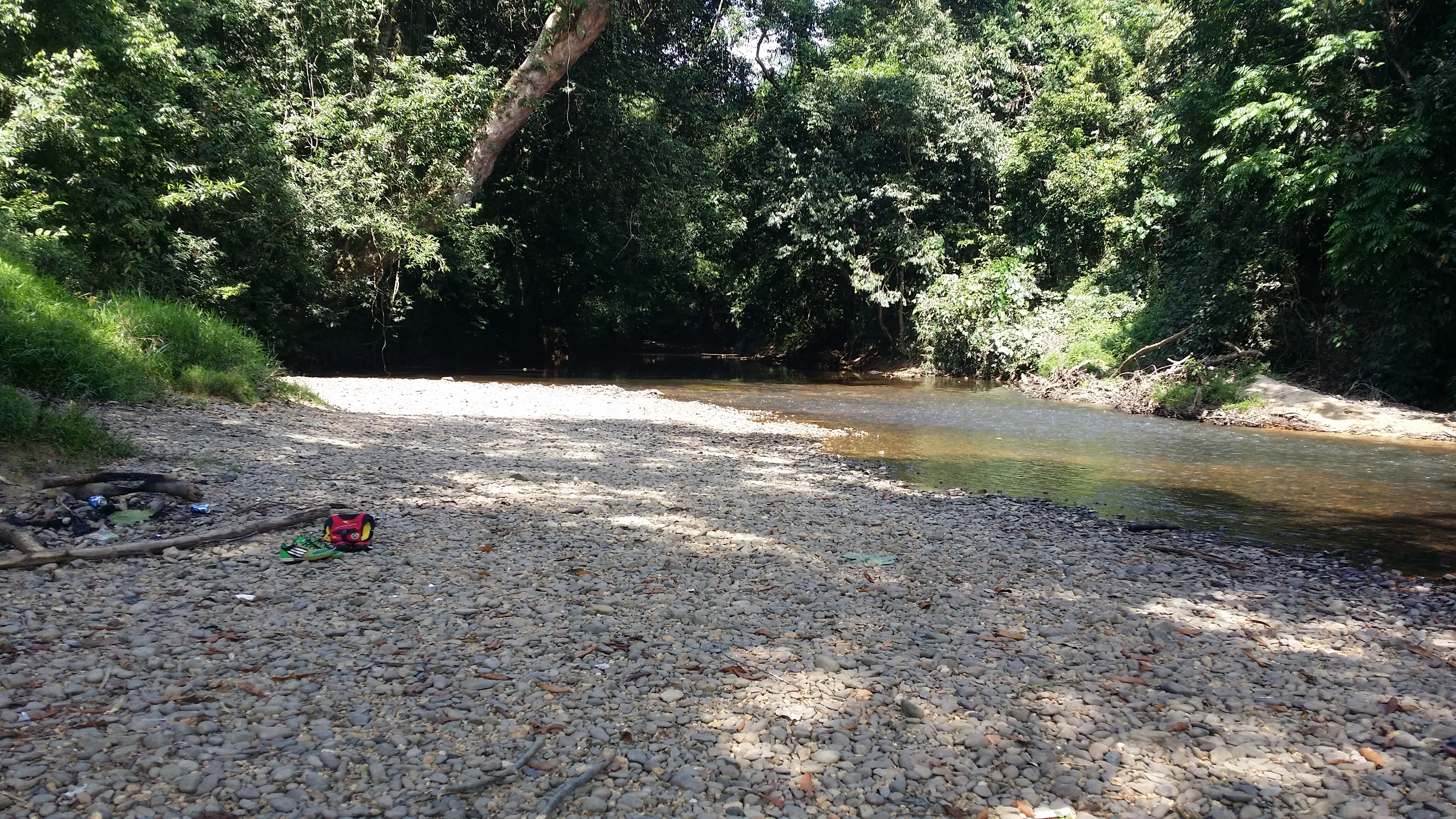
Upper river of Sg Julau, Pakan-Ulu Kota road.

Pesta Pakan (Pakan festival) is a yearly festival held in the town of Pakan since 1988 and usually held around August. It consisted of various activities such as sports, entertainment, culture, and arts and various stalls selling food such as Smoke house (Ruman Asap) and drinks.

=== Historical ===
- Lumbung Rentap at Bukit Sibau (Rentap's final resting place)
- Bukit Uyu (the grave of the Rentap's follower, Uyu, Medan and two more)

=== Leisure and conservation areas ===
- Kerangan Rantau Enjin, Nanga Kelau
- Wong Kuji waterfall
- Kembara Off-Road
