= Jalan Mambong–Sejingkat =

Road in Malaysia

Federal Route 8302
- Jalan Mambong–Sejingkat

Route information
- Maintained by Malaysian Public Works Department
- Length: 10.3 km (6.4 mi)

Major junctions
- North end: Demak Laut Intersection, Kuching Division
- Jalan Wan Alwi; Jalan Stutong; FT 8101 Jalan Datuk Mohammad Musa FT 1-13 (Jalan Kuching–Serian) / AH150
- South end: Mambong Intersection, Samarahan Division

Location
- Country: Malaysia
- Primary destinations: Kota Samarahan, Asajaya

Highway system
- Highways in Malaysia; Expressways; Federal; State

Jalan Mambong–Sejingkat, Federal Route 8302 (formerly Sarawak Route 13), is a major highway in Kuching and Samarahan Division, Sarawak, Malaysia.

This route includes Jalan Keruing, Jalan Belian, Jalan Merbau, Jalan Pelabuhan, Jalan Perimat, Jalan Setia Raja, Jalan Canna and Jalan Mambong–Sejingkat itself.

== Junction lists ==
The entire route is located in Sarawak.

Legend:

- I/C - Interchange, I/S - Intersection, RSA - Rest and service area, OBR - Overhead bridge restaurant, R/R - Restaurant and rest plaza, L/B - Layby, V/P - Vista point, TN - tunnel, T/P - Toll plaza, BR - Bridge
- C - Cloverleaf, S - Stack, T-A - Trumpet-A, T-B - Trumpet-B, DT - Directional-T/Y, SDT - Semi-Directional-T/Y, P-Y - Partial-Y, D - Diamond, P-C - Partial cloverleaf, D-D - Diverging diamond, D-R - Direct ramp

Division	District	Location	km	mi	Name	Destinations	Notes
Kuching	Kuching	Kuching South			Demak Laut I/S	Jalan Demak Laut – Demak Laut Industrial Park; FT 1002 Jalan Bako – Kuching Port (Senari Terminal), Bako National Park, Demak Heights, City centre	4-way signalised intersection
Kuching	Kuching	Kuching South			Kuching Barrage & Shiplock		
Kuching	Kuching	Kuching South			BCCK I/S	Borneo Convention Centre Kuching	3-way signalised intersection
Kuching	Kuching	Kuching South			Pending Causeway		
Kuching	Kuching	Kuching South			Keruing Roundabout	Jalan Semangat – Pending Industrial Estate; Jalan Kemajuan – Bintawa	4-way roundabout
Kuching	Kuching	Kuching South			Mersawa Roundabout	Jalan Mersawa; Jalan Pahlawan; Factory access road	5-way roundabout
Kuching	Kuching	Kuching South			Port Roundabout	Jalan Pelabuhan – Kuching Port (Pending Terminal), Kuching Ferry Terminal	3-way roundabout
Kuching	Kuching	Kuching South			Pending Roundabout	Jalan Dutak Marican Salleh; Tun Salahuddin Bridge – City of Kuching North, Petra Jaya; Jalan Tun Razak	4-way roundabout
Kuching	Kuching	Kuching South			CMS Cement I/S	Jalan Simen Raja – CMS Cement plant	3-way intersection
Kuching	Kuching	Kuching South			Sungai Tabuan Bridge		
Kuching	Kuching	Kuching South			Muara Tabuan Roundabout	Jalan Kempas – Tabuan Jaya, City centre Jalan Muara Tabuan – Sama Jaya Free Industrial Zone	4-way roundabout
Kuching	Kuching	Kuching South			Tabuan Stutong Roundabout	Jalan Wan Alwi – Tabuan Jaya, City centre Jalan Setia Raja – Tabuan Laru, Taman Satria Jaya, Kuching International Airport	4-way roundabout
Kuching	Kuching	Kuching South	0.0	0.0	Canna Roundabout	Jalan Silikon – Customs booth, Sama Jaya Free Industrial Zone; Jalan Stutong – Tabuan Jaya Baru 2, Taman Satria Jaya, Kuching International Airport	4-way signalised intersection
Kuching-Samarahan division border					Sungai Kuap Bridge		
Samarahan	Samarahan	Kota Samarahan	2.1	1.3	Shell Layby (Northwest bound)		
Samarahan	Samarahan	Kota Samarahan	3.2	2.0	Midway Roundabout	Kota Samarahan Industrial Training Institute (ILPKS), Cocoa Research & Development Centre	3-way roundabout
Samarahan	Samarahan	Kota Samarahan	5.1	3.2	Hospital Roundabout	SGH Heart Centre	3-way roundabout
Samarahan	Samarahan	Kota Samarahan	5.9	3.7	Petronas Layby (Northwest bound) – Petronas, Maybank		
Samarahan	Samarahan	Kota Samarahan	6.3	3.9	UNIMAS I/S	Taman Uni Vista; UNIMAS West Campus	3-way signalised intersection with UNIMAS West Campus, Access to Taman Uni Vista for northwest bound traffic only
Samarahan	Samarahan	Kota Samarahan	7.0	4.3	Kota Samarahan; Kampung Sigiting Roundabout	FT 8101 Jalan Datuk Mohammad Musa – Kota Sentosa, Sungai Empit, Town centre, Muara Tuang Ferry Point, UNIMAS East Campus, UiTM Samarahan Campus, Asajaya	4-way roundabout
Samarahan–Kuching division border					Sungai Entingan Bridge		
Kuching	Kuching	Padawan	10.3	6.4	15th Mile I/S	FT 1-13 (Jalan Kuching–Serian) / AH150 – Kuching, Kota Sentosa, Kota Padawan, Siburan, Beratok, Tapah, Serian; Kuching Outer Ring Road – Mambong, Borneo Heights	4-way signalised intersection
1.000 mi = 1.609 km; 1.000 km = 0.621 mi: Incomplete access
