= Wisma Saberkas =

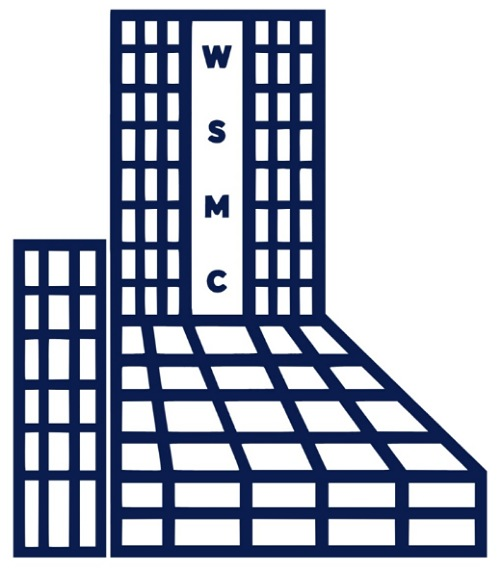

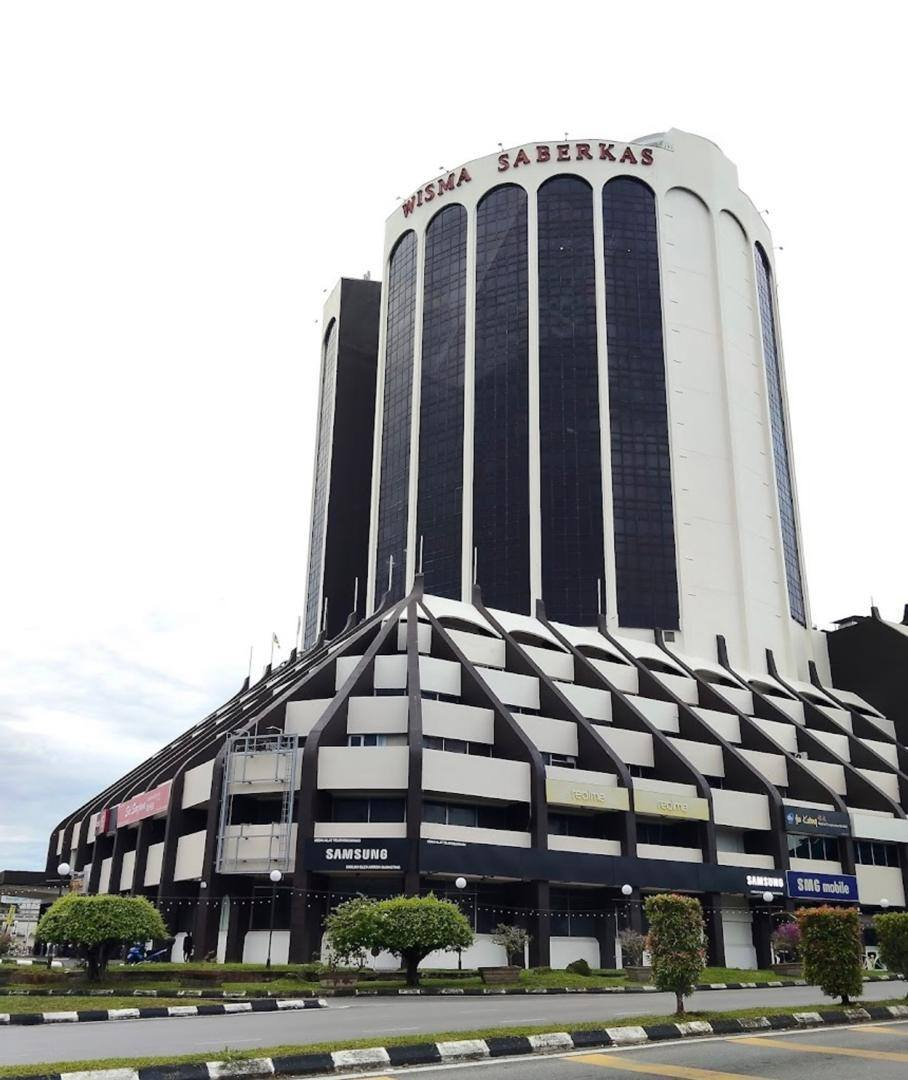
- Location: Kuching, Sarawak, Malaysia
- Coordinates: 1°32′13″N 110°20′26″E
- Address: Jalan Tun Abang Haji Openg, 93150, Kuching, Sarawak, Malaysia.
- Opened: 22 August 1985; 41 years ago
- Manager: Wisma Saberkas Management Corporation
- Owner: Wisma Saberkas Sdn. Bhd.
- Floors: 21
- Public transit: SM12 Jalan Central Timur (to be completed)
- Website: https://wismasaberkas.my/

Wisma Saberkas is a shopping complex and government office building located in Kuching, Sarawak, Malaysia. The property is owned by Wisma Saberkas Sdn. Bhd.. The complex officially opened on 22 August 1985.

== History ==
Wisma Saberkas was built on the site of a former rice mill. The main contractor for its construction was Promet Berhad, a construction company based in Kuala Lumpur. The mechanical and electrical engineering works were carried out by Bintai Kinden Corporation Berhad, an engineering company affiliated with Japan. The development began during early 1980s.

On 22 August 1985, Wisma Saberkas was officially opened by Malaysia’s fourth and seventh Prime Minister, Mahathir Mohamad. It became the first high-rise shopping complex in Kuching. Wisma Saberkas Sdn. Bhd. was incorporated on 25 September 1985. Despite this, Wisma Saberkas has no known direct institutional affiliation with Sarawak United National Youth Organisation (SABERKAS).

Since its opening in 1985, Wisma Saberkas has become one of the major commercial landmarks in Kuching city. During its early years, the shopping complex housed a wide variety of businesses. However, beginning around 2015, with the rapid development of modern shopping malls in Kuching, the number of visitors and business activity at Wisma Saberkas gradually declined. By the 2020s, most of the earliest premises had closed, and majority of the commercial spaces had been taken over by various electronics stores. In the 2020s, Wisma Saberkas serves as one of the main centers for Kuching residents and out-of-town visitors to purchase electronic equipments.

== Architecture ==
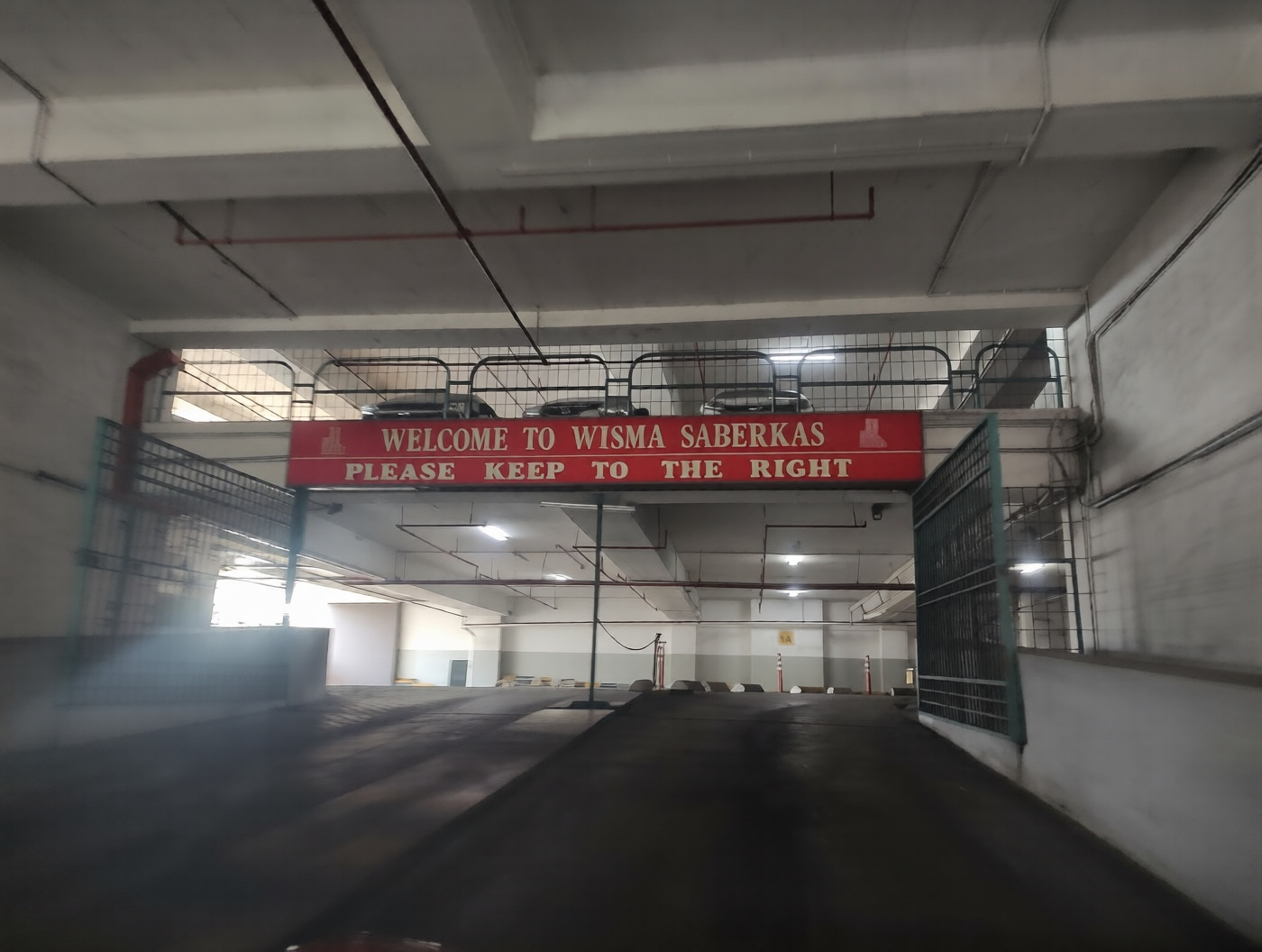
Entrance of Wisma Saberkas car park with right lane driving sign

Wisma Saberkas consists of a seven-storey rectangular podium and a fourteen-storey cylindrical tower. The seven-storey podium serves as a parking and shopping area, while thirteen of the upper floors are used as office spaces for government officials. A row of open-air hawker stalls was also built between the top floor of the podium and the lowest floor of the tower.

Although Malaysia uses left-hand traffic system, the design of Wisma Saberkas allows vehicles to circulate around the exterior of the building before entering the parking levels. As a result, drivers must temporarily use the right-side lane to access the parking area.

Each level of the podium is equipped with a pair of escalators and a staircase located close to one another, and also a pair of glass lifts.

== Tenants ==
There are 80 percent of Wisma Saberkas' outlets are occupied by the individual business owners. Prior 2010s, Wisma Saberkas housed a wide variety of businesses, including restaurants, banks, department stores, electronics shops, music stores, art learning centres, and CD stores. Among the well-known establishments at the time were the restaurants All Joy Good Food Centre, Hong Kong Noodle House (Chinese: 香港麵粥家), Stone Ice, and Kentucky Fried Chicken, a branch of Public Bank, the department stores Hibariya (Chinese: 雲雀超級市場暨百貨有限公司) and Ngiu Kee, the shoes store Bata, the electronics retailer PC Image, the art centre Saberkas Arts School (Chinese: 青統美術學校), and the CD retailer Speedy Video. Certain Malaysia government official offices, such as Malaysian Public Works Department, Department of Irrigation and Drainage Sarawak (JIDS), Jabatan Pergigian Bahagian Kuching, and the Department of Agriculture Sarawak also exist in the complex.
