= Dorémart =

Malaysia supermarket chain

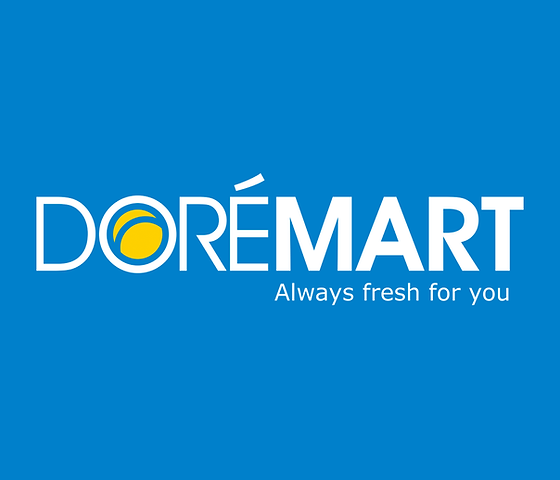
- Logo since 2021. Doraemon's bell has been vectorized as capital "o".
- Industry: Retail
- Founded: 2015; 11 years ago
- Headquarters: Malaysia
- Area served: Malaysia
- Key people: Hii Kah Hock; Wong Su Ping
- Website: doremart.com.my

Dorémart is a retail chain of Malaysia supermarket, owned by Doremart Sdn. Bhd., Sarawak.

== History ==
Dorémart was founded in 2015 by the entrepreneurial couple Hii Kah Hock (Chinese: 許家福) and Wong Su Ping (Chinese: 王淑萍).

Prior to establishing the supermarket chain, the founders were involved in a small grocery business in Sri Aman, Sarawak, beginning in 2005. The business initially operated as a neighbourhood grocery store serving the surrounding community.

Over time, the store gained support from local residents, which enabled the founders to expand their operations. Approximately ten years later, the first larger retail outlet was established at the same location, marking the beginning of the company’s transition into a supermarket format.

During the late 2010s, increasing competition within the regional retail market prompted the founders to reorganise the business structure and expand the company’s retail operations. The chain gradually developed into a supermarket model serving multiple towns in Sarawak.

Prior to 2018, the company operated under an earlier brand identity. Following internal discussions and public feedback through the company’s official social media channels, the brand underwent a renaming process. In 2021, the company formally adopted the name Dorémart.

In January 2020, statues were installed near the Dorémart Sarikei outlet, which later became a small attraction among visitors and residents in the area.

Later in June 2020, the Dorémart mobile application was released on the Google Play Store, providing customers with access to membership services and promotional information.

In April 2026, The Doremart Was Going To West Malaysia. The First Doremart Store In Klang

== Chains ==
- Kuching
  - Dorémart Pines Square Batu Kawa
  - Dorémart Tropics City
- Kota Sentosa
  - Dorémart Kota Sentosa
- Kota Samarahan
  - Dorémart Taman Samarindah
- Sri Aman
  - Dorémart New Sri Aman
  - Dorémart Old Sri Aman
- Betong
  - Dorémart Betong
  - Dorémart Betong Time Square
- Sarikei
  - Dorémart Pasar Borong Sarikei
  - Dorémart Kompleks Sukan Sarikei
- Sibu
  - Dorémart Sibu Jaya
  - Dorémart Hanns Residence, Sibu
  - Dorémart Jalan Redada, Sibu
  - Dorémart Sungai Merah, Sibu
- Bintulu
  - Dorémart Bintulu
- Klang
  - Doremart GM Klang

== Incident ==
On 11 April 2022, an 18-year-old male employee of Dorémart Bintulu was crushed to death by a goods hoist. 25 April 2025, Dorémart Sdn. Bhd. was fined a total of RM95,000 for failing to implement a safe working system, failing to submit the incident report within seven days, and the invalid management of the goods hoist qualification certificate.

== See also ==
- List of supermarket chains in Malaysia
