= 大家樂 =

大家樂 (lit. "Everyone's joy") may refer to the Chinese name of:

- Café de Coral, a Hong Kong fast-food restaurant group
- All Joy, a Malaysian bakery and restaurant chain
- Da Jia Le, a way of gambling in Taiwan at 1980s
