= Lepapa =

Malaysia market, supermarket and hypermarket chain

- Company type: Subsidiary
- Industry: Retail
- Founded: 2019; 7 years ago
- Headquarters: Malaysia
- Area served: Malaysia
- Key people: Lee Chin Teck (managing director)
- Number of employees: 500
- Website: lepapa.my

Lepapa (Chinese: 李爸爸, stylised as LePaPa) is a retail chain of Malaysia market, supermarket, hypermarket, independently owned by Tecktonic & Sons Holdings Sdn. Bhd., Sarawak.

== History ==
Lepapa was founded in 2019 by the managing director of Tecktonic & Sons, Lee Chin Teck (Chinese: 李晉德). The retail chain is named based on the family name of Lee Chin Teck's late father, Lee Nyan Choi (Chinese: 李源財), a former assemblyman in Bau, Sarawak, and 'father ('papa')' in Chinese language, to honour his legacy. Overall, the retail is modelled based on Kmart New Zealand.

In August 2019, the first Lepapa Hypermarket outlet was opened at Serian Durian Piazza Commercial Centre, officially declared open by Sarawak Deputy Chief Minister Datuk Amar Awang Tengah Ali Hasan, Assistant Minister of International Trade and Industry, Industrial Terminal and Entrepreneur Development Malcolm Mussen Lamoh, Bukit Semuja assemblyman John Ilus, and Serian Resident Johnathan Lugoh. The second outlet, known as Lepapa Market, was launched at Gala City Commercial Centre, Kuching in January 2020. This was followed by the opening of the third branch, Lepapa Supermarket, located at Matang Jaya, Kuching in June 2020. The fourth outlet, another Lepapa Hypermarket, began operations in Aiman Mall, Kota Samarahan in the later months of 2020.

== See also ==
- List of supermarket chains in Malaysia
