= List of supermarket chains in Malaysia =

This is a list of supermarket chains in Malaysia.

== Current supermarket chains ==
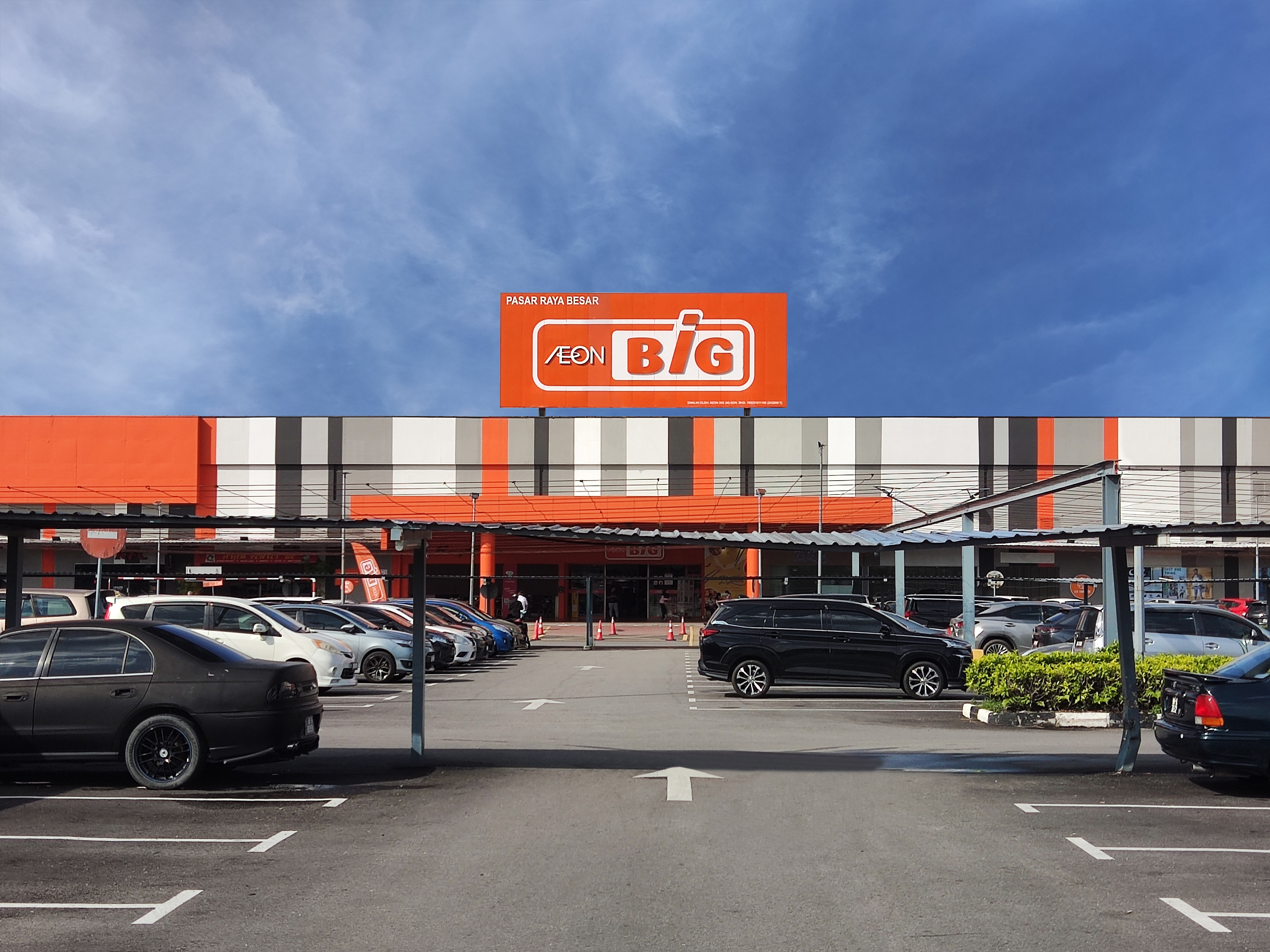
An AEON BiG store in Batu Pahat, Johor

=== Nationwide ===
- 99 Speedmart
- AEON Group
  - AEON
  - AEON MaxValu Prime
  - AEON BiG (Formerly Carrefour)
  - DAISO
- AgroBazaar
- Econsave
- Giant (Hypermarket)
- KK Super Mart
- Lotus's (Formerly Tesco, Tesco Extra)
- Mydin
- Eco-Shop
- MR.DIY

=== West Malaysia ===
- Ben's Independent Grocer
- Big 10 Grocer
- Billion Supermarket
- BS Fresh Mart
- Ceria 99
- Checkers Hypermarket
- CLC Pasaraya
- C-Mart
- Eco-Shop
- Family Foods Market
- Family Market
- Family Store
- Fresh Choice Supermarket
- GAMA Supermarket & Departmental Store
- GCH Retail
  - Cold Storage
  - Giant Hypermarket
  - Mercató
- GT Mart
- Haniffa Department Store
- HeroMarket
- Homes Fresh Grocer
- Isetan Foodmarket (by Isetan)
- Jaya Grocer
- K Grocer
- LuLu Hypermarket (Closed)
- MeMiZoooZooo Grocer
- Nirwana Hypermarket
- NSK Grocer (supermarket chain of NSK Trade City)
- OMG Wholesale Mart
- Pacific Grocer
- Pak Grocer
- Pantai Selamat Supermarket
- Pasaraya Aneka
- Pasaraya Borong Big
- Pasaraya Borong Matahari
- Pasaraya CS
- Pasaraya Gold Star Best Mart
- Pasaraya Grand Union
- Pasaraya K Ceria
- Pasaraya Megamart
- Pasaraya Rakan
- Qra
- Redtick (serving East Malaysia)
- Sabasun HyperRuncit
- Salamku Supermarket
- Sam's Groceria
- Segi Fresh
- Selections Groceries
- SOGO
- Star Grocer
- ST Rosyam Mart
- Sunshine
- Super Cowboy
- Super Seven
- TMC Supermarket
- TF Value Mart
- The Food Merchant
- TMG Mart
- The Store
- Urban Marketplace
- Village Grocer

=== East Malaysia ===
- Bataras
- Everrise
- Servay Hypermarket
- CCK Fresh Mart
- Milimewa Superstore

==== Sarawak ====
- Boulevard (Malaysia)
- CCFresh
- Dorémart
- Emart (Malaysia)
- Everrise
- Everwin
- Farley (Malaysia)
- H & L Supermarket
- Lepapa
- Ngiu Kee
- MDS Mart
- Sing Kwong
- Ta Kiong
- Upwell Supermarket

==== Sabah ====
- CKS Group
- TCT Retailing Group Sdn Bhd
- Kedai Runcit Usaha Kami (closed)
- Sthamin Supermarket

== Former supermarket chains ==
- Carrefour (Taken over by AEON Group to become AEON BiG)
- Emporium Supermarket & Departmental Store
- Fajar Supermarket
- Hiong Kong Supermarket
- Jaya Supermarket
- Kimisawa Supermarket
- Makro (Taken over by Tesco to become Tesco Extra)
- Ngiu Kee
- Pasaraya Greatwall
- Pasaraya Ocean
- Rich Supermarket
- Senyum Supermarket
- Costco
- Sri Kota Supermarket
- Tesco (Taken over by Lotus's)
  - Tesco Extra
- Tops
- Yaohan Supermarket
- Kedai Runcit Usaha Kami
- Yuyi Supermarket
