= All Joy =

Malaysian bakery and restaurant chain

- All Joy Good Food Centre logo during early 2020s.
- Trade name: All Joy
- Native name: 大家樂
- Industry: Bakery (All Joy Bakery); Restaurant (All Joy Good Food Centre)
- Founded: 1981; 45 years ago in Kuching, Sarawak, Malaysia
- Founder: Chai family
- Defunct: April 2025
- Headquarters: Malaysia
- Products: Bread, cakes and buns (All Joy Bakery); Noodles (All Joy Good Food Centre)
- Website: www.facebook.com/alljoymacammacamada/

All Joy (Chinese: 大家樂) was a Malaysian bakery and restaurant chain based in Kuching, Sarawak, Malaysia.

All Joy Bakery (Chinese: 大家樂麵包屋) and All Joy Good Food Centre (Chinese: 大家樂美食中心) were founded by the Chai identical twins. The establishments gained popularity for offering high-quality food at affordable prices, catering particularly to a predominantly rural-based clientele in Kuching.

== History ==
The business began in 1981 as a small bakery located at the Kuching Open Air Market, Jalan Khoo Hun Yeang. It became known for its signature bread products, including Milo buns, butter buns, chicken buns, Swiss rolls, satay chicken buns, and chicken hot dog rolls. In 1983, the Chai twins amicably separated to pursue individual ventures. Chai Kee Lee continued to operate All Joy Bakery, while his twin established All Joy Good Food Centre at Wisma Saberkas, which became known for popular staple dishes such as rojak chicken chop, mie jawa with fried chicken, belacan bihun, and the All Joy signature ice cream.

Following the global COVID-19 pandemic, in October 2022, All Joy Good Food Centre downsized its operations, relocated to a smaller unit within the same shopping mall and rebranded as All Joy Macam Macam Ada Cafe. In April 2025, the quiet closure of the food centre, coupled with rumors surrounding Chai Kee Lee's retirement and the rising costs of the ingredients, the impending closure of All Joy Bakery drew widespread attention and discussion among Kuching residents.

During its final week of operations, the bakery saw an overwhelming turnout of nostalgic customers, resulting in traffic congestion in the city centre. Kuching South City Council mayor, Dato Wee Hong Seng, and Bandar Kuching Member of Parliament, Dr. Kelvin Yii Lee Wuen, both acknowledged the significance of All Joy's legacy and the strong sense of food nostalgia among locals through brief public remarks.

To manage the large crowds, the bakery implemented a two-session opening schedule; briefly operating in the morning before closing to control the crowd, and reopening in the afternoon to serve more customers. Purchases were limited to two buns per person.

On 30 April 2025, All Joy Bakery officially ceased operations, marking the end of All Joy chains.

== Menu and products ==
=== All Joy Bakery ===
- Milo buns
- Butter buns
- Chicken buns
- Red bean buns
- Cheese buns
- Swiss rolls
- Satay chicken buns
- Chicken hot dog rolls

=== All Joy Good Food Centre ===
- Rojak chicken chop
- Mie jawa with fried chicken
- Belacan bihun
- Lok-lok
- Chicken with cheese sandwiches
- Popia
- Thai styled bean thread
- Yam delight
- Pandan delight
- Chicken egg burger
- Nasi ayam penyet
- Ais kacang
- White lady
- Bubur cha cha
- Oreo cornflakes
- Milo Horlicks split
- All Joy signature ice cream

== See also ==
- Malaysian cuisine
- Sarawakian cuisine
