= NSK Trade City =

Supermarket of Malaysia

NSK Trade City Sdn. Bhd.
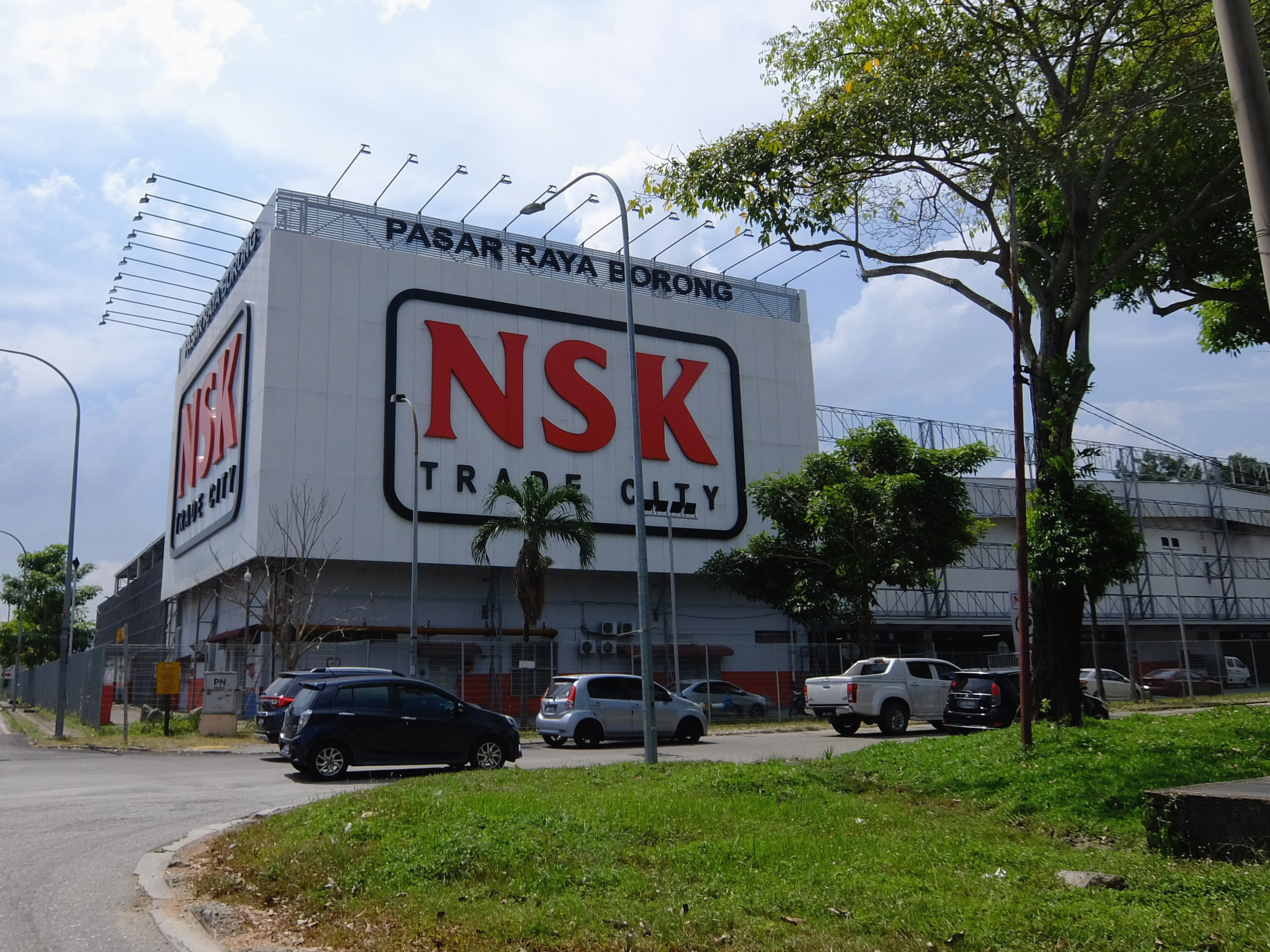
- NSK Trade City branch in Pandan
- Type: Private limited company
- Industry: Wholesale and Retail
- Founded: 14 May 1985; 41 years ago in Chow Kit
- Founder: Lim's Family
- Headquarters: Wisma Yap Tieh, Selayang, Batu 8 Off Jalan Ipoh, Selangor Darul Ehsan
- Key people: Lim Chou Bu (Chairman and Founder); Kenny Chen (Director)
- Website: nsktrade.com (NSK Trade City) nskonline.com.my (NSK Grocer)

NSK Trade City Sdn Bhd (doing business as NSK Trade City and colloquially known as NSK) is a network of local wholesalers and retailers based in Malaysia. The company's name, "NSK" is short for New Seng Kee. It operates in the grocery stores industry and was incorporated on 28 August 2003. The net profit margin of NSK Trade City Sdn Bhd increased by 1.37% in 2019.

== History ==
NSK started off as a family business by the Lim family, selling daily groceries and household goods at Pasar Chow Kit in 1985. Somewhere in 1991, the company then grew from a small kiosk business to a big retail store that offers a variety of grocery and household items which was located along Jalan Raja, Kuala Lumpur.

In December 2018, NSK officially opened its 21st outlet at the ground floor of BMC Mall in Bandar Mahkota Cheras and a total RM8mil had been invested for the construction of the huge outlet.

On 31 December 2020, NSK launched its 30th outlet at Star Avenue Lifestyle Mall located in Shah Alam. The outlet is one of the mall's anchor tenant spanning across 36,000 square feet (3,300 m^{2})

On 11 January 2022, NSK Grocer launched an outlet in Quill City Mall, Kuala Lumpur, offering local and imported products. The outlet spans 85,000 square feet (7,900 m2), and includes a fresh food section, dry goods section, wholesale section, and delicatessen.

== Controversy ==
One of its supermarkets in Selayang allegedly displayed frog meat in the seafood counter. This issue raise concern and seen as insensitivity to Malay Muslims. NSK Trade City Sdn Bhd (NSK) has issued a public apology following the incident.

== See also ==
- Econsave
- Mydin
- List of hypermarkets
