= Ngiu Kee =

Malaysian chain department store

- Ngiu Kee logo during the late 2000s, with added slogan
- Industry: Retail
- Founded: 1953; 73 years ago
- Defunct: July 25, 2011; 15 years ago
- Headquarters: Sibu, Malaysia
- Area served: Malaysia
- Key people: Yong Siew Kat (chief executive officer, executive director)
- Number of employees: 735 (as of 2006)
- Website: nkstoreonline.com

Ngiu Kee
- Traditional Chinese: 堯記
- Simplified Chinese: 尧记
Transcriptions
Standard Mandarin
- Hanyu Pinyin: Yáo Jì

Ngiu Kee (stylised as ngiukee) was a retail chain of Malaysia department store and hypermarket, owned by Ngiu Kee Sdn. Bhd., Sarawak. It is known as the oldest retail chain in Sarawak and Malaysia.

== History ==
Founded since 1953 by two entrepreneurs, Wong Yuk Siew (Chinese: 黃世賢) and his sister's husband Tang Kuok Ngiu (Chinese: 鄭國堯), they began their business with their first textile shop with knitwear factory at High Street, Sibu. Ngiu Kee was named based on Tang Kuok Ngiu's name.

Due to the urban development of Sibu in the late 1950s, Ngiu Kee moved to a double-storied shop at Raminway and transformed into a department store that sold clothes, shoes, baby essentials, beauty care items and other related products, such as Crocodile and Arnold Palmer. By the beginning of 1970s, Ngiu Kee had operated its branches across Sarawak, mainly in Miri, Kuching, Bintulu and Sarikei, as well as Kota Kinabalu and Sandakan in Sabah.

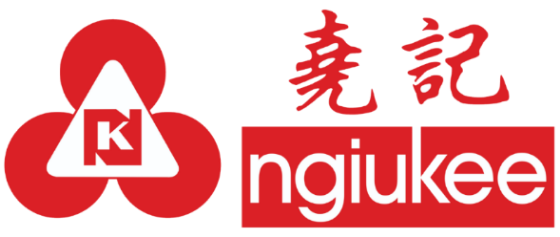
Ngiu Kee old logo (used since 1980s)

During 1996, followed by Wong Yuk Siew's retirement, the Wong family sold the shares of Ngiu Kee. Ngiu Kee Corporation (M) Berhad was incorporated in Malaysia on 26 March 1996 as a private limited company under the Companies Act, 1965 in the name of Ngiu Kee Corporation (M) Sdn. Bhd. In preparation for its listing on the Second Board of Bursa Malaysia Securities Berhad, it was converted into a public limited company on 23 May 1996.

In July 2010, Ngiu Kee Corporation Bhd. had defaulted on outstanding loans amounting to RM13.96 million due to insufficient funds, and being classified under the regulator's Practice Note 17 (PN17) category. The outstanding RM13.96 million loan followed an earlier settlement of RM4.32 million by Ngiu Kee Corporation Bhd. to Bank Islam, and also outstanding loans of RM34.39 million from CIMB Bank.

Shares of Ngiu Kee Corporation Bhd. was last traded unchanged at 11.5 sen on Wednesday for a market capitalisation of RM7.9 million. In 2010, the stock had fallen 46.51%, underperforming the FBM KLCI’s 2.8% gain. Bank of New York Mellon Corp. was the single largest shareholder in Ngiu Kee Corporation Bhd. with a 9.52% stake.

During 2011, Ngiu Kee Corporation Bhd faced suspension on 21 July and delisting on 25 July after it failed to submit its regularisation plan to the regulators for approval within the timeframe. Ngiu Kee share price closed 2.5 sen lower at five sen on Wednesday with 53,200 shares done.

== Chains ==
- Sarawak
  - Ngiu Kee, Kuching
  - Ngiu Kee, Bau
  - Ngiu Kee, Sibu
  - Ngiu Kee, Sarikei
  - Ngiu Kee, Mukah
  - Ngiu Kee, Bintulu
  - Ngiu Kee, Limbang
  - Ngiu Kee, Lawas
- Sabah
  - Ngiu Kee, Kota Kinabalu
  - Ngiu Kee, Sandakan

== See also ==
- List of supermarket chains in Malaysia
