= Econsave =

Malaysia supermarket chain

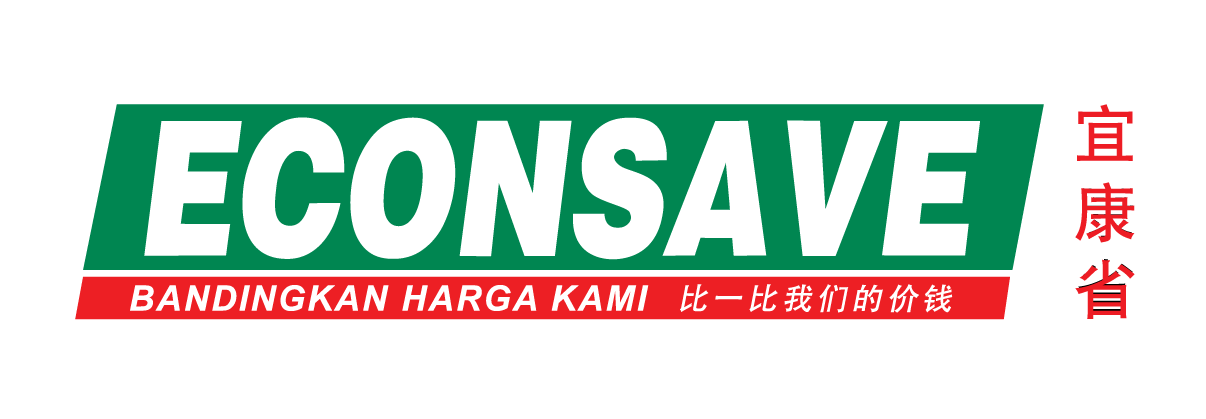
- Type: Private Limited Company
- Industry: Retail
- Founded: 1955; 71 years ago in Klang, Malaysia
- Founders: The Lai Family
- Headquarters: Shah Alam, Selangor, Malaysia
- Number of locations: 108 hyper/supermarket (2025)
- Revenue: (USD 1 Billion)
- Owner: Econsave Cash & Carry Sdn Bhd
- Number of employees: (8000)
- Website: econsave.com.my

Econsave is a supermarket chain in Malaysia owned by Econsave Cash & Carry Sdn. Bhd. It was founded in 1955 by the Lai family as a sundry store in Klang, Selangor. Econsave is also known to manufacture "Econsave" and "E&S" branded goods.

As of 2025, Econsave is the largest chain of supermarket/hypermarket in Malaysia with over 108 branches in Peninsular Malaysia, Sabah and Sarawak. A significant portion of the locations are located in Peninsular Malaysia with a growing presence in Sabah and Sarawak.

== History ==
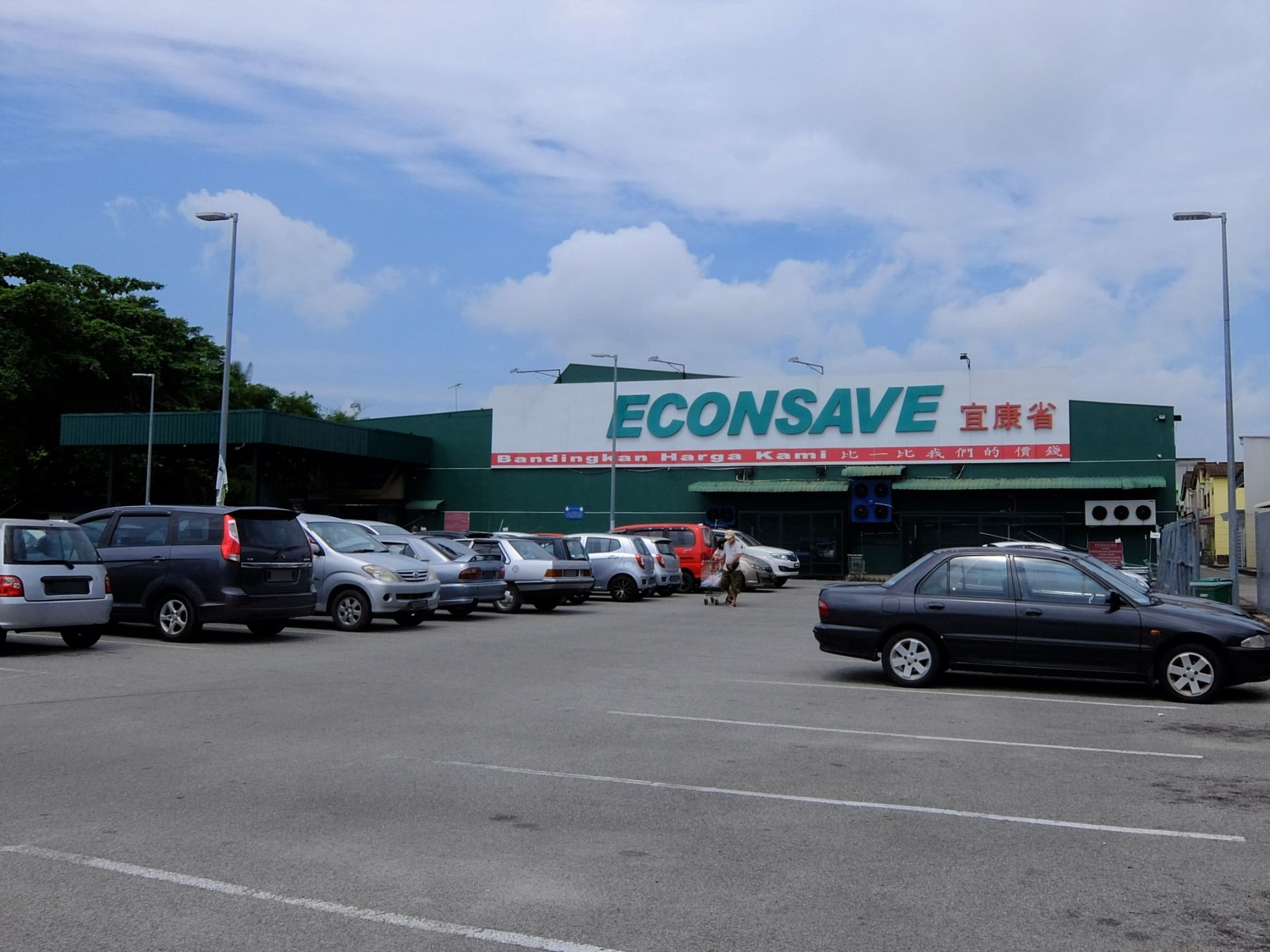
Econsave in Pontian, Johor

The history of Econsave began with a wooden sundry shop in Port Klang more than 60 years ago. In the home state of Selangor, Econsave has the largest and most extensive network of branches in all the main towns in Malaysia.

== See also ==
- List of hypermarkets
- List of supermarkets in Malaysia
