= Sarawak General Hospital =

Hospital in Kuching, Sarawak, Malaysia

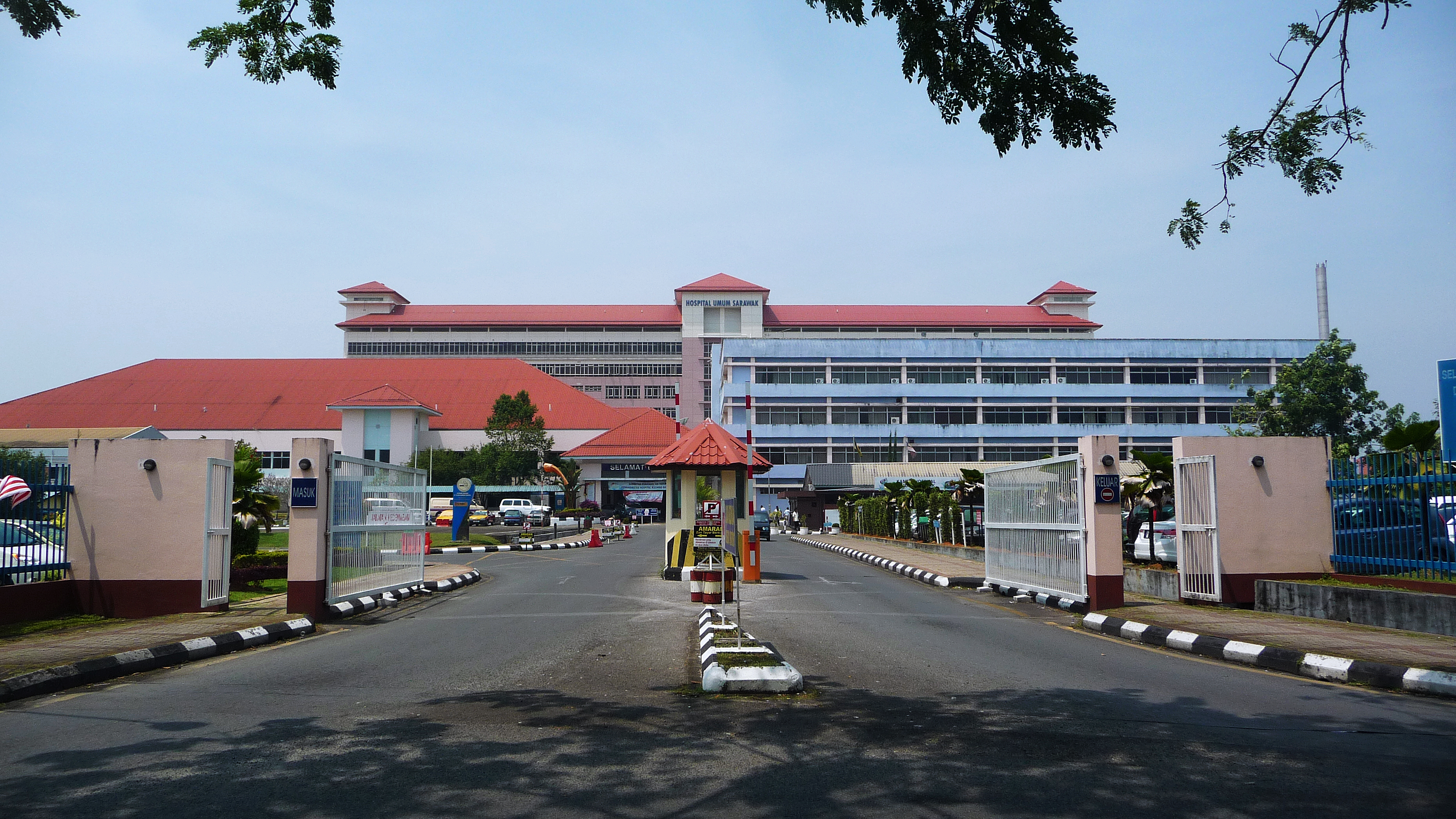
- The Sarawak General Hospital

Geography
- Location: Kuching, Sarawak, Malaysia
- Coordinates: 1°32′35″N 110°20′21″E

Organisation
- Type: General
- Affiliated university: Universiti Malaysia Sarawak

Services
- Emergency department: Yes
- Beds: 1005

Helipads
- Helipad: Yes

History
- Founded: 1870

Links
- Website: hus.moh.gov.my
- Lists: Hospitals in Malaysia

Sarawak General Hospital (Malay: Hospital Umum Sarawak) is the largest general hospital in the state of Sarawak, Malaysia. It is one out of two main tertiary and referral hospitals in East Malaysia (the other being Queen Elizabeth Hospital, Kota Kinabalu, Sabah). In its earlier years, it was known as Kuching General Hospital.

== History ==
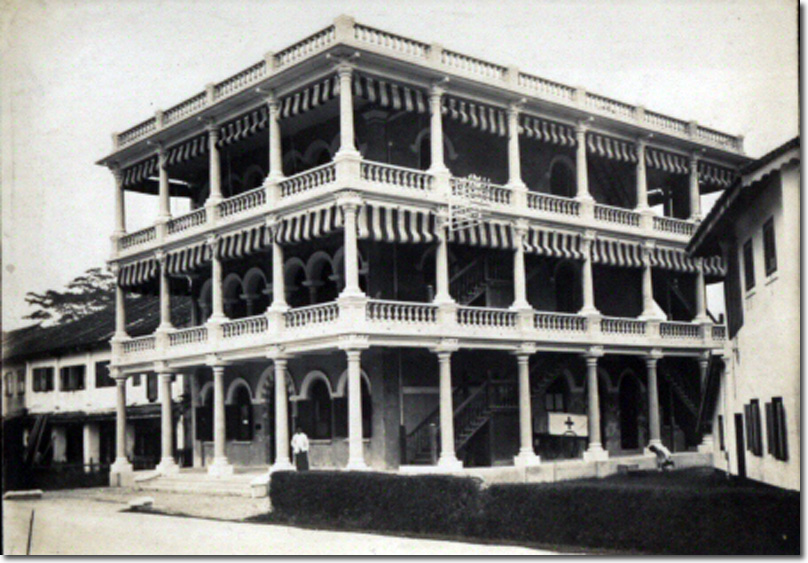
Kuching hospital and dispensary in 1909.

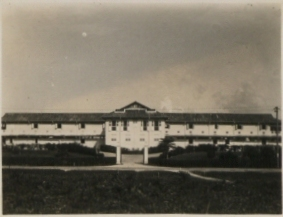
Kuching General Hospital in 1930

Sarawak General Hospital has been in existence since 1870. However, no proper historical records have been preserved of its existence.

The earliest record about the hospital is from 1910. Based from this documentation, the hospital was initially located at the current site of the Kuching Central Prison (later renamed into "Pavilion Building" and converted to Sarawak Textile Museum in 2000) and a total of 920 patients were admitted to the hospital during that year.

In 1925, construction of a new hospital started at Jalan Tun Abang Haji Openg. The new hospital was operational from 1931. From its foundation up until at least the outbreak of World War II, the hospital was known as Kuching General Hospital.

After World War II, the hospital was unable to meet the growing needs of the population. In 1957, a proposal to build a new and modern hospital was put forward. A total of RM13.5 million was spent for the 1964 - 1968 Development Plan and the consultation and management fees amounting to RM8.2 million was paid for by the Australian Government under the Colombo Plan.

The construction of the hospital was planned in 2 phases. Phase I involved the building of an 8-story Main Block, including the Emergency Unit. Phase I construction began in 1965 and was completed in May 1970. By then, the cost of construction grew to RM17.8 million. The majority of the cost amounting to RM17.3 million was borne by the federal government while the rest was paid by the state government.

Phase II involved the completion of an extra floor in the east wing and an additional five stories in the western part of the Main Block. Phase II construction began in September 1970 and was completed in 1972.

The new hospital then was able to accommodate 582 patients and had many modern facilities.

In the subsequent years, additions were made to the hospital, including Houseman Quarters A (1977), mortuary (1978), laboratory block (1980), pharmacy department renovation (1988), specialist clinics (1993), Houseman Quarters B (1994), clinical and inpatient block (2000), refurbishment of main tower block (2009), and conversion of Houseman Quarters A to infectious disease isolation ward (2009).

SGH had 1005 beds as of 2012.

== Specialisations and services ==
Several units such as Department of Radiotherapy and Oncology (1985), Physiotherapy Unit (1987), and Haemodialysis unit (1987) was formed

In Medicine, before 1987 there was only the department of General Medicine with 3 general physicians. In August of that year, Dr Chew Peng Hong was transferred to head the Department of medicine of the hospital. Dr Chew also performed the duties of a paediatrician and an anaesthetist apart from being a medical physician.

By the time Dr Chew Peng Hong retired in 2003, he had set up the following subspecialties in Medicine: nephrology, dermatology, neurology, rheumatology, chest medicine, cardiology, infectious diseases.gastro-enterology, haematology besides playing a major & key role in helping plan a brand new medical school, The School Of Medicine & Health Sciences of the University of Malaysia, Sarawak, which uses SGH as its teaching hospital. For his contribution the University appointed him adjunct Professor of Medicine till to date. In 2006 the Federal Government recognised his selfless contribution to medicine in Sarawak in particular & Malaysia in general conferred on him by the Agong ( the Malaysian King) the honorific of PJN which carries the title of Datuk.

Institute for Clinical Research (IRC), a research arm under the Malaysian Ministry of Health, established a Clinical Research Centre (CRC) in the hospital in 2003, the third establishment after the Penang General Hospital and Kuala Lumpur Hospital. Research facilities to conduct Phase I clinical trials was established in 2015.

== Teaching hospital ==
SGH serves as a teaching hospital for a wide field of medical and allied health personnel. The medical faculty of Universiti Malaysia Sarawak uses the hospital as a teaching hospital for its medical students.

SGH is also a popular place for elective attachment for medical students. Elective students from UK, Australia & New Zealand started to come regularly after 1987 when the department of medicine was headed by Dr Chew Peng Hong. Since then it has become a favourite elective destination for British medical students particularly from the London Medical schools, Newcastle, Leeds, Liverpool, Glasgow, Southampton, Hull & York, Peninsular as well as medical schools in Germany & Denmark. Nearer to home students from Australia & New Zealand, Hong Kong & Japan are coming in increasing numbers in addition to medical schools in Malaysia, both public & private. Much of the effort making it a popular institution are from the contribution of Dr Wong Jin Shyan (presently of Borneo Medical Center) & Professor Datuk Dr P.H. Chew, honorary consultant physician to the hospital & adjunct Professor of Medicine of the faculty of medicine & health sciences of the University of Malaysia Sarawak (UNIMAS).
