= Sungai Sarawak Regulation Scheme =

Kuching Barrage and Shiplock component of Sungai Sarawak Regulation Scheme
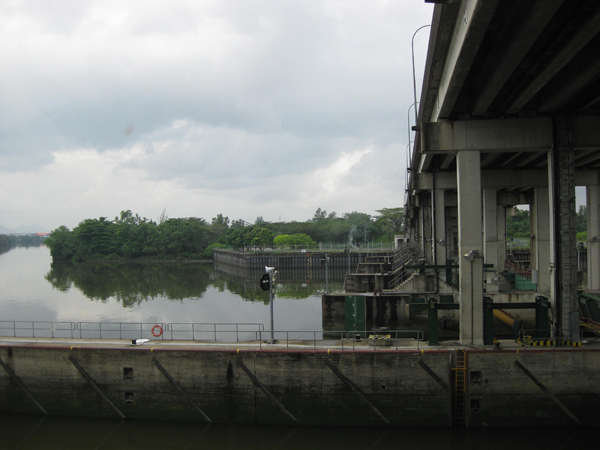
- View of barrage, shiplock and bridge from the Operations Room
- Interactive map of Kuching Barrage and Shiplock component of Sungai Sarawak Regulation Scheme
- Waterway: Sarawak River
- Country: Malaysia
- State: Sarawak
- Maintained by: Kuching Barrage Management Sdn. Bhd.
- Operation: Hydraulic
- First built: November 1997

The Sungai Sarawak Regulation Scheme (acronym SSRS) is a major civil engineering project in Kuching, Sarawak, Malaysia. This project incorporates a 3-in-1 infrastructure (barrage, shiplock and bridge) which is the first of its kind in Southeast Asia.

== History ==
The Sungai Sarawak basin area experience floods as a result of heavy rainfall from upstream, king tides, poor drainage, or a combination of these factors. In low-lying residential areas, floods occur every 1st and 15th day of the lunar calendar.

=== Design ===
The SSRS consists of:

1. Bako Causeway
2. Pending Causeway
3. Barrage & Shiplock (and a bridge over the barrage)
4. 24 units of rainfall & water telemetry stations

== Construction ==
The construction of the SSRS is divided into three phases,

=== Phase I ===
Phase I of the SSRS project is the construction of the Bako Causeway, the first causeway in Sarawak. The construction involved creating a rock-filled closure across Loba Santubong on Jalan Bako and was completed in August 1993.

=== Phase II ===
Phase II of the SSRS project is the construction of the main Barrage Facility (Kuching Barrage and Shiplock), comprising:

1. a barrage of five radial gates controlling the Sarawak River,
2. a 125m long by 25m wide shiplock, and
3. a 435m long four lane road bridge over both barrage and lock, linking the Demak Laut Industrial Park to the Kuching Isthmus.

The groundbreaking ceremony of the Barrage, Shiplock and Bridge was held on 25 July 1995 and graced by Abdul Taib Mahmud, the Chief Minister of Sarawak.

=== Phase III ===
The components of Phase III of the SSRS project are:

1. The Construction of the Pending Causeway, a rock fill dam across the Sarawak River at Jalan Keruing in Pending.
2. The Construction of a four lane road linking Pending with Sejingkat.
3. The Installation of a Telemetry System comprising 6 units of rainfall and water telemetry stations as an early warning device for the barrage operators.

The rainfall and water telemetry stations were installed at the following locations:

1. Kampung Sandong
2. Kampung Bengoh
3. Kampung Skio
4. Kampung Blinbim
5. Kampung Siburuh
6. Kampung Bogag

Phases II and III were constructed simultaneously and was completed in November 1997 at a cost of RM150 million.

The Kuching Barrage and Shiplock was officiated by Mahathir Mohamad, Prime Minister of Malaysia.

== Operation of Kuching Barrage and Shiplock ==
The barrage and shiplock is managed and operated by Kuching Barrage Management Sdn. Bhd., under the supervision of the Sarawak Rivers Board and is governed by The Sarawak Rivers (Sungai Sarawak Barrage) Regulations 1997, which states as follows:

to operate and maintain any barrage or shiplock, and regulate and control the passage of vessels through such barrage or shiplock, and to impose fees or tolls in such vessels passing through the same.

Real-time water and rainfall data is collected by the telemetry system and based on computational model of the Sarawak River. The predicted discharge and water level are the two main factors in deciding when to operate the barrage gates. All data collection and information will be processed by a sophisticated river analysis software known as MIKE-II.
