= Chicken chop =

Malaysian-style fried chicken dish

- Chicken chop served with french fries and coleslaw
- Course: Main course, usually for lunch and dinner
- Place of origin: Malaysia
- Created by: Hainanese migrants
- Main ingredients: Fried chicken, paired with french fries, salad and/or rice

Chicken chop is a dish invented by Hainanese migrant workers during the colonial Malaya period. The dish is a local adaptation of fried and grilled chicken, often found in Malaysian kopitiams and restaurants specialising in Hainanese cuisine or western cuisine.

== History ==
Hainanese migrant workers, who primarily worked as cooks for British colonial officers, developed chicken chop as a fusion dish that combined Western culinary influences with Malaysian ingredients and cooking techniques. While it may sound similar to the American chicken fried steak (which actually uses beefsteak), chicken chop differs in its way of cooking and choice of sides and gravy. The dish is traditionally served with black pepper sauce or a Hainanese-style brown sauce (based on tomato ketchup, A1 or Worcestershire sauce, soy sauce, and a thickening agent), accompanied by a side of fries and vegetables usually in the form of salad or coleslaw.

== Preparation ==
Chicken chop is typically made using a deboned chicken thigh or a flattened chicken breast. The chicken is either breaded or marinated and then deep-fried (for breaded chicken chop) or pan-fried (for marinated chicken chop, often named chicken chop grill or just chicken grill), then served with brown gravy. The gravy is often made from a premixed powder or a blend of sauces, giving it a savoury and slightly tangy flavor. The dish can also be a side dish served with other dishes such as nasi lemak or nasi goreng.

== Misconceptions ==
Despite its Western appearance, chicken chop is not commonly found in Western countries. Many Malaysians mistakenly believe it to be an imported Western dish, but it is, in fact, a local creation that has been a staple in Malaysian cuisine for decades. (Confer yōshoku for similar locally-invented, Western-influenced dishes in Japanese cuisine.)

== Gallery ==
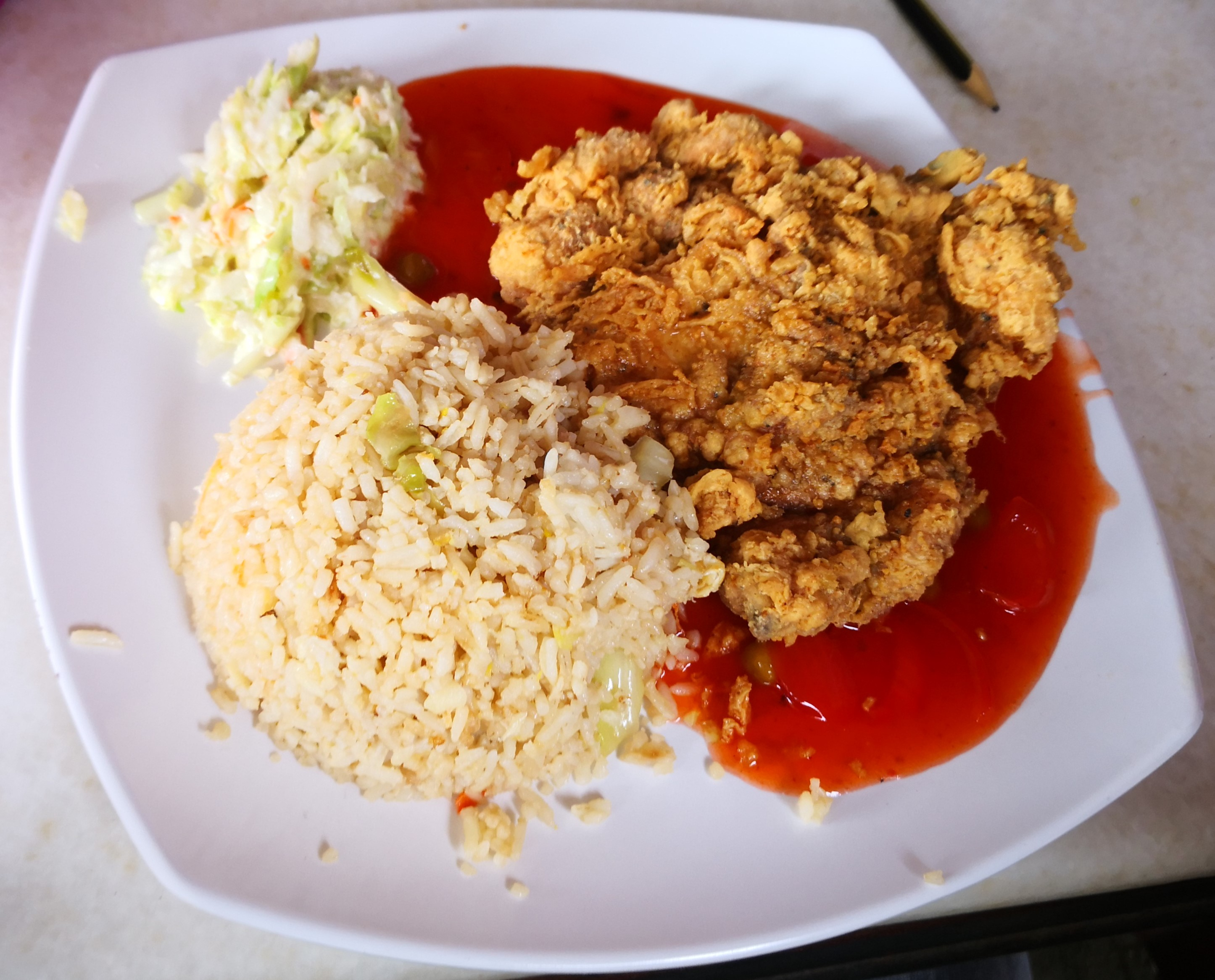
Fried chicken chop with rice

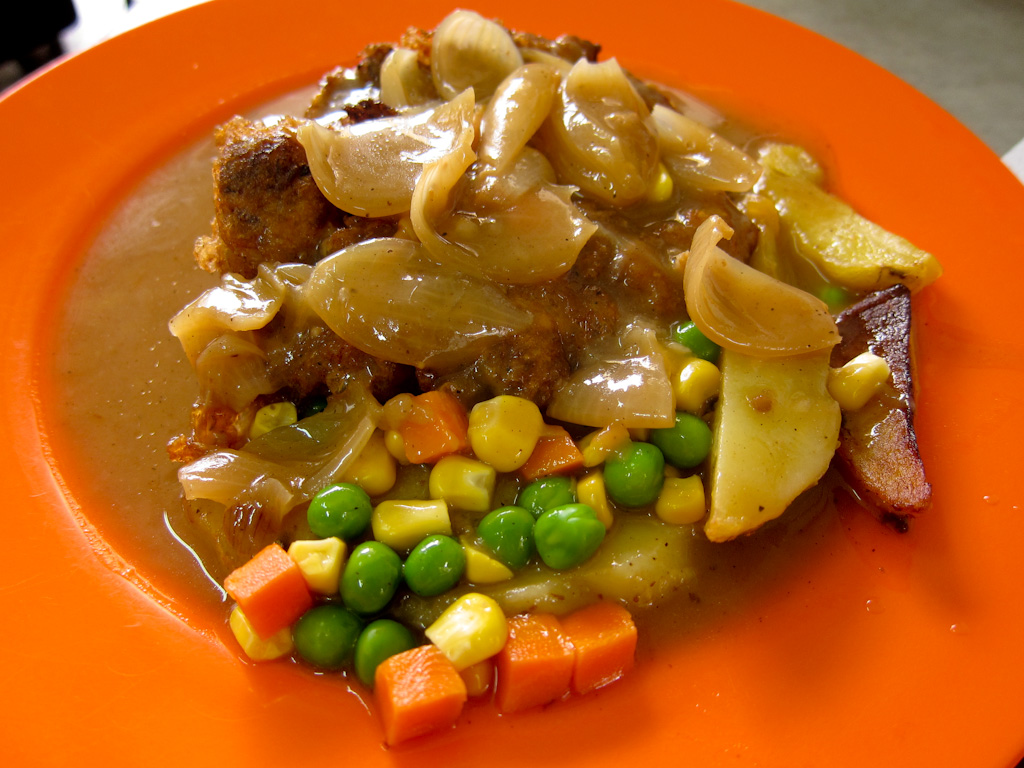
Chicken chop with mushroom gravy and mixed vegetables

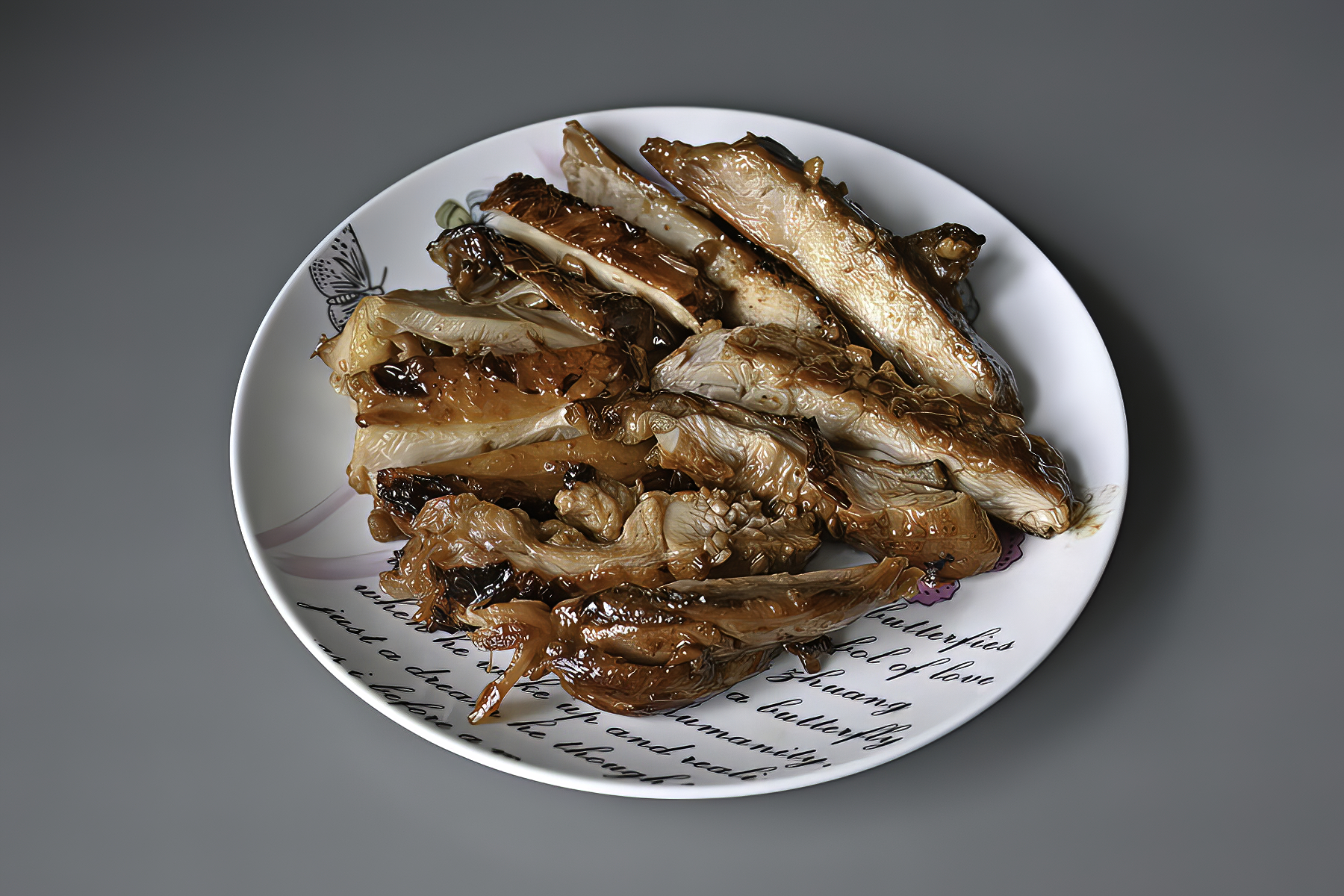
Sliced chicken chop

== See also ==
- List of Malaysian dishes
- Chicken katsu
- Schnitzel
