= Kota Samarahan =

Kota Samarahan Muara Tuang
- Town and district capital
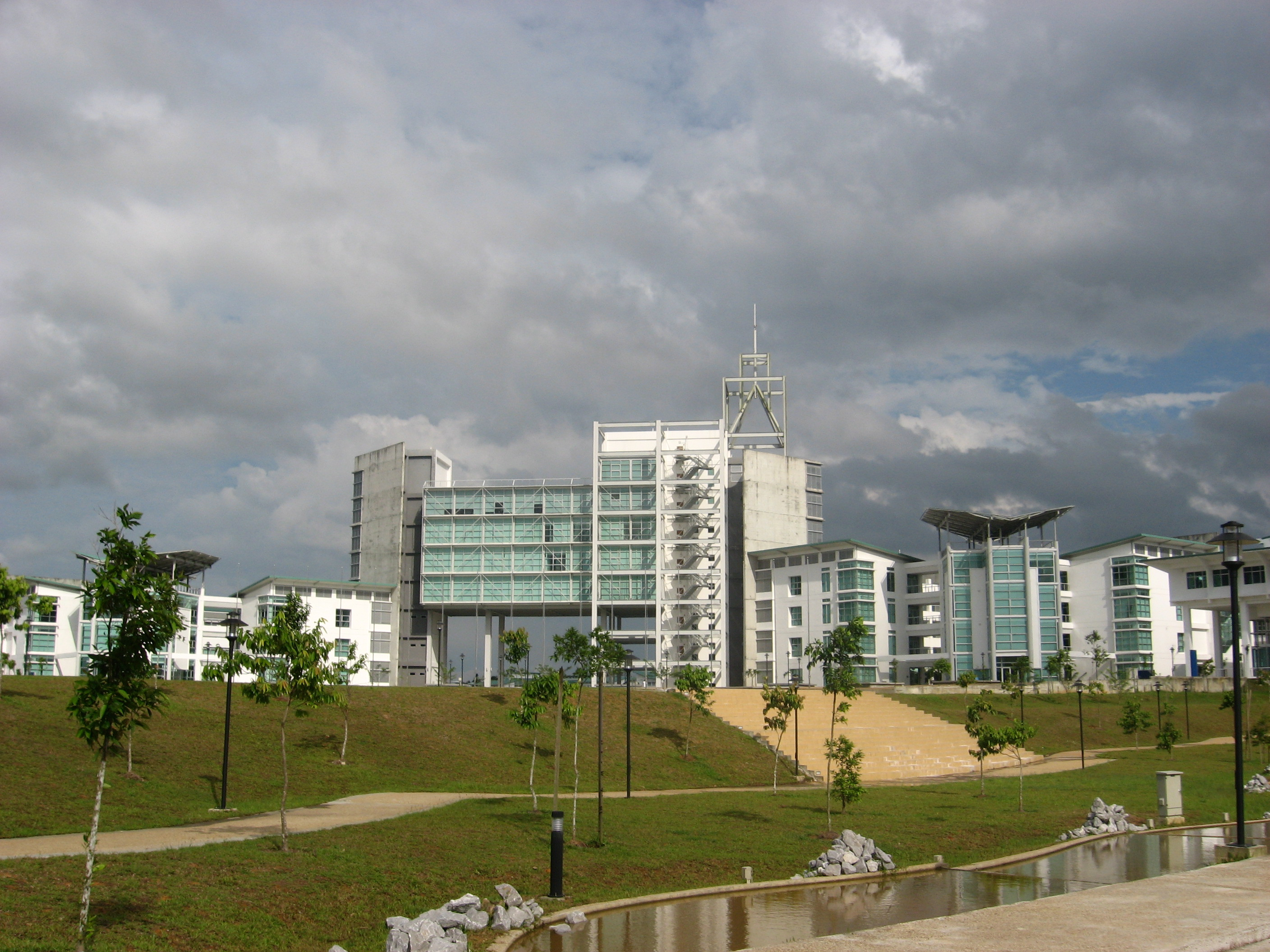
- Unimas administrative building and Unimas square.

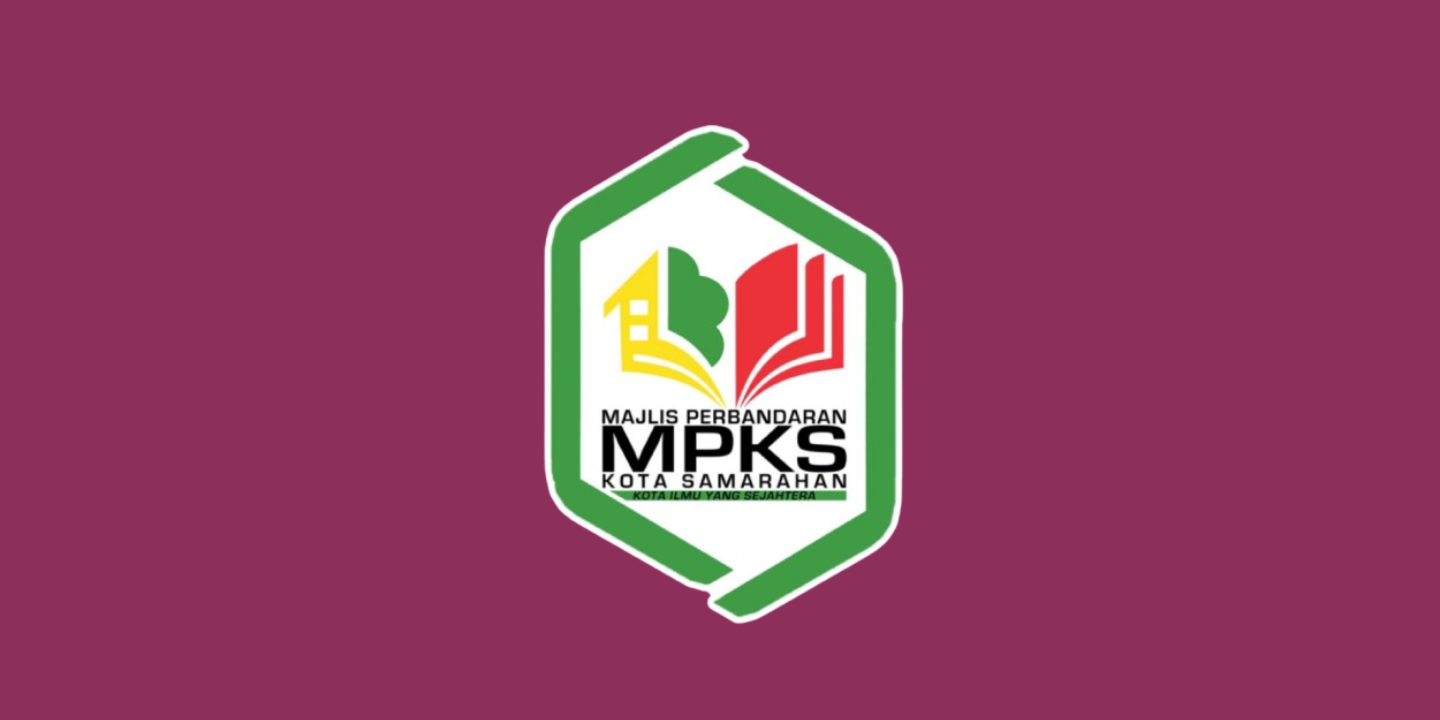
- Flag Seal
- Nickname: Kota Ilmu (Town of Knowledge)
- Motto(s): Kota Ilmu Yang Sejahtera (Prosperous Town of Knowledge)
- Interactive map of Kota Samarahan
- Kota Samarahan in Malaysia Kota Samarahan (Malaysia) Kota Samarahan (Asia) Kota Samarahan (Earth)
- Coordinates: 1°27′34″N 110°29′56″E
- Country: Malaysia
- State: Sarawak
- Division: Samarahan
- District: Samarahan
- Establishment: 1800s (as Muara Tuang); 19 August 1983 (as Kota Samarahan)
- Municipality status: 11 November 2016

Government
  - Type: Municipality
  - Body: Kota Samarahan Municipal Council
  - Chairman: Dato Peter Minos

Area
  - Kota Samarahan: 407 km^{2} (157 sq mi)
- Elevation: 27 m (89 ft)
- Highest elevation: 810.2 m (2,658 ft)
- Lowest elevation: 0 m (0 ft)

Population (2024)
  - Kota Samarahan: 29,395
  - Density: 72.2/km^{2} (187/sq mi)
- Sourced from the Population and Housing Census of Malaysia 2020.
- Demonym: (none)
- Time zone: UTC+8 (MST)
  - Summer (DST): UTC+8 (Not observed)
- Postal code: 94300
- International dialling code prefix: +6082 (landline only)
- Vehicle registration plate prefix: QC (for all vehicles except taxis); HQ (for taxis only)
- Website: mpks.sarawak.gov.my

Kota Samarahan, formerly known as Muara Tuang, is a town and the administrative seat of the Samarahan District in Samarahan Division, Sarawak, Malaysia. It is also a satellite town for Kuching due to its proximity to the city part of Greater Kuching area. The Sarawak government position Kota Samarahan as the medical and education hub of the state. Kota Samarahan can be considered as the 'heart' of Malay/Muslims in Sarawak (in addition to Kuching) which forms approximately over 54% of the population, thus make it as another "Putrajaya" version of Sarawak.

The Kota Samarahan Municipal Council (MPKS) exercises local authority over Samarahan and Asajaya districts, as well as Sadong Jaya subdistrict.

As of 2024, the Kota Samarahan town has a total population of 29,395, and the population of all towns managed by Kota Samarahan Municipal Council is 76,940.

== Etymology ==
Samarahan District was known as Muara Tuang subdistrict and the town as "Muara Tuang" under the administration of Kuching Division before 1983. On 19 August 1983, Muara Tuang was elevated to a district status together with a name change to "Samarahan District". At the same time, the town in Samarahan District was also renamed to "Kota Samarahan". On 24 July 1986, Samarahan Division was created by combining the Samarahan, Serian, and Simunjan districts together.

Kota Samarahan is known as Kota Ilmu (town of knowledge) after the first public university in Sarawak, the Universiti Malaysia Sarawak (UNIMAS) established in 1992.

== History ==
The Samarahan area became an important part of the Bruneian Empire as a trading port in 1364 during the reign of the king Awang alak Betatar (who later changed his name to Sultan Muhamad after adopting Islam). In 1853, Samarahan lost its importance along with Sadong areas when the areas were ceded to James Brooke by Sultan Omar Ali Saiffudin II in an agreement which also recognize James Brooke as Raja of Sarawak. In return, James Brooke had to pay 1500 dollars to the Sultanate as cession money. Since the cession, Samarahan officially broke its relations with the Brunei Sultanate. The cession money was increased to 4500 dollars per year after 1861.

== Geography ==
Kota Samarahan is a suburb of the greater metropolitan area of Kuching. It is located about 30 km south east of Kuching. The lands in Samarahan District are flat and consists of lowland and peat soil.

=== Climate ===
Kota Samarahan has a tropical rainforest climate (Af) with heavy to very heavy rainfall year-round.

Climate data for Kota Samarahan
Month	Jan	Feb	Mar	Apr	May	Jun	Jul	Aug	Sep	Oct	Nov	Dec	Year
Mean daily maximum °C (°F)	29.7 (85.5)	29.9 (85.8)	31.0 (87.8)	32.0 (89.6)	32.4 (90.3)	32.2 (90.0)	32.1 (89.8)	32.1 (89.8)	31.7 (89.1)	31.6 (88.9)	31.3 (88.3)	30.6 (87.1)	31.4 (88.5)
Daily mean °C (°F)	26.1 (79.0)	26.2 (79.2)	26.9 (80.4)	27.5 (81.5)	27.8 (82.0)	27.6 (81.7)	27.3 (81.1)	27.4 (81.3)	27.1 (80.8)	27.1 (80.8)	26.9 (80.4)	26.6 (79.9)	27.0 (80.7)
Mean daily minimum °C (°F)	22.6 (72.7)	22.6 (72.7)	22.8 (73.0)	23.0 (73.4)	23.3 (73.9)	23.0 (73.4)	22.6 (72.7)	22.7 (72.9)	22.6 (72.7)	22.7 (72.9)	22.6 (72.7)	22.6 (72.7)	22.8 (73.0)
Average rainfall mm (inches)	578 (22.8)	447 (17.6)	314 (12.4)	280 (11.0)	248 (9.8)	198 (7.8)	189 (7.4)	235 (9.3)	269 (10.6)	319 (12.6)	349 (13.7)	474 (18.7)	3,900 (153.7)
Source: Climate-Data.org

== Demographics ==
Ethnic composition of Kota Samarahan (2024)
Ethnicities / Nationality	Percentage
Malays	54.07%
Iban	28.2%
Bidayuh	2.5%
Melanau	0.31%
Other Bumiputeras	0.02%
Chinese	12.87%
Indians	0.01%
Others	0.02%
Non-Malaysian	2%

Ethnicity	2024	
Ethnicity	Pop.	%
Malays	15894	54.07%
Iban	8290	28.2%
Bidayuh	736	2.5%
Melanau	91	0.31%
Other Bumiputeras	5	0.02%
Chinese	3782	12.87%
Indians	4	0.01%
Others	6	0.02%
Malaysian total	28808	98%
Non-Malaysian	587	2%
Total	29395	100.00%

Historical population
Year	Pop.	±%
1995	7,634	—
2004	10,951	+43.5%
2010	12,724	+16.2%
2015	18,673	+46.8%
2024	29,395	+57.4%

== Government ==
Kota Samarahan Municipal Council was set up in 2016 to administer Kota Samarahan including its surrounding areas such as Asajaya and Sadong Jaya districts. Samarahan Divisional Resident Office was built after the Samarahan district was declared a division in 1986.

== Economy activities ==
Due to the vast availability of lowlands in the district, Malaysian federal government started Integrated Agricultural Development Area (IADA) in Samarahan since 1986. Amongst the crops planted are sweet lime, coconut, oil palm, and pineapple. Amongst the cash crops that are planted are: paddy rice, watermelon, sweet corn, and vegetables. This programme helps in poverty reduction from 77% in 1986 to 19.5% in 2005 by using poverty line income (PLI) of RM 765 (US$201.3) per month based on Ninth Malaysia Plan in 2006. As of 2006, 40% of the average household income in this area was RM 1440. Assuming a yearly income growth rate of 3%, all the farmers in the IADA area would come above the PLI by 2022.

There is a mini industrial estate near Tanjung Bundong village.

Sarawak Land Consolidation and Rehabilitation Authority (SALCRA) set up its headquarters in Kota Samarahan.

Kota Samarahan also actively in other economic sectors such as education, healthcare, retail & wholesale business, financial & monetary, Sarawak digital economy sector, green economy sector, online business, social and welfare activities, sports, product innovation activities, and architectural technology.

== Transportation ==
=== Local Bus ===
Route No.	Operating Route	Operator
3AB	Kuching-Serian	BusAsia
K10	Kuching-Kota Samarahan	CPL
10A	Kuching-Kota Samarahan	BusAsia
10AC	Kuching-Kota Samarahan	BusAsia
K12	Kuching-Kota Samarahan-Asajaya-Sadong Jaya	CPL

Prior to 1990, the shortest means of access into Samarahan from Kuching was via a ferry at Sungai Kuap other than direct road access from Jalan Datuk Muhamad Musa which takes longer. The construction of a bridge has further shortened the road distance from between Kuching-Kota Samarahan to 11 kilometers. This new road, officially known as Kuching-Kota Samarahan Expressway, links Kota Samarahan with the major industrial areas of Pending, Demak Laut and Sama Jaya. This new road is currently undergoing some expansion in anticipation of increased traffic between Kuching-Samarahan due to the increasing population in Samarahan.

== Other utilities ==
=== Education ===
Universiti Malaysia Sarawak was established in December 1992 with two faculties namely the Faculty of Social Science and the Faculty of Resource Science and Technology. In 1994, more faculties were added, including the Faculty of Cognitive Sciences and Human Development, the Faculty of Applied and Creative Arts, and the Faculty of Engineering. In 1995, the Faculty of Medicine and Health Sciences was set up, followed by the Faculty of Economics and Business in 1996.

Universiti Teknologi MARA Kota Samarahan branch was given 883 acres of land to develop its campus. As of 2013, Campus 2 was built next to its old Campus 1.

Teachers' training institute Tun Abdul Razak campus was built in November 1999.

INTAN Sarawak campus moved from Kuching to Kota Samarahan in August 2011. It serves as a training centre for government servants in customer service and administration.

Kota Samarahan Industrial Training Institute (ILPKS) was established in 1999, by Department of Manpower under the Ministry of Human Resources. It provides vocational training for manufacturing sector.

=== Medical facilities ===
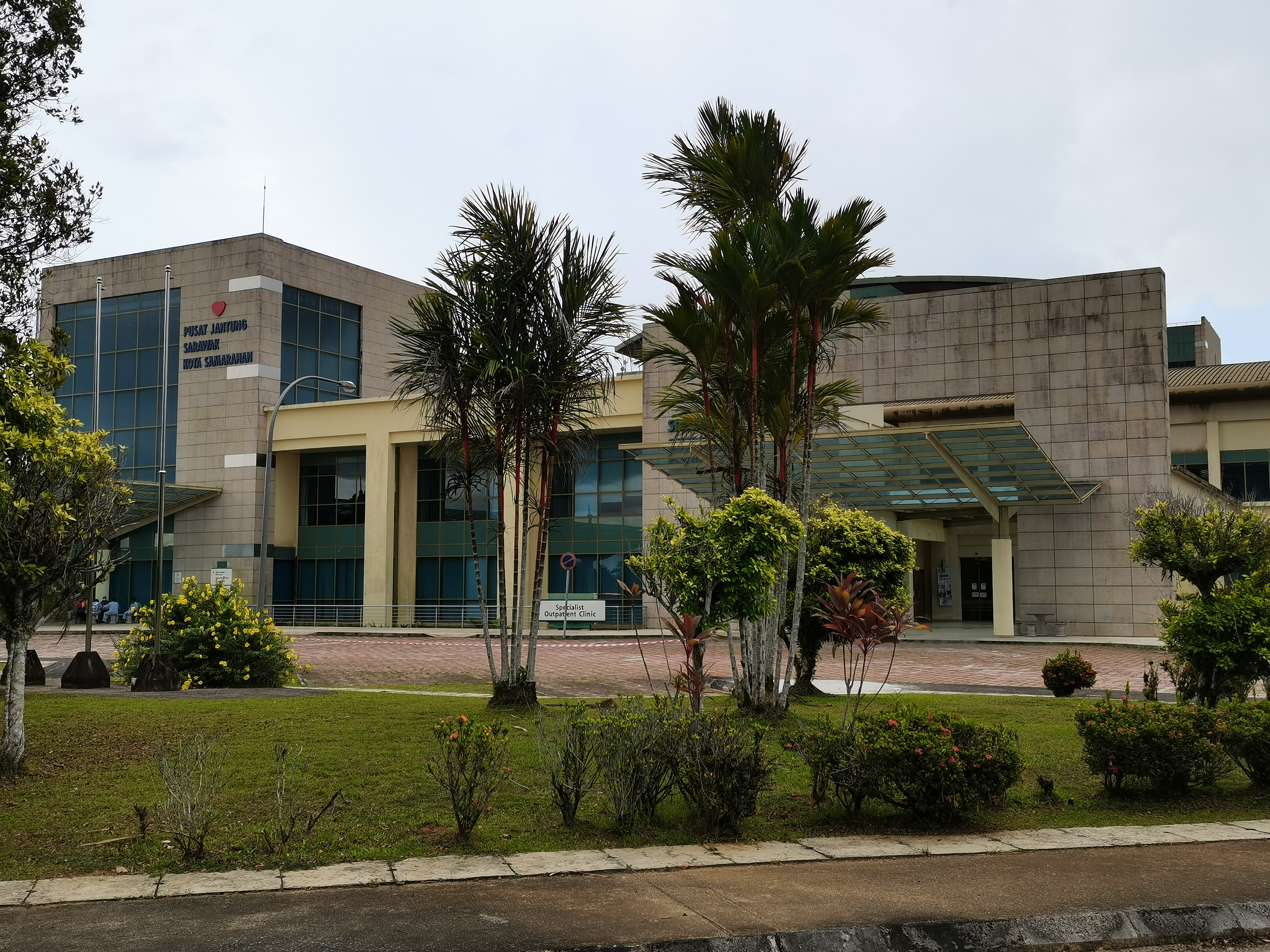
Sarawak Heart Centre main building.

Sarawak General Hospital Heart Centre was set up in 2011 in Kota Samarahan, incorporating the department of cardiology from Sarawak General Hospital due to space constraints. In 2015, the centre is known as "Sarawak Heart Centre" after it was given administrative autonomy by the government of Malaysia.

Kota Samarahan public health clinic is located 15 km away from Sarawak Heart Centre.

== Leisure and conservation areas ==
=== Retail ===
Building upon the entries of tertiary educational institutions, Sarawak Heart Centre, and large businesses in Kota Samarahan, the first shopping mall named the "Summer Mall" was opened in 2013. This was followed by Aiman Mall in 2017, being the first suburban mall in Samarahan with retail space of over 140,000 square feet. La Promenade Mall was opened in 2021, as part of the Hock Seng Lee (a construction company based in Sarawak) office tower located along the Kuching-Samarahan expressway. The mall mainly caters to the La Promenade's luxury gated residential community developed by Hock Seng Lee.
