= Universiti Malaysia Sarawak =

Public university in Kota Samarahan

Coordinates: 1°27′53″N 110°25′33″E

- Universiti Malaysia Sarawak
- Official seal
- Motto: Community-Driven University for a Sustainable World
- Type: Public
- Established: 24 December 1992; 33 years ago
- Academic affiliations: Association of Southeast Asian Institutions of Higher Learning (ASAIHL)
- Chancellor: TYT Tun Pehin Sri Wan Junaidi Tuanku Jaafar (Governor of Sarawak)
- Vice-Chancellor: Prof. Dr. Ahmad Hata Rasit (2024-Present)
- Location: Jln Datuk Mohammad Musa, 94300, Kota Samarahan, Sarawak, Malaysia
- Campus: Kota Samarahan (main campus), Kuching and Sibu (branch campus)
- Website: www.unimas.my

Universiti Malaysia Sarawak (UNIMAS) is a Malaysian public university located in Kota Samarahan, Sarawak. UNIMAS was officially incorporated on 24 December 1992. The QS World University Rankings ranked UNIMAS 226th in Asia in 2025.

The university took in its first students, numbering 118, in 1993 with the opening of the Faculty of Social Sciences and the Faculty of Resource Science and Technology. These students were temporarily located at Telekom Training College, Simpang Tiga, Kuching, until 1994, when the university moved to its East Campus in Kota Samarahan, Sarawak. The university's East Campus at Kota Samarahan was officially launched by the Prime Minister, Mahathir Mohamad on Independence Day, 31 August 1993.

At present, the university consists of 11 faculties, 7 institutes and 35 centres. The Faculty of Law is the latest faculty to be established recently in 2025 and situated at UNIMAS Business School (UNIMAS City Campus) in Kuching, Sarawak.

UNIMAS was awarded an MS ISO 9001: 2008 quality certificate by SIRIM QAS International Sdn. Bhd. and IQNet on 13 May 2010 for its core management process at the Undergraduate Studies Division (BPPs) and Centre for Academic Information Services (CAIS).

UNIMAS has implemented and maintains an Information Security Management System (ISMS) that fulfils the requirements of ISO/IEC 27001:2005 and MS ISO/IEC 27001:2007 standards. The scope covers the areas for the management of UNIMAS Data Centre, covering equipment, system software, databases, and operating systems for the university's critical applications. The certification was issued to UNIMAS on 27 September 2013.

An international competition was held for the master plan design of the permanent campus. The winning design for the proposed new university was by Peter Verity (PDRc), the international architect and city planner, who, after detailed environmental analysis chose the present site for the Main Campus. The objective of the plan was to create an environmentally sustainable urban campus that, in the manner of Louvain-la-Neuve, would form the centre of a significant university new town. The interface between the fresh water and saltwater systems of the site is expected to give the opportunity to create a biodiversity of considerable richness.

The opening of the new Main Campus by Prime Minister Dato' Seri (now Tun) Abdullah Haji Ahmad Badawi on 18 April 2006 was witnessed by 10,000 students, staff and members of the public. The event was also broadcast live over RTM1.

In 2015, the university was granted autonomy status.

== Research ==
UNIMAS commitment to research has already been recognised by the stakeholders and partners in industry through the provision of endowments for the establishment of eight research chairs; these include the Tun Zaidi Chair for Medicinal Chemistry, the Tun Openg Chair for Sago Technology, the Shell Chair for Environmental Studies, and the Sapura Chair for ICT. Today, UNIMAS’ research is focused on three niche areas of research:

- Biodiversity and Environmental Conservation
- Information Communication and Creative Technology
- Sustainable Community Transformation

== Students' Union ==
The UNIMAS Student Representative Council (Malay: Majlis Perwakilan Pelajar UNIMAS or MPP UNIMAS) is the student representative body for students at the University Malaysia Sarawak, Malaysia. It is the ultimate legislative body among the students. A general election is held every year to elect representatives to the Student Representative Council.

== Rankings ==
Year	Rank	Valuer
2012	161-170	QS Asian University Rankings
2013	181-190	QS Asian University Rankings
2014	201-250	QS Asian University Rankings
2015	201	QS Asian University Rankings
2016	251	QS Asian University Rankings
2017	251-300	QS Asian University Rankings
2018	247	QS Asian University Rankings
2019	236	QS Asian University Rankings
2020	243	QS Asian University Rankings
2021	251-260	QS Asian University Rankings
2025	=226	QS Asian University Rankings

== Gallery ==
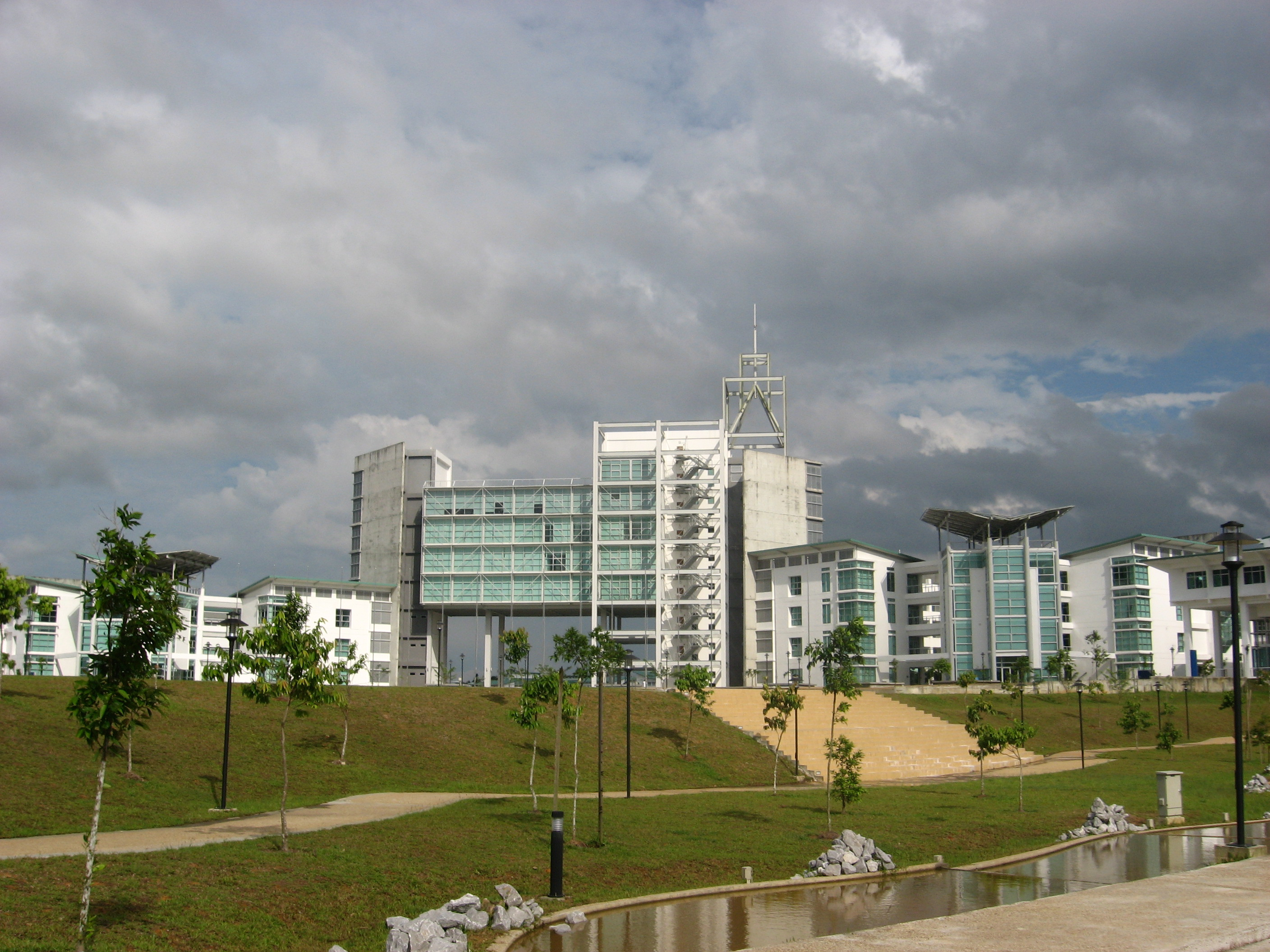
Unimas administrative building and Unimas square.

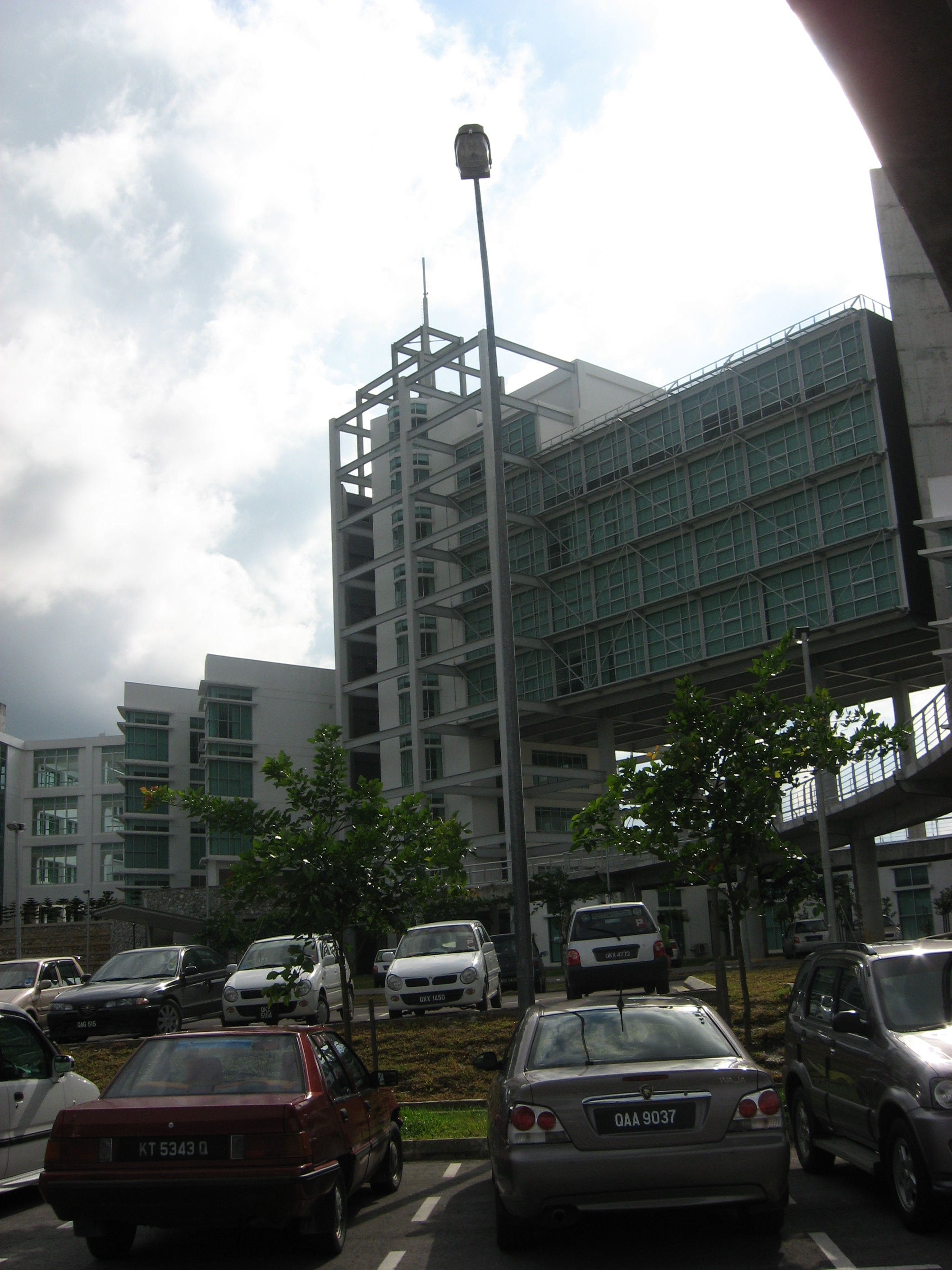
Chancellory.

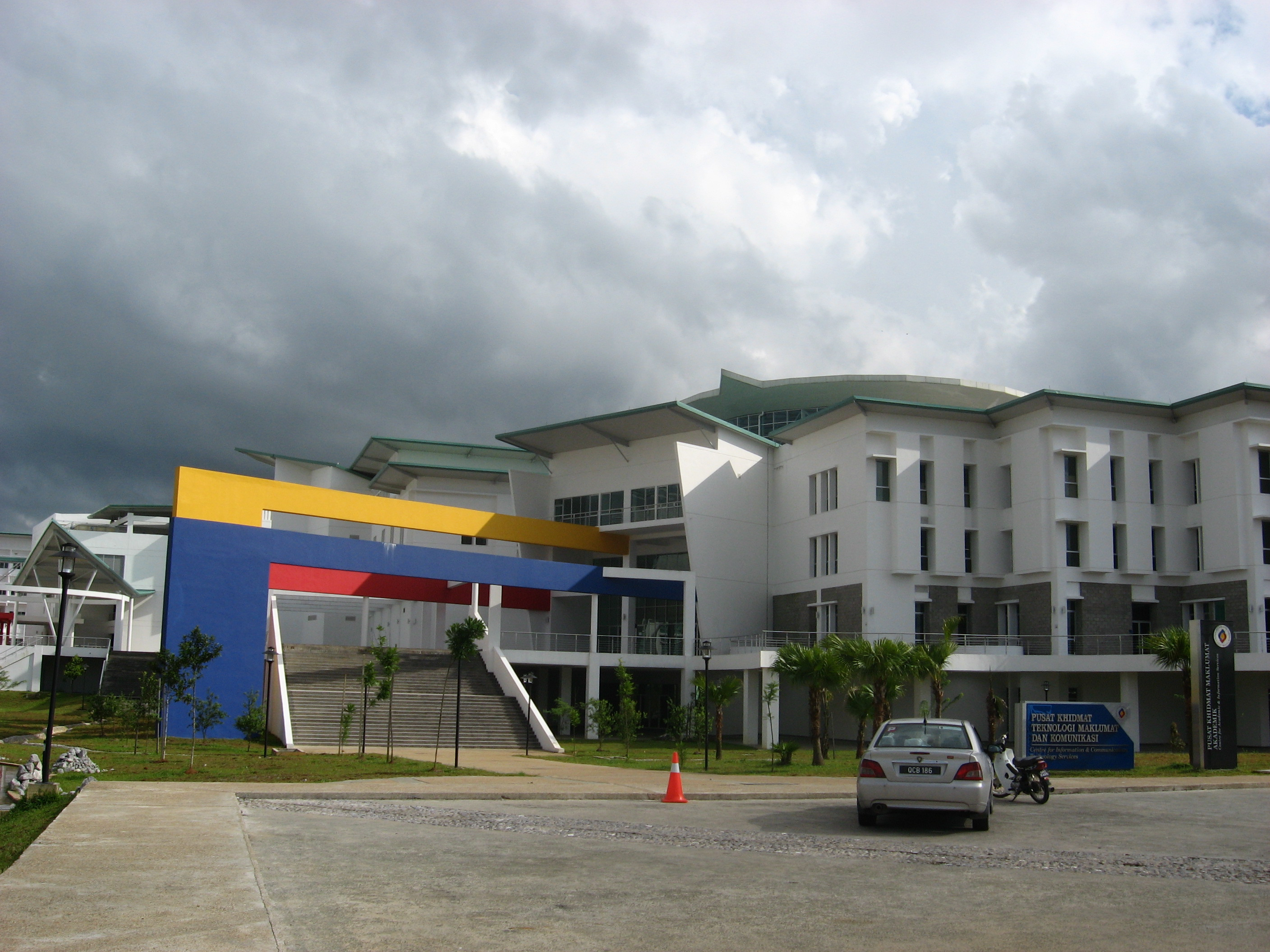
Unimas library.

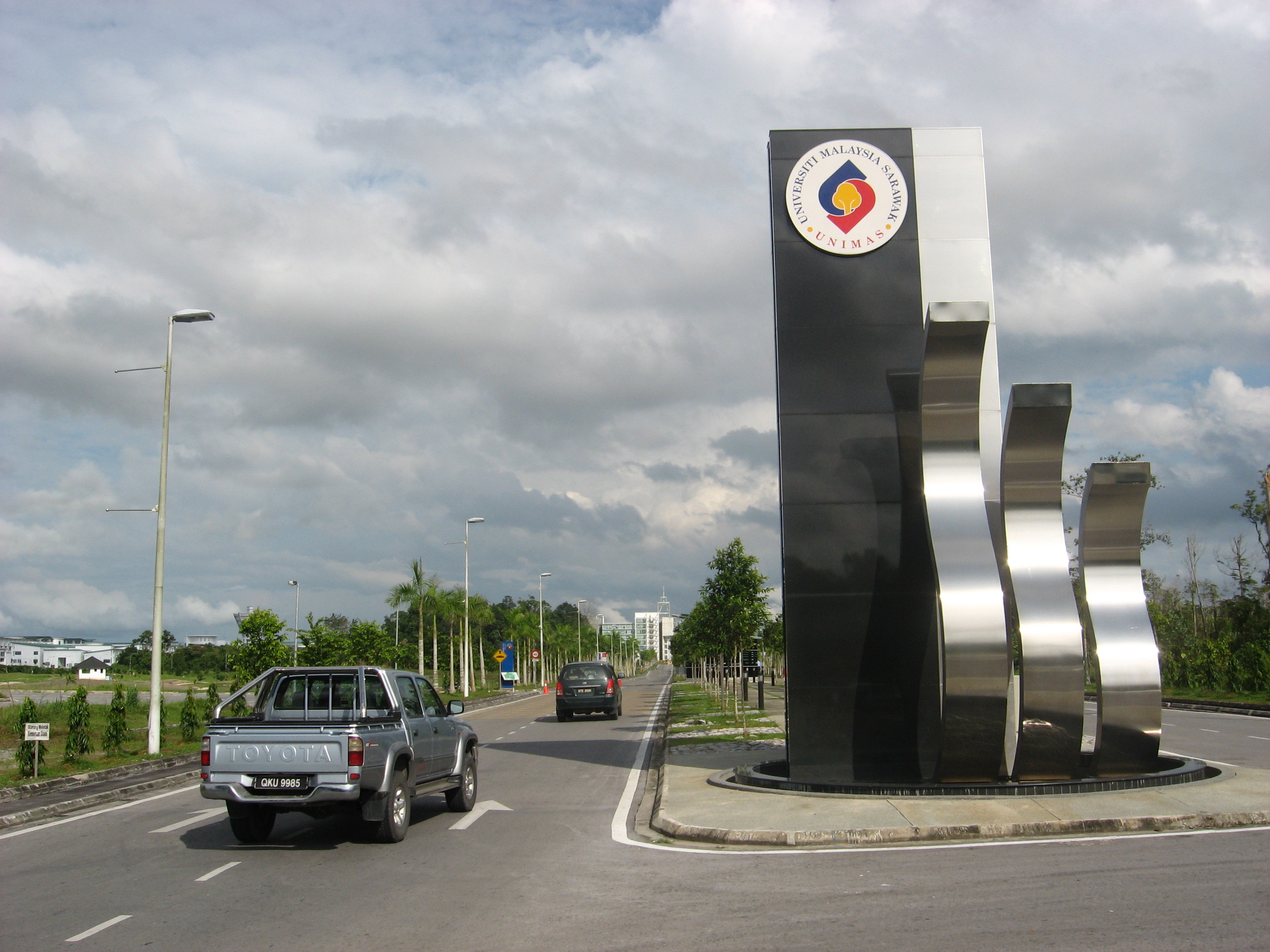
Unimas main entrance.

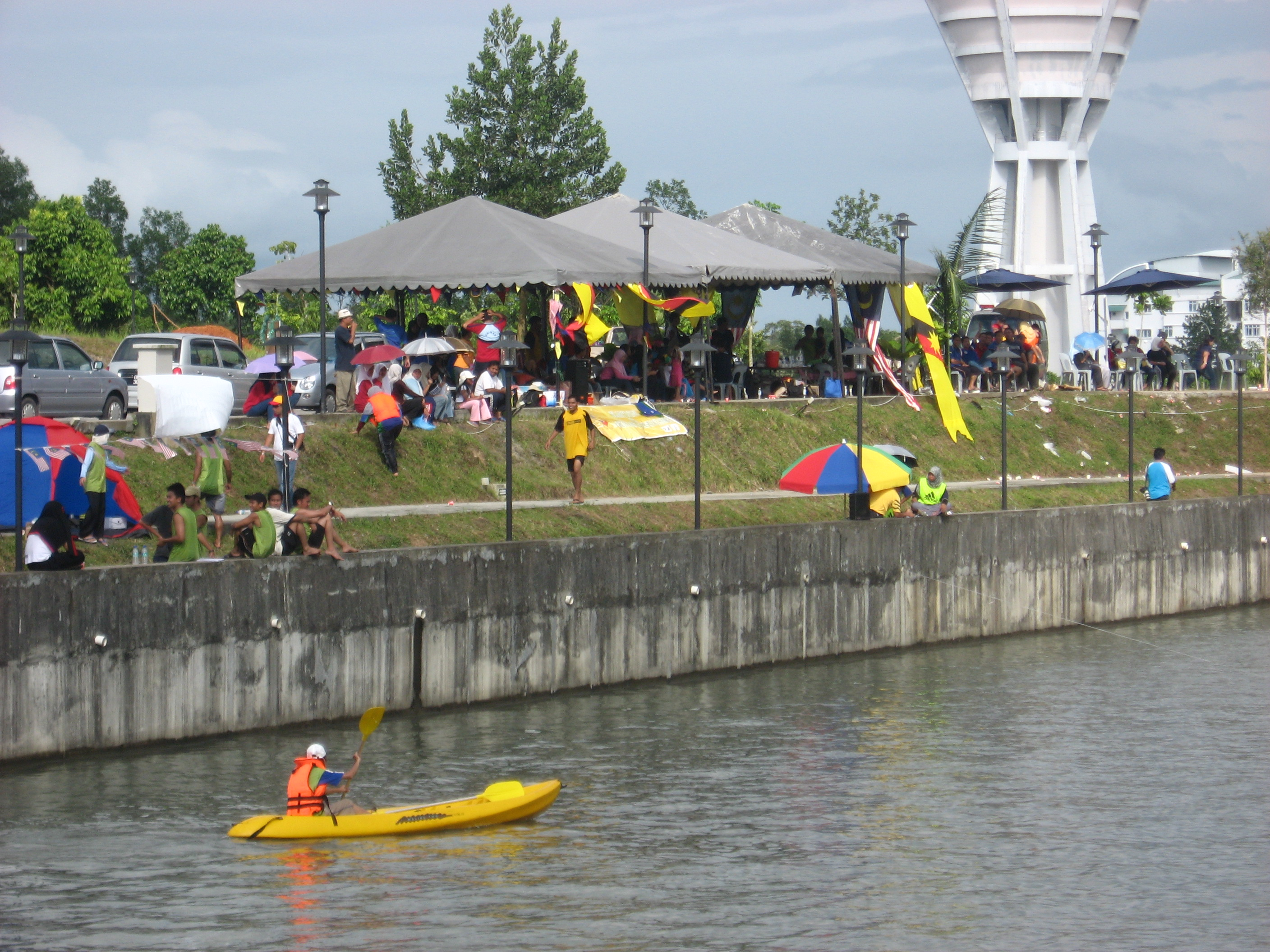
Water sport day.

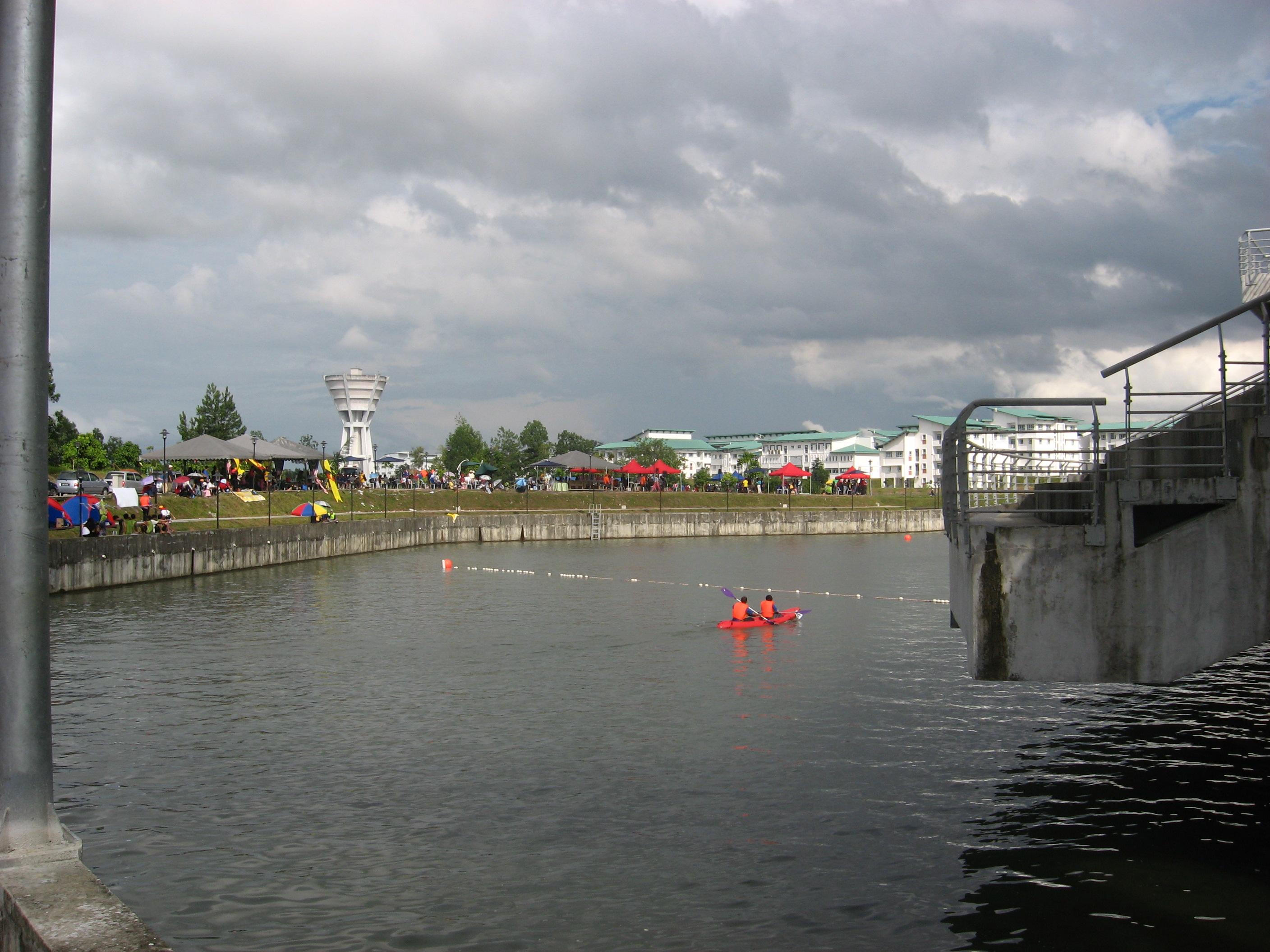
Unimas lakeside.

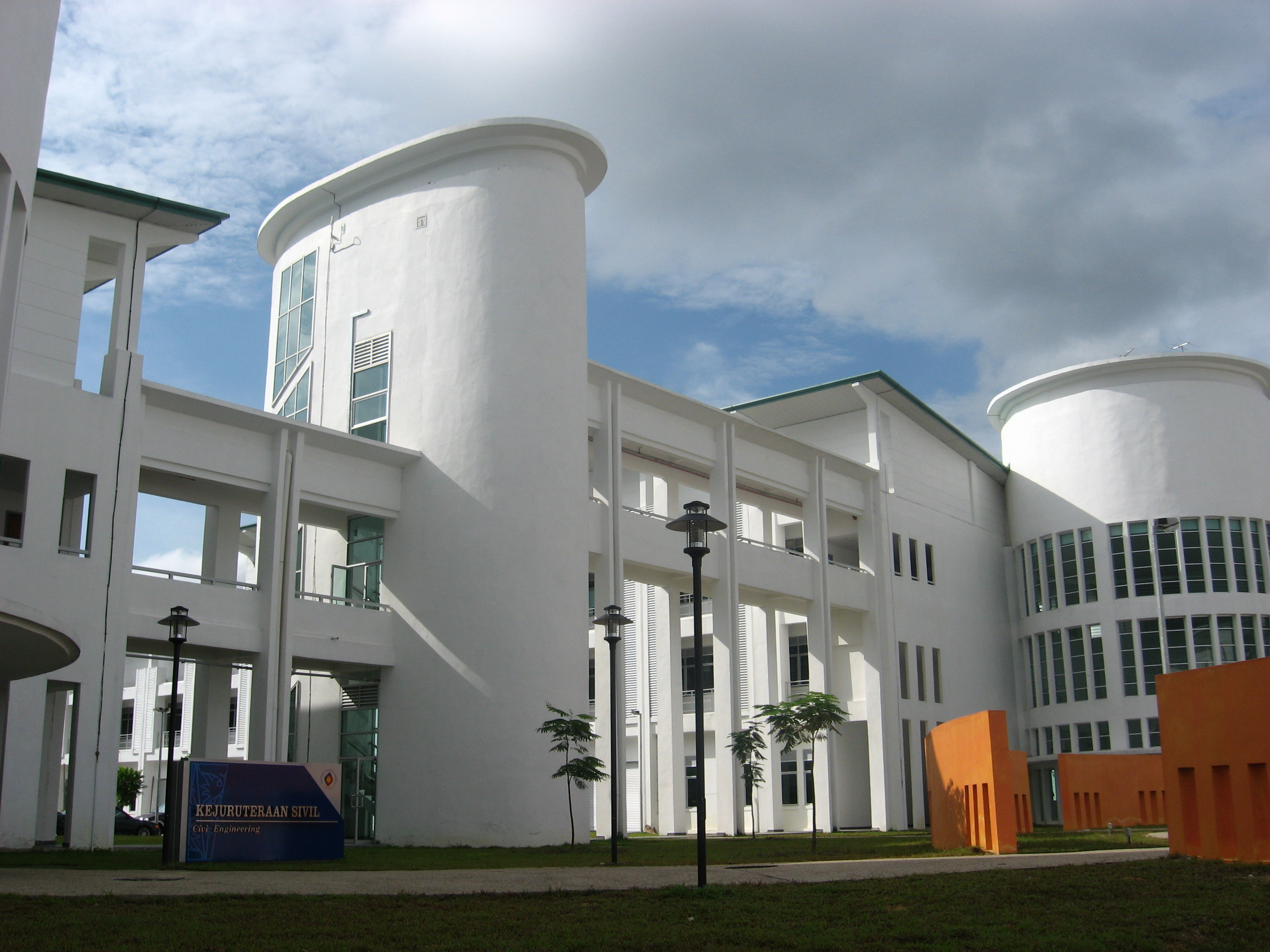
Engineering Faculty.

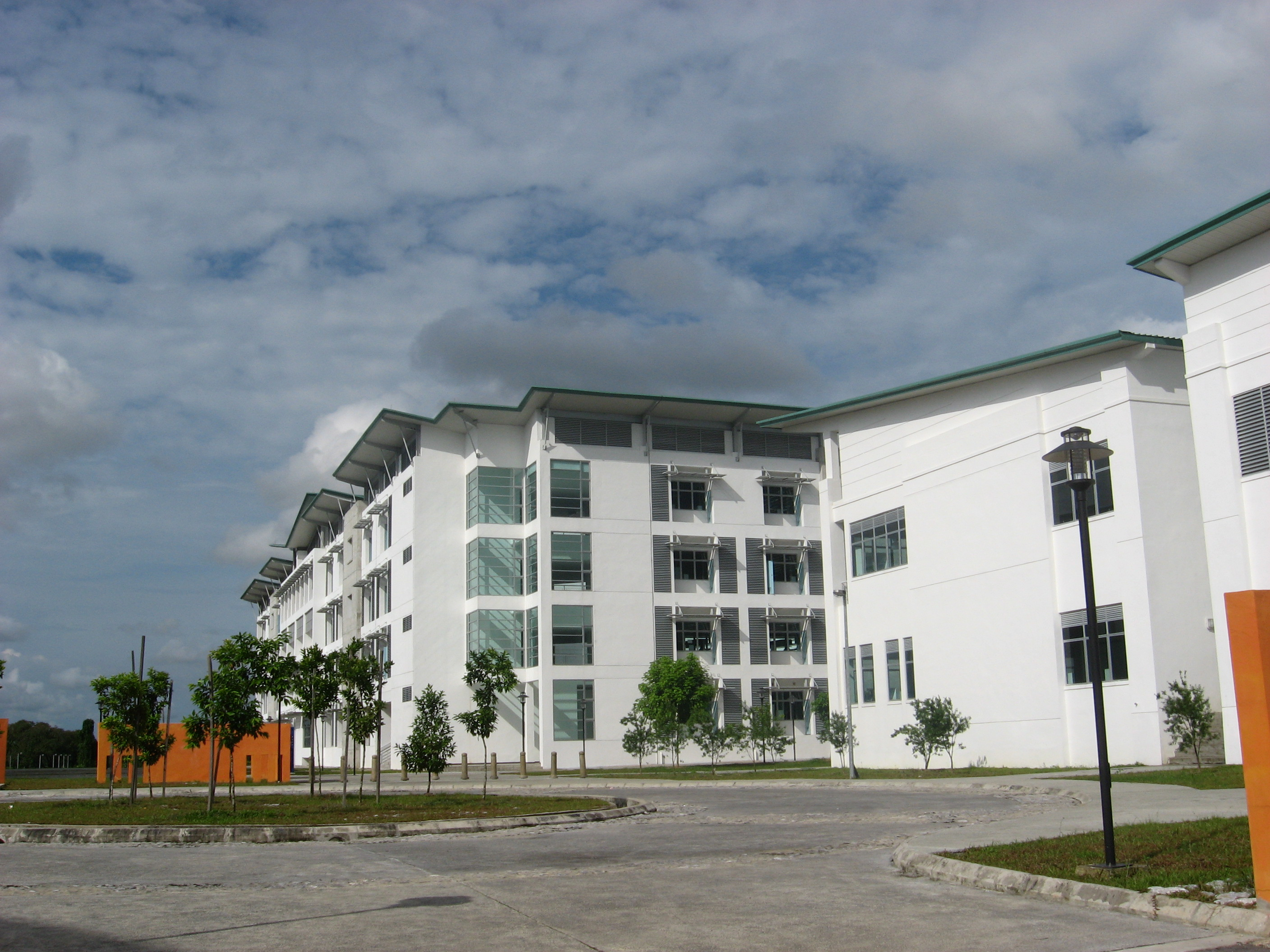
Faculty of Resource Science and Technology.

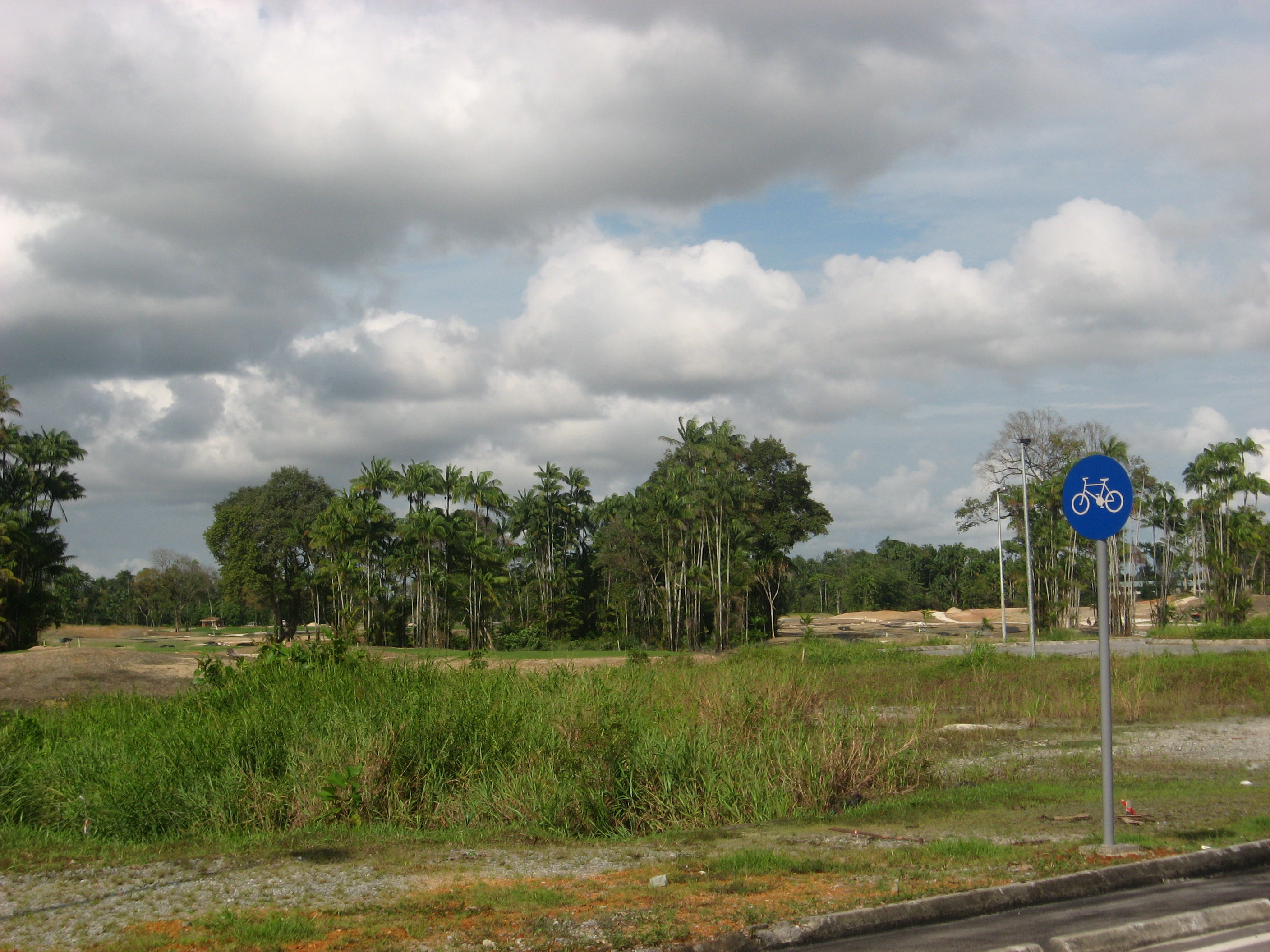
Bicycle lane and golf course in the background.

== See also ==
- List of forestry universities and colleges
- List of universities in Malaysia
