= List of deputy premiers of Sarawak =

The deputy premier, previously known as the deputy chief minister until 28 February 2022, is the second-highest-ranking officer in the executive branch of the Sarawak government after the premier of Sarawak.

There have been 14 Sarawak deputy premiers since the office was created in 1963. There are currently three incumbent deputy premiers: Douglas Uggah Embas, who has served since 13 May 2016; Awang Tengah Ali Hasan, who has served since 6 May 2017; and Sim Kui Hian, who has served since 4 January 2022. Alfred Jabu Numpang is the longest-serving holder of the office, having served for more than 41 years before retiring in 2016. James Jemut Masing is the only officeholder to have died in office.

The composition of the deputy chief ministership has changed over time. In the early period of self-government, deputy chief ministers were appointed from among leaders of the major political parties in the governing coalition and included representatives of different ethnic communities in Sarawak. The office of chief minister has been held by politicians of Melanau or Malay background since Tawi Sli succeeded Stephen Kalong Ningkan in 1966, with the exception of Ningkan's tenure from 1963 to 1966.

Following the 2011 state election, the Sarawak United Peoples' Party (SUPP) lost several urban constituencies, including the seat held by then-deputy chief minister II and SUPP president George Chan Hong Nam. Following the election, Chief Minister Taib Mahmud appointed Alfred Jabu Numpang as the sole deputy chief minister. The office remained without a Chinese representative during the administration of Taib's successor, Adenan Satem.

In December 2021, Abang Abdul Rahman Zohari appointed Sim Kui Hian as deputy chief minister III, with the appointment taking effect in January 2022. This restored Chinese representation among the deputy chief ministers. Sim Kheng Hong and Sim Kui Hian are the first and only father-son pair to have held the office to date.

The deputy premier is 12th in the order of precedence, which determines the ceremonial ranking of government officials and other dignitaries at diplomatic, ceremonial and social events within Sarawak.

== Deputy premiers ==
List of deputy premiers of Sarawak from 1963 – till date.
No.	Name (birth–death)	Term	Party	Coalition	Election	Chief Minister / Premier
1	Datuk Amar; Kim Min James Wong; DA PNBS (1922–2011)	22 July 1963 – 17 June 1966 (2 years, 10 months and 26 days)	Sarawak National Party (SNAP)	Alliance Party	1963	Stephen Kalong Ningkan
2	Abang Abdul Rahim Abang Moasili	24 September 1966 – 7 July 1970 (3 years, 9 months and 13 days)	National Party of Sarawak (PANAS)	Alliance Party	1966	Tawi Sli
3	Tan Sri Datuk Amar; Kuet Tze Stephen Yong; PSM DA (1921–2001)	7 July 1970 – 14 September 1974 (4 years, 2 months and 7 days)	Sarawak United Peoples' Party (SUPP)	Alliance Party	1970	Abdul Rahman Ya'kub
4	Datuk; Simon Dembab Maja; PGBK (1937–2022)	7 July 1970 – July 1973 (2 or 3 years)	Sarawak Native's Heritage Party (PESAKA)	Alliance Party	1970	Abdul Rahman Ya'kub
5	Tan Sri Datuk Amar; Kheng Hong Sim; PSM DA JMN (1921–1992)	18 September 1974 – 9 September 1991 (16 years, 11 months and 22 days)	Sarawak United Peoples' Party (SUPP)	National Front (BN)	1974	Abdul Rahman Ya'kub
6	Datuk Patinggi Tan Sri Dr; Alfred Jabu Numpang; DP PSM DA PNBS KMN PPC ABS (b. 1940)	19 September 1974 – 12 May 2016 (41 years, 7 months and 23 days)	United Bumiputera Heritage Party (PBB)	National Front (BN)	1974	Abdul Rahman Ya'kub
7	Datuk Amar; Dunstan Endawie Enchana; DA PNBS (1937–2014)	11 November 1976 – June 1980 (3 years and 6 or 7 months)	Sarawak National Party (SNAP)	National Front (BN)	1974	Abdul Rahman Ya'kub
8	Dato Sri; Daniel Tajem Miri; PNBS PJN JMN (1936–2018)	23 March 1981 – 10 March 1987 (5 years, 11 months and 15 days)	Sarawak National Party (SNAP)	National Front (BN)	1979	Abdul Rahman Ya'kub
8	Dato Sri; Daniel Tajem Miri; PNBS PJN JMN (1936–2018)	23 March 1981 – 10 March 1987 (5 years, 11 months and 15 days)	Sarawak Native People's Party (PBDS)	National Front (BN)	1983	Abdul Taib Mahmud
9	Datuk Patinggi Tan Sri Dr; Soon Kai Wong; DP PSM DA (1929–2017)	30 January 1994 – 7 September 1996 (2 years, 7 months and 8 days)	Sarawak United Peoples' Party (SUPP)	National Front (BN)	1991	Abdul Taib Mahmud
10	Datuk Patinggi Tan Sri Dr; Hong Nam George Chan; DP PSM DA PNBS KMN (b. 1936)	9 September 1996 – 16 April 2011 (14 years, 7 months and 7 days)	Sarawak United Peoples' Party (SUPP)	National Front (BN)	1996	Abdul Taib Mahmud
11	Tan Sri Datuk Amar Dr; James Jemut Masing; PSM DA PNBS (1949–2021)	13 May 2016 – 31 October 2021 (5 years, 5 months and 18 days)	Sarawak Peoples' Party (PRS)	National Front (BN)	2016	Adenan Satem
11	Tan Sri Datuk Amar Dr; James Jemut Masing; PSM DA PNBS (1949–2021)	13 May 2016 – 31 October 2021 (5 years, 5 months and 18 days)	Sarawak Peoples' Party (PRS)	Sarawak Parties Alliance (GPS)	2016	Adenan Satem
12	Datuk Amar; Douglas Uggah Embas; DA PNBS AMN (b. 1956)	13 May 2016 – Incumbent (10 years, 3 months and 6 days)	United Bumiputera Heritage Party (PBB)	Sarawak Parties Alliance (GPS)	2016	Adenan Satem
12	Datuk Amar; Douglas Uggah Embas; DA PNBS AMN (b. 1956)	13 May 2016 – Incumbent (10 years, 3 months and 6 days)	United Bumiputera Heritage Party (PBB)	Sarawak Parties Alliance (GPS)	2016	Abang Abdul Rahman Zohari Abang Openg
13	Datuk Amar; Awang Tengah Ali Hasan; DA PNBS PGBK AMN (b. 1963)	6 May 2017 – Incumbent (9 years, 3 months and 13 days)	United Bumiputera Heritage Party (PBB)	Sarawak Parties Alliance (GPS)	2016	Abang Abdul Rahman Zohari Abang Openg
14	Datuk Amar Prof. Dr; Kui Hian Sim; DA PNBS PJN (b. 1965)	4 January 2022 – Incumbent (4 years, 7 months and 15 days)	Sarawak United Peoples' Party (SUPP)	Sarawak Parties Alliance (GPS)	2021	Abang Abdul Rahman Zohari Abang Openg

== See also ==
- 1966 Sarawak constitutional crisis
- 1987 Ming Court Affair
