= Constitution of Sarawak =

Supreme law of Sarawak

Constitution of the State of Sarawak

Overview
- Jurisdiction: Sarawak, Malaysia
- Subordinate to: Federal Constitution of Malaysia
- Created: 9 July 1963 (under Malaysia Agreement 1963); 29 August 1963 (under Sabah, Sarawak and Singapore (State Constitutions) Order in Council 1963); 6 September 1963 (date of gazettement)
- Date effective: 15 September 1963
- System: Parliamentary democracy Ceremonial head of state

Government structure
- Branches: Two (Executive and Legislative)
- Head of state: Yang di-Pertua Negeri
- Chambers: Unicameral
- Executive: Majlis Mesyuarat Negeri
- Citation: G.N.S. 163/63

Footnote
- Full text of the Constitution of the State of Sarawak

Constitution of the State of Sarawak was incorporated in 1963 in the state of Sarawak following the formation of federation of Malaysia. It consists of six Parts, 9 chapters, 65 Articles, and one Schedule (including 21 amendments).

== Provisions ==
Article 41 of the Sarawak Constitution stated that the state constitution can only be amended by an Ordinance enacted in the state assembly and may not be amended by other means. However, the British Privy Council, during the 1966 Sarawak constitutional crisis, judged that the federal parliament has the absolute power to amend the Sarawak constitution when the state of emergency is declared but is only on a temporary basis.

The first amendment to the Sarawak Constitution was passed on 25 June 1964. This amendment allowed other people to assume the role of the Speaker if the original Speaker unable to perform his duty. Another amendment was to remove the unrealistic expectation that indirect elections should be held within 60 days in all circumstances. On the other hand, the intergovernmental report (IGC report) stipulated that direct elections in Sarawak should be held before 16 September 1968 (4 years after the formation of Malaysia) or otherwise the Council Negri will automatically be dissolved. However, the amount of work involved in delineating new electoral boundaries had to delay the direct elections until May 1969. To prolong the lifespan of the Council Negri, the Malaysian federal constitution had to be amended.

In 1976, Articles 4(1) and (2) of the Sarawak constitution were amended into "The Yang di-Pertuan Agong shall be the head of religion of Islam in Sarawak" and "the Council Negri is empowered to make provisions for regulating Islamic affairs through a Council to advise the Yang di-Pertuan Agong". Such provisions enabled Council Negri to pass ordinances regarding Islamic religious affairs.

Following the 2021 amendment to the Constitution of Malaysia, the office of Chief minister of sarawak was formally changed to "Premier of Sarawak" in the Sarawak Constitution.

== Provisions under the Malaysian federal constitution ==
According to Australian historian Vernon L Porritt, the Malaysian federal government, by installing a more pliable state government in Sarawak, was able to amend the federal constitution without much resistance, especially regarding the use of the Malay language and propagation of Islam in Sarawak. The amendment of the federal constitution enables the full integration of Sarawak as a state in Malaysia.

Upon the formation of Malaysia, Article 161E(2)(a) to (5) was written into the Malaysian federal constitution which stated that special safeguards for Sarawak may not be removed by the federation without the approval of Yang di-Pertua Negeri (Governor) of Sarawak. The 1963 court case involving The Government of the State of Kelantan v The Government of the Federation of Malaya and Tunku Abdul Rahman Putra Al-Haj stated that the federal government has the power to amend the federal constitution with two-thirds majority in parliament. In 1977, the case Loh Kooi Choon v Government of Malaysia further clarified that the federal government may not implement the federal constitution amendments that affect the safeguards in Sarawak even with two-thirds majority if approval from the Governor of Sarawak is not obtained. The special safeguards include:

- Article 113(6) that requires separate reviews on the number of federal and state constituencies in Sarawak.
- Article 121 which requires the separation of jurisdictions between the High Court in Sarawak and High Courts in Malaya
- All Articles in Chapter 8 of Part VI
- All Articles in Part XIIA
- List IIA and List IIIA in the Ninth Schedule (regarding federal and state legislative lists)
- Part IV and Part V of the Tenth Schedule (regarding the grants and sources of revenue assigned to states)

During the 1966 Sarawak constitutional crisis, the Malaysian federal government declared a state of emergency in Sarawak. Using emergency powers, the federal parliament passed the Emergency (Federal Constitution and Constitution of Sarawak) Act, 1966 which enabled the federal government to unilaterally amend the constitution of Sarawak without obtaining the approval of the Governor of Sarawak. This amendment gave power to the governor of Sarawak Abang Haji Openg to convene a Council Negri meeting and dismiss the chief minister Stephen Kalong Ningkan by passing a vote of no confidence during the sitting.

To prevent the dissolution of the Council Negri way too early before a direct election is feasible in Sarawak, the [Federal] Constitution (Amendment) Act, 1968 was enacted. This amendment enabled the Council Negri to extend its tenure until 1969 Malaysian general election. However, racial riots broke out on 13 May, which interrupted the general election. After the 13 May incident, Malaysian parliament passed [Federal] Constitution (Amendment) Act, 1971, that empowers Dewan Rakyat (House of Representatives) to pass laws restricting freedom of speech touching the special position of the Malays and natives of Sabah and Sarawak, the sovereignty of the rulers, the national language, and constitutional provisions on citizenship. Speeches delivered in Dewan Rakyat itself and all state legislative assemblies in the country (including Council Negri of Sarawak) were not exempted from this law.

On 13 July 1976, all the Sabah and Sarawak MPs supported the Malaysian parliament bill which downgraded both the states from being equal partners to Malaya as a whole to one of the 13 states in the federation by amending Article 1(2) of the Federal constitution.

On 27 August 1976, the Constitution (Amendment) Act 1976 was passed where Articles 161C and 161D were repealed. Both Articles described the non-prominence of Islam in Sarawak. The repeal of 161C allowed the passing of laws that enable special financial provisions to establish and maintain Muslim institutions or Muslim education in Sarawak without the consent of the governor of Sarawak. The repeal of Article 161D removed the two-thirds majority requirement in the Council Negri to pass laws that restrict the propagation of other religions to Muslims. The removal of these two Articles upholds Islam as the religion of the federation as enshrined under Article 3 of the federal constitution and removed the barriers to the propagation of Islam in Sarawak.

In 1983, the Mahathir Mohamad-led Parliament in a move to curtail the power of heads of state in Malaysia, passed the Constitution (Amendment) Act 1983, where 8th Schedule section 11(3) stated that a bill approved in the state legislative assembly (in Sarawak's case, the Council Negri) will eventually become state law even if the ruler or the governor of the state did not give assent within 15 days. This amendment however was reversed in another constitutional amendment the following year.

On 23 October 1985, Constitution (Amendment) Act 1985 was passed that increased the parliamentary seat allocation for Sarawak from 24 to 27 out of 180 seats in the Malaysian parliament, due to an increase of Sarawak voters to 597,237.

In 1988, Articles 83-6 of the federal constitution were amended to allow state governments to hand over lands to federal governments, turn over the rights of the reserve lands to the federal government, and enable the federal government to retain alienated land that was no longer needed. In return, state governments will be compensated accordingly. The prime minister of Malaysia, Mahathir Mohamad stated that such amendments are necessary for the federal government to carry out privatisation, economic, and development plans. In July 2023, the federal government returned 52 lots of undeveloped land to Sarawak. Meanwhile, Sarawak would return all the premiums back the federal government.

The 2021 amendment to the Constitution of Malaysia, which went into effect on 11 February 2022, saw Article 1(2) being amended to group Sabah and Sarawak as "Borneo States" and list them separately from the 11 other "States of Malaya". Article 160(2) was also amended to include the definition of Malaysia Day, and amended the definition of "Federation" to include the formation of Malaysia and the separation of Singapore. Article 161A also no longer specifically define the indigenous races of Sarawak but instead place the authority to do so under the state law of Sarawak.

== Composition ==
The Constitution of Sarawak in its current form since 1 January 2023 is composed of the following parts:

=== Part I - The State Government ===
Part 1 contains fourteen articles; article 1 to 12, which are further divided into four chapters. It pertains to the powers of the Governor (Malay: Yang di-Pertua Negeri) as the head of state and the Premier (formerly Chief Minister) as the head of government, as well as the Cabinet of Sarawak or State Executive Council as the executive authority of the state government. Unlike other Malaysian states, Sarawak does not have an official state religion, although it recognises the Yang di-Pertuan Agong as the state's head of Islam. The State Legislative Assembly however can by law make provision for regulating the Islamic religious affairs and establish a Council to advise the Yang di-Pertuan Agong in matters relating to the religion of Islam. In addition, Part 1 addresses the capacity of the state to acquire, hold or dispose of property of any kind, and to sue or be sued.

=== Part II - The Legislature ===
Part 2 consists of nineteen articles; article 13 to 27. It pertains to the establishment and the proceedings of the Sarawak State Legislative Assembly, the legislature of the State of Sarawak. Among the issues addressed are the qualifications of the elected State Assemblymen, the summoning, prorogation and dissolution of the legislature, the election of the Speaker, legislative powers and procedures, and the remuneration of the State Assemblymen.

=== Part III - Financial Provisions ===
Part 3 covers seven articles; article 28 to 34, and pertains to the state's financial provisions, including taxation, the annual publication of financial statements, state government's expenditure and Supply Bills.

=== Part IV - The Public Service ===
Part 4 includes five articles; article 35 to 38A, and pertains to the functions and procedures of the Public Service Commission, as well as the impartial treatment of the state government's employees.

=== Part V - General Provisions ===
Part 5 includes seven articles; article 39 to 45, and pertains to General Provisions such as Reservation of quotas in respect of public service and educational facilities for Natives, usage of the public seal, as well as the amendment, interpretation and reprinting of the Constitution.

=== Part VI - Transitional Provisions ===
Part 6, which contains thirteen articles; article 46 to 57 minus deleted article 58, pertains to Transitional Provisions which took effect upon the establishment of the Malaysian Federation in 1963. Among the issues addressed within Part 6 are all matters of the State prior the formation of Malaysia and relations within the United Kingdom as a Crown Colony such as: the appointment of the first Governor of Sarawak, the proceedings of the state government during a specified transition period and the transfer of officers.

=== Schedules ===
Forms of Oaths and Affirmations

1. Part 1: Oath of Office of Yang di-Pertua Negeri
2. Part 2: Oath of Member of Majlis Mesyuarat Kerajaan Negeri or Assistant Minister
3. Part 3: Oath of Speaker/Deputy Speaker/Member of Dewan Undangan Negeri
4. Part 3A: Oath of Secretary/Deputy Secretary to Dewan Undangan Negeri
5. Part 4: Oath of Member of Public Service Commission

== See also ==
- Constitution of Malaysia
- Constitution of Sabah
