= 1966 Sarawak constitutional crisis =

- Date: 1965–1966
- Location: Sarawak, Malaysia
- Caused by: Dissatisfaction towards Stephen Kalong Ningkan leadership
- Goals: Removal of Stephen Kalong Ningkan from the chief minister post
- Methods: Motion of no confidence against Stephen Kalong Ningkan
- Result: State of emergency declared in Sarawak; Amendment of Sarawak state constitution; Removal of Ningkan from chief minister post

Parties
Sarawak National Party (SNAP)	Parti Negara Sarawak (PANAS); Barisan Rakyat Jati Sarawak (BARJASA); Parti Pesaka Sarawak (PESAKA)

Lead figures
Stephen Kalong Ningkan	Abang Haji Openg; Tawi Sli

The 1966 Sarawak constitutional crisis took place in the state of Sarawak, Malaysia from 1965 to 1966. This crisis was started by a group of politicians who were dissatisfied towards Stephen Kalong Ningkan's leadership as chief minister. Ningkan was later removed from the chief minister post by the Governor of Sarawak in June 1966. However, Ningkan was reinstated by the High Court in early September 1966. He was ousted from the chief minister office for the final time at the end of September 1966 and was replaced by Tawi Sli as the new chief minister. It was widely believed that the ouster of Ningkan was a result of interference by the Malaysian federal government due to him being a strong advocate of greater state autonomy.

== Background ==
Stephen Kalong Ningkan was the leader of the Sarawak Alliance which comprised Sarawak National Party (SNAP), Parti Pesaka Sarawak (PESAKA), Barisan Ra'ayat Jati Sarawak (BARJASA), and Sarawak Chinese Association (SCA). On 22 July 1963, Ningkan was appointed as the first chief minister of Sarawak following his party landslide winnings of the 1963 Sarawak district council elections. Temenggung Jugah (leader of the PESAKA party) was originally poised to become the first governor of Sarawak however he was transferred to a newly created portfolio called "Federal Minister of Sarawak Affairs" because of the opposition from the Malaysian federal government against the Dayaks to fill up the two highest posts in the state. Ningkan did not include any of the PESAKA representatives in his state cabinet despite the party contributing a significant number of seats for the Alliance. Ningkan did not have a good relationship with the federal government and also with his component parties such as PESAKA and BARJASA. He excluded both PESAKA and BARJASA from the cabinet decision-making process and opposed the usage of Malay language as the official language in Sarawak. Ningkan was also slow in replacing the expatriate officers from the state civil service to enable the Borneotisation of the state civil service. Ningkan opined that expatriates should hold the office until the locals were suitable to take over the positions. In the next three years, the Malays of PANAS and BARJASA were working together trying to topple Ningkan from power. They tried to bring the peninsular-based United Malays National Organisation (UMNO) into Sarawak to consolidate their power against Ningkan. However, after an assessment by the peninsular UMNO, the plan was cancelled because the party would require the support of other non-muslim Dayaks in order to survive in Sarawak as the group made up 50% of the total Sarawak population.

In 1965, Ningkan tried to initiate a land reform law that would allow the natives to sell their land to anyone including the Chinese. Such a law would also allow the natives to acquire large tracts of forest land. Ningkan's action angered the leaders in BARJASA party. Subsequently, Sarawak Native Alliance consisting of Parti Negara Sarawak (PANAS), BARJASA party, and Parti Pesaka Sarawak (PESAKA) was formed in order to challenge Ningkan's leadership. The land bill was subsequently withdrawn and PESAKA reaffirmed its standing with SNAP while accused BARJASA for splitting Iban's unity amongst SNAP and PESAKA. Ningkan then expelled BARJASA from the Alliance. However, negotiations restarted between the Alliance and BARJASA. BARJASA and PANAS were later readmitted into the Alliance. Two ministerial posts were reinstated for BARJASA, two new ministerial posts were created for PESAKA and one ministerial post was created for PANAS.

On 13 June 1966, Ningkan sacked Abdul Taib Mahmud (a BARJASA leader) from the post of Minister of Communication and Works for the second time. Ningkan accused Taib for trying to topple the state government. On the following day, PESAKA and BARJASA ministers resigned voluntarily from the state cabinet.

== The political crisis ==
On 16 June 1966, 21 out of 42 members of the state legislature declared that they did not have confidence in Stephen Kalong Ningkan. The 21 assemblymen wrote a petition to the Governor of Sarawak stating that they have lost confidence in the chief minister. The prime minister of Malaysia, Tunku Abdul Rahman also advocated the petition and asked Ningkan to resign.

On the same day, the Governor, Abang Haji Openg, at the insistence of the federal government in Kuala Lumpur, requested Ningkan to resign from the post. However, Ningkan refused to resign from the cabinet. Ningkan argued that the letter has not been supported by a formal motion of no confidence against him at the Council Negri (now Sarawak State Legislative Assembly). He also demanded the names of all the 21 Council Negri members who signed the petition. Ningkan also claimed that he still commanded a majority of the state assembly members and challenged his dissidents into a formal debate of motion of no confidence in the Council Negeri. Since Ningkan refused to resign, the governor then declared that Ningkan has ceased to hold office and appointed Tawi Sli as the new chief minister. The Governor also forwarded the names who had signed the petition to Ningkan.

== Judicial intervention in the political dispute ==
Following the ouster, Ningkan decided bring the case into Kuching High Court and named the Governor as the first defendant and Tawi Sli as the second defendant. On 7 September 1966, Chief Justice of Borneo, Justice Harley, delivered a verdict that reinstated Ningkan back to his chief minister post. According to Section 21 of the Interpretation Ordinance of the Sarawak state constitution, only the Council Negri has the power to appoint or dismiss a chief minister. The Governor does not have the power to dismiss a chief minister. However, chief minister can only be dismissed if he had lost the confidence of Council Negri or he refused to resign from the chief minister post but he also failed to advise a dissolution of the Council Negri.

== The removal of Ningkan ==
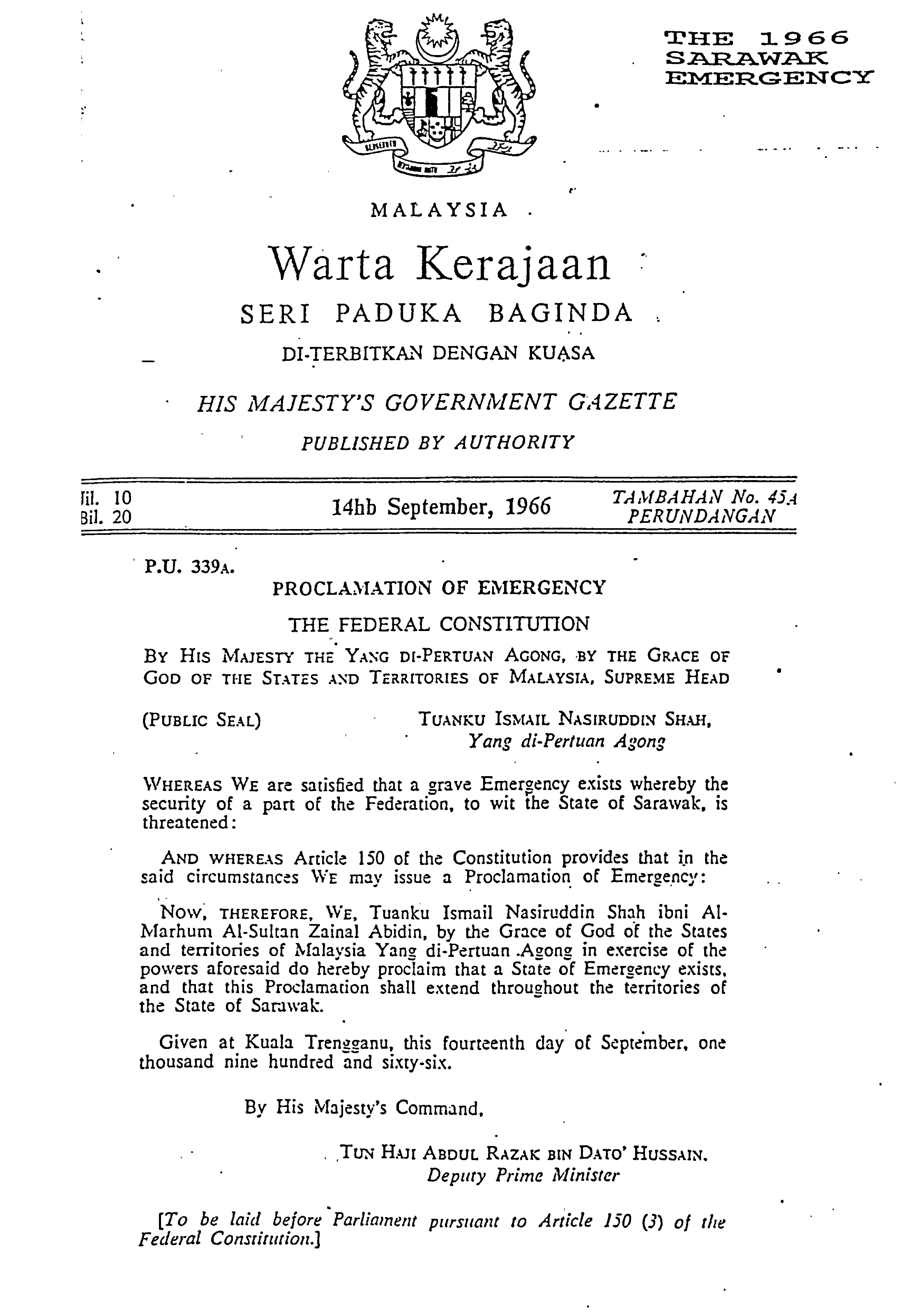
The proclamation of emergency issued on 14 September 1966.

Following the court's decision, Ningkan tried to initiate a dissolution of Council Negri so that he could seek a fresh mandate from the voters. However, on 14 September 1966, the Yang di-Pertuan Agong on the advice of the federal government declared a state of emergency in Sarawak, which was announced to the public by deputy prime minister Abdul Razak through Radio Malaysia Sarawak at 1.15pm the next day, citing deteriorating situation and security concerns in the state. Through the Emergency (Federal Constitution and the Constitution of Sarawak) Act 1966, an amendment was made to Article 150 of the Federal Constitution and the Constitution of the State of Sarawak. Such amendment authorised the Governor of Sarawak to convene a Council Negri meeting without going through the chief minister. A Council Negri meeting was commenced on 23 September 1966 and Ningkan was successfully removed from the chief minister post.

== Aftermath ==
Ningkan decided to bring the case to Federal Court of Malaysia after his second ouster. Ningkan also tried to seek legal advice from the British government about Britain's role in setting the conditions of Sarawak entering Malaysia and the signing of the London's agreement on behalf of Sarawak. Ningkan also argued that the Sarawak constitutional amendment was illegal because the state of emergency was declared under unusual circumstances. On 1 December 1967, the Federal Court determined that Yang di-Pertuan Agong has the absolute power to decide on the declaration of emergency, the parliament of Malaysia has the power to amend the constitution of Sarawak based on Article 150 of the Federal Constitution without consulting the governor of Sarawak. Meanwhile, there is not enough evidence to suggest that the declaration of emergency was done without the consideration of the security situation in Sarawak. On 1 August 1968, Judicial Committee of the Privy Council of United Kingdom dismissed Ningkan's appeal. MacDermott stated that, "their Lordships could not find any reason for saying that the emergency was not grave and did not threaten the security of Sarawak."
