= John Pike (civil servant) =

British colonial administrator (1924–2020)

Dato' John Pike CBE PNBS
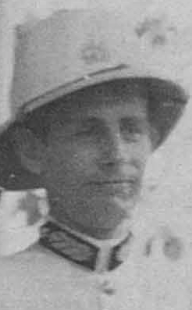
- Pike in 1963

Financial Secretary of Sarawak
- In office 1964–1966
- Chief Minister: Stephen Kalong Ningkan; Tawi Sli
- Preceded by: Bryan Audley Hepburn
- Succeeded by: T’en Kuen Foh

Personal details
- Born: 7 January 1924 Oxford, United Kingdom
- Died: 23 June 2020 (aged 96) Long Hanborough, Oxfordshire
- Citizenship: British
- Spouse: Elspeth Pike (m. 1948; died 2007) Jan Pike (m. 2012)
- Education: St Edmund Hall
- Alma mater: University of Oxford (MA); London School of Economics (MSc)
- Profession: Civil servant

Military service
- Branch/service: British Army
- Years of service: 1941–1946
- Rank: Captain
- Unit: Army Intelligence Corps
- Battles/wars: World War II

John Pike CBE (7 January 1924 – 23 June 2020) was a British military officer, civil servant, and administrator who served as Financial State Secretary of Sarawak between 1963 until his removal in 1966. He was involved in the negotiations that led to the Malaysia Agreement and the formation of Federation of Malaysia in 1963. Later in life, Pike served as the financial secretary of the London School of Economics.

== Early life and education ==
John Pike was born on 7 January 1924 in Croydon to Chip and Betty Pike. He was educated at Dauntsey's School in Wiltshire. He then entered St. Edmund Hall at Oxford where he studied French and German. At 18, John was recruited to the Intelligence Corps and spent a year at the School of Oriental and African Studies learning Japanese.

He began his studies at the University of Oxford which was interrupted by the outbreak of war, returning to his studies in 1946 to read philosophy, politics, and economics under a shortened degree due to his war service where he earned a Master of Arts in 1948. In 1948, he graduated from the London School of Economics with a master's degree from its Department of International Development.

John met his future wife, Elspeth, in London while completing his training for the colonial service. Having met in September 1948, they married on 17 December.

== Military career (1941-1945) ==
During the Second World War, he held the rank of lieutenant, and subsequently captain, in the Army Intelligence Corps.

Pike learned to speak Japanese at the School of Oriental & African Studies between 1942 and 1943. Due to his training in Japanese and German, he was given access to intelligence derived from both the German Enigma Code and its Japanese counterpart, System 97. Pike was initially assigned to the Parachute Training School as part of a proposed plan to airdrop him into the Penang area. However, the operation was aborted following the atomic bombings of Hiroshima and Nagasaki, and thus the subsequent end of the war.

After the war, Pike was posted to Labuan and then to Kuching, where he served as Officer Commanding South East Asia Translation and Interrogation Centre (SEATIC) in Sarawak. In December 1945, he was dispatched to Aceh in Sumatra with a company of the Durham Light Infantry to facilitate the withdrawal of the Japanese Imperial Guards Division, which had become subject to hostilities from the local populace, who were utilising weapons previously supplied by the Japanese.

Returning to Kuching, Pike was tasked with capturing two escaped Japanese war criminals where the pursuit extended into what was then Dutch Borneo. However, the Japanese individuals were never brought to trial, as they had already been decapitated by Dayaks.

He returned to Oxford in 1946 to complete his studies.

In 1948, he also graduated from the London School of Economics with a master's degree under its Department of International Development.

== Early career in Sarawak ==
=== Colonial administrator (1949-1963) ===
He applied for a post in Sarawak there after finishing his degree at Oxford, joining the Sarawak Administrative Service as a cadet officer in 1949. His first post was in the Sarikei Sub-District downriver from Sibu. He wished to continue the Brooke-era style governance of establishing a close rapport with the local people.

Pike was serving as Acting District Officer for Binatang when on 3 December the British governor, Duncan Stewart, was attacked by assassins, eventually succumbing to his wounds on 10 December, with Pike being assigned to defend the assassins in court. As he was also a magistrate, Pike adjudicated in both civil and criminal cases. He was appointed District Officer to the Lawas District on 25 February 1951 under Resident J.C.B Fisher.

In late 1955, Pike was posted to the Colonial Secretariat in Kuching as Principal Assistant Secretary of Finance. He gained significant experience in central government over the subsequent eight years as following this, he served consecutively as Principal Assistant Secretary for Local Government briefly in 1959, for Economy between 1960 and 1961, and as Under Secretary of Finance and Planning from 1962 to 1963.

In 1959, Pike drafted a document titled "The Financing of Primary Education and Financial Assistance to Local Authorities" which was passed by the Council Negri in August. The legislation aimed to transition the task of funding and overseeing primary education to local authorities. In May 1961, Pike, as acting Secretary of Economy, along with SUPP Chairman Ong Kee Hui, attended a special marketing meeting in Bangkok of the Economic Commission for Asia and Far East (ECAFE) where they unsuccessfully negotiated to stabilise pepper prices.

In 1961, Pike was nominated to attend a course in Washington at the World Bank's Economic Development Institute (EDI). The EDI course together with discussions with the other attendees proved influential towards the policies he implemented during his subsequent career. During the course, Pike wrote a 72-page monograph titled The Fiscal Implications for Sarawak of Entering a Federation of Malaysia which was accepted into the World Bank Library in March 1962.

=== Malaysia Agreement 1963 ===
He was heavily involved in the negotiations between the Sarawak, Malayan, and British governments in prelude to the Malaysia Agreement 1963.

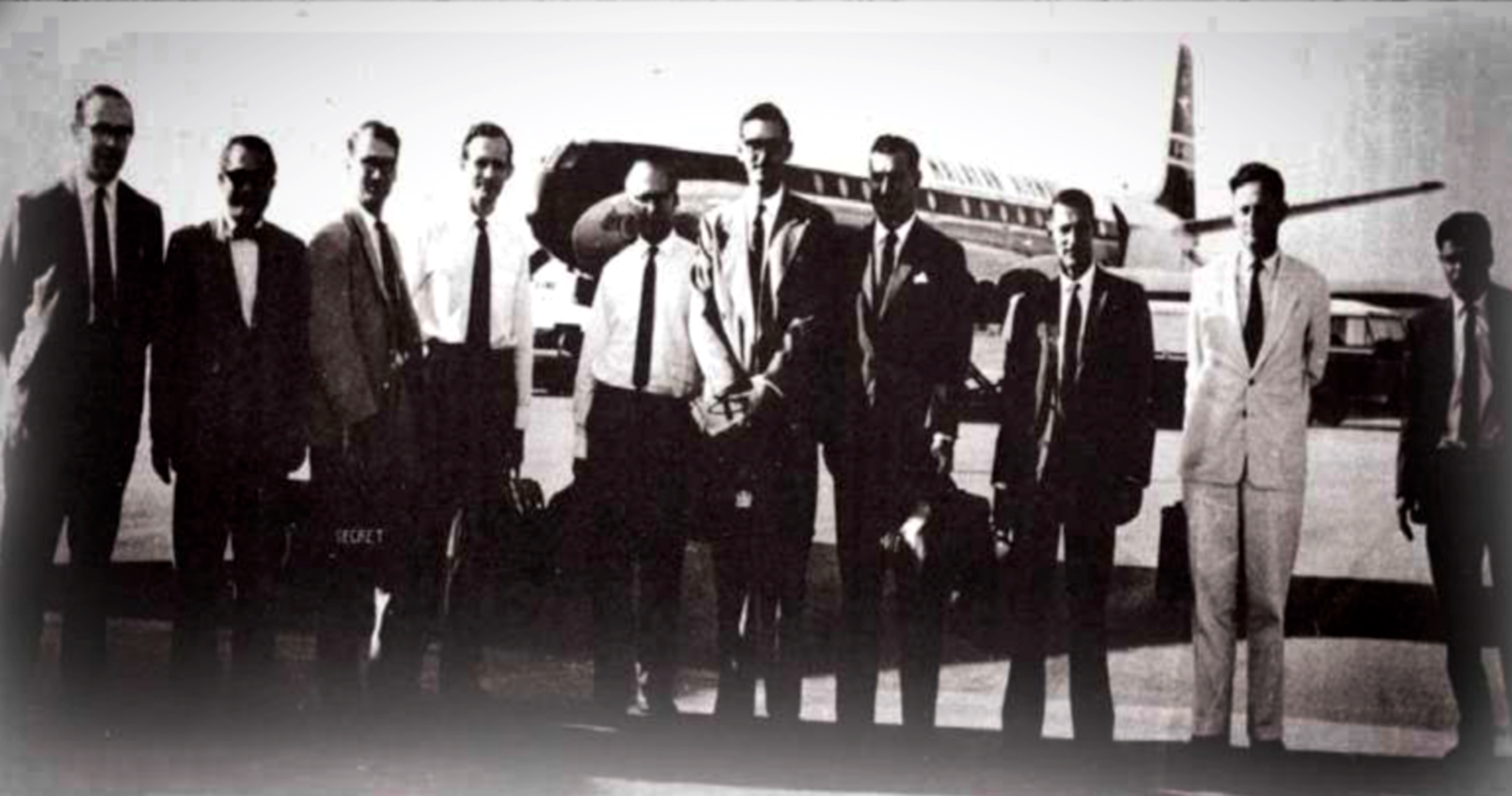
Pike (fourth from the left) in Kuala Lumpur, 17 January 1963

== As State Financial Secretary (1964–1966) ==
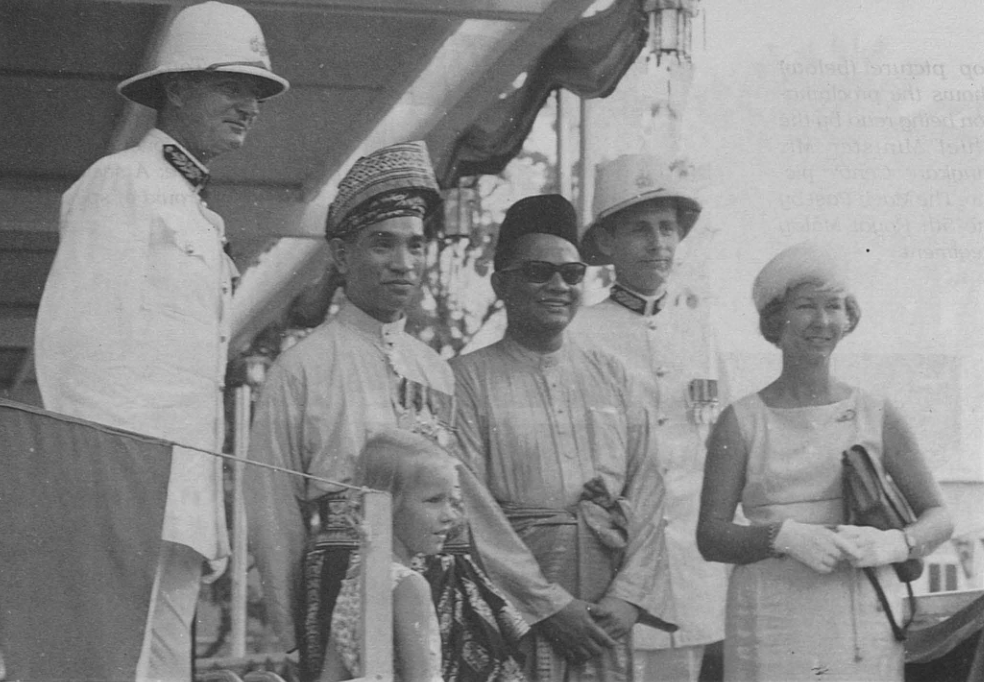
Pike (second right) and his wife (far right) on 16 September 1963 in Kuching

=== Ningkan government ===
As part of the London Agreement, the British government encouraged British citizens serving in Sarawak to stay and help the new administration with their experience in government. Therefore, when Sarawak joined the Federation of Malaysia, Pike was appointed as the new Financial Secretary of Sarawak under the administration of the first native Chief Minister of Sarawak, Stephen Kalong Ningkan. Pike succeeded the previous financial secretary, B. A. Hepburn, who was transferred to a new post in Kuala Lumpur in December 1964.

Pike was one of three remaining non-native members of the state cabinet and an ex officio member of the state legislature, the Council Negri. He and the others agreed to serve in the state government until 1967 to make way for native civil servants as part of the Malaysia Agreement.

As financial secretary, Pike wrote on Sarawak's economic future within the larger Federation of Malaysia, outlining his thoughts of investing in modern infrastructure, the modernisation and subsidisation of agriculture, and centralised state planning.

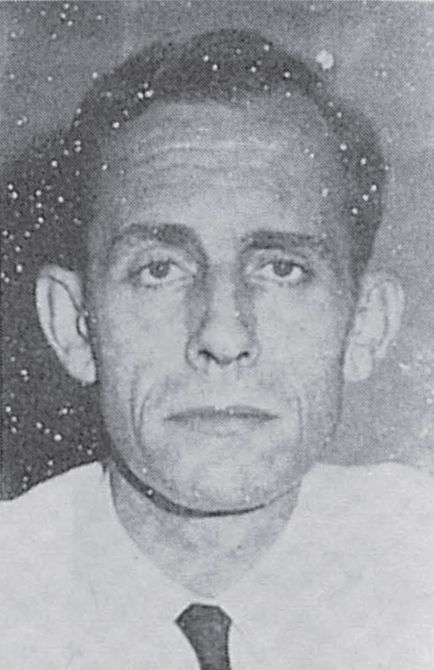
Pike, circa 1965

=== Removal from office ===
Following the 1966 Sarawak Constitutional Crisis, Pike was abruptly removed from his post as state financial secretary before the agreed upon year of 1967. The new Chief Minister, Tawi Sli, had publicly brought up the idea of replacing all British civil servants left over from the days of British administration with native Sarawakians. The acting Chief Minister, Taib Mahmud, then proceeded to announce that all posts in the Sarawak Civil Service would be held by natives by October 1967. It is generally understood now that Tawi Sli did not intend to remove Pike from his post.

Pike was succeed in his post as state financial secretary by T’en Kuen Foh.

== Later life and career ==
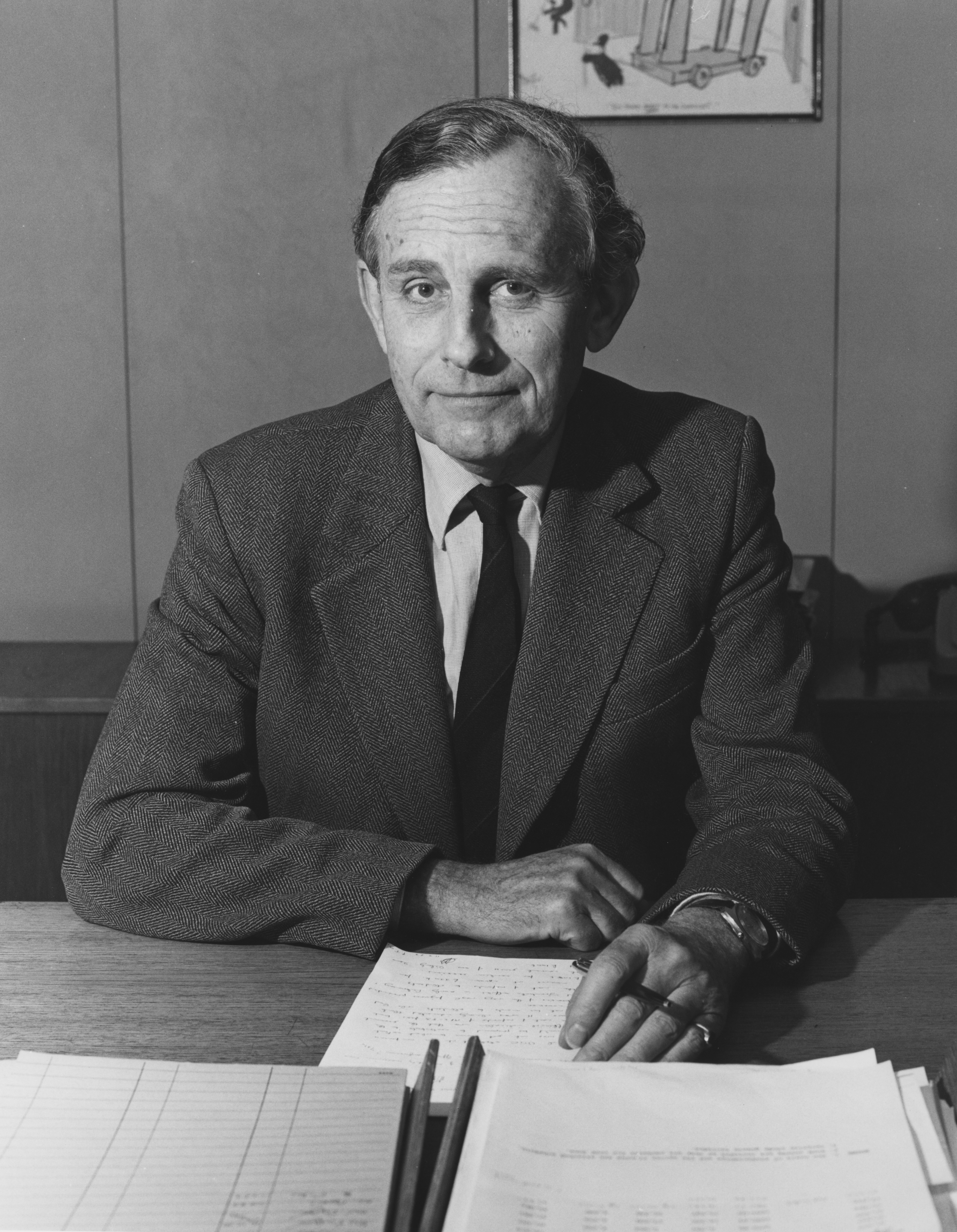
Pike as Financial Secretary of the LSE, circa 1980s.

After his abrupt removal, he returned to England and became financial secretary to the London School of Economics until retiring in 1983. Due to his financial experience, he was persuaded to be become Honorary Treasurer of the International African Institute (IAI).

From 1971 to 1998, he served as a founding trustee of the Sarawak Foundation. He also served as Honorary Treasurer of the Sarawak Association from 1980 to 2004. Later in life, he became a member of the Burma Campaign Society.

Elspeth died in 2007. In 2012, the elderly widowed Pike remarried to Jan Pike, another local resident of Long Hansborough.

== Death ==
On 23 June 2020, Pike died at the age of 96 in Long Hanborough, Oxfordshire.

== Awards and recognitions ==
- United Kingdom
  - Commander of the Order of the British Empire (CBE)
- Sarawak
  - Knight Commander of the Most Exalted Order of the Star of Sarawak (PNBS) – Dato' (1965)

== Bibliography ==
- Abang Openg bin Abang Sapiee, D. (1953, August 31). England at coronation time. The Sarawak Gazette, 79(1146), 147–148. https://www.pustaka-sarawak.com/gazette/gazette_uploaded/1402651156.pdf
- Burma Campaign Society. (2010, March). Burma Campaign Society newsletter (No. 15). http://theburmacampaignsociety.org/newsletters/No15-March-2010.pdf
- HC Deb (19 July 1963). vol. 681, cols. 817–918. https://api.parliament.uk/historic-hansard/commons/1963/jul/19/malaysia-bill
- Ho, Ah Chon (1993). Sarawak Historical Events 1946–1960 (PDF). Comp. See Hua Daily News Bhd.
- Ho, Ah Chon (1995). Sarawak Historical Events 1963 (PDF). Comp. See Hua Daily News Bhd.
- Ho, Ah Chon (1996). Sarawak Historical Events 1965 (PDF). Comp. See Hua Daily News Bhd.
- London School of Economics and Political Science (2022). "Obituaries 2022".
- "Notes and News". Africa: Journal of the International African Institute. 55 (2). International African Institute: 207–211. 1985. JSTOR 1160303.
- Porritt, Vernon L. (2004). "Turbulent times in Sarawak: The end of expatriate influence and the call for British intervention". The Sarawak Museum Journal. 59 (80): 75–104.
- Porritt, Vernon L. (2005). "From British military intelligence to financial secretary of Sarawak: John Pike 1945-1967". Borneo Research Bulletin. 36: 68+.
- Porritt, Vernon L. (2009). "The end of expatriate influence in Sarawak: The federation issue, 1960–1963" (PDF). Borneo Research Bulletin. 40: 111–134.
- St Edmund Hall. (2020). The Aularian: St Edmund Hall magazine 2019–2020. https://www.seh.ox.ac.uk/wp-content/uploads/Teddy-Hall-Magazine-pages-compressed.pdf
- St Edmund Hall (2021). "Obituary: John Pike (1942)". The Aularian. pp. 118–119.
- The Sarawak Gazette. (1963, July 31). 89(1265). https://www.pustaka-sarawak.com/gazette/gazette_uploaded/1404721047.pdf
