= Tuanku Bujang =

Malaysian politician (1898–1986)

Yang Amat Berbahagia Tun Datuk Patinggi Tuanku Bujang Tuanku Othman SMN DP SPDK PSM PPM OBE
- توانكو بوجڠ توانكو عثمان
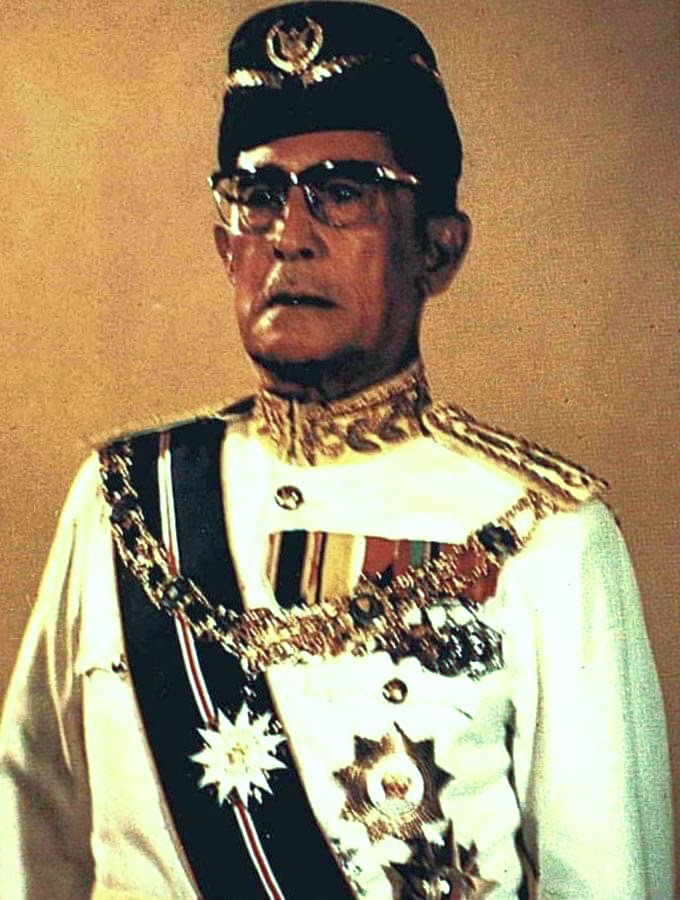

2nd Yang di-Pertua Negeri of Sarawak
- In office 2 April 1969 – 2 April 1977
- Chief Minister: Tawi Sli; Abdul Rahman Ya'kub
- Preceded by: Abang Openg Abang Sapiee
- Succeeded by: Abang Muhammad Salahuddin Abang Barieng

Personal details
- Born: 12 December 1898 Sibu, Kingdom of Sarawak
- Died: 28 November 1986 (aged 87) Kuching, Sarawak, Malaysia
- Spouse: Rajemah
- Relations: Abang Abdul Rahman Zohari Abang Openg (son-in-law)

Military service
- Allegiance: British Army; Raj of Sarawak
- Years of service: 1942–1946
- Rank: Lieutenant
- Unit: Sarawak Rangers
- Battles/wars: Operation Semut

Tuanku Bujang bin Tuanku Othman (Jawi: توانكو بوجڠ بن توانكو عثمان; 12 December 1898 – 28 November 1986) was a Malaysian statesman, war veteran and politician who served as the second Yang di-Pertua Negeri (Governor) of Sarawak from 1969 to 1977.

== Early life ==
Tuanku Bujang bin Tuanku Othman was born on 12 December 1898 in Sibu, Sarawak. He was a member of the Rajang Perabangan Malay community. His heritage traced back to Arab Hadhrami ancestry, and he was related to the Brunei nobility through Governor Syarif Masahor of Sarikei.

== Early career ==
At the age of 26, in 1924, Tuanku Bujang was present during the Kapit peacemaking between the Brooke administration and the Kayan-Kenyah rebels from Ulu Belaga and Kalimantan. It was at this event that he formed friendships with Jugah Barieng and his brother Tedong, nephews of Koh Jubang. These connections would later play a significant role in Sarawak's political landscape.

On 1 January 1932, at the age of 29, Tuanku Bujang joined the newly formed Sarawak Constabulary, becoming the first Malay from Sibu to be promoted to the rank of probationary inspector — one rank below Sarawak's top police officer at the time, Datu Bandar Abang Mustapha.

In 1934, Tuanku Bujang gained recognition for his bravery when he tackled and disarmed an armed man who had run amok in Sibu. For his act, Rajah Charles Vyner Brooke awarded him a Sarawak medal for valour. Later that same year, he was appointed as a native officer and served in Kuching, where he was further promoted to the role of magistrate.

=== Wartime and post-war activities ===
During the Second World War, after the fall of Kuching, Tuanku Bujang led Force B, a 105-strong detachment of the Sarawak Rangers, although the unit was disbanded shortly after Kuching's capture. He was a lieutenant at the time. Under Japanese occupation, he was appointed a senior administrative officer. As the tide of war changed, he joined the Australian-led Operation Semut, a guerrilla unit working with local resistance fighters. He played a role in the liberation of Kuching on 11 September 1945.

== Political career ==
Following the end of the war, Tuanku Bujang became involved in the anti-cession movement, opposing Charles Vyner Brooke's decision to cede Sarawak to the British crown in 1946. Vyner received a £2 million honorarium in return for the cession. Tuanku Bujang supported local resistance against the colonial handover. However, after the assassination of Governor Sir Duncan Stewart in 1949 and the collapse of the anti-cession movement, he rejoined the colonial administration.

In 1955, Tuanku Bujang was conferred the title 'Datu', and in 1957, he received the Member of the Most Excellent Order of the British Empire (MBE) from Queen Elizabeth II. Following that, he was promoted to administrative officer.

With the formation of Malaysia in 1963, Tuanku Bujang was appointed to the Malaysian Senate. As politics in Sarawak gained momentum, he became involved in the formation of political parties. He played a key role in founding the Barisan Rakyat Jati Sarawak (BARJASA) on 29 December 1961, alongside Abdul Rahman Ya'kub and Abang Muhammad Salahuddin. Tuanku Bujang served as the inaugural president of the party, which aimed to represent the interests of the Malay and native bumiputera communities.

In 1962, Tuanku Bujang's old ally Jugah Barieng founded Parti Pesaka (PESAKA), another indigenous-based party. Tuanku Bujang continued to support the idea of strong Malay-native political representation. On 28 March 1968, BARJASA merged with PANAS to form Parti Bumiputera, with Tuanku Bujang serving as vice president. Later, on 30 April 1973, Parti Bumiputera merged with PESAKA to create Parti Pesaka Bumiputera Bersatu (PBB). The new party was led by Jugah as president and Abdul Taib Mahmud as deputy president.

== Yang di-Pertua Negeri ==
He was appointed as the second Yang di-Pertua Negeri (Governor of Sarawak) by the King of Malaysia upon the death of the former governor, Tun Abang Haji Openg. Upon the appointment, he was awarded Seri Maharaja Mangku Negara (S.M.N.), which carried the title "Tun". He would serve as the governor for the second term in 1973, before his term ended in 1977.

== Post-governorship and death ==
Little is known about his doing after his tenure as the governor of Sarawak ended in 1977. On 28 November 1986, he died peacefully in Kuching, where he was buried.

== Honours ==
=== Honours of Malaysia ===
- Malaysia
  - Recipient of the Malaysian Commemorative Medal (Silver) (PPM) (1965)
  - Commander of the Order of Loyalty to the Crown of Malaysia (PSM) – Tan Sri (1967)
  - Grand Commander of the Order of the Defender of the Realm (SMN) – Tun (1970)
- Sarawak
  - Knight Grand Commander of the Order of the Star of Hornbill Sarawak (DP) – Datuk Patinggi
- Sabah
  - Grand Commander of the Order of Kinabalu (SPDK) – Datuk Seri Panglima

=== Honours of the United Kingdom ===
- United Kingdom
  - Member of the Order of the British Empire (MBE)

=== Things named after him ===
Several things were named after him, including:

- Kolej Tun Datu Tuanku Haji Bujang (KTDTHB) in Miri
- Padang Sukan Tun Datuk Patinggi Tuanku Haji Bujang, Bukit Lima Sports Complex in Sibu
- Dataran Tun Tuanku Bujang in Sibu
- Arena Tun Tuanku Haji Bujang, Sports Complex at Universiti Malaysia Sarawak (UNIMAS), Samarahan
- Jambatan Tun Datuk Patinggi Tuanku Haji Bujang, Sarikei

Political offices
Preceded by Abang Haji Openg	Yang di-Pertua Negeri Sarawak; 1969 - 1977	Succeeded by Abang Muhammad Salahuddin
