= Governor of Sarawak =

Governor of Sarawak may refer to:

- Governors of the Crown Colony of Sarawak from 1946 to 1963
- Yang di-Pertua Negeri of Sarawak, the ceremonial head of state of Sarawak since 1963
