= Tun Jugah Shopping Centre =

- Wisma Tun Jugah
- Location: Kuching, Sarawak, Malaysia
- Coordinates: 1.5573°N 110.3535°E
- Address: 18, Jalan Tunku Abdul Rahman, 93100, Kuching, Sarawak, Malaysia.
- Opened: 2000; 26 years ago
- Owner: Limar Management Services Sdn. Bhd.
- Floor area: 200,000 square feet
- Floors: 3 (retail); 9 (office suites); 2 (parking lot)
- Website: https://tunjugah.com

Tun Jugah Shopping Centre (Wisma Tun Jugah) is a shopping complex located in Kuching, Sarawak, Malaysia, owned by Limar Management Service Sdn. Bhd.. It is built in remembrance of the late Tun Jugah, a patriot engaged in the independence and formation of Malaysia. The Tun Jugah Foundation Museum & Gallery also located in the building, to preserve and to promote the traditional methods of Iban weaving.
