= 1963 Sarawak district council elections =

Malaysian state indirect election

1963 Sarawak District Council Elections
- 18–25 June 1963

429
- Turnout: 72.7%
Candidate	Sarawak Alliance	Parti Negara Sarawak (PANAS)	Sarawak United Peoples' Party (SUPP)
Percentage	30.6%	15.2%	24.5%
Candidate	Independents
Percentage	29.7%
Chief Minister before election
New position
Chief Minister-elect
Stephen Kalong Ningkan
Sarawak Alliance

The second Sarawak district council elections was held in 1963. The results of the election was announced from 18 to 25 June 1963. A total of 185,000 voters (72.7% of the registered electorate) cast votes in this election, and a total of 998 candidates were vying for 429 district council seats in Sarawak.

== Background ==
Before this election, the Sarawak colonial government had amended the constitution of Sarawak to reduce the number of ex officio members to three in the Council Negri (now Sarawak State Legislative Assembly), with other members indirectly elected in the three-tiered district council elections. The speaker also becomes politically appointed, and the chief secretary of the colonial government was replaced by the president of the Supreme Council (today cabinet of Sarawak). Members of the Supreme Council would be appointed to their ministerial roles, while the chief minister would be appointed as the head of government.

On 27 May 1961, Tunku Abdul Rahman, the prime minister of the Federation of Malaya, announced a plan to form a greater federation together with Singapore, Sarawak, Sabah and Brunei, to be called Malaysia. On 17 January 1962, the Cobbold Commission was formed to gauge the support of Sarawak and Sabah for the plan; the Commission reported 80 percent support for the federation. As the target date 31 August 1963 for the creation of Malaysia was fast approaching, the four parties (Singapore, Brunei, Sarawak, and Sabah) were going nowhere on their negotiations with Malaya. Singapore prime minister Lee Kuan Yew had refused previous financial terms nearing settlement after a rift with Malayan Chinese Association (now Malaysian Chinese Association). The Sultan of Brunei also halted financial negotiation with Malaya. Sultan of Brunei was reported to questioned his precedence in the Malaysian Conference of Rulers and was apparently unsatisfied at his fourth position in the hierarchy. However, he later denied the breakdown of Brunei-Malaya talk was due to the issue of precedence.

The political system in Sarawak was so new that defections and realignment of political parties can almost certainly be expected. There were three major political parties in Sarawak at that time: Sarawak United Peoples' Party (SUPP), Parti Negara Sarawak (PANAS), and Sarawak Alliance (Alliance). SUPP was led by Ong Kee Hui, who was a banking executive and also a Kuching Municipal Council chairman. Another prominent leader of the party, Stephen Yong, was an English and Chinese educated barrister working in Kuching. However, SUPP was also infiltrated with communist supporters. Although the party was non-racial, the majority of its members were Chinese. On the other hand, PANAS was a member of the Alliance. PANAS broke away from the Alliance in April 1963 because of its dissatisfaction of alleged interference of local affairs by the Malayan Alliance Party. Although PANAS leadership was multi-racial, it became predominantly a Malay party. Meanwhile, Alliance comprised four parties: Sarawak National Party (SNAP), Parti Pesaka Sarawak (PESAKA), Barisan Ra'ayat Jati Sarawak (BARJASA), and Sarawak Chinese Association (SCA). SNAP was led by the party secretary, namely Stephen Kalong Ningkan, where he drawn his support from the Iban people of the second division of Sarawak (today Betong and Sri Aman Divisions). PESAKA was founded by Temenggung Jugah after his defection from PANAS in 1962. The PESAKA party drawn its support from the Ibans of the third division of Sarawak (today Sibu, Sarikei, Mukah and Kapit Divisions). BARJASA was representing Malays in the anti-cessionist faction. Lastly, SCA was founded by Ling Beng Siew. He was the former founder of PESAKA and was defeated in his own ward in 1959 elections.

== Electoral system ==
Sarawak had an indirect three-tiered electoral system. The British colonial government installed such a system for the then politically immature Sarawak so that the legislators can have some governmental experience during their tenure in office. The state was divided into 24 local authority areas, each headed by a district council which composed of elected members from single-member constituencies. All the 24 districts then grouped together to form five divisions and each division was headed by a divisional advisory council elected by the respective district councils. The divisional advisory councils then functioned to elect 36 members into Council Negri (now Sarawak State Legislative Assembly). Meanwhile, the Council Negri would select 24 members of parliament to sit in the Parliament of Malaysia. Despite being elected as members of parliament, the representatives would still be answerable to Council Negri, divisional councils, and district councils below them.

== Results ==
=== District councils ===
Of the total 429 district council seats, Sarawak Alliance won 138 seats, SUPP won 116, independents won 116 seats, and PANAS won 59 seats. On the percentage of total votes, Alliance won 30.6%, independents won 29.7%, SUPP won 24.5%, and PANAS won 15.2% of the votes. SUPP became the dominant party representing the Chinese after the election. The party was initially troubled with allegations of communist infiltration. Besides, three newspapers in support of the party were banned by the government under the Preservation of Public Security Ordinance. SUPP also faced stiff competition with SCA where the latter enjoyed support from the Peninsular based Malayan Chinese Association (MCA). Although SUPP lost a substantial number of Chinese votes in four out of five urban centres (Kuching Municipal, Kuching Rural, Sibu Urban, Sibu Rural, and Miri), it did not prevent SUPP from winning district council seats in these areas. The party also enjoyed considerable support in several non-Chinese seats. At the same time, Alliance victory was built on the overwhelming support of the Iban people to SNAP and PESAKA. Alliance captured six out of eight Iban majority districts. Although PANAS was attacked by the Alliance for deserting the latter just before the election; PANAS was able to capture 53 out of 118 seats at the first and second divisions of Sarawak. Besides, the party was able to make inroads northwards into Bintulu and Miri districts. Therefore, PANAS was seen as the voice for the Malays in the first and second divisions of Sarawak.

Seats won by party
District councils	Total seats	Alliance	PANAS	SUPP	Independents
First Division (116 seats)
Lundu	12	3	5	2	2
Kuching Rural	34	2	15	14	3
Kuching Municipal	27	0	6	21	0
Bau	16	6	1	7	2
Upper Sadong	15	6	4	2	3
Lower Sadong	12	2	8	2	0
Second Division (72 seats)
Batang Lupar	19	11	5	1	2
Lubok Antu	15	9	0	4	2
Saribas	20	9	7	4	2
Kalaka	18	11	2	1	4
Third Division (148 seats)
Sarikei	17	1	1	8	7
Binatang	15	7	0	7	1
Matu and Daro	13	7	0	1	5
Sibu Urban	21	4	0	16	1
Sibu Rural	22	4	0	12	6
Kanowit	24	16	0	3	5
Kapit	17	17	0	0	0
Mukah	19	0	0	0	19
Fourth Division (67 seats)
Bintulu	18	8	3	2	1
Subis	13	2	0	1	10
Miri	19	6	2	10	1
Baram	17	0	0	0	17
Fifth Division (30 seats)
Limbang	15	1	0	0	14
Lawas	15	6	0	0	9

=== Divisional councils ===
After the district council elections, each district council met from 1 July to 5 July 1963 in order to choose one to eight representatives into their respective divisional councils. Although PANAS had the most number of seats in the first division, it required support of the three independents to form a majority in this division. The Alliance formed a clear majority in the second division, but required the support of independents in the third division in order to form a majority. In the fourth and fifth divisions, independents clearly had an upper hand when compared to other political parties.

Composition of the divisional councils
Divisional councils	Total seats	Alliance	PANAS	SUPP	Independents
First Division	25	1	11	10	3
Second Division	22	19	1	0	2
Third Division	27	13	0	8	6
Fourth Division	22	7	0	4	11
Fifth Division	12	0	0	0	12

=== Council Negri ===
With the announcement of SUPP-PANAS coalition on 1 July, both the parties were able to command a majority in the first division of Sarawak. However, by 15 July, Alliance had an upper hand in third, fourth, and fifth divisions of Sarawak. The Alliance was able to command 16 out of 36 seats in the Council Negri. With additional support from the 7 independents, Alliance was able to command 23 seats in the Council Negri. Meanwhile SUPP-PANAS coalition was only able to command ten of the Council Negri seats. The remaining 3 independents in fifth division was still undecided.

The racial composition of the elected members is as follows: Iban 14 (13 in the Sarawak Alliance and one in the Supp); Chinese - nine (two - Sarawak Alliance; five - Supp; and two - Independent); Malays - three (two - Panas and one - pro-Panas Independent); Kenyahs and Kayans - four (Alliance); Melanaus: three (Alliance); one Land Dayak (pro-Panas Independent): one Kedayan (Alliance); and one Murut (Independent).

Composition of Council Negri
Divisional councils	Total seats	Alliance	SUPP	PANAS	Independents
First Division	10	0	5	3	2
Second Division	6	6	0	0	0
Third Division	11	8	0	0	3
Fourth Division	6	2	0	0	4
Fifth Division	3	0	0	0	3
Total	36	16	5	3	12

== Aftermath ==
Although Sarawak Alliance only received 34% of the votes during the first-tiered district council elections, it won the mandate to form the first state government of Sarawak after extensive political maneuvering in second and third-tiered elections. SUPP and PANAS, which collectively secured 1.5% more votes than the Sarawak Alliance in the first-tiered election, became the opposition. Although it was obvious that a Dayak from the principal parties (which was either SNAP or PESAKA) should become the first chief minister of Sarawak, Malaysian federal government suggested that Abdul Rahman Ya'kub (a Melanau Muslim leader from BARJASA) should become the chief minister despite his defeat in his own local ward.

However, the federal government eventually accepted a compromise that the chief minister post will be held by a Dayak from SNAP named Stephen Kalong Ningkan. The Malaysian federal government also demanded that both the chief minister and the governor post should not be held by the Dayaks simultaneously. Therefore, Temenggung Jugah, a Dayak from PESAKA, instead of becoming the first governor of Sarawak, was transferred to become the "Federal Minister of Sarawak Affairs". Abang Haji Openg, a prominent Malay aristocrat and civil servant, became the first governor of Sarawak.

Malaysia was formed on 16 September 1963. Malayan constitution was amended by incorporating some recommendations by the Inter-governmental Committee (IGC) report, excluding the clause on rights of cession and the nine cardinal principles of good governance by the Brooke government.
