= Jugah Barieng =

Malaysian politician

Temenggong Yang Amat Berbahagia Tun Datuk Patinggi Jugah anak Barieng SSM PMN DP PNBS PGDK PPM OBE
- Tun Jugah, 1960s

Minister of Sarawak Affairs
- In office 1963–1974
- Preceded by: Office established

Member of Parliament for Hulu Rajang
- In office 1971–1974
- Preceded by: Office established
- Succeeded by: Sibat Miyut Tagong

1st President of Parti Pesaka Bumiputera Bersatu
- In office 30 April 1973 – 1975
- Preceded by: Office established
- Succeeded by: Taib Mahmud

2nd Paramount Chief of the Ibans
- In office 1955–1981
- Preceded by: Koh anak Jubang
- Succeeded by: Vacant

Personal details
- Born: c. 1903 Kapit, Raj of Sarawak
- Died: 8 July 1981 (aged 78) Kuching, Sarawak, Malaysia
- Party: Parti Pesaka Sarawak (1962-1973); Parti Pesaka Bumiputera Bersatu (1973-1981)
- Spouse: Toh Puan Tiong Anding
- Relations: Alexander Nanta Linggi (grandson)
- Children: Sani Jugah (deceased); Anchang Jugah; Siah Jugah; Tan Sri Datuk Amar Leonard Linggi Jugah; Edmund Erong Jugah (deceased)
- Occupation: Politician
- Profession: Tribal chief

Jugah anak Barieng, commonly known as Tun Jugah, (c. 1903 – 8 July 1981) was an Iban-Malaysian politician from the state of Sarawak. Jugah served as a member of the Dewan Rakyat from 1971 to 1974 and was a prominent figure in the formation of the Federation of Malaysia, also serving as Minister of Sarawak Affairs from 1963 to 1974. He was also the traditional Paramount Chief of the Iban people for more than 55 years.

== Early life and career ==
Jugah was born around 1903 in Kapit, Sarawak. Little is known of his early life other than he would have had a conventional Iban upbringing for a man which included hunting. By 1923, he was appointed as a local penghulu or local chief of the Iban in Kapit.

In 1953, Jugah travelled to London as one of the representatives for Sarawak at the coronation of Queen Elizabeth II alongside future Sarawak governor Abang Openg.

By 1955, he was recognised as the Temenggong or "Paramount Chief" of all the Iban in Sarawak.

== Political career ==
In 1961, Jugah helped found the Sarawak Native's Heritage Party (PESAKA) in Sibu. PESAKA was founded to represent the Iban of Batang Rajang, as opposed to joining the Sarawak National Party (SNAP) which they viewed as overwhelmingly representing the Iban of Saribas.

== Formation of Malaysia ==
Jugah played a fundamental role in bringing Sarawak into the Federation of Malaysia on 16 September 1963. He was among the key signatories of the Malaysia Agreement 1963 in London. Sarawak had been made a British colony after the Japanese occupation and the subsequent liberation by the British and was granted self-government on 22 July 1963. Contemporary and future Chief Minister, Abdul Rahman Ya'kub, described Jugah as "the bridge to Malaysia," highlighting his role in the formation of the federation.

In the lead up to Malaysia's formation, Jugah was generally seen as the prime candidate to be the first Governor of Sarawak with fellow Iban Stephen Kalong Ningkan as Chief Minister, with the former representing PESAKA and the latter representing SNAP. According to the London Agreement, the British monarch and the Yang di-Pertuan Agong would jointly nominate the inaugural Sarawak governor. The positions of Chief Minister and Governor going both to Iban was generally accepted within Sarawak, but was untimately rejected by Malayan Prime Minister Tunku Abdul Rahman who asserted that the offices of Chief Minister and Governor cannot be monopolised by the Dayak. Eventually, the positions were filled by Stephen Kalong Ningkan and Malay Abang Openg respectively.

== After 1963 ==
After failing to be appointed governor, Jugah was instead appointed by Tunku as the Minister of Sarawak Affairs and thus a member of the Federal Cabinet. He was elected a member of the Dewan Rakyat during Malaysia's first general elections in 1963 for the constituency of Hulu Rajang.

In 1973, he became the first president of the United Traditional Bumiputera Party (PBB). The party was founded as a merger of Parti Negara Sarawak (PANAS), Barisan Ra'ayat Jati Sarawak (BARJASA) and Parti Pesaka Anak Sarawak (PESAKA) with the goal of securing the political representation and socioeconomic conditions of the Sarawak's Bumiputera.

== Death and legacy ==
He died peacefully on 8 July 1981 at Kuching, leaving behind his wife Toh Puan Tiong anak Anding, his children and grandchildren.

On the subject of Sarawak's merger with Malaysia, he state, "Anang aja Malaysia tu baka tebu, manis di pun, tabar di ujung" (Let's hope that Malaysia will not end up as a sugarcane, sweet in the beginning, but stale in the end).

Jugah's son, Leonard Linggi Jugah, is a businessman and retired politician who served as the Member of Parliament for Kapit and Secretary-General of Parti Pesaka Bumiputera Bersatu (PBB). Leonard currently serves as the Chairman of the Tun Jugah Foundation, Managing Trustee of the Dayak Cultural Foundatio, Advisor to the Dayak Chamber of Commerce & Industry, and Deputy Chairman of the Sarawak Sovereign Wealth Future Fund.

Leonard's son, and thus Jugah's grandson, Alexander Nanta Linggi, is a Malaysian politician who has represented the Kapit constituency since 1999 and currently serves as Malaysia's federal Minister of Works and the Secretary-General of Gabungan Parti Sarawak (GPS).

== Honours ==
=== Honours of Malaysia ===
- Malaysia
  - Grand Commander of the Order of Loyalty to the Crown of Malaysia (SSM) – Tun (1981)
  - Commander of the Order of the Defender of the Realm (PMN) – Tan Sri (1964)
- Sabah
  - Commander of the Order of Kinabalu (PGDK) – Datuk (1963)
- Sarawak
  - Knight Grand Commander of the Order of the Star of Hornbill Sarawak (DP) – Datuk Patinggi (1977)
  - Knight Commander of the Most Exalted Order of the Star of Sarawak (PNBS) – Dato' (1964)

=== Foreign honours ===
- United Kingdom
  - Officer of the Order of the British Empire (OBE) (1961)

== Places named after him ==
- Jalan Tun Jugah, a major road and flyover in Kuching, state capital of Sarawak
- Tun Jugah Shopping Centre
- Tun Jugah Foundation

== Literature ==
- Sutlive, Vinston (1992): Tun Jugah of Sarawak: Colonialism and Iban Response. Kuching: Sarawak Literary Society. ISBN 967-65-1787-9
