= Constitution of Sabah =

Supreme law of Sabah

Constitution of the State of Sabah

Overview
- Jurisdiction: Sabah, Malaysia
- Subordinate to: Federal Constitution of Malaysia
- Created: 9 July 1963 (under Malaysia Agreement 1963); 29 August 1963 (under Sabah, Sarawak and Singapore (State Constitutions) Order in Council 1963); 10 September 1963 (date of gazettement)
- Date effective: 15 September 1963
- System: Parliamentary democracy Ceremonial head of state

Government structure
- Branches: Two (Executive and Legislative)
- Head of state: Yang di-Pertua Negeri
- Chambers: Unicameral
- Executive: State Cabinet
- Citation: G.N.S. 129 of 1963

Footnote
- Full text of the Constitution of the State of Sabah

The Constitution of the State of Sabah is a supreme law enacted for the state of Sabah. Coming into effect upon independence within Malaysia in 1963, it is further detailed in 6 Parts, 64 Articles and two Schedules (including 33 amendments as of 1 January 2020).

== Provisions ==
Article 27 stipulates that any laws that passed either on or after Malaysia Day that is inconsistent with the Constitution will be rendered void. Thus, this makes the State Constitution a supreme law for Sabah other than the Federal Constitution of Malaysia.

== Constitutional amendment ==
Under Article 43, the Constitution may be amended only by passing an Enactment by the Sabah State Legislative Assembly and shall not be amended by any other methods possible. To amend the Constitution, the Bill must be passed with two-thirds majority after second and third readings.

Several amendments has been made to the Constitution including upholding Islam as the State official religion in 1973 and party hopping ban in 2023.

== Composition ==
The Constitution consists of:

=== Part I - The State Government ===
Part 1 contains sixteen articles; article 1 to 12, which are further divided into three chapters. It pertains to the powers of the Governor (Malay: Yang di-Pertua Negeri) as the head of state and the Chief Minister as the head of government, as well as the Cabinet of Sabah or State Executive Council as the executive authority of the state government. It also affirms Islam as the religion of the State, although "other religions may be practised in peace and harmony in any part of the State". In addition, Part 1 addresses the capacity of the state to acquire, hold or dispose of property of any kind, and to sue or be sued.

=== Part II - The Legislature ===
Part 2 consists of sixteen articles; article 13 to 27. It pertains to the establishment and the proceedings of the Sabah State Legislative Assembly, the legislature of the State of Sabah. Among the issues addressed are the qualifications of the elected State Assemblymen, the summoning, prorogation and dissolution of the legislature, the election of the Speaker, legislative powers and procedures, and the remuneration of the State Assemblymen.

=== Part III - Financial Provisions ===
Part 3 covers eight articles; article 28 to 35, and pertains to the state's financial provisions, including taxation, the annual publication of financial statements, state government's expenditure and Supply Bills.

=== Part IV - The Public Service ===
Part 4 includes five articles; article 36 to 40, and pertains to the functions and procedures of the Public Service Commission, as well as the impartial treatment of the state government's employees.

=== Part V - General Provisions ===
Part 5 includes eight articles; article 41 to 47, and pertains to General Provisions such as Safeguarding Position of Natives, usage of the public seal, State Flag and State Crest (Coat of arms), as well as the amendment, interpretation and reprinting of the Constitution.

=== Part VI - Transitional Provisions ===
Part 6, which contains eleven articles; article 48 to 59 minus deleted article 58, pertains to Transitional Provisions which took effect upon the establishment of the Malaysian Federation in 1963. Among the issues addressed within Part 6 are all matters of the State prior the formation of Malaysia and relations within the United Kingdom as a Crown Colony such as: the appointment of the first Governor (then known as Yang di-Pertua Negara) of Sabah, the proceedings of the state government during a specified transition period and the transfer of officers.

=== Schedules ===
1. First Schedule: Forms of Oaths and Affirmations
2. Second Schedule: State Flag and State Crest
