= Tawi Sli =

2nd Chief Minister of Sarawak (1966–1970)

Yang Amat Berhormat Dato' Sri Penghulu Tawi Sli Anak Tini PNBS ABS
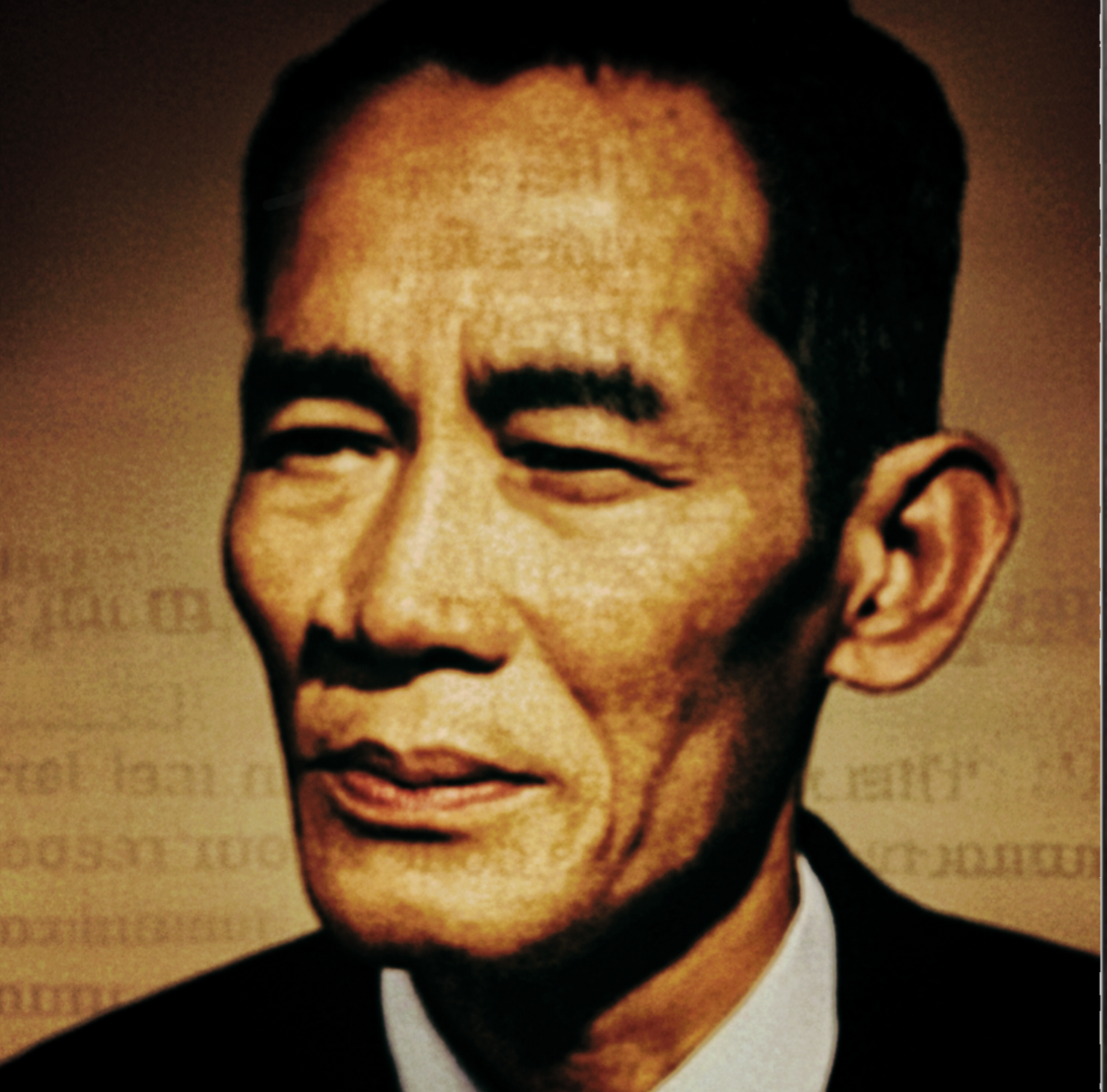

2nd Chief Minister of Sarawak
- In office 23 September 1966 – 7 July 1970
- Governor: Abang Haji Openg; Tuanku Bujang Tuanku Othman
- Deputy: Abang Abdul Rahim (1966-1970)
- Preceded by: Stephen Kalong Ningkan
- Succeeded by: Abdul Rahman Ya'kub

Personal details
- Born: 12 June 1912 Banting, Lingga, Sri Aman, Raj of Sarawak
- Died: 22 December 1987 (aged 75) Kuching, Sarawak, Malaysia
- Party: Sarawak National Party (SNAP) (1963–1966); Parti Pesaka Sarawak (1966–1974)
- Spouse: Datin Sri Dorothy Inti Anak Robert Eddie (Deceased)
- Parent: Tini Anak Enchi (father)
- Occupation: Politician

Dato' Sri Penghulu Tawi Sli Anak Tini (12 June 1912 – 22 December 1987) was the second chief minister of Sarawak.

== Personal life and education ==
Tawi Sli was born in Banting, Lingga, Sri Aman, Sarawak. He hailed from an Anglican family. He received his formal education at St. Thomas school in Kuching until Form 3.

== Early career ==
After school, Tawi Sli worked as a teacher in a mission school while undergoing a three-year training programme to become a pastor. He served as a clerk with the government before he retired in 1961.

== Early political career ==
In 1963, Tawi Sli was appointed as Penghulu and he started to become active in politics. He was the secretary of Sarawak National Party (SNAP) of the Simanggang branch. He later resigned from SNAP and joined Parti Pesaka Sarawak in 1966.

== Appointment to chief minister ==
Tawi Sli was appointed as the chief minister of Sarawak by the then Governor of Sarawak, Abang Haji Openg, during the 1966 Sarawak constitutional crisis on 17 June 1966. Tawi Sli immediately appoint five members into his Supreme Council (equivalent to Sarawak cabinet today) namely: Abdul Taib Mahmud, and Awang Hipni from BARJASA, Umpau and Laing from PESAKA, and Abang Haji Abdul Rahman from PANAS. Two months later, Teo Kui Seng and Ling Beng Siong from SCA were appointed to Supreme Council. Meanwhile, Taib Mahmud became the deputy chief minister and minister of development and forestry. Ningkan's SNAP party withdrew from the Sarawak Alliance. Abdul Rahman Ya'kub retained his federal minister post. Taib Mahmud, Abang Haji Abdul Rahman, and Thomas Kana became advisors for Tawi Sli.

In November 1967, Taib Mahmud resigned from the State Minister of Development after Tun Jugah accused Taib of spending too much money on building suraus and mosques while ignoring the needs of Dayak people. Taib was then appointed as a member of Dewan Rakyat and became Federal Deputy Minister of Commerce and Industry. In 1968, Angkatan Nahdatul Islam Bersatu (BINA) was formed. Abdul Rahman Ya'kub became the chairman of BINA while Taib Mahmud became the treasurer.

=== 1966 Sarawak constitutional crisis ===
Ningkan went to the Kuching High Court, dissatisfied with the Governor's (Abang Haji Openg) action of dismissing him and installing Tawi Sli as the chief minister. The high court declared Ultra vires (beyond the powers) for the actions of the Governor. Eventually, Ningkan was reinstated by the court on 8 September 1966, which saw the necessity of a formal vote of no confidence. Tawi Sli was the chief minister for 3 months (16 June 1966 to 7 September 1966) when the high court made the decision to reinstate Ningkan as chief minister.

Ningkan tried to initiate a dissolution of the state assembly upon his reinstatement. However, the federal government declared state of emergency on 15 September, citing chaos in the state. The federal government then unilaterally amended the Sarawak Constitution to give the power to the state's governor to commence the Council Negri meeting. Vote of no confidence was passed on 24 September and Tawi Sli swore in again as the chief minister.

=== Removal of expatriates from government services ===
On 27 July 1966, Tawi Sli said that there is a need for "an independent country to be administered by its own local officers". During this time, two expatriates were left in the Council Negri (now Sarawak state legislative assembly) namely Tony Shaw and John Pike after a purge by Ningkan from the Supreme Council (today Sarawak cabinet) during the 1965 land bill crisis. Tony Shaw and John Pike were also the former close advisors for Ningkan's government. Tony Shaw was given ten days to leave the state, however, Shaw protested due to inadequate time for preparation. Tawi Sli then announced on 30 July that Shaw would be on leave until the end of August. Shaw will leave Sarawak after a farewell lunch with Tawi Sli on 26 August. Shaw was paid the remainder of his contract compensations. John Pike was on leave overseas when Tawi Sli announced this decision. So John Pike was similarly compensated and was told not to return to Sarawak. Acting chief minister Taib Mahmud then announced that for the remaining 300 expatriate officers in the government, all of their contracts would not be renewed upon expiration. Therefore, by October 1967, all these expatriate officers will be replaced by local personnel. Taib Mahmud was believed to initiate the departure of Tony Shaw and John Pike instead of Tawi Sli himself. Some had viewed the expatriates as an obstacle to fully integrating Sarawak into Malaysia because of the insistence of the expatriates that the Malaysian government should fully comply with every detail of the Inter-government committee (IGC) report to protect Sarawak's interests. Others view the expatriates as obstacles to their own career pathways as the expatriates took away the jobs that are supposed to belong to the locals.

== Honours ==
- Sarawak
  - Member of the Most Exalted Order of the Star of Sarawak (ABS) (1964)
  - Knight Commander of the Most Exalted Order of the Star of Sarawak (PNBS) – Dato' (1967)

== Later life ==
He retired from politics in 1974 and later was involved in business until his death in 1987. His wife, Datin Sri Dorothy Inti, died in April 2015.

Political offices
Preceded by Stephen Kalong Ningkan	Chief Minister of Sarawak; 1966–1970	Succeeded by Abdul Rahman Ya'kub
