= Stephen Kalong Ningkan =

1st Chief Minister of Sarawak (1963–1966)

Yang Berbahagia Tan Sri Datuk Amar Stephen Kalong Ningkan PSM DA PNBS PGDK PPM
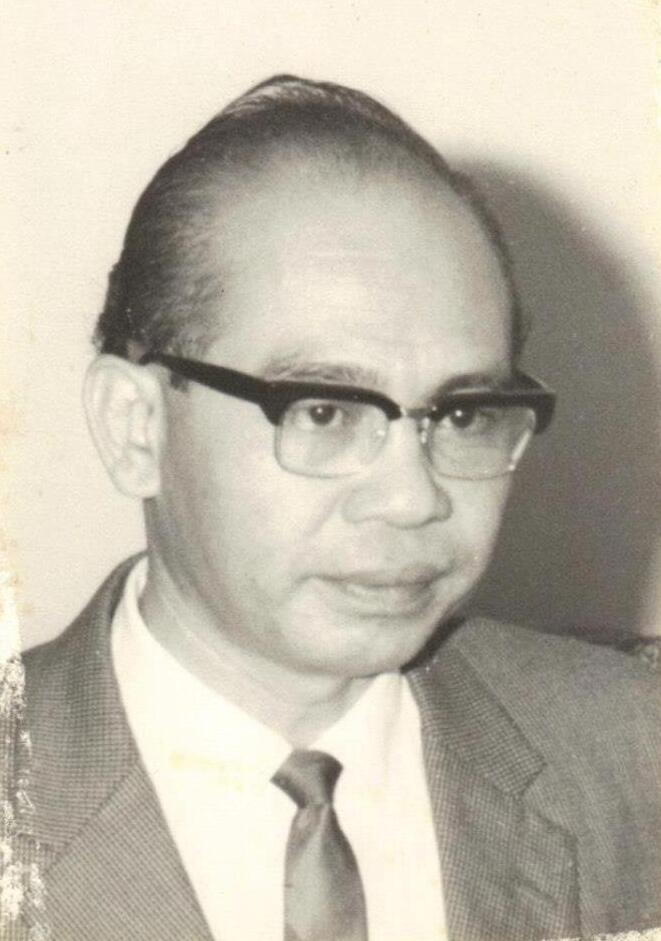

1st Chief Minister of Sarawak
- In office 22 July 1963 – 23 September 1966
- Governor: Sir Alexander Waddell; Abang Openg
- Deputy: James Wong Kim Min
- Preceded by: Office established
- Succeeded by: Tawi Sli

Member of the Sarawak State Legislative Assembly for Layar
- In office 1970–1974
- Preceded by: Constituency created
- Succeeded by: Alfred Jabu Numpang

1st President of the Sarawak National Party
- In office 1961–1974
- Preceded by: Position established
- Succeeded by: Dunstan Endawie Enchana

Chief Minister of Sarawak before Crisis
- In office 1966–1966
- Succeeded by: Tawi Sli

Personal details
- Born: 20 August 1920 Betong, Simanggang, Raj of Sarawak
- Died: 31 March 1997 (aged 76) Kuching, Sarawak, Malaysia
- Citizenship: Malaysian
- Party: Sarawak National Party
- Spouse(s): Elizabeth Sendi (died 1984); Rosalind Ningkan
- Children: Paul Murphy Ningkan; Marina Siew Ling Ningkan; Flora Ningkan; Diana Inoi Ningkan; Winston Beng Wai Ningkan; Margaret Ningkan; Gerald Bala Ningkan
- Parents: Ningkan Anak Igam (father); Kuni anak Karong (mother)
- Profession: Politicians

Stephen Kalong Anak Ningkan (20 August 1920 – 31 March 1997) was a Malaysian politician who served as the first Chief Minister of Sarawak and first ethnic Iban to hold this position from 1963 until his removal from office in 1966.

== Early life and education ==
Stephen Kalong Ningkan was born on 20 August 1920 in Betong, which was administered under the Second Division of Sarawak (later known as Simanggang Division).

Ningkan was a student at St. Augustine's school. After Ningkan completed his education, he worked as a rubber fund clerk from 1938 to 1939. He resigned from his job to join the Sarawak Constabulary from 1940 to 1946. He was a police constable in the year 1942. In 1944, he joined the Services Reconnaissance Department (SRD), an underground movement based in Jesselton (present day Kota Kinabalu). He became a teacher at his former school in Betong from 1947 to 1950.

Ningkan then worked at a Shell hospital in Kuala Belait, Brunei from 1950 to 1961. He also took up law via correspondence from Regent Institute and Metropolitan College at St Albans, London, respectively. At the hospital, he was the chairman of the Shell Dayak Club. He became the founder and president of the Brunei Dayak Association in 1958.

Ningkan's mother, Kuni anak Karong (born 1898), died of stomach complications on 14 June 1969, at the age of 71.

=== Hobbies and interests ===
Ningkan learnt the Japanese language during the Japanese Occupation in Sarawak. The Japanese song, Kuni No Hana (Flower of the Nation) was one of his favourites. He was also spotted for singing Terang Bulan in various government and family functions. Ningkan was a fan of P. Ramlee and Sgt Hassan was one of his favourite movies.

== Early political career ==
Ningkan returned to Betong and established the Sarawak National Party (SNAP) on 10 April 1961, by uniting the Iban people of Saribas. Although he initially did not accept Tunku Abdul Rahman's proposal for the formation of Malaysia, he eventually became a strong supporter of the federation.

Ningkan never completed his law degree because he had to focus on his political activities. He also insisted that his party should be multiracial, given his background of having a Chinese grandfather and friends of various races.

In October 1962, as the SNAP secretary-general, Ningkan launched the Sarawak chapter of the Alliance Party, which consisted of Parti Pesaka Sarawak (PESAKA), Barisan Ra'ayat Jati Sarawak (BARJASA), Parti Negara Sarawak (PANAS) and Sarawak Chinese Association (SCA) in anticipation of the 1963 district council elections. In the election, SNAP under the Sarawak Alliance managed to get the majority of local council seats (i.e., after the support of one independent winner from Binatang by the name of Jimbat Anak Intan from Meradong Scheme B tipped the balance of the number of seats won by the Sarawak Alliance and the opposition pact of SUPP and PANAS). This crucial support, plus other independents, enabled the Alliance to appoint a majority of divisional, state assembly, and parliamentary members. This earned Ningkan the trust to become the first Chief Minister of Sarawak.

== Chief Minister of Sarawak ==
After the conclusion of the 1963 Sarawak district council elections, Ningkan was appointed as the first Chief Minister of Sarawak on 22 July by the then Governor, Sir Alexander Waddell. Supreme Council (equivalent to Sarawak government cabinet today) was also formed with members such as Abdul Taib Mahmud, James Wong Kim Ming, Dunstan Endawie Enchana, Awang Hipni Pengiran Anu and Teo Kui Seng.

The three principal advisers for Stephen Kalong Ningkan were Ting Tung Ming, Tony Shaw, and John Pike. Ting Tung Ming was Sibu Foochow, an SCA party member, and Ningkan's political secretary. Tony Shaw was Cambridge-educated expatriate, who joined Sarawak civil service in 1948 and worked as Sarawak state secretary. John Pike was an Oxford graduate expatriate who join the Sarawak civil service since 1949 and was the former Sarawak state secretary. John Pike, Phillip Pike, and Tony Shaw were the three expatriates within the Supreme Council (equivalent to cabinet ministers today). At the same time, they were also members of the Council Negri (equivalent to members of the state legislative assembly today). The expatriates had agreed to serve the government of Sarawak until 31 August 1967, four years after the formation of Malaysia.

The Ningkan's adopted a three-stage decision-making process. Ningkan first discussed his policy with his three principal advisors. The matter was then forwarded to three other SNAP and SCA ministers. Finally, the policy was discussed in a full cabinet meeting involving two BARJASA members. Abdul Taib Mahmud, as a BARJASA cabinet minister, was dissatisfied because, despite his superior educational background, he was unable to exert much influence in cabinet decision-making, being subordinated to the three expatriate officers in Ningkan's cabinet. Similarly, PANAS, PESAKA and the Malaysian federal counterparts were also sidelined in the state cabinet decision-making.

Therefore, the federal government mooted an idea of opening an UMNO branch in Sarawak, trying to unite the Sarawak Malays from BARJASA and PANAS parties, initially naming it as "United Malaysian Native Organisation" (UMNO). Shortly after the formation of Malaysia in September 1963, Haji Ghazali Jawi visited Sarawak to assess the feasibility of opening an UMNO branch in Sarawak or allowing the merger of PANAS and BARJASA into a separate party that has links to the federal government. The news had led to resignations of several non-Malay members from PANAS and annoyed Ningkan because he was not consulted on such important political maneuvering in the state. In October 1964, the UMNO general assembly decided that opening an UMNO in Sarawak was not feasible because without the support of non-Muslims, the party would not matter much in the state politics. Instead, they suggested the formation of a new party through the merger of BARJASA and PANAS by 1965. PANAS and BARJASA completed merger in 1968 and Parti Bumiputera was formed.

=== 1965 land bill crisis ===
The Brooke government introduced the land zoning system, which classified Sarawak lands into native, mixed, interior, and reserved zones. A hard limit was put on maximum amount of aggregated land, thus avoiding the problem of "exploitation of tenant by landlord". Non-natives can only acquire or develop mixed zone land, where about 1,000 square miles of land (less than 3% of the total area in Sarawak) were owned by the Chinese. Meanwhile, one-sixth of the total land area in Sarawak was under shifting cultivation. Thus, the zoning system prevents the land from being used effectively.

A Land Committee was set up by the colonial government. A report was produced in mid-1962 to "make recommendations as to the measures necessary to ensure the best use of land in the national interest." The report recommended the safeguard of native customary rights of land ownership and the abolition of land zoning system. One of the safeguards was that a native could not sell his land without the approval of the Divisional Resident. However, permission criteria were not clearly defined and could be prone to corruption. Thus, the Sarawak government decided to implement the Land Committee recommendations by introducing more specifications in the upcoming Land Bills in the Council Negri.

In December 1963, Land Code (Amendment) Bill was passed in the Council Negri, establishing free issue of land title under Native Customary Rights (NCR) lands. Building upon the Land Code (Amendment) Bill, the Sarawak government introduced three other bills, on matters pertaining to establishing ownership, protecting NCR holdings, and how the government could acquire and pay compensation for NCR land. The contents of the three bills were published for public discussion in February 1964. The aim of these bills was to develop the NCR lands for large-scale plantations by landless Chinese farmers, thus helping to combat communist insurgency at that time. Besides, safeguards were also written to protect native interests. The bills were to be tabled in the Council Negri on 11 March 1965 but was postponed to 11 May to make time for amendment of Land (Native Dealings) Bill.

However, the natives also considered themselves short of land due to their practice of shifting cultivation. The introduction of such land bills benefits the Chinese and worsens the position of the natives, where they would need to abandon their tradition of shifting cultivation for intensive farming.

On 10 May 1965, PANAS, PESAKA, and BARJASA formed Sarawak Native Alliance, with Temenggung Jugah as the president, Abdul Taib Mahmud (BARJASA) and Thomas Kana (PESAKA) as joint secretaries. Haji Su'ut bin Tahir, president of Barisan Pemuda Sarawak, opposed the land bill. On 11 May 1965, BARJASA and PESAKA withdrew from Sarawak Alliance. The withdrawal cost the Sarawak Alliance 22 out of 39 seats in the Council Negri, thus threatening the integrity of the Sarawak government. Ningkan quickly withdrew the land bill on the same day and the crisis was averted. In the news, the bill was reported to be withdrawn on "strong opposition by Malays and Dayak communities", without any mention of withdrawal of BARJASA and PESAKA from the Sarawak Alliance. After the incident, John Pike advised Ningkan to remove ex officio member expatriates, that is John Pike himself, Tony Shaw, and attorney general Philip Pike from the Supreme Council and replace them with three new ministries to be filled by local politicians. The bill to remove the three Supreme Council members was tabled on 12 May 1965 and passed on 13 May. PESAKA withdrew its resignation from Sarawak Alliance in writing immediately after the withdrawal of the land bill. Ningkan then announced that the two vacant seats left by the expatriates would be filled by PESAKA and the remaining one seat would be filled by PANAS. Meanwhile, Ningkan accepted the resignation of BERJASA from the Sarawak Alliance, and BARJASA would need to give up its two ministerial posts in the government. However, Abdul Rahman Ya'kub, a leader from BARJASA, argued that BARJASA too had withdrawn their resignation by telephone. Despite this, Ningkan denied receiving any phone call from BARJASA.

On 18 May, Ningkan was supposed to fly to Kuala Lumpur to attend a roundtable meeting with the prime minister of Malaysia Tun Abdul Razak and four other PESAKA leaders to solve the Sarawak government crisis. However, Ningkan refused to go to Kuala Lumpur, stating that "Sarawak crisis must be settled in Sarawak". Ningkan instead attended a meeting with Tun Jugah (leader of PESAKA) in Sibu on 21 May 1965. PESAKA decided to withdraw its support from Sarawak Native Alliance and rejoin the Ningkan's Sarawak Alliance. In the end, Ningkan decided to compromise and allow PANAS and BARJASA to rejoin Sarawak Alliance. Ningkan informed Tun Razak of his decision. After this incident, Abdul Rahman Ya'kub retained his federal minister post while Abdul Taib Mahmud and Awang Hipni were reinstated to their respective state ministerial posts.

=== Removal of expatriates from government service ===
Unions in Sarawak and the federal government constantly pressure the Sarawak government to replace all expatriates in Sarawak. For example, Sarawak Government Asian Officers Union (SGAOU) wrote a letter to Ningkan in 1965, stated that retaining expatriates in government posts "tended to discredit the position of the country in the eyes of the outside world". Nine months later, Tunku Abdul Rahman supported SGAOU's view, saying the Sarawak administration was still colonial in nature. Three expatriates were removed from the Supreme Council during the land bill crisis in 1965. Ningkan explained in April 1966 that "we have men ready for all the top posts ... if I am able to obtain 100% support from the federal government in giving away money ... then I can ... let them go with compensation".

=== Tackling communist insurgency ===
Ningkan had a strong anti-communist stand during his tenure as chief minister. Sarawak United Peoples' Party (SUPP) was still an opposition party when Ningkan was in office. He had ordered the closure of several SUPP branches in Lundu, Sarikei and Jakar, citing infiltration of these branches by the communists. In August 1965, Singapore was separated from Malaysia. Stephen Yong Kuet Tze, the then SUPP secretary-general, proposed revising the terms of Sarawak's incorporation into Malaysia. Although there are valid questions about the legitimacy of the Constitution of Malaysia after Singapore was expelled, Yong's sentiments coincided with the communist objectives of seceding Sarawak from Malaysia. Such sentiment angered Ningkan, and he warned the party not to "echo any Communist slogan" or the government would act swiftly against the party. He also told SUPP not to make any suggestions "that will distract the people from our immediate goal of destroying internal communist subversion."

During the administration of Ningkan, various anti-communist operations were conducted by Malaysian and British troops, and on 6 July 1965, Operation Hammer was started to resettle the Chinese living along the 10th to 25th mile along the Kuching-Serian road into a village fenced with barbed wire. A total of 50,000 Chinese were resettled. Operation Letterbox was also started to allow the Chinese in the resettled areas to fill in questionnaires providing information about the communist activities in the area.

=== Opposition to national language policy ===
In February 1966, Tunku Abdul Rahman visited Kapit and persudaded the Iban population there to accept the Malay language as the medium of communication. He also stressed that there is not much difference between the Malay language and the Iban language. In the 1966 presidential address to the UMNO party, Tunku Abdul Rahman stated the need for the Malay language as a unifying language of the federation and asserted that "the target date to make the national language as the official language of Sarawak had been agreed upon".

However, Ningkan opposed the National Language and Education policies. He suggested to the Malaysian federal government that the introduction of the Malay language should be deferred from 1967 to 1973, which is a grace period of 10 years after the formation of Malaysia. Stephen Kalong Ningkan also mentioned that Sarawak had a grace period of 10 years after the formation of Malaysia to decide whether to adopt the Malay language as the official language of Sarawak. Tunku Abdul Rahman, then mentioned that Ningkan had a "hidden motive" although "90 percent of the Dayaks can speak this language (Malay) and less than 1 percent has a good knowledge of the English language." Tunku also stated that the Dayaks who wanted English as the permanent official language were influenced by the "British imperialists to separate Dayaks and Ibans from the Malay" and "Malaysia should not become a bastard nation" by adopting English as the official language.

== Constitutional crisis and removal from power ==
On 12 June 1966, Ningkan announced his dismissal of Abdul Taib Mahmud, the Minister of Communications and Works from the supreme council citing of loss of confidence in Taib. Ningkan also took note of a plan by a rebel group of leaders to topple him. Meanwhile, PESAKA secretary-general Thomas Kana confirmed Ningkan's claim by stating that Ningkan's party has lost the confidence of the majority of the members of Council Negri, therefore, should resign from his chief minister post. Kana also advised that 20 members of the Council Negri should boycott the Council Negri meeting which was scheduled on 14 June. The governor of Sarawak, Abang Haji Openg, together with Temenggong Jugah, Taib Mahmud, and other dissident politicians went to Kuala Lumpur on 13 June for a meeting. On 14 June, Tunku Abdul Rahman, said he received a letter from the majority of the Council Negri members asking Ningkan to resign. Tunku also stated that charges against Ningkan would not be revealed if Ningkan decided to resign from the chief minister's post.

Since the procedure of a vote of no confidence in the Council Negri was the only proper way of removing a chief minister from office, Ningkan refused to resign. Ningkan went to the Council Negri meeting on 14 June which was attended by 21 members. It consisted of six SNAP members, five SUPP members, three SCA members, two PANAS members, one Machinda party member, one independent member, and three ex-officio members where two of them were expatriates, which was technically a majority. Undeterred by Ningkan's show of strength, the Alliance Party in Kuala Lumpur nominated Tawi Sli as the next chief minister on 15 June.

On 16 June, Tun Ismail, the Malaysian Home Minister, ferried all the defectors, including Tun Jugah, Taib Mahmud, and other members of BARJASA and PESAKA to Kuching. They were kept in isolation inside a house overnight to keep away outside influences from affecting the members' decisions. On 17 June, governor Abang Haji Openg announced that Ningkan and all of his Supreme Council members ceased to hold office and Tawi Sli was appointed as the new chief minister. Tun Ismail also claimed the governor's action was constitutional.

Dissatisfied with the governor's action, Ningkan took the case to the Kuching High Court. The high court declared Ultra vires (beyond the powers) for the actions of governor Abang Haji Openg. Eventually, Ningkan was reinstated by the court on 8 September 1966, which saw the necessity of a formal vote of no confidence. Chief Justice of Borneo Justice Harley in his judgment ruled that the governor can only dismiss the Chief Minister when both of these conditions are satisfied: the Chief Minister has lost the confidence of the House, and the Chief Minister has refused to resign and failed to advise a dissolution.

Upon his reinstatement as the chief minister, Ningkan and SUPP tried to initiate a dissolution of the Council Negri to seek a fresh mandate from the voters, but the federal government decided to impose a state of emergency in Sarawak, citing chaos in the state. Yang di-Pertuan Agong announced on 14 September that a state of emergency was proclaimed in Sarawak under Article 150 of Constitution of Malaysia. On 20 September, the Malaysian parliament met in a special session and passed the "Emergency (Federal Constitution and Constitution of Sarawak) Act, 1966. This action enabled the federal government unilaterally amended the Sarawak Constitution to give the power to the state's governor to commence the Council Negri meeting.

A vote of non-confidence was passed in the Council Negri on 23 September 1966, and this resulted in the removal of Ningkan from the chief minister's office for the second time.

== Aftermath ==
On 27 September 1966, Ningkan threatened to pull Sarawak out of Malaysia if certain autonomy demands such as information, broadcasting, and customs were not fulfilled by the federal government. Ningkan believed in forming the North Borneo Confederation, which consisted of Sabah, Sarawak, and Brunei. He also believed that the British, Australia, and New Zealand could be persuaded to provide military protection to independent Sarawak. An independent Sarawak could enable a closer political and economic cooperation with Singapore. Ningkan had a main support base in Second Division of Sarawak. Ningkan, claiming to control four out of five divisional councils in Sarawak, was trying persuade his supporters to declare no confidence in the new chief minister Tawi Sli.

Ningkan then decided to take the case to the Federal Court of Malaysia. He argued that the amendment to the Sarawak constitution was illegal because the state of emergency was declared in extraordinary circumstances. On 1 December 1967, Ong Hock Thye, chief judge of Malaya determined that Yang di-Pertuan Agong has the absolute power to decide on the declaration of emergency, the parliament of Malaysia has the power the amend the constitution of Sarawak based on Article 150 of the federal constitution without consulting the governor of Sarawak. Meanwhile, there is not enough evidence to suggest that the declaration of emergency was done without the consideration of the security situation in Sarawak.

Dissatisfied with the federal court judgement, Ningkan brought the case to the Judicial Committee of the Privy Council. On 1 August 1968, the Judicial Committee of the Privy Council rejected Ningkan's appeal. Lord MacDermott said that "their Lordships could not find any reason for saying that the emergency was not grave and did not threaten the security of Sarawak."

Alastair Morrison, an expatriate information officer serving in Sarawak, commented that Ningkan style of politics has offended many people as other native members (bumputera) of the Sarawak Alliance felt that Ningkan was too closely linked to Chinese business interests and also had a competing interest in timber licenses. Alastair Morrison also said that "the chief minister ... became estranged from much native opinion through his often autocratic behaviour" and "his personal conduct continued to give offense; his popularity and standing declined". However, Ningkan attributed his own downfall to his refusal to submit to the pressure of the federal government to make the Malay language the official language of Sarawak.

Ningkan continued to participate in state politics as an opposition member of the Council Negri until 1974.

Initially, Ningkan started a business dealing with cement.

== Death ==
Ningkan died on 31 March 1997, at the age of 76, at the Normah Specialist Medical Centre in Kuching. His funeral was held at St. Thomas Cathedral, and he was buried at the Anglican Cemetery at Jalan Batu Kitang. The lyrics of Terang Bulan were engraved on the back of his tombstone.

== Legacy ==
=== Namesakes ===
Several places were named after him, including:

- Dewan Sukan Tan Sri Datuk Amar Stephen Kalong Ningkan, a multipurpose hall in Betong, Sarawak
- Jalan Datuk Amar Kalong Ningkan, a road in Kuching, Sarawak
- Jalan Ningkan, a road in Sri Aman, Sarawak

== Honours ==
=== Honours of Malaysia ===
- Malaysia
  - Commander of the Order of Loyalty to the Crown of Malaysia (PSM) – Tan Sri (1995)
  - Recipient of the Malaysian Commemorative Medal (Gold) (PPM (E)) (1965)
- Sabah
  - Commander of the Order of Kinabalu (PGDK) – Datuk (1964)
- Sarawak
  - Knight Commander of the Order of the Star of Hornbill Sarawak (DA) – Datuk Amar (1988)
  - Knight Commander of the Most Exalted Order of the Star of Sarawak (PNBS) – Dato' (1964)

Political offices
New office	Chief Minister of Sarawak; 1963–1966	Succeeded by Tawi Sli
