= Abang Openg =

Malaysian politician (1905–1969)

Yang Amat Berbahagia Tun Dato' Abang Openg Abang Sapiee SMN PNBS PPM OBE
- ابڠ حاج اوڤيڠ ابڠ شافعي
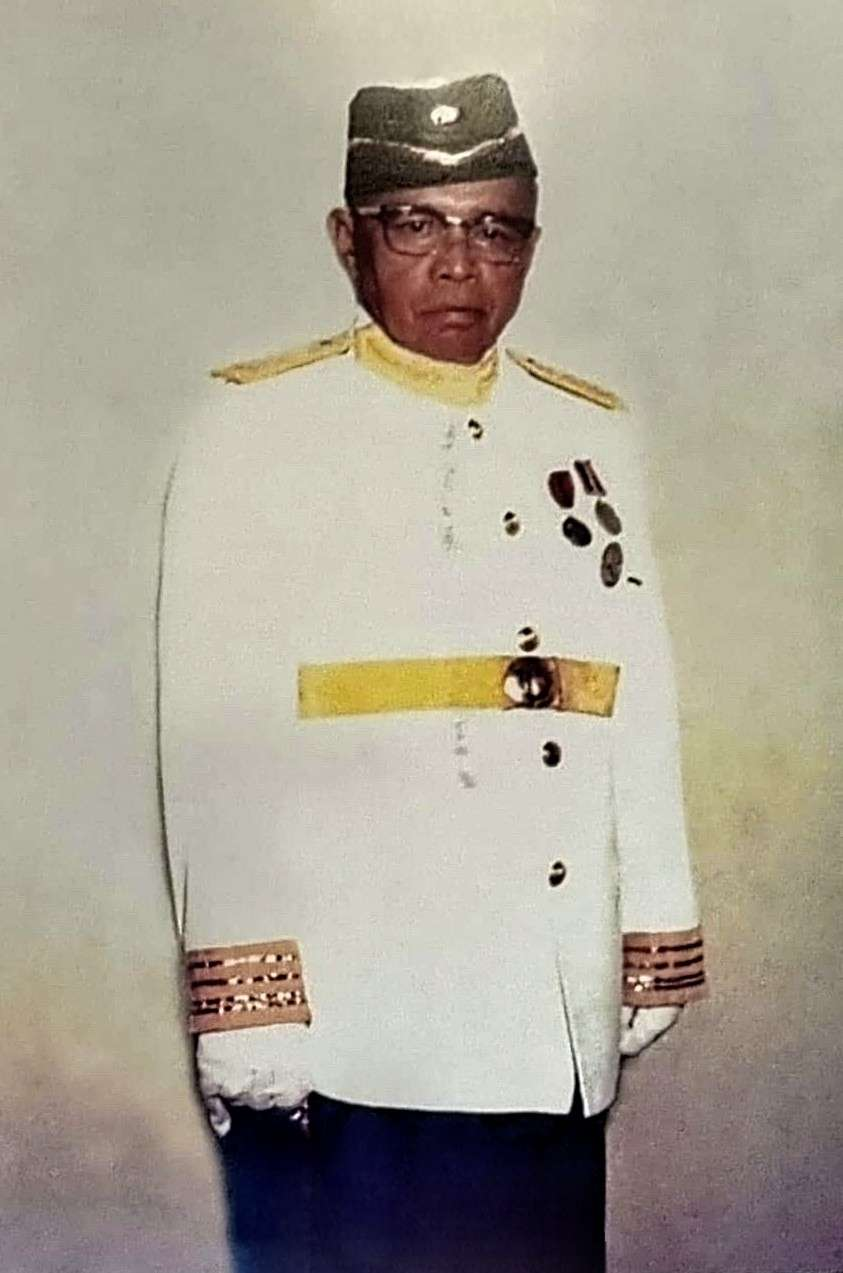

1st Yang di-Pertua Negeri of Sarawak
- In office 16 September 1963 – 28 March 1969
- Chief Minister: Stephen Kalong Ningkan; Tawi Sli
- Preceded by: Position established
- Succeeded by: Tuanku Bujang Tuanku Othman

Personal details
- Born: 7 October 1905 Kuching, Raj of Sarawak, British Empire
- Died: 28 March 1969 (aged 63) Kuching, Sarawak, Malaysia
- Spouse: Dayang Masniah Abdul Rahman
- Children: 10 (including Abang Abdul Rahman Zohari)
- Relatives: Datu Patinggi Ali (great-grandfather)

Abang Openg bin Abang Sapiee (Jawi: ابڠ حاج اوڤيڠ بن ابڠ شافعي; 7 October 1905 – 28 March 1969) was a Malaysian politician who served as the first Yang di-Pertua Negeri of Sarawak from September 1963 to his death in March 1969. He assumed the newly established post following Sarawak's independence from Great Britain and the formation of Malaysia in 1963. He was one of two candidates proposed by Tunku Abdul Rahman, after being recommended by the Malay National Union. He is the father to Abang Abdul Rahman Zohari Abang Openg, the current Premier of Sarawak.

== Early life and education ==
Abang Openg was born on 7 October 1905 in Kampung Bandarsah, Kuching, Kingdom of Sarawak, during the White Rajahs of Brooke dynasty's rule. He came from a Malay family with historical involvement in local leadership. His ancestry included Datu Patinggi Ali and Datu Patinggi Abdul Ghafur, who held leadership positions during the Brooke administration in Sarawak.

Growing up in an era when educational opportunities for Bumiputeras were scarce, Abang Openg faced the challenge of limited formal schooling. Despite these obstacles, he attended the Government Malay School in Kuching. At that time, formal education opportunities for Bumiputera were limited.

== Early career ==
At the age of 19, in 1924, Abang Openg started his career in public service as a government clerk. He was later transferred to the Office of Native Affairs, a department responsible for the administration and welfare of indigenous communities. He subsequently received a promotion.

In 1932, Abang Openg was appointed as a government officer in Sarikei. While working in there, he attended night classes at St. Anthony's School, taking Junior Cambridge lessons to further his education.

By 1940, Abang Openg held the position of Native Officer, which included the powers of a Class III Magistrate with legal authority in local governance. In 1941, Rajah Sir Charles Vyner Brooke appointed him as a member of the Council Negeri (State Council), the legislative body of Sarawak. He served in this role until 1963.

Abang Openg chose to be loyal to the Brooke dynasty's rule until the Japanese surrender in September 1945. When Vyner decided to cede Sarawak to Britain, Abang Openg and several other Brooke officials opposed the decision.

== Illness and death ==
Abang Openg later developed serious health problems, including fatigue, difficulty breathing and weight loss. His condition subsequently deteriorated, limiting his activities and causing him to spend much of his time at the Astana. He received modern medical treatment and also sought traditional treatment. In early March 1969, a traditional medicine practitioner from Indonesia was brought to the Astana, but the treatment was unsuccessful. He was subsequently diagnosed with colon cancer. His condition became critical in late March 1969. On 27 March, Prime Minister Tunku Abdul Rahman visited him in Sarawak. Tunku stated that the visit was "not for politics nor to meddle in any affairs in Sarawak. I'm here to see my dear friend." On 28 March, Abang Openg died at 10:30 p.m at the Astana, aged 64.

Following his death, his remains were prepared in accordance with Islamic funeral rites and customs. Funeral prayers were performed at the Astana before the coffin, draped in the Sarawak flag, was transported by a special ferry from the Astana jetty to Pangkalan Batu. The remains were then transported by gun carriage to the Sarawak State Mosque with police and military personnel accompanying the procession and members of the public lining the route.

After the funeral prayer at the mosque, Abang Openg was buried in the cemetery adjacent to the mosque. The funeral was attended by members of his family, Sarawak and federal leaders, representatives of the Sabah government, senior government officials and members of the public.

== Honours ==
=== Honours of Malaysia ===
- Malaysia
  - Grand Commander of the Order of the Defender of the Realm (SMN) – Tun (1964)
- Sarawak
  - Knight Commander of the Most Exalted Order of the Star of Sarawak (PNBS) – Dato,' now Dato Sri (1954)

=== British Commonwealth honour ===
- United Kingdom
  - Officer of the Order of the British Empire (OBE) (1962)

== Namesakes ==
Several places were named after Abang Openg, including:

- Tun Abang Haji Openg Digital Centre (TAHODC) in UNIMAS Samarahan, the main centre for information and communication technology (ICT) in the university
- SMK Tun Abang Haji Openg, a secondary school in Kuching
- Jalan Tun Abang Haji Openg in Kuching
- Jalan Tun Abang Haji Openg in Sibu
- Jalan Tun Openg in Tanjung Kidurong, Bintulu
- Jalan Abang Haji Openg in Taman Tun Dr Ismail, Kuala Lumpur

Political offices
New creation	Yang di-Pertua Negeri Sarawak; 1963–1969	Succeeded by Tuanku Bujang Tuanku Othman
