= Premier of Sarawak =

Head of government of Sarawak

- Premier Sarawak
- Coat of arms of Sarawak

- Flag of Sarawak

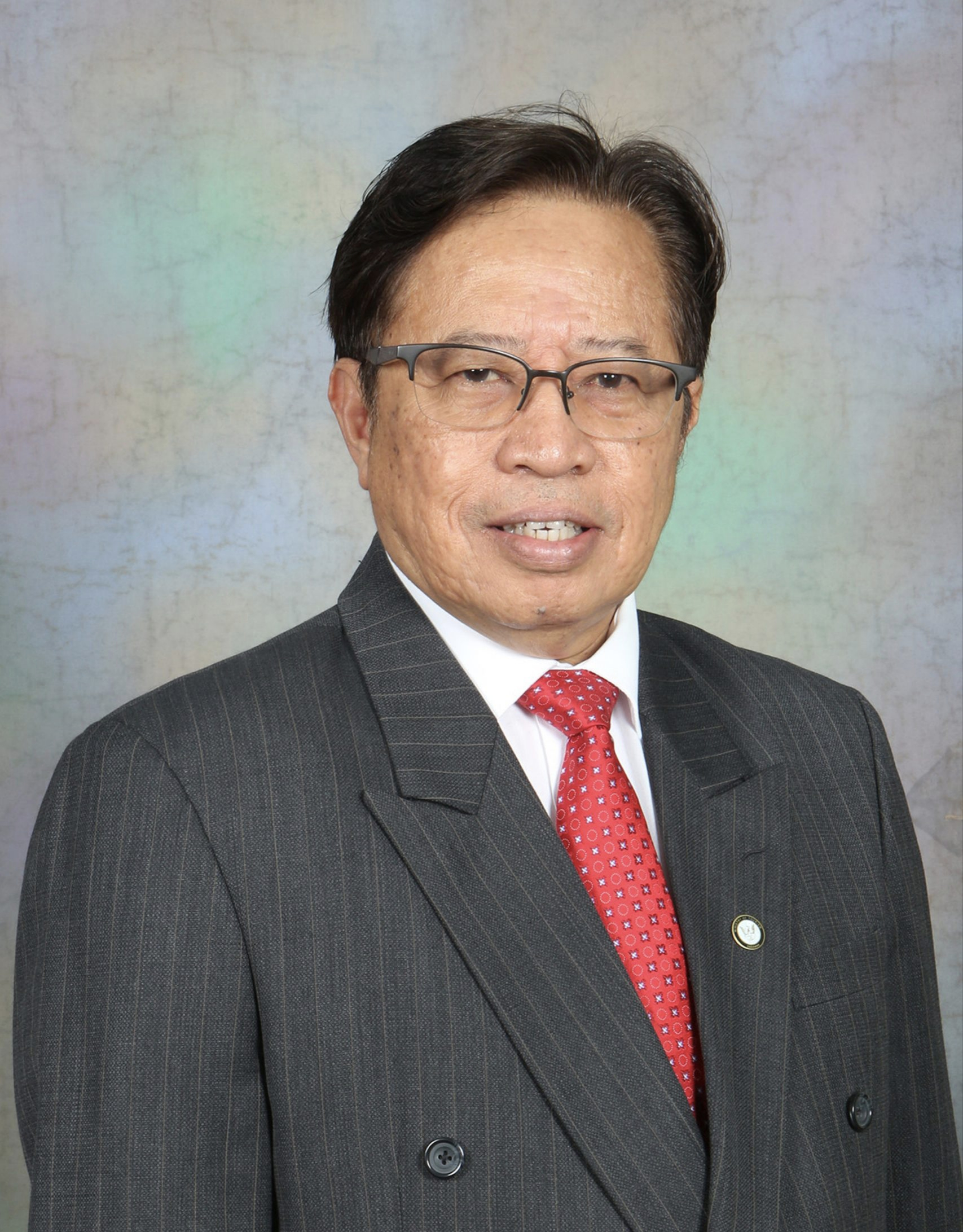
- Incumbent; Abang Johari since 13 January 2017
- Government of Sarawak; Premier's Department
- Style: Premier (informal); Yang Amat Berhormat (formal); The Right Honourable (Commonwealth); His Excellency (diplomatic)
- Status: Head of government
- Member of: Cabinet; Premier's Department; State Legislative Assembly
- Reports to: Sarawak State Legislative Assembly
- Seat: Satria Pertiwi Complex, Petra Jaya, Kuching
- Appointer: Governor of Sarawak
- Term length: Five years, renewable
- Constituting instrument: Constitution of Sarawak
- Precursor: Chief Minister of Sarawak
- Inaugural holder: Stephen Kalong Ningkan (as Chief Minister); Abang Abdul Rahman Zohari Abang Openg (as Premier)
- Formation: 22 July 1963 (as Chief Minister); 1 March 2022 (as Premier)
- Deputy: Deputy Premier of Sarawak
- Website: premier.sarawak.gov.my

The premier of Sarawak (Malay: Premier Sarawak), formerly known as the chief minister of Sarawak (Malay: Ketua Menteri Sarawak), is the head of government and the highest executive authority of the Malaysian state of Sarawak. The premier leads the Government of Sarawak, which forms the executive branch of the state administration. Appointment to the position is made by the Yang di-Pertua Negeri, the constitutional governor of Sarawak. The office is conventionally given to the leader of the political party or coalition that commands a majority in the Sarawak State Legislative Assembly.

Following a constitutional amendment passed on 15 February 2022, the title of chief minister was formally changed to premier to reflect Sarawak's status as an equal partner within the Federation of Malaysia under the Malaysia Agreement 1963. The amendment was gazetted and came into force on 1 March 2022. Abang Johari has served as the head of government of Sarawak since 13 January 2017, first as Chief Minister and later as Premier following the redesignation of the office on 1 March 2022.

As of 2026, in the Malaysian federal order of precedence, the premier of Sarawak ranks fourth, immediately after the prime minister and the two deputy prime ministers. (Note: This order of precedence is used in official national ceremonies and determines the order of protocol between high-ranking government officials.)

== History ==
The post of Premier of Sarawak was created as Chief Minister of Sarawak on 22 July 1963 when Sarawak was given self-government, with Stephen Kalong Ningkan being the first inaugural to lead the office.

A proposal to change the title of chief minister to premier was made in February 2022, as an aspect of Sarawak's efforts to reclaim its rights under the 1963 Malaysia Agreement (MA63). In addition, the proposal was to avoid comparisons between Sarawak and other states like Penang and Malacca, which also have a chief minister to lead their state government. Along with Britain, Singapore, the Federation of Malaya, and Sabah, Sarawak was one of the signatories of MA63 during the formation of Malaysia.

On 15 February, the position of chief minister was changed to premier following a successful amendment to the Sarawak state constitution. The constitutional amendment was gazetted and came into effect on 1 March. Abang Abdul Rahman Zohari Abang Openg, who had previously served as the sixth chief minister before the post was rebranded, became the first premier of Sarawak. "Premier" was stated to be the official word in both English and Malay. The title Premier was a chosen as a symbolic action following the 2021 amendment to the Constitution of Malaysia, emphasising Sarawak's differentiation from states in West Malaysia. The word is used in other subnational political systems, such as Canada and Australia. Some opposition was raised due to the potential conflation of "Premier" with "Prime Minister". Proposals to rename the position to "Prime Minister" have been rejected by the state government.

== Appointment ==
The process of appointing a premier is fully regulated under Article 6(3) of the constitution of Sarawak. The appointment of a premier is a discretionary power vested in the Yang di-Pertua Negeri of Sarawak (governor). Under Article 10(2)(a), this function may be exercised by the governor at his own discretion without the need to act in accordance with the advice of the state executive council.

Pursuant to Article 6(3)(a), the governor is required to appoint a member of the state legislative assembly who, in his judgment, is likely to command the confidence of the majority of the members of the state legislative assembly.

The constitution imposes strict restrictions on the citizenship status of the holder of this office. Under Article 6(4), a person who is a citizen of Malaysia by naturalisation is disqualified from being appointed as premier. Therefore, the appointee must be a citizen by operation of law rather than by naturalisation.

Once appointed, the premier is subject to strict restrictions concerning integrity and conflicts of interest. Under Article 6(5), the premier shall not hold any office of profit and shall not actively participate in any commercial enterprise.

Before exercising the functions of the office, an appointed premier is required by law to take and subscribe the oath of office. Under Article 8, the premier must take and sign the oath before the governor in accordance with the prescribed form:

"I [state your name], having been appointed to hold office as Premier, do hereby swear that I will faithfully, fairly and to the best of my ability discharge the duties of my office; that I will bear true allegiance to the State of Sarawak and the Federation of Malaysia; and that I will preserve, protect and defend the Constitution of the State of Sarawak and the Federal Constitution; and that I will not disclose or explain directly or indirectly to any person any matter which may be submitted to my consideration or which may come to my knowledge as a member of the Sarawak State Executive Council, except as may be required for the discharge of those duties or with the special permission of the Yang di-Pertua Negeri."

== Powers and prerogatives ==
Under the constitution of Sarawak, the premier possesses a number of constitutional powers and prerogatives.

The premier has the authority to determine the composition and membership of the state executive council (cabinet). Under Article 6(3)(b), the governor may appoint ministers, numbering not fewer than four and not more than 10, only on the advice of the premier.

Under Article 7A(1), the premier also has the power to advise the governor on the appointment of deputy ministers from among the members of the state legislative assembly. Although deputy ministers are not constitutionally members of the state executive council, Article 7A(1)(b) empowers the premier to invite any deputy minister to attend cabinet meetings whenever necessary. Pursuant to Article 7A(2), deputy ministers assist the premier and the ministers in the discharge of their duties and are subject to the general or special directions of the premier and the respective ministers.

Under Article 7(2), a minister, other than the premier, may be removed from office by the governor acting on the advice of the premier. This power likewise extends to deputy ministers under Article 7A(3).

Under Article 9(1), the premier has the power to advise the governor on the allocation or transfer of responsibility for any matter relating to the business of the state government, including the administration of any government department, to any minister.

Under the proviso to Article 9(2), the premier may also grant formal approval for any member of the state executive council or any deputy minister to hold a non-executive position in a company or corporation in which the state government has an equity interest or other interest.

Under Article 11, the state secretary, the state attorney-general, and the state financial secretary are appointed by the governor acting on the advice of the premier, after the premier has selected candidates from a list submitted by the relevant commission and consulted the federal government.

Under Article 15(1), the premier also has the power to advise the governor on the appointment of the speaker of the state legislative assembly from among the members of the state legislative assembly or persons qualified for election as members of the state legislative assembly, and the deputy speaker from among the members of the state legislative assembly. Under Article 15(2)(d), the office of the speaker or deputy speaker may be vacated if the governor so decides, acting on the advice of the premier.

Under Articles 7(1) and 10(2)(b), the premier also has the constitutional power to request the governor to dissolve the state legislative assembly. However, the governor retains the discretion to grant or refuse such a request.

Under Article 10(1), as the governor is generally required to act on the advice of the cabinet, the constitution provides that the cabinet, headed by the premier, is entitled, upon request, to obtain any information relating to the administration of the state government.

== Acting premier of Sarawak ==
The appointment of an acting premier (Pemangku Premier Sarawak) will only be implemented if a premier is confirmed to be ill for a long period of time, or died while serving in the government administration. To appoint an acting premier, he must have extensive experience in politics, economics, legal affairs, social affairs & people's unity, education, science & technology, sports, and religious affairs. There is no obstacle for any local leaders from various races, to hold the position as acting premier of Sarawak.

The appointment period of the acting premier will only be given for 80 days only, until the consent of the Yang di-Pertua Negeri Sarawak to fully implement the appointment of the new premier of Sarawak, on the condition that through the selection method of the new Sarawak government cabinet lineup, namely through government cabinet elections, or as directly using state government elections.

== List ==
=== Chief ministers of Sarawak (1963–2022) ===
Colour key (for political coalitions):
Sarawak Alliance PESAKA Barisan Nasional Gabungan Parti Sarawak

No.	Portrait	Name (Birth–Death) Constituency	Term of office			Party (Note: This column names only the Chief Minister's party. The state government he heads may be a coalition of several parties and independents; those are not listed here.)	Election	Assembly
No.	Portrait	Name (Birth–Death) Constituency	Took office	Left office	Time in office	Party	Election	Assembly
1		Tan Sri Datuk Amar Stephen Kalong Ningkan; MLA for Layar (1920–1997)	22 July 1963	23 September 1966	3 years, 63 days	Alliance (SNAP)	1963	–
2		Dato' Sri Penghulu Tawi Sli; MLA for Lingga-Sebuyau (1912–1987)	23 September 1966	7 July 1970	3 years, 287 days	PESAKA	–	–
3		Tun Datuk Patinggi; Abdul Rahman Ya'kub; MLA for Kuala Rajang (1928–2015)	7 July 1970	26 March 1981	10 years, 262 days	Alliance (BUMIPUTERA)	1969	8th
3		Tun Datuk Patinggi; Abdul Rahman Ya'kub; MLA for Kuala Rajang (1928–2015)	7 July 1970	26 March 1981	10 years, 262 days	BN (PBB)	1974	9th
3		Tun Datuk Patinggi; Abdul Rahman Ya'kub; MLA for Kuala Rajang (1928–2015)	7 July 1970	26 March 1981	10 years, 262 days	BN (PBB)	1979	10th
4		Tun Pehin Sri; Abdul Taib Mahmud; MLA for Sebandi (until 1991); MLA for Asajaya (1991–2001); MLA for Balingian (from 2001) (1936–2024)	26 March 1981	28 February 2014	32 years, 339 days	BN (PBB)	–	–
4		Tun Pehin Sri; Abdul Taib Mahmud; MLA for Sebandi (until 1991); MLA for Asajaya (1991–2001); MLA for Balingian (from 2001) (1936–2024)	26 March 1981	28 February 2014	32 years, 339 days	BN (PBB)	1983	11th
4		Tun Pehin Sri; Abdul Taib Mahmud; MLA for Sebandi (until 1991); MLA for Asajaya (1991–2001); MLA for Balingian (from 2001) (1936–2024)	26 March 1981	28 February 2014	32 years, 339 days	BN (PBB)	1987	12th
4		Tun Pehin Sri; Abdul Taib Mahmud; MLA for Sebandi (until 1991); MLA for Asajaya (1991–2001); MLA for Balingian (from 2001) (1936–2024)	26 March 1981	28 February 2014	32 years, 339 days	BN (PBB)	1991	13th
4		Tun Pehin Sri; Abdul Taib Mahmud; MLA for Sebandi (until 1991); MLA for Asajaya (1991–2001); MLA for Balingian (from 2001) (1936–2024)	26 March 1981	28 February 2014	32 years, 339 days	BN (PBB)	1996	14th
4		Tun Pehin Sri; Abdul Taib Mahmud; MLA for Sebandi (until 1991); MLA for Asajaya (1991–2001); MLA for Balingian (from 2001) (1936–2024)	26 March 1981	28 February 2014	32 years, 339 days	BN (PBB)	2001	15th
4		Tun Pehin Sri; Abdul Taib Mahmud; MLA for Sebandi (until 1991); MLA for Asajaya (1991–2001); MLA for Balingian (from 2001) (1936–2024)	26 March 1981	28 February 2014	32 years, 339 days	BN (PBB)	2006	16th
4		Tun Pehin Sri; Abdul Taib Mahmud; MLA for Sebandi (until 1991); MLA for Asajaya (1991–2001); MLA for Balingian (from 2001) (1936–2024)	26 March 1981	28 February 2014	32 years, 339 days	BN (PBB)	2011	17th
5		Tan Sri Pehin Sri; Adenan Satem; MLA for Tanjong Datu (1944–2017)	1 March 2014	11 January 2017	2 years, 316 days	BN (PBB)	–	–
5		Tan Sri Pehin Sri; Adenan Satem; MLA for Tanjong Datu (1944–2017)	1 March 2014	11 January 2017	2 years, 316 days	BN (PBB)	2016	18th
6		Tan Sri Datuk Patinggi; Abang Abdul Rahman Zohari Abang Openg (born 1950); MLA for Satok (until 2021); MLA for Gedong (from 2021)	13 January 2017	1 March 2022	5 years, 47 days	BN (PBB)	–	18th
6		Tan Sri Datuk Patinggi; Abang Abdul Rahman Zohari Abang Openg (born 1950); MLA for Satok (until 2021); MLA for Gedong (from 2021)	13 January 2017	1 March 2022	5 years, 47 days	GPS (PBB)	–	–
6		Tan Sri Datuk Patinggi; Abang Abdul Rahman Zohari Abang Openg (born 1950); MLA for Satok (until 2021); MLA for Gedong (from 2021)	13 January 2017	1 March 2022	5 years, 47 days	GPS (PBB)	2021	19th

=== Premiers of Sarawak (2022–present) ===
Colour key (for political coalitions):
Gabungan Parti Sarawak

No.	Portrait	Name (Birth–Death) Constituency	Term of office			Party (Note: This column names only the Premier's party. The state government he heads may be a coalition of several parties and independents; those are not listed here.)	Election	Assembly
No.	Portrait	Name (Birth–Death) Constituency	Took office	Left office	Time in office	Party	Election	Assembly
1		Tan Sri Datuk Patinggi Abang Abdul Rahman Zohari Abang Openg (born 1950); MLA for Gedong	1 March 2022	Incumbent	4 years, 191 days	GPS (PBB)	–	19th

== Life after office ==
Chief ministers are usually granted certain privileges after leaving office at government expense. They are appointed to become the Yang di-Pertua Negeri (Governor). There were two former chief ministers who were appointed as Governor shortly after they left office: Abdul Rahman Ya'kub and Abdul Taib Mahmud.

While in the past, former chief ministers remained important state figures, there are currently no living former chief ministers. The most recently deceased was Abdul Taib Mahmud (1936–2024), who died on 21 February 2024.

== See also ==
- Constitution of the State of Sarawak
