= Yang di-Pertua Negeri of Sarawak =

Head of state of Sarawak, Malaysia

Governor of Sarawak
- Yang di-Pertua Negeri Sarawak
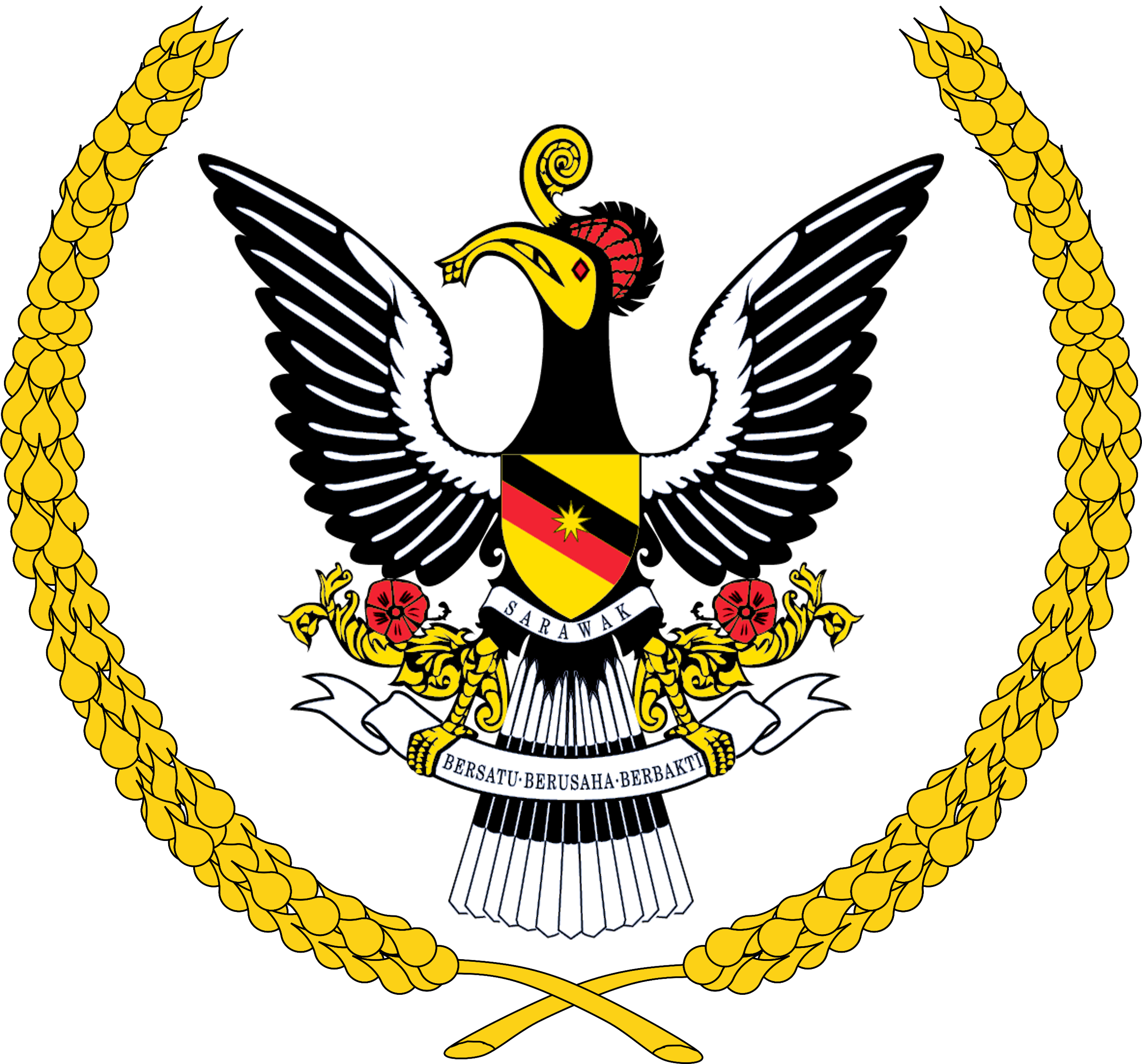
- Coat of arms of the Yang di-Pertua Negeri of Sarawak

- Standard of the Yang di-Pertua Negeri of Sarawak

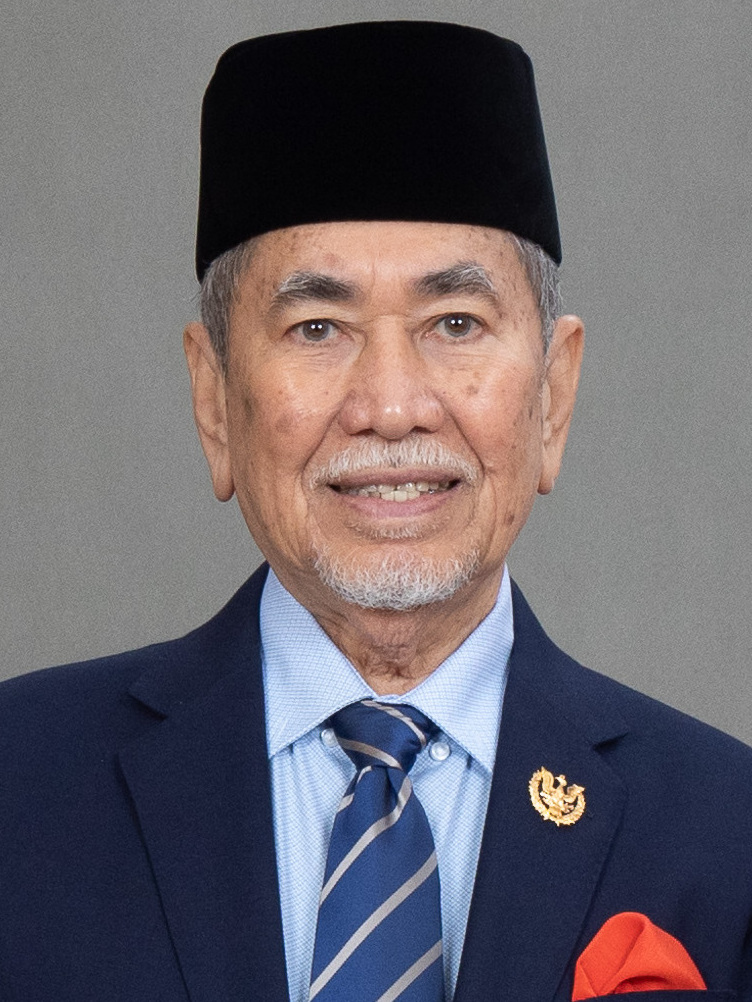
- Incumbent; Wan Junaidi Tuanku Jaafar since 26 January 2024
- Style: His Excellency (English); Tuan Yang Terutama (Malay)
- Status: Ceremonial head of state
- Member of: Conference of Rulers (as an observer)
- Residence: The Astana, Kuching, Sarawak
- Nominator: Premier of Sarawak
- Appointer: Yang di-Pertuan Agong; acting in his discretion after consultation with the Premier of Sarawak
- Term length: 4 years; Renewable
- Constituting instrument: Article 1(1) Constitution of Sarawak
- Precursor: Governor of the Crown Colony of Sarawak
- Inaugural holder: Abang Openg
- Formation: 16 September 1963
- Unofficial names: Governor of Sarawak
- Website: Astana Negeri Sarawak

The Governor of Sarawak, officially Yang di-Pertua Negeri of Sarawak (Malay: Yang di-Pertua Negeri Sarawak), is the ceremonial head of state of Sarawak, Malaysia. The Yang di-Pertua Negeri is styled Tuan Yang Terutama (lit. 'His Excellency'). The official residence of the governor is The Astana, located on the north bank of the Sarawak River in Kuching.

Wan Junaidi Tuanku Jaafar has been the Governor of Sarawak since 26 January 2024.

== History ==
Following the formation of Malaysia on 16 September 1963, the Constitution of Sarawak originally designated the head of state as Governor. Subsequently, on 27 August 1976, Act A354 amended the title to Yang di-Pertua Negeri, which remains in use to the present day.

== Appointment and role ==
The Constitution establishes the office of the Yang di-Pertua Negeri (Governor) of Sarawak. This position is appointed by the Yang di-Pertuan Agong (King), who must first consult with the Premier of Sarawak. However, the King retains the discretion to act as he deems appropriate in making the appointment.

The Governor holds office for a term of four years. Nevertheless, he may resign at any time by submitting a written resignation to the King. Furthermore, the King has the authority to remove the Governor from office. This can occur if a resolution calling for the removal is supported by not less than two-thirds of the members of the State Legislative Assembly.

In situations where the Governor is unable to perform his duties due to illness, absence or other causes, the King may appoint a qualified individual to act temporarily in that capacity after consultation with the Premier. A person acting in this temporary role is also permitted to represent Sarawak in the Conference of Rulers during the acting period.

Following a constitutional amendment made in 1997, the Governor may also appoint a representative to attend a specific meeting of the Conference of Rulers. This appointment must be made with the advice of the Premier and the consent of the King.

== Functions, powers and privileges ==
Many functions and powers of the king – at the federal level – are delegated to the governor at the state level – like the other rulers of states. The governor, however, has no power and function towards the judiciary. Most of them are appointed after consultation with the premier, except in appointing the premier. The same process occurred during dismissal of an office bearer.

The Constitution also describes powers of the governor in the Council Negri. All bills must be assented by the governor in 30 days after a bill passed. The governor also has to address the assembly annually.

== List ==
=== Governors of the Crown Colony of Sarawak (1946–1963) ===
No.	Coat of arms	Portrait	Governor	Took office	Left office	Duration	Monarch
1			Charles Arden-Clarke (1898–1962)	1 July 1946	26 July 1949	3 years, 26 days	George VI (1946–1952)
2			Duncan Stewart (1904–1949)	14 November 1949	10 December 1949	27 days	George VI (1946–1952)
—			Christopher Dawson (Acting Governor)	10 December 1949	4 April 1950	116 days	George VI (1946–1952)
3			Anthony Foster Abell (1906–1994)	4 April 1950	15 November 1959	9 years, 226 days	Elizabeth II (1952–1963)
4			Alexander Waddell (1913–1999)	23 February 1960	21 July 1963	3 years, 149 days	Elizabeth II (1952–1963)

=== Governors of Sarawak (1963–present) ===
No.	Coat of arms	Portrait	Governor	Took office	Left office	Duration	Yang di-Pertuan Agong (Reign)
1			Tun Datuk Abang Haji Openg bin Abang Sapiee (1905–1969)	16 September 1963	28 March 1969	5 years, 194 days	Tuanku Syed Putra (1960–1965)
1			Tun Datuk Abang Haji Openg bin Abang Sapiee (1905–1969)	16 September 1963	28 March 1969	5 years, 194 days	Sultan Ismail Nasiruddin Shah (1965–1970)
2			Tun Datuk Patinggi Tan Sri Tuanku Haji Bujang bin Tuanku Othman (1898–1986)	2 April 1969	1 April 1977	8 years, 0 days	Sultan Ismail Nasiruddin Shah (1965–1970)
2			Tun Datuk Patinggi Tan Sri Tuanku Haji Bujang bin Tuanku Othman (1898–1986)	2 April 1969	1 April 1977	8 years, 0 days	Tuanku Abdul Halim (1970–1975)
2			Tun Datuk Patinggi Tan Sri Tuanku Haji Bujang bin Tuanku Othman (1898–1986)	2 April 1969	1 April 1977	8 years, 0 days	Sultan Yahya Petra (1975–1979)
3			Tun Pehin Sri Abang Haji Muhammad Salahuddin bin Abang Barieng (1921–2022); First term	2 April 1977	1 April 1981	4 years, 0 days	Sultan Yahya Petra (1975–1979)
3			Tun Pehin Sri Abang Haji Muhammad Salahuddin bin Abang Barieng (1921–2022); First term	2 April 1977	1 April 1981	4 years, 0 days	Sultan Ahmad Shah (1979–1984)
4			Tun Datuk Patinggi Haji Abdul Rahman bin Ya'kub (1928–2015)	2 April 1981	1 April 1985	4 years, 0 days	Sultan Ahmad Shah (1979–1984)
4			Tun Datuk Patinggi Haji Abdul Rahman bin Ya'kub (1928–2015)	2 April 1981	1 April 1985	4 years, 0 days	Sultan Iskandar (1984–1989)
5			Tun Datuk Patinggi (Dr.) Haji Ahmad Zaidi Adruce bin Muhammed Noor (1924–2000)	2 April 1985	5 December 2000	15 years, 248 days	Sultan Iskandar (1984–1989)
5			Tun Datuk Patinggi (Dr.) Haji Ahmad Zaidi Adruce bin Muhammed Noor (1924–2000)	2 April 1985	5 December 2000	15 years, 248 days	Sultan Azlan Shah (1989–1994)
5			Tun Datuk Patinggi (Dr.) Haji Ahmad Zaidi Adruce bin Muhammed Noor (1924–2000)	2 April 1985	5 December 2000	15 years, 248 days	Tuanku Ja'afar (1994–1999)
5			Tun Datuk Patinggi (Dr.) Haji Ahmad Zaidi Adruce bin Muhammed Noor (1924–2000)	2 April 1985	5 December 2000	15 years, 248 days	Sultan Salahuddin (1999–2001)
6			Tun Pehin Sri Abang Haji Muhammad Salahuddin bin Abang Barieng (1921–2022); Second term	22 February 2001	28 February 2014	13 years, 7 days	Sultan Salahuddin (1999–2001)
6			Tun Pehin Sri Abang Haji Muhammad Salahuddin bin Abang Barieng (1921–2022); Second term	22 February 2001	28 February 2014	13 years, 7 days	Tuanku Syed Sirajuddin (2001–2006)
6			Tun Pehin Sri Abang Haji Muhammad Salahuddin bin Abang Barieng (1921–2022); Second term	22 February 2001	28 February 2014	13 years, 7 days	Sultan Mizan Zainal Abidin (2006–2011)
6			Tun Pehin Sri Abang Haji Muhammad Salahuddin bin Abang Barieng (1921–2022); Second term	22 February 2001	28 February 2014	13 years, 7 days	Tuanku Abdul Halim (2011–2016)
7			Tun Pehin Sri Haji Abdul Taib bin Mahmud (1936–2024)	1 March 2014	25 January 2024	9 years, 331 days	Tuanku Abdul Halim (2011–2016)
7			Tun Pehin Sri Haji Abdul Taib bin Mahmud (1936–2024)	1 March 2014	25 January 2024	9 years, 331 days	Sultan Muhammad V (2016–2019)
7			Tun Pehin Sri Haji Abdul Taib bin Mahmud (1936–2024)	1 March 2014	25 January 2024	9 years, 331 days	Al-Sultan Abdullah (2019–2024)
8			Tun Pehin Sri Dr. Haji Wan Junaidi bin Tuanku Jaafar (born 1946)	26 January 2024	Incumbent	2 years, 242 days	Al-Sultan Abdullah (2019–2024)
8			Tun Pehin Sri Dr. Haji Wan Junaidi bin Tuanku Jaafar (born 1946)	26 January 2024	Incumbent	2 years, 242 days	Sultan Ibrahim (2024–present)

== See also ==
- Yang di-Pertua Negeri

== Notes ==
1. Abang Muhammad Salahuddin was the first Yang di-Pertua Negeri to serve twice as the Governor of Sarawak.
