= Economy of Sarawak =

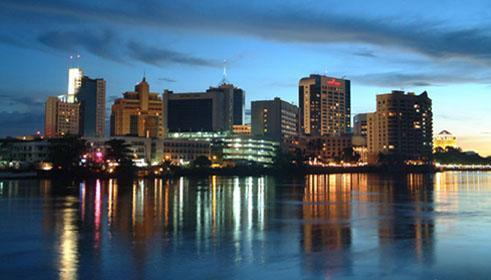
- Kuching, the financial centre of Sarawak
- Currency: Malaysian ringgit (MYR)
- Fiscal year: Calendar year

Statistics
- Population: 2.56 million (2020)
- GDP: ▲RM 140,200 million (nominal, 2022)
- GDP rank: 4th out of 15 states in Malaysia (including two federal territories)
- GDP growth: ▲6.5% (2022)
- GDP per capita: ▲RM 80,857 (2022)
- GDP per capita rank: 3rd out of 15 states in Malaysia (including two federal territories)
- GDP by sector: Services: 36.2%; Manufacturing: 26.3%; Mining and quarrying: 22.2%; Agriculture: 11.7%; Construction: 3.2%; (2020)
- Inflation (CPI): 1.9% (first quarter of 2022)
- Population below national poverty line: Absolute poverty: 9.0% (poverty line income of RM 2,131/month); Relative poverty: 15.2% (cutoff value RM 2,272/month); (2019)
- Gini coefficient: 0.387 (2019)
- Human Development Index: 0.737 (2021)
- Labour force: 1,440,800; Economic activity rate: 70.8%; (second quarter of 2022)
- Labour force by occupation: Agriculture, forestry, fishing (20.1%); Wholesale and retail trade (13.8%); Manufacturing (10.8%); Construction (9.2%); Hotel and food services (8.3%); (2020)
- Unemployment: 3.3% (second quarter of 2022)

External
- Exports: RM 100,591 million (2019)
- Export goods: Fossil fuels and lubricants (61.6%); Manufactured goods (13.7%); Animal, vegetable oils, fats (10.0%); Machinery and transport equipment (9.1%); Crude materials (2.2%); (2020)
- Main export partners: Japan (25.8%); Peninsular Malaysia (15.7%); People's Republic of China (11.3%); Republic of Korea (7.3%); Republic of China (Taiwan) (7.2%); (2018)
- Imports: RM 41,120 million (2020)
- Import goods: Machinery and transport equipment (32.9%); Chemicals (16.7%); Manufactured goods (14.0%); Food (12.5%); Crude materials (9.0%); (2020)
- Main import partners: Peninsular Malaysia (46.7%); Peoples' Republic of China (14.3%); Australia (5.2%); Japan (4.4%); Indonesia (3.8%); (2018)
- FDI stock: RM 28.2 billion (2022)

Public finance
- Revenue: RM 13.3 billion (2023)
- Spending: RM 11.5 billion (2023)
- Credit rating: Moody's Investors Service: A3 (stable) (2021); S&P Global Ratings: A− (stable) (2019)
- All values, unless otherwise stated, are in US dollars.

The economy of Sarawak is the fourth-largest of the states of Malaysia, making up 9.3% of the Malaysian gross domestic product (GDP) in 2022. Meanwhile, Sarawak is home to 7.9% of the Malaysian population (2.56 million out of 32.4 million people in Malaysia) based on the 2020 census.

Sarawak economy has traditionally heavily depended on natural resource extraction and exports, including oil and gas, timber and palm oil. These commodities still produce a significant proportion of Sarawak's gross domestic product. Main trade partners of Sarawak are: Peninsular Malaysia, China, and Japan.

== History ==
=== Brooke era ===
The first Rajah of Sarawak, James Brooke, who ruled from 1841 to 1868, did not engage in noticeable commercial or financial activities during his rule. Economic development began to progress slowly during the reign of his successor, Charles Brooke, from 1868 to 1917. Agriculture was the main focus of economic development, and international trade of local agricultural produce increased; for example the export of sago products to Singapore. Charles Brooke introduced a liberal land policy and encouraged the introduction of new cash crops. He also promoted the immigration of Chinese as peasant farmers. During the era of Charles Vyner Brooke (1917–1946), he continued his predecessor's policy of promoting land cultivation and food self-sufficiency. However, he opposed opening up the state for western capitalist economies and Chinese immigration.

During this period, the five main ethnic groups in Sarawak engaged in different economic activities based on their geographical location. The Malays lived near the rivers of Kuching, Samarahan, and Sri Aman, thus allowing them to trade. They brought goods such as salt, iron, and clothes to inland areas in exchange for rice and jungle products. The Iban people were engaged in shifting cultivation, while the Bidayuhs, who lived on hills, were engaged in hill paddy cultivation. The Melanaus stayed in Mukah where they produced sago for trade with Brunei Malay traders. The Chinese settlers were mainly from Guangdong and Fujian provinces. They became involved in various economic activities such as mining, trading, and cash crop plantations. For example, the Hakka people were involved in gold mining at Bau during the early days of Brooke rule. The Brooke government had encouraged the planting of cash crops such as rubber, pepper, gambier, sago, sugar cane, tea, coffee, tobacco, and rice. However, only rubber, sago, pepper and gambier planting were successful. These products were then exported to Singapore.

Food production relied entirely on subsistence agriculture by the Malays, Melanaus, and some Dayaks. They cultivated swamp paddy at lowland areas. Most of the Dayaks cultivated hill paddy at highland areas. Despite vast tracts of empty land available for cultivation, total paddy production was insufficient to meet the demand of the local population and rice have to be imported especially in the 1930s. One of such reasons was due to tendency of the local population to cultivate cash crops that can command a higher price than paddy such as coconut, sago, and rubber. In 1938, Brooke government invited C.L. Newman from Malayan Agriculture Service to survey the prospects of wet paddy plantations in Sarawak. Newman opined that second (today Sri Aman Division) and third division (today Sibu Division) are suitable for bunded paddy plantations with Banjar people's from Kalimantan. Instead of constructing major irrigation works, he suggested controlled drainage of existing paddy fields. Much of his work focused on constructing paddy demonstration and test plots in Kanowit, and the control the water drainage of paddy plots in Lundu, Simanggang, and Miri before the World War II. The Brooke government also made reservations for plots of land exclusively for paddy cultivation for example at Tanjong Beluku at Simunjan where 100 paddy lots were laid out. During the Brooke era, Japanese Nissa Shokai Estate started on an intensive, irrigated paddy cultivation at upper Samarahan in 1935. Rationing of rice, introduced in 1941, discouraged the Malays and Dayaks to use income from rubber to purchase rice, and had helped to persuade them to plant rice instead. Campaigns were introduced to encourage farmers to plant other food stuffs such as vegetables. However, all these measures had limited impact on food imports as European theatre of World War II broke out in 1939, thus making rubber prices attractive. This made 1940 Sarawak rice import to stand at an all-time high of 38,000 tonnes, valued at 3,650,000 dollars.

In the 1900s, Sarawak's total exports was only 6.1% of Malaya's; 38 years later, the total exports stood at 7.1% of Malaya's. The amount of trade was relatively small when compared to its vast territorial expense. The Sarawak government's revenue in 1900 and 1938 were 5.9% and 6.8% respectively of its Malaya counterparts in Federated Malay States. On the whole, the Sarawak economy was mostly stagnant during the Brooke era, especially compared to nearby British colonies such as the Federated Malay States, Straits Settlements, and Lower Myanmar. On the other hand, the lack of economic development led to an absence of social problems associated elsewhere with economic growth.

=== Japanese occupation ===
While the Japanese occupation of Sarawak from 1941 to 1945 brought many negative socio-economic consequences, Sarawak achieved food self-sufficiency through coercive measures. Those who did not cooperate, will be liable for work projects elsewhere. After conquered Sarawak, the Japanese immediately sought to export raw materials especially timber and oil to resupply their arm forces. The Japanese drilled 16 new oil wells at Miri and Seria (Seria is part of Brunei), but only managed to restore to half of the pre-war production by 1945. Total wartime production was 11 million barrels from both oil fields. Besides, coal were mined at Silantek, Second Division of Sarawak (today Sri Aman Division), but production figures was not known. Besides, Japanese started logging operations at the Rajang basin with the assistance of Chinese businessmen to make boats that load raw materials into larger Japanese ships. The Japanese took control of all sawmills in Sibu and Bintulu. In Bintulu alone, more than 4000 tons of sawn timber were milled. The Japanese also owned a sawmill in Lawas for construction of a fort at Muara and repair works at Seria oilfields. The Japanese relied on forced labour from Dayak, Chinese, and Javanese to build airfields in Sibu and Bintulu.

The Japanese issued their own currencies and put banks under exclusive control of the Japanese. Chinese businesses were merged into few centralised stores for ease of control. The Chinese communities in Sarawak were obliged to contribute a total of 1.9 million dollars to fund Japanese war efforts. The Japanese also opened up the Sarawak economy to Japanese companies such as Mitsui Norin and Mitsui Bussan, which controlled food production and trade, Mitsubishi (operating as Tawao Sangyo in Borneo) dominated sago industry, and Nissan Norin which controlled production of coconut oil. Mitsui Bussan acquired paddy indiscriminately from the paddy farmers around Kuching at a price set below its production costs, depriving the farmers of their own paddy needs. This had forced the farmers to depend their food supplies on sago for months before the next harvest. The system adopted by Mitsui Bussan had aggravated the food shortage problem. An extensive black market emerged in response to the food shortage. The Japanese maintained The Department of Agriculture in Kuching until March 1942 before it was absorbed into Department of Industries (Sangyo Ka). After September 1943, the department of agriculture was reduced into Bureau of Information and Mitsui Norin became solely responsible for agriculture development in Sarawak.

During the first six months of occupation, the Japanese started government run agricultural stations and government subsidised settlement schemes in order increase food crop production. Agricultural stations were started at Semengok, Tarat agricultural station at 34th mile, Simanggang Road, and at Sekama, all within the jurisdiction of Kuching Division. Tarat agricultural station also doubled as agricultural training centre, with medium of instruction as Japanese language. Japanese government chose a suitable area for settlement scheme, then divide them up into lots. Then, a leader was chosen to recruit other settlers and manage the settlement schemes. Those settlers would build their own homes using building materials from the Japanese government free of charge. However, tools, food rations, cash payments from the government were treated as loans and will be supplied for one year and be repaid in installments. Settlers would then plant specified crops such as rice, sweet potatoes, and maize on their allocated lots. The government will buy all the produce from the settlements at a fixed price set in advance. A total of 1000 hectares of land were used for food cultivation, mostly around the Simanggang road, during Japanese administration. Most notably, food cultivation scheme at Bijat, Simanggang kept Kuching District fed throughout the war. It continued to produce 36 tonnes of rice per month one year after the Second World War. However, Japanese food production schemes brought more negative outcomes than positive ones. There was no plans to store excess food or providing logistics to the market. The administration also broke its promise of buying food at a predetermined price and had unilaterally terminated food rations and cash payments before the one-year period. Settlers who lived inland, have a hard time of finding river transport to market the produce themselves, thus food items were left to rot at the roadside. Little is known about agricultural production activities in other divisions in Sarawak.

The Japanese neglected basic infrastructure developments in Sarawak such as roads, health and education facilities.

=== Federation of Malaysia ===
During its first few decades as part of Malaysia, the economy was dominated almost entirely by natural resources and commodities such as oil and gas, timber and palm oil. This resulted in rapid but volatile growth. Between 1967 and 1973, a boom in petroleum exports and price led to "mining and quarrying" going from less than 1% to almost a fifth of the economy. This expansion in value was not reflected in an expansion in employment, with the industry continuing to employ less than 1% of the population during this time.

From 1981 to 2000, Sarawak chief minister Abdul Taib Mahmud engaged in a policy called "Politics of Development", with a loose definition similar to Wawasan 2020. The policy was never fully defined by the chief minister or had any measurable targets to be achieved. Analysts believed that such policy later evolved into a practice of dishing out short-term infrastructure projects to win electoral support during elections. However, some development did occur in agriculture and manufacturing sectors such as fisheries, farming, logging, oil and gas, setting up industrial parks, and promote high tech industries at Sama Jaya Free Industrial Zone during this time. Some shifts towards industry and services began during this time in line with increasing urbanisation. In 1990, just over half of economic value was generated by the primary sector. In 2008, Sarawak Corridor of Renewable Energy (SCORE) was started. It is an economic plan focusing on heavy industries and knowledge-based economy. By 2010, services made up 32% of the economy, and manufacturing 25%. As of 2011, primary commodities made up 50% of the state's total exports. In 2011, export of crude palm oil in Sarawak exceeded 2 million tonnes with main export partners being China and India. The expansion in plantations often occurred through new logging of old-growth forests. In 2016, Sarawak government started "Sarawak Socio-Economic Transformation Plan", aiming to achieve better economic growth and improve the quality of life for the rural populace. In 2017, Sarawak government introduced 2018-2022 digital economy strategy, hoping to digitise all sectors of economy. As a result of this initiative, Sarawak Multimedia Authority and Sarawak Digital Economy Corporation were set up to promote this effort.

Cross border trade between Sarawak and West Kalimantan (Indonesia) accounts for less than 2% of all trades in Sarawak, or 0.7% of total Malaysian trade with Indonesia. Sarawak experienced trade deficit with West Kalimantan from 1998 to 2006 although Sarawak GDP per capita was six times higher than West Kalimantan. Sarawak exports chemical products (SITC 5), machineries, and transport equipment (SITC 7) while importing food items (SITC 0) and manufactured goods (SITC 6 and 8) from West Kalimantan. Trade between Sarawak and West Kalimantan halted between 2014 and 2017. It was only on 22 November 2017, cross border trade with Indonesia resumed. Administrative divisions of Sarawak near the Kalimantan border such as the Kapit Division are less economically developed. Development of Sarawak-West Kalimantan border trade is expected to benefit organic foods, followed by palm oil, fisheries, and tourism industries. The economic internal rate of return (IRR) can reach 19.6% and economic net present value (NPV) of US$397 million at 9% if there is no cost overruns or reduction of benefits. IRR reduces to 11.8% and NPV reduces to US$124 million if there are 10% cost overruns and 10% benefits reduction.

In 2019, both S&P Global Ratings and Moody's Investors Service gave "stable outlook" credit ratings for the economy of Sarawak. During 2020 COVID-19 pandemic in Sarawak, Moody's downgraded the rating to "negative" before reinstating "stable" rating in 2021 due to improved global oil prices.

In July 2021, Sarawak government introduced "Post Covid-19 development strategy" through better economic structure, facilitate foreign and domestic investments, and expand physical and digital infrastructures. This strategy aims to achieve GDP growth of 8% per annum, thus reaching total GDP size of RM 282 billion in 2030, create 195,000 new job opportunities, and raise household income to RM 15,047. Making Sarawak as net food exporter is another target on reaching the year 2030. In November 2022, a bill was passed in Sarawak State Legislative Assembly to set up its own sovereign wealth fund with an initial cash injection of RM 8 billion, followed by RM 300 million to RM 600 million annually in the following years. In August 2023, nine individuals were chosen to lead the wealth fund. As of 2021, Sarawak, together with Negeri Sembilan, and Pahang have better Sustainable Development Goals (SDG) scores when compared to Selangor, Pulau Pinang, and Johor. Meanwhile, Kuala Lumpur, Putrajaya, and Labuan have the best SDG scores in Malaysia.

== Macroeconomic trends ==
From 1962 to 1974, the average growth of GDP was 8.7 percent per annum while average per capita GDP growth from 1963 to 1997 stood at 7.8 percent per annum. From 1970 to 1975, Sarawak saw an average of 20% growth rate of yearly GDP due to a steep increase of oil prices during that time. In 1970, the Sarawak GDP per capita ranked 8th out of 13 states in Malaysia, but in 1980, the Sarawak GDP per capita deteriorated to 10th. In 1990, the Sarawak GDP per capita improved to 6th. From 1991 to 1995, the Sarawak average GDP growth rate was at eight percent per annum. Poverty also reduced from 56.5% in 1976 to 17% in 1995. In 2004, poverty rate fell to 8% and largely confined to rural areas. From 1980 to 1995, Sarawak attracted RM 7 billion in foreign direct investment (FDI), which was 7.5% of the total FDI approved in Malaysia. This pushed Sarawak to the 5th spot amongst other states in Malaysia in terms of FDI attractiveness. In the last forty years until 2013, Sarawak had shown remarkable catchup with Selangor (the richest state in Malaysia) in terms of nominal GDP and GDP per capita. Sarawak would require an annual economic growth rate of 6% to catch up with Selangor in 6 years or catch up in 3 years with annual growth rate of 7%.

The GDP growth of Sarawak is strongly correlated to the total amount of exports. During the period of high GDP growth from 2002 to 2006, the export activities of Sarawak also increased rapidly, where the value of exports rose from RM 27.4 billion in 2002 to RM 61.9 billion in 2006. On the other hand, imports increased only moderately during the same period, from RM 15.3 billion to RM 22.4 billion in 2006. Therefore, net exports recorded a value of RM 12.9 billion in 2002, growing to RM 40 billion in 2006. In May 2023, Premier of Sarawak Abang Johari announced that Sarawak GDP per capita reached RM 65,971 in 2021. In July 2023, World Bank announced that the gross national income (GNI) per capita in Sarawak exceeded US$13,205 (RM 61,500) for the first time, making it a high-income state in Malaysia, after Kuala Lumpur and Labuan. Meanwhile, Penang and Selangor GNI per capita ranked after Sarawak in 4th and 5th place respectively. However, the 2022 mean household income in Sarawak is RM 6,457, located at the 10th place.

Sarawak's labour force participation rate (65.6%) was higher than the national average (63.1%) in 2007. However, this was attributable to labour force participation with a low educational level.

The following table shows macroeconomic indicators from 1970 to 2021:

Year	GDP (in RM million)	GDP per capita (in RM)	GDP growth (nominal/real)	Unemployment rate (in percent)	Account surplus/deficit (in ±% of GDP)	Share of national GDP (in percent)
1970	820	881				
1971	▲959	▲962	14.1		-6.5	
1972	▲1,055	▲1,032	▼7.3		▼-10.0	
1973	▲1,370	▲1,307	▲26.6		▲-7.0	
1974	▲1,884	▲1,753	▲34.1		▼-7.5	
1975	▲2,034	▲1,844	▼5.2		▼-8.0	
1976					▲-1.5	
1977					▼-2.0	
1978					▼-4.5	
1979					▲-3.0	
1980	▲5,317	▲2,292			▲1.0	
1981		▲2,972			▼-2.0	
1982				2.8	▲-1.5	
1983				▲5.2	▼-0.5	
1984	▲8,897			▲6.7	▼-2.0	
1985			▲5.3	▲7.1	▲-1.5	
1986				▲9.0	▼-2.5	
1987	▲10,388			▲9.8	▲-0.5	
1988	▼10,271		▼-1.2	▲10.3	▼-3.5	
1989	▲11,377		▲10.8	▼9.6	▼-4.0	
1990	▲12,314	▲3,883		▲9.9	▼-4.5	
1991	▲13,951		▲13.3		▼-6.0	
1992				▼7.8	▼-14.0	
1993	▼13,203			▼7.0	▲-10.0	
1994					▼-12.0	
1995		▲9,287		▼4.8	▲-10.0	
1996				▼4.4	▲-9.5	
1997	▲22,097			▼3.9	▲-9.0	
1998			▼1.93	▲5.0	▼-11.0	
1999	▲25,475			▼4.6	▲-6.5	
2000	▲30,700	▲12,755		▼4.3	▼-8.5	8.9
2001	▼28,000			▲4.4	▲-8.0	
2002	▲30,800			▼4.0	▲-6.0	
2003	▲35,000		▲13.6	▼3.9	▲-5.0	
2004	▲40,000		▲19.8	▼3.8	▲-3.0	
2005	▲43,878	▲24,224		▲4.1	▲4.1	▲10.4
2006	▲45,560	▲26,912	▼4.0	4.1	▲4.7	▼9.6
2007	▲48,540	▲29,562	▲8.0	▲4.3	▼4.5	▲9.7
2008	▲49,484	▲34,855	▼0.3	▲5.3	▼2.3	▼9.3
2009	▼48,848	▼30,318	▼-2.0	▼4.6	▼1.2	▲9.4
2010	▲87,131	▲35,034	▲4.3	▼4.4	▲2.6	▲10.6
2011	▲92,700	▲40,632	▲6.4	▼4.1	2.6	▲10.7
2012	▲94,013	▲41,493	▼1.4	▼3.5	▼2.5	▼10.3
2013	▲98,089	▲41,766	▲4.3	3.5	▼2.0	10.3
2014	▲102,359	▲44,596	▲4.4	▼2.3		▼10.1
2015	▲106,307	▼44,012	▼3.9	▲3.1		▼10.0
2016	▲108,778	▲44,379	▼2.3	▲3.3		▼9.8
2017	▲130,169	▲50,177	▲4.5	▼3.0		▼9.7
2018	▲133,010	▲52,387	▼2.2	▲3.2		9.7
2019	▲136,758	▲53,552	▲2.8	▼3.1		▼9.6
2020	▼127,116	▼48,657	▼ -7.1	▲4.3		▼9.5
2021	▲131,200	▲65,971	▲2.9	▼4.0		9.5
2022	▲140,200	▲80,857	▲6.5			▼9.3

== Infrastructure ==
The Pan-Borneo Highway is the major federal trunk road network that connects Sarawak to Sabah and Brunei with a total length of 1,060 kilometres (660 mi). Of its total length, only 144 kilometres (89 mi) was four-lane dual carriageway (JKR R5 standard) while the remaining was two-lane single carriageway (JKR R3 standard). This made the trunk road congested, with 19 hours required to travel from the southern zone to the northern zone. In addition, road conditions were poor, with potholes, uneven surfaces, too many bends, a lack of safety rail guards, and a lack of street lighting. This is partly due to high amount of soft peat soils in coastal regions (where the roads are constructed), inadequate planning, and a lack of funding. Therefore, a project was started in 2015 to upgrade all sections of the trunk road into toll-free four-lane dual carriageway. The Sarawak section of the Pan-Borneo Highway was 99.98 percent completed by December 2025. In July 2026, the 4.8 km Batang Lupar bridge connecting the Sarawak coastal road network was opened.

Rural road access brought variable benefits to rural communities, depending on the size of the urban centre that the community that has access to and the distance of the remote communities to road access. Road and hydroelectric dam projects are expected to have significant impacts both on biodiversity and on local communities near the construction sites. In December 2025, the Sarawak government gazetted 5,977 km of logging road under the state road maintenance programme.

In 2022, the 700 km Batam Sarawak Internet Cable System (BaSICS) connecting Kuching through Batam, Indonesia to Singapore was launched. A tier IV data centre at Santubong (near Kuching) was also officiated. In October 2026, SoftBank Group, Grab Holdings, and Petroleum Sarawak entered into a framework agreement to build an AI and digital infrastructure platform in Sarawak.

== Economic policy ==
Companies intending to supply works and services to the state government of Sarawak such as electrical and mechanical works should not have foreign equity higher than 49% of the company shares. Besides, at least 30% of the shares should be held by bumiputera. Construction projects valued less than or equal to RM 200,000 would be reserved for bumiputera companies (where 51% or more of the shares are held by bumiputera and financial management is controlled by bumiputera). Bigger projects would be awarded through bidding process. Meanwhile, the manufacturing sector has been fully liberalised where foreign entities can hold 100% of the company shares. Malaysian federal government provided tax incentives (exemption from import and excise duties) for various sectors such as manufacturing, agricultural sector, biotechnology, shipping and transportation, training, and research and development. Incentives provided by the Sarawak state government are: additional round of tax benefits for being pioneer status, 100% infrastructure allowance, and full import duty exemption for any raw materials, or parts not available in Sarawak. Other benefits include reduction of freight charges for shipping of goods from Sarawak and Sabah to Peninsular Malaysia.

Cabotage policy was implemented in Malaysia on 1 January 1980. This policy designated Port Klang as the main container hub in Malaysia, where all the international cargo ships must make a stop. The distributions of goods from Port Klang to other ports in the country are handled by domestic shipping companies. In 2017, liberation was introduced to exempt East Malaysia from this policy so as to enable foreign ships to transport cargo from ports in Peninsular Malaysia to Sarawak and Sabah so as to lower the price of import items in these two states. However, the Sarawak government wanted the cabotage policy to be reinstated so as to protect the local shipbuilding and shipping industry. In 2024, foreign ships are allowed to provide direct shipping to ports in Sarawak, Sabah and Labuan without going through Port Klang.

The rate of commercialisation of new inventions that were selected in exhibitions/competitions/conferences has been low. Therefore, Sarawak government established seven innovation hubs and five private sector partner hubs to provide support and market access to entrepreneurs and startups. As of 2026, Sarawak had 129 startups, ranked 5th amongst the states in Malaysia. Kuching first appeared in the "StartupBlink 2025 Global Startup Ecosystem Report" in 2025 with a total of 8 startups.

== Sectors ==
Petroleum and natural gas, forestry, and logging have made limited contributions to local socio-economic development. This is because natural resource extraction is a capital-intensive industry that requires few skilled workers. These industries are also highly dependent on inputs from elsewhere, thus generating little benefits to the local economy. Despite being a world-class supplier in resource-based products, Sarawak has no clear international competitive advantage due to a low standard of architecture of supply such as the structure of the natural resource market and relationships among firms that supply such resources.

Japanese companies bought a significant amount of raw timber from Sarawak. Japan traditionally maintained discriminatory policies against processed wood products from developed countries. As the federal government took control of the offshore oil and gas resources of Sarawak, political elites in Sarawak turned to controlling timber concessionaires to maintain their influence, thus leading to large-scale timber extraction in the state in the 1980s and 1990s. Sarawak continued the traditional style of modernisation through large-scale agriculture, industrialisation, and urbanisation; with little room for the conservation of forests unless such conversation efforts are worthwhile in tourism development.

As of 2010, energy generation in Sarawak was dominated by fossil fuels, where natural gas dominating at 60% supply, coal occupying 25%, hydroelectric energy at 9% and oil at 6%.

Agriculture, forestry, and fishing contributed to 30% of total employment in Sarawak from 2002 to 2006. In the same period, the manufacturing sector employed 12% of the total Sarawak labour force. Other secondary sectors such as electricity, gas, water supply, and construction employed approximately 10% of the total workforce. The tertiary sector in Sarawak employed more than 55% of the workforce. Within the sector, wholesale and retail industries employed 14% of the workforce, hotels and restaurants employed 5% of the workers, and transport and communication industries employed 4% of the workforce.

=== Oil and gas ===
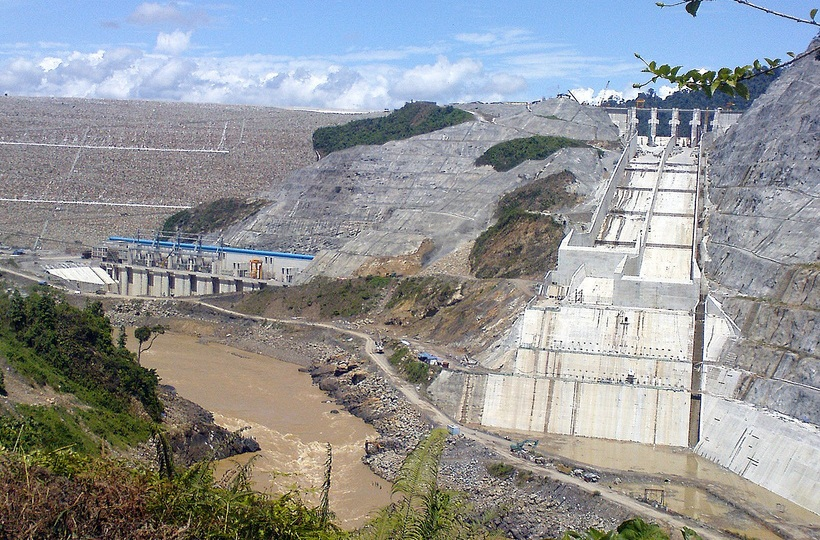
Bakun Dam under construction in 2009. The dam is the main source for electric energy in Sarawak.

Sarawak has a vast amount of oil and gas reserves in seven geological provinces: West Baram Delta, Balingian, Central Luconia, Tinjar, Tatau, West Luconia, and North Luconia. Out of these geological provinces, oil was extracted only in West Baram Delta, Balingian, and Central Luconia. In 2017, Sarawak produced 26% of all total Malaysian oil production, compared with 42% from Sabah and 32% from Peninsular Malaysia. Meanwhile, Sarawak produced 61% of Malaysian natural gas, while Peninsular Malaysia's share stood at 26% and Sabah at 13%. In 2023, a survey by Petronas revealed that Sarawak accounts for 61%, Sabah accounts for 18.8% and Peninsular Malaysia accounts for 20% of 6.9 billion barrels of probable and proven oil reserves in Malaysia.

In 1911, Royal Dutch Shell opened the first onshore cable tool drilling well in Miri. It paid to the Brooke government the equivalent of RM 0.05 to 0.14 of 1978 Malaysian ringgit of royalty per tonne of oil produced from 1911 to 1940. From 1946 to 1956, Royal Dutch Shell paid to Crown Colony of Sarawak equivalent to RM 0.40 to 0.80 of 1978 Malaysian ringgit per tonne in royalty fees. In 1958, the Sarawak Oil Mining Ordinance was proposed. Oil companies were subjected to oil royalty rates according to distance from the shores i.e. the further the oil well is from the shore, the lower the payment of oil royalty to the government. Royalties for natural gas was also defined. The oil companies were also subjected to a 40% general corporate income tax after other expenses and oil royalties were deducted from the oil revenue. However, no oil royalty payment was recorded after 1956. Miri onshore oil field reserves was diminishing since 1968 and later shut down in 1973.

Since its incorporation in 1974, Malaysian national oil and gas company Petronas is given full control of oil and gas reserves in Malaysia. Production sharing agreements (PSC) were signed between Petronas and various foreign oil companies. In the 1960s, large reserves of natural gas was discovered in Central Luconia basin, 125 km offshore Bintulu. In March 1978, Petronas entered a joint venture with Shell, Mitsubishi Corporation, and the government of Sarawak to develop liquified natural gas (LNG) projects. In June 1978, Malaysia LNG was incorporated as a result of the joint venture. Since then, Malaysia become one of the major LNG producers in the world.

Petronas PSC profit-sharing terms have become more flexible throughout the years to attract the investments of foreign oil companies. Despite the rising cost of oil exploration, the oil royalty payout remains the same where 5% goes to the federal government and 5% to oil-rich state governments. Sarawak receives about RM 600 million in oil royalty per year.

Acknowledging that the Sarawak oil and gas industry is dependent on the Peninsular Malaysia, which caused loss of revenue, Sarawak chief minister Abang Abdul Rahman Johari Abang Openg announced the establishment of state-owned oil and gas company Petroleum Sarawak Berhad (PETROS) in 2017. Since 2019, Sarawak imposed 5% sales tax on petroleum products. As of September 2021, Sarawak collected a total of RM 6.8 billion in sales tax. In 2024, PETROS took over the trading of natural gas in Sarawak from Petronas.

=== Coal ===
In 2008, Malaysian Department of Minerals and Geology estimated that of 1,724 billion tonnes of coal reserves in Malaysia, Sarawak occupies 80% of the reserves while Sabah take up 19%. Sarawak coal mining industry is under-developed, producing 1 million tonnes of coal annually to supply six coal-fired power plants in Sarawak.

=== Renewable energy ===
High rainfall and availability of dam construction sites has enabled several hydroelectric dams to be built, such as Batang Ai Dam, Bakun Dam, and Murum Dam. In February 2008, Sarawak Corridor of Renewable Energy (SCORE) was launched, utilising electricity generated from hydroelectric dams and coal-fire power plants in Sarawak to develop ten priority industries in Sarawak, namely oil and gas, aluminium, steel, and glass manufacturing industries, timber and palm oil industries, livestock, aquaculture, and tourism industries. As of 2018, a total of 22 projects invested RM 79.3 billion into the corridor, where ten of them were in operation. Majority of the investments went to Samalaju industrial park in Bintulu.

In 2017, the state government authorised Sarawak Energy to conduct researches on commercial applications of hydrogen fuel technology. In 2019, the first integrated hydrogen production and refueling plant in Southeast Asia was launched in Kuching with collaboration with Linde plc. Besides, several hydrogen buses were also launched. As of 2022, Sarawak Economic Development Corporation (SEDC), a statutory body of the government of Sarawak, had partnered with various companies on hydrogen technology development, such as Petronas, Japanese Eneos Corporation, Australian H2X Global, French group Thales New Energy, and South Korean Samsung Engineering, POSCO and Lotte Chemical. Hydrogen powered Autonomous Rail Rapid Transit (ART) was introduced in Kuching in August 2023.

Sarawak Energy and Sarawak Biodiversity Centre started to collaborate with the Japanese CHITOSE Group on a microalgae research project in 2020. The microalgae production facility was launched in April 2023 at Sejingkat, Petra Jaya. Potential applications of microalgae are: sustainable aviation fuels, animal feeds and pharmaceutical products.

=== Mineral resources ===
Sarawak is rich in mineral resources such as copper, silica sand, and kaolin. Although Sematan District is rich with bauxite and antimony, Sarawak government refused to issue prospecting licenses because of its potential to cause environmental pollution affecting tourism potential in the district. There are also some small-scale gold and diamond mining in Sarawak.

As of 2012, the geology of Sarawak and Sabah have not been mapped in detail on whether there is any significant rare earth deposits in these two states. According to a study by Malaysian National Mineral and Geoscience Department in 2017, four districts in Sarawak namely Lundu, Bau, Serian, and Simunjan have non-radioactive rare earth elements (NR-REE) exceeding 300 parts per million (ppm). These areas have the potential for follow-up studies for assessment of their rare earth reserves.

=== Agriculture ===
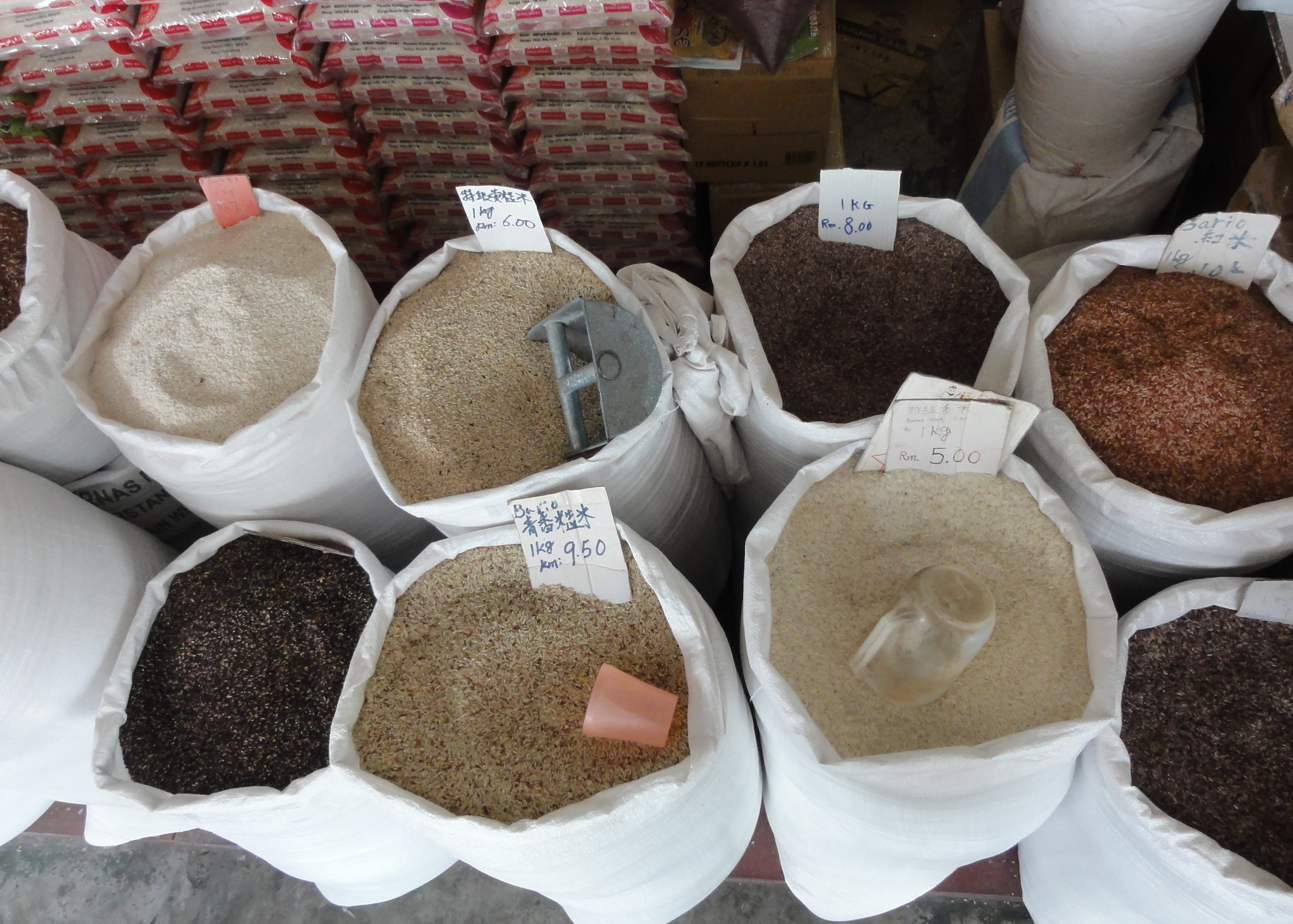
Different variety of rice at a grocery store in Sibu.

Major commodities produced in Sarawak are palm oil, rubber and cocoa. Major food items produced includes livestock, fisheries, rice. Other food commodities include coconut, vegetables, fruits, tobacco and pepper. Agriculture in Sarawak is dominated with smallholders (land ownership less than two acres). This makes it difficult for smallholder farmers to invest in modern farming technologies. As of 1989, shifting cultivation of food crops is still prevalent in Sarawak longhouses as it is part of the culture that ensures food security of the household. Shifting cultivation is still practiced probably due to low opportunity cost; as a result of few alternative jobs that can command higher returns. Besides, the majority of the food farmers are elderly. The productivity of rural farms is still heavily dependent upon the changing weather patterns such as timing of slash-and-burn to the onset of rain.

In the 1970s, the Malaysian federal government implemented various paddy irrigation schemes to the whole of Sarawak, but production data from these schemes were lacking. In 1974, 40% of rice consumption in Sarawak was imported. Paddy productivity was 1.1 kg per man-hour in 1977. Average yield of paddy vary from 500 kg to 1.8 tonne per hectare from the 1970s to 1990s. In 2011, 70% of rice consumed in Sarawak was imported. The paddy yield increased marginally to 1.9 tonnes per hectare in 2013. In 2012, Padiberas Nasional Berhad (BERNAS, a Malaysian trade enterprise for rice importation) set up a 15 hectares model farm at Lupar River with paddy variety of MR219, and planned to expand the farm to 5,100 hectares by 2020. As of 2025, a total of 1,306 hectares of land has been developed, costing RM 148.7 million. However, landowners converted the developed areas into more profitable oil palm cultivation, and the project is limited by the land tenure of Native Customary Rights (NCR) lands. Between 2010 and 2016, Sarawak's rice self-sufficiency ranged from 44% to 51%, with imports averaging at 150,000 tonnes per year. Sarawak government aimed 60% paddy self-sufficiency level by 2030. Although with low productivity, Sarawak produces 300 varieties of traditional rice, which command higher prices than ordinary rice. The red rice variety has been used by Nestlé to produce baby food.

Self sufficiency of livestock in Sarawak varies. In 2019, self-sufficiency level for pork was 112%, 100% for chicken eggs, 94% for poultry, 45% for milk, 12% for beef, and 5% for mutton. Sarawak Economic Development Corporation (SEDC), through its subsidiary companies, breed prawns, beef, goat, deer, and provides cattle feedlots or fattening and abattoir services throughout Sarawak.

Sarawak Oil Palm Board (SOPB) was established in 1968 by Commonwealth Development Corporation (now British International Investment) to enable the commercialisation of oil palms in Sarawak. Oil palm productivity increased from 6.23 metric tonnes per hectare in 1975 to 10.46 tonnes per hectare in 1981. Large scale oil palm plantations began in the 1990s and continued in the 2000s. In 2010, Sarawak accounted for 20% of palm oil production in Malaysia, after Peninsular Malaysia (52%), and Sabah (29%). Yield of fresh fruit branch from oil palm ranged from 10 to 20 tonnes/hectare/year., lower when compared to Peninsular Malaysia and Sabah with yield of 20 tonnes/hectare/year. Factors that affect farm productivity are farm size, farm management knowledge, and farm operation skills. Sarawak Land Consolidation and Rehabilitation Authority (Salcra) was also set up in 1976 enable native land owners to reap benefits from oil palm plantation schemes.

Sarawak rubber production has been in continual decline. In 2000, Sarawak produced 345,000 tonnes of rubber. In 2011, the production rose briefly to 433,000 tonnes due to higher rubber prices. In 2020, the production reduced to 57,000 tonnes. Most rubber smallholders treated their plantations as cash reserves where the rubber trees are only tapped when rubber prices increased. In 2022, Sarawak Rubber Industry Board (Sarib) was set up to regulate and revitalise the rubber industry in Sarawak.

Cocoa farming in Sarawak are largely dominated by smallholders. In the 1980s, Sarawak accounted for 16.9% of total cocoa cultivated area in Malaysia. Meanwhile, Sabah occupies 50% and Peninsular Malaysia occupies 33.5% of total cocoa farming areas. As of 2019, Sarawak produced 151 tonnes of cocoa beans from 6,800 hectares of cocoa farms.

As of 2020, 98% of pepper farmers in Malaysia are located in Sarawak. Majority of pepper produced in Sarawak are from Sarikei, Betong, and Serian divisions. Pepper exports increased from 15,028 tonnes in 1970 to 20,006 tonnes in 1981. Pepper production reached 28,000 tonnes in 1997 where 85% of it were exported. Malaysian Pepper Board, headquartered in Sarawak, was set up to coordinate pepper processing and grading, quality improvement, acquire market information for pepper and licensing of pepper dealers and exporters. The pepper farms in Sarawak are generally technically inefficient because of improper farm management, harvesting practices, capital allocation, and crop diversity.

=== Forestry ===
During the Brooke era, majority of the trade were forest products with Singapore such as camphor (from Dryobalanops aromatica spp), gutta percha (Palaquium spp), aloe woods, Catechu, and Jelutong (Dyera costulata). Other jungle products with medicinal uses such as bezoar stones, bird nests, beeswax, hornbill ivory were also being traded. Until the first World War, trade in forest products was more important than timber. After World War II, market for low density timber products such as veneer, plywood, and wood products for general construction started to emerge. By the 1960s, heavy machineries and invention of one man chainsaw enables large scale harvesting of timber. In 1973, Sarawak Timber Industry Development Corporation was set up to formulate policies, plans, and development of local timber industry to market high quality timber products locally and abroad.

Degradation of Sarawak's forests occurred at a rate of 0.65% per year, largely attributed to expansion of oil palm plantation at a rate of 10.3% per year. As of 1995, Sarawak was 69.8% forested, including dipterocarp forests, swamp forests, mangrove forests, and plantation forests. Some areas were converted into forest plantations, which accounts for 3.25% of total forested area as in 2013. Meanwhile, protected forested area accounts for 6.64% of total forested area in 2013, which is considered small. Sarawak has the largest area of planted forests in Malaysia as of 2018, occupying 403,017 hectares, consists of Acacia mangium. This is followed by Sabah (300,521 hectares), and Peninsular Malaysia (113,112 hectares). Although Sarawak government pledged to support sustainable forest management (SFM) practices, the progress has been slow for both natural forests or planted forests. SFM certification in Sarawak is done on voluntary basis. Before 2010, only two forest management units (FMU) applied for SFM certifications, namely Selaan-Linau FMU and Anap-Muput FMU. In 2013, Anap-Muput FMU was successfully certified under Malaysian Timber Certification Scheme where the latter adopted its SFM scheme from Programme for the Endorsement of Forest Certification (PEFC).

Log production from Sarawak was increasing from 1965 to a peak of 20 million cubic metres in 1991. Sarawak was the world's largest exporter of tropical timber in the 1980s. In 1990, International Tropical Timber Organization (ITTO) made a visit to Sarawak and recommended that log production to be reduced to 9.0 million cubic metres for sustainable forest management. In 1992, the log export quota was imposed to promote local wood-processing industries such as logs, plywood, sawn timber, wood residue products, molding, pulp, and paper. About 60% of the harvested logs were channeled to the downstream processing industries. After 1992, there was a continual decline in log production. In 2003, timber output stood at 14.3 million cubic metres. In 2013, timber output reduced to 8.2 million cubic metres. In 2005, sawmilling and timber processing accounted for 193,011 jobs in Sarawak. In 2011, Sarawak government collected RM 4.6 billion in forest related revenues, where direct revenues from the collection of premia, royalties, and tariffs amounted to RM 412 million, 9.0% of total forest revenues. Instead of emulating Peninsular Malaysia that imposed bans of log exports in stages since 1985, Sarawak adopted the approach of gradually reducing the log export quota. In 2018, export quota was reduced to 20% of total timber produced.

In November 2021, plant cloning laboratory was opened to cultivate Paulownia tree species as a source of lightweight timber.

=== Manufacturing ===
Sarawak has a total of 21 industrial estates. Sama Jaya Free Industrial Zone is the only high-tech industrial estate while Similajau Industrial Estate is the only heavy and energy-intensive industrial estate. Kuala Baram, Rantau Panjang, and Tanjung Manis cater to shipbuilding and repairing. Other industrial estates cater light to medium industries. As of 1995, wood and wood products industries accounted for 37.8% of the manufacturing industry in Sarawak, followed by food, beverages, and tobacco at 18.1%, and fabricated metal products, machinery and equipment at 17.4%.

Dayak indigenous motif designs have been widely applied in handicrafts and cottage industries, but limited applications in locally manufactured furniture. Sarawak furniture exports accounted for 0.42% (RM27.82 million) of total Malaysian furniture earnings of RM 6.7 billion in 2008. Majority of furniture manufacturing activities are concentrated in west Malaysian states of Johor, Selangor and Perak. In 2015, of 2,965 furniture plants in Malaysia, 2,630 are located in Peninsular Malaysia, 215 plants in Sarawak, and 120 plants in Sabah. Majority of high quality timber from Sarawak are exported due to higher prices it fetched in foreign markets. Therefore, local furniture manufacturers can only source low quality timber or import furniture component parts. Besides, high transportation and utility costs, shortage of skilled manpower, difficulty in securing financing, and lack of other supporting industries resulting in under-developed local furniture manufacturing industry. In 2017, Sarawak Young Designers' programme was launched to train designers from Bandung Institute of Technology for furniture companies in Sarawak.

Sarawak has 60 of 100 shipyards nationwide. 40 of them are operating inside Sibu. The shipyards in Sarawak focused on producing and repairing small to medium-sized vessels such as tugboats, offshore support vessels (OSVs), barges, anchor handlers and passenger boats. However, local shipyards often rely on foreign labour and designs for large and sophisticated ships and do not employ the latest technologies in shipbuilding. Several shipowners are to build yards in other countries where costs are cheaper and better incentives are offered.

In 1973, the Sarawak state government set up Sarawak Motor Industries in Kuching to assemble Toyota and BMW models. The plant closed down in 1986. In 1986, DNC Asiatic Holdings Sdn Bhd started to assemble motorcycles in Kuching. In 2018, the debt-ridden company went into receivership. In 2012, N B Heavy Industries Sdn Bhd opened the state's only truck assembly plant in Sibu. It employed 150 workers, and assembles about 6,000 JAC and BeiBen trucks annually.

=== Services ===
Attempts to diversify from resource extraction include promotion of the tourism industry. Most international tourism flies into Kuching in the south, so the sector in the north of the state is more dependent on tourists from the rest of Malaysia and neighbouring Brunei. Tourists arrivals increased steadily from 1990 to 2004 and had contributed significantly to the economic growth of Sarawak. Meanwhile, rising exchange rate has negative impact on economic growth. Meanwhile, government spending in tourism sector is affecting economic growth in the long term rather than short-term economic growth. Average productivity of the services sector in Sarawak is lower than other sectors such as agriculture, mining, manufacturing, and construction possibly due to low skilled workforce, and poor internet connectivity in rural areas.

In 2006, Sarawak Convention Bureau (SCB) was established to attract business events to be hosted in Sarawak. SCB was later rebranded to Business Events Sarawak (BE Sarawak). In 2021, a total of 105 business events was hosted in Sarawak. In 2022, BE Sarawak established "International Journal of Business Events and Legacies" together with Curtin University.

In 2017, the Development Bank of Sarawak (DBoS) was set up with a capital of RM 500 million from the state government to fund strategic infrastructure projects in the state such as a methanol plant in Bintulu, fixing of 1,020 dilapidated schools, and the Kuching Light Rail Transit (LRT) system.

In 2017, the Sarawak government launched "Sarawak Pay", an e-wallet that enable cashless payments of bills and retail transactions in the state. In 2021, Sarawak Pay was rebranded into "S Pay Global", following integration with Union Pay that enables international transaction.

In 2018, Sarawak government set up Sarawak Product Pavilion in Kuala Lumpur to access better markets in Peninsular Malaysia. In 2019, Sarawak opened trade and tourism office in Singapore to attract investments and tourists from Singapore.

== See also ==
- Economy of Brunei
- Economy of Malaysia
