= Abang Johari =

Premier of Sarawak since 2017

Yang Amat Berhormat Tan Sri Datuk Patinggi Abang Johari PMN DP SPDK PSNB DA PNBS JBS MLA
- ابڠ جوهري
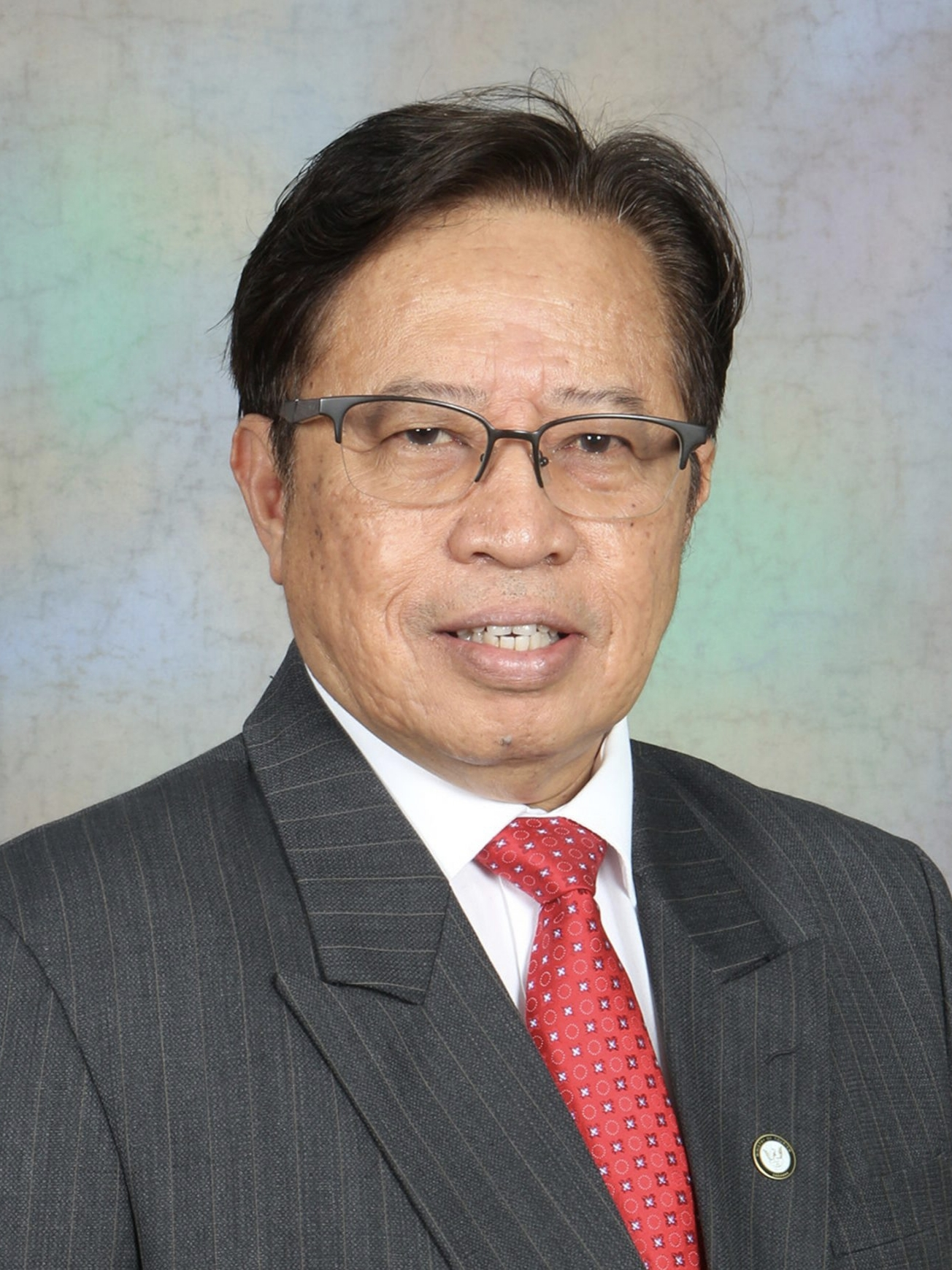
- Official portrait, 2017

6th Premier of Sarawak (Note: The office was known as Chief Minister of Sarawak until 1 March 2022, where he was the 6th Chief Minister)
- Incumbent
- Assumed office 13 January 2017
- Governor: Abdul Taib Mahmud; Wan Junaidi Tuanku Jaafar
- Deputy: Douglas Uggah Embas (from 2016); Awang Tengah Ali Hasan (from 2017); James Jemut Masing (2016–2021); Sim Kui Hian (from 2022)
- Preceded by: Adenan Satem (as Chief Minister)
- Constituency: Satok (until 2021); Gedong (from 2021)

6th President of Parti Pesaka Bumiputera Bersatu
- Incumbent
- Assumed office 13 January 2017
- Deputy: Douglas Uggah Embas; Awang Tengah Ali Hasan
- Permanent Chairman: Mohamad Asfia Awang Nassar
- Preceded by: Adenan Satem

1st Chairman of Gabungan Parti Sarawak
- Incumbent
- Assumed office 12 June 2018
- Preceded by: Position established

Member of the Sarawak State Legislative Assembly for Gedong
- Incumbent
- Assumed office 18 December 2021
- Preceded by: Naroden Majais (BN–PBB)
- Majority: 3,607 (2021)

Member of the Sarawak State Legislative Assembly for Satok
- In office 23 May 1981 – 3 November 2021
- Preceded by: Abang Abu Bakar (BN–PBB)
- Succeeded by: Ibrahim Baki (GPS–PBB)
- Majority: 5,883 (1981); 8,596 (1983); 5,585 (1987); 4,522 (1991); 5,820 (1996); 2,859 (2001); 2,798 (2006); 2,800 (2011); 5,045 (2016)
Ministerial portfolios (Sarawak)
1984–1987	Assistant Minister of Regional Development and Community Development
1987–2000	Minister of Industrial Development
2000–2004	Minister of Tourism
2004–2009	Minister of Housing
2009–2011	Minister of Housing and Urbanisation
2011–2016	Minister of Tourism
2016–2017	Deputy Chief Minister
2016–2017	Minister of Tourism, Arts and Culture
2016–2017	Minister of Housing and Urbanisation
2017–2021	Minister of Finance and Economic Planning
2017–2021	Minister of Urban Development and Resources
2022–present	Minister for Finance and New Economy

Personal details
- Born: Abang Abdul Rahman Zohari bin Abang Openg; 4 August 1950 (age 76) Limbang, Crown Colony of Sarawak
- Party: PBB (from 1977)
- Other political affiliations: BN (1977–2018); GPS (from 2018)
- Spouse: Juma'ani Tuanku Bujang (m. 1977; died 2025)
- Relations: Datu Patinggi Ali (great-great-great-grandfather); Tuanku Bujang (father-in-law)
- Children: Abang Abdillah Izzarimi Abang Abdul Rahman Zohari; Dayang Norjihan Abang Abdul Rahman Zohari
- Parent: Abang Openg (father)
- Education: Henley Business School (MBA)
- Occupation: Politician
- Website: premier.sarawak.gov.my
- Nickname: Abang Jo

Abang Abdul Rahman Zohari bin Abang Openg (Note: Nicknamed as Abang Jo.; Jawi: ابڠ عبدالرحمن زوهاري ابڠ اوڤيڠ) (born 4 August 1950) is a Malaysian politician who has served as the sixth premier of Sarawak since 2017. A member of Parti Pesaka Bumiputera Bersatu, he served as the party's president since 2017 and as member of Sarawak State Legislative Assembly for Gedong since 2021, having previously represented Satok from 1981 to 2021. Abang Johari is also the chairman of the Gabungan Parti Sarawak coalition since 2018.

Born in Limbang while his father, Abang Openg was serving as its district officer. Abang Openg subsequently became the first Yang di-Pertua Negeri of Sarawak after the formation of Malaysia in 1963. Abang Johari is descended from a Sarawak Malay family with connections to prominent Sarawak chiefs in the 19th century, including Datu Patinggi Ali. He received his early education in Kuching at Merpati Jepang Primary School, St. Thomas' School and St. Joseph's School. After completing his studies, he worked for Malaysia Airlines in corporate relations before entering politics through PBB. He subsequently pursued studies in the United Kingdom and obtained a master's degree in business administration from Henley Business School.

After being elected to the state legislative assembly in 1981, Abang Johari held several portfolios in the state administration under Chief Ministers Abdul Taib Mahmud and Adenan Satem, including industrial development, tourism, housing and urbanisation. He was appointed deputy chief minister in 2016. Following Adenan's death in January 2017, Abang Johari was sworn in as the sixth chief minister of Sarawak on 13 January 2017 and assumed the presidency of PBB. In 2018, he led PBB, together with three other Sarawak political parties, out of Barisan Nasional (BN) and formed GPS. The title of chief minister was subsequently changed to premier in March 2022.

In the 2021 state election, GPS won 76 of the 82 seats in the state legislative assembly. Abang Johari moved from Satok to contest Gedong and won the seat. In the 2022 general election, GPS won 23 of the 31 parliamentary seats in Sarawak and subsequently supported the formation of the federal government led by Anwar Ibrahim. Under his administration, Abang Johari has focused on Sarawak's position and powers within the federation, including matters relating to the Malaysia Agreement. He has also expanded Sarawak's involvement in the oil and gas sector through Petroleum Sarawak Berhad, while implementing policies relating to digitalisation, infrastructure and natural resources.

Sarawak's development policies under Abang Johari's administration have included renewable energy and emerging technologies, including hydrogen, solar energy and low-carbon technologies. The Post-Covid-19 Development Strategy 2030 has served as one of Sarawak's development frameworks in the areas of the economy, infrastructure, education, technology and human capital development. His administration has also expanded economic relations with countries in Asia and Europe in the fields of energy, technology, investment and trade, while placing emphasis on higher education as well as technical and vocational education and training. Abang Johari has been described as the "Father of Sarawak Transformation".

== Early life and education ==
Abang Johari was born on 4 August 1950 in a government quarters near Bukit Tasik Mas, Limbang, Sarawak. His original name was Abang Abdul Rahman. During his childhood, he frequently suffered from health problems, which were considered difficult to cure. Following the advice of local residents in Limbang who held traditional beliefs concerning the suitability of names, the name 'Zohari' was subsequently added to his name. According to him, his health improved after the addition of the name and that he subsequently grew up in good health.

Abang Johari was the son of Abang Openg and Dayang Masniah. He was the youngest son and the eighth of ten siblings, comprising four sons and six daughters. Abang Johari grew up in a family closely associated with the public service and administration of Sarawak. His father, Abang Openg, began his career in the Sarawak civil service in 1924 and subsequently served in various administrative positions, including as district officer of Limbang and Kuching. On 16 September 1963, he became the first governor or Yang di-Pertua Negeri of Sarawak following the formation of Malaysia. Abang Johari's mother, Dayang Masniah, was the only daughter of Abang Abdul Rahman. Through her grandfather, Abang Matusin, she was descended from Dato Patinggi Gapor, a prominent figure in the early administration of Sarawak before the arrival of James Brooke. Abang Openg and Dayang Masniah married in 1930. During his adolescence, Abang Johari and his siblings accompanied their parents on official visits to various parts of Sarawak.

Through both sides of his family, Abang Johari has ancestral connections to several prominent figures in Sarawak's history. He is a direct descendant of Dato Patinggi Gapor, who served as a leading administrator of Sarawak before the Brooke era. His ancestry also includes Datu Patinggi Ali and Raja Jarum. Through his paternal lineage, he is descended from Menteri Hussin, a grandson of the Minangkabau Raja and an ancestor of the sultans of Brunei.

Abang Johari began his primary education at Merpati Jepang Primary School in Kuching after his family moved from Limbang. He subsequently attended St. Thomas' School, an Anglican institution, from 1963 to 1967. His former classmates recalled him as a quiet, humble and friendly student who maintained friendships across ethnic and religious communities despite being the son of the governor. He later transferred to St Joseph's Secondary School, Kuching, a Catholic institution administered by the De La Salle Brothers, to complete his secondary education.

== Early career ==
After finishing school, Abang Johari then worked with Malaysia Airlines as an executive officer. He earned a Master of Business Management degree from Henley Business School, United Kingdom.

== Political career ==
=== Entry into politics ===
In the early 1970s, Sarawak had several active youth organisations, including the Federation of Sarawak Malay Youth Clubs, the Sarawak Youth Council, and the Bidayuh Youth Club. In 1972, leaders from these groups formed the Sarawak United National Youth Organisation (SABERKAS). During this time, Abang Johari was involved with SABERKAS. He also became affiliated with Parti Pesaka Bumiputera Bersatu (PBB), a significant party within the Barisan Nasional (BN) coalition at both the federal and state levels. His formal political career began in 1977 when he was appointed youth chief of PBB.

In 1981, following the resignation of the Satok state assemblyman, Abang Johari was invited by then Chief Minister Abdul Rahman Ya'kub to contest the by-election. Initially hesitant, he proposed his elder brother, Abang Abdul Karim, as a potential candidate; however, Rahman considered him too reserved for political life. After receiving encouragement from his family, particularly his mother, Abang Johari agreed to run. He won the seat and entered the Sarawak State Legislative Assembly. The following year, he was appointed principal political secretary to Chief Minister Abdul Taib Mahmud.

=== Ministerial roles ===
After his 1983 re-election, Abang Johari was appointed Assistant Minister for Regional Development and Community Development. In 1987, he became Minister of Industrial Development under Abdul Taib Mahmud's cabinet. On 29 August 1998, at the triennial delegates' conference of Parti Pesaka Bumiputera Bersatu (PBB) held at the One Hotel Santubong Kuching Resort, Abang Johari was elected as the new deputy president of PBB for the former Bumiputera Party quota, defeating Adenan Satem with 373 votes to 268. The incumbent, Abang Abu Bakar Abang Mustapha, who had held the position since 1986, received 27 votes. The election, officiated by Prime Minister Mahathir Mohamad, was conducted under tight security and amid tense conditions. Party leaders characterised the event as a family affair. Adenan was reported to have had the support of Chief Minister Abdul Taib Mahmud. However, Taib denied this, stating that he saw himself as a father figure to all three prominent figures in the race – Abang Johari, Adenan and Mohd Effendi Norwawi.

In 2001, Abang Johari took on the role of Minister of Tourism in 2000 and successfully defended his seat.

In 2004, he was appointed Minister of Housing, retaining this position through the 2006 state election. During his time there, he tackled major financial challenges when he was able to secure substantial federal allocation of RM200 million for affordable housing projects under the Eighth and Ninth Malaysia Plans within just two months in office. He played a key role in introducing the People's Friendly Housing Scheme (RMR) to Sarawak, which helped rural villagers who owned land but lacked resources to build homes. He promoted strong cooperation between the public and private sectors by creating special committees that continue to influence housing development in the state.

From 2009 to 2011, Abang Johari served as Minister of Housing and Urbanisation.

Following the 2011 election, he returned as Minister of Tourism. As tourism minister, Abang Johari identified disruptions in the aviation sector, such as changes in airline operators and the Malaysia Airlines-AirAsia share swap, as factors affecting tourism accessibility in Sarawak. He stated that these issues complicated efforts to set tourism targets and impacted domestic travel, particularly from Peninsular Malaysia and Sabah. In response, he expressed support for the idea of developing MASwings into a regional carrier to serve Sarawak, Sabah, the BIMP-EAGA region and selected Asian destinations. He also acknowledged receiving a memorandum from tourism stakeholders requesting a formal aviation policy to address logistical challenges and support regional economic interests. He also highlighted the tourism potential of areas such as the Bakun, Batang Ai and Murum dams, noting their suitability for eco-tourism and film production. Sarawak's tourism development also included the promotion of international meetings and events through the Sarawak Convention Bureau (now 'Business Event Sarawak') and facilities like the Borneo Convention Centre Kuching.

When Abdul Taib resigned as Chief Minister in 2014, Abang Johari was considered a potential successor, but Adenan Satem was appointed instead. Adenan and Abang Johari had a longstanding personal connection. In 2016, after Barisan Nasional's victory, Abang Johari was appointed Deputy Chief Minister and held the portfolios of Minister of Tourism, Arts and Culture, and Minister of Housing and Urbanisation.

== Chief ministership and premiership (2017–present) ==
=== Appointment ===
On 11 January 2017, six months after the state election, Adenan died of a heart attack at the Sarawak Heart Centre in Kota Samarahan. His death was announced by Abang Johari at a press conference, during which he provided information about the funeral arrangements. Following Adenan's death, Abang Johari, Douglas Uggah Embas and Awang Tengah Ali Hasan were identified as possible successors due to their positions as deputy presidents of the ruling party. The party delayed discussions on the appointment of a new chief minister during the mourning period.

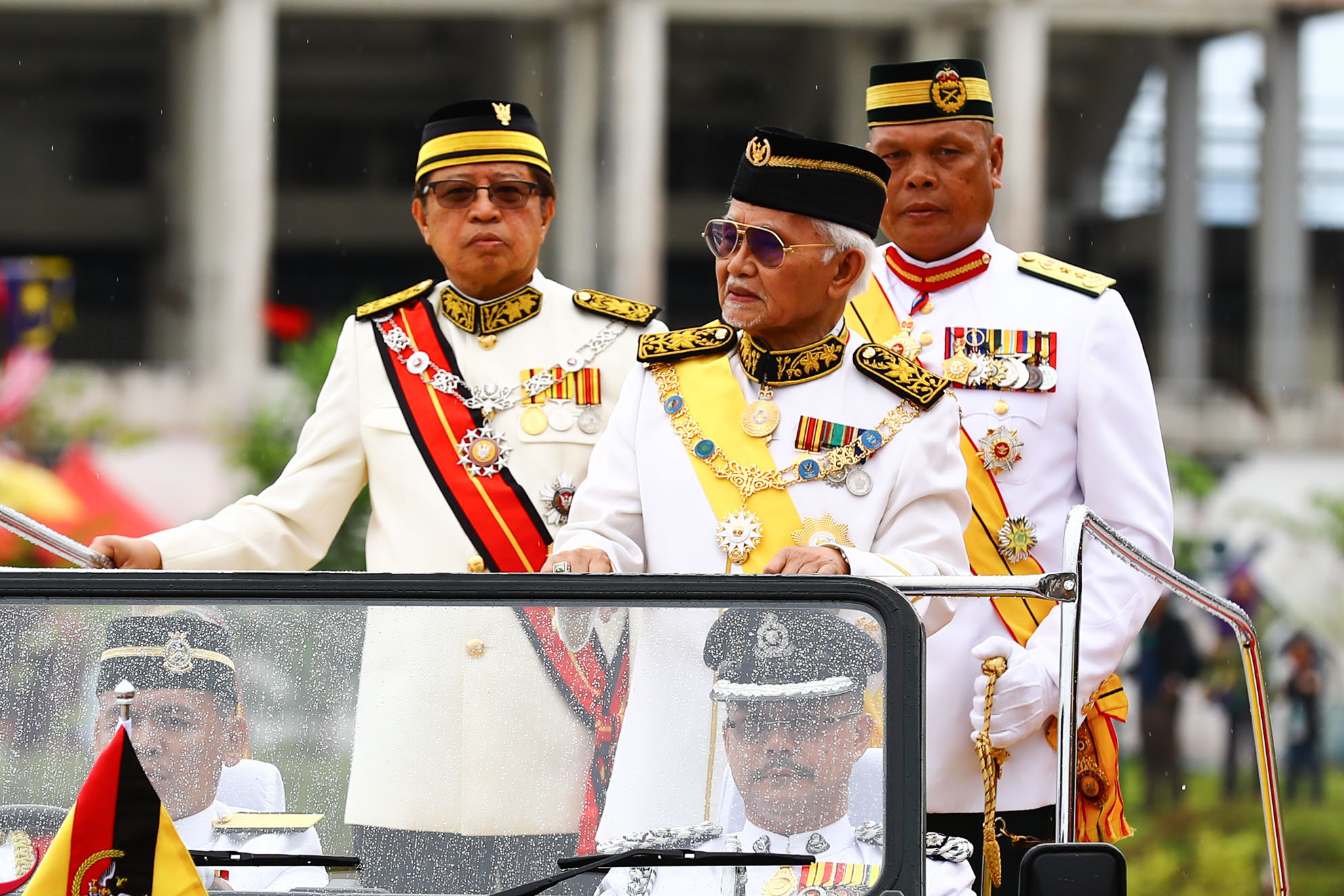
Abang Johari with Governor Abdul Taib Mahmud in 2017

Abang Johari was unanimously nominated by PBB leaders and officially appointed by Governor Abdul Taib Mahmud as the new chief minister, with the swearing-in ceremony held at the Astana on 13 January 2017. The transition proceeded without internal conflict, with senior leaders including Awang Tengah, James Jemut Masing and Uggah expressing support for Abang Johari and affirming that Adenan's 53 policy initiatives, including matters such as oil royalties, would be continued. After taking office, Abang Johari made public statements regarding his predecessor and indicated that he would retain much of the previous cabinet lineup. In May 2017, approximately five months after assuming the role, he appointed Awang Tengah Ali Hasan as deputy chief minister, filling a position that had remained vacant since his own appointment.

=== First 100 days ===
On 8 March 2017, Abang Johari announced the acquisition of 100 percent equity stake in Sarawak Hidro Sdn Bhd from the Ministry of Finance (Incorporated) and the Federal Lands Commissioner. Sarawak Hidro Sdn Bhd is the owner of the Bakun Dam. The cash transaction value for the acquisition was reported to be around RM2.5 billion, in addition to the acquisition of the company's related liabilities. The total financial commitment related to the asset is estimated to be around RM8.9 billion. Following the acquisition, the Bakun Dam assets were placed under the management of Sarawak Energy (SEB), the state government-owned energy utility company. Bakun Dam has an electricity generation capacity of 2,400 megawatts (MW) and is among the largest hydroelectric assets in Malaysia. The acquisition gives the state government a bigger role in the management of hydroelectric energy assets and planning for the development of Sarawak's energy sector, including the provision of energy for industrial projects under the Sarawak Corridor of Renewable Energy (SCORE).

On 3 to 4 April 2017, the Sarawak government hosted the international ICT Infrastructure and Digital Economy Conference Sarawak 2017 at the Borneo Convention Centre Kuching. The conference discussed digital economy development, information and communication technology infrastructure and the use of technology in state development. At the conference, Abang Johari announced an allocation of around RM1 billion for the development of Sarawak's digital infrastructure. The allocation involved the expansion of communication networks and the improvement of telecommunications facilities, especially in rural areas. The initiative was part of the development of the state's digital economy policy which later involved the establishment of institutions such as the Sarawak Multimedia Authority and the Sarawak Digital Economy Corporation. Abang Johari also announced the establishment of the Development Bank of Sarawak (DBOS) as a development finance institution wholly owned by the state government. The establishment process commenced following approval from Bank Negara Malaysia on 31 March 2017, with the announcement made on 3 April 2017. DBOS was incorporated on 11 May 2017 and officially launched on 3 November 2017. The institution was established to provide financing facilities for strategic development projects in Sarawak, including infrastructure, utilities, urban development and public amenities sectors.

Abang Johari also restructured Sarawak's cabinet portfolios, including the creation of a portfolio related to education, science and technological research. Michael Manyin Jawong was appointed to oversee the portfolio. The Sarawak government subsequently introduced initiatives related to STEM education, including the establishment of the Sarawak STEM Education Lab in Kuching. The state government also continued funding for the construction of educational facilities and the upgrading of rural schools. Meanwhile, Abang Johari continued the Sarawak government's stance on the state's rights in the management of natural resources based on the Malaysia Agreement 1963 (MA63) and state legislation relating to oil and gas. The Sarawak government reviewed the legal position relating to the Oil Mining Ordinance (OMO) 1958 as part of efforts to strengthen the state's role in the oil and gas sector. The discussion regarding the regulatory powers of the oil and gas industry is also related to the process of establishing Petroleum Sarawak Berhad (PETROS) in 2017.

=== Foreign policy ===
Abang Johari made his first international visit to China as chief minister in March 2017, leading a delegation to Beijing with the goal of enhancing international cooperation in tourism and economic development. A memorandum of understanding between the Sarawak Economic Development Corporation and Beijing Glory International Culture Development Co Ltd. outlining possible areas of collaboration, including positioning Kuching as a Southeast Asia hub for China Express Airlines, partnering with Beijing Glory for the management of hotels and national parks in Sarawak, expanding tourism connectivity with markets in China, South Korea and Japan, and rebranding Sarawak's tourism assets to attract more international visitors. The visit also included stops in Kunming, Hong Kong, and Guangzhou to identify further partnership opportunities.

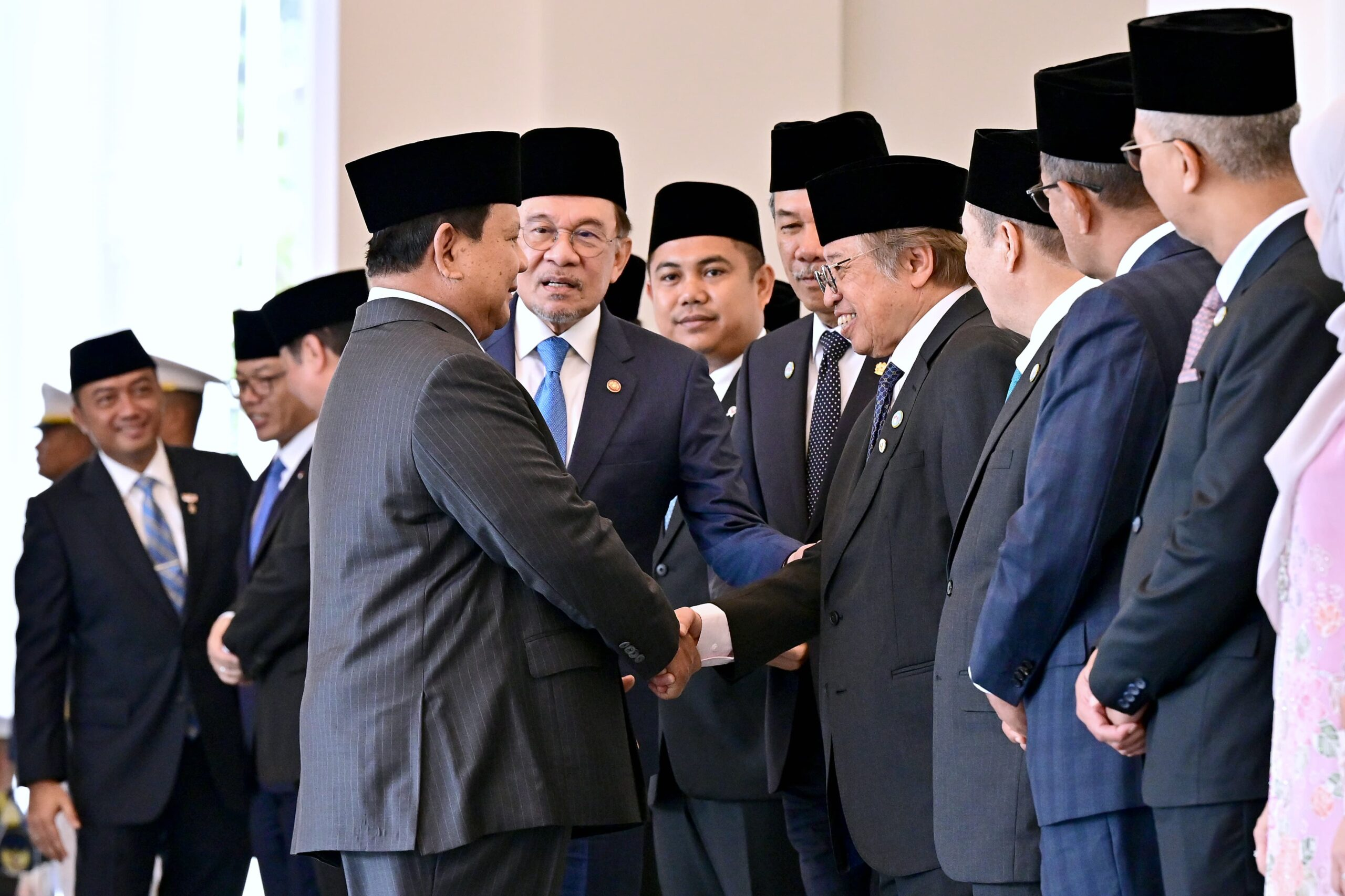
Abang Johari greets Indonesian President Prabowo Subianto in Jakarta, 2025

During the "Lan Berambeh Anak Sarawak UK-Edition" event in London on 3 May 2025, Abang Johari introduced a development roadmap extending to 2035. The event also marked the start of an annual international engagement platform aimed at connecting with the Sarawakian diaspora and enhancing global visibility for the state.

=== Economic policy ===
Abang Johari's economic strategy prioritized revenue growth, diversification and sustainable development. From 2017 to 2024, Sarawak's state revenue increased from RM5.6 billion to RM14.2 billion, with projections reaching RM20 billion by 2025. The additional revenue allowed for expanded budgets and state-led development initiatives. To reduce dependence on federal funding, the Development Bank of Sarawak (DBOS) was created as a state-controlled infrastructure financing vehicle.

Diversification focused on attracting high-value investments. Between 2021 and 2023, Sarawak approved RM21.5 billion in investments and created around 11,000 jobs. Key sectors included renewable energy (especially hydropower and hydrogen), semiconductors, aerospace and digital services. A sovereign wealth fund was also introduced to manage excess revenue and support future investment.

The Sarawak Digital Economy Strategy focused on digital infrastructure, e-commerce growth and innovation. Hydrogen production and exports, including international cooperation with countries like Japan, formed a core part of Sarawak's green energy plan. Sustainability was integrated into infrastructure development, which included 31,000 km of roads, major bridges, airport upgrades and broader utility access.

Support for small and medium-sized enterprises (SMEs) included financing, training and expanded market access. Workforce development policies emphasized industry-aligned education, with free education starting in 2025.

The Post-COVID-19 Development Strategy 2030 outlined a model for sustainable, inclusive growth. According to the World Bank, Sarawak achieved high-income status ahead of the 2030 target. Throughout, economic planning remained focused on resilience and long-term adaptability.

From 4 to 5 May 2025 in Toulouse, France, Abang Johari witnessed the signing of a joint venture agreement between Malaysia's AIROD and France's SATYS, a company specialising in aerospace surface treatment and painting services. The agreement supports the development of Sarawak's air transport sector and involves discussions with ATR and Airbus on the use of energy-efficient turboprop aircraft for rural air services in Sarawak. These talks included plans for technology transfer and workforce training in aviation. On 7 May in Abu Dhabi, Abang Johari witnessed the signing of a strategic partnership between Bintulu Port Holdings Berhad and AD Ports Group. The agreement sets the stage for collaboration in maritime logistics, infrastructure development and trade facilitation. The Premier also visited Zayed International Airport to study the port and airport models in Abu Dhabi, which guided the future development of Sarawak's logistics and transportation infrastructure.

=== Environmental and climate policy ===
On 1 May 2025, Abang Johari held meetings with the International Hydropower Association (IHA) and the Global Renewables Alliance (GRA) focused on expanding Sarawak's renewable energy initiatives. In addition to hydropower, Sarawak is exploring solar energy, hydrogen production and advanced energy storage solutions, aligning with international goals for carbon reduction and energy transition. The following day, Sarawak began reviewing the carbon levy frameworks used in Scotland and the wider UK to inform its own approach to managing carbon-related revenues. The focus is on creating an equitable revenue-sharing and regulatory model that can support emerging sectors such as carbon capture, utilisation and storage (CCUS).

=== Social policy ===
The state government under the leadership of Abang Johari implemented various social policies focused on religious inclusivity, indigenous rights, social welfare, education and infrastructure development. In 2017, the government established the Other Religious Affairs Unit (UNIFOR) to support non-Muslim communities. This unit, led by Deputy Premier Douglas Uggah Embas, manages state funding for maintaining places of worship across multiple religions and promotes religious harmony. The UNIFOR Complex in Kuching, a multi-purpose facility for social and religious activities, is scheduled to open in early 2025.

Abang Johari publicly emphasized freedom of religion and expressed opposition to the national implementation of hudud law, citing concerns about potential discrimination against non-Muslims. He has defended the right of non-Muslims in Sarawak to use the word "Allah", when such occurrences garnered controversy on Peninsular Malaysia.

A land survey program was launched in 2020 to document indigenous land ownership as part of a focus on protecting Native Customary Rights (NCR). Efforts were also made to support cultural development for ethnic groups including the Dayak and Malay communities, such as the establishment of the Wisma Melayu Sarawak building.

Several social welfare programs were introduced, including medical aid for seniors (RM500), an endowment for newborns (RM1,000), post-natal allowances for Sarawakian mothers (RM450), basic needs assistance, pocket money for tertiary students (RM1,200), free laptops and book vouchers. Starting in 2026, the state plans to provide free university education at state-owned institutions without bonding or mobility restrictions.

At the Asean Sarawak Business and Economic Forum 2025, Abang Johari was conferred the 2024 World Outstanding Muslim Leader of the Year Award.

=== Education policy ===
Sarawak retained English as a medium of instruction in its education system and focused on improving quality and access. Infrastructure projects aimed to reduce rural-urban disparities through improvements to roads, bridges, water supply and electrification. The government has also supported initiatives related to digital economy and green economy development.

On 30 April 2025, in London and Cambridge, Abang Johari witnessed the signing of a service contract between Cambridge University Press and Assessment and Swinburne Innovation Malaysia. The agreement supports standardised assessments for Sarawak's Dual Language Programme (DLP), beginning with Year 6 students in October 2025. The following day, Abang Johari held discussions with Larry Kramer, president and vice-chancellor of the London School of Economics (LSE), exploring collaborations in public policy, economics and sustainability. These engagements reflect Sarawak's efforts to align local education standards with global benchmarks and strengthen policy development capacity.

=== Technology and innovation policy ===
In September 2017, Abang Johari visited Estonia in an effort to advance Sarawak's digital development by learning from countries with established digital systems. During the visit, he examined Estonia's digital infrastructure, including its nationwide high-speed internet supported by underground fiber-optic networks, decentralised service delivery and integrated electronic payment systems. These features have played a central role in Estonia's approach to e-government and public service efficiency. The visit provided insights for Sarawak's own digital transformation efforts, including the enhancement of the Sarawak Pay platform and broader initiatives in digital governance. Discussions during the trip also opened potential areas for collaboration between Sarawak and Estonia in fields such as digital public services, smart infrastructure and technology-driven governance.

In April 2025, Abang Johari visited Cardiff, Wales, where he launched KETEQ AI, the world's first AI-powered power conversion device, developed entirely by Sarawakian engineers. Hosted at the CSA Catapult facility, the launch is a milestone under the Sarawak Semiconductor Roadmap 2030. It signals Sarawak's growing focus on deep-tech innovation and its shift from a resource-based to a knowledge-driven economy.

=== Constitutional and institutional policy ===
Following the 2018 general election, the Gabungan Parti Sarawak (GPS)-led state government has pushed for more autonomy. One outcome was Sarawak gaining exclusive control over buying and selling its own natural gas, a key step toward fiscal independence.

== Personal life ==
=== Marriage ===
Abang Johari married Juma'ani Tuanku Bujang, the daughter of the second Yang di-Pertua Negeri of Sarawak, Tuanku Bujang, on 26 February 1977. Juma'ani's father, Tuanku Bujang, served as the second governor of Sarawak. They were introduced through a family meeting in Kuching arranged by their parents based on an existing familial relationship between the families of Tuanku Bujang and Abang Johari's father, Abang Openg, through the maternal lineage of Tuanku Bujang. They had not previously known each other personally and first met at the family gathering when Juma'ani was 29 and Abang Johari was 27. Following the meeting, both agreed to marry, and their marriage was solemnised later that year. As a wedding gift, they received a house adjoining Tuanku Bujang's official residence in Kuching, where they lived during the early years of their marriage.

At the time of their marriage, Abang Johari was working as an executive with Malaysia Airlines while beginning his involvement in politics. After he was elected to the Sarawak State Legislative Assembly for Satok in 1981, Juma'ani became a full-time homemaker and took primary responsibility for managing the household and raising their children while Abang Johari pursued his political career. They had two children, Abang Abdillah Izzarim, born in 1980, and Dayang Norjihan, born in 1982. Juma'ani was involved in charitable and community activities, including through the Association of Wives of Ministers and Deputy Ministers of Sarawak, of which she became president in 2017. She also accompanied Abang Johari at various official functions, particularly after he became the head of government of Sarawak in 2017. The couple generally maintained their family life away from extensive media coverage although their joint attendance at official, cultural and community events was occasionally reported.

Abang Johari and Juma'ani were married for 48 years until her death on 23 June 2025, aged 76, at Normah Specialist Medical Centre in Kuching. Following her death, Abang Johari continued his official duties and publicly acknowledged the support he had received from his wife throughout his political career. He subsequently began bringing their daughter, Dayang Norjihan, to some official functions, including in a role that helped fill the protocol role previously occupied by his wife. He has also been reported to regularly visit Juma'ani's grave at the Samariang Muslim Cemetery in Kuching, particularly on Friday mornings, where he and his daughter recite prayers for her. In June 2026, Abang Johari and Dayang Norjihan visited her grave to mark the first anniversary of her death.

Abang Johari enjoys home-cooked meals, with his preferred dish being "masak merah" chicken briyani rice. He is a football fan and supports Manchester United. He has attended a match at Old Trafford and often uses football metaphors in his leadership approach to illustrate values like teamwork, shared responsibility and leadership. He compared Sarawak's economic restructuring to the rebuilding of the Manchester United team under Alex Ferguson, emphasising the "Ngap Sayot" spirit as essential to the state's development.

His son, Abang Abdillah Izzarim, works as a commercial and private pilot and is involved in technology and business. He leads several ventures in ASEAN and China, and serves as executive chairman at AIZO Group Bhd (formerly Minetech Resources Bhd).

In March 2022, Abang Johari tested positive for COVID-19.

Abang Johari currently served as the pro-chancellor of Universiti Malaysia Sarawak since March 2017. He has also been the pro-chancellor of Swinburne University of Technology Sarawak Campus since his first appointment in March 2017. In March 2021, he was appointed as the first chancellor of i-CATS University College. In March 2022, he was appointed as the first pro-chancellor of University of Technology Sarawak.

== Election results ==
Sarawak State Legislative Assembly
Year	Constituency	Candidate	Votes	Pct	Opponent(s)	Votes	Pct	Ballots cast	Majority	Turnout
1981	N06 Satok	Abang Johari (PBB)	7,857	79.90%	Wan Ahmadul Badwi (PAJAR)	1,974	20.10%	9,983	5,883	54.20%
1983	N06 Satok	Abang Johari (PBB)	10,234	86.20%	Abang Bunsu @ Abang Ariffin (SUDP)	1,638	13.80%	12,118	8,596	63.00%
1987	N06 Satok	Abang Johari (PBB)	9,760	69.60%	Wan Ali Tuanku Madhi (PERMAS)	4,175	29.80%	14,139	5,585	70.6%
1987	N06 Satok	Abang Johari (PBB)	9,760	69.60%	Abang Bungsu @ Abang Ariffin (SUDP)	84	0.60%	14,139	5,585	70.6%
1991	N06 Satok	Abang Johari (PBB)	5,550	84.37%	Faisal Othman (PERMAS)	1,028	15.63%	6,578	4,522	62.50%
1996	N06 Satok	Abang Johari (PBB)	6,628	89.13%	Sharkawi Faisal Othman (IND)	808	10.87%	7,436	5,820	60.91%
2001	N06 Satok	Abang Johari (PBB)	4,830	71.02%	Zulrusdi Mohamad Hol (PKR)	1,971	28.98%	6,801	2,859	63.01%
2006	N08 Satok	Abang Johari (PBB)	4,222	74.78%	Mohamad Jolhi (PKR)	1,424	25.22%	5,646	2,798	53.88%
2011	N08 Satok	Abang Johari (PBB)	4,691	71.27%	Ahmad Nazib Johari (PKR)	1,891	28.73%	6,582	2,800	64.39%
2016	N08 Satok	Abang Johari (PBB)	6,854	79.12%	Mohammad Salleh Shawkatali (PKR)	1,809	20.88%	8,663	5,045	64.97%
2021	N26 Gedong	Abang Johari (PBB)	4,310	81.88%	Mohamad Sofian Fariz Sharbini (PSB)	703	13.35%	5,264	3,607	73.05%
2021	N26 Gedong	Abang Johari (PBB)	4,310	81.88%	Kamal Bujang (AMANAH)	94	1.79%	5,264	3,607	73.05%
2021	N26 Gedong	Abang Johari (PBB)	4,310	81.88%	Tomson Ango (PBK)	157	2.98%	5,264	3,607	73.05%

== Honours ==
=== Honours of Malaysia ===
- Malaysia
  - Commander of the Order of the Defender of the Realm (PMN) – Tan Sri (2021)
  - Recipient of the 17th Yang di-Pertuan Agong Installation Medal
- Sarawak
  - Grand Principal of the Order of the Star of Hornbill Sarawak (DP) – Datuk Patinggi (2017)
  - Grand Commander of the Order of the Star of Hornbill Sarawak (DA) – Datuk Amar (2008)
  - Grand Commander of the Order of the Star of Sarawak (PNBS) – Dato Sri (1990)
  - Companion of the Order of the Star of Sarawak (JBS) (1985)
- Sabah
  - Grand Commander of the Order of Kinabalu (SPDK) – Datuk Seri Panglima (2024)

=== Foreign honours ===
- Brunei
  - Grand Commander of the Order of Setia Negara Brunei (PSNB) – Dato Seri Setia (2024)
- Japan
  - 2nd Class of the Order of the Rising Sun, Gold and Silver Star (2025)

=== Honorary degrees ===
- Malaysia
  - Honorary Doctorate in Business and Management from University of Technology Sarawak (2017)
  - Honorary Doctorate in Economic Development Degree from Universiti Malaysia Sarawak (2019)
- Australia
  - Honorary Doctorate of the University Award from Swinburne University of Technology (2019)

== Notes ==
Political offices
Preceded by Adenan Satem	6th Chief Minister of Sarawak; 2017–2022	Position abolished Became Premier of Sarawak
New office Previously Chief Minister of Sarawak	Premier of Sarawak; 2022–	Incumbent
