= Satok (state constituency) =

State constituency in Sarawak, Malaysia

Satok (N08)
Sarawak constituency

State constituency
- Legislature: Sarawak State Legislative Assembly
MLA
Vacant
- Constituency created: 1977
- First contested: 1979
- Last contested: 2026

Satok is a state constituency in Sarawak, Malaysia, that has been represented in the Sarawak State Legislative Assembly since 1979.

The state constituency was created in the 1977 redistribution and is mandated to return a single member to the Sarawak State Legislative Assembly under the first past the post voting system.

== Demographics ==
Ethnic breakdown of Satok's electorate as of 2022
1. Malay-Muslim bumiputera (68.7%)
2. Chinese (21.0%)
3. Sarawak bumiputera (8.40%)
4. Other ethnicities (1.90%)

== History ==
As of 2020, Satok has a population of 14,456 people.

=== Polling districts ===
According to the gazette issued on 31 October 2022, the Satok constituency has a total of 8 polling districts.

State constituency	Polling Districts	Code	Location
Satok (N08)	Segedup	194/08/01	Tabika Kemas Kpg. Sg. Maong; Dewan Serbaguna Kpg. Segedup
Satok (N08)	Patingan	194/08/02	Dewan Datuk Merpati Jepang
Satok (N08)	Satok	194/08/03	SK Rakyat Jln. Haji Bolhasaan
Satok (N08)	Masjid	194/08/04	SMJK Chung Hua No.4 Jln. Haji Taha
Satok (N08)	Maderasah	194/08/05	Ibu Pejabat Bulan Sabit Merah
Satok (N08)	Reservoir	194/08/06	SK St. Joseph Jln. Were
Satok (N08)	Nanas	194/08/07	SJK (C) Chung Hua No. 4
Satok (N08)	Patinggi Ali	194/08/08	SK Merpati Jepang

=== Representation history ===
Members of the Legislative Assembly for Satok
Assembly		Years	Member	Party
Constituency created from Kuching Barat and Sekama
10th	N06	1979-1981	Abang Abu Bakar Abang Mustapha	BN (PBB)
10th	N06	1981-1983	Abang Abdul Rahman Zohari Abang Openg	BN (PBB)
11th	N06	1983-1987	Abang Abdul Rahman Zohari Abang Openg	BN (PBB)
12th	N06	1987-1991	Abang Abdul Rahman Zohari Abang Openg	BN (PBB)
13th	N06	1991-1996	Abang Abdul Rahman Zohari Abang Openg	BN (PBB)
14th	N06	1996-2001	Abang Abdul Rahman Zohari Abang Openg	BN (PBB)
15th	N06	2001-2006	Abang Abdul Rahman Zohari Abang Openg	BN (PBB)
16th	N08	2006-2011	Abang Abdul Rahman Zohari Abang Openg	BN (PBB)
17th	N08	2011-2016	Abang Abdul Rahman Zohari Abang Openg	BN (PBB)
18th	N08	2016-2018	Abang Abdul Rahman Zohari Abang Openg	BN (PBB)
18th	N08	2018–2021	Abang Abdul Rahman Zohari Abang Openg	GPS (PBB)
19th	N08	2021–2026	Ibrahim Baki	GPS (PBB)

== Election results ==
Sarawak state election, 2026
Party	Candidate	Votes	%	∆%
GPS	Ibrahim Baki			▲
PH				▲
Total valid votes				
Total rejected ballots				
Unreturned ballots				
Turnout				
Registered electors				
Majority				

Sarawak state election, 2021
Party	Candidate	Votes	%	∆%
GPS	Ibrahim Baki	6,991	83.58	▲83.58
PKR	Nor Irwan Ahmat Nor	958	11.45	▼9.43
PBK	Awang Badele Awang Ali	415	4.96	▲4.96
Total valid votes		8,364	100.00	
Total rejected ballots		71		
Unreturned ballots		52		
Turnout		8,487	59.29	▼5.68
Registered electors		14,314		
Majority		6,033	72.11	▲13.84
GPS gain from BN		Swing		?
Source(s) https://lom.agc.gov.my/ilims/upload/portal/akta/outputp/1718688/PUB687.pdf

Sarawak state election, 2016
Party	Candidate	Votes	%	∆%
BN	Abang Abdul Rahman Zohari Abang Openg	6,854	79.12	▲7.85
PKR	Mohamed Salleh Shawkatali	1,809	20.88	▼7.85
Total valid votes		8,663	100.00	
Total rejected ballots		96		
Unreturned ballots		44		
Turnout		8,803	64.97	▲0.58
Registered electors		13,550		
Majority		5,045	58.27	▲15.71
BN hold		Swing		
Source(s) "Federal Government Gazette - Notice of Contested Election, State Legislative Assembly of the State of Sarawak [P.U. (B) 190/2016]" (PDF). Attorney General's Chambers of Malaysia. 25 April 2016. Archived from the original (PDF) on 2017-06-12. "Senarai Calon yang Disahkan Layak Bertanding Pilihan Raya Dewan Undangan Negeri ke-11". Election Commission of Malaysia. 25 April 2016. Archived from the original on 25 April 2016.

Sarawak state election, 2011
Party	Candidate	Votes	%	∆%
BN	Abang Abdul Rahman Zohari Abang Openg	4,691	71.27	▼3.51
PKR	Ahmad Nazib Johari	1,891	28.73	▲3.51
Total valid votes		6,582	100.00	
Total rejected ballots		79		
Unreturned ballots		56		
Turnout		6,717	64.39	▲10.51
Registered electors		10,431		
Majority		2,800	42.56	▼7.04
BN hold		Swing		
Source(s) "Federal Government Gazette - Results of Contested Election and Statements of the Poll after the Official Addition of Votes Sarawak [P.U. (B) 245/2011]" (PDF). Attorney General's Chambers of Malaysia. 29 April 2011.

Sarawak state election, 2006
Party	Candidate	Votes	%	∆%
BN	Abang Abdul Rahman Zohari Abang Openg	4,222	74.78	▲3.76
PKR	Mohamad Jolhi	1,424	25.22	▼3.76
Total valid votes		5,646	100.00	
Total rejected ballots		67		
Unreturned ballots		125		
Turnout		5,838	53.88	▼9.13
Registered electors		10,835		
Majority		2,798	49.60	▲7.57
BN hold		Swing		

Sarawak state election, 2001
Party	Candidate	Votes	%	∆%
BN	Abang Abdul Rahman Zohari Abang Openg	4,830	71.02	▼18.11
PKR	Zulrusdi Mohamad Hol	1,971	28.98	▲28.98
Total valid votes		6,801	100.00	
Total rejected ballots		227		
Unreturned ballots		58		
Turnout		7,086	63.01	▲2.10
Registered electors		11,246		
Majority		2,859	42.03	▼36.27
BN hold		Swing		

Sarawak state election, 1996
Party	Candidate	Votes	%	∆%
BN	Abang Abdul Rahman Zohari Abang Openg	6,628	89.13	▲4.76
Independent	Sharkawi Faisal Othman	808	10.87	▲10.87
Total valid votes		7,436	100.00	
Total rejected ballots		102		
Unreturned ballots		260		
Turnout		7,798	60.91	▼1.59
Registered electors		12,803		
Majority		5,820	78.30	▲9.54
BN hold		Swing		

Sarawak state election, 1991
Party	Candidate	Votes	%	∆%
BN	Abang Abdul Rahman Zohari Abang Openg	5,550	84.37	▼14.77
PERMAS	Faisal Othman	1,028	15.63	▲15.63
Total valid votes		6,578	100.00	
Total rejected ballots		96		
Unreturned ballots		196		
Turnout		6,870	62.50	▼8.15
Registered electors		10,992		
Majority		4,522	68.76	▲28.93
BN hold		Swing		

Sarawak state election, 1987
Party	Candidate	Votes	%	∆%
BN	Abang Abdul Rahman Zohari Abang Openg	9,760	69.62	▼16.58
PERMAS	Wan Ali Tuanku Mahdi	4,175	29.78	▲12.84
Sarawak Demokratik Bersatu	Abang Ariffin Abang Sebli	84	0.60	▲0.60
Total valid votes		14,019	100.00	
Total rejected ballots		120		
Unreturned ballots		0		
Turnout		14,139	70.65	▼2.95
Registered electors		20,014		
Majority		5,585	39.83	▼2.33
BN hold		Swing		

Sarawak state election, 1983
Party	Candidate	Votes	%	∆%
BN	Abang Abdul Rahman Zohari Abang Openg	10,234	86.20	▲8.60
Sarawak Demokratik Bersatu	Abang Ariffin Abang Sebli	1,638	13.80	▲13.80
Total valid votes		11,872	100.00	
Total rejected ballots		246		
Unreturned ballots		0		
Turnout		12,118	62.98	▼10.62
Registered electors		19,242		
Majority		8,596	72.40	▲8.24
BN hold		Swing		

Sarawak state by-election, 23 May 1981 Upon the resignation of incumbent, Abang Abu Bakar Abang Mustapha
Party	Candidate	Votes	%	∆%
On the nomination day, Abang Abdul Rahman Zohari Abang Openg won uncontested.
BN	Abang Abdul Rahman Zohari Abang Openg			
Total valid votes				
Total rejected ballots				
Unreturned ballots				
Turnout				
Registered electors				
BN hold		Swing		

Sarawak state election, 1979
Party	Candidate	Votes	%
BN	Abang Abu Bakar Abang Mustapha	10,506	77.60
Parti Anak Jati Sarawak	Wan Ahmadul Badwi Wan	2,293	16.94
Independent	Kho King Hing	740	5.46
Total valid votes		12,799	100.00
Total rejected ballots		197	
Unreturned ballots		0	
Turnout		13,736	73.60
Registered electors		18,662	
Majority		8,213	64.16
This was a new constituency created.
