= Ibrahim Baki =

Malaysian politician

Yang Berhormat Dato Haji Ibrahim Baki MLA PSBS
- إبراهيم باقي

Deputy Minister for Utility and Telecommunication
- Incumbent
- Assumed office 2025 Serving with Abdul Rahman Junaidi (Utility); Liwan Lagang (Telecomunication)
- Governor: Wan Junaidi Tuanku Jaafar
- Premier: Abang Johari

Member of the Sarawak State Legislative Assembly for Satok
- Incumbent
- Assumed office 2022
- Preceded by: Abang Johari

Personal details
- Born: Ibrahim bin Baki; 1960 (age 65–66)
- Citizenship: Malaysian
- Party: PBB
- Other party: Gabungan Parti Sarawak
- Occupation: Politician

Ibrahim bin Haji Baki is a Malaysian politician from PBB. He has served as the Member of the Sarawak State Legislative Assembly for Satok since 2021. He is also the Deputy Minister for Utility in Sarawak since 2025.

== Election results ==
Sarawak State Legislative Assembly
Year	Constituency	Candidate	Votes	Pct.	Opponent(s)	Votes	Pct.	Ballots cast	Majority	Turnout
2021	N08 Satok	Ibrahim Baki (PBB)	6,991	83.58%	Nor Irwan Ahmat Nor (PKR)	958	11.45%	8,487	6,033	59.29%
2021	N08 Satok	Ibrahim Baki (PBB)	6,991	83.58%	Awang Badele Awang Ali (PBK)	415	4.96%	8,487	6,033	59.29%

== Honours ==
- Sarawak :
  - Commander of the Most Exalted Order of the Star of Sarawak (PSBS) – Dato (2019)
