= Sama Jaya Free Industrial Zone =

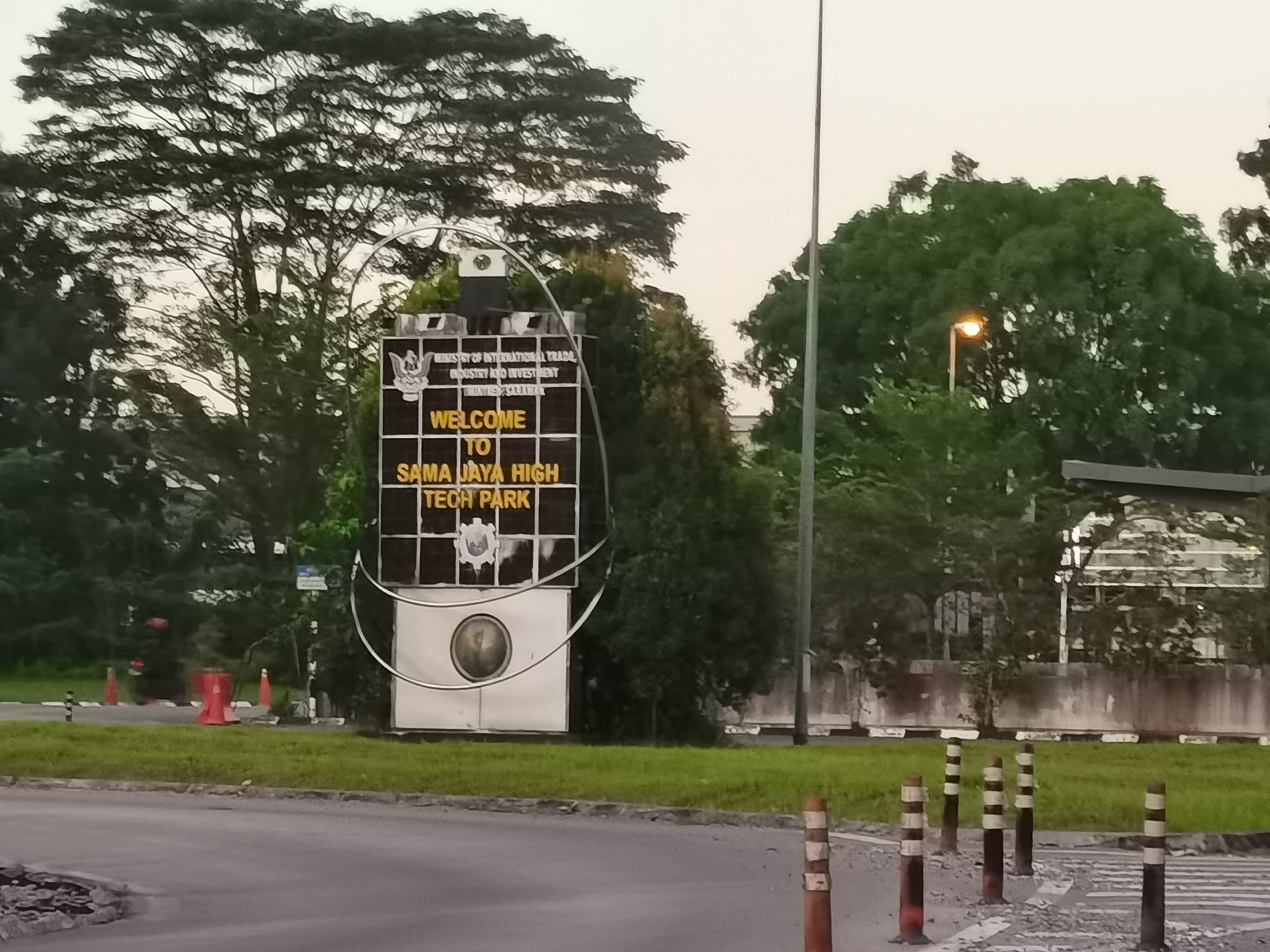
- Front gate of Sama Jaya Park
- Country: Malaysia
- State: Sarawak
- City: Kuching
- Establishment: 1991

Government
  - Type: Government of Sarawak
  - Body: Ministry of International Trade and Industry, Industrial Terminal dan Entrepreneur Development (MINTRED)

Area
  - Total: 813 ha (2,010 acres)
- Time zone: UTC+8 (MST)

Sama Jaya Free Industrial Zone is an industrial zone located in Kuching, Sarawak, Malaysia.

== History ==
Sama Jaya was established and managed by Ministry of Industrial Development Sarawak (MID) in 1991. MID later regroup into Ministry of International Trade and Industry, Industrial Terminal ann Entrepreneur Development (MINTRED) in 2019. Due to availability of cheap land and labour, it attracted investments from the United States and Japan.

In 1995, Japanese electronics manufacturer, Toko Electronics, became the first company to establish a factory in this zone. This was followed by Japanese electronics company Taiyo Yuden, and American hard disk manufacturer Komag (now subsidiary of Western Digital).

In 1996, US printed circuit board manufacturer named Zyco (now known as Sanmina Corporation) open their factories there.

In 1998, the Sarawak state government, Malaysian federal government, and Interconnect Technology started a project on creating the first integrated circuit fabrication plant in Borneo named 1st Silicon. However, the deal did not materialise due to a lack of funding and technology partners. However, in 1999, the project was revived with US$200 million cash injection from Commerzbank AG of Germany with Sharp Corporation as the technology partner. An 8-inch, 0.25-micron wafer fabrication facility was built in Sama Jaya and became operational in 2001. By 2002, the cost of the fabrication plant swelled to RM 6.5 billion (US$1.7 billion). In 2005, 1st Silicon announced the production of 0.13 micron wafers, first in Malaysia to do so. Despite making losses over the years, Sarawak state government continued to invest in 1st Silicon for the benefit of the future generation. In September 2006, 1st Silicon completed merger with Germany-based X-Fab Silicon Foundries, to form X-Fab Sarawak Sdn Bhd where X-Fab holds 58% of the shares and Sarawak government holds 35% minority stake. Meanwhile, all 1st Silicon outstanding debt will be borne by the government of Sarawak.

In 2009, Western Digital decided to pull out of Sarawak and close its manufacturing plant in Sama Jaya. However, after an intervention from the Sarawak government, Western Digital decided to sell the plant to Hitachi Global Storage Technologies (HGST).

In 2010, Malaysian government set up a plan to transform the zone into a solar industry hub specialising in downstream processing. United States-based MEMC Electronic Material Corporation (now SunEdison, subsidiary of LONGi), invested RM 710 million to build a solar wafer producing plant in the zone.

In 2012, Sanmina Corporation decided to close its facilities in Sama Jaya and moved its operations to Wuxi, China for cost saving measures. Other causes of this move could be due to expensive transportation costs, inadequate infrastructure support, and lack of employable human capital.

In 2015, there were 16 investors operating inside the industrial zone.

In 2016, OM Group Electronic Chemicals which specialises in chemical products manufacturing, was acquired by Element Solutions and underwent restructuring exercises.

During the COVID-19 pandemic in April 2020, all factories in Sama Jaya were operating at 20 to 30% capacity during Movement Control Order (MCO) period. In June 2021, Taiyo Yuden factory was forced to close down for 14 days due to a high number of COVID-19 infections among the workers. In September 2021, Tabung Ekonomi Gagasan Anak Sarawak (Sarawak people's Vision Economic Fund) (Tegas) Digital Village (TDV) was opened in Sama Jaya to promote digital innovation and entrepreneurship in the state. In December 2021, Sarawak government announced that Sama Jaya industrial zone was nearing its full operational capacity and proposed plans to build another high-tech park at Kota Samarahan.

In November 2022, the Sarawak Microelectronics Design (SMD) company was launched in TEGAS Digital Village; partnering with Belgium-based semiconductor company Melexis. SMD provides chip design services to X-Fab. SMD later moved its office to La Promenade mall near the Kuching-Samarahan Expressway. Melexis opened its wafer testing site in the industrial zone in 2024.

== Infrastructure and incentives ==
Companies inside Sama Jaya are exempted from sales and services tax. Besides, companies given pioneer status inside the zone are exempted from import and export tariffs, 35% corporate income tax, and 5% development tax for five to ten years. After expiry of the income tax exemption, the company can also apply for investment tax credit exemption for additional five to ten years. Sarawak state government offers subsidies of water, electricity and also other physical infrastructure support in the zone.

Sama Jaya is located 12 km from Kuching International Airport, 6 km from Kuching port and 16 km from the city centre. Roads, drainage systems, electricity substations, water supplies, and telephone networks were constructed here. IPVPN, fibre optics and ADL/ADSL internet connections are available.

In 2015, X-Fab signed a memorandum of understanding (MoU) with the engineering faculty of Universiti Malaysia Sarawak (UNIMAS) on research and development. X-Fab also expanded its collaboration with Swinburne University of Technology Sarawak Campus.

East Coast Freight Forwarders is involved in integrated logistics, international freight forwarding, warehouses, and distribution of manufactured goods in the zone.

== Tenants ==
- X-Fab - wafer design, processing, masking, assembly, and testing
- Taiyo Yuden - inductors, common mode choke coils, ring varistors, balun transformers, wireless modules, aluminum electrolytic capacitors, and solar power generation products
- LONGi Green Energy Technology. Subsidiary: SunEdison Kuching (previously MEMC Kuching in 2010) - Whole mono photovoltaic industry chain
- Western Digital. Subsidiary: Hitachi Global Storage Technologies (HGST) Malaysia - storage device manufacturing
- Murata Manufacturing. Subsidiary: Toko Electronics - induction coils production
- Active Point - general trading
- SE Micro Engineering - precision machined parts, nozzle manufacturing
- Kwong Seng Cheong Food Industries - supply halal food for Taiyo Yuden
- Iljin Group. Subsidiary: IMM Technology Sdn Bhd - Elecfoil manufacturing
- Tenaga Kenari - Bare Printed Circuit Board manufacturing
- Elite Industries - jigs, fixtures, dies, molds and other custom-made parts
- Hai Shoon Group. Subsidiary: Samyoung Global Construction Malaysia - concrete supplier
- Shoei Chemical Inc. Subsidiary: SEM Malaysia - Basic inorganic chemical manufacturing
- Linde plc Malaysia - industrial nitrogen gas supply for Taiyo Yuden and LONGi

== Economy ==
The total exports from Sama Jaya were valued at RM 2.7 billion in 2016, and increased to RM 3.2 billion in 2017. The figure reached RM 4.6 billion in 2018. In 2019, total export value from the park exceeded RM 5.43 billion, followed by RM 6.93 billion in 2020. As of 2019, cumulative investments by multinational companies exceeded RM 12 billion, created 118,000 jobs where 99% of the jobs were filled up by Sarawakians.
