= Development Bank of Sarawak =

Development Bank of Sarawak Berhad
- Type: Public limited company
- Founded: 11 May 2017; 9 years ago
- Headquarters: Level 2, Menara SEDC, Lot 2878, The Isthmus, Off Jalan Bako, 93050 Kuching, Sarawak, Malaysia.
- Key people: Amar Haji Mohamad Morshidi (Chairman); Laura Lee Ngien Hion (CEO
- Owner: Government of Sarawak
- Parent: Capital Development Resources (Sarawak) Sdn Bhd
- Website: dbos.gov.my

The Development Bank of Sarawak Berhad (DBOS) (Malay: Bank Pembangunan Sarawak) is a bank owned by the Government of Sarawak.

Inspired by the Asian Development Bank and DBS Bank of Singapore, it was incorporated on 11 May 2017 as a public company limited by shares. DBOS is to carry on business as a Development Financial Institution and lending activities with sources of funding from capital injections from DBOS’ holding company, Sarawak Government's deposits and deposits from Sarawak Government's statutory bodies and linked companies. Its role is to support the Sarawak Government's efforts in the development of strategic infrastructure projects.

== History ==
The bank was first approved on 31 March 2017 by Malaysian prime minister Najib Razak. The bank's logo was crowd-sourced with a logo design competition among Sarawakians. The bank received a paid up capital of RM500 million when it starts operations on 15 January 2018. By July 2019, the bank's paid-up capital (money that are not borrowed out) increased to RM 1 billion. In November 2020, the bank is listed inside the Malaysian Ministry of Finance Institution list. By December 2021, the bank's paid-up capital increased to RM 1.4 billion.

== Corporate affairs ==
The first CEO of the bank is Dato Sim Kheng Boon. Deputy state financial secretary Datu Laura Lee Ngien Hion is appointed into the board of directors. DBOS receives deposits from government-linked companies, local authorities, statutory bodies, and the public sector. The bank carry out lending activities and allows the depositors to withdraw money anytime. The bank carries out lending activities to strategic projects in Sarawak such as public infrastructure development, downstream processing in oil and gas sector, tourism, digital initiatives, real estates, agriculture, and green projects.

=== Finance ===
As of 31 March 2022, DBOS received RM 7.16 billion in deposits. As of November 2022, total approved loans of DBOS was RM 15.27 billion with drawdown (actual amount of credit paid out to borrowers) of RM 8.93 billion.

== See also ==
- List of national development banks
