= Petroleum Sarawak =

Malaysian oil and gas explorer company

Petroleum Sarawak Berhad
- Type: State-owned enterprise
- Industry: Oil and gas
- Founded: 7 August 2017; 9 years ago
- Founder: Abang Johari Openg
- Headquarters: Kuching, Sarawak
- Area served: Sarawak
- Key people: Tan Sri Datuk Amar Hamid Bugo, Chairman; Dato Janin Girie, Group CEO
- Products: Petroleum; Natural gas
- Revenue: ▲RM 138.7 billion (FY 2025)
- Owner: Government of Sarawak
- Subsidiaries: PetrosNiaga Sdn Bhd; Petroleum Sarawak Exploration and Production Bhd; Petroleum Sarawak Gas Sdn Bhd; Sarawak Gas Distribution Sdn Bhd
- Website: www.petroleumsarawak.com

Petroleum Sarawak Berhad (also known as PETROS) is a state-owned oil and gas exploration firm established and wholly owned by the Government of Sarawak.

== Background ==
Sarawak's and Sabah's oil and gas rights were lost to the Federal Government after the 13 May Incident. When the Federal Government made a Proclamation of Emergency in response to the unrest, it unilaterally limited the territorial waters of the Borneo states to three nautical miles. The ownership of the remaining territorial waters were transferred to the Federal Government. In 1974, the Federal Government transferred its territorial waters ownership to Petroliam Nasional Berhad (PETRONAS) through the enactment of the Petroleum Development Act 1974. The then chief minister of Sarawak, Abdul Rahman Ya'kub was one of the signatories of this agreement. Among others, the act allowed PETRONAS to regulate the oil and gas industry in Malaysia, and explore mineral resources in both the states. Petronas also gained control over the oil and gas reserves in Sarawak. The revenues from oil and gas will be divided among oil-producing states (5 percent), federal government (5 percent), producer company (41 percent), and Petronas (49 percent).

In 2011, the 1969 Proclamation of Emergency (along with the 1966 & 1977 Proclamations of Emergency) proclamation was lifted which nullified Emergency Ordinances and measures authorised by these proclamations, including the three nautical miles limitation. The Territorial Sea Act 2012 was introduced to limit the territorial waters to three nautical miles limit through an Act of Parliament. Zainnal Ajamain, a political analyst, claimed that the payment of oil royalty to Sarawak is limited to 10 percent according to the Federal Constitution. However, it was argued that the article stipulated in the Federal Constitution only deals with the eligibility of the state of charging duty exports if the state oil royalty is less than 10 percent.

In 2008, the federal government of Malaysia announced that it had no plans of revising oil royalty rates for Sabah and Sarawak. In 2012, chief minister of Sarawak Abdul Taib Mahmud started a private negotiation with federal government regarding the Sarawak oil royalty. In 2014, Sarawak State Legislative Assembly passed a motion to ask for 20% oil royalty from the federal government. Since then, subsequent chief ministers of Sarawak had been trying to gain more autonomy for oil and gas rights in Sarawak. In May 2015, Petronas agreed to supply cheaper natural gas to Sarawak Energy for power generation. In December 2015, Sarawak state assembly passed another motion that rejects the 2012 Territorial Sea Act; because according to Article 2 of the Constitution of Malaysia, the federal government of Malaysia has no rights to change the state boundaries without the consent of the respective state governments.

In August 2016, following a retrenchment exercise by Petronas on Sarawakian workers, the Sarawak chief minister Adenan Satem had threatened to freeze the work permits of non-Sarawakians Petronas workers in the state. However, soon after that, the issue was resolved after Petronas agreed to offer more jobs for the Sarawak people. As of May 2017, Sarawak was still negotiating with Petronas for an increase in oil and petroleum royalty to 20%.

== History ==
In June 2017, the Chief Minister of Sarawak, Abang Johari Openg, announced that Sarawak will establish a state-owned oil and gas exploration company. On 4 July 2017, Abang Johari announced that the petroleum company would be 100 percent owned by Sarawak and will work with Petronas on an equal basis. It was eventually formed on 7 August 2017. The Sarawak government aimed to have Petros in operation by the first quarter of 2018 and become an active player in the oil & gas industry by 2020. Sarawak government then sent a legal team to the United Kingdom to search for additional supporting documents regarding the rights of Sarawak in the Malaysian agreement. Among them are Sarawak (Alteration of Boundaries) Order 1954 by the Queen in Council, which stated that Sarawak boundary covers way beyond the three nautical miles. In November 2017, Sarawak has formed a special task force to negotiate with Petronas regarding the return of Sarawak oil and gas rights. Sarawak was unwilling to resort to court action to nullify the Territorial Sea Act and Petronas dominance on Sarawak waters so as to preserve the good relationship between the federal and state government.

In February 2018, Abang Johari questioned the validity of the 1974 Petroleum Development Act. This was because the Act was passed during the Emergency Proclamation period from 1969 to 2011. The Emergency Proclamation was abolished in 2011. This raises questions that whether the Petroleum Development Act would cease to become effective after 2011. He also stated that the Petroleum Development Act does not exclude laws such as Sarawak Oil Mining Ordinance 1958 which stated that only Sarawak has the right to issue mining licenses for oil production. In April 2018, the chief minister also announced that under Oil Mining Ordinance 1958 and Gas Distribution Ordinance 2016, Petronas would need to apply mining license from Petros to operate in Sarawak waters by 1 July 2018. Abang Johari also claimed that under the Item 2(c) of the State List, Ninth Schedule of the Federal Constitution, Petros is able to exercise its rights on Sarawak waters. Petronas had welcomed Petros into the oil and gas mining scene as long as Petros acted within the framework of Malaysian Petroleum Development Act, 1974. However, the opposition politicians in Sarawak cast doubts on whether Sarawak has truly regained its oil and gas rights without making any amendments to the existing laws in the country. In April 2018, the Pakatan Harapan opposition coalition in Sarawak offered a 20% oil royalty deal for Sarawak government if the former wins the federal power in 2018 Malaysian general election, however, Sarawak refused to sign it because it has no legal standing. The Sarawak Pakatan Harapan also proposed the setting up of "Sarawak Petrogas" to jointly manage oil and gas resources together with Petronas; while claiming that Petros is only a "subcontractor in logistics" and failed to perform its duty as an oil and gas company.

After 2018 Malaysian general election, Malaysian federal government changed hands to Pakatan Harapan. On 22 May 2018, Petronas responded to Sarawak state attorney-general that it disagrees that Petronas need to apply license from Petros to operate in Sarawak waters. On 4 June 2018, Petronas filed a suit in the Federal Court of Malaysia in order to assert its position as the exclusive owner of Malaysian oil resources (including Sarawak) and the 1974 Petroleum Development Act is still valid. On 22 June 2018, the federal court of Malaysia denied Petronas application to start legal proceedings against Sarawak because the case is not within the jurisdiction of the federal court. On 10 July 2018, Sarawak state assembly passed the Oil Mining (Amendment) Bill (2018) in order to regulate oil and gas activities in the state. All oil and gas companies operating in Sarawak waters would be given grace period until the end of 2019 to comply with Oil Mining Ordinance (OMO) 1958.

Since 1 January 2019, Sarawak enforced 5% sales on all petroleum products. Initially, Petronas was given dateline until end of October 2019 to pay the sales tax. In September 2019, prime minister Mahathir stated that payment of 20% oil royalty is not possible for Sabah and Sarawak because it may compromise financial status of Petronas. On 21 November 2019, the Sarawak government filed a suit against Petronas for not paying the 5% sales tax. In March 2020, high court ruled that Sarawak has the power to impose sales tax on Petronas. On 8 May 2020, Petronas agreed to pay RM 2 billion in petroleum products sales tax to Sarawak with a condition that the tax will be lowered on a staggered basis in the future. Besides, both parties also agreed that the Petroleum Development Act 1974 is valid with Petronas as the sole regulator of oil and gas industry in Malaysia. Wan Zulkiflee, chief executive of Petronas quit his post in June 2020, apparently dissatisfied with the outcome of the sales tax issue.

In February 2020, Sarawak claimed to take full control of natural gas supply, sales, and distribution network in the state from Petronas. While Sarawak was finalising the takover of gas distribution rights from Petronas in 2024, former Petronas chairman Tengku Razaleigh Hamzah and an unnamed analyst stated that Petros would have difficulty to replicate Petronas' ability to negotiate a good deal when dealing with multinational corporations, which in the end would be detrimental to earnings and investments in Sarawak and Malaysia as a whole. Disputes remained whether Sarawak is to become the sole gas aggregator in the state as Petros being the sole gas aggregator would effectively control the supply and pricing of gas distribution in the state, thus squeezing the profit margin of Petronas. In October 2025, Petronas began a legal proceeding in Kuching High Court to challenge the status of Petros as the sole gas aggregator in the state. On 10 January 2026, Petronas filed a review in the federal court which seeks to clarify its legal position within the framework of the federal law of Petroleum Development Act 1974 (PDA) and the state law of the Distribution of Gas Ordinance 2016 (DGO). On 23 February 2026, the Sarawak government filed a petition in the federal court to the determine the constitutional validity and applicability of the Petroleum Development Act 1974, the Continental Shelf Act 1966 and the Petroleum Mining Act 1966 to the state of Sarawak.

In 2023, Petronas found six new oil wells at Balingian and West Luconia geological provinces. The government of Sarawak expressed the desire to collaborate with Petronas on the exploitation of new oil wells as the Sarawak state has ownership rights on the new oil wells as far as 200 nautical miles off the coast as stipulated in the Oil Mining Ordinance 1958.

== Corporate affairs ==
=== Board of directors ===
On 24 August 2017, the Chief Minister's Office announced the five members of the inaugural Board of Directors:-

1. Tan Sri Datuk Amar Hamid Bugo (chairperson) - Former Sarawak State Secretary;
2. Dato Sri Dr. Haji Wan Lizozman bin Haji Wan Omar - member of the Boards of Sarawak Economic Development Sarawak (SEDC) and Sarawak Timber Industry Development Corporation (STIDC).
3. Datu Ir. Haji Zuraimi bin Haji Sabki - Board member of Brooke Dockyard, the Board of Engineers Malaysia, Sarawak Land Custody and Development Authority, Miri Port Authority, Tanjong Manis Port Authority, Bintulu Development Authority and the Sarawak Rivers Board amongst others.
4. Datuk Haji Sharbini bin Suhaili - chief executive officer of Sarawak Energy Berhad (SEB), who was the Vice President (Health, Safety, and Environment) of PETRONAS before joining SEB;
5. YBhg Dato Mohammad Medan Abdullah- chief executive officer of Bintulu Port Holdings Bhd, who is also chairperson with several companies including Petronas Hartabina Sdn Bhd and Petrosains Sdn Bhd;
6. Dato Heng Heyok Chiang @ Heng Hock Cheng - former managing director of Shell Gas & Power Malaysia before his retirement in 2006; and
7. Datin Josephine anak Hilary Dom @ Josephine John
8. Dato Sri Dr. Muhammad Abdullah bin Zaidel - member of the Boards of Sarawak Economic Development Corporation (SEDC), the Sarawak Land Custody & Development Authority and the Federal Government’s National Wages Consultative Council.

On 21 September 2017 PETROS launched an advertisement to hire a new Chief Executive Officer (CEO) for itself, after announcing earlier that month that they wanted to hire a local CEO. PETROS' chairperson announced that the oil & gas company received over 40 applications from Sarawakians to fill the vacancy. As at 17 January 2018, the position is yet to be filled. On 8 March 2018, Chief Minister Abang Johari announced that Sauu Kakok will be appointed as PETROS' first CEO. This followed months of speculation and search.

By 8 November 2017, advertisements to hire human resource manager (HRM), chief operating officer (COO) and chief financial officer (CFO) started appearing on job boards.

== Business ==
=== Upstream ===
In October 2020, the Sarawak government issued mining leases in Miri and Marudi to Petros for onshore oil and gas mining.

In December 2022, Petros collaborate with South Korea's Posco Group on the development of carbon capture and storage (CCS) business.

In January 2023, Petros won oil exploration rights from Petronas in Baram Junior Cluster within the Baram Delta Province offshore Sarawak.

In 2026, PETROS started onshore oil production at Adong Kechil West field near Marudi, with a production rate of 800 barrels per day.

=== Downstream ===
In January 2018, PETROS signed a memorandum of understanding (MOU) with Petrotel Energy Oman LLC to "explore the possibility of co-operation to develop the downstream sector of oil and gas industries in Sarawak”.

In year 2020, Petros started to distribute liquefied petroleum gas (LPG) to 1,500 business and 2,500 households in Miri and Bintulu. In December 2020, Petros launched its own brand of LPG gas cylinder.

In March 2022, Petronas Dagangan Berhad (a subsidiary of Petronas) sold its LPG business to PetrosNiaga Sdn Bhd (a subsidiary of Petros) in exchange of 49% stake in PetrosNiaga.

== See also ==
- Sarawak
- Government of Sarawak
- Premier of Sarawak
- Kuching City F.C.
