= Century Santubong Beach Resort =

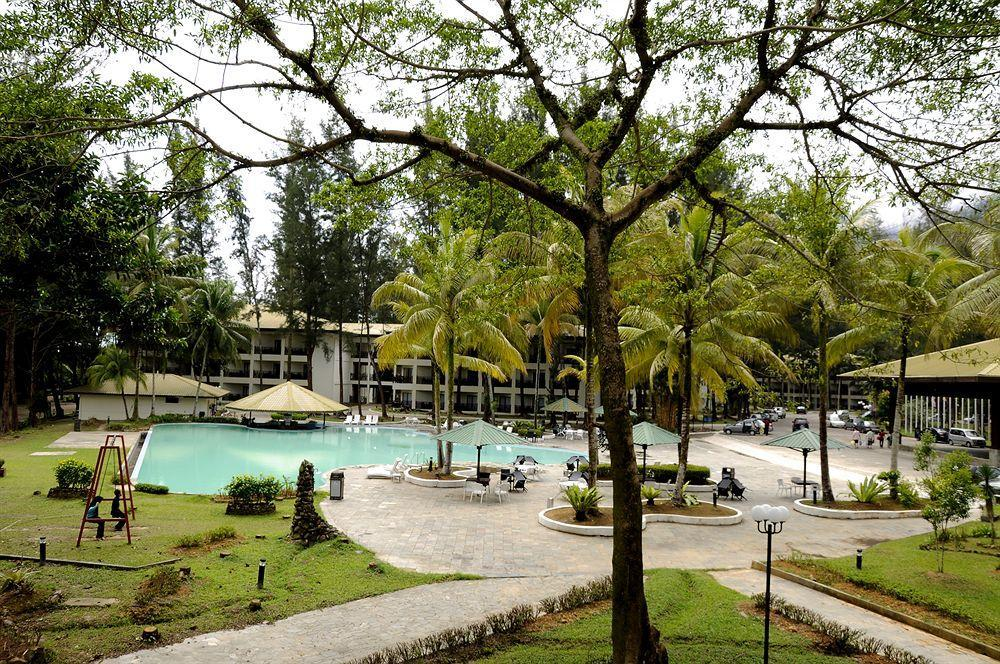
- One Hotel Santubong Kuching Resort inner area, consisted of main hall, swimming pool and hotels (2010).
- Interactive map of the Century Santubong Beach Resort area

General information
- Status: Completed
- Type: Hotel
- Location: Jalan Santubong, Pantai Damai, Kuching 93050, Sarawak, Malaysia
- Coordinates: 1.7397279°N 110.3057921°E
- Opening: 31 August 1993; 32 years ago
- Closed: Late 2010s
- Owner: Santubong (Kuching) Resort Sdn. Bhd. (1993-2009); One Hotel Santubong Sdn. Bhd. (2010-2015); Century Four Points Sdn. Bhd. (2016-late 2010s)

Other information
- Number of rooms: 370
- Public transit: DM9A Damai Golf Course (to be completed)

Century Santubong Beach Resort (formerly Santubong Kuching Resort and One Hotel Santubong Kuching Resort) was a seaside resort located in Santubong, Sarawak, Malaysia. The property was founded by Santubong (Kuching) Resort Sdn. Bhd. and began operations on 31 August 1993, approximately six years after the completion of the Santubong Bridge in 1987, which contributed to the growth of tourism in the area alongside Damai Beach Resort.

Santubong Kuching Resort was officiated by Malaysia's forth and seventh former prime minister, Mahathir Mohamad. It was established as a three-star hotel offering five-star service standards, with the aim of encouraging domestic tourism and attracting international visitors.

The property was taken over by One Hotel Santubong Sdn. Bhd. during 2010. In 2012, a proposal for a 6km cable car development in the resort area, known as the Santubong Beach and Resort City project, was made by Tan Sri Ting Pek Khiing. The project was led by One Cable Car (Santubong) Development Sdn. Bhd. and supported by foreign investors from China and Europe, with the aim of boosting tourism between Santubong and Pasir Pandak. Modelled after the cable car system in Langkawi, the project was estimated to require an investment of RM2.5 billion and was expected to take between five and ten years to complete. Although land clearing had begun since 5 October 2012, issues such as irresponsible land clearing, concerns over inadequate Environmental Impact Assessment (EIA) reports, opposition from environmentalists, and the death of Tan Sri Ting Pek Khiing on 16 October 2020 ultimately caused the project to be shelved.

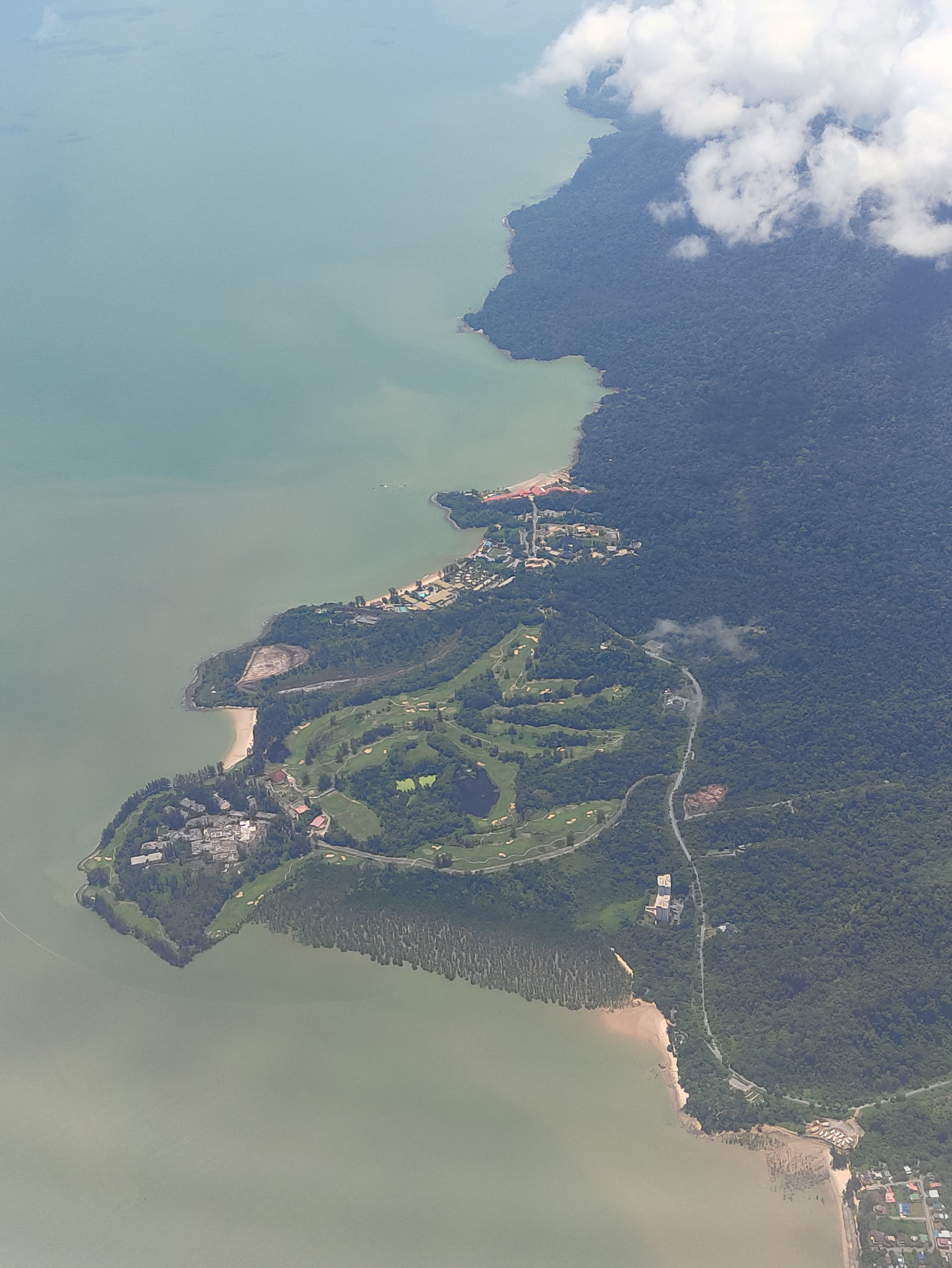
Coastline of Damai Beach Resort (above), Damai Golf & Country Club (middle) and Century Santubong Beach Resort (below).

Before 2016, the resort's architecture incorporated traditional Borneo-inspired design elements. Following its acquisition by Century Four Points Sdn. Bhd., the property was rebranded as Century Santubong Beach Resort and underwent renovations that introduced a more modern appearance.

In the late 2010s, the resort ceased operations, reportedly due to management issues, leading to its quiet closure.
