= Downstream (manufacturing) =

Term in manufacturing

Downstream, in manufacturing, refers to processes which occur later on in a production sequence or production line.

Viewing a company "from order to cash" might have high-level processes such as marketing, sales, order entry, manufacturing, packaging, shipping, and invoicing. Each of these could be deconstructed into many sub-processes and supporting processes.

The manufacturing process consists of such sub-processes as design, tooling, inventory management, receiving, assembly, and so on. The products being manufactured are created in a sequence of processes: any process occurring after another is considered to be "downstream".

== See also ==
- Agile manufacturing
- Lean manufacturing
- Vertical integration
