= Lundu, Sarawak =

Town and district capital in Sarawak, Malaysia

Lundu
- Town and district capital
- Landmark of Lundu town

- Seal

- Location within Malaysia
- Coordinates: 1°40′0″N 109°50′0″E
- Country: Malaysia
- State: Sarawak
- Division: Kuching
- District: Lundu

Government
  - Type: Local government (Lundu District Council)
  - District Officer: Zulkarnain Ismail
  - Council Secretary: Hajah Norashikin binti Brahim

Area
  - Total: 1,962.2 km^{2} (757.6 sq mi)

Population (2025)
  - Total: 46,187
  - Density: 23.538/km^{2} (60.964/sq mi)
- Time zone: UTC+8 (MST)
  - Summer (DST): Not observed
- Area code(s): +6082 (Landline) +6011 & +6012 (Phone)
- Website: lundudc.sarawak.gov.my

Lundu is a town and the capital of Lundu District located in the northwest of Kuching Division of Sarawak, Malaysia, and borders the Indonesian Province of West Kalimantan. This town also located 78 kilometres from Batu Kawah (Kuching) and at around 57 kilometres from Bau.

== History ==
Lundu is a district located in the Northwest of Kuching Division of Sarawak, Malaysia, and borders with Indonesian Province of West Kalimantan. Once upon a time, Lundu was a strategic area in the waters of Tanjung Datu that has been known for centuries in history, including in the history of Majapahit, China and Srivijaya. This was realized by the British colonialists when Lundu was later made the first stronghold.

As far as anyone knows, the lands around Lundu was empty of people until relatively recently. Although the main river is called Batang Kayan, "the Kayan river," there is no evidence at all that any Kayan people ever lived there. In the middle of the eighteenth century a group of Bidayuh people from near Bau migrated and settled on the west bank of the Batang Kayan, where Kampong Stunggang Melayu now stands. They came to be called the Dayak Lundu, and though the last member of the tribe died in the 1960s, you can still see the grove of durian trees they planted.

The name "Lundu" itself is taken from a small catfish that abounds in the Sungai Lundu which flows down from Gunung Gading. There are also local sources said that Lundu name comes from community groups known as the Undu, but when mixing marriage with Malay, Bidayuh and Iban this community has group into Malay, Bidayuh and Iban. Undu is actually a variation of the name Undi or Datu Undi or known as Raja Jarom who comes from Minangkabau, Sumatra. Datu Undi or Undu has seven children. His children became the government in Saribas, Samarahan, Kalaka, Sadong. His children are very famous such as Dato Terawoh in Kota Samarahan and Datu Godam (Saribas) who use the title of Abang.

Towards the close of the eighteenth century three groups of people at the same time came separately to make their homes in Lundu. From the east came the Ibans. These Ibans were originally from Balau on the west bank of the Batang Lupar. As the Iban were coming to Lundu from the east, Chinese and Selako settlers were arriving from the west, over the hills that separate Sarawak from what is now Indonesian Borneo. Chinese had been living in Pontianak and Sambas for a hundred years or more. When gold was discovered in Bau, Chinese migrated there. Also from the west came the Selako or Selakau. Malays also came to settle from the Natuna Islands.

What is wonderful about Lundu, is that although four different people settled very close together, there has from the beginning never been any friction between them. They seek a better life, and each people pursued their aim in a way that did not compete with the others. Lundu had electricity and piped water (from Gunung Gading) by the early 1960s. The Lundu hospital was built in 1965, and now offers treatment for all except the most serious problems. They have a dental clinic and ultrasound screening for mothers-to-be. Until 1968, Lundu could be reached from Kuching only by boat. The road from Bau to Lundu was completed in that year and regular bus service began.

== 1972 Lundu incident ==
Lundu ambush
- Part of the Communist insurgency in Sarawak
Date	26 March 1972
Location	Lundu, Sarawak, Malaysia
Result	Malaysian victory ● Insurgents withdrawal

Belligerents
Malaysia	NKCP

Commanders and leaders
Corporal Jamaluddin (commander of the Malaysian forces)	Unknown

Strength
7th Royal Ranger Regiment	40 Insurgents

Casualties and losses
15 killed 1 truck destroyed	many

On 26 March 1972, The North Kalimantan Communist Party (NKCP) ambushed a convoy of the 7th Royal Ranger Regiment in Lundu, Sarawak, killing 15 soldiers. The convoy, consisting of engineer troops and support personnel, was attacked by 30 to 40 insurgents. The engineers in the first vehicles passed through unharmed, but the third truck was targeted.

The engineers, outnumbered, sped to Titi Akar for reinforcements. Corporal Jamaluddin quickly arrived with a Ferret armoured vehicle and opened fire, causing the insurgents to retreat.In response, the 7th Royal Ranger Regiment launched a large-scale operation, killing several insurgents and seizing weapons.

Lundu is currently under constant development, with more and more public infrastructures and other being built and proposed.

== Politics ==
In state and federal Constituencies, Lundu area is represented by Gabungan Parti Sarawak (GPS):

- Y.B. Azizul Annuar Adenan of PBB - Member of Sarawak State Legislative Council for N3 Tanjung Datu.
- Y.B. Dato' Sri Nancy Shukri of PBB - Member of Parliament of Malaysia for P193 Santubong.
- Y.B. Mordi anak Bimol of DAP - Member of Parliament of Malaysia for P192 Mas Gading.

== Local government ==
Lundu District Office is the nerve center of the administration of the District. The first district officer was appointed in 1877 and the current district officer is the 44th. The district officer has wide statutory powers, to enable him to function effectively. The district officer is also chairman of the Lundu District Council.

Lundu District Council provides municipal services for Lundu District. The secretary to the Lundu District Council is the CEO. The early history of the Lundu District Council is just like other councils in Sarawak which was in 1953, chaired by D.L Bruen (1953-1956), which was then known as Lundu District Authority. On 1 April 1957, the Lundu District Local Authority was re-established and known as Lundu District Council until the restructuring of Local Councils in 1981 till today to handle the management and administrative duties of the Lundu District.

The Lundu District Council Office is located at the Batang Kayan Road, near the town of Lundu, opposite the Batang Kayan river. There are 32 council members including Chairman and Deputy Chairman appointed as Council Member by His Excellency's Speaker of the State of Sarawak to perform all the obligations entrusted to the people.

== Demographics ==
As of 2025, Lundu has a population of 46,187 people.

Ethnic groups in Lundu, Sarawak (2025)
Ethnics	Percent
Malays	32.3%
Chinese	15%
Iban	7.3%
Bidayuh	37%
Orang Ulu	2.1%
Melanau	5.7%
Indian	0.4%
Non-citizens	0.2%

== Transportation ==
=== Local Bus ===
Route No.	Operating Route	Operator	Remark
K26	Kuching-Bau-Lundu-Sematan	CPL	

Lundu is located 100 km from Kuching City, 70 km from Bau Town, 28 km from Sematan Bazzar, 26 km from Biawak Bazzar, 18 km from Kampong Sebako and 10 km from Pandan Beach. It is accessible by road. In the mid- to late-2000s, Batang Kayan Bridge was officially opened to traffic, ending the ferry services to and from Lundu through Batang Kayan. Lundu was previously connected by air, and there are remains of the former airstrip in Lundu. Part of the runway of the old airstrip is now used as a road.

Biawak which is near the Indonesia-Malaysia border is the location of one of three land border crossings into Indonesia. The Malaysian checkpoint is called the Biawak Immigration, Customs, Quarantine and Security Checkpoint while the Indonesian checkpoint is called the Aruk Border Crossing Checkpoint. The nearest towns to Aruk are Sambas town about 93m away, and Singkawang about 160 km away. Both towns are in West Kalimantan.

== Education ==
Centre for Technology Excellence Sarawak (CENTEXS) set up a hospitality and tourism academy in Lundu in December 2022 to upskill and reskill school leavers, industry employees, and university graduates.

=== Primary schools ===
- SK Raso
- SK Bokah
- SK Stungkor
- SK Selampit
- SK Sampadi
- SK Siar Campuran
- SK Lebai Mentali
- SK Biawak
- SK Hollyname
- SK Bumiputra
- SK Sebiris
- SK Serayan/Keranji
- SK Paon
- SK Sebako
- SK Sebat
- SK Pueh
- SK Sematan
- SK Telok Melano/Serabang
- SJK (C) Chung Hua Serayan/Selarat
- SJK (C) Chung Hua Sematan
- SJK (C) Chung Hua Lundu

=== Secondary schools ===
- SMK Lundu
- SMK Sematan
- SMK Senibong

== Climate ==
Lundu has a tropical rainforest climate (Af) with heavy to very heavy rainfall year-round and with extremely heavy rainfall in January and February.

Climate data for Lundu
Month	Jan	Feb	Mar	Apr	May	Jun	Jul	Aug	Sep	Oct	Nov	Dec	Year
Mean daily maximum °C (°F)	29.3 (84.7)	29.6 (85.3)	30.6 (87.1)	31.5 (88.7)	31.9 (89.4)	31.6 (88.9)	31.6 (88.9)	31.4 (88.5)	31.2 (88.2)	31.2 (88.2)	30.8 (87.4)	30.2 (86.4)	30.9 (87.6)
Daily mean °C (°F)	25.8 (78.4)	26.0 (78.8)	26.6 (79.9)	27.2 (81.0)	27.4 (81.3)	27.2 (81.0)	27.0 (80.6)	26.9 (80.4)	26.8 (80.2)	26.9 (80.4)	26.6 (79.9)	26.3 (79.3)	26.7 (80.1)
Mean daily minimum °C (°F)	22.4 (72.3)	22.5 (72.5)	22.6 (72.7)	22.9 (73.2)	23.0 (73.4)	22.8 (73.0)	22.5 (72.5)	22.5 (72.5)	22.5 (72.5)	22.7 (72.9)	22.5 (72.5)	22.5 (72.5)	22.6 (72.7)
Average rainfall mm (inches)	690 (27.2)	718 (28.3)	438 (17.2)	211 (8.3)	179 (7.0)	128 (5.0)	139 (5.5)	178 (7.0)	165 (6.5)	232 (9.1)	286 (11.3)	497 (19.6)	3,861 (152)
Source: Climate-Data.org

== Economic activities ==
- Agriculture – Mostly cocoa, black pepper, paddy, fruits, vegetables, and palm oil.
- Aquaculture – Fish (sea bass hatchery), prawns (tiger prawns) and crab (flower and mud crabs)
- Poultry sector – Chickens, ducks, goose, and turkeys.
- Fishing activities.
- Tourism sector – Homestay programs and travel campaigns.
- Hospitality – Many hotels and resorts are ready to be available in Lundu and Sematan, such as ROXY Sematan Hotel, ROXY Beach Resort, and the upcoming two new projects (Raffles Lundu Resort & Spa and St. Regis Sematan Resort).
- Various commercial business – Supermarkets (Ninso, Jun Rong, MR. DIY, Everwin, and Unaco), shophouses, banking services (Maybank, BSN, CIMB, and Affin Bank), restaurants, cafes, food court, and mini markets.
- Sport facilities – Badminton courts, football fields, basketball courts, and a new athletic sports complex.
- Government services – Police station, fire station, post office, library, community center, technical & vocational college (CENTEXS Lundu), and schools.
- Cottage industry – Fish crackers, traditional cakes, and traditional biscuits & chips, supported by Sarawak government agencies such as MINTRED Sarawak, Small and Medium Enterprise Corporation Malaysia (SME Corp), and SALCRA.

== Attractions and recreational spots ==
Siar beach is located to the west of the Lundu town, within Pandan village. Sarawak Land Consolidation & Rehabilitation Authority (SALCRA) Bajo training centre and Union Yes Retreat & Training Centre are located near the Siar beach.

- Tanjung Datu National Park - westernmost tip of Sarawak
- Gunung Gading National Park - home to the Rafflesia
- Pandan Beach
- Pugu Beach
- Sematan Beach - Abang Amin Beach, Sungai Kilong Beach and Pueh Beach
- Samunsam Wildlife Sanctuary
- Sampadi Island
- Rambungan Beach
- Sebako hot spring
- Jangkar Waterfalls
- Osuka Beach
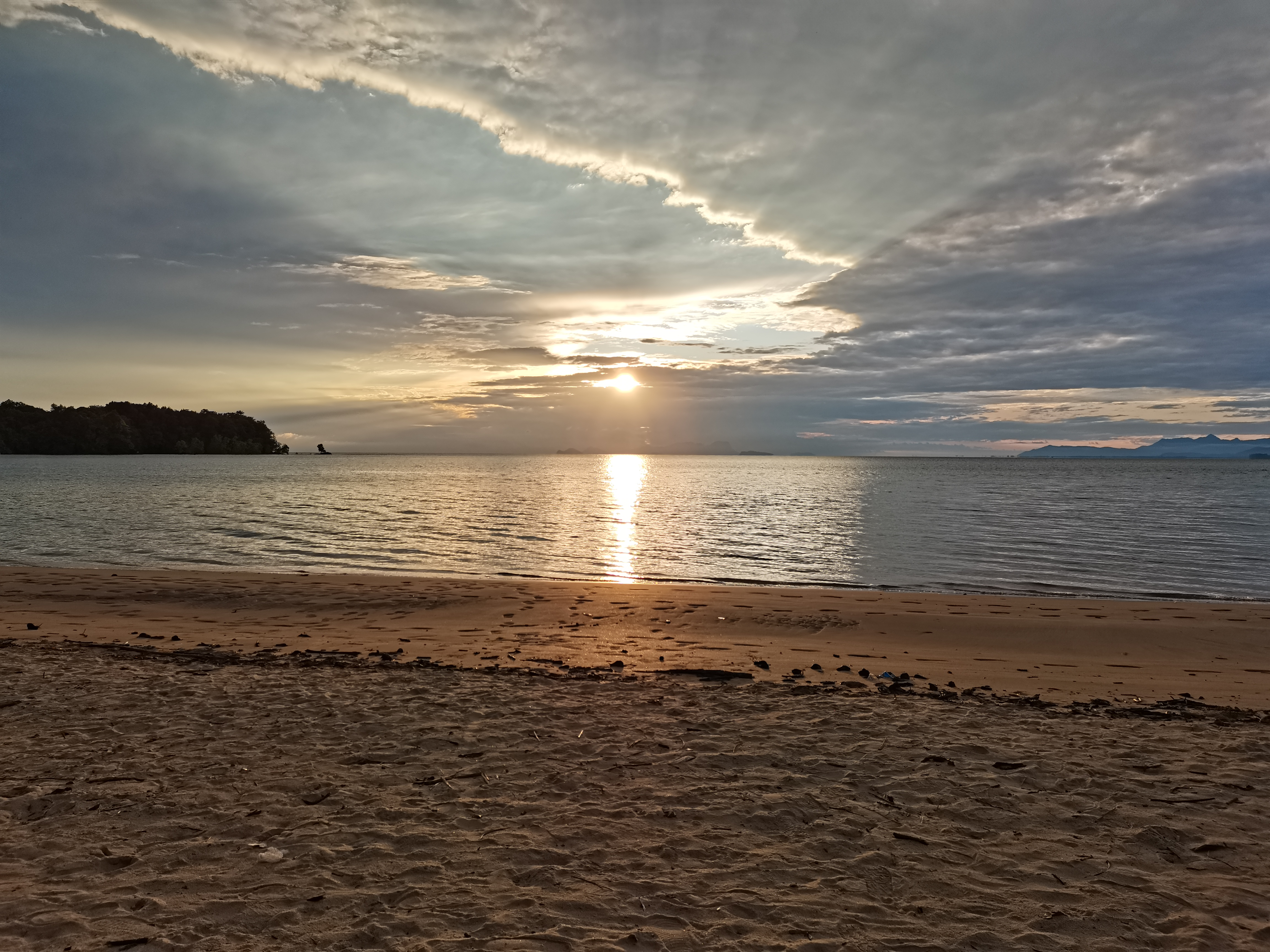
Sunrise over Siar beach.

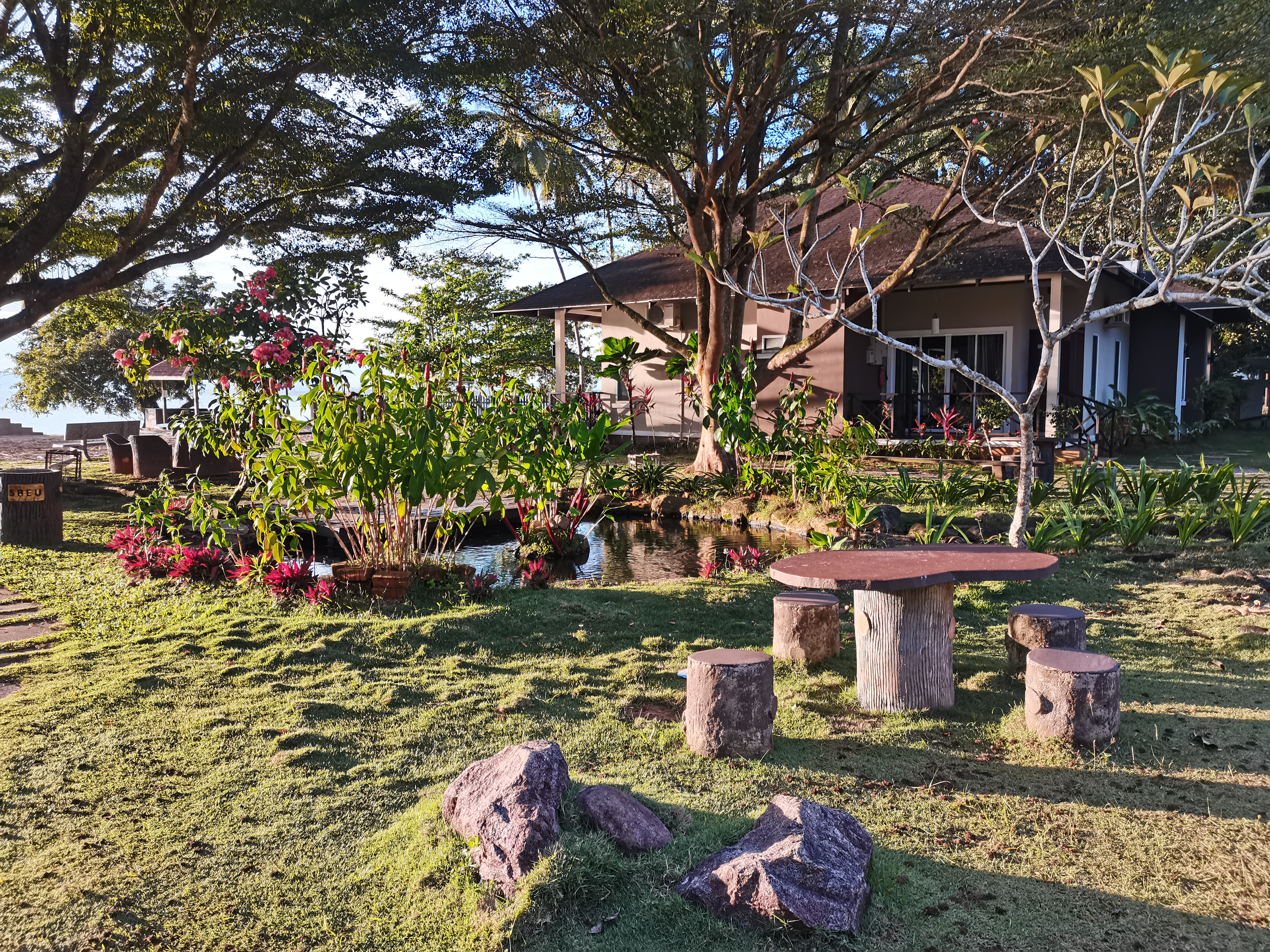
A chalet beside a small artificial lake garden inside Union Yes Retreat & Training Centre.

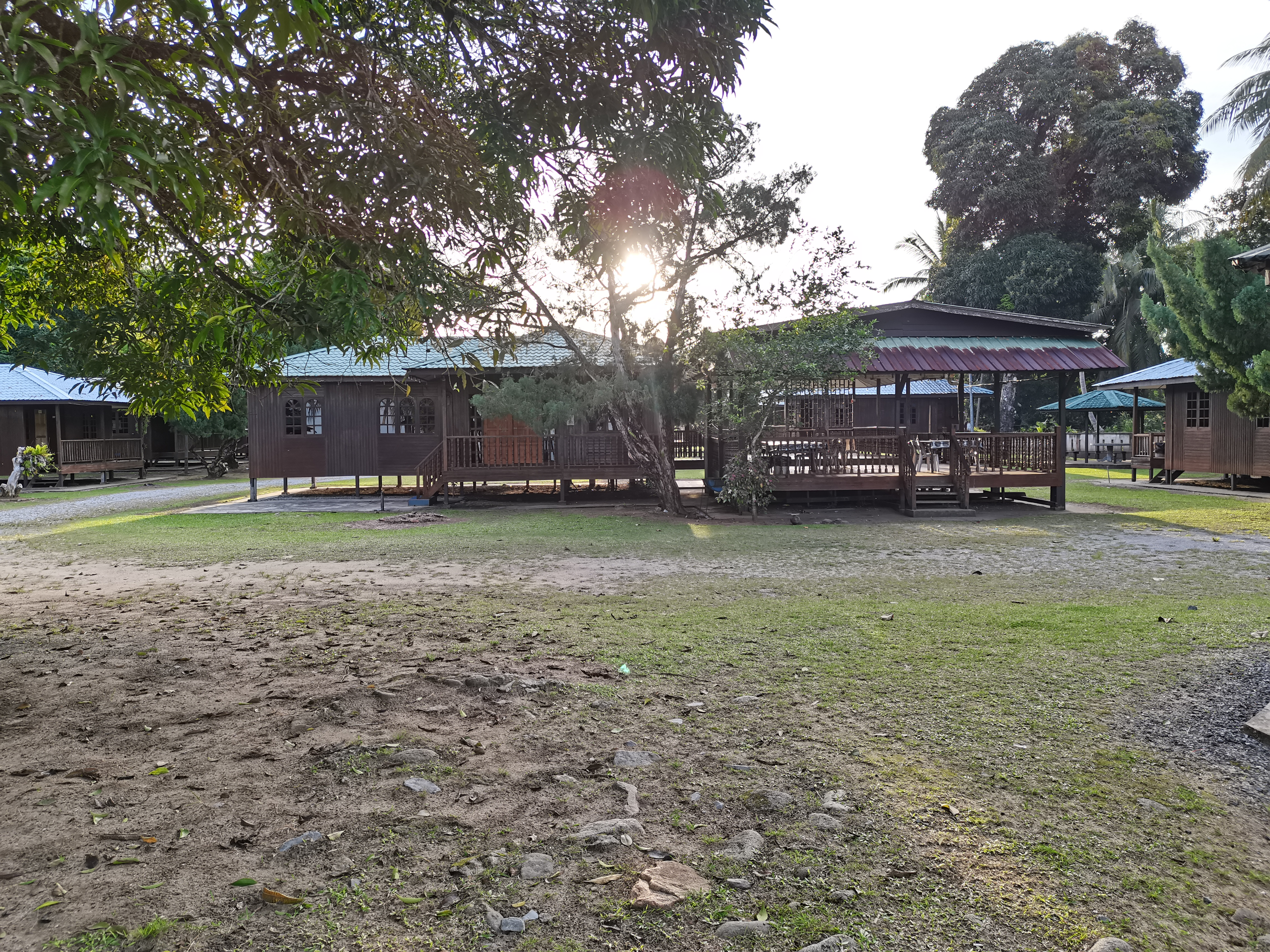
Chalets at Salcra Bajo Training Centre.

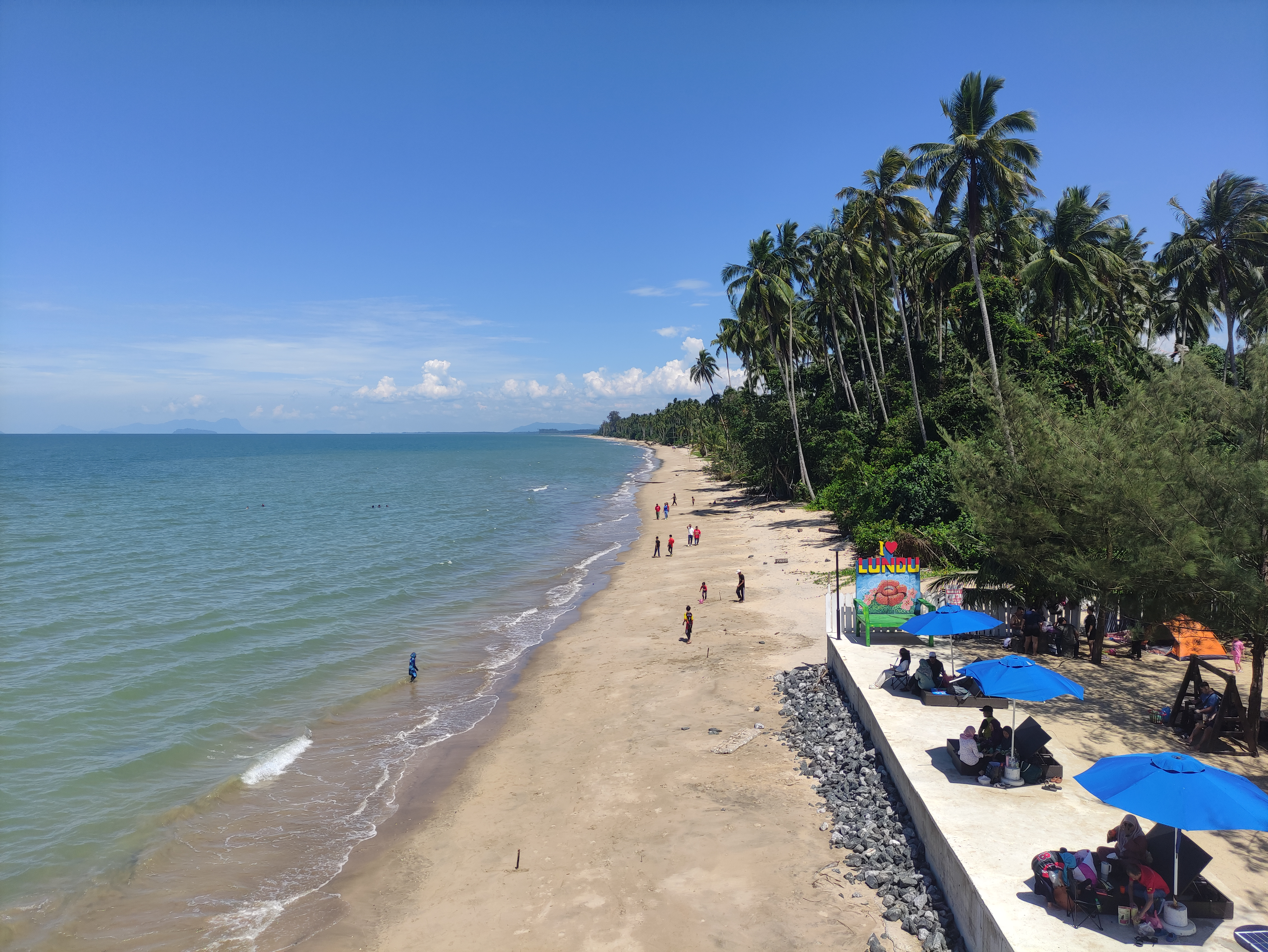
Osuka Beach shoreline
