= A. J. Witono =

Indonesian military officer and diplomat

Antonius Josef Witono Sarsanto
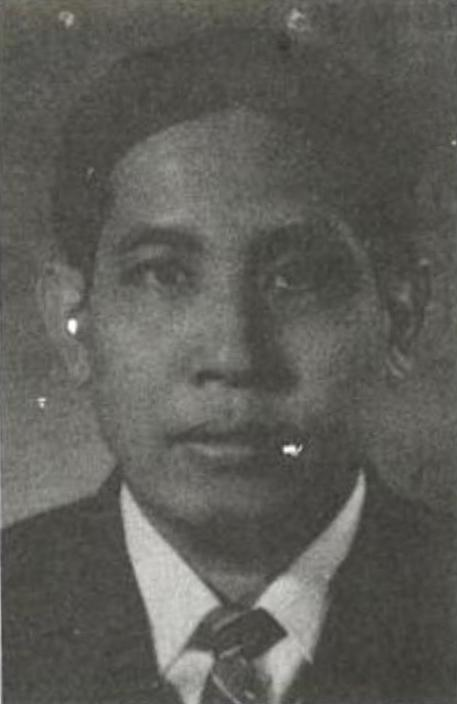

Indonesia Ambassador to Japan
- In office 17 January 1976 – 23 June 1979
- President: Suharto
- Preceded by: Jusuf Ramli
- Succeeded by: Sayidiman Suryohadiprojo

Personal details
- Born: May 10, 1925 Yogyakarta, Yogyakarta Sultanate
- Died: August 25, 1989 (aged 64) Cikini Hospital, Jakarta, Indonesia
- Party: Golkar

Military service
- Allegiance: Indonesia
- Branch/service: Army
- Years of service: 1945–1980
- Rank: Lieutenant General
- Battles/wars: Indonesian National Revolution; Madiun Affair; Darul Islam rebellion; Communist insurgency in Sarawak

Antonius Josef Witono Sarsanto (10 May 1925 – 25 August 1989) was an Indonesian military officer and diplomat who became the Ambassador of Indonesia to Japan.

== Early life ==
Witono was born on 10 May 1925 in Yogyakarta. Witono attended Hollandsch-Inlandsche School (Dutch schools for native) in Blitar, Meer Uitgebreid Lager Onderwijs (More Advanced Primary Education) in Malang, and Hollandsch Inlandsche Kweekschool (Substitute Teachers' School) in Muntilan. After attending the Hollandsche Inlandsche Kweekschool, he initially enrolled at the teacher's school in Blitar in order to become a teacher, but dropped out in 1945 to pursue military career following the independence of Indonesia.

== Military career ==
Witono was assigned as a platoon commander in the A Battalion in Yogyakarta. He was then promoted to become the commander of the 3rd Company in the Nasuhi Battalion. His battalion initially fought to suppress the Madiun Affair and was deployed again to fight against the Darul Islam rebellion in 1948. Witono's company was based at the Sindangbarang village during the battle and became the only battalion to remain organized. Ahmad Nasuhi, the commander of the battalion, instructed Witono's company to take over the line of defense against Darul Islam rebels from Mount Sawal to Rancah. Witono was rotated to Ciamis and became the chief of staff of the region's military resort. He continued to quell the rebellion in his new position.

After the rebellion was fully suppressed in West Java, Witono became the commander of the newly formed 323th White Crocodile Battalion since 15 November 1950. He held the command until 1 September 1952 and held command at the KUKAD unit in Bandung after that. From 1954 until 1960, he held several sections, chief of staff, and commanding offices throughout regiments in West Java until he became the assistant to the chief of staff of the Siliwangi Military Regional Command. Witono ended his tenure as assistant in 1960 and was instructed to attend the Australian Staff College alongside Edward Wellington Pahala Tambunan in 1961 and graduated from the college in 1963. Tambunan and Witono were both commemorated by the Indonesia-Australia Defence Alumni Association with the Sarsono–Tambunan Memorial Lecture Series held in Indonesia and Australia on a quarterly basis.

== Commander of the Sunan Gunung Jati Military Resort ==
In 1963, Witono became the Commander of the Sunan Gunung Jati Military Resort, replacing Saptadji Hadiprawira who was transferred to Kalimantan. Several months after his ascension to the commander's office, Witono disbanded a number of battalions inside his military resort.

Witono oversaw the chaos that ensued after the 30 September Movement occurred in 1965. He also received the detention of the movement's perpetrator Untung Syamsuri, who was arrested by the commander of the Tegal Military Police Captain M. Isa. Although Isa arrested Untung in Central Java, and he himself was based in the province, Isa opted to send him to West Java as Central Java was laden with supporters of the movement. Witono then brought him to Jakarta, where he was sentenced to death for his actions.

Witono was rotated from his command shortly after the arrest to become the Chief of Staff of the Jaya (Jakarta) Military Region on 11 November 1965. During his brief stint, Witono continued to quell the supporters of the 30 September Movement in Jakarta. He was discharged on 17 March 1966 and was made as the Deputy Assistant IV (Logistics) to the Commander of the Army.

== Commander of the Tanjungpura Military Regional Command ==
After holding the office of deputy assistant for a brief period, Witono was made the Commander of the Tanjungpura Military Regional Command, covering the West Kalimantan province, on 29 April 1967. His ascension to Tanjungpura's commander was part of a series of appointment made by Suharto to move anti-Sukarno officers into important commands. According to Jamie Seth Davidson, a professor in political science on Indonesia, Witono was appointed due to his experience with antiguerilla counteroperations and his good reputation with Suharto. He also maintained a longstanding relationship with Iskak Doera, a military chaplain in the region. Witono's main task in this region was to exterminate the communist insurgency in Borneo.

Unlike his pro-Sukarno predecessor, Witono undertook a massive operation to crush the insurgency. Witono claimed in February 1968 that around 5,600 troops from his command were engaging the communist insurgents. Subsequently, Witono also purged his commands from communist infiltrators and arrested thirteen officers accused of cooperating with the insurgents in January 1969. An arms cache, which was alleged to be transferred later by the cooperators, was found in the house of an arrested officer. Witono's arrest was continued with the arrest of 50 other military officers and civilian. His spokesman also claimed that the military regional command had uncovered a network of communist insurgents which involved military officers, local Chinese, and prominent figures.

Following the arrests of the officers and civilians, the influence of the insurgency was largely curbed. On the same month after the arrests were conducted, Witono claimed that there were only 70 members of the original insurgency forces that were still fighting against the Indonesian army. He also remarked that the army were also fighting a new insurgency called the North Kalimantan People's Army (NKPA). He only oversaw the fighting against the NKPA for a brief period, as in March 1969 he was already removed from office.

== Commander of the Siliwangi Military Regional Command ==
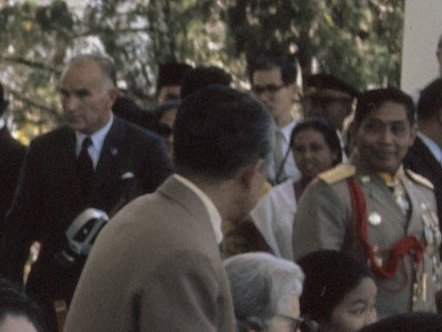
Witono (far right) at an event in West Java, August 1971.

After serving in Kalimantan for three years, Witono was made as the Commander of the Siliwangi (West Java) Military Region on 19 April 1969 and was promoted to the rank of major general in July 1969. Witono's tenure in West Java saw the deterioration of the relationship between university students and army, which culminated in the assassination of Rene Louis Conrad, a Bandung Institute of Technology student, by a police officer. Immediately, students from the institute began demonstrating against the army, and several clashes between students and police cadres occurred at several points in West Java. Instead of attempting to resolve the division, Witono undermined the causes of this clashes, stating that it occurred due to "unrestrained emotions".

In an interview in November 1970, Witono reiterated his anti-Sukarnoist stance, stating that "Sukarnoism could not be tolerated anywhere."

== Commander of the 3rd Regional Defense Command ==
Witono became the Commander of the 3rd Regional Defense Command on 26 September 1972. He ended his term on 7 June 1975.

== Indonesia Ambassador of to Japan ==
Witono became the Ambassador of Indonesia to Japan on 17 January 1976.

== Death ==
Witono died on 25 August 1989 in Cikini Hospital, Jakarta. He had suffered from lung cancer two years prior to his death. He was buried at the Kalibata Heroes' Cemetery with a military ceremony led by Edi Sudradjat, the army chief of staff.

== Personal life ==
Witono married Caecilia Maria Prayuni on 1 January 1957. The couple has eight children.

== Bibliography ==
- Historical Bureau of the Siliwangi Military Regional Command (1979), Siliwangi Dari Masa ke Masa (in Indonesian), Angkasa
- van der Kroef, Justus M. (1970), "Indonesian Communism since the 1965 Coup", Pacific Affairs, 43 (1): 34–60, doi:10.2307/2753833, ISSN 0030-851X, JSTOR 2753833
- Anderson, Benedict R; Kahin, Audrey (April 1983), "Indonesian Army Territorial Commanders 1950 – March 1983", Indonesia, 35: 215 – via eCommons
