= Bawadiman Kartohadiprodjo =

Former regent of Pasuruan

Raden Tumenggung Bawadiman Kartohadiprodjo
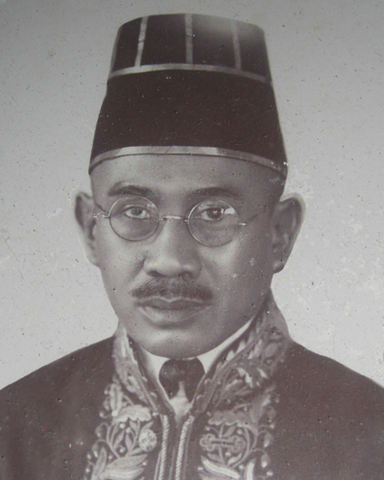

Regent of Pasuruan
- In office 24 March 1932 – 18 October 1933
- Monarch: Wilhelmina
- Governor General: Bonifacius Cornelis de Jonge
- Preceded by: R.M.T. Pandji Darto Soegondho
- Succeeded by: R.A.A. Harsono (acting); R.T. Hoepoedio Siswodiprodjo

Personal details
- Born: Kartohadiprodjo; December 25, 1886 Rembang, Dutch East Indies
- Died: October 18, 1933 (aged 46) Surabaya, East Java, Dutch East Indies
- Spouse: Umi Untari
- Children: 7, including Sayidiman and Soediman

Bawadiman Kartohadiprodjo (25 December 1886 – 18 October 1933) was a Javanese bureaucrat who served as the Regent of Pasuruan and as the deputy speaker of the East Java Council.

== Biography ==
Kartohadiprodjo was born on 25 December 1886 as the son of Mas Bawadiman. Kartohadiprodjo began his career as an assistant clerk at the Regent of Tuban office from 24 December 1904 until 25 May 1906. After that, he was transferred to Jatirogo in Tuban, East Java and worked as a clerk to the Wedana (head of district) of Jatirogo. In 1908, he was promoted from his position as clerk to mantripolitie (a title for indigenous officials).

On 24 May 1911, Kartohadiprodjo was appointed as the Asisten Wedana (head of subdistrict) of Todanan in Blora. He held the office for four years until 16 October 1915, when he became an attorney in Blora's landraad (court for indigenous people). He only served in the landraad for a year, as in 1916 he attended Bestuursschool (school for indigenous civil servants). He graduated from the school two years later, and was posted in Rembang as a Wedana.

Kartohadiprodjo was transferred again in 1920 to the Panolan Village in Cepu. After four years serving in the village, on 29 September 1924, he was transferred again to Bojonegoro and served as the regency's patih (secretary). In addition to his position as secretary, Kartohadiprodjo was appointed as the deputy controleur (Dutch liaison for the indigenous people) of the region in 1926. During his tenure as patih, he was put in charge of supervising the 1930 population census in Bojonegoro. Kartohadiprodjo served as the patih of Bojonegoro until 27 October 1930, when he was posted to Sidoarjo as a patih.

On 24 March 1932, Kartohadiprodjo became the regent of Pasuruan. In accordance to Javanese custom, Kartohadiprodjo was given the noble title of Raden and the official title of Tumenggung. After his promotion to regent, Bawadiman was elected to the East Java Council in 1933 to represent the Perhimpunan Pegawai Bestuur Bumiputra (Association of Indigenous Civil Servants). He served in the Subsidy Commission of the council and became the deputy speaker of the council.

Kartohadiprodjo died at 07.00 on 18 October 1933 in his sleep. Following his death, special elections were held to fill the vacancy in the East Java Council. Raden Dradjat, the patih of Bangil, was elected to replace Kartohadiprojo. The office of the Regent of Pasuruan would remain vacant for another two years until R.A.A. Harsono was appointed to held the office in acting capacity on 1 January 1935.

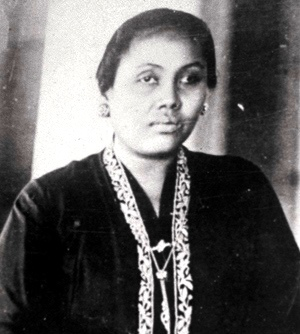
Umi Untari

Kartohadiprodjo was married to Umi Untari. The marriage resulted in seven children, namely Sayidiman, Soediman, Soekarmen, Soelasikin, Soelasbawiati, Soelasbawiatini, and Soelasmiarti.
