= Communist insurgency in Sarawak =

Low-intensity conflict in Sarawak, Malaysia

- Part of Formation of Malaysia, Indonesia–Malaysia confrontation, Communist insurgency in Malaysia (1968–1989) and the Cold War in Asia
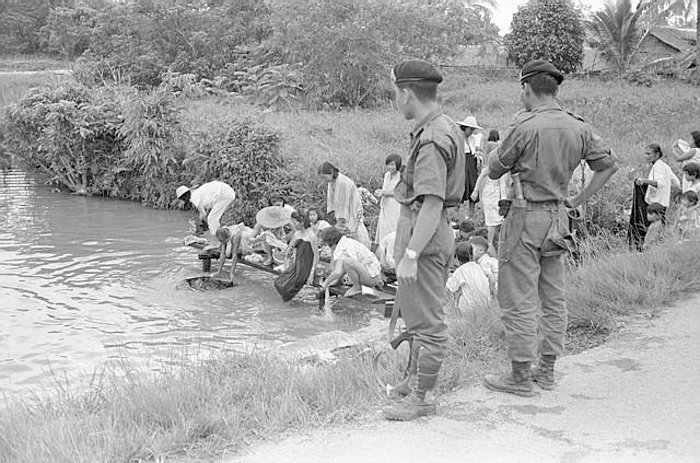
- Armed soldiers guarding a group of Chinese villagers who were taking a communal bath in 1965 to prevent them from collaborating with the Communist guerrillas and to protect the area from Indonesian infiltrators.
Date	22 June 1962 – 3 November 1990
Location	Sarawak, Malaysia
Result	Peace Declaration of Sri Aman in 1973; Dissolution of the Sarawak Communist Organisation/North Kalimantan Communist Party (SCO/NKCP).

Belligerents
Anti-communist forces: United Kingdom: Sarawak (until 1963); Malaysia: Sarawak (after 1963); Supported by: Australia; Brunei; New Zealand; United States Indonesia (after 1965) (Indo-Malay border)	Communist forces: North Kalimantan Communist Party: Sarawak People's Guerrilla Force (SPGF); North Kalimantan People's Army (NKPA); Indonesia (1962–65) (military aid); Other support: Brunei People's Party: North Kalimantan National Army (NKNA); Malayan Communist Party: Malayan Races Liberation Army; Supported by: China; North Vietnam (until 1975); North Korea

Commanders and leaders
Walter Walker (1962–1965); Tunku Abdul Rahman; Abdul Razak Hussein; Hussein Onn; Mahathir Mohamad; Stephen Kalong Ningkan; Tawi Sli; Abdul Rahman Ya'kub; Abdul Taib Mahmud; Othman Ibrahim; Ungku Nazaruddin Suharto (from 1965); A. J. Witono; A. M. Hendropriyono	Wen Ming Chyuan; Lam Wah Kwai; Bong Kee Chok; Ang Cho Teng; Wong Lieng Kui; Yang Chu Chung †; Yap Choon Hau †; Cheung Ah Wah Sukarno (until 1965); A. M. Azahari; Yassin Affandi; Chin Peng

Strength
1,500+ armed police and soldiers 10,000 (1968); 3,000+ Indonesian soldiers	600–1,000+ guerrilla fighters Unknown numbers of Indonesian infiltrators

Casualties and losses
99 killed 144 wounded ≈2,000 Indonesian soldiers killed or wounded (communists claims and approximates by anonymous)	400–763 killed 260 captured 220 surrendered Hundreds Indonesian infiltrators killed
- ≈19 civilians killed
- Statistics source

The communist insurgency in Sarawak was an insurgency in Malaysia from 1962 to 1990, and involved the North Kalimantan Communist Party (NKCP) and the Malaysian Government. It was one of the two communist insurgencies to challenge the former British colony of Malaysia during the Cold War. As with the earlier Malayan Emergency (1948–1960), the communist insurgents in Sarawak were predominantly ethnic Chinese, who opposed British rule over Sarawak and later opposed the merger of the state into the newly created Federation of Malaysia. The insurgency was triggered by the 1962 Brunei revolt, which had been instigated by the left-wing Brunei People's Party in opposition to the proposed formation of Malaysia.

The communist insurgents in Sarawak were also supported by Indonesia until 1965, when the pro-Western president Suharto assumed power in a coup and ended the confrontation with Malaysia. During that period, the NKCP's two main military formations were created: the Sarawak People's Guerrilla Force (SPGF) or Pasukan Gerilya Rakyat Sarawak (PGRS), and the North Kalimantan People's Army (NKPA) or the Pasukan Rakyat Kalimantan Utara (PARAKU). Following the end of the confrontation, Indonesian military forces would co-operate with the Malaysians in counter-insurgency operations against their former allies.

The North Kalimantan Communist Party was formally established in March 1970, through the merger of several Communist and left-wing groups in Sarawak including the Sarawak Liberation League (SLL), the Sarawak Advanced Youths' Association (SAYA), and the NKPA. In response to the insurgency, the Malaysian federal government created several "controlled areas" along the Kuching-Serian road in Sarawak's First and Third Divisions in 1965. In addition, the Sarawak Chief Minister Abdul Rahman Ya'kub also managed to convince many of the NKCP insurgents, to enter into peace negotiations and lay down their arms between 1973 and 1974. Following the successful peace talks between the Malaysian government and the Malayan Communist Party in 1989, the remaining NKCP insurgents signed a peace agreement on 17 October 1990, which formally ended the insurgency.

== History ==
=== Background ===
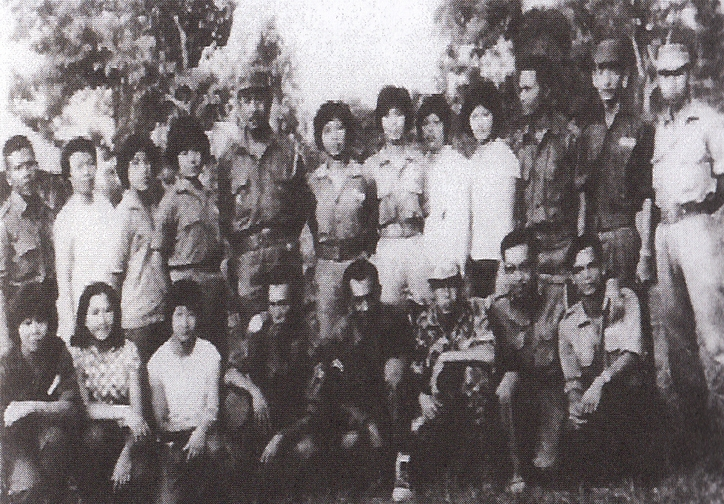
Members of the Sarawak People's Guerrilla Force (SPGF), North Kalimantan National Army (NKNA) and Indonesian National Armed Forces (TNI) taking photograph together marking the close relations between them during Indonesia under the rule of Sukarno.

The roots of communist movements in Sarawak can be traced its back to a loose movement named the "Sarawak Anti-Fascist League" during Japanese occupation of Sarawak.

In the 1940s, Maoism had spread among Chinese vernacular schools in Sarawak. After the establishment of People's Republic of China (PRC) in 1949, the Sarawak leftist newspaper "China Gazette" (中华公报) (established on 1 November 1945) reported on news of the PRC, which inspired the leftist movement in Sarawak. However, on 1 May 1951, the newspaper was banned by the British colonial government. On the other hand, Kuching Overseas Chinese Youth Association (古晋华侨青年社), headquartered at Padungan road, Kuching, promoted the life under PRC, China intervention in Korean War, leftist songs, and entertainment activities. By 1951, Chinese revolutionary reading materials, and books on Marxism–Leninism were secretly smuggled from Hong Kong into Sarawak. The Sarawak Overseas Chinese Democratic Youth League (砂拉越新民主主义青年团) was formed in 1951 in Kuching Chung Hua Middle School (古晋中华中学), led by a student named Weng Min Chyuan (文铭权). However, organisation was disbanded in 1952. Communist influence also penetrated the labour movement, trade unions, the Chinese-language media, and the predominantly-Chinese Sarawak United People's Party (SUPP), the state's first political party which was founded in June 1959. The communist organisations operated through both legitimate and secret organisations to propagate communism. Their tactic was to establish a "united front" with other left-wing and anti-colonial groups in Sarawak to achieve their goal of independence of the colony from British rule. First known communist operation was an assault on the Batu Kitang bazaar on 5 August 1952. In response, the Sarawak colonial government approved more funding for security measures, strengthen the security forces, and introduced legislation to deal with internal security.

Under the guidance of the Malayan Communist Party (MCP), the Sarawak Liberation League (SLL) was founded in July 1953 in Kuching, led by Weng Min Chyuan. The objective of SLL was to gain autonomy first, then topple the British colonial authority to build an independent sovereign country, promoting equality for all, and individual democratic rights. Central to SLL philosophy was Marxism–Leninism–Maoism. The governing principle of SLL is based on democratic centralism. On 30 March 1955, SLL successfully organised student class strike in Kuching Chung Hua Middle School. In the second half of 1955, SLL set up Sarawak Advanced Youths' Association (砂拉越先进青年会, SAYA). From 1953 to 1962, SLL organising various mass activities, holding onto the non-violent principles. These communist movements were dominated by ethnic Chinese but also included a small number of Dayak supporters of about 10% despite various efforts by the communists to garner support from them. However, the communist movements received little support from ethnic Malays and other indigenous Sarawak races. SLL also recognised the need to win over the natives to ensure a successful armed struggle in Sarawak.

All the communists movements including unions, schools, associations, sports and cultural groups associated with it and later North Kalimantan Communist Party (NKCP) were collectively known by government sources as "Clandestine Communist Organisations" (CCO) or "Sarawak Communist Organisations" (SCO).

=== Brunei revolt and the start of armed insurrection ===
Wen Min Chyuan met the Brunei People's Party representatives in April 1962 at Miri, Sarawak. On 22 June 1962, Wen Min Chyuan, together with Bong Kee Chok and Wang Fu Ying (王馥英) were captured and deported out of Sarawak. The Brunei revolt happened on 8 December 1962. It was a failed uprising against the British by the Brunei People's Party and its military wing, the North Kalimantan National Army (Tentera Nasional Kalimantan Utara, TNKU), who were opposed to the Federation of Malaysia and wanted to create a state in northern Borneo consisting of Brunei, Sarawak, and North Borneo. The SLL leaders Wen Min Chyuan and Bong Kee Chok were aware of A.M Azahari's planned revolt but were reluctant to resort to guerrilla warfare due to their weak presence in Sarawak's Fourth and Fifth Divisions, which were located adjacent to Brunei. In December 1962, the SLL still lacked a military wing and its members had not yet undergone military training. Following the Brunei Revolt, the SLL switched to a policy of armed insurgency from January 1963 since the defeat of the Bruneian rebels deprived it of a source of weapons. The SLL and later NKCP guerrillas would fight alongside the TNKU and Indonesian forces during the Indonesia–Malaysia confrontation (1963–1966).

Following the Brunei revolt, the British authorities in British Borneo, in co-operation with the Malaysian Special Branch, launched a crackdown on suspected communists in Sarawak which prompted 700–800 Chinese youths to flee to Indonesian Kalimantan. In early 1963, Wen Ming Chyuan and Bong Kee Chok arrived in West Kalimantan from China. Together with 12 other people, they received military officer training at Java island, Indonesia on 22 December 1963. From March to September 1963, SLL sent 500 people to Indonesia to participate in revolutionary works. There, they received military-style training at Indonesian camps. At that time, President Sukarno was pro-communist and anti-Western. As with Sukarno and the Indonesian Communist Party (PKI), the Sarawak Communists opposed the newly formed Federation of Malaysia as a "neo-colonialist conspiracy" and supported the unification of all former British territories in Borneo to create an independent leftist North Kalimantan state. A.M. Azahari's Brunei People's Party and the SUPP also shared the same sentiments with Sarawak communists and PKI. Former British soldier and writer Will Fowler said that the SCO had plans to launch attacks on police stations and to ambush security forces, paralleling similar tactics used by the Malayan National Liberation Army during the Malayan Emergency.

=== North Kalimantan Communist Party (NKCP) ===
Due to the Sukarno government's hostility to Britain and Malaysia, and the proliferation of the Communist Party of Indonesia, the Sarawak communists used Indonesian Kalimantan as a base for building up a guerrilla force. The communist exiles in Indonesia would form the core of the North Kalimantan Communist Party's two guerrilla formations: the Sarawak People's Guerrilla Force (Pasukan Gerilya Rakyat Sarawak, PGRS) and the North Kalimantan People's Army (Pasukan Rakyat Kalimantan Utara, PARAKU). The PGRS was formed on 30 March 1964 at Mount Asuansang in Paloh, Sambas, West Kalimantan with the assistance of the Indonesian Ministry of Foreign Affairs. The PGRS's leaders included Bong Kee Chok, Yang Chu Chung, and Wen Ming Chyuan. (Note: Vernon Porritt lists the date of the Sarawak People's Gueriella Force's establishment as 20 March 1964.) According to Conboy, the PGRS numbered about 800 and was based in West Kalimantan at Batu Hitam, with a contingent of 120 from the Indonesian intelligence agency and a small cadre trained in China. The Indonesian Communist Party was also present and was led by an ethnic Arab revolutionary, Sofyan. The PGRS ran some raids into Sarawak but spent more time developing their supporters in Sarawak. The Indonesian armed forces did not approve of the leftist nature of the PGRS and generally avoided them.

On 18 August 1964, SLL set up North Kalimantan National Liberation Alliance （北加里曼丹民族解放同盟). SLL had 3 representatives in North Kalimantan revolutionary government-in-exile. In the meeting on 7 March 1965 at Pontianak, Kalimantan Borneo, North Kalimantan National Front （Front Nasional Kalimantan Utara, 北加里曼丹民族阵线） was established. A meeting on 19 September 1965 led to the formal establishment of North Kalimantan Communist Party (NKCP) and SLL was dissolved. By 1964, government sources estimated 800 to 1,000 well-trained communist participants. At its height, the SCO had 24,000 members.

The North Kalimantan People's Army (PARAKU) was formed by Bong Kee Chok near Melawi River in West Kalimantan with the assistance of the PKI on 26 October 1965. While the PGRS under its commander Yang operated in western Sarawak, the PARAKU operated in eastern Sarawak. The PARAKU was initially commanded by Lam Wah Kwai, who was succeeded by Bong Kee Chok. According to Kenneth Conboy, Soebandrio met with a group of Sarawak Communist leaders in Bogor, and Nasution sent three trainers from Resimen Para Komando Angkatan Darat (RPKAD) Battalion 2 to Nangabadan near the Sarawak border, where there were about 300 trainees. Some three months later, two lieutenants were also sent there.

On 30 March 1970, Wen Ming Chyuan, the Head of the Sarawak People's Guerrillas in Sarawak's First Division, formed the North Kalimantan Communist Party.

The 19 September 1971 was chosen as the official date of the formation of the party to coincide with the Pontianak Conference, which had been held on 17–19 September 1965. While the Pontianak Conference was regarded as the foundation of the Sarawak Communist Movement, none of the conference attendees were communist. Instead, they consisted of members of the left-wing SLL and the "O Members" of the Advanced Youths Association. While they had discussed creating a communist party in Sarawak, they delayed doing so until 1971 due to the tense political situation in Indonesia.

=== Supporting Indonesian confrontation against the formation of Malaysia ===
The Indonesians had planned to use the Sarawak communists as an indigenous front for their operations during the Indonesia–Malaysia confrontation. To support this ruse, they even named the organisation the North Kalimantan National Army (Tentara Nasional Kalimantan Utara, TNKU), to link the SCO to the original Bruneian rebels. While the first raids included SCO members, they were often led by regular Indonesian officers or non-commissioned officers from the Marine commandos (Korps Komando Operasi, KKO), the Army para-commandos (Resimen Para Komando Angkatan Darat, RPKAD), and the Air Force paratroopers ( Pasukan Gerak Tjepat, PGT).

Following an attempted coup by pro-PKI elements in the Indonesian military in October 1965, General Suharto assumed power and launched a purge of Communist elements. Overnight, the Sarawak communists lost a safe haven and the Indonesian military would subsequently co-operate with the Malaysians in counter-insurgency operations against their former allies. According to Porritt, the Indonesian anti-Communist purge was also accompanied by a Dayak-led pogrom targeting Chinese Indonesians in West Kalimantan, which received tacit support from the Indonesian authorities.

=== Counter-insurgency efforts ===
In response to the SCO's activities, the Sarawak and Malaysian federal authority resorted to various counter-insurgency operations. On 30 June 1965, the Sarawak government's Operations Sub-Committee of the State Security Executive Council (Ops SSEC) implemented the Goodsir Plan. This plan involved the resettlement of 7,500 people in five "temporary settlements" along the Kuching-Serian road in Sarawak's First and Third Divisions. The Goodsir Plan was named after David Goodsir, the British acting commissioner of police in Sarawak. These settlements were protected by barbed wire and modelled after the successful new villages used earlier during the Malayan Emergency. As with the Briggs Plan, the Goodsir Plan's "controlled areas" succeeded in denying the SCO access to food supplies, basic materials, and intelligence from their Chinese supporters. By the end of 1965, 63 suspected communists activists had been identified by the authorities. By the end of 1965, the Federal Government had built three permanent settlements at Siburan, Beratok, and Tapah to replace the five temporary settlements, which covered 600 acres and were designed to accommodate 8,000 inhabitants.

By 22 July 1966, the Malaysian prime minister Tunku Abdul Rahman estimated that there were approximately 700 communists in Indonesian Kalimantan and about 2,000 sympathisers. Abdul Rahman also offered amnesty and safe-conduct passes to SCO guerrillas under Operation Harapan, but only 41 guerrillas accepted this offer. The end of the Indonesian-Malaysian Confrontation also enabled the establishment of military co-operation between the Indonesian and Malaysian armed forces against SCO guerrillas in Borneo. In October 1966, both governments allowed their military forces to cross the border in "hot pursuit" operations. Between 1967 and 1968, Indonesian and Malaysian military forces took part in joint operations against the Sarawak Communists, which took an increasingly heavy toll on both the Sarawak People's Guerrilla Force and the North Kalimantan Liberation Army. Due to a decline in manpower, resources and increased isolation from their support base, the SCO shifted from guerrilla warfare towards reestablishing the movement's link with the masses, including the natives, to preserve the 'armed struggle'.

In February 1969, the Sarawak United People's Party's leadership reversed the party's anti-Malaysia policy following a meeting between the party's leader Stephen Yong and Abdul Rahman. Prior to that, the SUPP had been the main left-wing opposition party in Sarawak and enjoyed the support of Sarawak's ethnic Chinese community. Several members of the party were also members of communist-affiliated organisations like the Sarawak Advanced Youths' Association (SAYA), the Sarawak Farmers' Organisation, and the Brunei People Party's guerrilla wing, the North Kalimantan National Army. The SUPP's communist elements were decimated as a result of a statewide crackdown by the authorities between 1968 and 1969. Following state elections in July 1970, the SUPP then entered into a coalition with the Alliance Party's Sarawak partners, the Bumiputera Party and the Parti Pesaka Anak Sarawak, in the Sarawak State Legislative Assembly. This enabled the Malaysian Federal government to consolidate its control over Sarawak. In exchange, Stephen Yong was appointed to the State Operation's Committee, the state's security committee, which enabled the party to influence counter-insurgency operations and to look after the welfare of SUPP detainees and Chinese settlers in the resettlement centres.

On 25 March 1969, Indonesian forces eliminated the Third Branch of the SPGF at Songkong in West Kalimantan following a two-day battle, wiping out the Sarawak People's Guerrilla Force's largest corps. To replace the decimated SPGF, the Sarawak Communist Organisation created the North Kalimantan People's Guerrilla Force at Nonok on 13 July 1969.

=== Rajang Area Security Command (RASCOM) ===
The Rajang Area Security Command or simply known as RASCOM is a Malaysian security area that covers the area of Rajang River in Sarawak. It was established on 26 March 1972 by the Malaysian government and its main headquarters is located at Sibu.

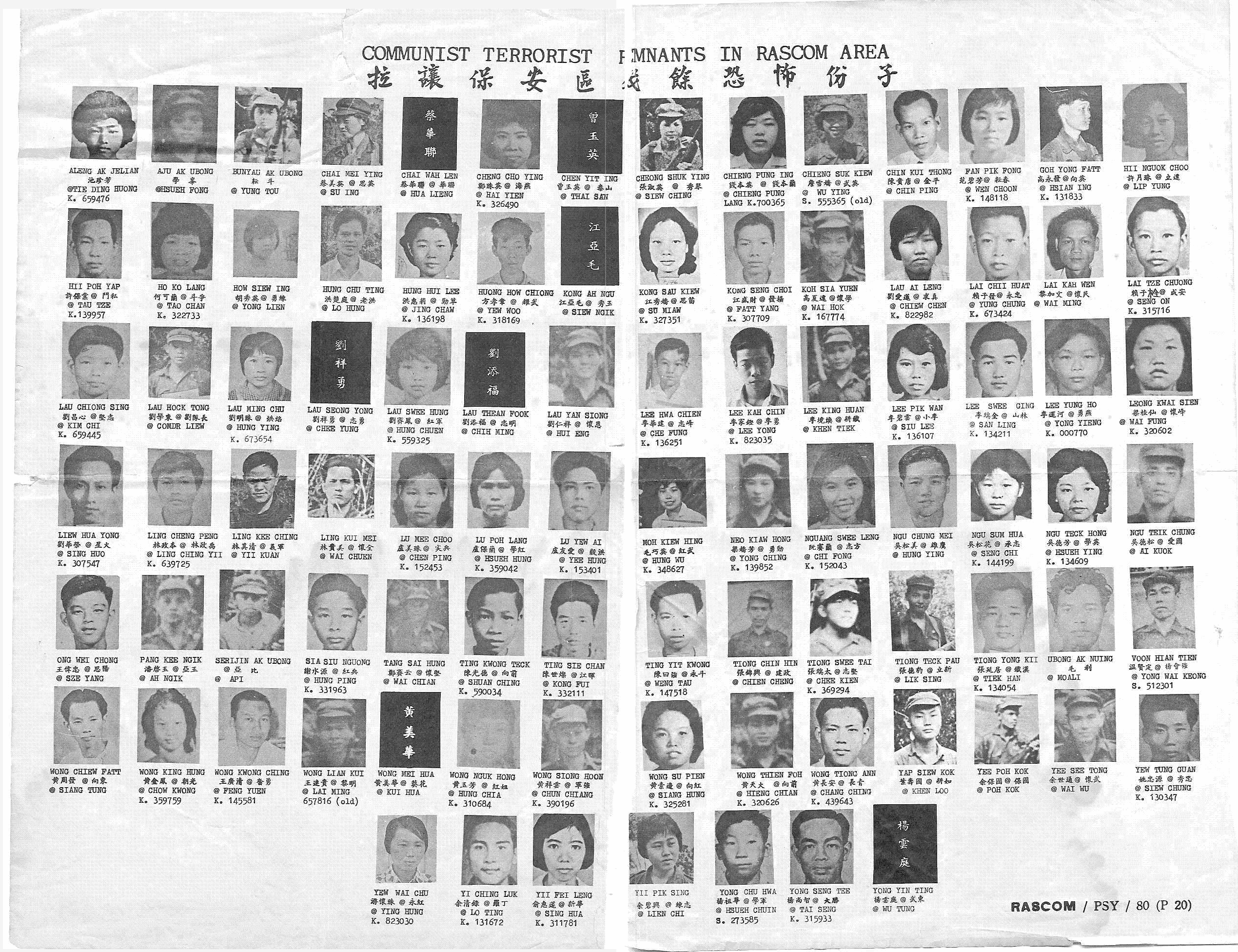
Poster of Communist remnants in RASCOM area, Borneo, circa 1980.

=== Defections and decline ===
The Sarawak Chief Minister Abdul Rahman Ya'kub also made several overtures to the NKCP insurgents and managed to convince several of the insurgents to lay down their arms. In 1973–74, the Malaysian government scored a key victory when Rahman Ya'kub successfully convinced one of the NKCP leaders Bong Kee Chok to surrender along with 481 of his supporters. This was a heavy loss for the NKCP since this number comprised approximately 75 per cent of the NKCP's entire force in Sarawak. The Sri Aman treaty was signed between the Sarawak government and the communist representatives on 6 March 1974 in Simanggang. The name of the township was subsequently changed to "Sri Aman" where Aman is the Malay word for "peace". However, one year after the treaty was signed, more than a hundred of those who surrendered retreated back into the jungles to continue their armed struggle against the government until 1990. In 1975, Chao Hui Ko and his wife, together with a hundred guerrilla members of Sarawak People's Guerrilla Force laid down their arms. They were given vendor licenses to operate their stalls at a hawker centre near SOC Kuching bus station.

After this defection, only 121 guerrilla fighters led by Hung Chu Ting and Wong Lian Kui remained. By 1974, the Communist insurgency had become confined to the Rejang Delta. Both sides sustained casualties and many civilians were also killed and wounded in the cross-fire.

Following the successful Hat Yai peace accords between the MCP and the Malaysian government in 1989, the remaining NKCP guerrillas decided to end their insurgency after one of their Chinese contacts Weng Min Chyuan convinced them to negotiate with the Sarawak state government. In July 1990, a series of negotiations between the NKCP and the Sarawak government took place at the town of Bintulu. By 17 October 1990, a peace agreement formally ending the insurgency was ratified at Wisma Bapa Malaysia in the state capital Kuching. Shortly afterwards, the last remaining NKCP operatives led by Ang Cho Teng surrendered. These developments ended the communist insurgency in Sarawak.

== See also ==
- Communist insurgency in Malaysia (1968–1989)
- Indonesia–Malaysia confrontation
- Malayan Emergency
- North Kalimantan Communist Party

== Footnotes ==
=== Bibliography ===
- der Kroef, Justus M. van (1964). "Communism and the Guerrilla War in Sarawak". The World Today. 20 (2): 50–60. JSTOR 40393581.
- Cheah, Boon Kheng (2009). "The Communist Insurgency in Malaysia, 1948–90: Contesting the Nation-State and Social Change" (PDF). New Zealand Journal of Asian Studies. 11 (1): 132–152. Archived from the original (PDF) on 20 January 2021.
- Conboy, Ken (2003). KOPASSUS Inside Indonesia's Special Forces. Sheffield, United Kingdom: Equinox Publishing. ISBN 978-979-95898-8-0.
- Ghosh, S. K. "Insurgent Movements in Southeast Asia." India Quarterly 34.3 (1978): 290-312.
