= Biawak =

- Location within Borneo
- Coordinates: 1.61667°N 109.7°E
- Country: Malaysia
- State: Sarawak
- Elevation: 60 m (200 ft)

Biawak (also known as Kampung Biawak) is a settlement in Lundu District, Sarawak, Malaysia. It lies approximately 70.6 kilometres (44 mi) west of the state capital Kuching, very close to the border with Indonesian Kalimantan.

The name biawak is the Malay word for big lizard such as monitor lizard, iguana etc.

Neighbouring settlements include:

- Kampung Pasir Ulu 1.9 kilometres (1.2 mi) north
- Kampung Pasir Tengah 3.7 kilometres (2.3 mi) east
- Kampung Jantan 5.9 kilometres (3.7 mi) north
- Kampung Tanjam 8.3 kilometres (5.2 mi) northeast
- Tanjan 8.3 kilometres (5.2 mi) northeast
- Kampung Kerengga 8.3 kilometres (5.2 mi) northeast
- Kampung Menera 9.5 kilometres (5.9 mi) east

A border crossing into Indonesia is located near the settlement. The Malaysia immigration, customs, quarantine and security checkpoint is called the Biawak ICQS checkpoint while the Indonesian border crossing checkpoint is Aruk, located in Sambas Regency, West Kalimantan.
