= Sayidiman Suryohadiprojo =

Indonesian military officer and diplomat (1927–2021)

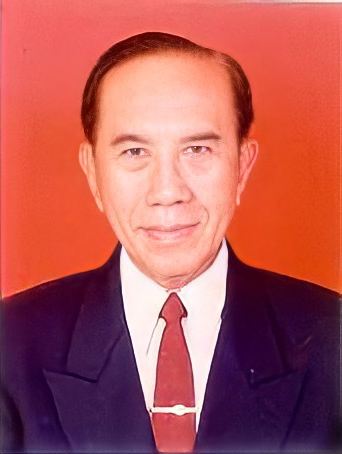

Member of the People's Consultative Assembly
- In office 1 July 1998 – 1 October 1999
- President: B. J. Habibie

Indonesian Ambassador at-large to Africa
- In office 14 November 1992 – 20 October 1995
- President: Suharto
- Preceded by: Office established
- Succeeded by: Office dissolved

Indonesian Ambassador to Japan
- In office 23 June 1979 – 31 August 1983
- President: Suharto
- Preceded by: A. J. Witono
- Succeeded by: Wiyogo Atmodarminto

Personal details
- Born: Sayidiman; 21 September 1927 Bojonegoro, East Java, Dutch East Indies
- Died: 16 January 2021 (aged 93) Gatot Soebroto Army Hospital, Jakarta, Indonesia
- Spouse(s): Sri Suharyati Djatioetomo (m. 1958; died 1994) Harpini Winastuti Kadarisman (m. 1996)
- Parent(s): Bawadiman Kartohadiprodjo; Oemi Oentari Kartohadiprodjo
- Website: sayidiman.suryohadiprojo.com

Military service
- Allegiance: Indonesia
- Branch/service: Army
- Years of service: 1945—1982
- Rank: Lieutenant General
- Battles/wars: Indonesian National Revolution

Sayidiman Suryohadiprojo (21 September 1927 – 16 January 2021) was an Indonesian military officer and diplomat who served as Deputy Chief of Staff of the Indonesian Army from 1973 until 1974, Ambassador of Indonesia to Japan from 1979 until 1983, and Ambassador-at-large of Indonesia to Africa from 1992 until 1995.

== Early life ==
Sayidiman was born on 21 September 1927 in Bojonegoro, East Java, to Bawadiman Kartohadiprodjo and Umi Untari Kartohadiprodjo. Sayidiman's father, who served as the Regent of Pasuruan from 1932 until 1933, died while Sayidiman was six years old. As most Javanese at the time, Sayidiman was born with a mononym. The sixth of seven children in a Muslim family, he has two brothers named Soediman Kartohadiprodjo and Soekarmen Koesoemohadiprodjo and four sisters named Soelasikin, Soelasbawiati, Soelasbawiatini, and Soelasmiarti.

Sayidiman attended the Europeesche Lagere School (European Primary School) from 1932 to 1939. He continued his studies at the Hogere Burgerschool (Higher Civic School) from 1939 until 1942, at the Taman Dewasa from 1942 until 1942, and at the High School from 1943 until 1945.

== Military career ==
=== National Military Academy ===
Following the proclamation of Indonesian independence, Sayidiman enrolled at the Yogya Military Academy in Jogjakarta. At that time, the academy was just recently established on 31 October 1945. Sayidiman, along with 441 other cadets, was accepted into the academy.

After Sayidiman finished his final exam, he was deployed to Surakarta on 19 September 1948 to quell the Madiun Affair. Sayidiman was put in command of the 1st Platoon of the S Company. The company was initially deployed in Surakarta, but was transferred to Wonogiri after the Nasuhi Battalion—the main battalion of the company—faced heavy resistance from the People's Democratic Front troops. The conflict ended at the end of October 1948, and Sayidiman was withdrawn from the battlefield to prepare for his graduation.

Sayidiman graduated with the rank of second lieutenant on 28 November 1948 in a ceremony at the Istana Negara. Sayidiman became the third best graduate from the academy after Kun Suryoatmodjo and Subroto. As the third best graduate from the academy, Sayidiman was given the privilege of choosing his post. Sayidiman choose to be posted in the Siliwangi Division due to his previous experience of commanding a platoon in the division.

=== Deployments ===
A month after his graduation from the academy, the Dutch began a military offensive codenamed Operation Kraai. As a second lieutenant, Sayidiman returned to his post as a platoon commander inside the Nasuhi Battalion. Sayidiman did not hold his old post for a long period as in December 1949 he was transferred to command the 1st company inside the 13th Brigade in an acting capacity. After the peace treaty between Indonesia and the Dutch was signed, Sayidiman was promoted to first lieutenant on 12 April 1950 and became the company's commander. Following a reorganization inside the 13th Brigade, Sayidiman was transferred to the 2nd Company in the battalion in June 1950, where he fought against the Darul Islam rebels. According to Salim Said, a lecturer in the Indonesian Defence University, Sayidiman initially wanted to attend military schools abroad after the peace treaty was made but changed his mind because he felt that he "owed a debt of gratitude to the people". (Note: Original translation: Tapi, dia merasa utang budi ke rakyat sehingga tetap menjadi perwira di Siliwangi)

On 4 January 1951, Sayidiman was instructed by the Chief of Staff of the Indonesian Army to attend the United States Army Infantry School. After he graduated in 1953, Sayidiman returned to Indonesia and enrolled at the Economic Faculty of the Padjadjaran University. Aside from his study in the university, Sayidiman also taught at the Infantry Training Center. In accordance with his new assignment, Sayidiman was promoted to captain on 1 July 1954. Sayidiman studied for three years in the university until 1 November 1956. He dropped out of the university due to his appointment as a teaching officer in the National Military Academy.

Sayidiman taught in the National Military Academy for a year until he was appointed as the Commander of the 309th Battalion, which was part of the Siliwangi Regional Military Command. Sayidiman was promoted to lieutenant colonel and his battalion was deployed to fought against the Revolutionary Government of the Republic of Indonesia (PRRI) in North Sumatra. On 18 October 1958, the battalion departed from the Tanjung Priok Harbor for Sibolga, one of the main base of the PRRI forces. The battalion landed three days later, and on 24 October the battalion launched its first attack at the Simaninggir and Bahan Dolok villages in South Tapanuli. The two village was occupied despite facing vicious resistance from the PRRI forces. Sayidiman later expanded the battalion's offensive scope and occupied Kuta Rampak village and Aek Raisan bridge. Military posts were established around the occupied area. Aside from establishing posts, Sayidiman's battalion also established contact with the 330th Battalion, which was stationed in Tarutung. The establishment of contact between both battalions allowed the Commander of the Siliwangi Military Region, R.A. Kosasih, to inspect the battalion's posts.

At the end of 1958, the battalion launched intensive attacks against the PRRI forces. The battalion suffered several casualties during these operations.

=== In the Military Academy and Indonesian Army Headquarters ===
After his deployment in North Sumatra, Sayidiman was promoted to major and was posted to the Indonesian Military Academy. He served as deputy commander of the academy's cadet corps. He also served as the deputy commander of the cadet regiment, coordinator officer for the military education department, and later as the acting director for the military academy. Sayidiman's office as acting director was the last office he held in the academy, as in January 1962 the office was handed over to Pranoto Asmoro. Sayidiman was promoted to Lieutenant Colonel and was transferred to Jakarta to serve in the Indonesian Army Headquarters.

Sayidiman served as an officer for organizational affairs in the headquarters. In March 1964, Sayidiman was given the opportunity to attend the Bundeswehr Command and Staff College in Hamburg. Sayidiman finished his study in 1965 and he was promoted to Colonel after he returned to Indonesia. After serving as an assistant officer in the headquarters for a year, Sayidiman was promoted to Brigadier General in November 1966 and became the Deputy to the Assistant II (Operations) of the Chief of Staff. He held the office for two years until 1968.

=== Commander of the Hasanuddin Military Region ===
Sayidiman was inaugurated as the Commander of the Hasanuddin Military Region on 3 August 1968, replacing Solichin GP, the previous commander. Sayidiman's appointment as a commander of a military region marked his service in a total of four different military fields: combat, education, staff, and territorial. Under his command, the military region launched Operation Lighting (Operasi Kilat) to exterminate communists rebels who sided with the 30 September movement. The operation resulted in the execution of Marcus Girat, the leader of communist guerilla groups in the Eastern Indonesia region and the arrest of Muhammad Kasim, the incumbent regent of Buton who was accused of being involved in the movement. Sayidiman ended his tenure in the region on 16 March 1970 and was replaced by Abdul Azis Bustam.

=== Joint Chairman for Personnel Affairs ===
In January 1970, Sayidiman was appointed as the Joint Chairman for Personnel Affairs in the armed forces. Herlan, the previous officeholder, handed over his office to Sayidiman in April 1970. The office of joint chairman was Sayidiman's first office outside the army, as the office served as a liaison between the four branches of the armed forces. Sayidiman implemented the uniformization of the military insignia between the different branches of the armed forces. The project began in November 1971 and the new insignia was introduced in May 1973.

=== Deputy Chief of Staff of the Indonesian Army ===
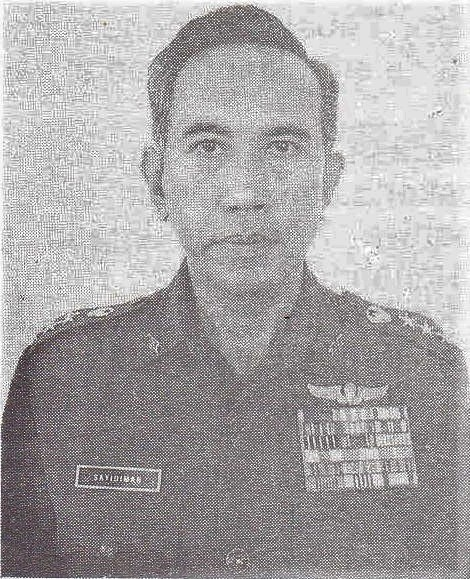
Deputy Chief of Staff of the Indonesian Army, Sayidiman Suryohadiprojo

After serving in various army offices, Sayidiman was inaugurated as the Deputy Chief of Staff of the Indonesian Army—the second highest office in the Indonesian Army—on 26 March 1973. Sayidiman's appointment was labeled as a "transitional bridge" (jembatan peralihan) between the pre-1945 generation in the army and the post-1945 generation. Umar Wirahadikusumah, the army chief of staff at that time, stated in the inauguration that Sayidiman was the first member of the post-1945 generation to reach a high position in the army and that he would spearhead the transition of generation in the armed forces. The Kompas editorial on 28 March 1973 praised Umar's statement about Sayidiman and remarked that "The inauguration would have been a routine tour of duty if it wasn't for Umar Wirahadikusuma's statement about the transition of generation."

Since the beginning of his tenure, Sayidiman traveled to various regions in Indonesia. Sayidiman visited Irian Jaya (now Papua) and South Sulawesi in June 1973 as part of a working trip. After that, Sayidiman traveled to Japan in October 1973 to represent the Pangkopkamtib in the 3rd Williamson Conference. Sayidiman was promoted to Lieutenant General on 1 December 1973; he attended the First Japanese Indonesian Conference in 1973 on the same month.

However, his tenure as the deputy chief of staff was short-lasted, as on 12 June 1974 he was dismissed from his position. Umar's plan on the transition of generation was reversed and Wahono—a pre-1945 generation—was appointed to replace Sayidiman. His sudden dismissal made him confused. Makmun Murod, the chief of staff at the time of Sayidiman's dismissal, stated that he was not involved in the dismissal process. Maraden Panggabean, the commander of the armed forces, revealed that Suharto, the president himself, directly ordered the dismissal of Sayidiman. Sayidiman was shocked to hear it, as he believed that he had done nothing wrong during his tenure.

Sayidiman had a chance to ask about his dismissal when he was about to conduct a report of duty as the Governor of the National Resilience Institute to President Suharto. Sayidiman finally realized the reason behind his sudden dismissal, although Suharto did not state it explicitly. Suharto only stated that Sayidiman was careless about other people's efforts to attract his influence and advise him to frequently consult with other people. (Note: Original translation: Sayidiman kurang berhati-hati terhadap usaha orang lain untuk menarik pengaruhnya. Presiden berpesan supaya ia kelak lebih banyak konsultasi dengan pihak lain.)

There were several interpretations as to Sayidiman's dismissal. Sayidiman found out that Suharto has been informed that during his tenure in the Indonesian Military Academy, he had a close relationship with the 1960 graduates of the academy, which was considered as loyal to Sukarno, Suharto's political enemy. Suharto believed that this relationship still exists even until his appointment as deputy chief of staff. To this, Sayidiman stated in his autobiography that the allegation was a baseless hoax and Suharto was misinformed about his decision.

Another version came from Salim Said. Said believed that Sayidiman's dismissal had something to do with Sumitro's—the deputy commander of the armed forces—fall from grace. Sayidiman, Sumitro, and another Indonesian Army officer named Hasnan Habib were known as the "golden boys of the army" due to their intelligence and were tasked to create and enact a concept for the armed forces' reformation. However, Sumitro lost his influence in the military in the beginning of 1974: Sumitro resigned from the office of Pangkopkamtib in January 1974 and from the office of the Deputy Commander of the Armed Forces in March 1974. Salim Said believed that Sayidiman was dismissed due to his close relationship with Sumitro.

== Civilian offices ==
=== Governor of the National Resilience Institute ===
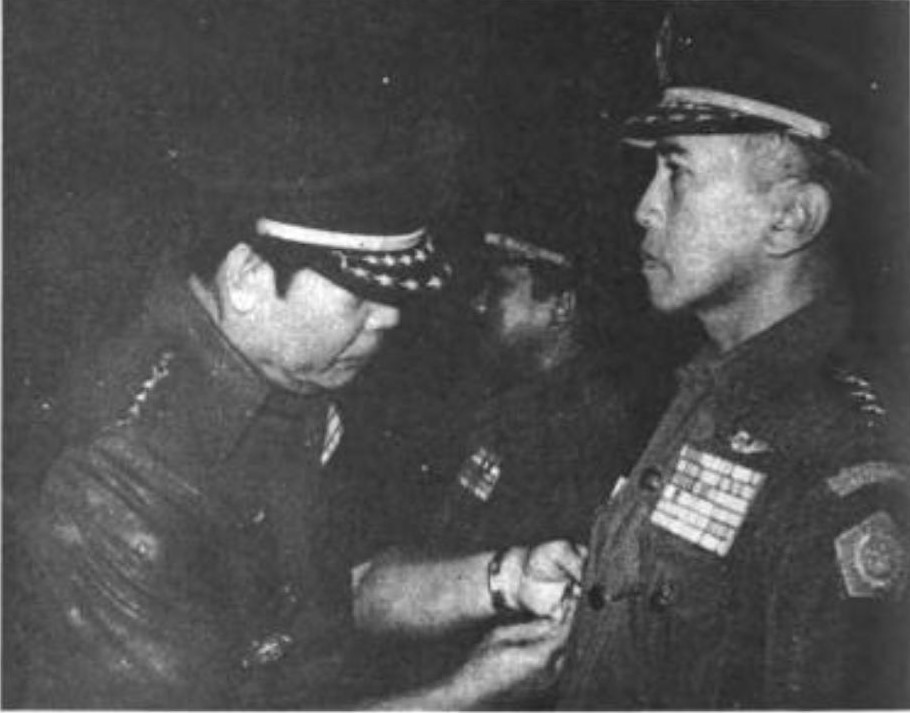
Inauguration of Sayidiman Suryohadiprojo as the Governor of the National Resilience Institute.

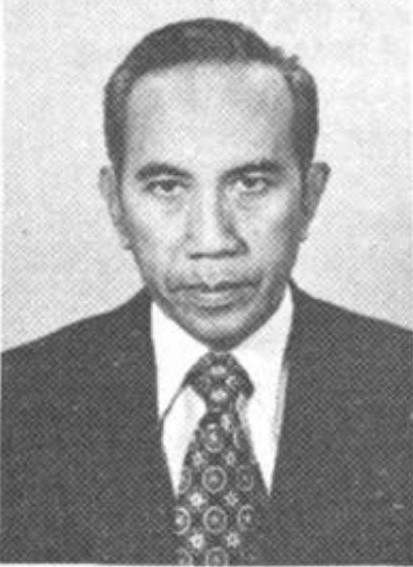
Sayidiman Suryohadiprojo as a member of the People's Consultative Assembly in 1977.

Three days after he was dismissed from the army, Sayidiman was appointed as the Governor of the National Resilience Institute, replacing his former superior R.A. Kosasih. Sayidiman held the office for five years until he was replaced by Sutopo Juwono in November 1978. Sayidiman also briefly served as the member of the People's Consultative Assembly from 1977 until 1978.

=== Ambassador to Japan ===
After he was replaced by Sutopo Juwono, Sayidiman became inactive until his appointment as ambassador. Sayidiman—along with three other ambassadors—was inaugurated on 23 June 1979 and presented his credentials to Hirohito on 20 July. Sayidiman served as ambassador for six years until he was replaced by Wiyogo Atmodarminto on 31 August 1983.

As the ambassador, Sayidiman promoted the Indonesian culture to the Japanese public. In cooperation with the Japan Indonesian Association, the embassy began an Indonesian language course. The course was held for thirty times every year and was held until today. Sayidiman also embarked on a cultural project to introduce fragments and archaeological collections from Borobudur. The exhibition was held in various regions throughout Japan and the opening ceremony was attended by officials from both country. The event was so popular that the embassy had difficulties in fulfilling requests from regions who wanted to host the exhibition.

Sayidiman also published the first book about Japan in the Indonesian language, titled Japanese People and Society in the Struggle for Life (Manusia dan Masyarakat Jepang dalam Perjuangan Hidup). The book, which has 350 pages, analyzes the strength of weakness of the Japanese society.

At the end of his tenure, Sayidiman received a letter from the President about his retirement from the military. Sayidiman officially retired on 1 October 1982.

=== Advisor and commissioner ===
Between 1982 and 1992, Sayidiman served in various governmental positions. Sayidiman served as the advisor for defence affairs to the Minister of Research and Technology B. J. Habibie and as the chief director of the State Plantation Company XXIV/XXV in East Java. When the Indonesian Association of Muslim Intellectuals was established in 1990, Sayidiman was trusted as the member of the board of experts and as the deputy chairman of the advisory board.

=== Ambassador-at-large to Africa ===
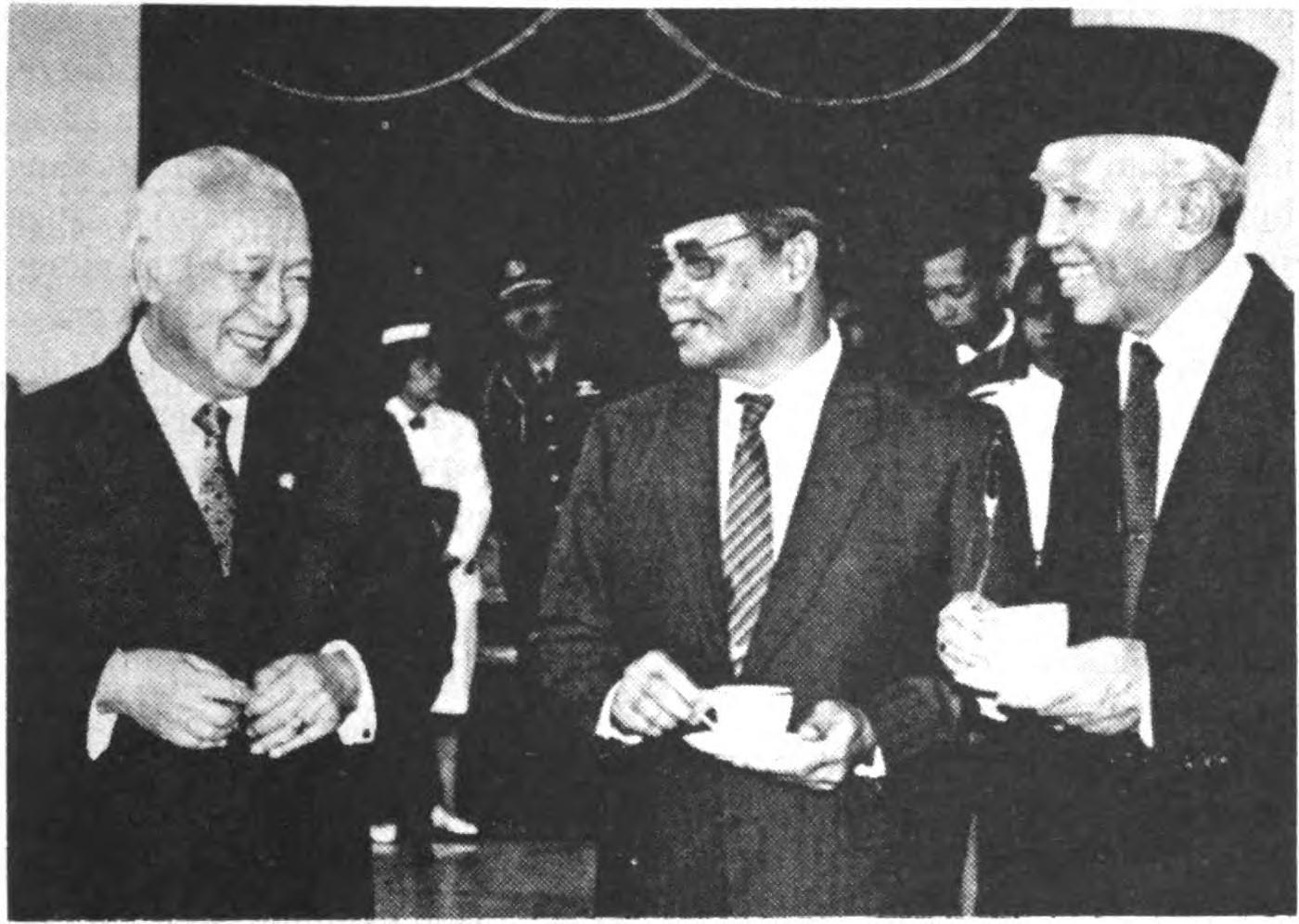
Sayidiman with Suharto and Achmad Tahir shortly after his inauguration as ambassador-at-large.

Suharto, the president of Indonesia, was elected as the chairman of the Non-Aligned Movement at the 1992 summit of the movement. Suharto, who had to deal with diplomacy at a wider level, appointed four ambassadors-at-large to assist him in his task as a chairman. Sayidiman was appointed by Suharto as Indonesia's ambassador at large to Africa on 14 November 1992. In 1993, Sayidiman, along with the ambassador to Ethiopia, Dadang Sukandar was invited by the Provisional Government of Eritrea to observe the Eritrean independence referendum. The referendum resulted in a landslide majority in favor of independence. The office of ambassador-at-large was dissolved after Suharto resigned from the office of chairman on 20 October 1995.

== Later life and death ==
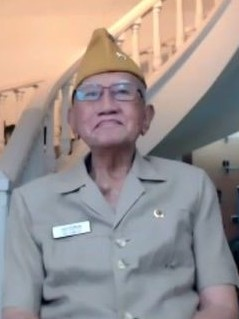
Sayidiman Suryohadiprojo in May 2020, seven months before his death.

Since the 1990s, Sayidiman became critical of Suharto's autocratic rule. In 1991, the authors for Suharto's Festschrift interviewed Sayidiman for his thoughts and opinion about Suharto. Beyond their expectations, Sayidiman demanded Suharto to resign from the presidency as soon as possible and refuse to serve his sixth five-year term. When Suharto heard about Sayidiman's demand, he refused to fulfill it and the story about Sayidiman's demand was omitted from Suharto's Festschrift. Suharto would continue to serve for his sixth term until he resigned two months into his seventh term. Suharto's resignation transformed Sayidiman from a supporter of the military's dual function to an opposition. Sayidiman, along with other retired military officers, viewed the dual function as inefficient and failing to either defend Suharto or resolve prevalent regional conflicts in Aceh, East Timor, and Papua.

After Suharto resigned on 21 May 1998, B. J. Habibie, Suharto's vice president, succeeded him as president. Habibie conducted various political reformations, including replacing pro-Suharto members from the Groups Delegation fraction in the People's Consultative Assembly. Forty-one members from the fraction was recalled, including a veteran delegate. Sayidiman, who was a supporter of the reformation process, was appointed to replace the delegate. Sayidiman was inaugurated on 1 July 1998 and served for a year and three months in the council. Aside from his membership in the People's Consultative Assembly, Sayidiman was also appointed by Habibie as an advisor to the National Reformation Team and as a member of the National Education Advisory Board for a second term.

Sayidiman died at 16.15 on 16 January 2021 in the Gatot Soebroto Army Hospital, Jakarta.

== Personal life ==
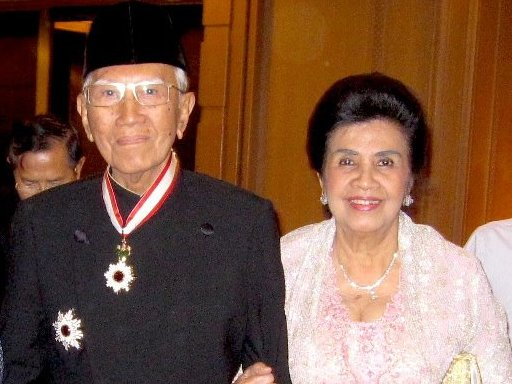
Sayidiman Suryohadiprojo with his second wife, Harpini Winastuti Kadarisman, in 2012.

Sayidiman was married to Sri Suharyati Djatioetomo, the daughter of a police general, on 6 July 1958. In accordance to Javanese customs at that time, married men with a mononym could choose a last name, known as nama tua. Sayidiman picked Suryohadiprojo as his nama tua. The marriage resulted in five children, namely Adwin Haryanto, Laksmi Adriyani, Umi Riyanti, Adri Sarosa, and Diana Lestari. However, four years after Sri gave birth to her youngest child, she suffered a chronic disease. Sri Suharyati later died on 1 June 1994. After a period of mourning, Sayidiman married again to Harpini Winastuti Kadarisman on 6 January 1996.

== Works ==
Throughout his life, Sayidiman wrote various books and scientific journals. Sayidiman's first book was an Indonesian translation of Infantry Tactics and Techniques (Taktik dan Tehnik Infantry), which was published in 1954. Sayidiman later wrote his first book, titled Masalah-Masalah Pertahanan Negara (Problems of National Defence) in 1964. From 1970 until 2019, Sayidiman would write fourteen other books, including his autobiography, written in 1997, and a collected works published in 2013.

The list below shows books that were written by Sayidiman during his lifetime:

- Taktik dan Tehnik Infanteri [Tactics and Technique of Infantry]. Translated by Suryohadiprojo, Sayidiman. Pembimbing. 1954. p. 247.
- Suryohadiprojo, Sayidiman (1964). Masalah-Masalah Pertahanan Negara [Problems of National Defense]. PT Pembimbing Masa.
- Suryohadiprojo, Sayidiman (1970). Langkah-Langkah Perjuangan Kita [Our Steps of Struggle]. Pusat Sejarah ABRI. p. 220.
- Suryohadiprojo, Sayidiman (1982). Belajar dari Jepang : Manusia dan Masyarakat Jepang Dalam Perjuangan Hidup [Learning from Japan: Japan's Man and Society in Life Struggle]. Universitas Indonesia Press and Pustaka Bradjaguna.
- Suryohadiprojo, Sayidiman (1987). Menghadapi Tantangan Masa Depan [Facing the Challenges of the Future]. Gramedia. p. 295. ISBN 978-979-403-208-4.
- Suryohadiprojo, Sayidiman (1992). Pancasila, Islam, dan ABRI: buah renungan seorang prajurit [Pancasila, Muslim, and the Armed Forces: Thoughts of a Soldier]. Pustaka Sinar Harapan. p. 240. ISBN 978-979-416-154-8.
- Suryohadiprojo, Sayidiman (1995). Membangun Peradaban Indonesia [Building the Civilization of Indonesia]. Pustaka Sinar Harapan. p. 235. ISBN 978-979-416-312-2.
- Suryohadiprojo, Sayidiman (1996). Kepemimpinan ABRI dalam Sejarah dan Perjuangannya [Armed Forces Leadership in its History and Struggle]. Intermasa. p. 456. ISBN 978-979-8960-00-0.
- Suryohadiprojo, Sayidiman (1997). Mengabdi Negara Sebagai Prajurit TNI: Sebuah Otobiografi [Serving the Nation as an Armed Forces Soldier: An Autobiography]. Pustaka Sinar Harapan. p. 723. ISBN 978-979-416-440-2.
- Suryohadiprojo, Sayidiman (2005). Si vis pacem para bellum: Membangun Pertahanan Negara yang Modern dan Efektif [Si vis pacem para bellum: Building a Modern and Effective National Defence]. Gramedia Pustaka Utama. p. 342. ISBN 978-979-22-1501-4.
- Suryohadiprojo, Sayidiman (2007). Rakyat Sejahtera, Negara Kuat: Mewujudkan Cita-Cita Proklamasi Kemerdekaan 17 Agustus 1945 [Prosperous People, Resilient State: Implementing the Ideals of the 17 August 1945 Proclamation of Independence]. Pustaka Intermasa. p. 413. ISBN 978-979-3791-28-9.
- Suryohadiprojo, Sayidiman (2008). Pengantar Ilmu Perang [Introduction to Warfare Science]. Pustaka Intermasa. p. 176. ISBN 978-979-3791-33-3.
- Suryohadiprojo, Sayidiman (2014). Mengobarkan Kembali Api Pancasila [Reviving the Pancasila Flame]. Penerbit Buku Kompas. p. 280. ISBN 978-979-709-870-4.
- Suryohadiprojo, Sayidiman (2014). Sayidiman's Collected Writings – in English, Dutch & Deutsch.
- Suryohadiprojo, Sayidiman (2016). Budaya Gotong Royong dan Masa Depan Bangsa [The Tradition of Mutual Assistance and the Future of the Nation]. Penerbit Buku Kompas. p. 260.
- Suryohadiprojo, Sayidiman (2019). Masyarakat Pancasila [Pancasila's Society].

== Legacy ==
Sayidiman's fondness of writing books earned him the nickname of "The Thinking General". Sayidiman was often compared with other intellectual figures of the armed forces such as T. B. Simatupang, and A. H. Nasution. Agus Widjojo, who was regarded as one of the armed forces leading intellectuals, stated that "Sayidiman's train of thought has no end station. [His mind] keeps growing and developing." (Note: Original translation: Dia tidak mempunyai stasiun akhir pemikiran. Selalu terbuka dan berkembang.) Suryo Prabowo, former chief of staff of the armed forces, described Sayidiman as a "plenary professional soldier, diplomat, thinker, and educator who is still active writing books and journal until the end of his life". (Note: Original translation: Almarhum adalah tentara profesional yang paripurna, diplomat, pemikir, dan pendidik yang tetap aktif menulis buku dan jurnal sampai akhir hayatnya.)

== Awards ==
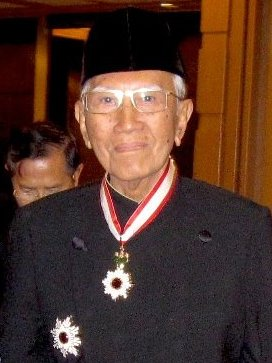
Sayidiman Suryohadiprojo after receiving the Order of the Rising Sun in 2012.

Indonesia:

- Star of Mahaputera, 3rd Class (Indonesian: Bintang Mahaputera Utama)
- Military Distinguished Service Star (Indonesian: Bintang Dharma)
- Guerrilla Star (Indonesian: Bintang Gerilya)
- Star of Yudha Dharma, 2nd Class (Indonesian: Bintang Yudha Dharma Pratama)
- Star of Kartika Eka Paksi, 2nd Class (Indonesian: Bintang Kartika Eka Paksi Pratama)
- Star of Kartika Eka Paksi, 3rd Class (Indonesian: Bintang Kartika Eka Paksi Nararya)
- Star of Jalasena, 3rd Class (Indonesian: Bintang Jalasena Nararya)
- Star of Swa Bhuwana Paksa, 3rd Class (Indonesian: Bintang Swa Bhuwana Paksa Nararya)
- Star of Bhayangkara, 2nd Class (Indonesian: Bintang Bhayangkara Pratama)
- Military Long Service Medals, 2nd Category (Indonesian: Satyalancana Kesetiaan 24 Tahun)
- Independence War Medal I (Indonesian: Satyalancana Perang Kemerdekaan I)
- Independence War Medal II (Indonesian: Satyalancana Perang Kemerdekaan II)
- Military Operational Service Medal I (Indonesian: Satyalancana Gerakan Operasi Militer I)
- Military Operational Service Medal V (Indonesian: Satyalancana Gerakan Operasi Militer V)
- Military Operational Service Medal VI (Indonesian: Satyalancana Gerakan Operasi Militer VI)

Japan:

- Order of the Rising Sun, Gold And Silver Star

== Dates of rank ==
Officer cadet	24 November 1945
Second lieutenant	28 November 1948
First lieutenant	12 April 1950
Captain	1 July 1954
Major	1 July 1960
Lieutenant colonel	1 July 1962
Colonel	1 July 1965
Brigadier general	1 November 1966
Major general	1 October 1970
Lieutenant general	1 December 1973

== Bibliography ==
- Sutherland, Heather (April 1974), "Notes on Java's Regent Families: Part II" (PDF), Indonesia, 17 (17), Cornell University Southeast Asia Program: 1–42, doi:10.2307/3350770, hdl:1813/53573, JSTOR 3350770
- General Elections Institution (1977), Ringkasan riwayat hidup dan riwayat perjuangan anggota Majelis Permusyawaratan Rakyat hasil pemilihan umum tahun 1977 [Summary of Biography and Career of Members of the People's Consultative Assembly from the 1977 General Elections] (in Indonesian), Jakarta, archived from the original on 15 December 2020
- Moehkardi (7 August 2019), Akademi Militer Yogya dalam Perjuangan Fisik 1945 sampai dengan 1949, Gadjah Mada University, ISBN 978-602-386-416-4
- Indonesian Army Bureau of History (1981), Sejarah TNI-AD 1945—1973: Riwayat Hidup Singkat Pimpinan Tentara Nasional Indonesia Angkatan Darat, vol. XIII
- "Current Data on the Indonesian Army Elite", Indonesia (7), April 1969
- Anderson, Benedict R; Kahin, Audrey (April 1983). "Indonesian Army Territorial Commanders 1950 – March 1983". Indonesia. 35 – via eCommons.
- Sayidiman Suryohadiprojo (1997), Mengabdi negara sebagai prajurit TNI: sebuah otobiografi, Jakarta: Pustaka Sinar Harapan, ISBN 9789794164402
- Lesmana, Tjipta (17 January 2013), Dari Soekarno Sampai SBY: Intrik dan Lobi Politik Para Penguasa [From Suharto to SBY: Intrigues and Political Lobbies of the Rulers], Gramedia Pustaka Utama, ISBN 978-602-03-4980-0
- Rinakit, Sukardi (2005), The Indonesian Military After the New Order, NIAS Press, ISBN 978-87-91114-06-9
