= Lundu District =

Lundu
- District
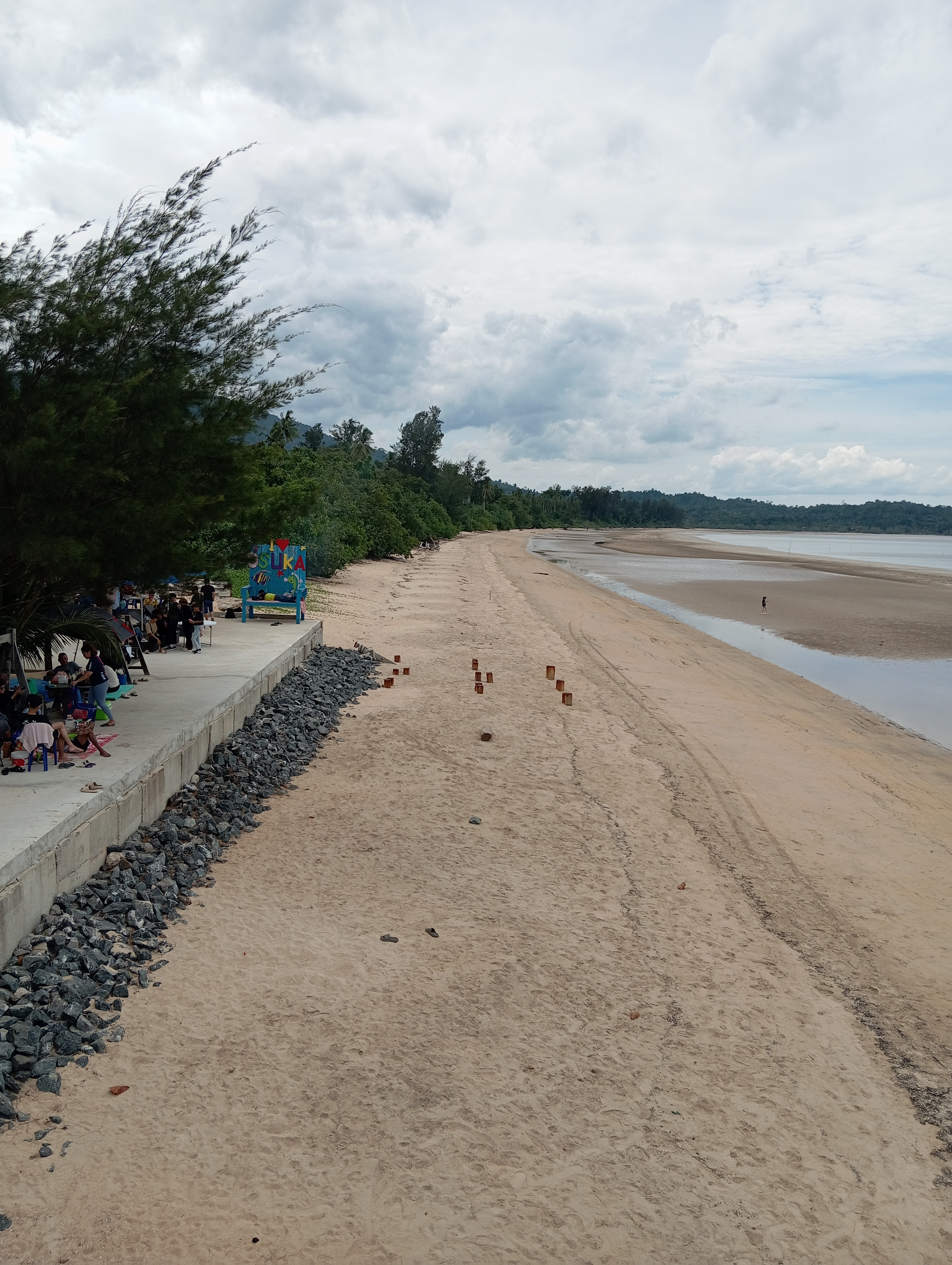
- Osuka Beach
- Interactive map of Lundu
- Country: Malaysia
- State: Sarawak

Population (2025)
  - Total: 46,187

Map of Lundu District

Lundu is a district, in Kuching Division, Sarawak, Malaysia. It is divided into Sematan subdistrict and Lundu, its district seat.

== List of attractions ==
- Tanjung Datu National Park, Lundu - Westernmost tip of Sarawak
- Gunung Gading National Park - Home to the Rafflesia
- Pandan Beach, Lundu
- Kuala Blungei Beach, Lundu
- Pugu Beach (Pantai Pugu), Lundu
- Sematan Beach (Abang Amin Beach, Sungai Kilong Beach, and Pueh Beach (Pantai Pueh))
- Samunsam Wildlife Sanctuary
- Union YES Retreat and Training Centre @ Siar, Lundu
- Siar Beach Resort, Lundu
- Siar Beach (Pantai Siar), Lundu
- Sampadi Island, Lundu
- Pulau Talang-Talang, Lundu
- Rambungan Beach
- Sebako Hot Spring
- Sebako Waterfall, Lundu
- Jangkar Waterfall, Lundu
- Mancal Tengah Waterfall, Lundu
- Temaga Dayak Waterfall (Lundu Hidden Waterfall), Sematan, Lundu
- Pueh Longhouse Homestay (Salako ethnic)
- Kangka Longhouse Homestay (Iban ethnic)
- Sematan Palm Beach Resort, Sematan, Lundu
- Seaside Paradise, Sematan
- Raffles Resort & Spa, Sematan, Lundu (under construction)
- ROXY Sematan Villa & Townhouse, Sematan, Lundu
- ROXY Beach Apartment, Sematan, Lundu
- ROXY Teluk Serabang Resort, Teluk Melano, Sematan
- Teluk Serabang Beach (Pantai Teluk Serabang), Sematan
- Telok Melano Beach (Pantai Teluk Melano), Sematan
- Kampung Teluk Melano, Teluk Melano, Sematan
