= Bong Kee Chok =

Malaysian political activist (1937–2023)

- 黄纪作

Secretary of the Second Bureau of the Central Committee of the North Kalimantan Communist Party
- In office 19 September 1965 – 20 October 1973
- Chairman: Wen Ming Chyuan
- Preceded by: office established
- Succeeded by: Ang Cho Teng

Commander-in-Chief of the North Kalimantan People's Army
- In office 26 October 1965 – 20 October 1973
- Preceded by: office established
- Succeeded by: Ang Cho Teng

Member of the Central Executive Committee of the Sarawak United People's Party
- In office 4 June 1959 – 22 June 1962

Personal details
- Born: 4 October 1937 Kuching, Raj of Sarawak
- Died: 6 February 2023 (aged 85) Sibu, Sarawak, Malaysia
- Resting place: Chinese Cemetery, 26th Mile, Jalan Kuching-Serian
- Party: North Kalimantan Communist Party
- Other political affiliations: Sarawak Liberation League (1953–1965) Sarawak United Peoples' Party (1959–1962)
- Education: Chung Hua Middle School

Chinese name
- Simplified Chinese: 黄纪作
- Traditional Chinese: 黃紀作
- Hanyu Pinyin: Huáng Jìzuò

Bong Kee Chok (黄紀作; 4 October 1937 – 6 February 2023) was a Malaysian communist politician who was the main leader of the North Kalimantan Communist Party (NKCP).

== Revolutionary activities ==
As Bong was opposed to the formation of Malaysia, he was arrested on 22 June 1962. After his release, Bong formed the NKCP on 19 September 1965 in Pontianak, West Kalimantan, Indonesia.

On September 19, 1971, the North Kalimantan Communist Party (NKCP) was formally established, with Wen Ming Chyuan as the chairman of the Central Committee. Under the Central Committee, there were the First and Second Central Bureaus: The Secretary of the First Bureau was Lam Wah Kwai (林和贵), who was responsible for the work in the western part of Sarawak. The Secretary of the Second Bureau Bong Kee Chok, was responsible for the work in the eastern part of Sarawak.

On 27 May 1972, Bong led a small group of cadre and a team of self-defense force from Second Division of Sarawak Sri Aman Division to a communist base at Samarahan Division to attend a central committee meeting.

== Peace agreement with the Sarawak government ==
Bong wrote a letter on 10 October 1973 to Sarawak chief minister Abdul Rahman Ya'kub and deputy chief minister of Sarawak Stephen Yong, expressing the wish to initiate a peace process in Sarawak. Bong sent Huang Ji Quan (黄紀权) as a representative to arrange for peace talk. Abdul Rahman received the letter on 13 October 1973 while he was admitted to Kuching General Hospital. Abdul Rahman made a friendly reply to Bong. Peace talks were taken place at Simanggang Divisional Office (now Sri Aman Divisional Office) from 19 October 1973 to 21 October 1973. A Memorandum of understanding (MoU) was signed on the last day of the negotiation. Among the items agreed in the MoU were: after the NKCP members reintegrate into the society, they would regain their citizenship status if they were citizens of Malaysia before this. If an NKCP member was an Indonesian citizen, he would gain permanent resident (PR) instead. The citizenship or the PR application process would be similar to other ordinary citizens, without reporting or confessing to the political department. NKCP members would destroy all the weapons and ammunition under the supervision of both parties. The decision for Bong to initiate peace talks had shocked his communist comrades.

Bong, in a letter written to Huang Ji Xiao (黄纪晓), the Deputy Secretary of the First Bureau on 21 October 1973, mentioned that such peace talk was not just an expedient measure, it was decided after evaluating the whole situation. The peace agreement was to end the 10-year armed struggle that is unlikely to be won. The communists were increasingly isolated from the public. Larger failures will result if the ways of struggle are not changed. The MoU had met the minimum requirements of the communist members (reintegration into the society without surrender or humiliation). Bong was well aware that he would be accused of capitulationism or right opportunism if he brought his communist faction for peace talks with the government. Bong also explained that while the respective units were scattered throughout Sarawak, it was difficult to get a common opinion. Therefore, he chose to negotiate with the government first before dealing with his respective units.

An analysis by Huang Ji Xiao and his comrades later found that the majority of the Chinese in Sarawak did not support armed insurrection, not to mention the natives in Sarawak. Initially, the natives at the Sarawak-Kalimantan border may have supported the communist activities, but later went and supported the government forces after brutal and cruel tactics used by the government forces. Besides, no significant result was achieved in the first division of Sarawak after years of struggle. A revolutionary base in Kalimantan was not possible after the crackdown of the communists by the Indonesian president Suharto. Such a situation had caused limited food provision and the number of recruits to fight a protracted guerilla war. While the minority population sympathetic to the revolutionary causes may be enough to ensure the survival of the communists, but further expansion of the revolutionary causes would be impossible without increasing the grassroots movements. Inadequate expansion would mean it was impossible to win the guerilla warfare. Therefore, the 1962 decision to start the armed insurrection was a mistake. Huang also respected the decision by Wen Ming Chyuan faction to continue armed insurrection against the Sarawak government. Wen advocated the mobilisation of the rural people to gather strength and wait for the opportunity for a decisive victory. Huang later informed the peace agreement process to Lam Wah Kwai who was leading the First Bureau. Lam decided that the majority of the comrades would reintegrate into the society while 52 people would continue the guerilla warfare. The Second Bureau led by Bong also made a similar decision of leaving a minority of the comrades in the guerilla warfare.

On 4 March 1974, Abdul Rahman Ya'kub and Stephen Yong formally announced the MoU in Kuching.

== Aftermath ==
After the Sri Aman treaty was signed, the local population, especially the people of the town of Simanggang (known as Sri Aman from 1974 to 2019) generally held a skeptical attitude towards Bong, accusing him of collaborating with the government for material wealth. Bong also retreated from the public view since then.

In 2014, Bong paid a visit to a former head of Special Branch Sarawak during Hari Raya celebration, Dato Sri Alli Kawi, 40 years after they met for a peace talk on 20 October 1973.

== Personal life ==
After laying down his arms, Bong worked as a rubber tapper, and a hawker, sold insurance, and later started a pig-rearing business.

Bong's wife died in 2019.

Bong suffered a stroke in April 2022.

== Death ==
Bong died in his sleep at 6 am on 7 February 2023 at his own residence. He had four children.
