= North Kalimantan Communist Party =

- Chinese name: 北加里曼丹共產黨; Běi Jiālǐmàndān Gòngchǎndǎng
- Malay name: Parti Komunis Kalimantan Utara
- Abbreviation: NKCP
- Chairperson: Wen Ming Chyuan
- Founded: 19 September 1965 (de facto); 19 September 1971 (de jure)
- Dissolved: 17 October 1990
- Youth wing: Sarawak Advance Youths' Association (SAYA)
- Paramilitary wing: Sarawak People's Guerrilla Force (SPGF); North Kalimantan People's Army (NKPA/Paraku)
- Ideology: Communism; Marxism–Leninism; Mao Zedong Thought; Anti-imperialism
- Political position: Far-left
- Colours: Red

Party flag

The North Kalimantan Communist Party (abbr. NKCP) was a Maoist communist party based in the Malaysian state of Sarawak in northern Borneo. It was formally founded on 19 September 1971. Before that, the group had been operating under the name Sarawak People's Guerrillas. The chairman of the NKCP was Wen Ming Chyuan and the party enjoyed close links with the People's Republic of China. The NKCP's membership was predominantly ethnically Chinese. The two military formations of the NKCP were the Sarawak People's Guerrilla Force (SPGF) or Pasukan Gerilya Rakyat Sarawak (PGRS), and the North Kalimantan People's Army (NKPA) or the Pasukan Rakyat Kalimantan Utara (PARAKU). The NKCP participated in the Sarawak Communist Insurgency (1962–1990). On 17 October 1990, the North Kalimantan Communist Party signed a peace agreement with the Sarawak state government, formally ending the Sarawak Communist Insurgency.

== Name ==
The organisation was initially referred to by its members as the Sarawak Communist Movement and subsequently the North Kalimantan Communist Party after 1970. Documents published by the Sarawak colonial and Malaysian governments tended to label any anti-colonial group operating in Sarawak as either the Sarawak Communist Organisation (SCO) or the Clandestine Communist Organisation (CCO). Due to the Cold War atmosphere, anti-colonial groups and left-leaning individuals were often categorised as Communists by the authorities. According to the Japanese academic Fujio Hara, the NKCP's two main military formations were the Sarawak People's Guerrilla Force (SPGF) or Pasukan Gerilya Rakyat Sarawak (PGRS), and the North Kalimantan People's Army (NKPA) or the Pasukan Rakyat Kalimantan Utara (PARAKU). The SPGF operated in western Sarawak while the NKPA operated in eastern Sarawak. In addition, the main component organisations were the Sarawak Liberation League (SLL), the Sarawak Advance Youths' Association (SAYA), and the NKPA.

== History ==
=== Origins ===
According to Hong-Kah Fong, the North Kalimantan Communist Party was officially formed on 30 March 1970. However, 19 September 1971 was selected as the official commemoration date in order to commemorate the Pontianak Conference of 17–19 September 1965, which is regarded as the birth date of the Sarawak Communist Movement. The NKCP traces its origins to local Chinese Communists who had migrated from China to Sabah during the 1930s and 1940s. The NKCP was also preceded by several Communist movements including the Races Liberation Front and the Borneo Anti-Japanese League (which consisted of two organisations: the North Borneo Anti Japanese League and the West Borneo Anti-Japanese League), which had resisted the Japanese occupation during World War II.

During the post-war period, other communist groups active in Sarawak included the Overseas Chinese Youth Association, the Liberation League, and the Sarawak Advanced Youths' Association (SAYA). By 1965, these had coalesced into two main organisations: the North Kalimantan People's Army (Pasukan Rakyat Kalimantan Utara, PARAKU) and the Sarawak People's Guerrillas (Pasukan Gerilya Rakyat Sarawak, PGRS). These were collectively referred to by most British and Western sources as the Sarawak Communist Movement or Clandestine Communist Organisation (CCO), which came into existence during the Pontianak Conference in September 1965.

According to the historians Vernon L. Porritt and Cheah Boon Kheng, Communist elements were also influential in the Chinese schools during the 1940s. Following the Second World War, Communist elements also infiltrated the Sarawak labour movement and Sarawak's first political party, the predominantly ethnic Chinese Sarawak United People's Party, which was formed in June 1959. In addition, leftist study groups were formed in Kuching between 1949 and 1950. Two important figures in the Sarawak Communist movement, Weng Min Chyuan and Bong Kee Chok, came from Chung Hua Middle School. On 30 March 1954, pro-Communist students at Kuching Chung Hua Middle School organised a 47-day strike to protest against the school administration's teaching methods and its expulsion of students. Communist elements later spread to the business and farming community, many of whom were parents of these left-wing students.

=== Opposition to Malaysia ===
The Sarawak Communist Movement was also opposed to the formation of Malaysia, a new political federation which had been created by the British to merge their former Southeast Asian territories of Malaya, Singapore, Sarawak, and British North Borneo. Instead, the Sarawak Communists supported and propagated the unification of all Borneo territories under British control to form an independent leftist North Kalimantan state. This idea had originally proposed by A. M. Azahari, leader of the Parti Rakyat Brunei (Brunei People's Party), who had forged links with Sukarno's nationalist movement, together with Ahmad Zaidi, in Java in the 1940s. The North Kalimantan (or Kalimantan Utara) proposal was seen as a post-decolonisation alternative by local opposition against the Malaysia plan. Local opposition throughout the Borneo territories was primarily based on economic, political, historical and cultural differences between the Borneo states and Malaya, as well as the refusal to be subjected to peninsular political domination.

According to a British government white paper known as "The Communist Threat to Sarawak", the so-called "Clandestine Communist Organisation" had infiltrated the Chinese-language media, trade unions, and had taken over the SUPP. Following the defeat of the Brunei Revolt in 1962, the British authorities in British Borneo, in cooperation with the Malaysian Special Branch, launched a crackdown of suspected Communists which prompted 700–800 Chinese youths to flee to Indonesian Kalimantan. These guerrillas would form the core of the North Kalimantan Communist Party's two guerrilla formations: the Sarawak People's Guerrillas (Pasukan Gerilya Rakyat Sarawak, PGRS) and the North Kalimantan People's Army (Pasakan Rakyat Kalimantan Utara, PARAKU).

Flag of the Sarawak People's Guerrilla Force, a paramilitary wing of the party

The Sarawak People's Guerrilla Force was formed on 30 March 1964 at Gunung Asuansang in West Kalimantan with the assistance of the Indonesian Ministry of Foreign Affairs. The PGRS's leaders included Bong Kee Chok, Yang Chu Chung, and Wen Ming Chyuan. According to Conboy, the PGRS numbered about 800 and was based in West Kalimantan at Batu Hitam, with a contingent of 120 from the Indonesian intelligence agency and a small cadre trained in China. The Indonesian Communist Party was also present and was led by an ethnic Arab revolutionary, Sofyan. The PGRS ran some raids into Sarawak but spent more time developing their supporters in Sarawak. The Indonesian armed forces did not approve of the leftist nature of the PGRS and generally avoided them.

According to the former British soldier and writer Will Fowler, these Sarawak Communists received military-style training at Indonesian camps. At that time, President Sukarno was pro-Communist and anti-Western. As with Sukarno and the Communist Party of Indonesia (PKI), the Sarawak Communists opposed the newly formed Federation of Malaysia as a "neo-colonialist conspiracy" and supported the unification of all former British territories in Borneo to create an independent leftist North Kalimantan state. In addition, the Sarawak Communists had plans to launch attacks on police stations and to ambush security forces, paralleling similar tactics used by the Malayan National Liberation Army during the Malayan Emergency.

Meanwhile, the North Kalimantan People's Army was formed by Bong Kee Chok near Sungai Melawi in West Kalimantan with the assistance of the PKI on 26 October 1965. While the SPGF under its commander Yang operated in western Sarawak, the NKPA operated in eastern Sarawak. The NKPA was initially commanded by Lam Wah Kwai, who was succeeded by Bong Kee Chok. According to Kenneth Conboy, Soebandrio met with a group of Sarawak Communist leaders in Bogor, and Nasution sent three trainers from Resimen Para Komando Angkatan Darat (RPKAD) Battalion 2 to Nangabadan near the Sarawak border, where there were about 300 trainees. Some three months later, two lieutenants were also sent there.

The Indonesians had planned to use the Sarawak Communists as an indigenous front for their operations during the Indonesian-Malaysian Confrontation. To support this ruse, they even formed a separate organisation named the North Kalimantan National Army (TNKU), to link the Sarawak Communists to the original Bruneian rebels. While the first raids included SCO members, they were often led by regular Indonesian officers or Non-commissioned officers from the Marine commandos (Korps Komando Operasi, KKO), the Army para-commandos (Regimen Para Kommando Angaton Darat, RPKAD), and the Air Force paratroopers ( Pasukan Gerak Tjepat, PGT).

Following the 1965 failed coup, and subsequently, the military takeover in Indonesia, General Suharto launched a purge of Communist elements. Overnight, the Sarawak Communists in Indonesia lost a safe haven and the Indonesian military would subsequently cooperate with the Malaysians in counter-insurgency operations against their former allies. Despite the loss of an important ally, PARAKU and the PGRS continued fighting against the Malaysian government during the Sarawak Communist Insurgency which lasted until November 1990.

=== Decline and fragmentation ===
Between 1965 and 1990, there were skirmishes which pitted the Sarawak Communist Movement against the Malaysian armed forces. In response to the Communist insurgency, the Malaysian federal government created several "controlled areas" along the Kuching–Serian road in Sarawak's First and Third Divisions in 1965. These settlements were protected by barbed wire and modelled after the successful New Villages used earlier during the Malayan Emergency. As with the Briggs Plan, the "controlled areas" succeeded in denying the SCO access to food supplies and material from their Chinese and Dayak supporters. Following the 13 May Incident in 1969, all Communist elements were expelled from the SUPP and moderate elements gained control over the party. The SUPP then entered into a coalition with the ruling Bumiputera Party in the Sarawak State Legislative Assembly.

On 30 March 1970, Wen Ming Chyuan, the Head of the Sarawak People's Guerrillas in Sarawak's First Division, formed the North Kalimantan Communist Party. However, 19 September 1971 was chosen as the official date of the formation of the party to coincide with the Pontianak Conference, which had been held on 17–19 September 1965. While the Pontianak Conference was regarded as the foundation of the Sarawak Communist Movement, none of the conference attendees were Communist. Instead, they consisted of members of the left-wing Liberation League and the "O Members" of the Advanced Youths Association. While they had discussed creating a Communist party in Sarawak, they delayed doing so until 1971 due to the tense political situation in Indonesia.

The Sarawak Chief Minister Abdul Rahman Ya'kub also made several overtures to the NKCP insurgents and managed to convince several of the insurgents to lay down their arms. In 1973–74, the Malaysian government scored a key victory when Rahman Ya'kub successfully convinced Bong Kee Chok, the Director and Commissar of the North Kalimantan People's Army, to sign a Memorandum of Understanding with the Sarawak government. Following this event, between 481 and 580 members of the North Kalimantan People's Army and the Sarawak People's Guerrillas surrendered and returned to society. This was a heavy loss for the Sarawak Communist Movement since this number comprised approximately 75 per cent of its entire force in Sarawak. After this defection, only 121 guerrilla fighters led by Hung Chu Ting and Wong Lian Kui remained. By 1974, the Communist insurgency had become confined to the Rejang Delta. Both sides sustained casualties and many civilians were also killed and wounded in the cross-fire.

Following the successful Hat Yai peace accords between the Malayan Communist Party and the Malaysian government in 1989, the remaining North Kalimantan Communist Party guerrillas decided to end their insurgency after one of their Chinese contacts Weng Min Chyuan convinced them to negotiate with the Sarawak state government. In July 1990, a series of negotiations between the NKCP and the Sarawak government took place at the town of Bintulu. By 17 October 1990, a peace agreement formally ending the Sarawak communist insurgency was ratified at Wisma Bapa Malaysia in the state capital Kuching. Shortly afterwards, the last remaining NKCP operatives led by Ang Cho Teng surrendered. These developments ended the Sarawak Communist insurgency.

== Leadership ==
=== Chairman of the North Kalimantan Communist Party ===
No	Name	Term start	Term end
1	Wen Ming Chyuan	19 September 1965	17 October 1990

=== Secretary of the First Bureau of the Central Committee of the North Kalimantan Communist Party ===
No	Name	Term start	Term end
1	Lam Wah Kwai	19 September 1965	20 October 1973
2	Cheung Ah Wah	21 October 1973	1 June 1986

=== Secretary of the Second Bureau of the Central Committee of the North Kalimantan Communist Party ===
No	Name	Term start	Term end
1	Bong Kee Chok	19 September 1965	20 October 1973
2	Ang Cho Teng	21 October 1973	17 October 1990
