= Petra Jaya State Mosque =

State mosque of Kuching, Sarawak, Malaysia

Sarawak State Jamek Mosque
- Masjid Jamek Negeri Sarawak
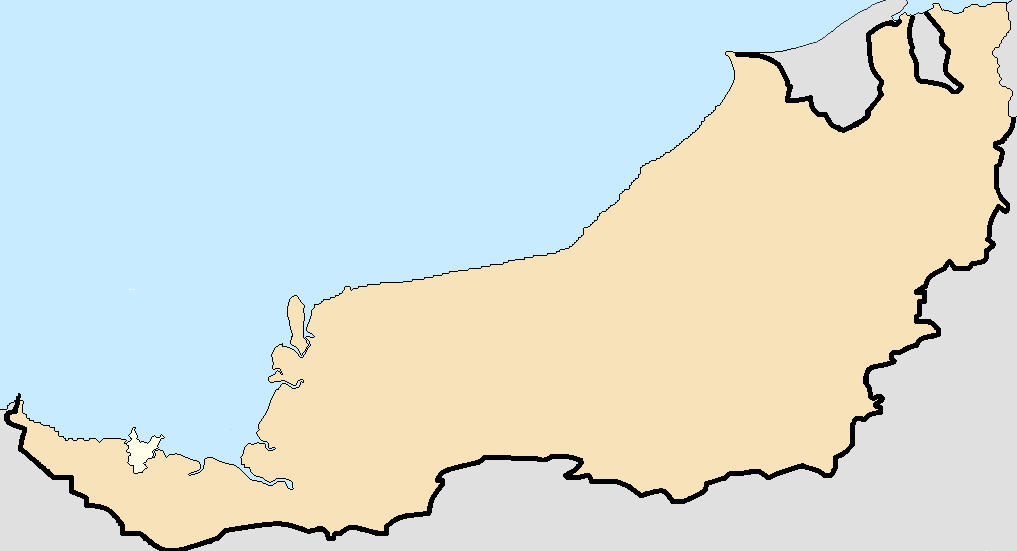
- Location within Kuching

Religion
- Affiliation: Islam
- Branch/tradition: Sunni
- Ownership: Lembaga Amanah Kebajikan Masjid Negeri Sarawak

Location
- Location: Kuching, Sarawak, Malaysia
- Interactive map of Sarawak State Jamek Mosque
- Coordinates: 1°34′53.3″N 110°20′35.3″E

Architecture
- Type: mosque
- Minaret: 1

Petra Jaya State Mosque (Malay: Masjid Negeri Petra Jaya), officially known as Masjid Jamek Negeri Sarawak is the state mosque of Sarawak, located in Petra Jaya, Kuching, Sarawak, Malaysia. It is also known as Jamek Mosque.

A special grade mosque, it is located on a 100 acres (40 ha) piece of land, and could accommodate 14,000 congregants.

== History ==
Construction of the mosque began in 1987 and completed in 1990. The mosque was opened by then Yang di-Pertua Negeri of Sarawak Ahmad Zaidi Adruce on 5 October 1990.

A renovation of the mosque as a new tourism product aimed to attract more Muslim tourists was announced in January 2024 with the model of the mosque revealed in July 2024. The renovation would be based on the Nabawi Mosque in Madinah, Saudi Arabia and the Hagia Sophia Mosque with the addition of six minarets: four main minarets of 75 metres in height and two small minarets of 65 metres in height. These minarets would have solar panels and low energy lamps. The project would start in 2025 and expected to be completed in 2027. Ahead of the renovation, the existing minaret was demolished between April and November 2024.

== Architecture ==
The mosque's architecture is inspired by the mosques in Istanbul. It has a main dome and 40 small domes. Its minaret, which is located separately from the mosque's building, is 99 metres tall, which represent the 99 names of Allah.

== See also ==
- Islam in Malaysia
