= Abang Muhammad Salahuddin =

Third and sixth Yang di-Pertua Negeri of Sarawak (1921–2022)

Yang Amat Berbahagia Tun Pehin Sri Abang Muhammad Salahuddin SMN SBS SPDK SPMP DUNM DUPN DP
- ابڠ محمد صلاح الدين بن ابڠ باريئڠ
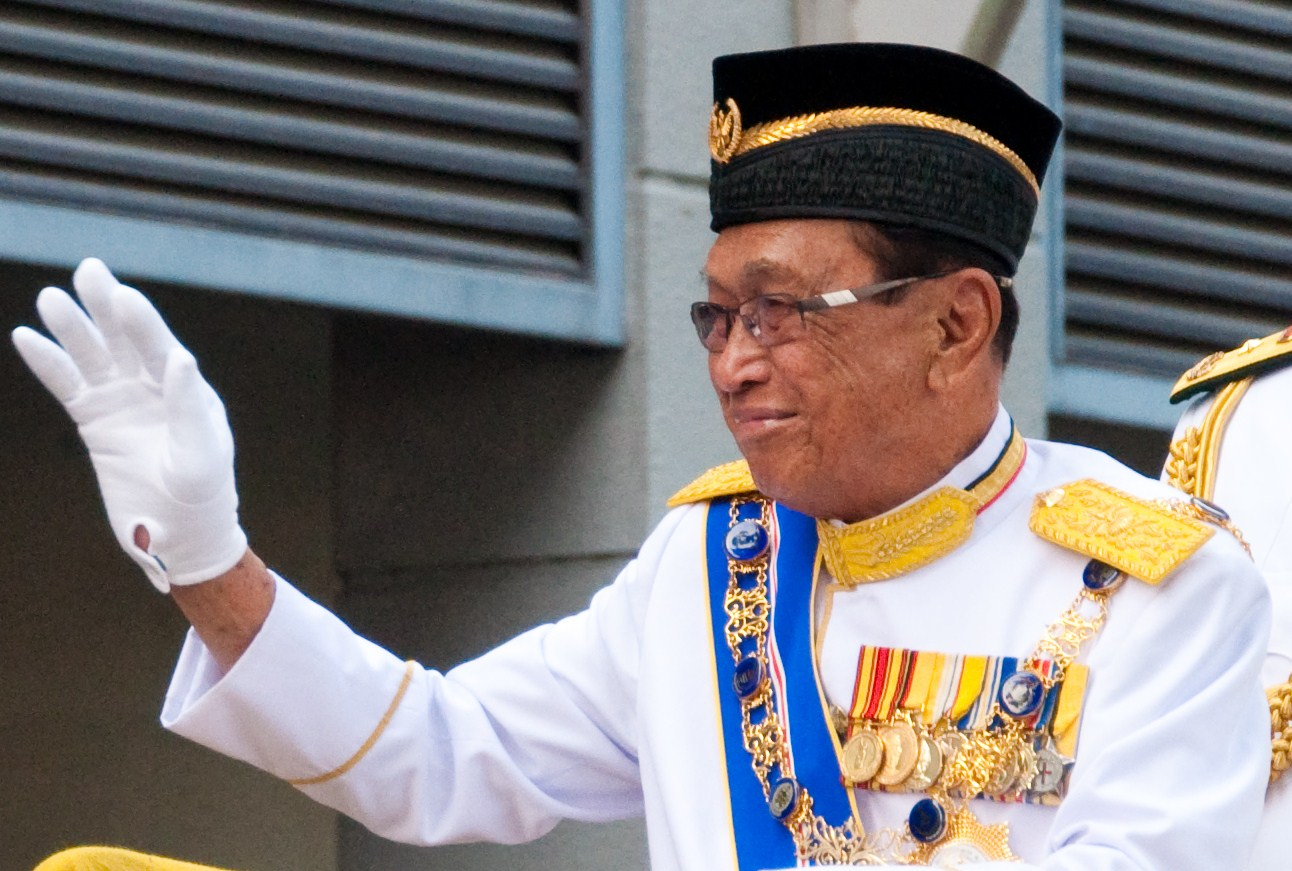
- Salahuddin in 2011

3rd and 6th Yang di-Pertua Negeri of Sarawak
- In office 22 February 2001 – 28 February 2014
- Chief Minister: Abdul Taib Mahmud
- Preceded by: Ahmad Zaidi Adruce
- Succeeded by: Abdul Taib Mahmud
- In office 2 April 1977 – 2 April 1981
- Chief Minister: Abdul Rahman Ya'kub; Abdul Taib Mahmud
- Preceded by: Tuanku Bujang
- Succeeded by: Abdul Rahman Ya'kub

Personal details
- Born: Louis anak Barieng; 27 August 1921 Sibu, Raj of Sarawak
- Died: 28 January 2022 (aged 100) Kuching, Sarawak, Malaysia
- Resting place: Samariang Muslim Cemetery
- Spouses: Dayang Umi Kalthum (died 1995) Norkiah Abdullah (m. 1996; died 2021)
- Children: 12
- Occupation: Politician

Abang Muhammad Salahuddin bin Abang Barieng (Note: Jawi: ابڠ محمد صلاح الدين بن ابڠ باريئڠ) (born Louis Barieng, 27 August 1921 – 28 January 2022) was a Malaysian politician who served as the third and sixth Yang di-Pertua Negeri of Sarawak from 1977 to 1981 and from 2001 to 2014. He was the first Yang di-Pertua Negeri to serve twice and the oldest to be appointed.

== Early life ==
Salahuddin was born with the name as Louis Barieng in 1921 at Kampung Nangka, a village in Sibu, Raj of Sarawak. He was the only son of Barieng Anyut, a well-known figure in the Third Division (present-day Sibu Division), who had a bloodline with the politician Jugah Barieng. Louis later changed his name to Abang Muhammad Salahuddin after his conversion to Islam.

After the Japanese occupation of British Borneo, he worked as Municipal Inspector until 1947 under the Crown Colony of Sarawak. He continued in the public service under the National Registration Department and the Public Works Department.

== Career ==
=== Politics ===
Salahuddin was active in state politics, helping to form Barisan Pemuda Sarawak (BPS) and Barisan Rakyat Jati Sarawak (BARJASA). He acted as representative of the Melanau community to the Cobbold Commission during the years preceding the formation of Malaysia.

In 1963, he contested and won a seat in the state elections. He resigned in 1968 and returned to public service and eventually became the chairman of the State Public Service Commission.

=== Governorship ===
In 1977, he was installed as the third Yang di-Pertua Negeri of Sarawak and served for his first term. In 2000, he became the acting Yang di-Pertua Negeri while his successor Ahmad Zaidi Adruce was ill. Ahmad Zaidi died in December 2000, and Abang Muhammad Salahuddin was reappointed permanently to the governorship in February 2001, and his term officially ended on 28 February 2014.

== Death ==
Salahuddin died at the Normah Sarawak Medical Centre in Petra Jaya, on 28 January 2022, at the age of 100. He was buried at the Samariang Muslim Cemetery in Kuching.

== Honours ==
=== Honours of Malaysia ===
- Malaysia
  - Grand Commander of the Order of the Defender of the Realm (SMN) – Tun (1978)
- Sarawak
  - Knight Grand Commander of the Most Exalted Order of the Star of Sarawak (SBS) – Pehin Sri (2017)
  - Knight Grand Commander of the Order of the Star of Hornbill Sarawak (DP) – Datuk Patinggi
  - Grand Master of the Order of Meritorious Service to Sarawak (JBS)
  - Grand Master of the Most Exalted Order of the Star of Sarawak (PPA)
- Malacca
  - Grand Commander of the Premier and Exalted Order of Malacca (DUNM) – Datuk Seri Utama
- Penang
  - Knight Grand Commander of the Order of the Defender of State (DUPN) – Dato' Seri Utama
- Perlis
  - Knight Grand Commander of the Order of the Crown of Perlis (SPMP) – Dato' Seri (1979)
- Sabah
  - Grand Commander of the Order of Kinabalu (SPDK) – Datuk Seri Panglima

== Notes ==
1. Who's who 82/83 (First Edition), Sarawak Publishing House Sdn.Bhd., Kuching, Malaysia.

Political offices
| Preceded by Tuanku Bujang Tuanku Othman | Yang di-Pertua Negeri Sarawak; 1977–1981 | Succeeded by Abdul Rahman Ya'kub |
| Preceded by Ahmad Zaidi Adruce | Yang di-Pertua Negeri Sarawak; 2001–2014 | Succeeded by Abdul Taib Mahmud |
