= Satria Pertiwi Complex =

Official residence and office of the Premier of Sarawak

General information
- Status: Completed
- Type: Government office
- Location: Jalan Tun Abdul Rahman Yaakub, Petra Jaya, Kuching, Sarawak, Malaysia
- Coordinates: 1.578579318°N 110.350249052°E
- Current tenants: Abang Johari, Premier of Sarawak
- Construction started: 2023
- Opened: 4 August 2025
- Owner: Government of Sarawak

Technical details
- Floor count: 3

Satria Pertiwi Complex (Malay:Kompleks Satria Pertiwi) is the official residence and office of the premier of Sarawak. It replaced Wisma Bapa Malaysia as the official seat of the Premier's Office and is located in Petra Jaya, Kuching. Owing to its white façade, monumental scale, and Neoclassical architectural style, the complex has been nicknamed the "White House of Sarawak" by local residents because of its resemblance to the White House.

The complex was officially inaugurated on 4 August 2025 by the eighth Governor of Sarawak, Wan Junaidi Tuanku Jaafar. The inauguration coincided with the 75th birthday of the Premier of Sarawak, Abang Johari Tun Openg.

== History ==
Construction of the complex began in January 2023 with the objective of establishing a secure and modern administrative centre for Sarawak's top leadership. The facility incorporates advanced security systems, modern digital infrastructure, and a government data centre.

Before relocating to the Satria Pertiwi Complex, the Premier's Office was housed at Wisma Bapa Malaysia, which had served as Sarawak's administrative headquarters since 1976. According to Premier Abang Johari Tun Openg, the previous office's accessibility to the public posed security challenges for the conduct of high-level government operations.

The relocation was intended to provide a more secure environment for managing confidential government documents, official records, blueprints, and other sensitive state information. The purpose-built 19.17-acre (7.76 ha) complex also supports Sarawak's digital transformation agenda through enhanced digital infrastructure and cybersecurity measures.

The complex centralises several government functions by integrating the Premier's Office, an official residence for visiting dignitaries, and a multi-purpose hall within a single high-security compound. This arrangement is intended to improve administrative efficiency, facilitate cabinet coordination, and minimise disruption arising from public access.

== Architecture ==
The architecture of the Satria Pertiwi Complex combines Neoclassical and Colonial architectural elements. Owing to its symmetrical layout, white façade, and monumental scale, the complex has been nicknamed the "White House of Sarawak" by local residents.

The design was intended to reflect Sarawak's architectural heritage while incorporating contemporary administrative and security requirements. According to the Sarawak government, the integration of classical architectural elements with local design features symbolises the state's multicultural society and unity.

The complex occupies a 19.17-acre (7.76 ha) site with a built-up area of approximately 146,000 square feet (13,600 m^{2}). Designed using Building Information Modelling (BIM) technology, it comprises four principal blocks, including a three-storey administrative building that houses the Premier's Office, cabinet meeting rooms, briefing facilities, official reception and dining rooms, and a public gallery.

The complex also includes an official residence for visiting dignitaries, staff accommodation, public service facilities, a surau, and a multi-purpose hall with a seating capacity of approximately 360 people.

The surau and multi-purpose hall incorporate Islamic geometric motifs and are equipped with modern audio-visual facilities.

== Guests ==
=== International guests ===
On 5 August 2025, Singapore's Minister for Manpower and Second Minister for Trade and Industry, Tan See Leng, became the first international dignitary to pay a courtesy visit to the Satria Pertiwi Complex following its inauguration the previous day.
