= Samariang Muslim Cemetery =

Cemetery in Kuching, Sarawak, Malaysia

- Interactive map of Samariang Muslim Cemetery

Details
- Established: 1977
- Location: Kampung Samariang, Petra Jaya, Kuching, Sarawak
- Country: Malaysia
- Coordinates: 1.6008°N 110.3365°E
- Type: Public Muslim cemetery
- Owned by: Dewan Bandaraya Kuching Utara (DBKU); Sarawak Islamic Religious Department (JAIS)
- Size: 62 acre
- No. of graves: >15,000 (2018)

The Samariang Muslim Cemetery (Tanah Perkuburan Islam Semariang) is the largest Muslim cemetery in Kuching city, Sarawak, Malaysia. It is located near Kampung Samariang, Petra Jaya. It is the final resting place of many prominent Malay Sarawakian personalities.

== Notable burials ==
- Juma’ani Tuanku Bujang – Wife of Sarawak's first Premier, Abang Johari Openg
- Dayang Rosnah Abang Madeli – Mother of Deputy Prime Minister of Malaysia, Fadillah Yusof
- Adenan Satem – 5th Chief Minister of Sarawak (2014–2017)
- Abang Muhammad Salahuddin 3rd and 6th Yang di-Pertua Negeri (Governor) of Sarawak (1977–1981, 2001–2014)
- Puan Norkiah @ Rokiah Bagong, Wife of Sarawak's former Governor Abang Muhammad Salahuddin
- Abdul Rahman Ya'kub – former Fourth Yang di-Pertua Negeri (Governor) of Sarawak (1981–1985)
- Ahmad Zaidi Adruce – Fifth Yang di-Pertua Negeri (Governor) of Sarawak (1985–2000)
- Bujang Ulis @ Bujang Hadziri – Former Deputy Minister of Education
- Bujang Taha – Bodybuilder and two-time winner of Mr Asia
- Daud Abdul Rahman – Former Tupong assemblyman
- Sulaiman Daudd – Former Minister of Agriculture
- Suratinan Tamin (also known as Soloman Esmanto) – First Malaysian bodybuilder to win the Mr Asia title in 1969

=== Notable burials ===
- Victims of the Malaysia Airlines MH17 crash on 17 July 2014
  - Tambi Jiee (father)
  - Ariza Ghazalee (mother)
  - Muhammad Afif Tambi (son)
  - Muhammad Afzal Tambi (son)
  - Marsha Azmeena Tambi (daughter)
  - Muhammad Afruz Tambi (son)
