= Petra Jaya National Secondary School =

- Sekolah Menengah Kebangsaan Petra Jaya
- Petra Jaya; Kuching, Sarawak; Malaysia

Information
- Type: Public secondary school
- Motto: Malay: Belajar, Berdisiplin, Berbakti, lit. 'Learning, Discipline, Devotion'
- Established: 1980
- Principal: Khasim Bin Ibrahim (5 December 2017 -)
- Website: khalifaha.wix.com/pibgsmkpj

Petra Jaya National Secondary School (Malay: Sekolah Menengah Kebangsaan Petra Jaya) is a public secondary school in Kuching, the capital of the East Malaysian state of Sarawak. As of 2015, the school has approximately 106 academic staffs and approximately 18 non-academic staffs. This school holds students from Peralihan to Form 6.

== History ==
The construction of SMK Petra Jaya began on 16 June 1980. The school initially operated as a temporary building at SRK Encik Buyong in January 1981. During early 1982, SMK Petra Jaya moved to its new building that built on a 12.07-acre site.

In 17 August 1982, the grand opening of SMK Petra Jaya was officiated by the Pemangku Tuan Yang Terutama of Sarawak, Datuk Amar Abang Haji Marzuki Nor (Tuesday).

Initially, SMK Petra Jaya only accommodated 552 lower secondary students, majorly Malays, with a teaching staff of 21. The first principal that led SMK Petra Jaya was Ahmad Bin Sabu. By 2005, the student population had increased to 1,631, accompanied by 85 teachers and 16 supporting staffs.

On 17 August 2005, SMK Petra Jaya celebrated its Silver Jubilee that officiated by Datin Hajjah Fatimah Binti Abdullah, an Assistant Minister in the Chief Minister’s Office that was responsible for Human Resources and Training, and Assistant Minister of Agriculture, who was also a former principal of SMK Petra Jaya.

SMK Petra Jaya began operating as a single-session morning school since 2003. In 2008, two lower form six classes were introduced.
