= Ahmad Zaidi Adruce =

Fifth Yang di-Pertua Negeri of Sarawak

Yang Amat Berbahagia Tun Datuk Patinggi Ahmad Zaidi Adruce Muhammed Noor SMN SSM DP SPMS SPMK SSMT DUPN SPDK DUNM PNBS PSLJ
- أحمد زيدي أدرس محمد نور
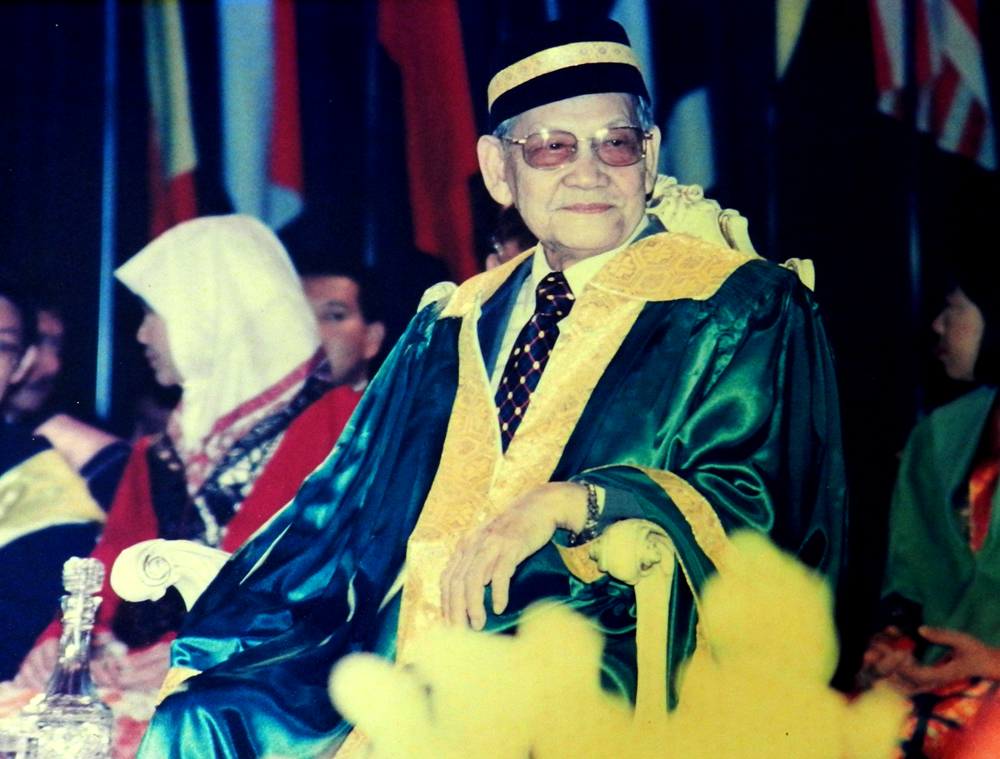
- Ahmad Zaidi Adruce in university convocation

5th Yang di-Pertua Negeri of Sarawak
- In office 2 April 1985 – 5 December 2000
- Chief Minister: Abdul Taib Mahmud
- Preceded by: Abdul Rahman Ya'kub
- Succeeded by: Abang Muhammad Salahuddin

Personal details
- Born: 29 March 1924 Sibu, Kingdom of Sarawak
- Died: 5 December 2000 (aged 76) Subang Jaya, Selangor, Malaysia
- Resting place: Samariang Muslim Cemetery, Kuching, Malaysia
- Party: Parti Pesaka Bumiputera Bersatu (until 1985)
- Spouse(s): Hamsiah Ismail (deceased); Rosmiati Kendati
- Children: 12
- Education: Anglo-Chinese School; Sultan Idris Training College
- Alma mater: Robert Gordon University; University of Edinburgh; University of London
- Occupation: Politician, educator
- Profession: Teacher, lecturer

Ahmad Zaidi Adruce bin Muhammed Noor (Jawi: أحمد زيدي أدروس بن محمد نور; 29 March 1924 – 5 December 2000) was a Malaysian politician, statesman, educator and nationalist who served as the fifth Yang di-Pertua Negeri (Governor) of Sarawak. He was the longest-serving governor in Sarawak's history, holding office from 1985 until his death in 2000. He is also remembered as the first Sarawakian bumiputera to earn a Master of Arts degree from a British university, the University of Edinburgh.

== Early life and education ==
Ahmad Zaidi Adruce bin Muhammed Noor was born on 29 March 1924 in Kampung Semop, near the Rajang River in central Sarawak, to Mohammad Noor and Siti Saadiah. His father was a farmer, while his mother was a housewife. He received a "relatively good" education for a native of Sarawak under British colonial rule.

During his early life, Ahmad Zaidi was adopted by descendants of the prominent Malay nobleman, Syarif Masahor. Sharifah Mai, a daughter of Syarif Masahor, had an unmarried daughter named Sharifah Dayang Aisah, who later adopted Ahmad Zaidi. Sharifah Mai also had a childless son, Wan Abu Bakar Adruce.

At the age of five, Ahmad Zaidi Adruce was enrolled in two schools in Sibu: Chung Hua Primary School and Abang Ali Primary School. It was during this time that he developed an interest in poetry, gymnastics, and acting. At the age of 12, he passed his Standard Seven examination with "exemplary marks" — an exceptional achievement for a young man born and raised in Sarawak. Ahmad Zaidi was an outstanding student, consistently placing either first or second in his class throughout his primary and secondary education.

Following his Standard Seven examination, Ahmad Zaidi Adruce moved to Kuching in 1936 to continue his studies at St. Thomas School, where he graduated with a Junior Cambridge qualification in 1938. Out of a class of 63 students, he was among only seven who passed — and the only bumiputera among them. He later attended the Anglo-Chinese School in Singapore in 1938 and graduated in 1939, at the age of 15, with a Cambridge School Certificate, becoming the only bumiputera to attain such a distinction at the time.

In November 1940, Ahmad Zaidi Adruce enrolled at Sultan Idris Training College in Tanjung Malim, Perak (now Universiti Pendidikan Sultan Idris). He studied there until the Japanese invasion in 1941 forced him to flee to Singapore. In 1942, he was sent to Java to study veterinary medicine at Buitenzorg College in Bogor. However, his studies were disrupted by the end of the Second World War and the subsequent political upheaval in Indonesia. Despite these challenges, he remained in Java and aligned himself with Indonesian republicans after the Dutch returned to reassert colonial control.

Between 1946 and 1947, Ahmad Zaidi Adruce became actively involved in the Indonesian National Revolution. He joined the Indonesian Navy's 4th Base (Pangkalan IV Angkatan Laut Republik Indonesia or ALRI) based in Mojokerto, East Java. He was appointed as a captain and served as head of the Special Operations Intelligence (SOI) unit.

Ahmad Zaidi Adruce played a key role in covert military operations, which included espionage, infiltration, and logistical missions. His knowledge of Kalimantan's geography and its people made him "a valuable asset" to Indonesian forces seeking to gain control in areas where Dutch colonial influence remained strong. He was also instrumental in recruiting local youths from Kalimantan, contributing to the formation of the ALRI Secret Battalion (Batalyon Rahasia ALRI).

One of his most important missions was in 1947 when he infiltrated the town of Ketapang to gather intelligence and coordinate resistance against the Dutch colonial authority, known as the Nederlandsch-Indië Civil Administratie (NICA). His contributions during this time were later recognised by General Zaini Azhar Maulani of the Indonesian Army, who credited Ahmad Zaidi Adruce as a key figure in the early development of Kodam VI/Tanjungpura, the regional military command for Kalimantan.

In 1947, Ahmad Zaidi Adruce returned to Sarawak, where he was appointed a teacher at the Batu Lintang training centre. That same year, he founded the first Sea Scout movement in Borneo, taking his students on sailing expeditions as far as Tanjung Datu on the western tip of Borneo Island and as far north as the Saribas River. This experience later enabled him to establish an intelligence and underground movement in support of Indonesia's guerrilla efforts against Dutch forces.

In 1949, the British government awarded Ahmad Zaidi Adruce a four-year colonial development and welfare scholarship to further his studies. He attended Robert Gordon's Technical College in Aberdeen before enrolling at the University of Edinburgh. On 28 May 1953, he represented Sarawakian students at the coronation of Queen Elizabeth II, where he also met with Jugah Barieng. In the same year, he obtained an Master of Arts degree in political economy from the University of Edinburgh and subsequently earned a Certificate in Education from the University of London in 1955.

Upon returning to Sarawak, Ahmad Zaidi Adruce was promoted to the position of supervisor at a training college. In 1956, he became the acting president of Barisan Pemuda Sarawak, an organisation dedicated to uniting the bumiputera population in the pursuit of Sarawak's independence from Britain. During this period, he met with Ghazali Shafie and later with Tunku Abdul Rahman to express his support for the formation of Malaysia.

== Early political career ==
Ahmad Zaidi Adruce had a turbulent political career. His involvement in politics began in earnest while he was studying at Buitenzorg College (Current Bogor Agricultural University) in Bogor, then Japanese-occupied Netherlands East Indies (present-day Indonesia).

Ahmad Zaidi was opposed to colonialist ideology, and the experiences of being discriminated while in the United Kingdom did little to endear his feelings towards the colonial government that ruled over his people. The buildup for the movement towards independence had become so intense that there were even plots to either arrest or assassinate Ahmad Zaidi for being a very public rebel to the colonial government. He knew that at that stage even if Sarawak was able to attain independence, the machineries for the new Malaysian government will mostly be influenced by those Sarawakians who had worked for the colonial government. In the transition phase towards the formation of a new government, he received insider information that some of the expatriates who worked under the colonial administration preferred that he be eliminated for fear of revenge if Ahmad Zaidi became in control. He was dubbed a traitor by British authorities and supporters including many of the expatriates in the Sarawak government because of his strong influence and involvement in Barisan Pemuda Sarawak and suspected connection with Indonesia during the Indonesia-Malaysia Confrontation.

He was then abducted from Sarawak by his sympathizers and later went into self-exile in Indonesia until he was given amnesty by the Malaysian government in 1969, a move strongly supported by Tun Abdul Rahman Ya'kub, where the latter was a federal minister at the time.

After exiled for six months in Jakarta, Indonesia, Ahmad Zaidi was convinced that his troubles had died down. On 12 May 1969, he telephoned Normah Abdullah, the wife of chief minister of Sarawak at that time, Abdul Rahman Ya'kub to go back to Kuala Lumpur. However, Normah warned Ahmad Zaidi of brewing racial riots in Kuala Lumpur. The racial riots later developed into 13 May incident. Ahmad Zaidi returned to Kuching, Sarawak instead. Ahmad Zaidi also found that his step-father Wan Abu Bakar Adruce, Ahmad Zaidi's own son Bujang, and Anie Dhoby (brother of Rosli Dhoby) joined Sarawak National Party (SNAP). Stephen Kalong Ningkan, the former Sarawak chief minister and the leader of the SNAP party, invited Ahmad Zaidi to lead the Malay faction in the party. However, Ahmad Zaidi decided to retire from politics. Later, some members of the public still questioned him regarding his loyalty to Sarawak. Ahmad Zaidi again decided to take a break in the Java island, Indonesia.

In 1970s, Ahmad Zaidi became uneasy with the governing style of United Sabah National Organisation (USNO) on Sabah people. Ahmad Zaidi later developed good relationship with Harris Salleh, one of the leaders of the Sabah People's United Front (BERJAYA party). One month before the 1974 Malaysian general election, Ahmad Zaidi discovered a plot to kidnap Harris. Ahmad Zaidi informed Harris about the plot and the latter successfully escaped from the plot. In 1976 Sabah state election, although Ahmad Zaidi was a Sarawak cabinet minister, he openly campaigned for Harris's BERJAYA party. BERJAYA won the state election, ousting USNO from power. However, Harris involvement in Sabah politics gained animosity with several Sabah local leaders. They complained to chief minister of Sarawak Abdul Rahman Ya'kub. Later, Ahmad Zaidi found himself sidelined from Sarawak state politics. There were also rumours where Ahmad Zaidi would be replaced in his own Kalaka state constituency.

== Appointment as Yang di-Pertua Negeri Sarawak ==
When the Ming Court Affair was brewing in 1985, Abdul Taib Mahmud, the chief minister of Sarawak at that time, decided to remove the governor Abdul Rahman Ya'kub from office due dispute between them. Yang di-Pertuan Agong (king) of Malaysia at that time, Sultan Iskandar met Ahmad Zaidi privately. The king ordered Ahmad Zaidi to raise his hand to recite an oath of allegiance to the country.

On 1 April 1985, Ahmad Zaidi Adruce was appointed as the fifth Yang di-Pertua Negeri of Sarawak (Governor) Sarawak before the Speaker at the Sarawak State Legislative Assembly.

On 2 April 1985, he also took the oath of office in front of then king. He held the office for 15 years, the longest-serving governor in any Malaysian state without a hereditary ruler (in consecutive terms from a single appointment).

== Health ==
In 1974, while Ahmad Zaidi was taking a break in a family house in Bandung, Indonesia, he had a blackout and fractured his lumbar spine (lower backbone).

== Death ==
Ahmad Zaidi Adruce served three terms before passing on peacefully on 5 December 2000, leaving behind a lasting legacy as a true nationalist and as his people's first scholar. He was given a state funeral and was buried at Samariang Muslim Cemetery, Petra Jaya, Kuching.

== Election results ==
Sarawak State Legislative Assembly
Year	Constituency	Candidate	Votes	Pct	Opponent(s)	Votes	Pct	Ballots cast	Majority	Turnout
1974	N21 Kalaka	Ahmad Zaidi Adruce (PBB)	3,163	62.75%	Senawi Sulaiman (SNAP)	1,878	37.25%	5,378	1,285	85.64%

== Honours ==
=== Honours of Sarawak ===
- Knight Grand Commander of the Order of the Star of Hornbill Sarawak (DP) – Datuk Patinggi (1985)
- Knight Commander of the Most Exalted Order of the Star of Sarawak (PNBS) – formerly Dato', now Dato Sri (1981)

=== Honours of Malaysia ===
- Malaysia
  - Grand Commander of the Order of the Defender of the Realm (SMN) – Tun (1989)
  - Grand Commander of the Order of Loyalty to the Crown of Malaysia (SSM) – Tun (1987)
- Kedah
  - Knight Grand Commander of the Order of the Crown of Kedah (SPMK) – Dato' Seri (1997)
- Malacca
  - Knight Grand Commander of the Premier and Exalted Order of Malacca (DUNM) – Datuk Seri Utama (1987)
- Penang
  - Knight Grand Commander of the Order of the Defender of State (DUPN) – Dato' Seri Utama (1990)
- Sabah
  - Grand Commander of the Order of Kinabalu (SPDK) – Datuk Seri Panglima (1996)
- Selangor
  - Knight Grand Commander of the Order of the Crown of Selangor (SPMS) – Dato' Seri (1994)
- Terengganu
  - Member Grand Companion of the Order of Sultan Mahmud I of Terengganu (SSMT) – Dato' Seri (1996)

=== Foreign honours ===
- Brunei
  - First Class of the Order of Paduka Seri Laila Jasa (PSLJ) – Dato Paduka Seri Laila Jasa (1989)
- Indonesia
  - Second Class (Adipradana) of the Star of Mahaputera (1986)

=== Honorary degrees ===
- Malaysia
  - Honorary Ph.D. degree in law from National University of Malaysia (1993)

=== Others ===
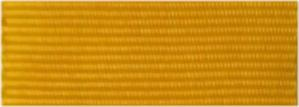
- Pingat Semangat Padi – 24 February 1990

=== Places named after him ===
Several places were named after him, including:

- Tun Ahmad Zaidi Religious National Secondary School (Malay: Sekolah Menengah Kebangsaan Agama Tun Ahmad Zaidi, SMKA TUNAZ), an Islamic religious school in Kuching, Sarawak
- Jalan Tun Ahmad Zaidi Adruce, is a major road in Kuching and Sibu, Sarawak
- Tun Ahmad Zaidi Residential College, a residential college at University of Malaya, Kuala Lumpur
- Tun Ahmad Zaidi College, a residential college at Universiti Malaysia Sarawak, Kota Samarahan, Sarawak
- Tun Zaidi Stadium, a stadium in Sibu, Sarawak

Political offices
Preceded by Abdul Rahman Ya'kub	Yang di-Pertua Negeri Sarawak; 1985–2000	Succeeded by Abang Muhammad Salahuddin
