= Wisma Bapa Malaysia =

Wisma Bapa Malaysia (Bangunan Tunku Abdul Rahman)
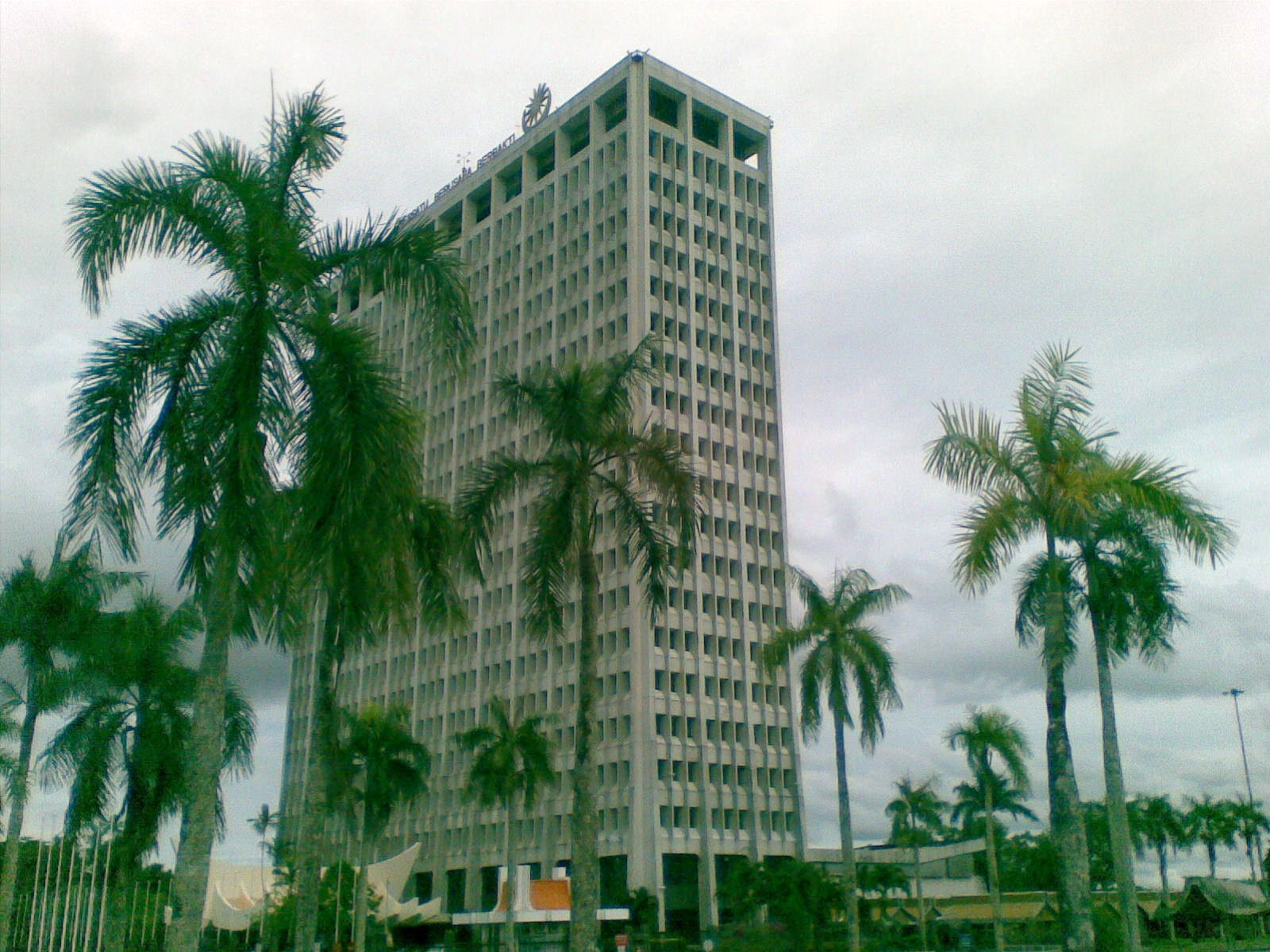
- Side view of the building
- Interactive map of the Wisma Bapa Malaysia (Bangunan Tunku Abdul Rahman) area

General information
- Status: Completed
- Type: Government offices
- Location: Kuching, Sarawak, Malaysia
- Coordinates: 1°34′4″N 110°21′6″E
- Construction started: 30 August 1973
- Completed: 1976
- Opening: 17 August 1976
- Owner: Sarawak State Government

Height
- Roof: 81.76 m (268.2 ft)

Technical details
- Floor count: 22
- Lifts/elevators: 6

Wisma Bapa Malaysia (Father of Malaysia building) also known as Bangunan Tunku Abdul Rahman (Tunku Abdul Rahman Building) is the Sarawak state secretariat building housing various government departments, including the Premier's office. It is located in Petra Jaya, Kuching. Wisma Bapa Malaysia was designed to be similar to the Malaysian Houses of Parliament in Kuala Lumpur in many aspects.

== History ==
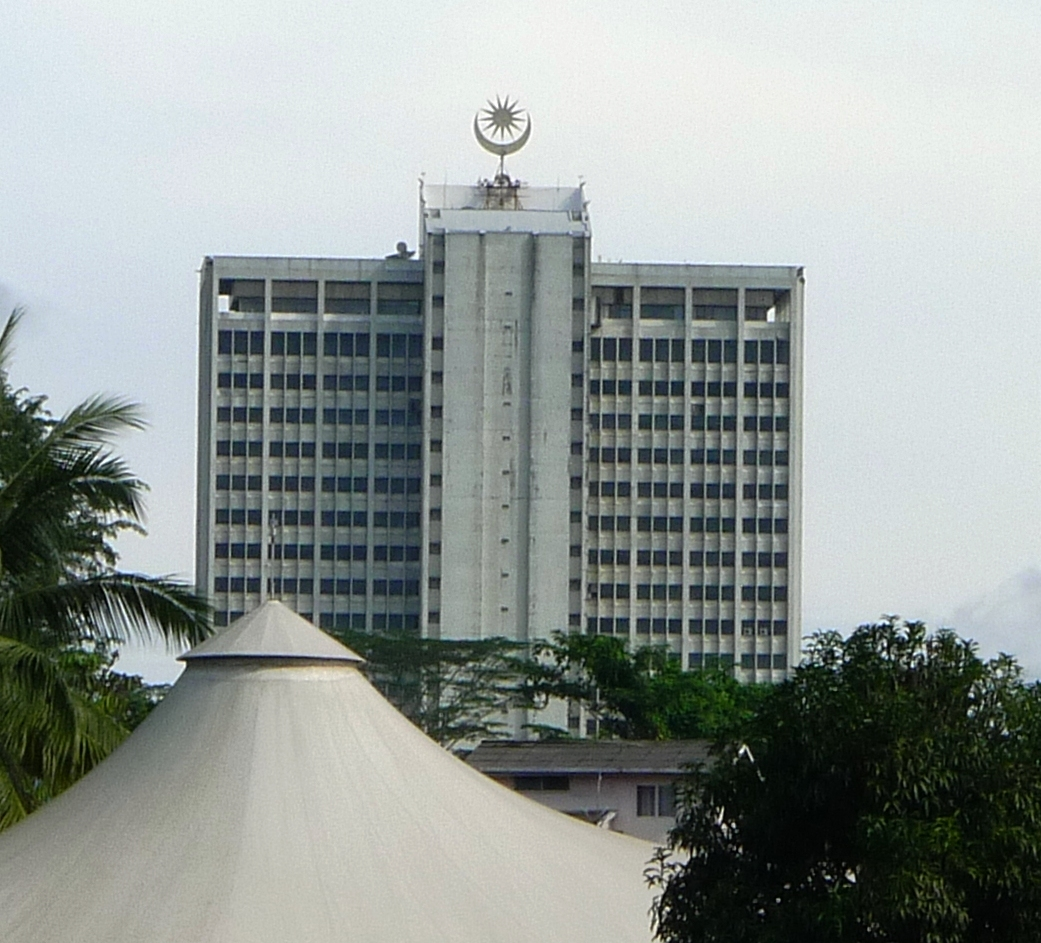
Backside of Wisma Bapa Malaysia

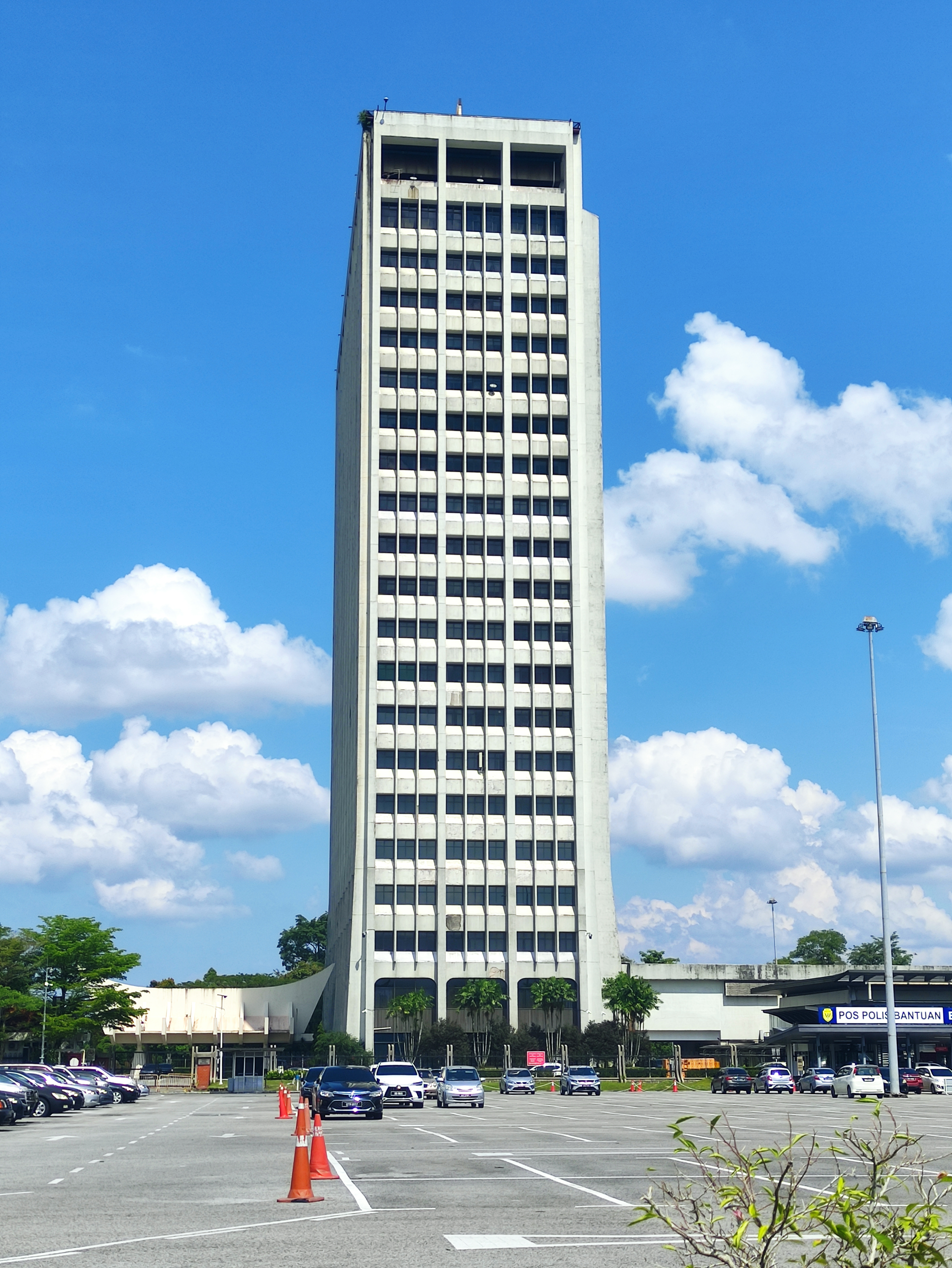
Wisma Bapa Malaysia architecture side view

Since its inception in August 1976, the building is sited on 90 acres (360,000 m^{2}) manicured gardens. The foundation stone of the Wisma Bapa Malaysia complex was laid by the first Prime Minister of Malaysia, the late Tunku Abdul Rahman Putra Al-Haj, on 30 August 1973 at the satellite township of Petra Jaya. The building was completed in 1976 and officially opened by the Yang di-Pertuan Agong, Tuanku Yahya Petra of Kelantan on 17 August 1976 followed by the Rulers' Conference in the building complex.

== State assembly building ==
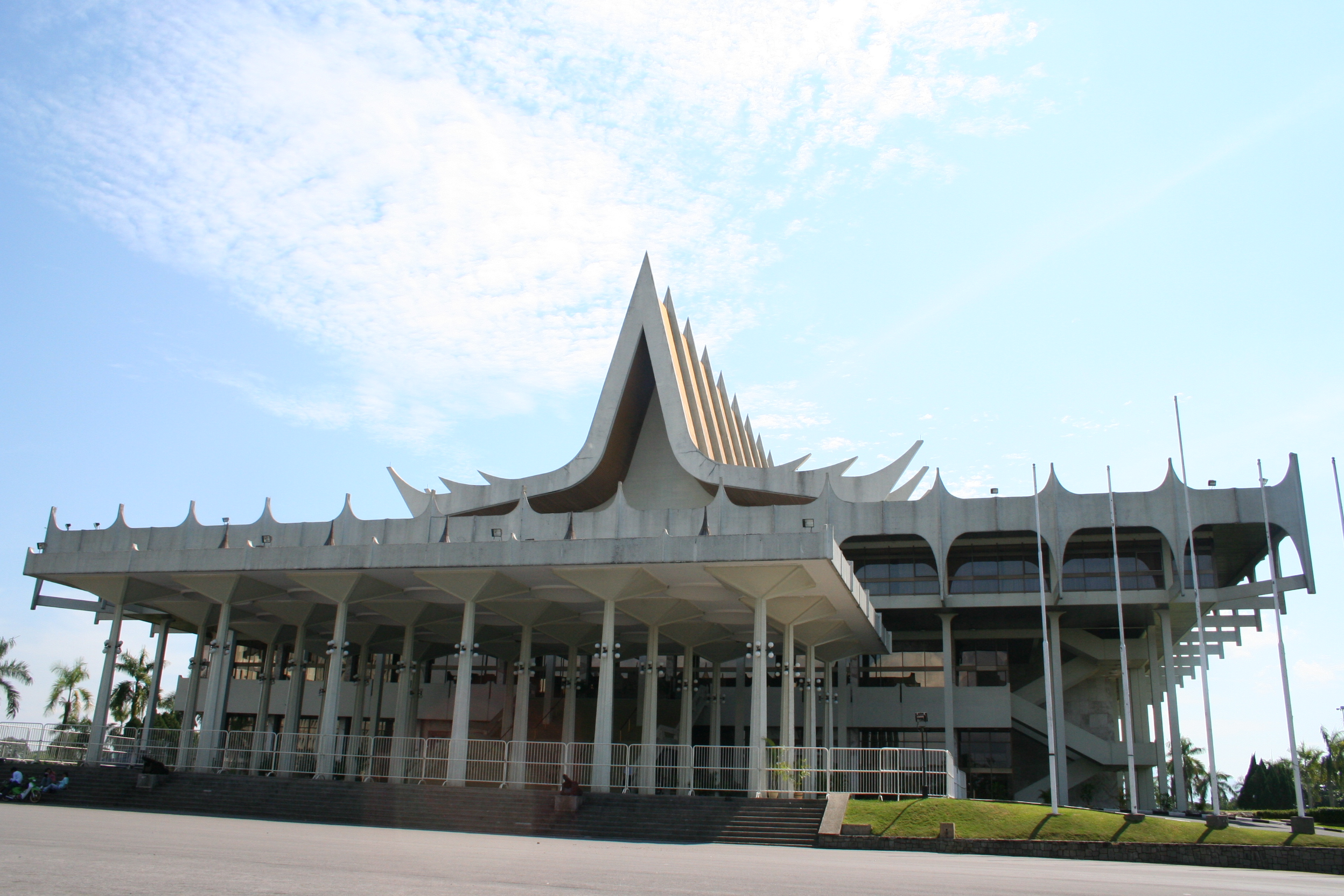
The Old State Legislative Assembly building within Wisma Bapa Malaysia complex.

This building complex also housed the August Institution (state assembly building) (1°34′9″N 110°21′0.1″E) from August 1976 until May 2009. The state assembly later moved to the New Sarawak State Legislative Assembly Building after the period. Assembly sittings were held in the August House for over a period of 33 years. As the oldest August Institution in Malaysia, the Sarawak State Legislative Assembly was established after its inaugural meeting in Bintulu, Sarawak on 8 September 1867. The three-floor building can accommodate about 1,000 people, with 160 seats and a gallery for 224 people.

As of April 2012, the building is under a very bad condition since the state assembly moved to the new building. No refurbishment plans on the building were made, but after a gap of 12 years in 2024, the old state legislative assembly building was slated to be redeveloped as the upcoming Sarawak Arts Centre which will be completed within 1-3 years time.

== See also ==
- The Astana, Sarawak
