= Datuk Patinggi Haji Abdul Rahman Bridge =

Sungai Sarawak Bridge Jambatan Datuk Patinggi Haji Abdul Rahman
- Coordinates: 1°33′17″N 110°19′25″E
- Carries: Motor vehicles
- Crosses: Sarawak River
- Locale: New Satok Bridge
- Official name: Datuk Patinggi Haji Abdul Rahman Bridge
- Maintained by: Dewan Bandaraya Kuching Utara (DBKU); Sarawak Rivers Board

Characteristics
- Design: Box girder bridge
- Total length: --
- Width: --
- Longest span: --

History
- Designer: --
- Constructed by: --
- Opened: 1975

Location
- Interactive map of Sungai Sarawak Bridge

The Datuk Patinggi Haji Abdul Rahman Bridge, also known as the Jambatan Datuk Patinggi Haji Abdul Rahman, and New Satok Bridge, is a major bridge crossing Sarawak River in Kuching city, Sarawak, Malaysia. Located near the bridge is the site of the former Satok Bridge.

The bridge was named after Tun Datuk Patinggi Haji Abdul Rahman Ya'kub (1928–2015), the former Chief Minister of Sarawak from 1970 to 1981 and Yang di-Pertua Negeri of Sarawak from 1981 to 1986, as well as Minister of Education from 1969 to 1970, in which he also previously served in other federal cabinet positions, such as Deputy Minister of National and Rural Development, Deputy Minister of Justice and Deputy Minister of Lands and Mines from 1964 to 1969.
