= Satok Suspension Bridge =

Suspension bridge in Kuching, Sarawak, Malaysia

Sungai Sarawak Bridge Jambatan Satok
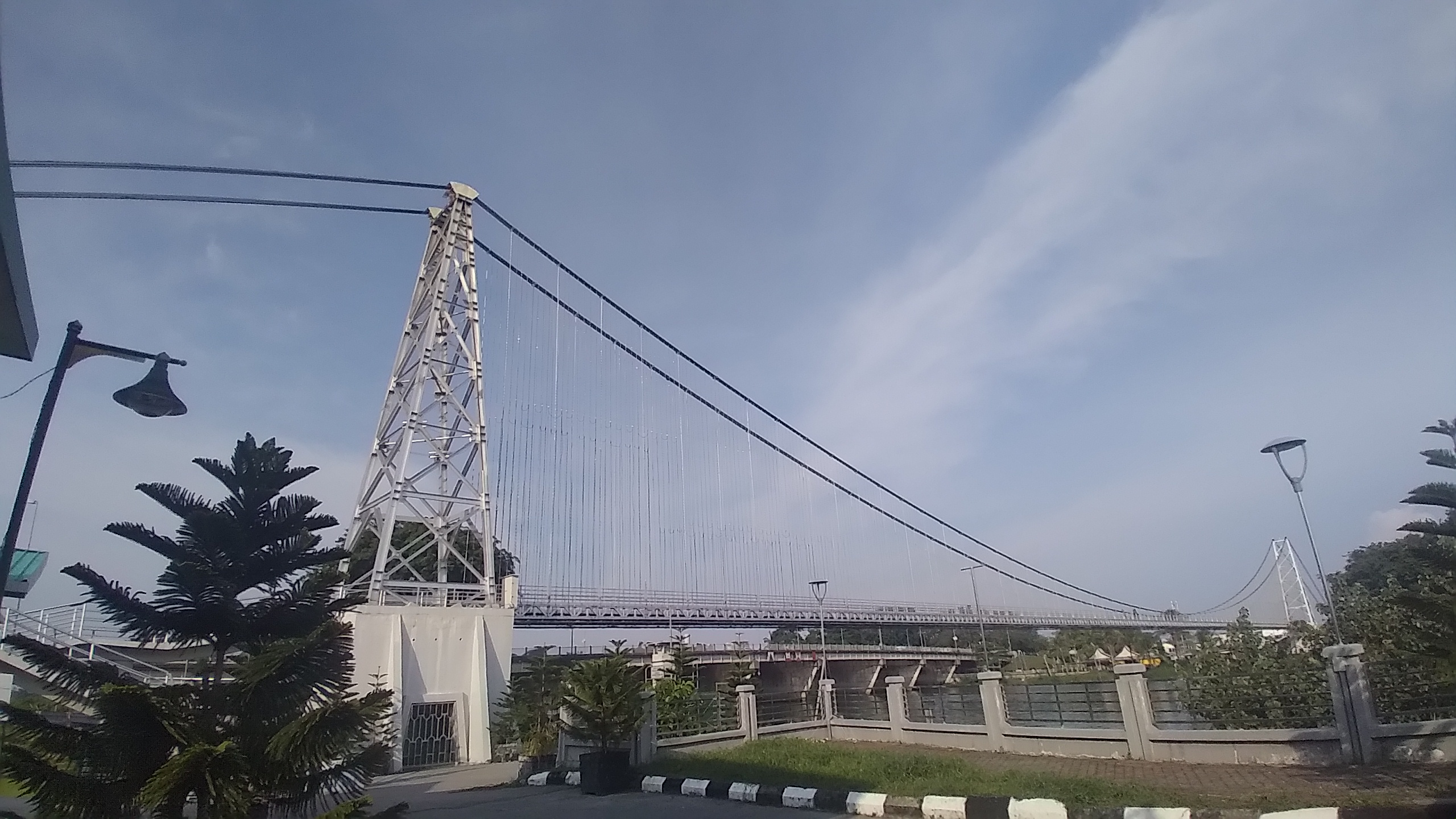
- Carries: Pedestrian
- Crosses: Sarawak River
- Locale: Satok Bridge
- Official name: Satok Bridge
- Maintained by: Dewan Bandaraya Kuching Utara (DBKU); Sarawak Rivers Board
- Website: srb.sarawak.gov.my

Characteristics
- Design: Suspension bridge
- Total length: 700 feet (1926)
- Width: 7 feet (1926)
- Longest span: --

History
- Designer: Mr. A.S.Lowe - Public Works Department Engineer
- Constructed by: Public Works Department (1926); Pekerjaan Piasau Konkerit Sdn Bhd (reconstruction)
- Construction cost: $52,000 (1926)
- Opened: 1926 (Brooke era); June 2020 (rebuild)

Satok Bridge or Jambatan Satok is a suspension bridge in Kuching city, Sarawak, Malaysia.

== History ==
Originally built in 1923–1926, Satok Suspension Bridge was meant to carry vital water pipelines across the Sarawak River, supplying clean water from the Matang Reservoir to Kuching. The bridge collapsed in 2004 during a storm. Because the bridge had many memories and was the first bridge to be built in Sarawak, the government decided to rebuild it in 2017 by choosing a local construction company, Pekerjaan Piasau Konkerit Sdn Bhd (PPK) as the main contractor. It was rebuilt in 2019, but work was suspended in October 2019 due to structural issues: an anchor block had become displaced. After structural correction and redesign, work resumed and the bridge was reopened 15 months later. The opening was officiated by then Chief Minister of Sarawak (now Premier), Abang Zohari Openg on 21 November 2021.

Near the bridge is the Datuk Patinggi Haji Abdul Rahman Bridge.

== Gallery ==
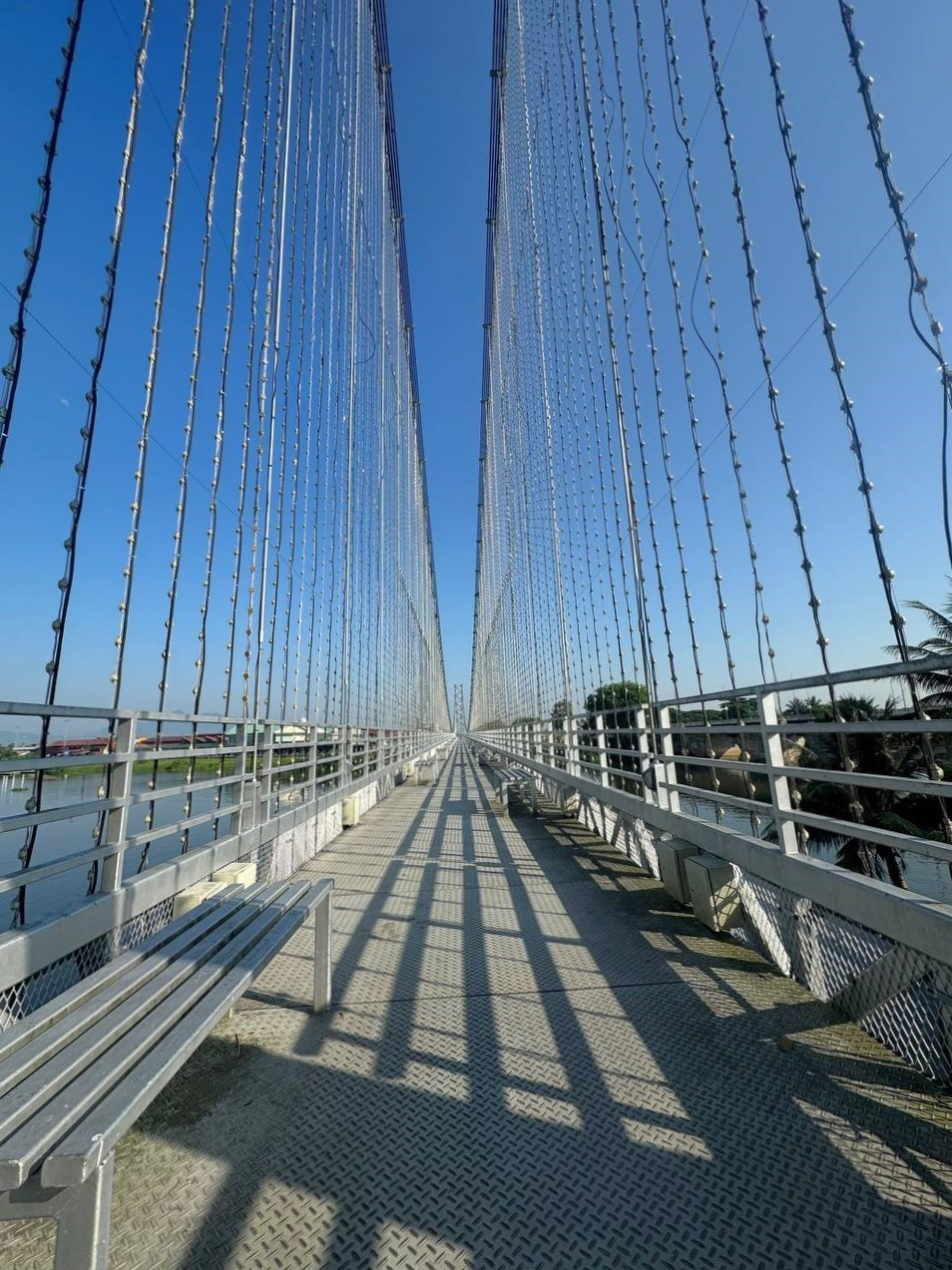
