= Petra Jaya =

Suburb in Kuching, Sarawak, Malaysia

- Town in Malaysia and suburb of Kuching
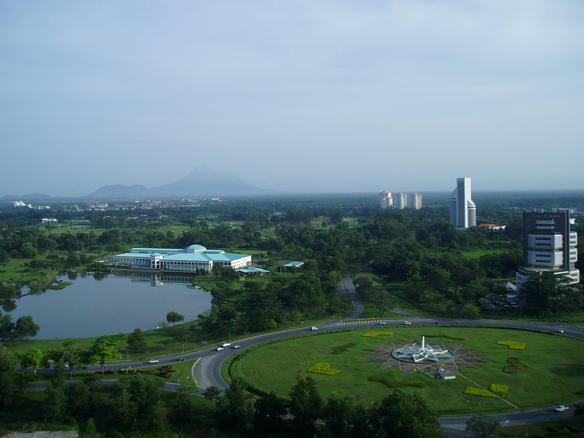
- Petra Jaya

- Petra Jaya in Sarawak, East Malaysia and Malaysia Petra Jaya (East Malaysia) Petra Jaya (Malaysia)
- Coordinates: 01°36′00″N 110°20′15″E
- Country: Malaysia
- State: Sarawak
- District: Kuching
- Time zone: UTC+8 (MYT)
- Postal code: 93050

Petra Jaya [ˌpetraˈd͡ʒaja, ˌpetrəˈd͡ʒajə] is a suburb of Kuching, Sarawak, Malaysia. This suburb was named after the sixth Yang di-Pertuan Agong, Tuanku Yahya Petra of Kelantan (1975-1979), added by jaya, the Sanskrit word for "victory," "triumph", or "success".

== History ==
The suburb was founded in the 1970s by Sarawak chief minister at that time named Abdul Rahman Ya'kub. He saw a vision to develop the jungles and old rubber plantations here as the new satellite township next to Kuching. He began the project by constructing a bridge between Petra Jaya and Kuching, known as Datuk Patinggi Haji Abdul Rahman Bridge, across the Sarawak River in May 1975. In 1976, Wisma Bapa Malaysia was built. He also started on low-cost housing project which is known as Kampung Malaysia Jaya (Malaysia Jaya village) today.

The area where Petra Jaya was sited was formerly known as Matang. Most of the land in the area then was undeveloped. Villages along and near the riverbanks of the Sarawak River were the only residential areas. The area was only accessible by the Satok Suspension Bridge, ferry or sampan. Since 1975, the completion of the Datuk Patinggi Tun Abdul Rahman Yaakub Bridge, known as the Satok Bridge, together with construction of new road networks has made the area more accessible to development. Development in the area was further accelerated when it was designated as the Administrative Centre for the Sarawak Government, whereby many government offices and bodies relocated their headquarters and offices to Petra Jaya.

== Administration ==
Petra Jaya is under the administrative jurisdiction of Dewan Bandaraya Kuching Utara (DBKU). The Kuching North City Hall (DBKU) headquarters is located here. In addition to that, the Administrative Centre of the Sarawak Government is located here.

== Geography ==
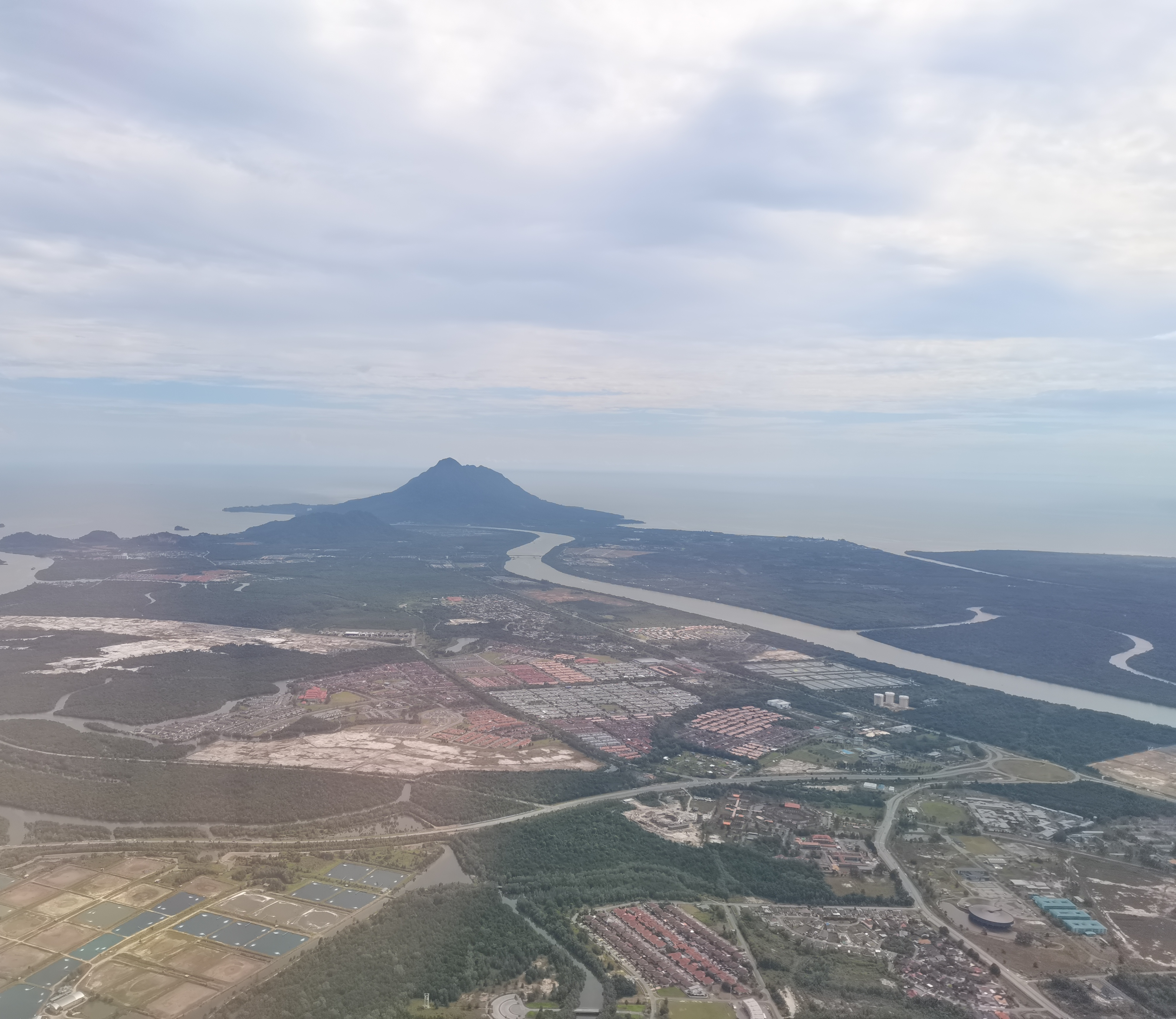
Right lower corner of the picture is the northern part of Petra Jaya. Further north are the Bandar Baru Samariang and Mount Santubong on the Santubong Peninsula. The Santubong River runs across these areas.

Petra Jaya spans a large part of Kuching City North, located across the Sarawak River to the north of Kuching City Centre. It stretches from the northern bank of the river, just beyond the Satok Bridge, up to the Santubong Bridge further north, which links Petra Jaya to the Santubong Peninsula. The terrain is generally flat, with some hilly areas near Semariang. Much of the land in this area is classified as Native Area Land, resulting in a significant Bumiputra population in Petra Jaya.

== Demographics ==
Total population of every areas in Petra Jaya, Kuching, Sarawak. These population are exactly based on their ethnics in Sarawak.

Malay is the dominant ethnic population in Petra Jaya, along with other ethnics in this area. However, only Bintawa area has a Chinese ethnic population.

1. Demak (Sejingkat)

- Malay : 26,048
- Iban : 5,761
- Chinese : 632
- Melanau : 195
- Bidayuh : 104
- Indian : 37
- Orang Ulu : 15
- Other ethnics : –

TOTAL : 32,792

2. Bintawa

- Chinese : 18,315
- Malay : 8,784
- Iban : 1,309
- Melanau : 211
- Indian : 106
- Bidayuh : 12
- Orang Ulu : –
- Other ethnics : –

TOTAL : 28,737

3. Santubong & Bako

- Malay : 31,786
- Iban : 2,390
- Chinese : 42
- Indian : 9
- Bidayuh : –
- Melanau : –
- Orang Ulu : –
- Other ethnics : –

TOTAL : 34,227

4. Samariang

- Malay : 42,191
- Chinese : 13,387
- Iban : 10,614
- Bidayuh : 930
- Indian : 882
- Melanau : –
- Orang Ulu : –
- Other ethnics : –

TOTAL : 68,004

5. Tanjung Embang

- Malay : 19,542
- Chinese : 3,806
- Iban : 1,503
- Melanau : 89
- Bidayuh : –
- Indian : –
- Orang Ulu : –
- Other ethnics : –

TOTAL : 24,940

== Development ==
Petra Jaya is the most developed area in Kuching City North, excluding those parts of DBKU situated south of the Sarawak River. The southern section, closer to the river, is relatively densely developed, primarily featuring residential neighborhoods. Commercial areas are limited, with only a few clusters of shophouses scattered throughout. Notably, large-scale industries are almost entirely absent in Petra Jaya, except for a few small-scale, light industrial establishments.

== Transportation ==
Petra Jaya is accessible from Kuching City South via Datuk Patinggi Haji Abdul Rahman Bridge from Satok and the newly completed Tun Salahuddin Bridge from Pending. Alternative access is via the Bako Causeway or Jalan Matang-Batu Kawa. Petra Jaya typical low density characteristic of a suburb has caused residents to be heavily reliant on cars because public transportation is quite poor in this part of Kuching.

== List of attractions ==
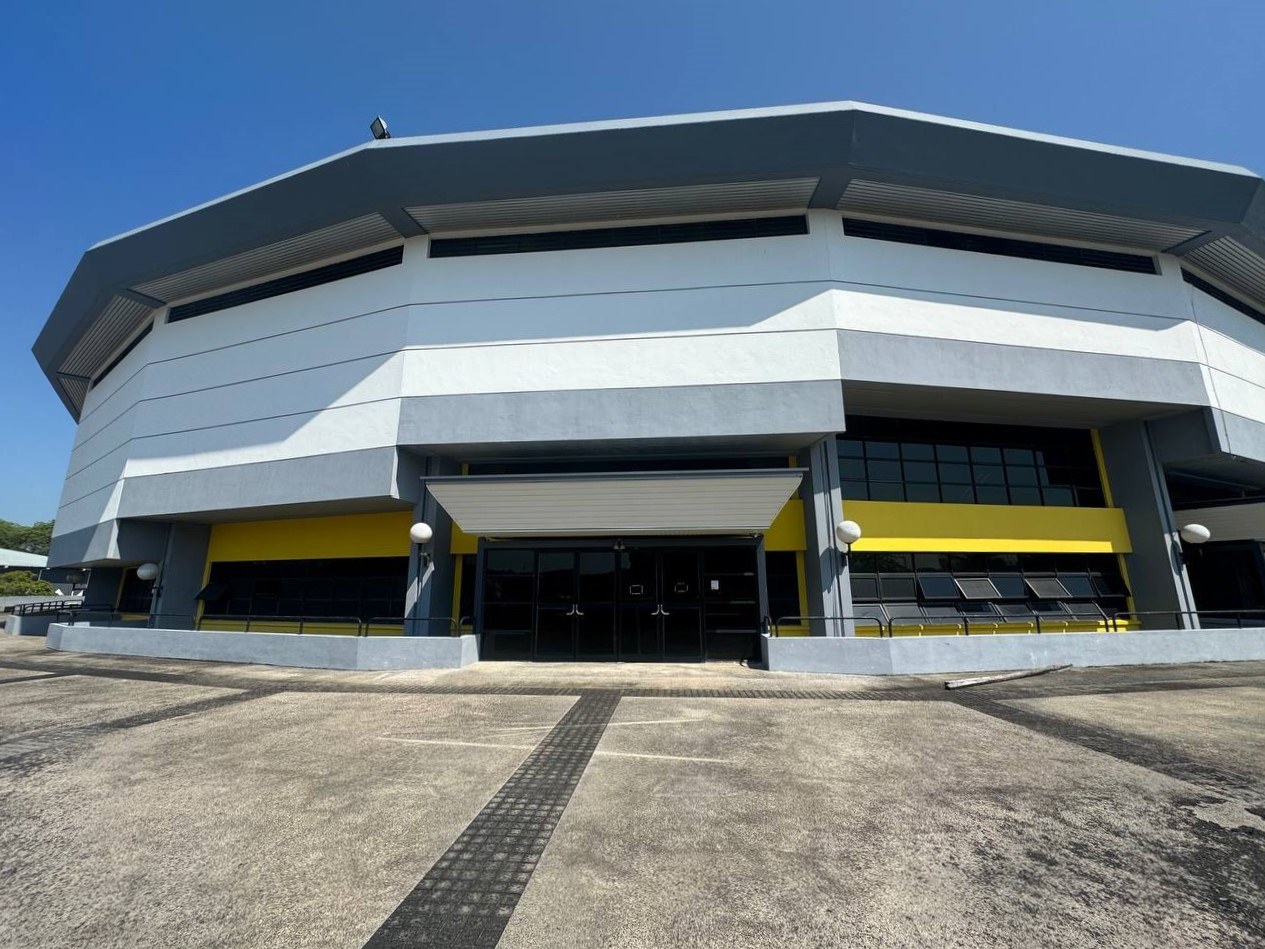
PETROS Arena (also known as Stadium Perpaduan)

- The Astana
- Fort Margherita
- Sarawak State Museum
- Wisma Bapa Malaysia
- Sarawak Performing Arts Centre - formerly this building was the old building of Sarawak State Legislative Assembly
- Satria Pertiwi Complex (Kompleks Satria Pertiwi) - the new Sarawak state administrative complex and new Premier of Sarawak office, replacing the current office at Wisma Bapa Malaysia.
- Hospital Petra Jaya
- New Sarawak Legislative Assembly Building - the new Sarawak assembly building in Kuching
- Wisma Melayu Sarawak
- Petra Jaya State Mosque
- Darul Hana Mosque
- Darul Hana Bridge
- Sarawak State Library
- Sarawak Science Centre (Pusat Sains Sarawak) - new international science centre in Kuching
- Sarawak Archive Complex (Kompleks Arkib Sarawak) - new state archive building in Petra Jaya
- Sarawak Media Group (SMG) Broadcasting Complex – a new modern broadcasting, digital media, and television complex building in Petra Jaya. Inspired from both Special Broadcasting Service (SBS) and Australian Broadcasting Corporation (ABC) in Australia, this all new broadcasting, media, and digital complex building also complete with a new modern SMG office headquarters, TVS broadcasting office, and also the International Broadcast Center (IBC) building which is the first ever IBC in Sarawak.
- Kuching North City Hall (DBKU) headquarters, Bukit Siol
- Kuching Cat Museum
- Hornbill's statue in Pantai Damai
- Damai Beach Resort
- Taha Ariffin Stadium - official home stadium of Kuching City F.C.
- Tan Sri Haji Adenan Satem Stadium (also known as Sarawak Stadium) - mostly used for major sports events, athletic sports, formal events, live concerts, and conferences
- PETROS Arena (also known as Stadium Perpaduan)
- DBKU Orchid Garden
- Kubah Ria (Wet Market near Satok Bridge)
- Pandelela Rinong Aquatic Centre
- Sarawak Sports Village
