= Sibu =

Town in Sarawak, Malaysia

- Town and district capital
- Sibu Town; Bandar Sibu
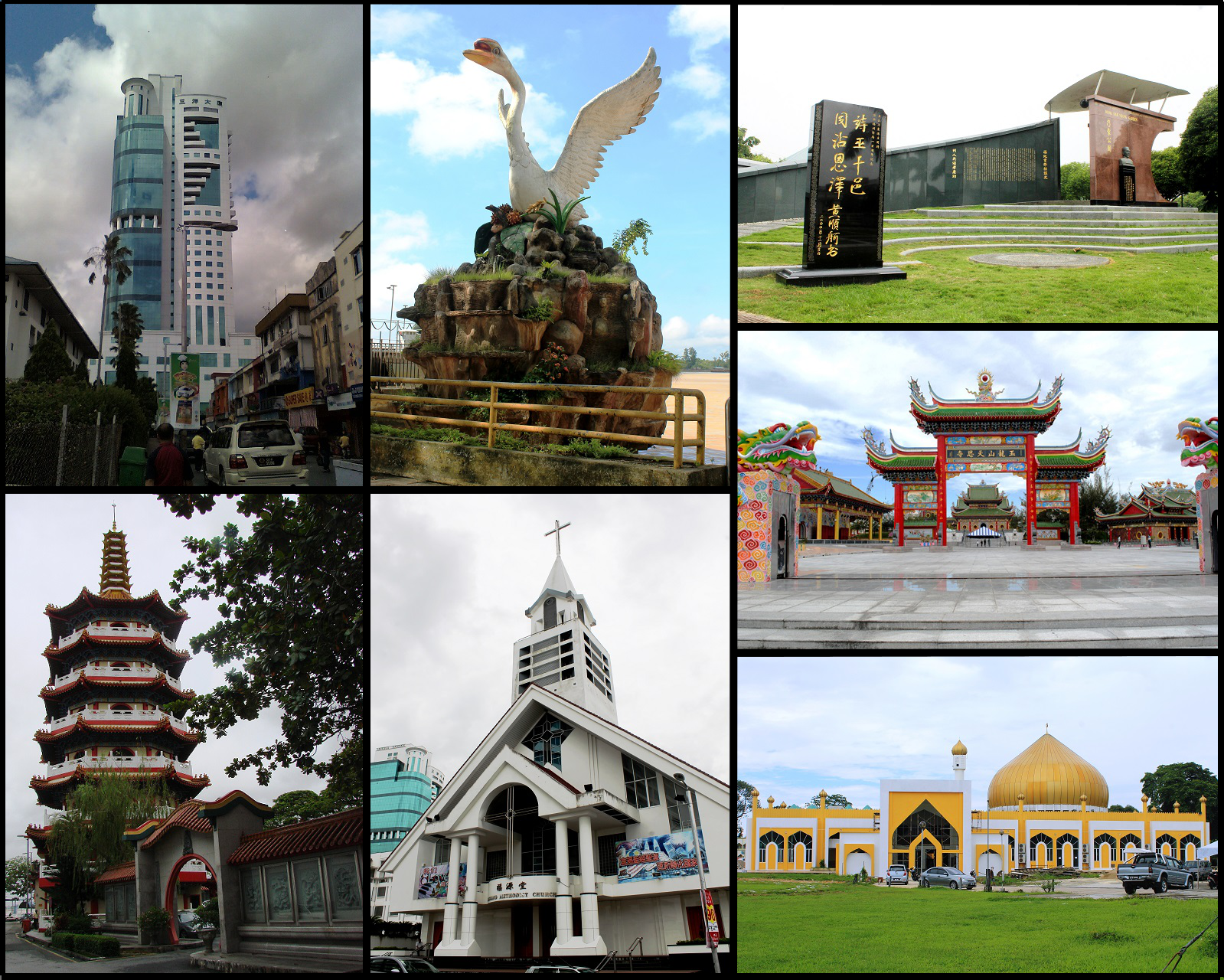
- Clockwise from top right: Wong Nai Siong Memorial Garden, Jade Dragon Temple, An-Nur Mosque, Masland Methodist church, Tua Pek Kong Temple, Wisma Sanyan, and swan statue.

- Seal
- Nickname: "Swan City"
- Location of Sibu in Sarawak
- Sibu in Malaysia Sibu (Malaysia) Sibu (Southeast Asia) Sibu (Asia)
- Coordinates: 02°17′16″N 111°49′51″E
- Country: Malaysia
- State: Sarawak
- Division: Sibu
- District: Sibu
- Founded by James Brooke: 1862
- Settled by Wong Nai Siong: 21 January 1901
- Municipality: 1 November 1981

Government
  - Type: Sibu Municipal Council
  - Chairman: Clarence Ting Ing Horh
  - Resident: Abang Mohamad Porkan Abang Budiman

Area
  - Sibu city: 129.5 km^{2} (50.0 sq mi)
- Elevation: 0 m (0 ft)
- Highest elevation: 59 m (194 ft)

Population (2014)
  - Sibu city: 162,676
  - Density: 1,256/km^{2} (3,250/sq mi)
  - Metro: 240,165
- Time zone: UTC+8 (MST)
  - Summer (DST): UTC+8 (Not observed)
- Postal code: 96xxx
- Area code(s): 084 (landline only)
- Vehicle registration: QS (for all vehicles except taxis); HQ (for taxis only)
- Website: www.smc.gov.my

Sibu (/ˈsiːbuː/) is a city located in the central region of Sarawak, Malaysia. It serves as the capital of Sibu District within Sibu Division and is situated on the island of Borneo. Covering an area of 129.5 square kilometres (50.0 sq mi), the city is positioned at the confluence of the Rajang and Igan Rivers, approximately 60 kilometres from the South China Sea and 191.5 kilometres (119 mi) north-east of the state capital, Kuching.

== Etymology ==
Before 1873, Sibu was known as "Maling", a name derived from a bend in the Rajang River referred to as "Tanjung Maling". This bend was located opposite the present-day town of Sibu and near the confluence of the Igan and Rajang rivers.

On 1 June 1873, under the administration of the Brooke family, the third division of Sarawak was established, later known as the Sibu Division. The name "Sibu" itself was derived from the native Pulasan fruit, which was abundant in the region. In the Iban language, this fruit is known as "Buah Sibau".

== History ==
=== Bruneian Empire ===
In the 15th century, a historical event occurred in the region of southern Sarawak, which led to the displacement of immigrant Iban communities towards what is now known as the Sibu region.

During the 17th and 18th centuries, the Rajang basin witnessed a series of tribal conflicts involving the Iban people and the indigenous populations residing in the same geographical area. These conflicts often resulted in skirmishes and confrontations. At times the Iban groups would establish informal alliances with the Malay communities in the vicinity. These alliances were occasionally utilised for joint actions, such as launching attacks on the Kayan tribes inhabiting the region and conducting raids on passing Chinese and Indonesian vessels that traversed through this particular area.

=== Kingdom of Sarawak (Brooke administration) ===
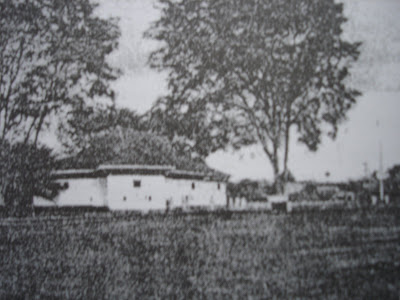
A photo of Sibu Fort, taken between 1862 and 1908.

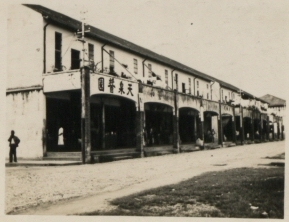
The photo of Sibu bazaar, taken between 1900 and 1930.

In 1841, James Brooke acquired the territory of Sarawak, now known as Kuching, from the Bruneian Empire. In 1853, the Sibu region was also incorporated into Sarawak.

The earliest inhabitants of Sibu were the Melanau people, followed by the influx of Iban and Malay communities in the 1850s. Rajah Brooke, in 1862, oversaw the construction of Sibu Fort (commonly referred to as Fort Brooke), strategically situated at present-day Channel Road in Sibu. This fort played a pivotal role as an administrative centre for the Brooke government in Sibu. However, it was demolished in 1936.

It was customary for the White Rajah to erect such forts to assert territorial claims and provide protection. The existence of Sibu Fort is substantiated by historical accounts which described its location and history:

There is a fort in Sibu, as indeed there is at most of the river places in Sarawak...

The fort at Sibu was close to the Resident Dr. Hose's house and was attacked by Dayaks only a few years ago. Johnson, one of Dr. Hose's assistants, showed me a very long Dayak canoe capable of seating over one hundred men...

The river at Sibu was of great width, over a mile across, in fact, and close to the bank is a Malay village, and a bazaar where the wily Chinaman does a thriving trade in the wild produce of the country, and makes huge profits out of the Dayaks and other natives on this river.

— Reported by H. Wilfrid Walke in 1909.

On 13 May 1870, the fort faced an attack by 3,000 Kanowit Dayaks, led by a Dayak chief named Lintong (Mua-ri). They attempted to breach the fort's doors with axes but were eventually repelled by the Brooke administration.

As per records from the Sarawak Gazette on 24 January 1871, Sibu boasted 60 wooden shops. In 1873, the town of Sibu was incorporated into the newly created third division of Sarawak.

The first Chinese settlers arrived in Sibu during the 1860s, with a group of Hokkien people constructing two rows of 40 shophouses around Sibu Fort. These early Chinese settlers were a minority, primarily consisting of Kekhs and Min Nan individuals engaged in commerce. A small number of Chiang Chuan and Amoy people also settled in Sibu for commercial purposes.

By 1893, Munan anak Minggat and his followers arrived in Sibu, establishing a longhouse on Pulau Kerto, an island at the confluence of the Rajang and Igan rivers near Sibu. Munan was a loyal ally to the Brooke government and played a crucial role in suppressing Iban rebellions in the Upper Katibas and Lupar rivers during the 1860s and 1880s. In 1903, Munan became the first Iban to operate a rubber plantation in Kuching and subsequently invested the profits in shop-houses and lands in Sibu.

However, on 10 February 1889, a devastating fire razed the town of Sibu, leading to a setback in its development. The first hospital in Sibu was established by the Brooke government in 1912, a wooden single-storey building featuring an outpatient department and male and female wards.

On 8 March 1928, Sibu faced another significant fire; however, the Tua Pek Kong Temple miraculously survived, earning it local reverence.

=== Fuzhounese settlement ===
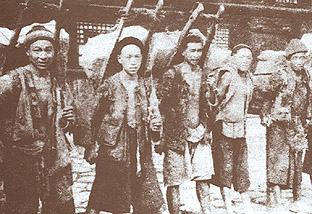
Arrival of Fuzhou Fujian Chinese immigrants in 1900

Wong Nai Siong, a Christian scholar originally from Minqing County, Fujian, China, became acquainted with Sarawak and the White Rajahs through his son-in-law, Dr. Lim Boon Keng. Disillusioned by the Qing dynasty's heavy-handed response during the Boxer Rebellion, which specifically targeted Chinese Christians for violence, Wong embarked on a quest to find a new settlement overseas, with a focus on Southeast Asia. Prior to arriving in Sarawak, Wong explored other regions in Malaya and Indonesia for potential settlement, albeit without success.

Wong obtained approval from Charles Brooke to search for a new settlement in the Rajang basin. In April 1900, after a 13-day journey up the Rajang River, he decided to establish Sibu as the new settlement for his Fuzhounese clansmen, as the area near the Rajang delta was well-suited for agriculture. An agreement was formalised on 9 July 1900 between Wong Nai Siong and the Brooke government in Kuching, allowing Chinese settlers to inhabit the area.

On 21 January 1901, the first group of 72 settlers arrived in Sibu and settled in the Sungai Merah area, hailing from Fuzhou, Fujian, located about 6 km from the town of Sibu. The second batch of 535 settlers arrived on 16 March 1901, marking what is now known as "New Fuzhou Resettlement Day". In June 1901, a final group of 511 settlers joined them, bringing the total number of Fuzhounese settlers to 1,118.

Wong Nai Siong was appointed as the "Kang Choo" (港主, "port master") for the Fuzhounese settlement in Sibu. The settlers cultivated crops such as sweet potatoes, fruits, sugar cane, vegetables, and coarse grains in upland areas and rice in wetlands. Most of these settlers chose to remain in Sibu, considering it their new home. Collaborating with American pastor Reverend James Matthew Hoover, Wong and his associates were actively involved in the establishment of schools and churches in Sibu, including the Methodist church in 1902 and Ying Hua Methodist School at Sungai Merah in 1903.

Between 1903 and 1935, Reverend James Hoover played a pivotal role in constructing 41 churches and 40 schools in Sibu. In the interim, 676 Cantonese individuals arrived in Sibu between 1902 and 1917. However, in 1904, Wong opposed the proposed sale of opium and the construction of a casino in the Sibu area, initiatives put forth by the Brooke government. Subsequently, he faced expulsion by the Sarawak government due to an inability to repay debts. Wong and his family departed from Sibu in July 1904.

Following Wong's departure, Reverend James Hoover assumed responsibility for managing the Sibu settlement and introduced the first rubber seedlings to Sibu in 1904. He erected a Methodist church in 1905, later renamed Masland Methodist Church in 1925. Hoover remained in the Rajang basin for an additional 31 years until his demise from malaria in 1935, while the construction of Lau King Howe Hospital was completed in 1936 to cater to the growing population of Sibu. The hospital served the people of Sibu for 58 years until 1994 when a new hospital was built in Sibu.

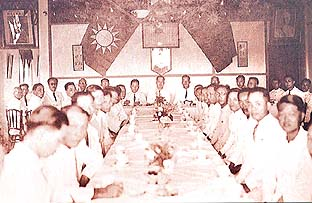
A 1920 Kuomintang meeting in Sibu

By 1919, the influence of the Chinese Civil War extended to Sarawak, with the Kuomintang establishing its initial branches in Sibu and Kuching. The then-reigning Rajah, Charles Brooke, opposed such political involvement by the local Chinese population and expelled several local Kuomintang leaders. However, his successor, Charles Vyner Brooke, displayed a more receptive stance toward the activities of the local Chinese, who also engaged in fundraising to support the Kuomintang's resistance against Japanese invasion in mainland China.

Following the conclusion of World War II, local Kuomintang leaders advocated for Sarawak's transfer to British control as a Crown Colony. This move encountered opposition from local communist leaders, leading to frequent clashes between the two factions. The Kuomintang branches in Sarawak were ultimately disbanded in 1949 when the party lost the Chinese Civil War to the Communist Party and retreated to Taiwan. Nevertheless, tensions and conflicts between the two groups persisted until 1955, with the colonial British government banning the Kuomintang's newspaper in May 1951, and the communist newspaper ceasing publication in 1955 due to financial difficulties.

=== Japanese occupation ===
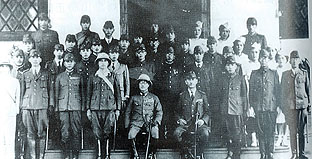
A photo was taken with Japanese generals and the new Resident of Third Division after Sibu was renamed to "Sibu-shu".

During World War II, Japanese forces initiated their invasion of the region by landing in Miri on 16 December 1941. Subsequently, they conquered Kuching on 24 December. On 25 December, Sibu experienced an air raid by nine Japanese warplanes that had flown from Kuching. Concerned about the impending invasion of Sibu, Andrew MacPherson, the Resident of the Third Division, made the decision to evacuate with his officers to the upstream area of the Rajang River. Their plan was to traverse through Batang Ai and navigate through the dense forests to reach Dutch Borneo. They were apprehended and killed by Japanese forces at Ulu Moyan in Sarawak.

On the evening of 26 December 1941, chaos erupted in Sibu as local residents began looting an unguarded government rice storeroom. This unrest extended beyond mere looting, with villagers residing along the Rajang River also partaking in thefts of daily necessities. The situation rapidly spiraled out of control, resulting in significant damage to the British Sime Darby company, Borneo Company Limited, and Chinese businessmen who became victims of these riots. In an attempt to restore order, Chinese businessmen in the region banded together to form a security alliance.

To address the growing disorder, an advance team from Japan arrived in Sibu on 29 January 1942, after being summoned from Kuching. However, this team eventually fled Sibu and returned to Kuching. Consequently, a power vacuum persisted in the third division until 23 June 1942, when the Japanese headquarters in Kuching appointed Senda Nijiro as the new Resident of the Third Division of Sarawak. Upon assuming office, Senda Nijiro declared that the Imperial Japanese Army would assume complete control over people's lives and property in the region. On 8 August 1942, Sibu was officially renamed "Sibu-shu".

The Japanese authorities began to impose heavy taxes on the Chinese population and initiated a Sook Ching operation to identify suspected anti-Japanese individuals. Some Chinese individuals, under extreme torture, provided false lists of names of supposed anti-Japanese groups. These lists led to the wrongful execution of innocent individuals at the Bukit Lima execution ground, while others were incarcerated in a prison in Kapit.

=== British Crown Colony ===
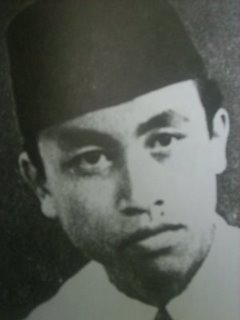
Rosli Dhobi

Following the end of the Japanese occupation of Sarawak in 1945, Charles Vyner Brooke, the last Rajah of Sarawak, made the decision to cede the state to become part of the British crown colony of Sarawak. This proposal faced significant opposition from the local population, leading to the emergence of the anti-cession movement in Sarawak.

One prominent figure in the anti-cession movement was Rosli Dhobi, a Sarawak nationalist hailing from Sibu and a member of the Malay Youth Movement (Gerakan Pemuda Melayu). The primary objective of this movement was to secure Sarawak's independence from British colonial rule.

At the young age of 17, Rosli carried out the assassination of Sir Duncan George Stewart, the second governor of colonial Sarawak, on 3 December 1949. This act was a reflection of his strong commitment to the anti-cession cause.

Rosli, along with three of his accomplices, namely Awang Ramli Amit, Bujang Suntong, and Morshidi Sidek, were subsequently tried and sentenced to death by hanging. On 2 March 1950, they were buried at the Kuching Central Prison.

In recognition of their role in the anti-colonial movement against the British, Rosli Dhobi and his associates were later given a full state funeral by the Sarawak state government. Their remains were relocated from the Kuching Central Prison and interred at the Sarawak Heroes Mausoleum near the Sibu Town Mosque on 2 March 1996.

=== Communist insurgency ===
In the early 1950s, influenced by the establishment of the People's Republic of China in 1949, communist members in Sibu began to establish a presence in Sarawak. Huang Sheng Zi from Bintangor became the president of the Borneo Communist Party (BCP), and BCP activities were concentrated in areas such as Sibu, Sarikei, and Bintangor. Huang Zeng Ting, another communist and Huang Sheng Zi's brother, played a significant role in the formation of Sarawak's first political party, the Sarawak United Peoples' Party (SUPP), becoming its first executive secretary.

In 1954, the Sarawak Liberation League (SLL) was formed following the consolidation of the BCP with several other communist organisations. The spread of communism in Sibu was facilitated by student movements in schools like Chung Hua Secondary School, Catholic High School, and Wong Nai Siong High School. Communist strongholds in Sibu were notably located at Oya Road and Queensway (now Jalan Tun Abang Haji Openg). The movement also received support from the intelligentsia and workers in Sibu. Dr. Wong Soon Kai, for example, supported the movement by providing free medication. Villagers in Kampung Tanjung Kunyit were among those pressured to supply food and medical provisions to the communists.

In March 1971, the communists initiated an anti-pornography campaign, and in early 1973, they launched another campaign opposing tax increases and price inflation while advocating for higher wages for workers. Communist volunteers distributed pamphlets at various locations, including shophouses, schools, and the wharf terminal. They also engaged in military operations against police stations and naval bases, resorting to extreme measures such as beheading suspected government informants. The town of Sibu experienced on-and-off 24-hour curfews for several months.

On 25 March 1973, the Sarawak government, led by Chief Minister Abdul Rahman Ya'kub, began cracking down on communist activities in the Rajang basin by establishing the "Rajang Special Security Area". A day later, the Rajang Security Command (RASCOM) was formed through the cooperation of civil, military, and police command headquarters. By August 1973, several communist members had been captured, and these individuals provided crucial information that further weakened the communist movement.

On 22 September 1973, Abdul Rahman initiated "Operation Judas", resulting in the capture of 29 people from the town of Sibu, including doctors, lawyers, businessmen, teachers, and one former member of parliament. Following the surrender of a communist movement in Sri Aman on 21 October 1973, communist activities in the Rajang basin began to decline and never fully recovered their previous strength. The communist movement in Sarawak finally came to an end in 1990.

=== Recent developments ===
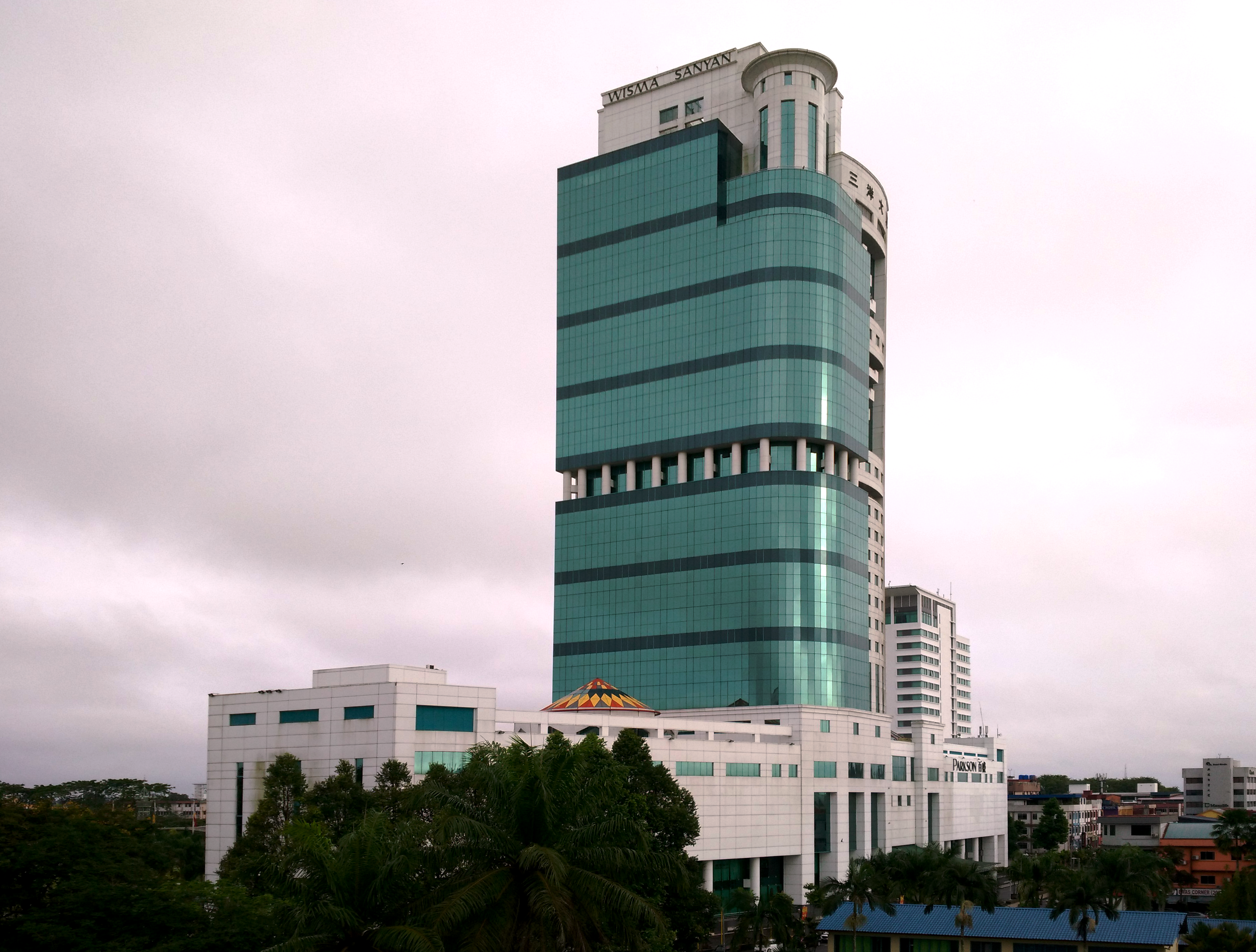
Wisma Sanyan in Sibu.

On 1 November 1981, the local council which administered the town of Sibu (Sibu Urban District Council) was upgraded to Sibu Municipal Council. The area of administration of Sibu expanded from 50 km^{2} to 129.5 km^{2}. In 1994, Sibu Airport and Sibu Hospital were constructed. In 2001, Wisma Sanyan construction was completed. Yang di-Pertuan Agong of Malaysia, Sultan Salahuddin Abdul Aziz Shah visited Sibu from 16 to 17 September 2001 to close a month-long Malaysian Independence Day Celebration at Sibu Town Square.

Between 1999 and 2004, Sibu Municipal Council decided to adopt the swan as a symbol of Sibu to inspire the people to work towards the goal of becoming a city in the future. Since then, a Swan statue has been erected near the Sibu wharf terminal and another statue is located in the town centre. Sibu is also nicknamed as "Swan City". This came from a legend where famine in Sibu ended when a flock of swans flew through the skies of Sibu. There is another story where the Sibu Chinese immigrants regarded Sibu Melanau people as "Go" people because a staple food of Melanau staple food was "Sago".

In 2006, the Lanang Bridge connecting Sibu to Sarikei was opened. Sibu also functions as the gateway to Sarawak Corridor of Renewable Energy (SCORE). The town of Sibu and its surrounding areas has been the subject of several developmental projects since 2008. In 2011, the 110th anniversary of Fuzhou settlement was celebrated in Sibu. However, Sibu's population growth and economic development is relatively slow when compared to Miri and Bintulu.

In September 2023, Sibu had the honour of hosting a two-day visit from the 16th Yang di-Pertuan Agong Al-Sultan Abdullah Ri'ayatuddin Al-Mustafa Billah Shah and Raja Permaisuri Agong Tunku Azizah Aminah Maimunah Iskandariah as part of their Kembara Kenali Borneo tour. This marked the second royal visit to Sibu.

== Government ==
Administrative districts of Sibu Division

Sibu is represented by two members of parliament (MPs) who oversee the town's two parliamentary federal constituencies: Lanang and Sibu. Additionally, the town elects five representatives to the Sarawak State Legislative Assembly, each representing a specific constituency: Bukit Assek, Dudong, Bawang Assan, Pelawan, and Nangka.

=== Local authorities ===
Sibu's local council traces its origins back to 31 January 1925, during the Brooke administration. It was later upgraded to Sibu Urban District Council (SUDC) in 1952. Initially established, it evolved into the Sibu Urban District Council (SUDC) in 1952. After nearly three decades of operation, SUDC underwent further development, culminating in its upgrade to the Sibu Municipal Council (SMC) on 1 November 1981.

SMC assumes authority over the town, overseeing a jurisdiction spanning 129.5 km^{2}, extending from the banks of the Rajang River to the uptown area along Jalan Salim. Initially headquartered within the Sibu Town Hall from 1962 to 2000, SMC later relocated to Wisma Sanyan in 2001. The current chairman of SMC is Clarence Ting Ing Horh.

Beyond the town centre, peripheral areas like Sibu Jaya and the district of Selangau fall under the administration of the Sibu Rural District Council (SRDC), which manages a vast territory covering 6,000 km^{2}. Both SMC and SRDC are headquartered within Wisma Sanyan.

Furthermore, Sibu's administrative landscape expanded with the inauguration of the Sibu Islamic Complex in September 2014. This complex serves as the home to various governmental bodies, including the Sibu Resident Office, Sibu District Office, State Treasury Office, Social Welfare Department, and the State Islamic Religious Department (JAIS).

=== International relations ===
As of 2015, Sibu is twinned to fifteen places in China:

Bozhou, China; Fuqing, China; Fuzhou, China; Guangning County, China	Gulou District, Fuzhou, China; Gutian County, China; Jintang County, China; Minqing County, China	Nanping, China; Ningde, China; Pingnan County, China; Putian, China	Puyang County, China; Qinghe County, Hebei, China; Wuyishan, Fujian, China

== Geography ==
Sibu is located near the Rajang delta at the confluence of Rajang and Igan rivers. Peat swamp forests and alluvial plains are particularly prevalent in the Sibu Division. Sibu is located on a deep peat soil, which has caused problems in infrastructure development because buildings and roads slowly sink into the ground after its completion. The location of Sibu in lowland peat swamps have subjected it to frequent floods, about 1 to 3 times per year. Because of these factors, the Sibu Flood Mitigation project was started to relieve the area from the floods. The highest elevation in Sibu is at Bukit Aup Jubilee Park, measuring 59 m above sea level.

=== Climate ===
Sibu has a tropical rainforest climate according to the Köppen climate classification. The Sibu town has high temperatures of 30–33 °C (86–91 °F) and low temperatures of 22.5–23 °C (72.5–73.4 °F). Annual rainfall is approximately 3,200 millimetres (130 in), with relative humidity between 80 and 87%. Sibu receives between 4 and 5 hours of sunlight per day with yearly average daily values of global solar radiation of 15.2 MJ/m^{2}. Cloud cover over Sibu reduces during the months of June and July (6.75 Oktas) but increases from November to February (7 Oktas).

Climate data for Sibu (1991–2020 normals)
Month	Jan	Feb	Mar	Apr	May	Jun	Jul	Aug	Sep	Oct	Nov	Dec	Year
Record high °C (°F)	35.1 (95.2)	35.0 (95.0)	35.6 (96.1)	35.7 (96.3)	36.6 (97.9)	36.6 (97.9)	37.1 (98.8)	36.6 (97.9)	36.5 (97.7)	36.2 (97.2)	35.0 (95.0)	35.3 (95.5)	37.1 (98.8)
Mean daily maximum °C (°F)	31.0 (87.8)	31.4 (88.5)	32.3 (90.1)	32.8 (91.0)	32.9 (91.2)	32.7 (90.9)	32.8 (91.0)	32.8 (91.0)	32.3 (90.1)	32.1 (89.8)	32.0 (89.6)	31.5 (88.7)	32.2 (90.0)
Daily mean °C (°F)	26.0 (78.8)	26.1 (79.0)	26.6 (79.9)	26.9 (80.4)	27.2 (81.0)	27.0 (80.6)	26.9 (80.4)	26.9 (80.4)	26.6 (79.9)	26.4 (79.5)	26.4 (79.5)	26.2 (79.2)	26.6 (79.9)
Mean daily minimum °C (°F)	23.2 (73.8)	23.2 (73.8)	23.4 (74.1)	23.6 (74.5)	23.8 (74.8)	23.6 (74.5)	23.3 (73.9)	23.3 (73.9)	23.2 (73.8)	23.3 (73.9)	23.3 (73.9)	23.3 (73.9)	23.4 (74.1)
Record low °C (°F)	18.5 (65.3)	19.5 (67.1)	20.0 (68.0)	21.5 (70.7)	21.6 (70.9)	21.0 (69.8)	20.5 (68.9)	20.2 (68.4)	20.9 (69.6)	20.8 (69.4)	21.4 (70.5)	21.0 (69.8)	18.5 (65.3)
Average precipitation mm (inches)	440.2 (17.33)	337.3 (13.28)	336.1 (13.23)	292.8 (11.53)	242.7 (9.56)	219.6 (8.65)	179.5 (7.07)	222.4 (8.76)	230.5 (9.07)	276.2 (10.87)	362.2 (14.26)	417.8 (16.45)	3,557.2 (140.05)
Average precipitation days (≥ 1.0 mm)	20.7	15.6	16.4	16.4	15.5	13.0	11.8	13.0	14.8	18.3	20.1	21.1	196.7
Average relative humidity (%)	86	85	86	84	85	83	82	84	84	85	84	87	84
Mean monthly sunshine hours	133	132	152	175	190	183	198	176	145	163	162	149	1,958
Mean daily sunshine hours	4.2	4.7	4.9	5.9	6.2	6.3	6.4	5.8	5.0	5.4	5.4	4.8	5.4
Source 1: World Meteorological Organization
Source 2: Deutscher Wetterdienst (extremes 1997-2003, humidity 1998–1999, daily sun 1971-1990), Ogimet

== Demographics ==
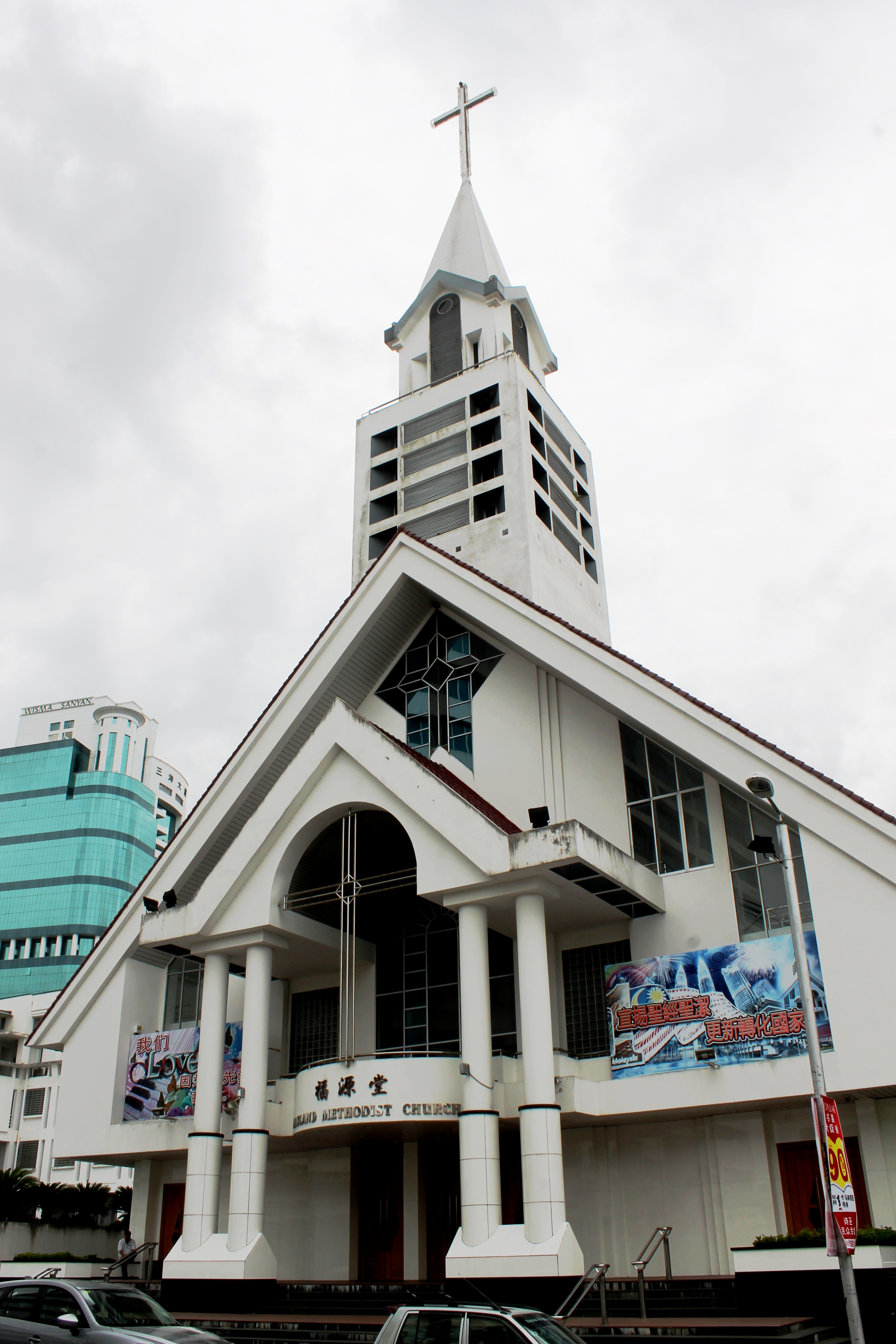
Masland Methodist Church

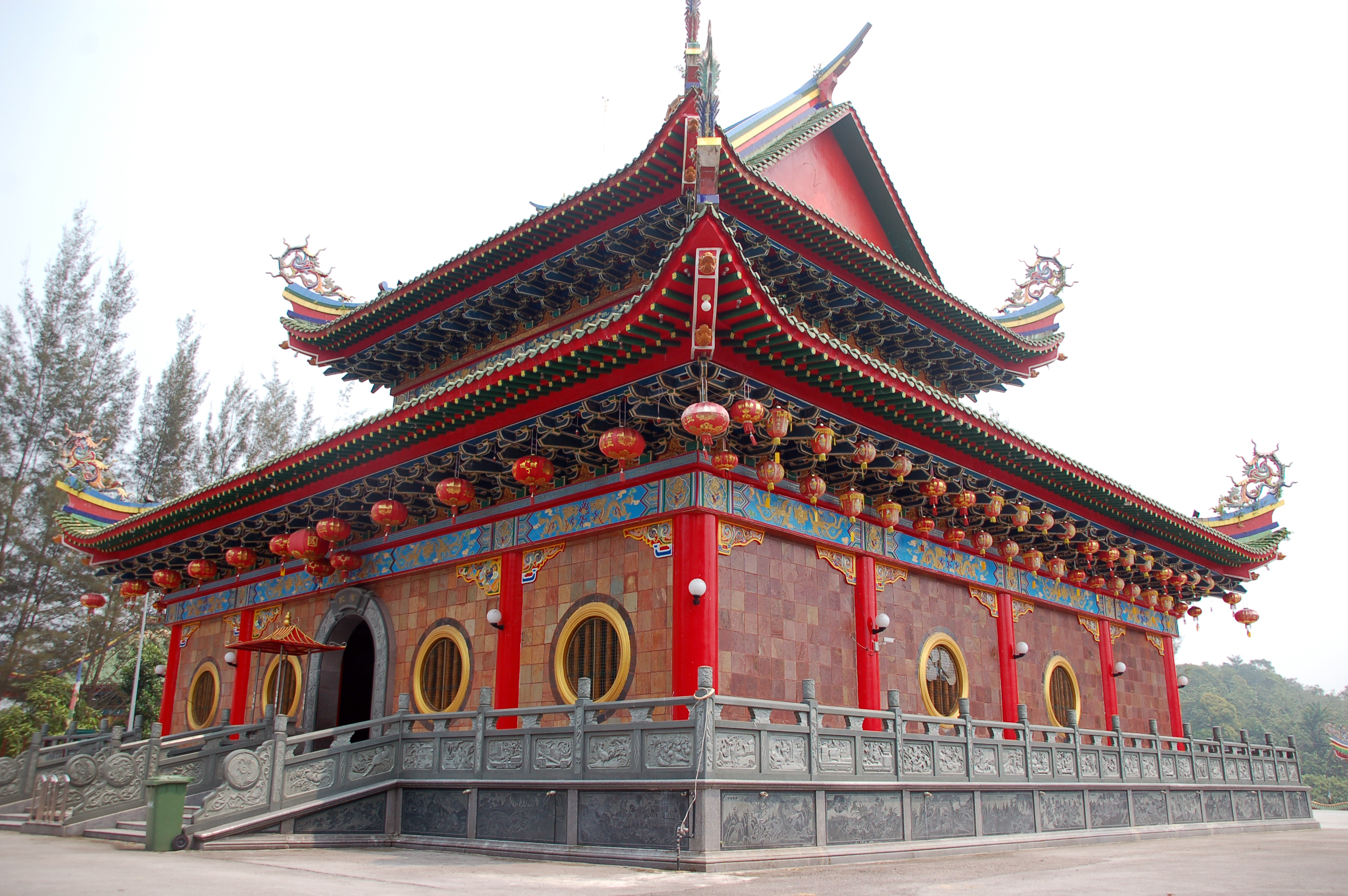
Jade Dragon Temple

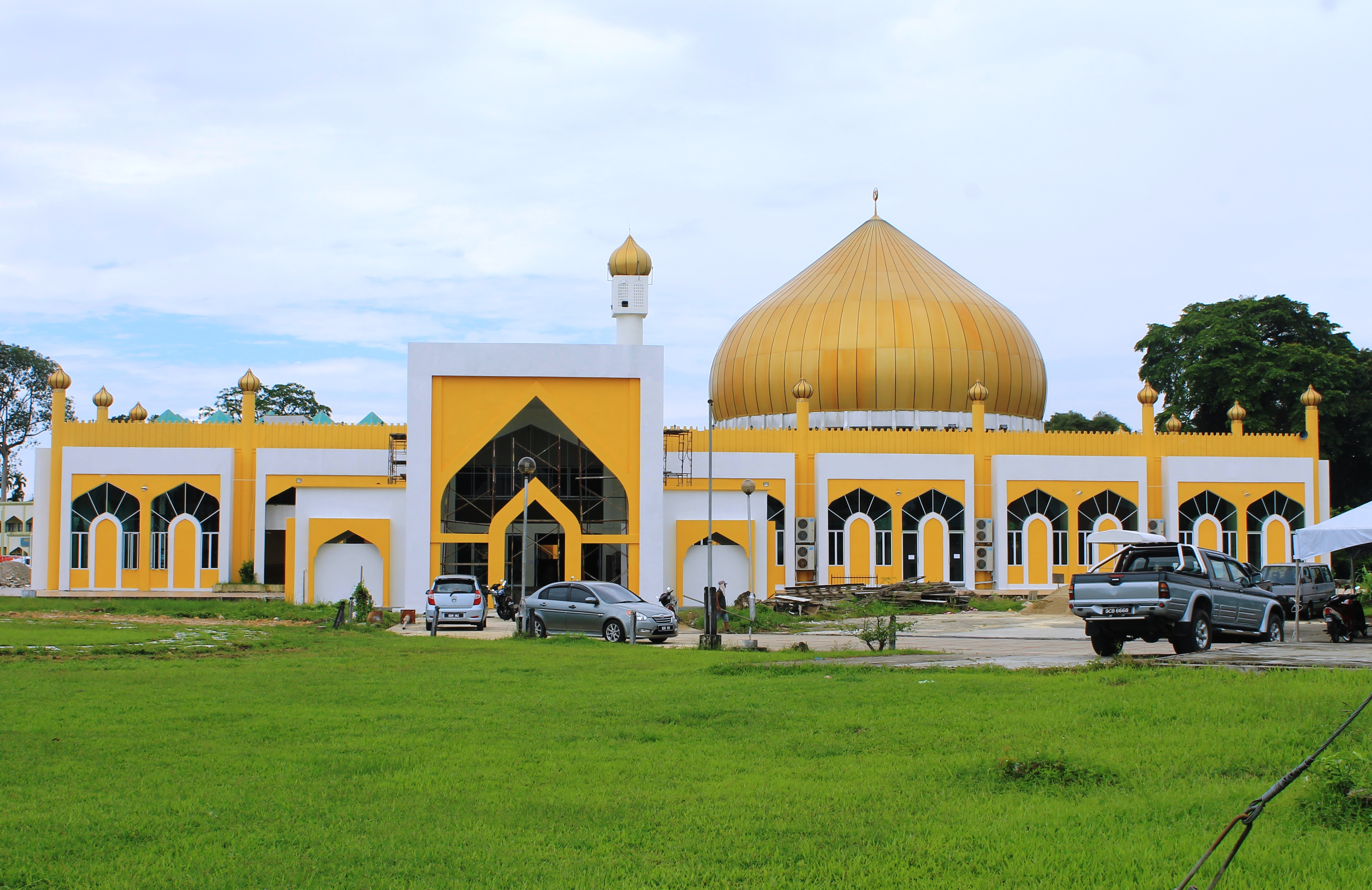
An-Nur Mosque

The change in Sibu's population since 1947 is shown below:

Year	1947	1960	1970	1980	1991	2000	2010
Total population	9,983	29,630	49,298	85,231	133,479	166,322	162,676

=== Ethnicity ===
Ethnic composition in Sibu
Ethnic group	Percent
Chinese	52.1%
Iban	17.6%
Malay	15.1%
Other Bumiputera	10.9%
Melanau	9.8%
Others	5.5%

According to the 2010 Malaysian census, the town of Sibu (excluding suburban area) has total population of 162,676. Chinese (52.1%, 82,019) is the largest ethnic group in the town, followed by indigenous people (35.01%, 56,949), non-Malaysians (1.99%, 3,236), and Indians (0.37%, 598). Among the indigenous tribes, there are Iban (28,777), Malays (24,646), Melanau (16,028), Bidayuh (3,337), and other indigenous tribes (1874). A majority of the non-Malaysians are Indonesian workers employed at plywood and sawmills factories. There are also a number of illegal workers employed by syndicates to tap rubber. A number of foreign Chinese nationals and Indonesians are also working in massage parlours.

=== Languages ===
Since the majority of the town population is made up of Fuzhounese, Hokkien and Hakka Chinese, Mandarin Chinese being the lingua franca of all three dialect groups and usage of dialects such as the Fuzhou dialect, Hakka and Hokkien are commonly spoken among the Chinese community. The majority of Sibu Chinese are multilingual and are able to communicate in Sarawak Malay, the indigenous native Iban language and English. Indigenous languages such as Sarawak Malay, Melanau, Bidayuh and Iban are also spoken.

=== Religion ===
Unlike the other towns in Malaysia, the majority of the Chinese population in Sibu are Christians while other Chinese practice Buddhism, Taoism, and Confucianism. Many of the Iban population in Sibu are Christians. Malays and Melanaus are Muslims. Respective religious groups are free to hold their processions in the town. Several notable religious buildings in the town are Sacred Heart Cathedral, Masland Methodist Church, Tua Pek Kong Temple, Al-Qadim Mosque and An-Nur Mosque. Yu Lung San Tien En Si or Jade Dragon Temple is located at KM26 Sibu-Bintulu Road. The temple combined Buddhism, Taoism and Confucianism under one roof. It is claimed to be the largest temple in Southeast Asia.

== Economy ==
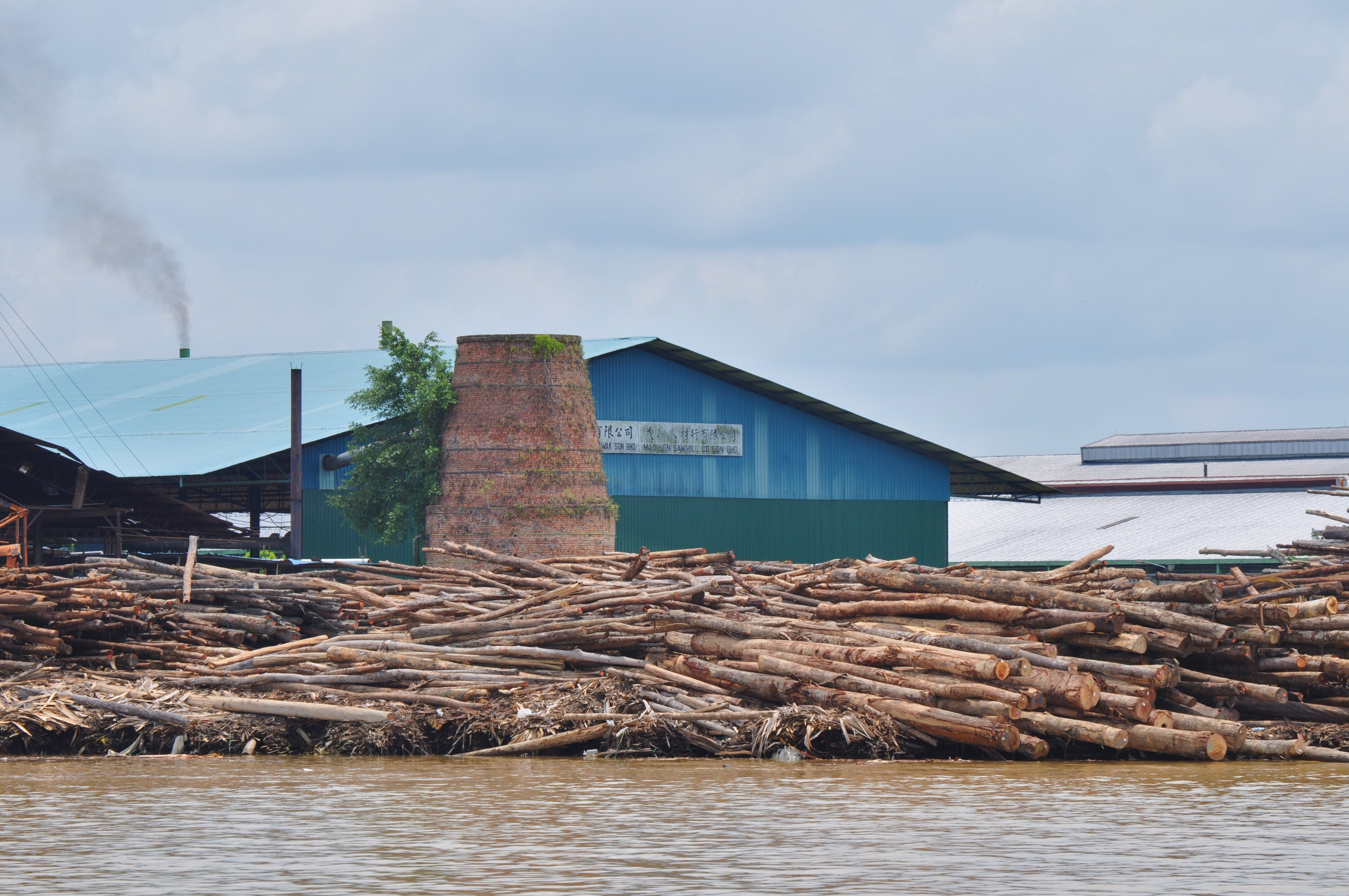
A pile of logs in front of a sawmill near the Rajang river.

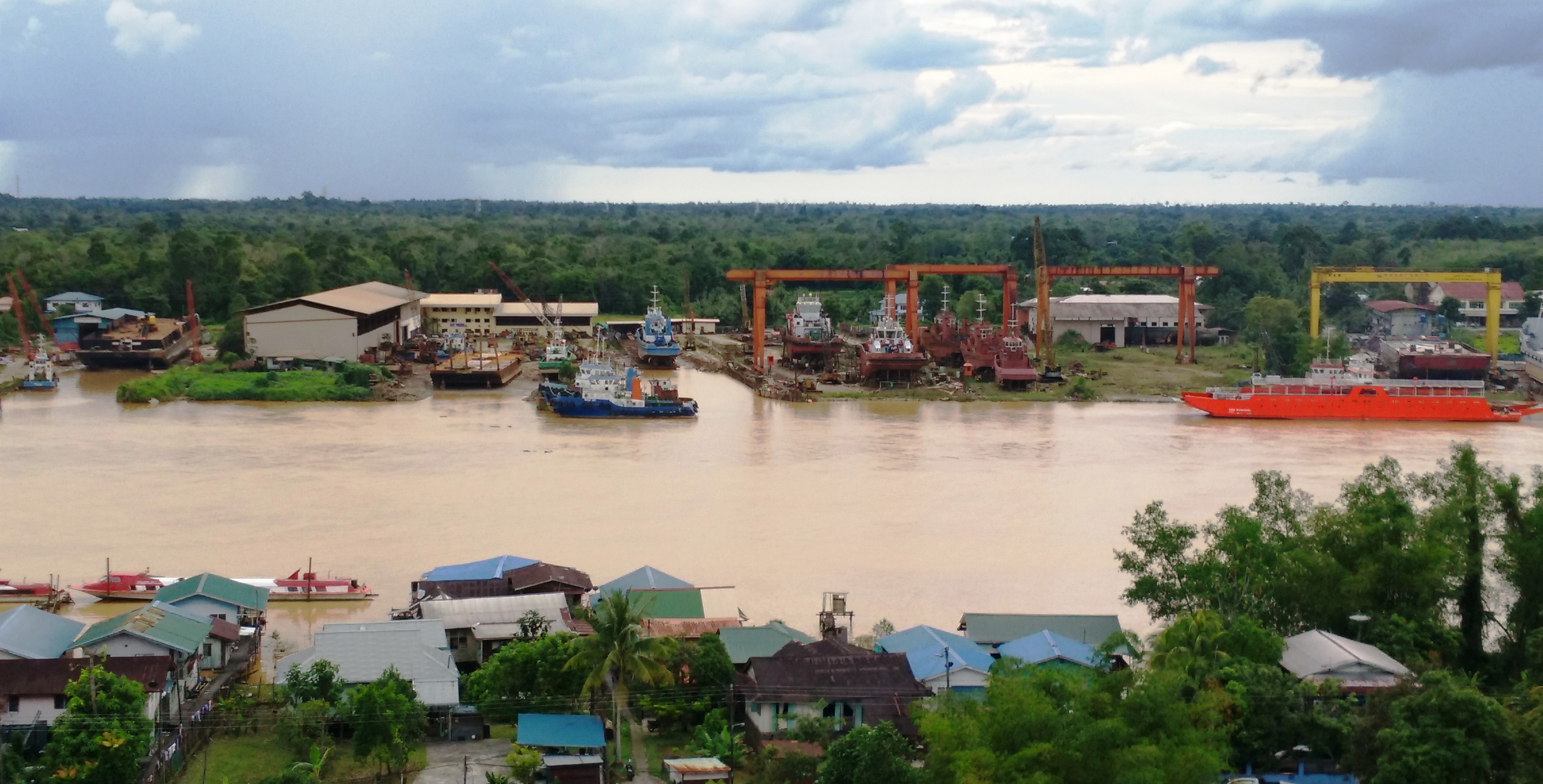
Shipyard along the Igan river.

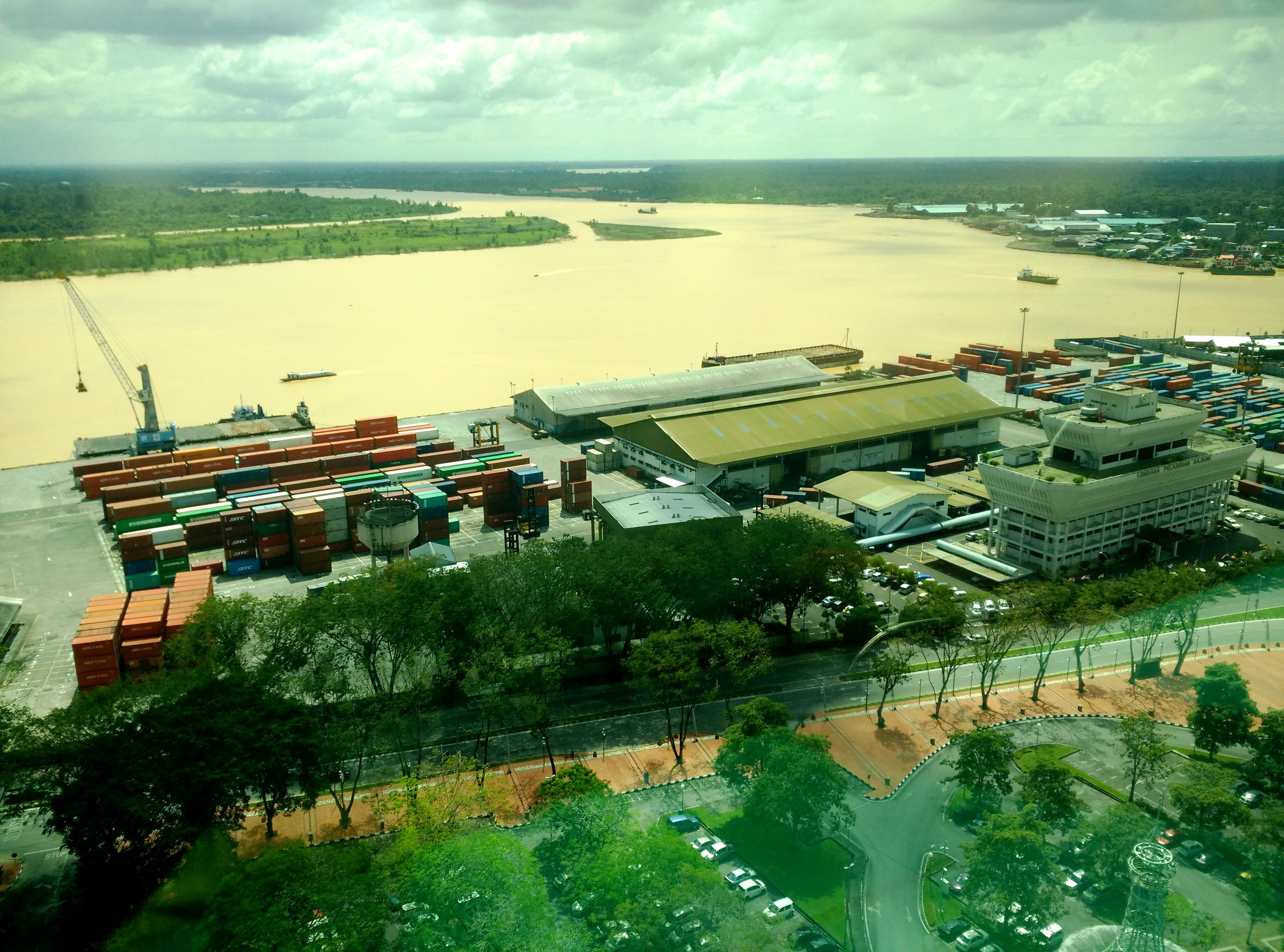
Rajang Port Authority and port facilities.

In the early days, Fuzhounese settlers in Sibu tried to convert the town into a rice cultivation centre. However, this vision did not materialise because the soil was not suitable for rice cultivation. In August 1909, Charles Brooke agreed to grant land titles to Sibu Chinese farmers and encouraged them to cultivate rubber plantations. The rise of rubber prices from 1909 to 1911 had encouraged another 2,000 Fuzhounese settlers to come to Sibu. The demand for rubber rose again during Korean War between 1950 and 1953 and has benefited Sibu rubber plantations. Local farmers later used the profits from rubber plantations into setting up shops at Sungai Merah and Durin bazaars and involve in more profitable timber industry. During the Sarawak Communist Insurgency in the 1970s, rural farmers had to abandon their rubber plantations because of martial law declared by the state government which forbade them for helping the communists operating in the jungles.

The timber industry in Sibu flourished during the 1940s and 1950s and its economic importance surpassed rubber plantations in the 1960s. Several global timber conglomerates such as the Rimbunan Hijau Group, Ta Ann Holdings Berhad, Sanyan Group, WTK, The Sarawak Company, and Asia Plywood Company set up their headquarters in Sibu. Timber processing and exports become the main economic driving force in Sibu. Development of the timber industry in Sibu has been supported by loans given by the earliest Chinese banks in Sibu such as Wah Tat Bank (1929), Hock Hua Bank (1952), and Kong Ming Bank (1965). Following the introduction of "Banking and Financial Institutions Act of 1989" (BAFIA) by the Malaysian federal government, Kong Ming Bank was acquired by EON Bank in 1992, followed by the merger of Wah Tat Bank with Hong Leong Bank and the merger of Hock Hua Bank with Public Bank Berhad in the year 2000. In 1958, HSBC started its banking operation in Kuching, followed by Sibu in 1959. It was responsible for supporting several timber conglomerates in Sibu such as WTK and Ta Ann Holdings Berhad. In November 2013, HSBC decided to close down all its commercial banking sectors in Sarawak after the bank was alleged for supporting non-sustainable logging operations in Sarawak.

Shipbuilding business in Sibu started in the 1930s to supply wooden boats for river and coastal navigation. It flourished in 1970s and 1980s along with increase in exports of tropical timber from Sarawak. It later shifted its focus into steel boat building. Some of the vessels in demand are tug boats for towing logs, barges for carrying logs, anchor handlers, Offshore Support Vessels (OSV), ferries, and express boats for carrying passengers. Most of the boats built are of small and medium in size. There are a total of 40 shipyards in Sibu. A majority of the workers are welders. In 2003, 17 of the shipyards were relocated to Rantau Panjang Integrated Shipyard Shipbuilding Industrial Zone, Sibu. This included Yong Chin Kui, Far East, and TuongAik. The boats built in Sibu are often exported to neighbouring state of Sabah, Peninsular Malaysia, Singapore, Indonesia and United Arab Emirates. In the year 1991, a total of US$50 million was earned for shipbuilding business in Sibu. In 2011, Sibu ship exports stood at RM 525 million. Sibu is also the only city in Sarawak to possess a vehicle assembly plant. The plant is operated by N.B. Heavy Industries Sdn. Bhd., and it has been assembling Ankai, BeiBen, Golden Dragon, Huanghai Bus and JAC commercial vehicles since 2010. Sibu has two industrial areas: Upper Lanang Industrial estate (Mixed Light Industries) and Rantau Panjang Ship Building Industrial Zone.

There are two river ports at Sibu: Sibu port and Sungai Merah port, located at 113 km and 116 km along from the mouth of the Rajang river, respectively. Sibu port has maximum gross tonnage (GT) of 10,000 tonnes while Sungai Merah port has a maximum GT of 2,500 tonnes. Sibu port is used mainly for handling timber and agricultural products while Sungai Merah port is used for handling fuel oil products. Rajang Port Authority (RPA) is located at Sibu port operation centre.

RPA has earned a total revenue of RM 30.1 million and profit of RM 5 million in the year 2012.

== Transport ==
=== Land ===
Roads in Sibu are under the jurisdiction of Sibu Municipal Council (SMC). Some of the notable roads in Sibu are Brooke Drive, Archer Street, and Wong Nai Siong Street. Kwong Ann roundabout is located near Brooke Drive in town centre while Bukit Lima roundabout is located near Wong King Huo Street in the uptown area. Sibu is also connected to other major towns and cities in Sarawak such as Kuching by Pan Borneo Highway. In early 2011, Sibu-Tanjung Manis Highway was opened. In April 2006, Lanang Bridge connecting Sibu to Sarikei and Bintangor across the Rajang River was opened. Toll-free Durin Bridge was opened in October 2006 connecting Sibu to other places such as Julau. The Durin bridge is located near the satellite township of Sibu Jaya.

==== Public transport ====
===== Local Bus =====
Route No.	Operating Route	Operator
1	Lanang Road STP	Lanang Bus
1	Kampung Bahagia	Teku Bus
1A+16	Sibu Wharf-Sungai Merah-Indah-Kampung Bahagia-Rantau Panjang Jaya	Sungei Merah
3	Sibu Wharf-Sungai Merah-Taman Bukit Aup Jubilee-Engkalat	Teku Bus
4	Sibu Wharf-Pasai Siong	Teku Bus
5A	Hospital	Lanang Bus
6	Sibu Wharf-Sungai Merah-Teku-Trusan	Teku Bus
7	Hospital	Teku Bus
8A	Bintangor-Sarikei	Borneo Bus
8B	Sarikei-Sibu	Borneo Bus
11	Lanang Road STP	Sungei Merah
15	Sibu Jaya	Lanang Bus
17	Sibu Jaya	Sungei Merah
20	Sibu-Kanowit	Lanang Express
23	Sibu Wharf-Tanjung Manis-Belawai	Lanang Bus

The town of Sibu has two bus stations. The local bus station is located at the waterfront near the Sibu wharf terminal. The long-distance bus station is located at Pahlawan Street, near the Sungai Antu region. Jaya Li Hua Commercial Centre and Medan Hotel are located next to the long-distance bus station. The local bus station at the waterfront serves the town area, Sibu Airport, Sibu Jaya, Kanowit, and Sarikei. Lanang Bus serves the connection between the local bus station and the long-distance bus station while Panduan Hemat buses serves Sibu Airport and satellite township of Sibu Jaya. On the other hand, the long-distance bus station serves Kuching, Bintulu, and Miri via the Pan Borneo Highway. Some of the buses serving at the long-distance bus station are Biaramas, Suria Bus, and Borneo Highway Express.

Taxis in Sibu operates 24 hours a day. Taxis can be found at the airport, big hotels, taxi stands at the wharf terminal, and at Lintang Street. Taxi services are also offered for travel to nearby regions such as Mukah, Bawang Assan, Sarikei, and Bintangor. Kong Teck car rental is available at the airport.

In May 2017, ride-sharing service company GrabCar was launched in Sibu.

=== Water ===
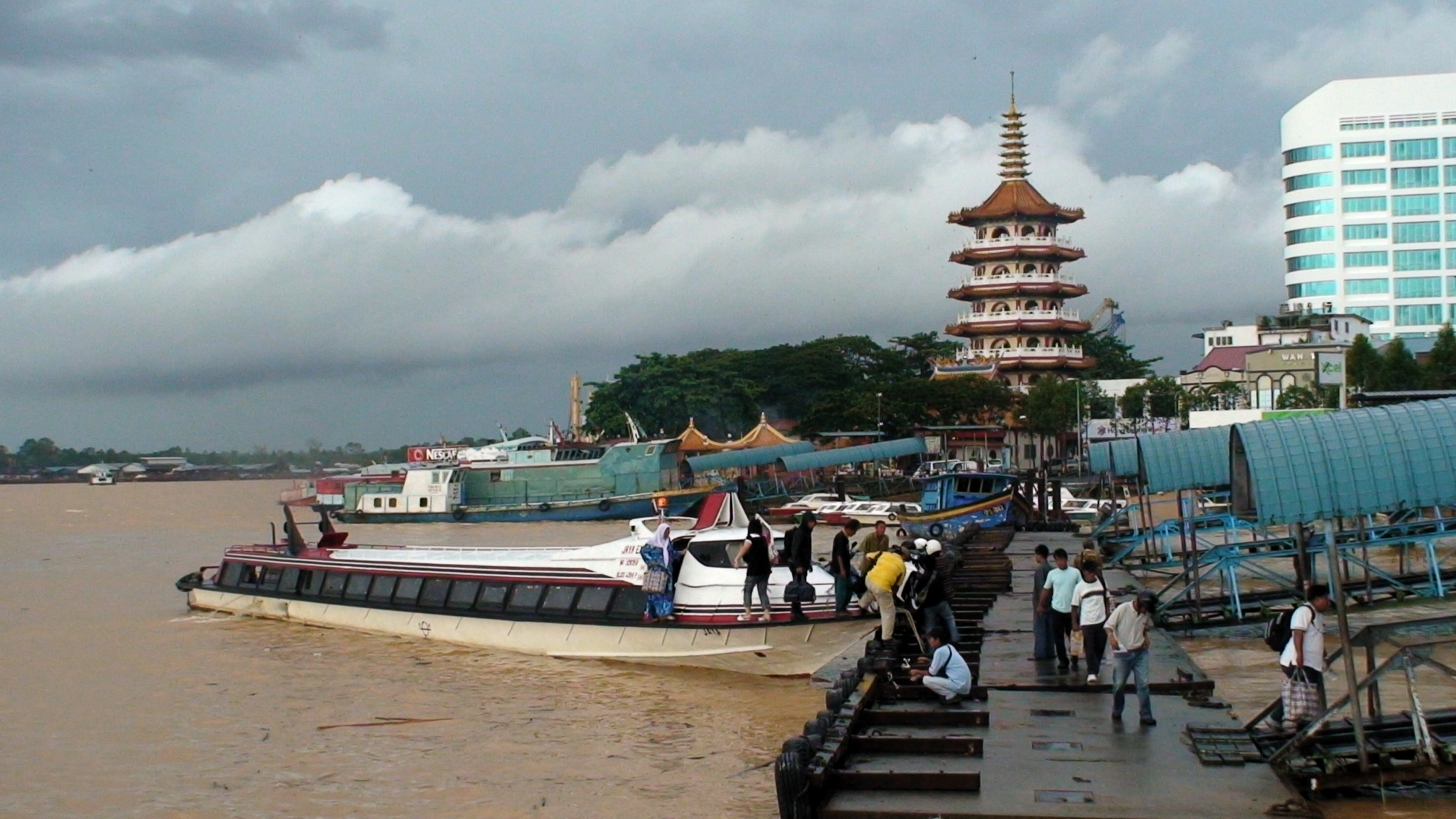
Scene at the Sibu wharf terminal.

Sibu wharf terminal is located at Kho Peng Long Street near the Rajang river waterfront. It provides an alternative means of transport for the people living along the Rajang River. Among the destinations that can be reached by express boats from Sibu includes Belaga, Dalat, Daro, Kapit, Kanowit, Kuching, Sarikei, and Song. Sibu floating market which is made up of several large boats can also be seen from the wharf terminal. The boats are responsible to carry groceries to rural communities living along the river and do not have access to roads. There used to be a Pandaw River Cruise which operated along the Rajang River from Sibu to Pelagus Rapids Resort but its operation was terminated in 2012 due to logistical and operational difficulties.

=== Air ===
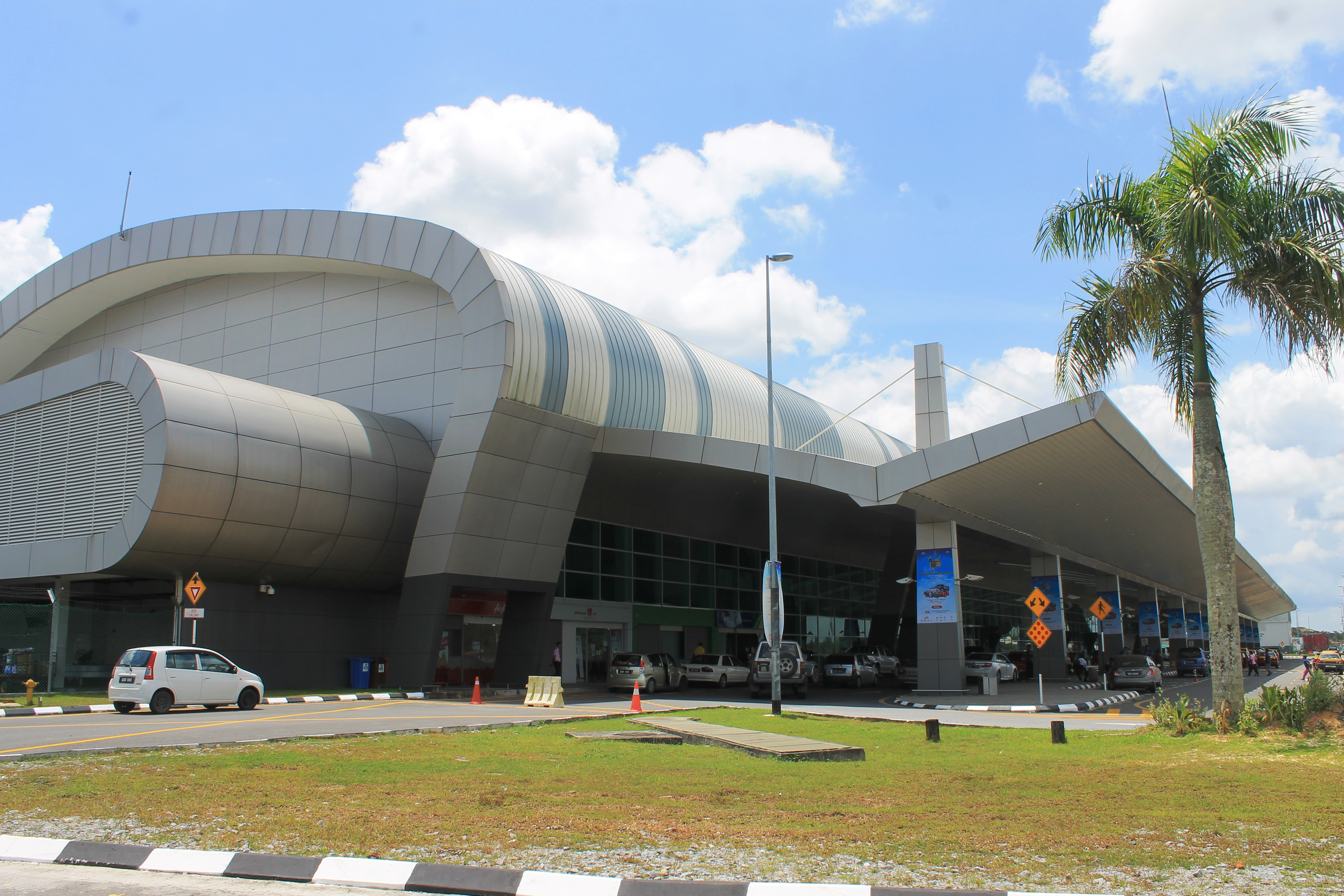
Sibu Airport terminal building.

Sibu Airport was built in 1994, located at 25 km from the town of Sibu and 1 km from the satellite township of Sibu Jaya. In 2008, the airport handled 831,772 passengers on 14,672 flights and 735 metric tonnes of cargo. In April 2010, the airport was allocated RM 130 million by the Malaysian federal government for the upgrade of the terminal building. The airport terminal building is the second largest in Sarawak after the Kuching International Airport. The airport has a 2.75 km runway and it serves Malaysia Airlines, Air Asia, and MASWings with direct flights to all major towns in Sarawak, such as Miri, Bintulu, Kuching and national destinations such as Kota Kinabalu, Kuala Lumpur, and Johor Bahru. In October 2011, Firefly airline terminated its services in Sarawak while Malindo Air terminated its services to Sibu Airport in June 2014 due to low number of passengers.

== Other utilities ==
=== Courts of law, legal enforcement, and crime ===
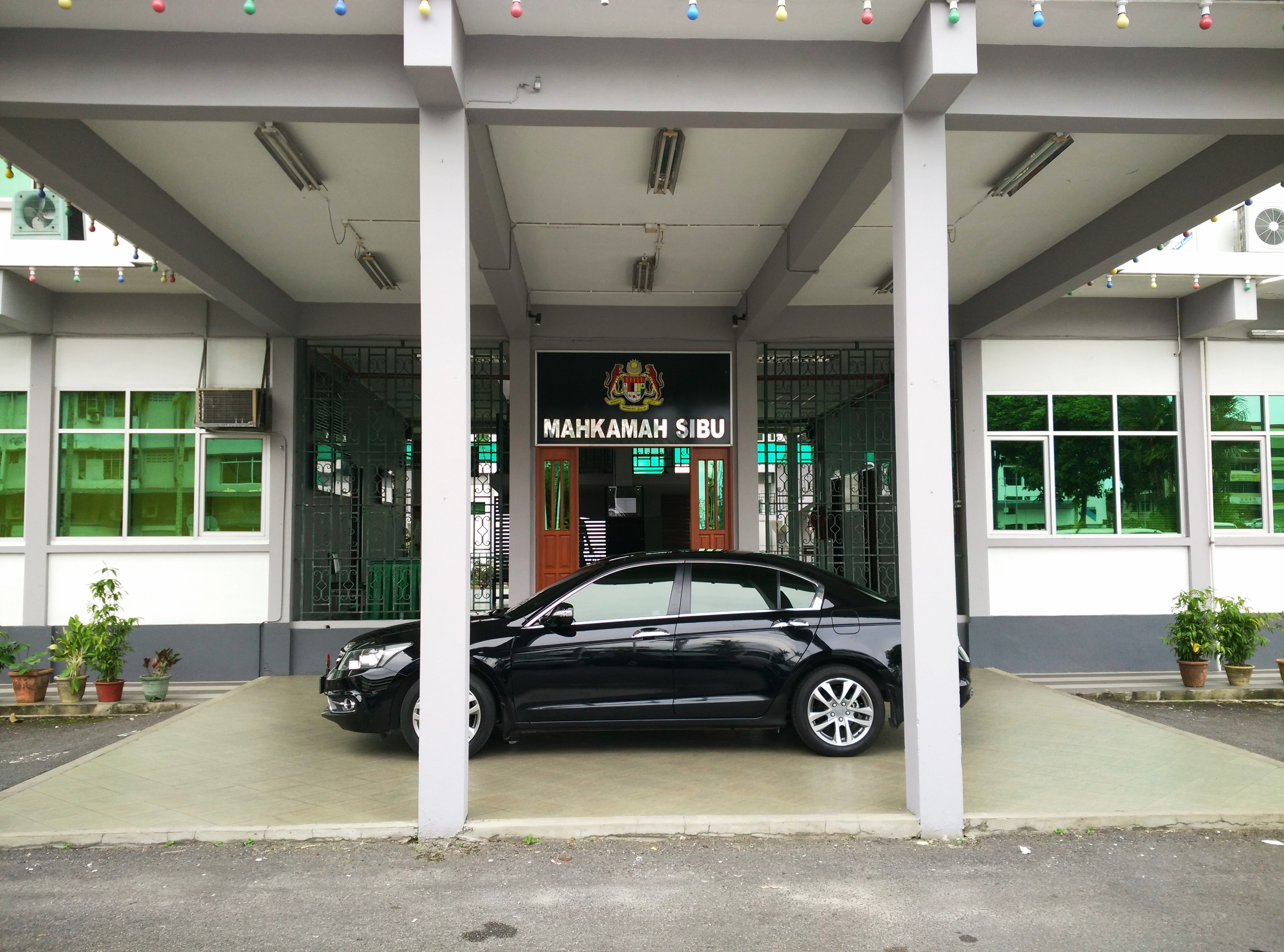
The Sibu court complex

The court complex is located at Tun Abang Haji Openg Street, Sibu. It contains the High Court, Sessions Court, and the Magistrate Court. The Sibu town also has a Syariah Court located at Kampung Nyabor Street with jurisdictions in Sibu, Kanowit and Selangau districts. There is one district police headquarters at Tun Abang Haji Openg Street. The Sibu central police station is located at Kampung Nyabor Street. Sungai Merah police station and Lanang police station are also located in Sibu town area. There is also a prison in Sibu.

Tiong King Sing, an MP from Bintulu, has voiced concerns about gangsterism in Sarawak especially the Sibu town back in 2007. As a result, "Operation Cantas Kenyalang" was started in 2008 to clamp down gangsterism in Sarawak. In September 2013, Sibu police chief announced that "Lee Long", "Sungai Merah", and "Tua Chak Lee" gangs ceased to exist and Sibu town is free from organised gangsterism. There were 25 gangster groups in Sibu back in 2007; there are 7 groups as of 9 October 2013. In September 2014, Royal Malaysian Police headquarter at Bukit Aman, Kuala Lumpur, stated that 16 local gangster groups are still active in Sarawak especially in Sibu but they do not pose any serious security threats. This raised new concerns that such groups still pose a serious security risk in Sibu town and Sarawak in general.

=== Healthcare ===
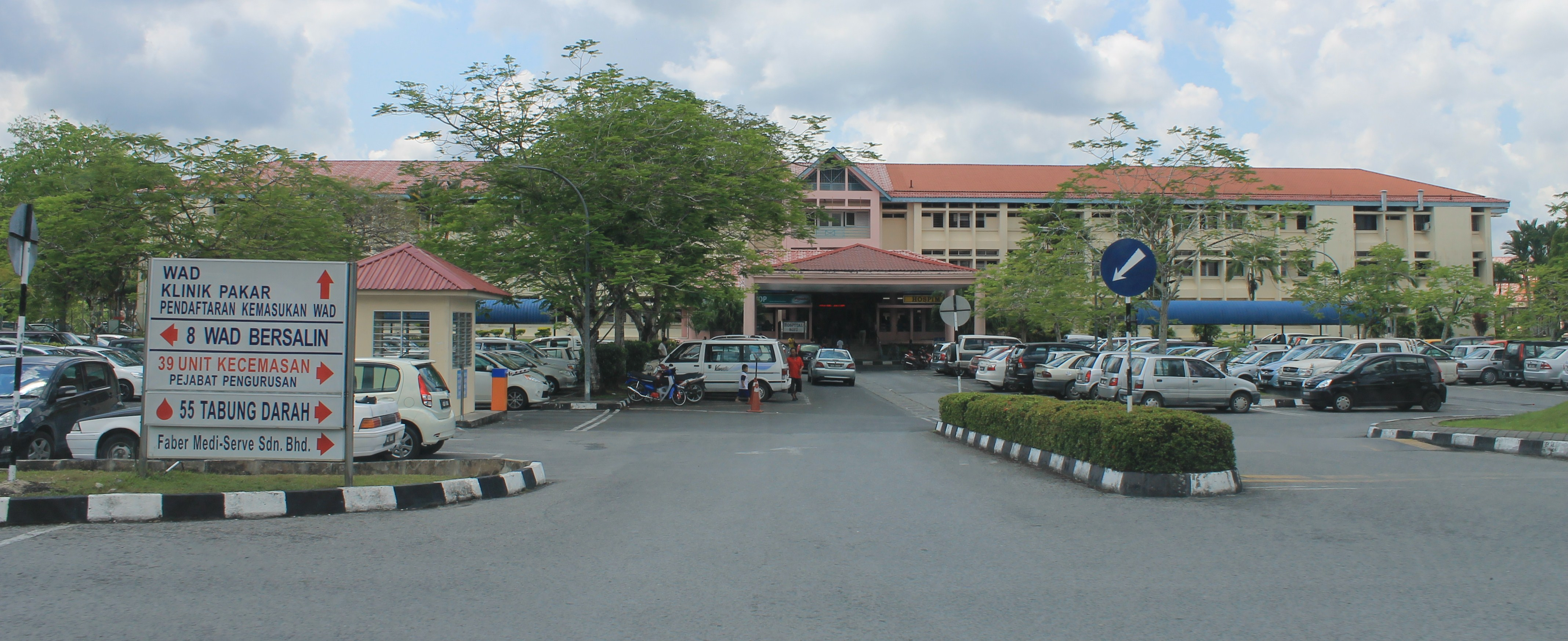
The Sibu Hospital.

Sibu Hospital is the second largest hospital in Sarawak and the secondary referral hospital for the central region of Sarawak which includes 5 divisions: Sibu, Kapit, Mukah, Sarikei, and Betong. There are 8 district hospitals in these divisions that are referred to Sibu. Sibu Hospital is also a teaching hospital for undergraduates from Universiti Malaysia Sarawak (UNIMAS) and SEGi University. There are also two private medical centres in Sibu: KPJ Sibu Specialist Medical Centre and Rejang Medical Centre.

Lanang and Oya Polyclinics are located in Sibu. There are also five community clinics in Sibu. The Bandong Community clinic became the first Community Clinic nationwide to offer echocardiography screening. There are also several pharmacy outlets in Sibu: B Y Chan pharmacy, Central Pharmacy, Lot 9 Pharmacy near by Delta Mall and Cosway Pharmacy.

=== Education ===
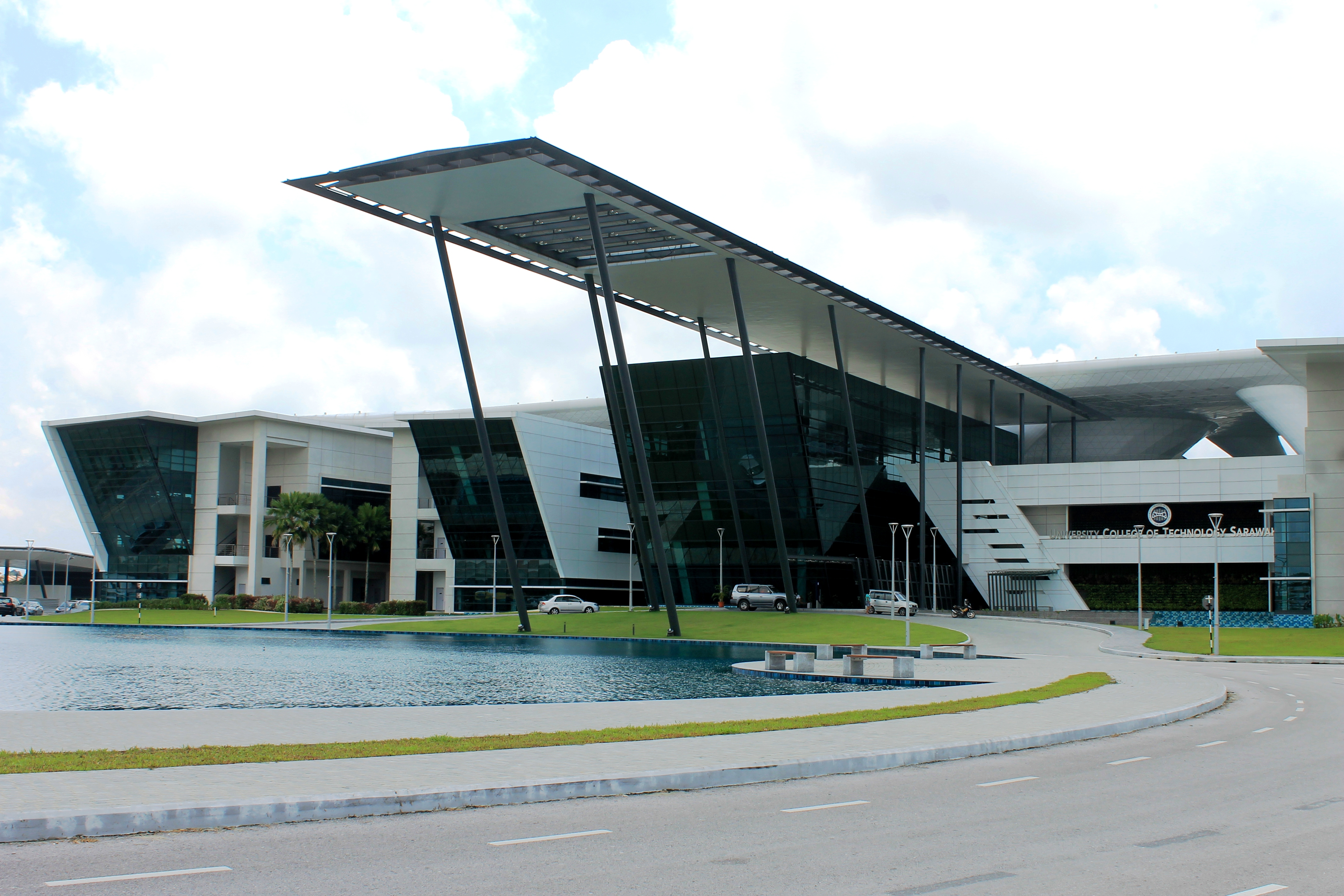
University of Technology Sarawak (UTS).

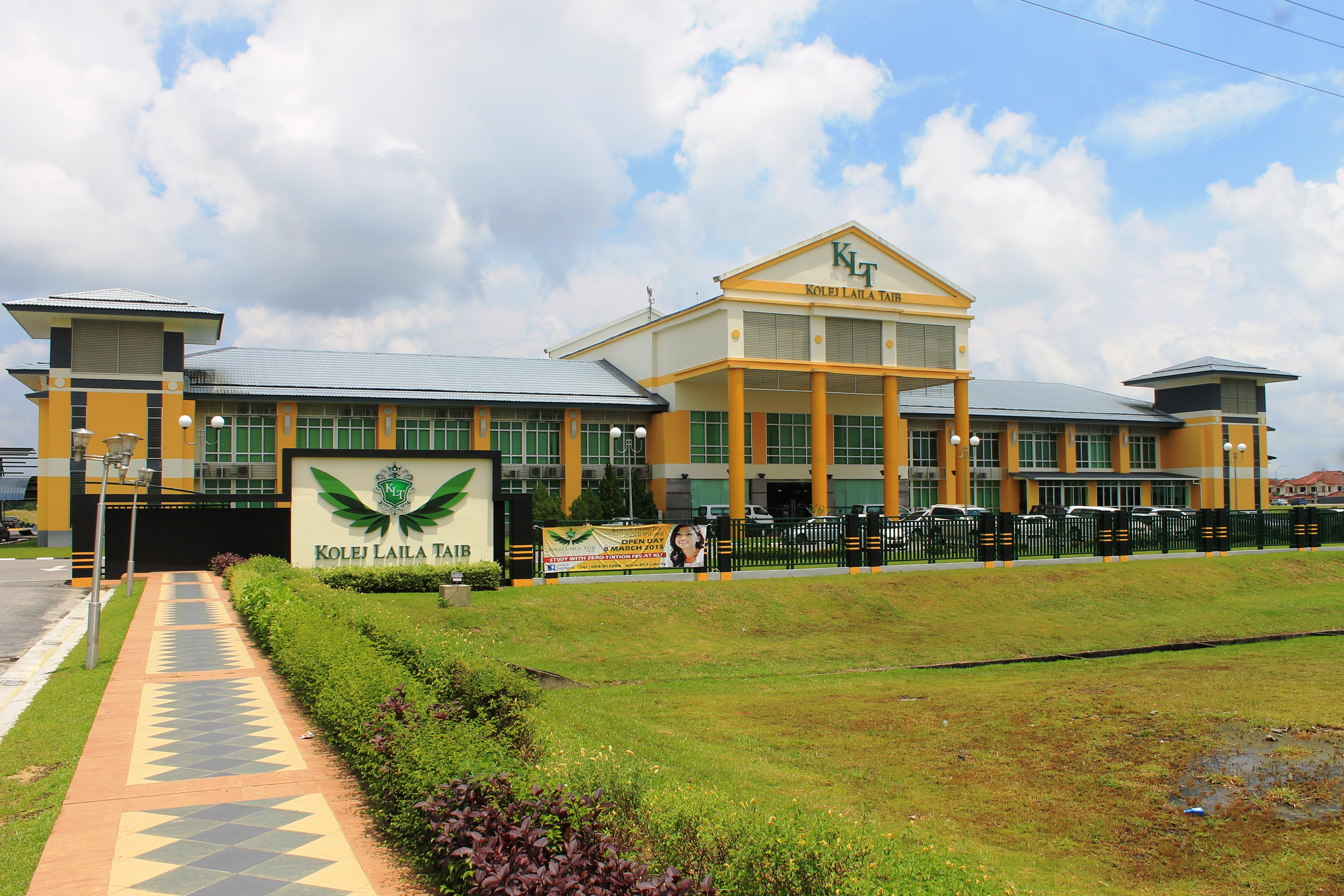
Kolej Laila Taib, Sibu.

Sibu has about 85 primary schools and 23 secondary schools. The Sibu primary and secondary schools under the National Education System are managed by Sibu District Education Office located at Brooke Drive, Sibu. The oldest school in Sibu is Sacred Heart High School which was formed in 1902 by Rev. Father Hopfgarther. This was followed by Rev James Hoover where he formed Methodist Anglo-Chinese School in 1903. The school later evolved into Methodist primary and secondary schools in 1947. Uk Daik primary school, built in 1926, is one of the oldest Chinese primary schools in Sibu. Built in 1954, St Mary primary school is the oldest English stream school in Sibu Division. Sibu also has five Chinese independent schools. The most notable ones are Catholic High School (1961) and Wong Nai Siong High School (1967). All the Chinese independent schools in Sibu are under the purview of The United Association of Private Chinese Secondary School, Sibu Division. In 2013, Woodlands International School opened in Sibu offering Cambridge International Examinations (CIE) course.

In 1997, United College Sarawak (UCS) was established in Sibu at Teku Street. It was renamed to Kolej Laila Taib (KLT) in 2010. This college offers business, accounting, civil engineering, architecture, Electrical and Electronic Engineering and quantity surveying courses. University College of Technology Sarawak (UCTS), located just opposite the KLT, commenced its maiden intake of new undergraduate students in September 2013. This university is established to provide human capital for the development of Sarawak Corridor of Renewable Energy (SCORE). In 1967, Pilley Memorial Secondary School was established in Sibu. In April 1991, the school was upgraded to Methodist Pilley Institute (MPI) and it started to offer accounting, business management, and computer science courses.

Sarawak Maritime Academy was formed under the Shin Yang Group of Companies. It offers Diploma in Nautical (DNS) and Diploma in Marine Engineering courses. Sacred Heart College started to offer Diploma in Hotel Management courses in 2010. Rimbunan Hijau (RH) Academy was established in 2005 and it started to offer training in automotive, oil palm plantations, hospitality, and business management in 2007. Sibu Nursing College and ITA college offers nursing-related programmes. In 1954, the Methodist Theological School was established in Sibu. It is affiliated with Methodist Church in Malaysia and is accredited by the Association for Theological Education in South East Asia (ATESEA).

Long distance study centres (Pendidikan Jarak Jauh, PJJ) in Sibu are opened by Universiti Utara Malaysia (UUM) at Lanang and Universiti Putra Malaysia (UPM) at Sibu Jaya. Universiti Malaysia Sarawak (UNIMAS) opened its Centre for Academic Information Services (CAIS) – Integrated Learning Facilities (ILF) at Sibu for undergraduate medical students undergoing their training at Sibu Hospital. Open University Malaysia (OUM) also opens a Sibu Learning Centre. SEGi University has established its Clinical Campus in Sibu Hospital in 2014. This campus houses its Faculty of Medicine which offers a 5-year programme leading to a Bachelor of Medicine and Surgery (MBBS). The first 2 years of the programme is conducted at the main SEGi University Campus in Kota Damansara. Located in the Sibu Hospital complex Sibu Clinical Campus offers clinical training for the Third, Fourth and Final Year students. Besides Sibu Hospital clinical training are also conducted at Sarikei Hospital, government clinics and selected private clinics.

=== Libraries ===
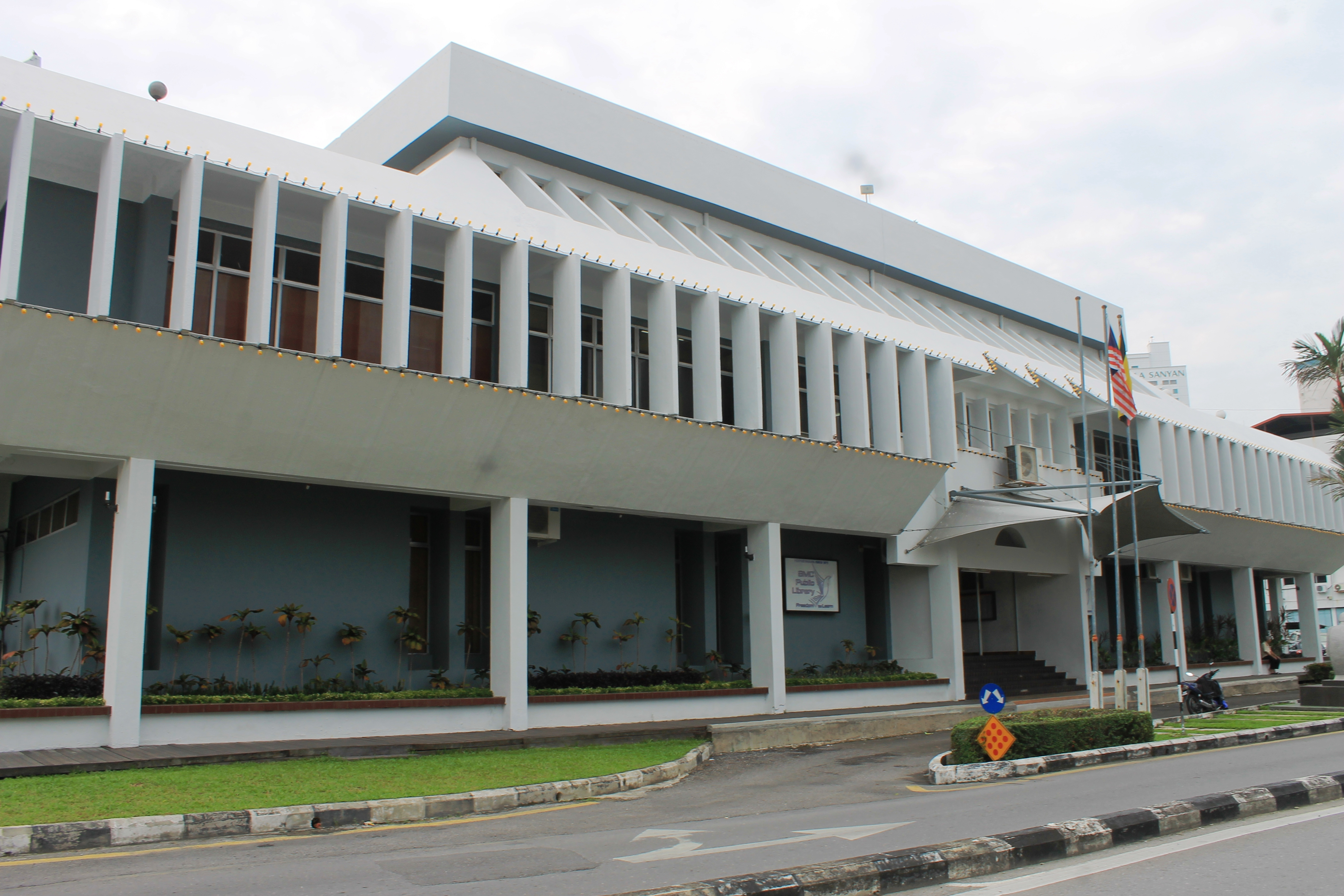
SMC public library.

The first public library in Sibu was started as Methodist Missionary Library in the 1950s. It was taken over by Sibu Urban District Council (SUDC) in 1955. It was moved to the present location at Keranji road in 1986 as SMC public library. The library underwent a major upgrade in 2014. Another public library named "Ling Zi Ming Cultural centre" (林子明文化館) was established by the local Chinese community under the Sibu Chinese Chamber of Commerce and Industry (SCCCI, 詩巫中華總商會) in 1980. It houses Chinese books collections. Another library named Sibu Jaya public library is located at the satellite township of Sibu Jaya, 26 km from the town of Sibu.

== Culture and leisure ==
=== Attractions and recreational spots ===
==== Cultural ====
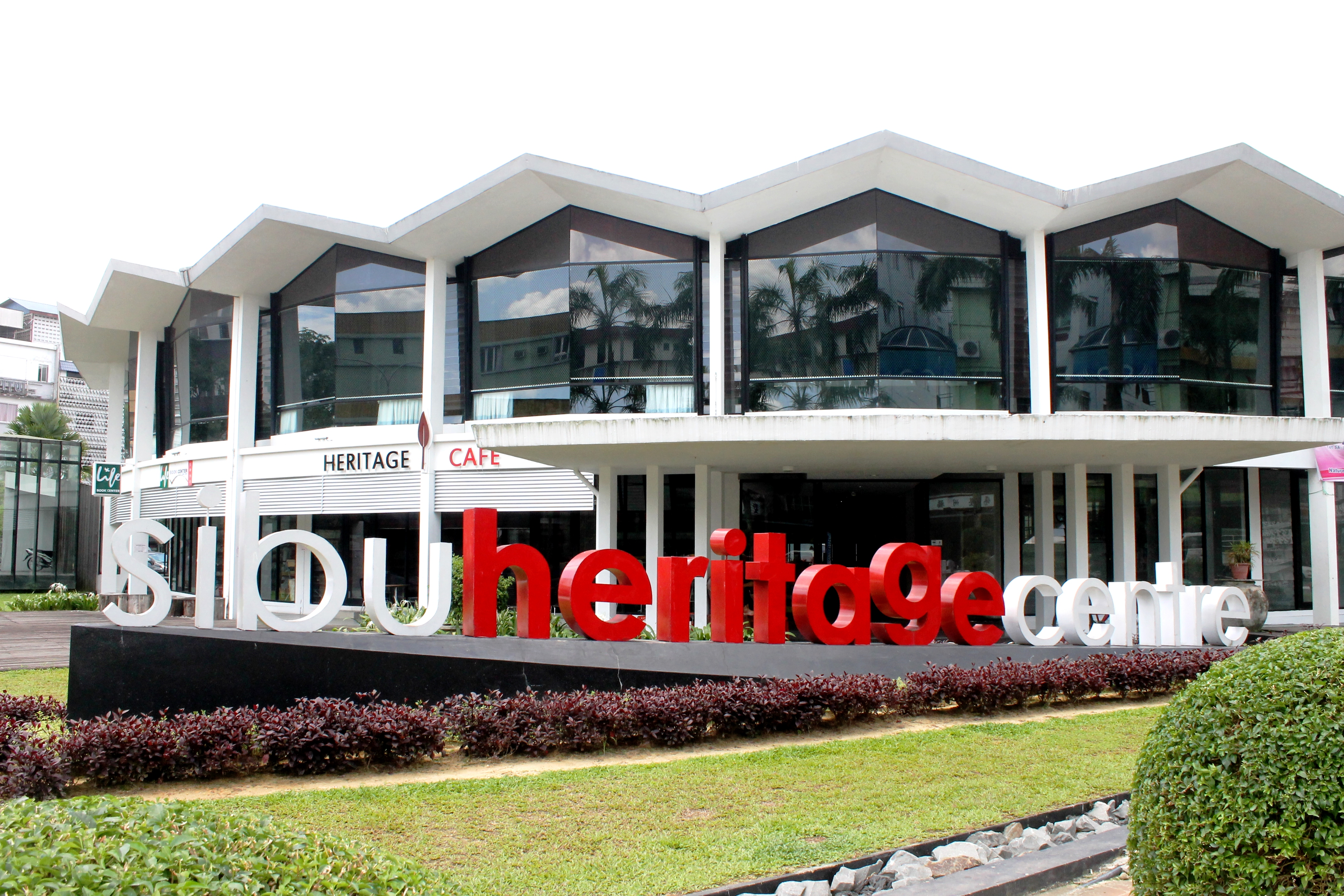
Sibu Heritage Centre

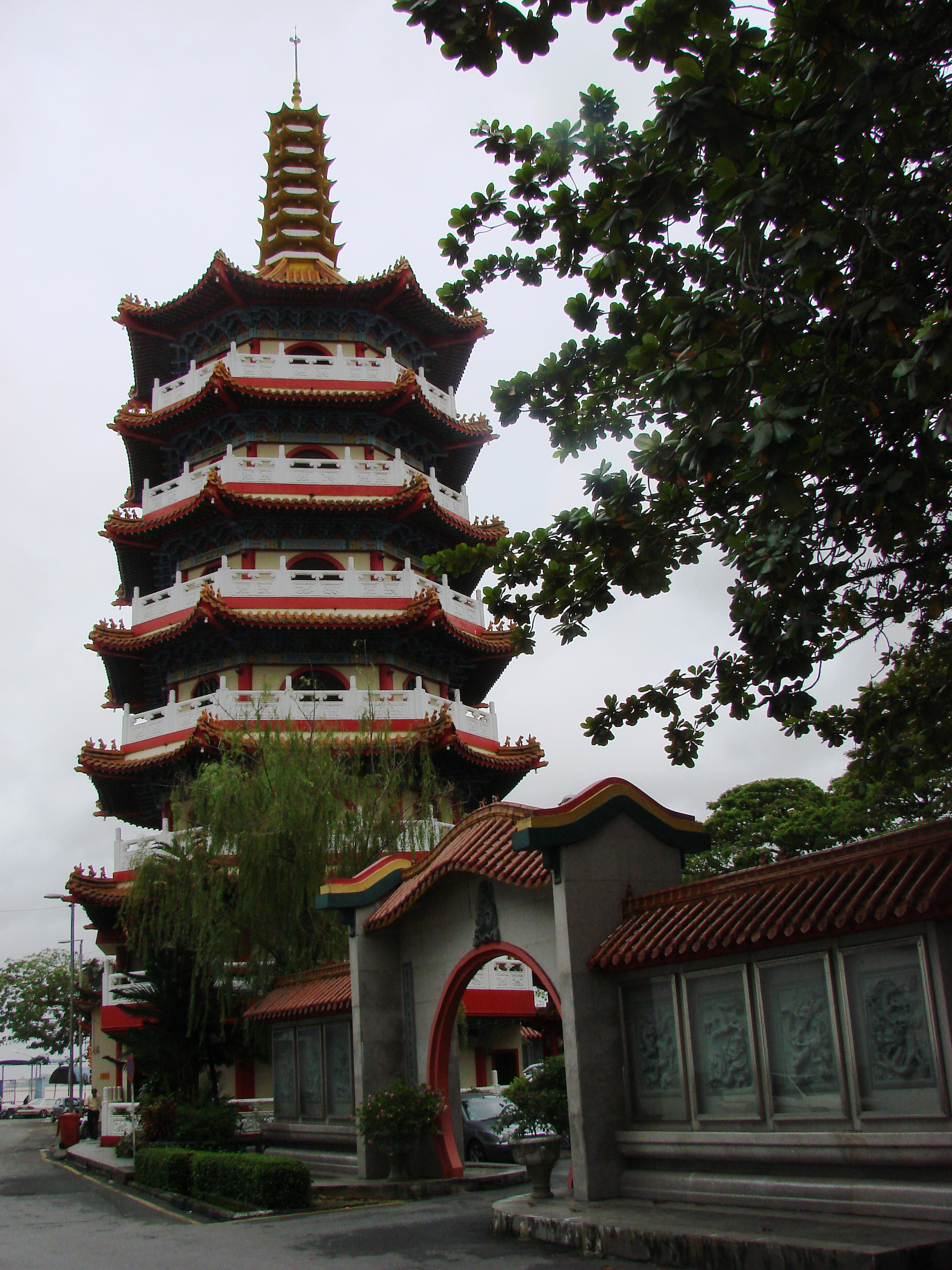
Tua Pek Kong Temple

Since 2005, Borneo Cultural Festival (BCF) is held by Sibu Municipal Council (SMC) in July every year at Sibu Town Square, for a period of 10 days. It is a celebration of traditional music, dances, contests, beauty pageant, food stalls, fun fairs, and product exhibitions. There are 3 separate stages for Iban, Chinese, and Malay performances. It draws around 20,000 people every year. BCF was stopped briefly in 2011 before it was resumed in 2012. Sibu has hosted the National Chinese Cultural Festival (全國華人文化節) twice: in 2001 (18th Festival) and 2009 (26th Festival) which lasted for 3 days. Among the activities organised during this festival were cultural village (a venue designated to showcase cultural heritages from various ethnicity), lantern riddles, cultural dances, Chinese songs, dragon dances, and Chinese calligraphy. Sibu International Dance Festival (SIDF) was started in 2012. It is usually held between June and September every year, which lasted for 5 days. It attracted around 14 to 18 international dance troupes for performances in Sibu. It includes activities such as workshops, conferences, outdoor performances, and a dance concert.

There are 9 Bawang Assan Iban longhouses which are 40 minutes away from the town of Sibu. The longhouses can be dated back from 18th century traditional longhouses to present day modern longhouses. Visitors can enjoy traditional rice wine tuak and other delicacies such as sarang semut, kain kebat, and pansuh. These Iban longhouses showcase their lifestyles, customs, traditional dance, and music. Homestays are also available at these longhouses. There are 3 ceramic factories in Sibu. Ceramic designs mainly depicts traditional culture of the natives.

==== Historical ====
Sibu Heritage Trail was launched in 2012 to include 9 landmarks in Sibu, which are: Sibu Heritage Centre, Sibu Old Mosque (Masjid Al-Qadim, built in 1883), Warriors Memorial Site (present burial site of Rosli Dhobi, near An-Nur Mosque), oldest Muslim cemetery, Lau King Howe Hospital Memorial Museum, Hoover Memorial Square, Tua Pek Kong Temple, and Sibu Central Market. All the 9 landmarks can be reached by 2 kilometres of walking distance from each other. Sibu Heritage Centre is housed in a former Sibu Town Hall. It displays the early beginnings of Sibu, Iban and Malay cultures, with Chinese porcelain and clay vases which can be dated back to the era of Imperial China. Tua Pek Kong Temple is a Buddhist and Taoist Temple which was established in 1870. The 7-storey Guanyin Pagoda (Goddess of Mercy) was built in the 1980s. The Lau King Howe Hospital Memorial Museum is the only medical museum in Malaysia. It displays dental, surgical, and obstetric services offered by the hospital from the 1950s to 1990s. Sungai Merah (Red River) Heritage Walk is the landmark of the earliest settlement of Fuzhounese in Sibu in 1901. There is a walking trail at the Sungai Merah river front leading up to Wong Nai Siong Memorial Garden. James Hoover Memorial Garden is also located near the Sungai Merah Heritage Walk.

==== Leisure and conservation areas ====
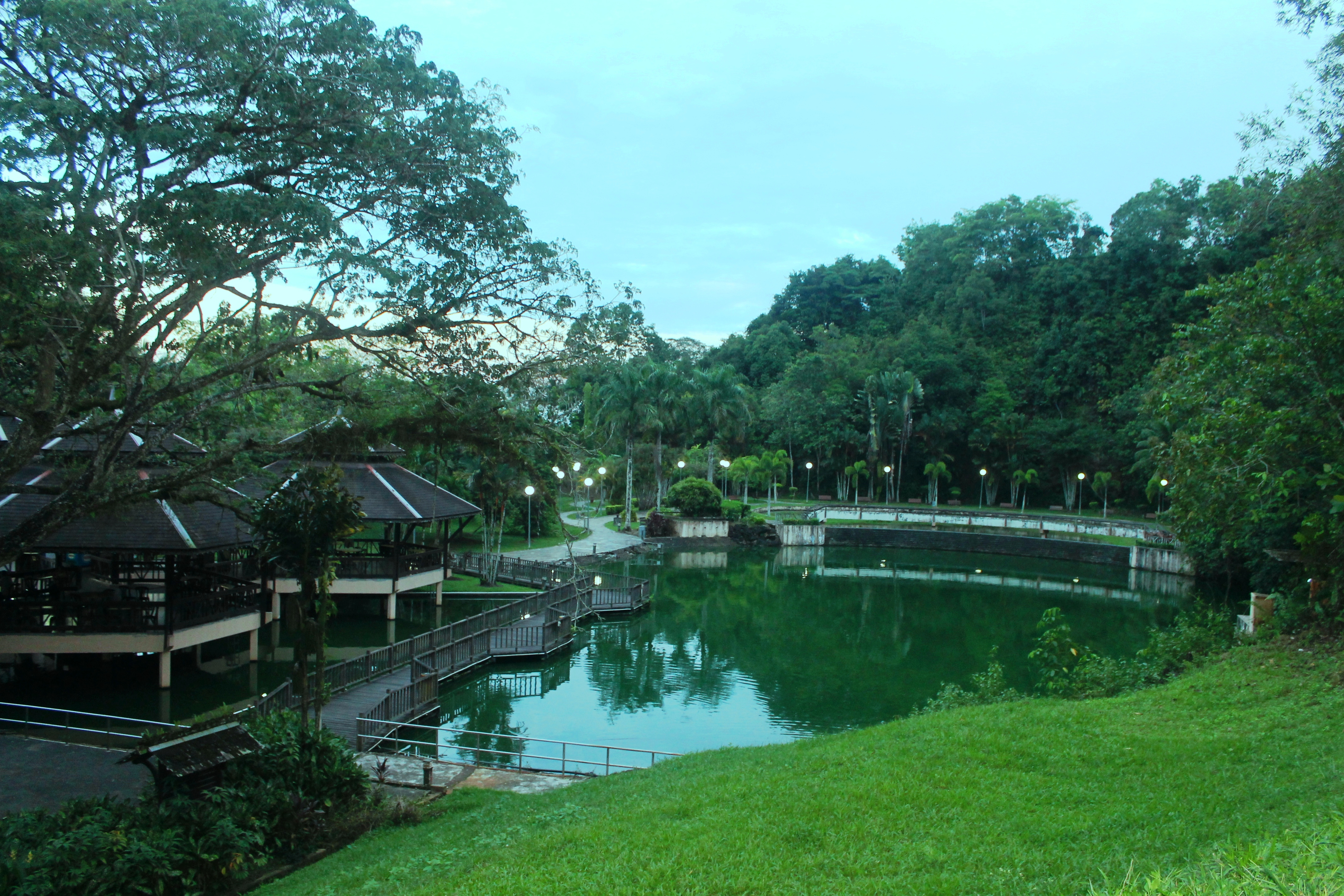
A view of cottages inside the Bukit Aup Jubilee Park.

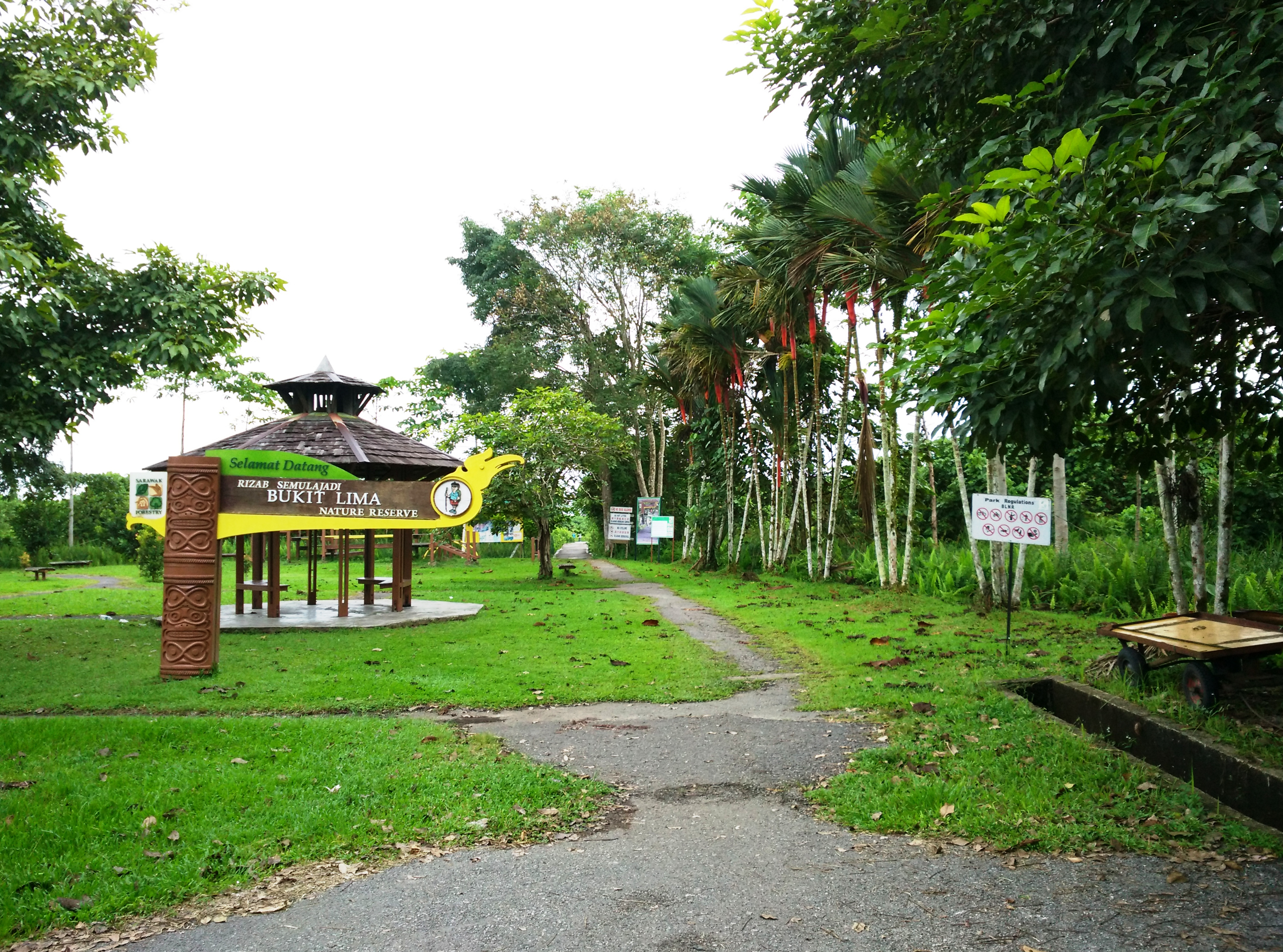
Entrance into Bukit Lima Forest Reserve.

Bukit Aup Jubilee Park was opened in March 1993. It is located 10 km away from the town of Sibu. It has a total undulating land of 24 acres (0.097 km^{2}). The park was the two consecutive winner of National Landscaping Competition Award in 1997 and 1998. The highest peak in the park, Bukit Aup (59 m above sea level) was originally a traditional burial ground for Iban warriors. The burial ground has since been relocated to a nearby village for the development of the park. However, the Iban community still regarded the peak as a sacred place and frequently brought offerings for the benevolent spirit named Nanga Bari.

Bukit Lima peat swamp forest reserve, covering 390 hectares (3.9 km^{2}), was gazetted as protected area since October 1929. In January 2001, Bukit Lima Forest Park covering 219 hectares (2.19 km^{2}) was constructed in the peat swamp forest and opened to the public. It has two separate trails of wooden planks of 3.5 km and 2.5 km long respectively. The park also has a 3-storey concrete watchtower for sightseeing. The park is managed by Sarawak Forestry Corporation (SFC).

Sibu has other urban and suburban parks such as Kutien Memorial Garden, Hin Hua Memorial Park, and Permai Lake Garden. The Kutien Memorial Garden located at Lanang Street is managed by Sibu Kutien Association. The Kutien Garden showcase the association's history and events. The Hin Hua Memorial Park is established by Sibu Heng Hua community where their earliest arrival in Sibu was in 1911. YMCA Camp Resort is located away from the town. It provides facilities for camping and retreat.

==== Sports ====
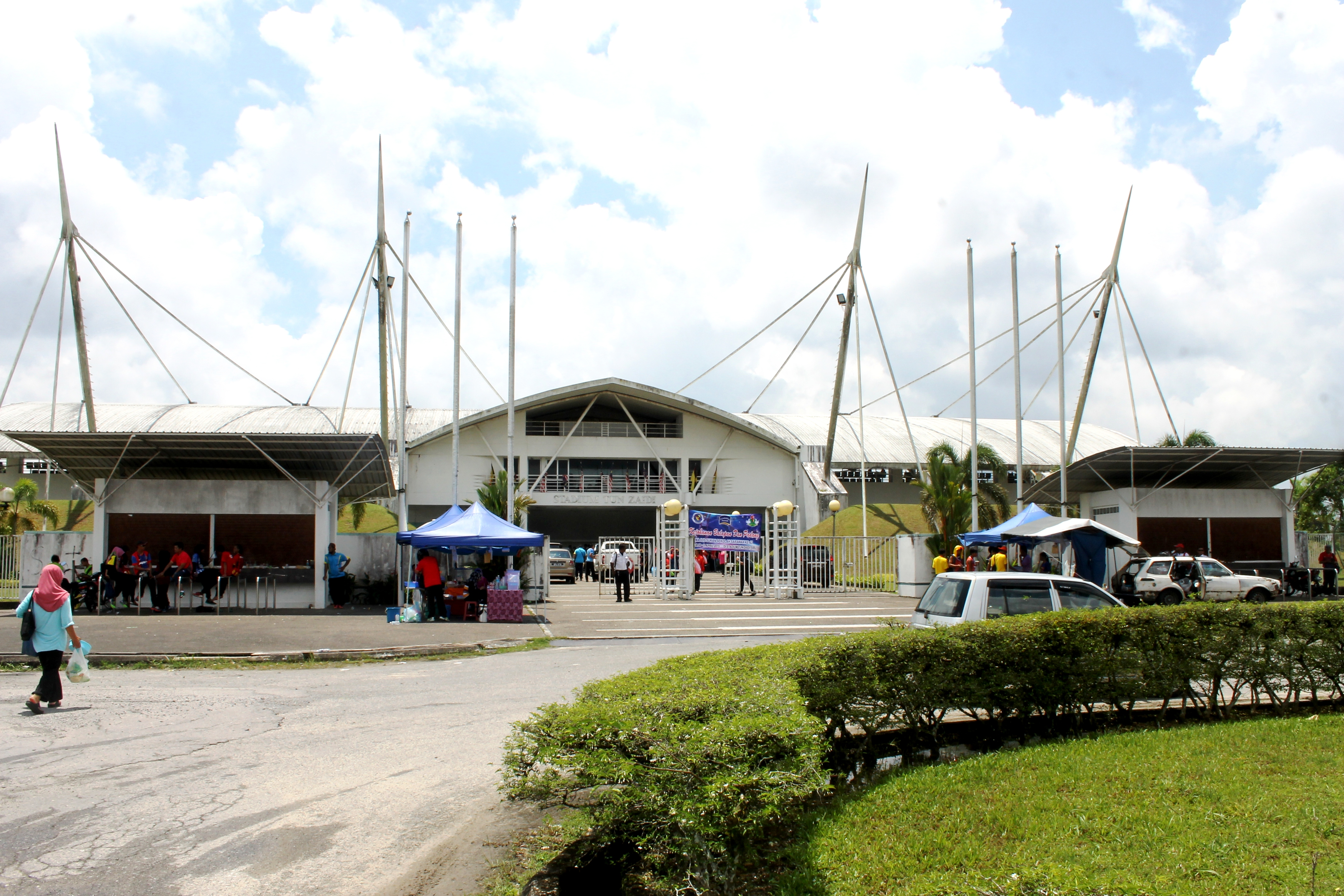
Stadium Tun Zaidi

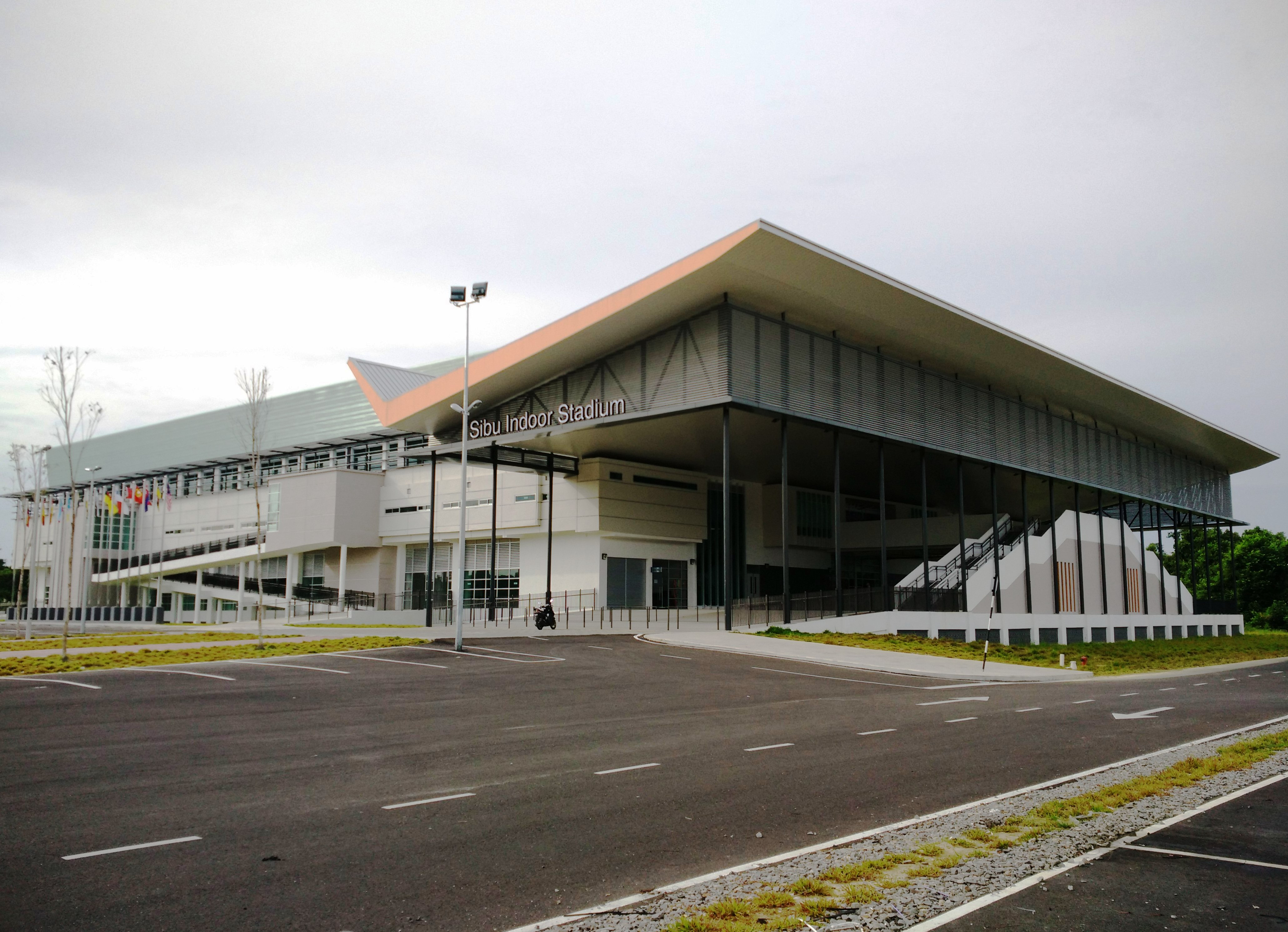
The Sibu Indoor Stadium

Sibu has three stadiums: Tun Zaidi Stadium, Sibu Indoor Stadium and Sibu Volleyball Indoor Stadium.

Sibu BASE jump is an annual event that is held in September every year since 2009, which lasts for 3 days. Night jumps are also performed if the weather is fair. The BASE jumping usually takes place from the top of Wisma Sanyan which is 126m high and is the tallest building in Sarawak. The number of jumpers has increased from 11 jumpers in 2009 to 45 jumpers in 2014. In 2013, world's first tandem BASE jumping from a building (Wisma Sanyan in Sibu) was done by Sean Chuma (world-renowned BASE jumper), carrying Rudy Anoi (chief executive of Sarawak Tourism Board, Sibu branch) with him.

Since 2001, Sarawak Health Marathon is held every year at Bukit Aup Jubilee Park, Sibu. The run can be divided into 6 categories, including 21 km Men's and Ladies' Open, 7 km Men's Fun Run and Boys' Junior, 2.5 km Girls' Junior, and 2.5 km Ladies Fun Run.

==== Other sights ====
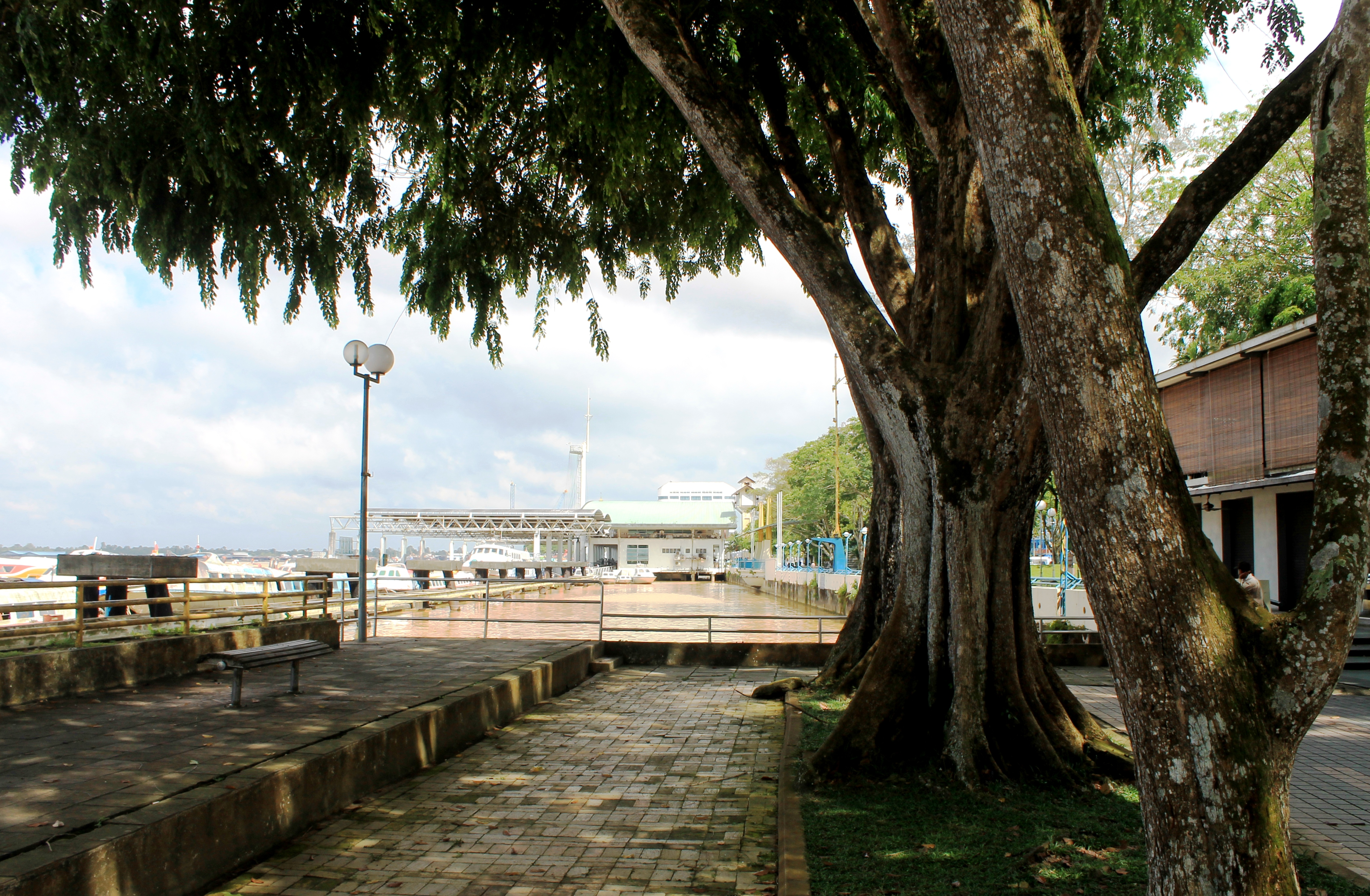
Rajang Esplanade Park.

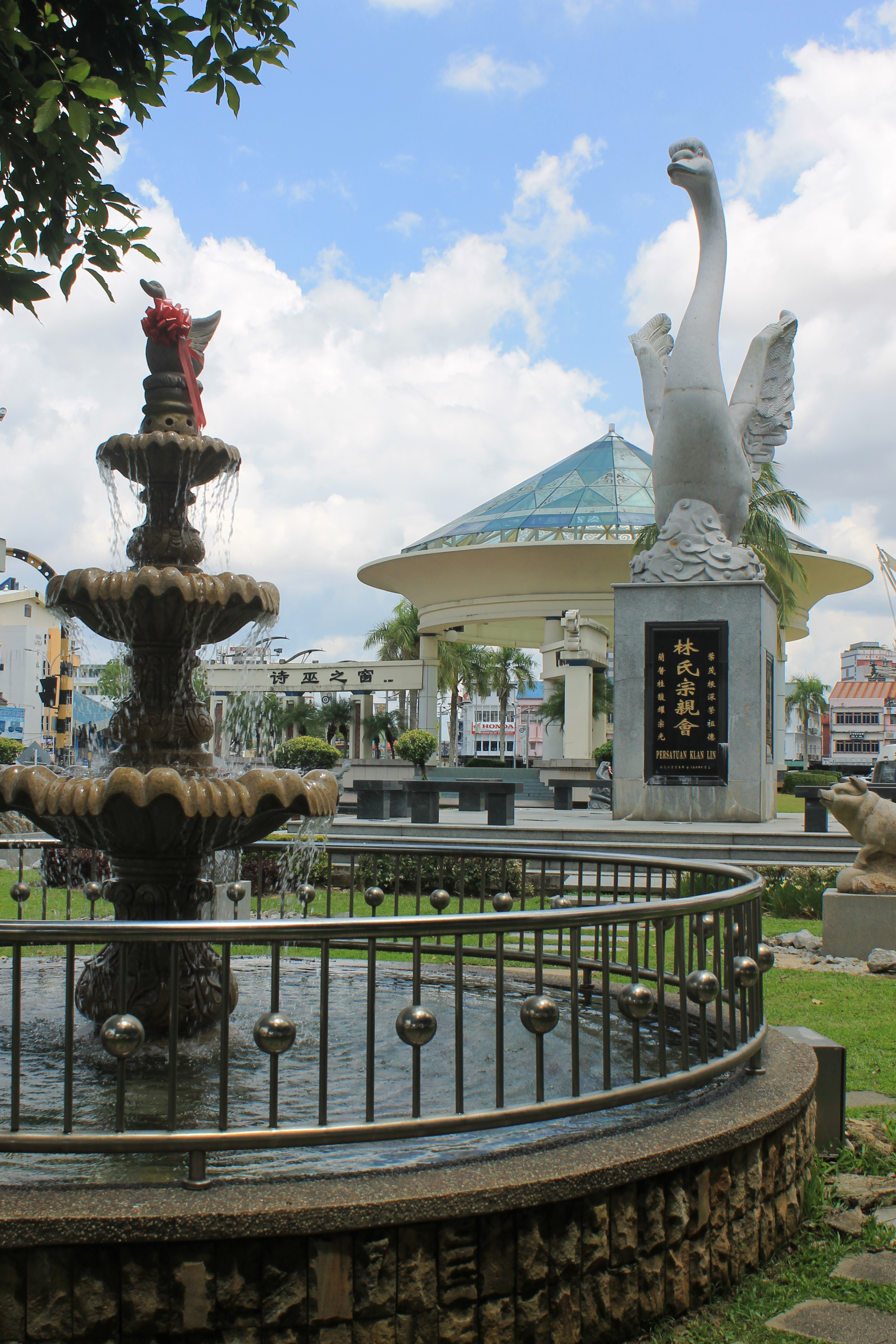
The Sibu Gateway.

Sibu Gateway is a landmark at the downtown area which includes an illuminated fountain, a garden, and a Swan statue surrounded by 12 Chinese zodiac signs. Rajang Esplanade is one of the 22 community parks in Sibu, mostly donated by Chinese clan associations. Rajang Esplanade has a walkway along the Rajang riverfront from Sibu wharf terminal to Kingwood Hotel with Hii's association playground along the way. It offers a scene of muddy river with timber barges, express boats, and fishing boats commuting on the river. Several mural paintings depicting historical lifestyles and local cuisines are found at various locations in Sibu.

==== Other events ====
Sibu Bike Week is an event that is held in December every year since 2011. It is a 3-day event aimed to bring all the enthusiasts of motorcyclists, cars, audio systems, BMX, Zumba, and paintball to share their hobbies and experiences. It has attracted about 2,000 bikers around the world. Among the activities held during Sibu Bike Week are Miss Sibu Bike Week Pageant, Tattoo queen and King competition. Borneo Talent Award (BTA) is held every year in Sibu since 2011 at Sibu Civic Centre. It showcases performances of singing, dancing, acrobatics, mimicry, playing musical instruments, magic show, and art performances.

==== Shopping ====
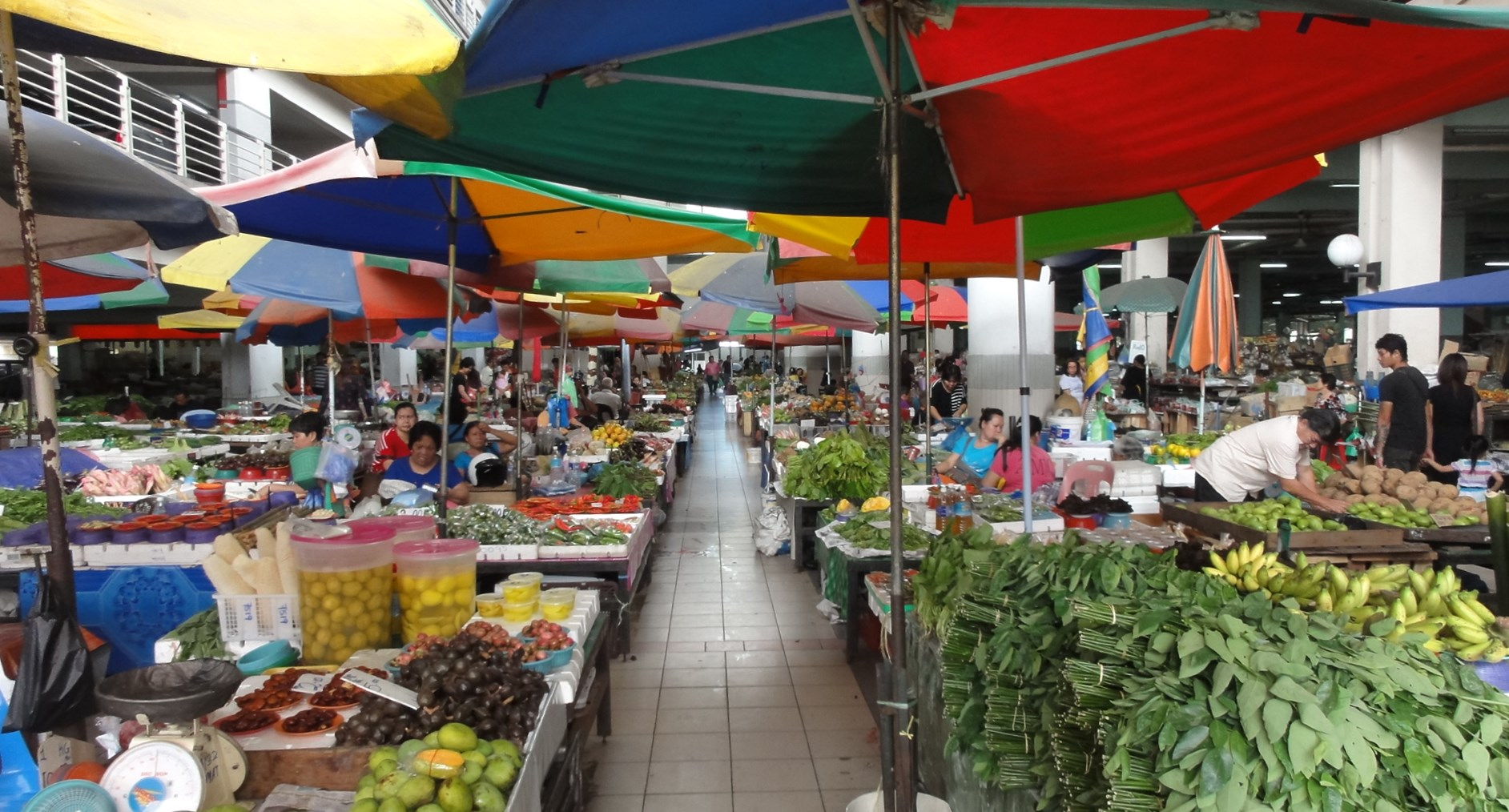
A scene at the Sibu central market.

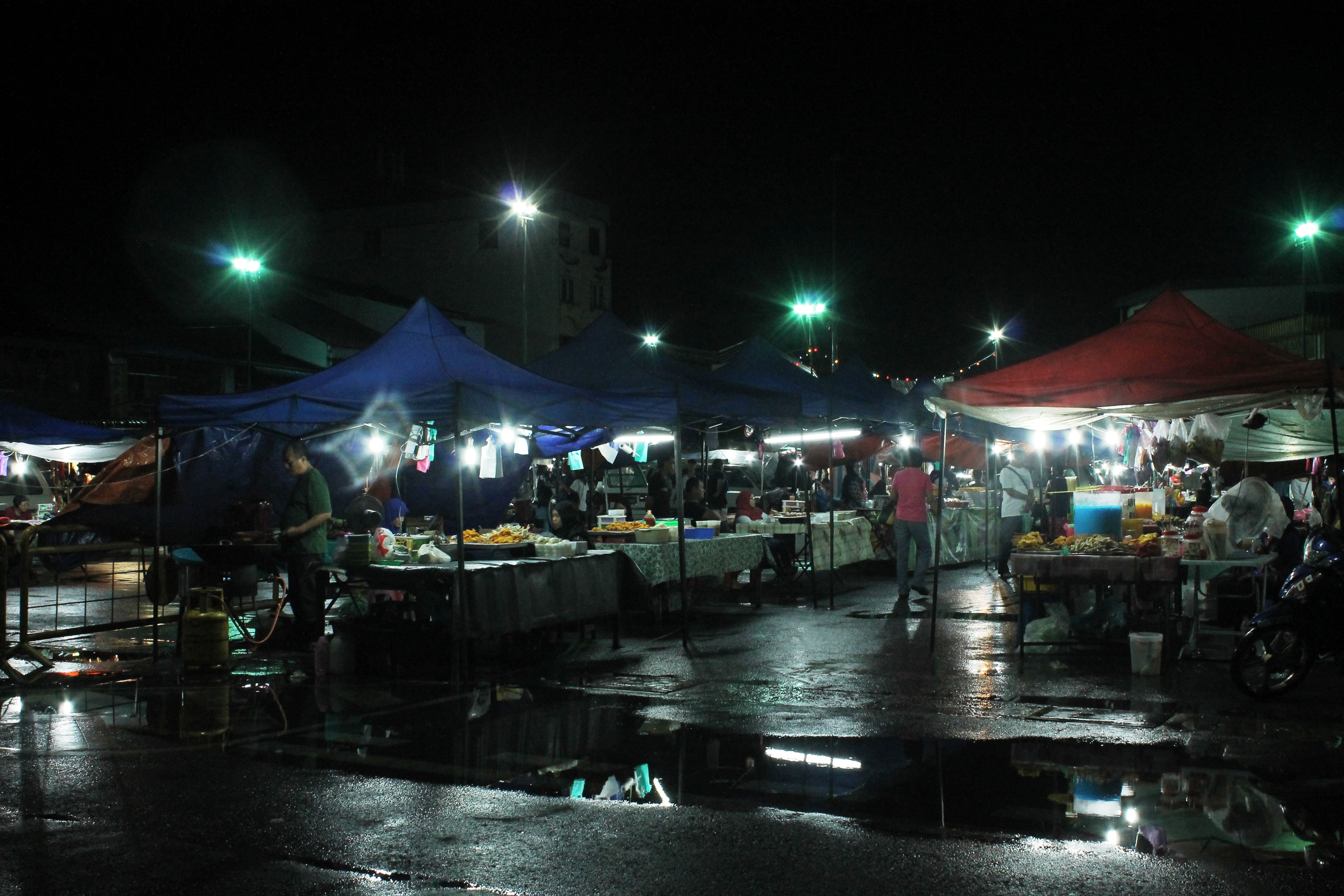
A scene at the Sibu night market.

Sibu features a number of shopping malls: Wisma Sanyan, Medan Mall, Sing Kwong Shopping Complex, Farley Departmental Store, Delta Mall, Star Mega Mall, Everwin, Swan Square, and The Hann's Residence.

The Sibu Night Market was established in 1973. It was situated in the town centre. Local traders will usually set up their mobile stalls from 5 pm to 10 pm every day. The stalls offer household goods, footwear, fashion items, and varieties of food. In August 2012, the market was relocated to Butterfly Garden at Cross Road near the Tua Pek Kong Temple to ease traffic jams.

The Sibu Central Market is the largest indoor market in Malaysia. It is located at Channel Street, opposite the Sibu wharf terminal. The central market has food stalls on top floor with dry and wet market on the ground floor. Among the items on sale in this market are exotic fruits, jungle produce, handicrafts, Bario rice, and poultry. There are 1,100 stalls in the market on weekdays and 400-500 additional stalls on weekends when the indigenous people from the interior brought their jungle produce to the market.

== Cuisine ==
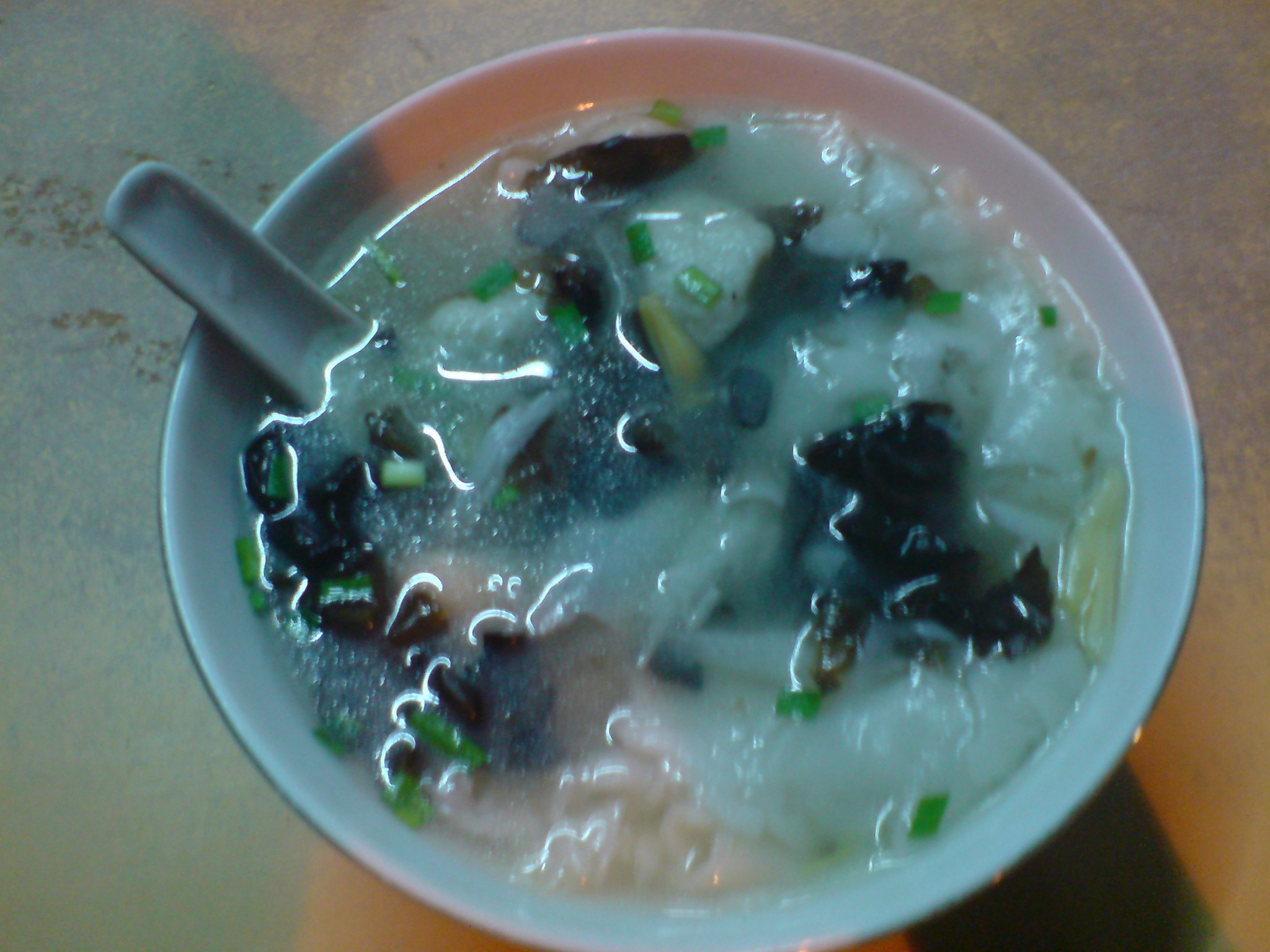
Dian Mian Hu (鼎边糊).

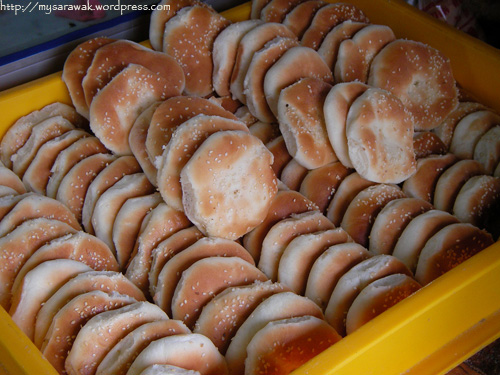
Kompia (光饼).

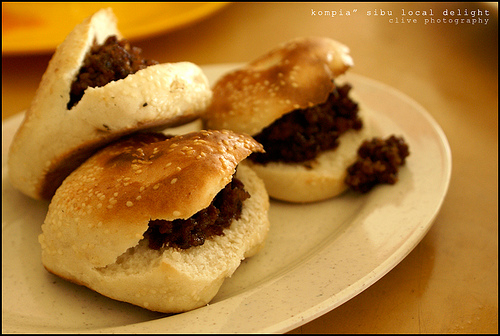
Kompia with minced pork.

Sibu is well-known for its wide variety of ethnic dishes, especially indigenous food from the Dayaks community and also food inspired from Fuzhou community. The "Bandong walk" project was started in 2012 and was scheduled to be completed in 2015. This project is set to make the Bandong area a halal food hub of local delicacies for the locals and the tourists. Common dishes that can be found all over Sibu include: (Note: The names are rendered in the Fuzhou dialect, which is often radically different from Standard Chinese)

- Kampua noodle (also known as 干盘面 'dry plate noodles') — a dish introduced by early Chinese migrants from Foochow city (Fuzhou) who settled in Sibu, is a simple and filling noodle dish. It consists of homemade noodles mixed with locally available ingredients like pork lard, shallots, and seasonings. The noodles, made from wheat flour, eggs, salt, and water, are boiled, strained, and then tossed with fragrant pork lard, sauces, and seasonings. Slices of pork are added for flavour, and today, Kampua comes in various versions, including plain, dark, and red, with different sauces for distinct flavour profiles. It is available at almost all coffee shops and food stalls. Halal kampua noodles are available too.
- Dian Mian Hu (also known as Duëng Mian Ngu or Ding Bian Hu 鼎边糊) — a unique noodle soup from Sibu, has roots in the migration of Fuzhou settlers. Its name translates to "wok edge paste" in Chinese, alluding to its distinctive preparation method. The star of the dish is the flat noodles made from a rice flour batter. This batter is poured along the edge of a hot wok, forming thin dough upon contact. Skilled hands scrape this into the soup, creating the distinct noodles. The soup is a masterpiece, usually featuring a blend of pork and cuttlefish stock, enhanced with local ingredients like Sarawakian white pepper. Diners can add extra flavour with a dash of this aromatic pepper. Some variations even offer a curry-based soup, showcasing local influence. Dian Mian Hu is a sought-after delicacy, primarily enjoyed in eateries due to its specialised preparation techniques. It is available at several stalls as a hefty breakfast or a late night supper.
- Kompia (also known as Guang Bing, Kompyang or Gom bian 光饼) — often referred to as "Foochow bagels", is a delightful bread akin to bagels with its origins in Fuzhou, China. It made its way to Malaysian towns with a thriving Fuzhou Chinese community, becoming a culinary gem. Legend has it that Kompia was invented by Qi Jiguang, who designed it with a hole in the centre for easy portability during military campaigns. The dough is prepared from wheat flour, baking soda, yeast, salt, and water, then shaped into balls with a hole in the centre. Traditionally baked in clay ovens, modern versions use conventional ovens. Kompia can be enjoyed plain or with sesame seeds, and regional variations abound. In Sibu, it is often served with stewed pork mince, but creative adaptations include Kompia with donut icing, rojak sauce, and even as a cheeseburger, showcasing its versatility. Traditional soft kompia dipped in pork mince sauce can be sought from Chung Hua road, the Sunday Market at Pedada road, and Sibu Central Market. There are deep fried variations available throughout the town of Sibu.
- Bian Nyuk (also known as 扁肉) — meaning 'flattened meat' in the Foochow dialect, is a traditional dish in Sibu, celebrated for its rich Foochow culinary heritage. The wonton-type dish features a thin and translucent skin called yanpi, which is made without the use of alkaline water. Unlike traditional wontons, Bian Nyuk boasts thinner skin and a lighter, less greasy texture. It is typically filled with lean and finely minced pork. Often eaten alongside another Sibu breakfast staple, Kampua noodles, Bian Nyuk comes in both soup and dry-tossed variations. Served in various flavours, including white and savoury black with dark soy sauce.
- Bazhen Soup (also known as 八珍汤/八珍药 or Bek Ding Yuok or Eight Rarity Soup) — one of the well-known herbal soups in Sibu. Many people love to drink it since young. It is made up of two recipes of soup, Sijunzi Soup (Four Gentlemen Soup) and Siwu Soup (Four Substance Soup). The Codonopsis, Atractylodes, Poria and Licorice in the recipe are the ingredients from Sijunzi Soup. While the Shudi, Baishao, Angelica and Chuanxiong are the ingredients from Siwu Soup. These eight types of Chinese herbs add up to become Bazhen Tang, which traditionally help to nourish qi and blood, strengthen the spleen and stomach, and relieve fatigue. Bazhen Soup should be evenly proportioned with sufficient ingredients to make the taste authentic. When paired with Fuzhou longevity noodles, it turns into a delicious dish. Bazhen soup packed could be purchased easily from traditional Chinese herbal shops in Sibu town like Poh Guan Hong and Chew Hock Choon.
- Sarawak Laksa — a renowned soup noodle dish originating from Sarawak, is celebrated for its distinctive shrimp-based broth and complex laksa spice paste. This paste, comprising various aromatic ingredients, is sautéed to perfection before being combined with chicken and prawn broth and coconut milk. The broth is seasoned with soy sauce, vinegar, or fish sauce for a balanced flavour. Typically served with thin rice vermicelli noodles and a variety of garnishes including spring onions, prawns, chicken, and egg omelette, Sarawak Laksa is enhanced with a side of shrimp paste and chilli sambal belacan. A halved kalamansi lime is also provided to brighten the dish with a citrusy touch. Renowned chef Anthony Bourdain hailed it as the "breakfast of the gods", making it a must-try for food enthusiasts worldwide.
- Tebaloi (also known as Tabaloi) — is a traditional Melanau snack closely linked to the Sarawak region, particularly the Mukah and Dalat districts. It is made from sago flour, desiccated coconut, eggs, and sugar, which are mixed to create a dough. This dough is then flattened on a banana leaf and cooked over a wood fire stove, giving it a unique smoky flavour. Once cooked, the dough is cut into squares, flattened further, and dried to achieve its signature crispiness. Tebaloi comes in various flavours today but maintains its historic ties to the Melanau people's culture and traditions. You can find it in Sibu Central Market and enjoy its delightful textures and tastes during tea time.
- Kek Lapis Sarawak — is a popular layered cake in Sarawak, known for its vibrant colours and intricate designs. Originating from Indonesia, it was introduced in the 1970s and 1980s and later adapted by Sarawakians with unique flavours and colours. This cake is made using Western cake-making techniques, with a batter of flour, eggs, milk, butter, and various flavourings and colours baked in thin layers. These layers are carefully assembled and bound with condensed milk or jam. The cake's cross-section reveals its kaleidoscopic beauty, showcasing the skill and attention to detail in its creation. Kek Lapis Sarawak is a protected geographical indication of Sarawak since 2010, ensuring its authenticity and quality. Kek Lapis Sarawak can be found easily at Sibu Central Market.
- Manok Pansoh (also known as Manuk Pansuhi) — a cherished dish among the Dayak community in Sarawak, involves cooking marinated chicken inside a bamboo stalk, infusing it with a unique flavor. The chicken is prepared with a mix of aromatic ingredients, including ginger, lemongrass, and more. This marinated chicken is then stuffed into bamboo, sealed with tapioca leaves, and roasted over an open fire, creating a delightful and aromatic dish. Manok Pansoh's exact origin remains a mystery, but its ingenuity and simplicity make it a beloved tradition, initially served during the Gawai Dayak festival but now enjoyed widely at various occasions.
- Terung Asam (also known as Terung Dayak) — is a unique and sour-tasting fruit cherished by Sarawak's Dayak community. Unlike regular aubergines, it has a round shape, dark green skin turning yellow when ripe, and firm, bright yellow flesh with small seeds in the centre. Terung Asam is not only distinct in appearance but also offers impressive nutrition, including vitamin C, calcium, fibre, phosphorus, and potassium. It is commonly used in Sarawak-style sour and spicy soups, where it is combined with lemongrass, chili, ginger, and various proteins like fish, poultry, or meat. Grilling Terung Asam and making it into a spicy sambal is another popular approach. Some even use it to create unique Terung Asam-flavoured ice cream.
- Empurau — known as the "King of the River", is Malaysia's priciest fish, inhabiting clear, swift rivers with a unique taste influenced by its diet of native fruits. Its slow growth contributes to its high cost, with larger specimens fetching prices up to RM 2000 per kg. Typically steamed or eaten raw, it offers a delicate flavor and edible scales that chefs transform into crispy snacks. However, wild Empurau populations are dwindling due to overfishing and habitat loss, prompting conservation efforts.
- Rojak Kassim — Indian-style rojak (also known as pasembur or Mamak Rojak).
- You Zhar Gui (also known as 油炸桧, 油條, Yau Char Kway, or Kueh Cakoi in Malay) — deep fried twin dough batter often dipped in soup or chili sauce. It is often eaten together with porridge or Bak Kut Teh (肉骨茶).

== Notable people ==
=== Politics ===
- Abang Muhammad Salahuddin Abang Barieng – former third and sixth Yang di-Pertua Negeri of Sarawak
- Ahmad Zaidi Adruce – former fifth Yang di-Pertua Negeri of Sarawak
- Alice Lau Kiong Yeng – current Deputy Speaker of the Dewan Rakyat; current MP for Lanang
- Annuar Rapaee – current Sarawak's deputy minister of education, innovation and talent development; current MLA for Nangka
- Awang Bemee Awang Ali Basah – current President of the Dewan Negara
- Fadillah Yusof – current Deputy Prime Minister of Malaysia
- Oscar Ling Chai Yew – current MP for Sibu
- Robert Lau Hoi Chew – former MP for Sibu; former Malaysia's deputy minister of transport
- Rosli Dhobi – Sarawak's anti-colonial activist
- Tiong King Sing – current Malaysia's minister of tourism, arts and culture
- Tiong Thai King – former MP for Lanang; former chairman of Sibu municipal council
- Tuanku Bujang Tuanku Othman – former second Yang di-Pertua Negeri of Sarawak
- Wong Ho Leng – former MP for Sibu; former MLA for Bukit Assek; former chairman of Sarawak DAP

=== Business ===
- Tan Sri Datuk Sir Tiong Hiew King, Chairman of Rimbunan Hijau Group and elder brother of Datuk Tiong Thai King. He was listed as one of the 10 richest Malaysians and also one of the Malaysians receiving the knighthood from the British Government.
- Datuk Lau Hui Siong, Founder of See Hua Group which publishes See Hua Daily News, The Borneo Post, and Utusan Borneo.
- Hii King Chiong, businessman and philanthropist.
- Mary Lim, businesswoman and educator.

=== Others ===
- Abang Iskandar Abang Hashim, former President of the Court of Appeal of Malaysia
- Andrew Cheng, US-based musician. He has also been working on concerts with Hong Kong singers/actors William So, Fred Cheng and Stephanie Ho as well as jazz musician Matt Garrison and Shereen Cheong of the Victory Boyd band.
- Edwin Ong Wee Kee, photographer who became the first Malaysian to win the grand prize of the 8th Hamdan International Photography Award (Hipa) in Dubai, United Arab Emirates (UAE).
- Gloria Ting Mei Ru, Miss Malaysia World 2004.
- Datuk Dr. Matnor Daim, former director of Education, Malaysia and recipient of National Education Leadership 2011 Award in conjunction of National Level Teachers Day 2011 in Kuching.
- Ting Ming Siong, a food stall operator, known as the Guinness World Record Holder for the "Most weddings attended by a best man". He attended 1,393 weddings from September 1975 to 2 February 2006)
- Ting Ung Kee, a famous traditional Chinese medicine practitioner in Sibu who created the well-known herbal tincture in 1950 known as Ubat Sakit Perut Cap Rusa Sing Kong Chui (鹿标申功水). There is a wall mural in Sibu town, dedicated to his contribution to Sibu.
- PLC. Gs. Ts. Dr. Mohammad Mujaheed Hassan, Senior Lecturer,Department of Social & Development Sciences, Faculty of Human Ecology & Deputy Director (International Relations), Putra International Centre (i-PUTRA), University of Putra Malaysia

== See also ==
- Diocese of Sibu, a diocese of the Latin Church of the Catholic Church in Malaysia
- Sibu by-election, 2010
