= Diocese of Sibu =

Latin Catholic diocese in Malaysia

Diocese of Sibu Diœcesis Sibuensis Keuskupan Sibu 诗巫教区

Catholic
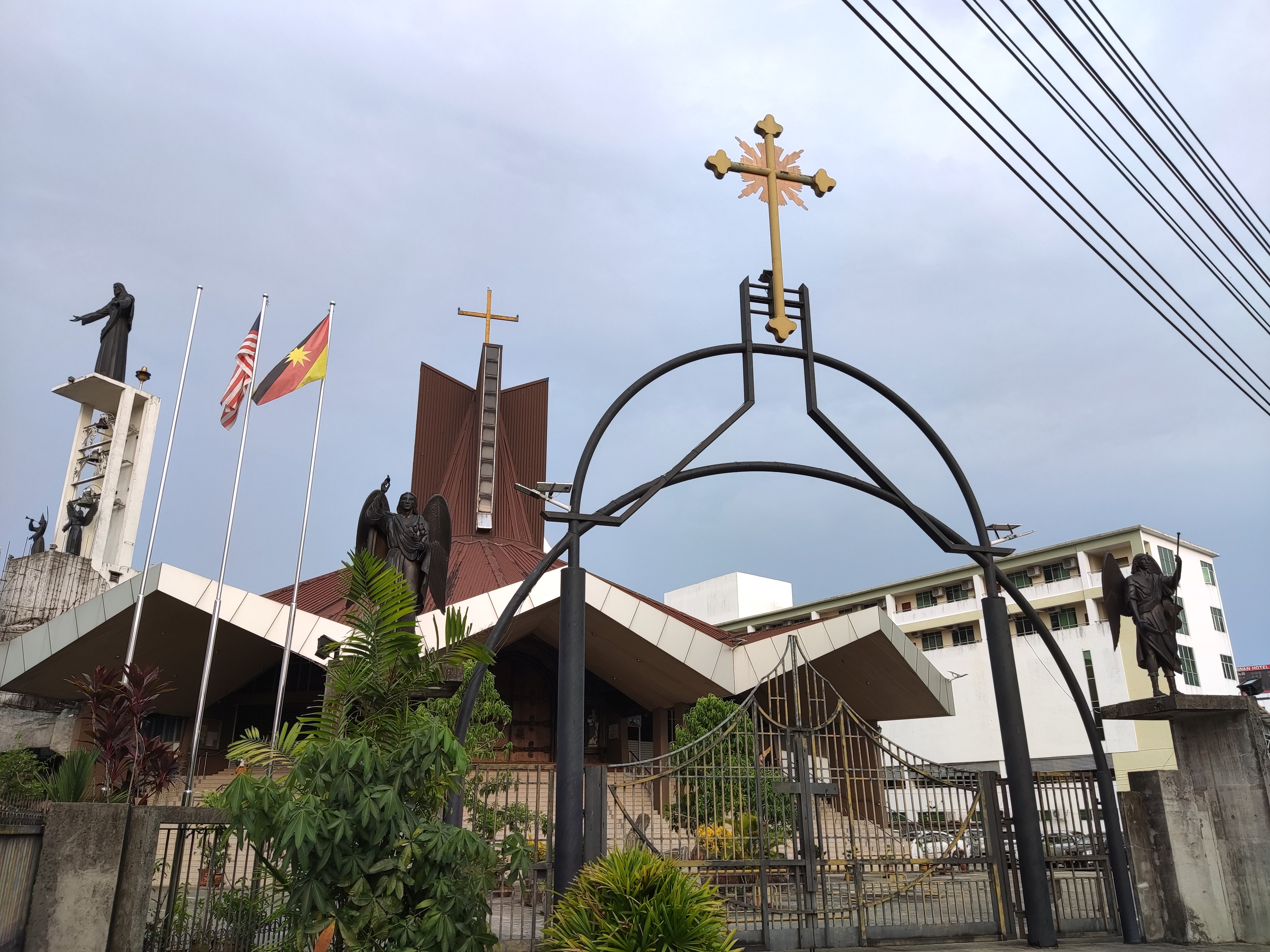
- Sacred Heart Cathedral

- Coat of arms

Location
- Country: Malaysia
- Territory: Sibu; Mukah; Dalat; Sarikei; Bintangor; Julau; Kanowit; Song; Kapit; Selangau
- Episcopal conference: Catholic Bishops' Conference of Malaysia, Singapore and Brunei
- Ecclesiastical province: Kuching
- Metropolitan: Kuching

Statistics
- Area: 41,484 km^{2} (16,017 sq mi)
- Population: Total; Catholics: (as of 2023); 895,000; 130,700 (14.6%)
- Parishes: 12

Information
- Denomination: Catholic
- Sui iuris church: Latin Church
- Rite: Roman Rite
- Established: 22 December 1986
- Cathedral: Sacred Heart Cathedral
- Patron saint: Sacred Heart of Jesus; Saint Joseph
- Language: Ecclesiastical Latin; English language; Cantonese language; Hakka language; Foochow language; Iban language; Melanau language; Malay language; Mandarin language

Current leadership
- Pope: Leo XIV
- Bishop: Joseph Hii Teck Kwong
- Metropolitan Archbishop: Simon Peter Poh Hoon Seng
- Vicar General: Michael Lee Hock Chai
- Episcopal Vicars: Alphonsus Tang Chung Tung, Chancellor; Paul Chee Haw Pau, Vicar general emeritus

Map
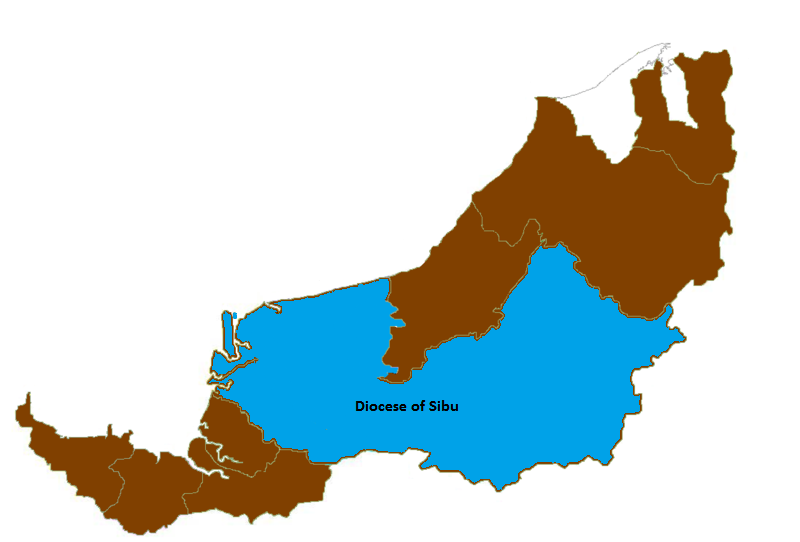
- The diocese map

Website
- catholic.my/dioceseofsibu

The Diocese of Sibu (Latin: Dioecesis Sibuensis; Malay: Keuskupan Sibu; Mandarin: 诗巫教区) is a Latin Catholic ecclesiastical territory of the Catholic Church in the state of Sarawak, Malaysia, covering areas from Sarikei to Mukah.

Erected in 1986 by Pope John Paul II and first led by (the late) Dominic Su Haw Chiu, this diocese is a suffragan diocese in the ecclesiastical province of the metropolitan Archdiocese of Kuching. The diocesan cathedral is the Sacred Heart Cathedral in Sibu. The Sacred Heart of Jesus and Saint Joseph are the principal patrons of the diocese.

Since 12 February 2012, Joseph Hii Teck Kwong has been the bishop of Sibu.

== History ==
The Sibu Catholic Mission started in 1899 when Fr. Cornelius Keet MHM, a Mill Hill priest from the Netherlands, first arrived. A small hut was built for the priest to stay on his travels to Bintangor and Sare (Sarikei). Although it was only a short stay, he managed to convert a few hundred people to the Catholic faith before he was recalled to Kuching.

Fr. Vincent Halder MHM arrived Sibu in 1906. He built the old Sacred Heart Church on stilts which served the Catholic community until 1954. Fr. Halder is described as a most lovable character. He was extremely well liked by his boys and by all the people in Sibu. A new convent school was opened in 1929 and 13 churches were built in the lower Rejang area as the Mission was called. Fr. Halder left for Europe on 1 March 1931 and on his return, he fell ill and died in Singapore on 16 August 1936 at the age of 57. The Catholics from Sibu had his body brought back and he was buried in the mission compound. When his body was exhumed 28 years later to make way for development, it was found to be incorrupt, so he was given a second funeral around Sibu town.

Fr. Keet returned to Sibu and was assisted by Fr. Aloysius Hopfgartner MHM. This was the first push in the Rejang District towards work among the Chinese. Education was of primary concern. Fr. Hopfgartner founded the Sacred Heart School and became its principal until he was transferred to Sandakan, Sabah in 1908.

Fr. William van Odijk MHM took over from Fr. Halder and the mission continued to flourish, looking also after the Lower Rejang area. Since 1910 Sibu is mentioned as a separate mission. Fr. Odijk died in 1936 at the age of 55.

Fr John Vos MHM arrived and was mainly involved in school work. His stay in Sibu was short before moving to Kuching. He was succeeded by Fr James Buis MHM in 1938. As the Sacred Heart School grew, priests like Fr. Thomas Delaney MHM (1933–1937), Fr. William Wagenaar MHM (1935–1938), Fr. Gerard Bruggeman MHM (1937–1940), Fr. Francis Hulsbosch MHM (1938–1939), and Fr. John Dekker MHM (1940–1942) were assigned to take up teaching posts. Besides school work they were also engaged in pastoral work.

In May 1942, the European priests were interned by the Japanese at Batu Lintang camp, Kuching. Fr. Joseph Chin was the only remaining local priest in the whole of the Rejang region, and had to go underground to carry out his priestly duties. He went house to house offering Mass secretly. He was caught twice and was flogged and jailed. He was highly esteemed by all who know him. He was the builder of St Mary's church and was its first priest from 1967 to 1968. He died of cancer in 1969.

The Japanese surrendered in 1945. The interned priests were flown from Kuching to Labuan in September to recuperate for a short time. It was decided that some priests would go to Europe for long leave, others would start to re-open the mission stations. Fr. Buis returned to Sibu, so the mission revived and continued to flourish. Fr. Dekker revived the Sacred Heart School at the end of 1945. In a couple of years the schools and mission were back to a healthy growth. Fr. John Maher MHM came in 1946 and taught for 5 years in Sacred Heart School.

Fr. James Buis was appointed Prefect for North Borneo (now Sabah) on 18 January 1947. Frs. John Dekker and William Wagenaar were appointed acting rectors during 1947 to 1950. During those years, Frs. Clement Epping MHM and Charles Reiterer MHM arrived at Sibu to perform pastoral and educational work.

Fr. Adrian de Vos MHM became the new rector of Sibu Mission in January 1950. He also became the principal of Sacred Heart School which by this time had 600 students. In 1954 the Mill Hill Fathers realised they could not cope with their missionary work and the school as well, so they invited De La Salle Brothers to take over the running of Sacred Heart School. Brother Fridolin became the principal. The school continues to run under them until the appointment of the first local principal, Samuel Tan, in 1987.

Frs. Thomas Taam and Anthony Lam, Chinese missionaries who escaping communist warfare in mainland China, arrived at Sibu to begin their pastoral mission in the 1940s and 1950s, and subsequently obtained Malaysian citizenship upon Malaysia's creation in 1963. The Su brothers, Dominic (later bishop; 1939-2026), Francis (born 1942), and Philip (1945-2003) were ordained simultaneously in the 1960s. They were later followed by Frs. Peter Ng, Michael Lee, and James Ting the following year.

On 22 December 1986, Pope John Paul II, by the order of papal bull "Adoranda Christi Verba" erected the Diocese of Sibu, as a suffragan see of the Metropolitan Archdiocese of Kuching. Fr. Dominic Su was ordained by Pope John Paul II as bishop of Sibu on 6 January 1987 at St. Peter's Basilica, Vatican City.

Fr. David Bingham MHM, a Briton, served for 14 years mostly in the Selangau area, during which time the mission was developed, not only in buildings but also the Stations of the Cross on the hill slope. Fr. William Bos MHM, a Dutchman, served Sibu Mission in looking after the Than Catholics in town, along the Oya and Igan. He served the diocese as Vicar General from 1987. He and Fathers Bingham, Thomas O'Connor MHM of Ireland and Ferdinand Vergeer MHM of the Netherlands became first foreign priests served under newly created diocese and they all are Mill Hill priests.

Basic Ecclesial Communities (BEC) was established in Sibu on 27 July 1987 and were divided into 5 zones. On 28 May 1991, deacon Joseph Sebastian of Dalat became the first Melanau to be ordained priest at the old Sts. Peter and Paul Church in Mukah, and second from the town, following (the late) Fr. Lawrence Chua. In 1993, three priests from Sibu, Frs. Joseph Hii (now bishop), Andrew Tan, and Alphonsus Tang (formerly a Methodist), were ordained simultaneously by bishop Su. They were later followed by Frs. Paul Chee in 1996, and Paul Ling in 1997.

In 2008, Pope Benedict XVI accepted Su's resignation due to age and health problems, and appointed Fr. Joseph Hii as Auxiliary Bishop of Sibu. By the time, the last priests ordained by Su were Frs. Simon Lau, Fabian Kong, Philip Hu and David Ho. Fr. Hii was ordained in May 2008 and installed as bishop of Sibu in February 2012. At the same year, Fr. Mark Aloysius SJ, a Jesuit, became the first priest to be ordained by the new bishop at St. Mary's Church. The first African to serve the diocese was Fr. Matthews Olili MHM, a Kenyan, in 2011.

== Bishops ==
The seat of the bishop is at Sacred Heart Cathedral. These are the lists of the bishops and auxiliary bishop of the diocese and their years of service:

No.	Portrait	Name	Period in office	Insignia
1		Dominic Su Haw Chiu (1939–2026)	11 February 1987 – 24 December 2011	
2		Joseph Hii Teck Kwong (born 1965)	15 February 2012 – present	

=== Auxiliary Bishop ===
- Joseph Hii Teck Kwong (2008–2012), appointed Bishop of Sibu on 24 December 2011 and installed 15 February 2012

== Parishes ==
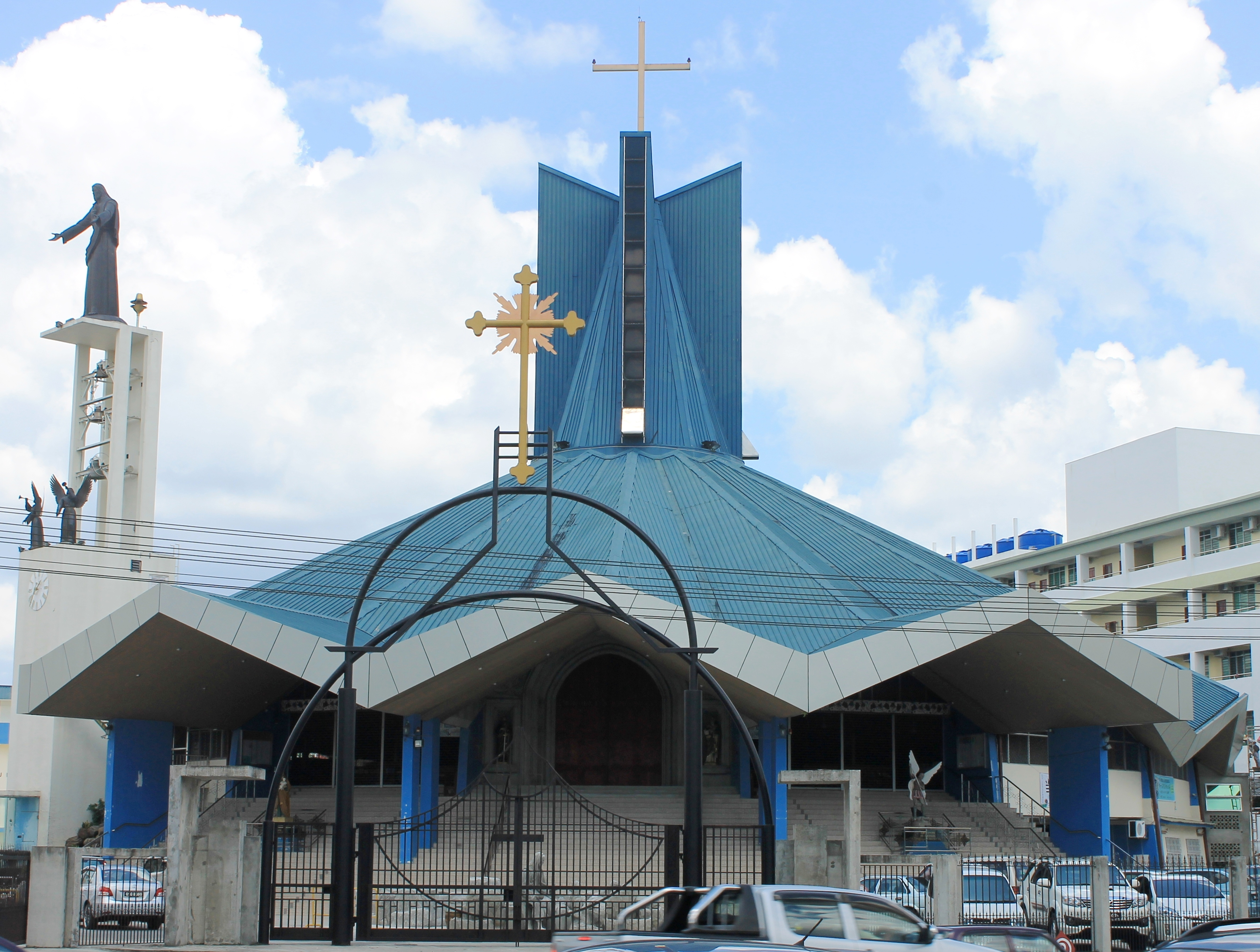
The cathedral old view before 2015

- Sacred Heart of Jesus Cathedral, Sibu
  - Rector(s): Rev. Joseph Sebastian
  - Assistant(s): Rev. Francis Go, OFM Cap (outstationed from the Diocese of Melaka-Johor), Rev. Raphael Samosir, OFM Cap (Capuchin Franciscan from Indonesia), Rev. Edward Raymond Misius (outstationed from Archdiocese of Kota Kinabalu), The Very Rev. Msgr. Paul Chee Haw Pau (Vicar general emeritus), Rev. Paul Ling Keh Yiing, Rev. Benedetto Benno, OFM Cap (Capuchin Franciscan from Indonesia) and Rev. Diego V., OFM Cap (Capuchin Franciscan from Indonesia)
    - sub-parishes of Kemuyang Diocesan Pastoral Centre, Sibu
    - St. Dominic's Church, Teku, Sibu
    - St. Michael's Church, Sibu Jaya, Sibu
    - St. James' Church, Mile 11, Sibu-Bintulu Road, Sibu
    - St. Anthony's Church, Oya Camp, Sibu
    - St. Joseph's Church, Durin, Sibu
    - St. Anne's Church, Paradom/Tg. Kunyit, Sibu
    - Mary Immaculate Church, Sg. Sadit/Nam Ping Chiong Estate, Sibu
    - St. Peter's Church, Bukit Lan, Bawang Assan, Sibu
    - St. Joseph's Mission Animation Centre, Sentosa, Sibu
    - Sukun Catholic Centre, Lanang, Sibu
    - St. Mary's Church, Passin, Sibu
    - Sawai Catholic Church, Sawai, Passin, Sibu and
    - St. Peter's Church, Pasai, Sibu
- St. Mary's of the Divine Mercy Parish, Jln. Awang Ramli Amit, Sibu
  - Rector(s): The Very Rev. Msgr. Michael Lee Hock Chai (Vicar general)
  - Assistant(s): Rev. Richard Lau See Nguong
- St. Teresa's Parish, Sg. Merah, Sibu
  - Rector(s): Rev. David Ho
  - Assistant(s): Rev. David Lau
    - sub-parish of St. Teresa's Oratory, Sg. Merah, Sibu
- Sts. Peter and Paul's Parish, Mukah
  - Rector: Rev. Alphonsus Tang Chung Tung (Chancellor)
  - Assistant(s): --
    - sub-parishes of St. Anthony's Church, Telian, Mukah
    - St. Mary's Church, Balingian, Mukah
    - Our Lady of Fatima Church, Teh Labak, Mukah
    - St. Francis Xavier's Church, Sau, Mukah
    - Sacred Heart Church, Jebungan/Tegak, Mukah
    - St. Joseph's Church, Sesok, Mukah
    - St. Jude's Church, Petanak, Mukah and
    - St. Thomas' Church, Teh/Tabo, Mukah
- St. Bernard of Clairvaux's Parish, Dalat
  - Rector(s): Rev. Johanaz Ling
  - Assistant(s): --
    - sub-parishes of St. Peter's Church, Medong, Dalat
    - Our Lady of Fatima Church, Ud, Dalat
    - St. Francis Xavier's Church, Bungan Kecil, Dalat
    - St. Victoria's Church, Bungan Besar, Dalat
    - St. Nicholas' Church, Kut, Dalat
    - St. James' Church, Kekan, Dalat
    - St. John the Baptist's Church, Klid, Dalat
    - St. Theresa's Church, Kebuaw Hilir, Dalat
    - St. Plechelmus' Church, Tanam, Dalat
    - St. Vincent's Church, Rassau, Dalat and
    - St. Luke's Church, Baoh, Dalat
- St. Charles Borromeo's Parish, Selangau
  - Rector(s): Rev. Michael Mandagiri, MHM (Mill Hill missionary from India)
  - Assistant(s): Rev. Wilson Karugaba, MHM (Mill Hill missionary from Uganda)
    - Sub-parishes of the Church of Mother Mary of Eucharist, Tamin and
    - St. Gerard's Church, Sekuau

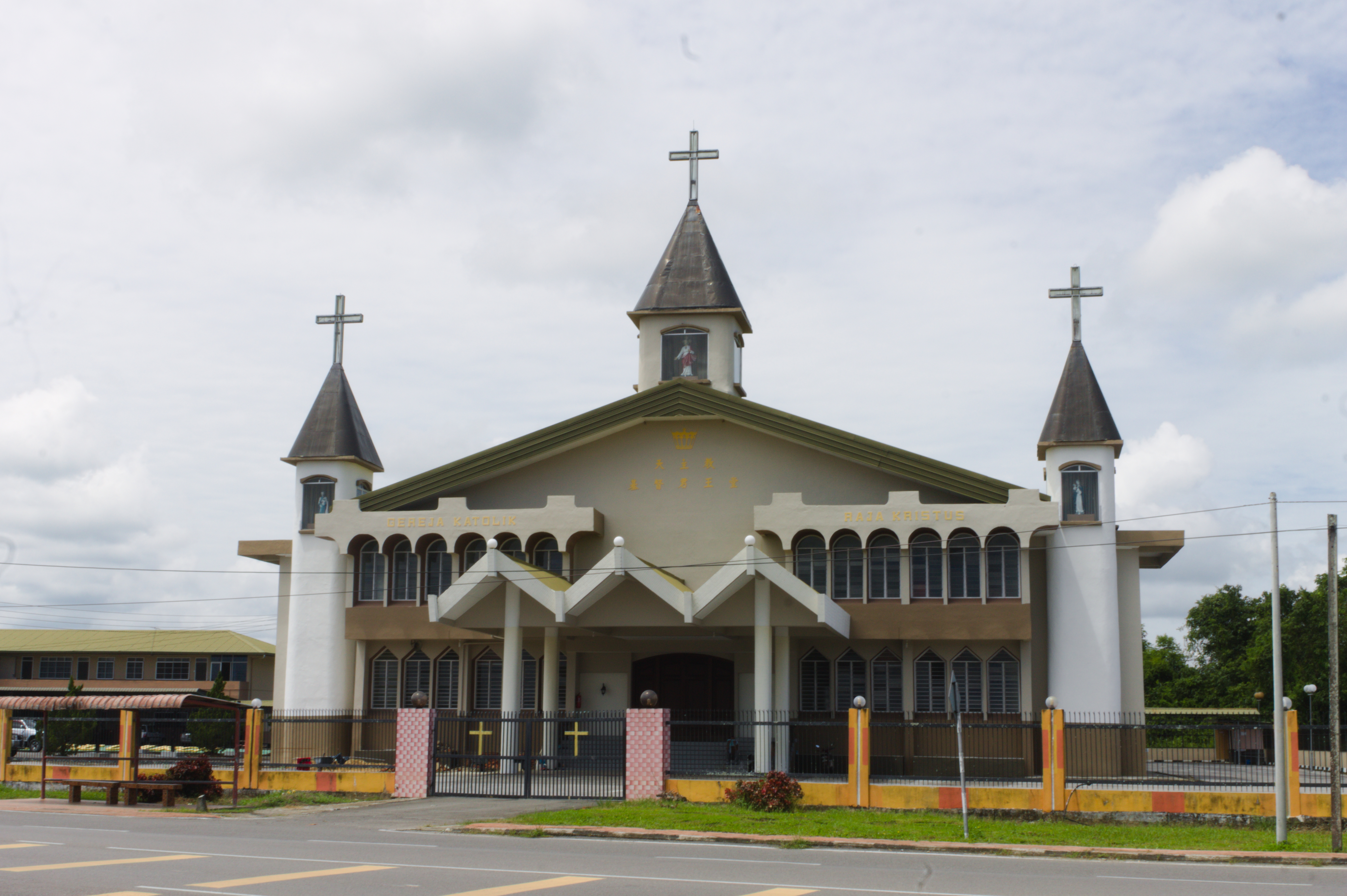
Christ the King Church, Bintangor

- Christ the King Parish, Bintangor
  - Rector(s) : Rev. Fabian Kong
  - Assistant(s): Rev. Ivan Fang, MHM (Mill Hill missionary from Brunei)
- St. Francis Xavier's Parish, Kanowit
  - Rector(s): Rev. George Omuto, MHM (Mill Hill missionary from Kenya)
  - Assistant(s): Rev. Ravi Pulagam, MHM (Mill Hill missionary from India)
    - sub-parishes of St. Andrian Church, Nanga Tada, Kanowit
    - St. Mary Church, Jagoi, Kanowit
    - St. Theresa Church, Nanga Lipus, Kanowit
    - Chapel of the Sacred Heart, Nanga Bawan, Kanowit
    - St. Leo Church, Nanga Ngungun, Kanowit
    - St. Gerald Church, Nanga Jagau, Kanowit
    - St. Sebastian Church, Machan, Kanowit
    - St. Paul Church, Tuah, Kanowit and
    - St. Vincent de Paul Church, Majau, Kanowit
- St. Herbert's Parish, Song
  - Rector(s): Rev. Philip Hu Siew Huat
  - Assistant(s): --
- St. Alphonsus Liguori's Parish, Julau
  - Rector(s): Rev. Andrew Tan (acting)
  - Assistant(s): --
    - sub-parishes of St. Patrick, Entabai, Julau and
    - St. Peter, Nanga Linggah, Julau
- Mary Immaculate Conception Parish, Kapit
  - Rector(s): Rev. Forbi Blaise Manjong, MHM (Mill Hill missionary from Cameroon)
  - Assistant(s): Rev. Olivier Lomboto, MHM (Mill Hill missionary from the Democratic Republic of the Congo)
    - sub-parishes of St. Anthony, Nanga Merit, Kapit and
    - St. Joseph, Manok Manchal, Nanga Yong, Kapit

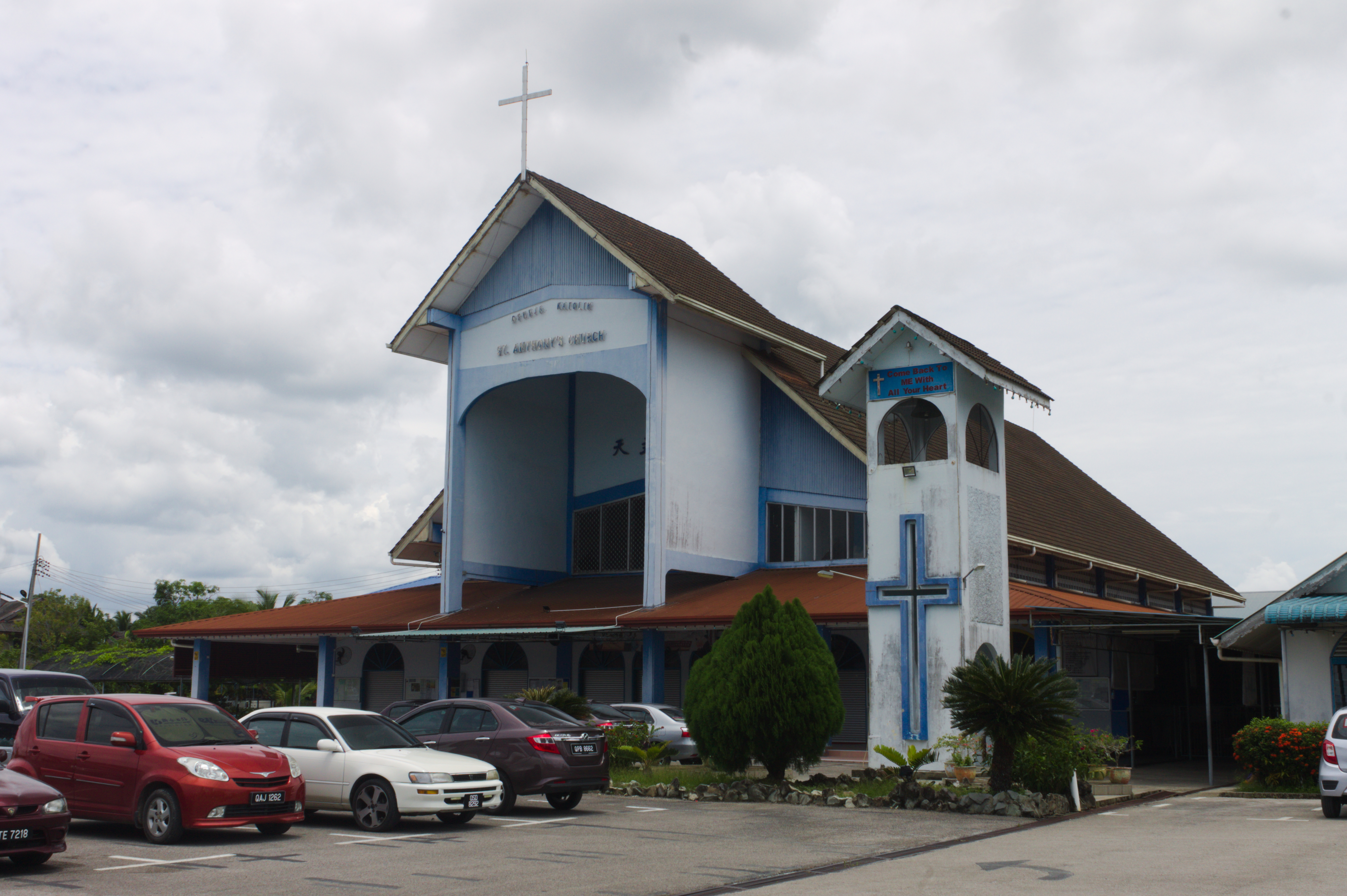
St. Anthony's Church, Sarikei

- St. Anthony's Parish, Sarikei
  - Rector(s): Rev. Simon Lau
  - Assistant(s): Rev. James Ting Siong Hung
    - sub-parishes of St. Francis of Assisi, Pakan, Sarikei
    - St. Matthew the Apostle, Engkamop, Sarikei
    - St. Mary Magdalene, Dayu, Sarikei
    - St. Patrick, Beruru, Sarikei
    - St. Joseph, Ulu Kota, Sarikei and
    - St. Andrew, Sare, Sarikei

== Religious Orders ==
- Order of Friars Minor Capuchin (OFM Cap)
- Order of Friars Minor (OFM)
- Mill Hill Missionaries (MHM)
- Claretians (CMF)
- Congregation of the Most Holy Redeemer (CSsR)
- Marist Brothers (FMS)
- Neocatechumenal Way (NCW)
- Society of Jesus (SJ)
- Discalced Carmelites (OCD)
- Sisters of St. Francis of Sarawak (SSFS)

== Missionary schools ==
=== Primary ===
- SK Sacred Heart English, Sibu
- SJK (C) Sacred Heart, Sibu
- SK St. Rita, Sibu
- SK St. Mary, Sibu
- SK Hua Hin English, Sibu
- SK St. Patrick, Mukah
- SK St. Anne, Sarikei
- SK St. Andrew, Sare, Sarikei
- SK St. Bernard, Dalat
- SK St. John Medong, Dalat
- SK St. Jude Kekan, Dalat
- SK St. Kevin Kut, Dalat
- SK St. Luke Baoh, Dalat
- SK St. Matthew, Sekuau, Selangau
- SK St. Mark, Nanga Tajam, Stapang, Selangau
- SK St. Augustine, Bintangor
- SK St. Francis Xavier, Kanowit
- SK St. Alphonsus, Julau
- SK Cardinal Vaughan, Song

=== Secondary ===
- SMK Sacred Heart, Sibu
- Catholic High School, Sibu
- SMK St. Elizabeth, Sibu
- SMK St. Patrick, Mukah
- SMK St. Anthony, Sarikei

== See also ==
- Catholic Church in Malaysia
- List of Catholic dioceses in Malaysia, Singapore and Brunei
- List of Catholic dioceses (structured view)-Episcopal Conference of Malaysia, Singapore and Brunei
