= Chapel of the Sacred Heart, Kanowit =

- Chapel of the Sacred Heart, Kanowit
- 2°8′6.30933″N 112°10′21.10594″E
- Location: Kanowit, Sibu Division, Sarawak
- Country: Malaysia
- Denomination: Roman Catholic

History
- Status: Chapel
- Founded: 1899
- Founder(s): Thomas Jackson, MHM
- Dedication: Sacred Heart

Architecture
- Years built: 1898

Administration
- Diocese: Diocese of Sibu
- Parish: St. Francis Xavier's Church, Kanowit

Clergy
- Priest(s): (Kenya) George Omuto, MHM (Parish priest) (India) Ravi Pulagam, MHM (Assistant parish priest)

Chapel of the Sacred Heart is a Roman Catholic chapel in Kanowit, Sibu Division, Sarawak, Malaysia. The chapel is situated near Rajang River. Built in the end of 19th century, it is one of the oldest church built in the state and signifies as a symbol of presence of Catholicism among the Iban people. This chapel can accommodate up to 100 worshippers at a time.

== History ==
The Mill Hill Missionaries began its activities in Sarawak in 1881 and was led by Reverend Father Jackson, the Prefect Apostolic, who was also assisted by two or three missionaries working in British North Borneo. In 1898, the chapel by the Mill Hill Missionaries near an affluent of Rajang River. This chapel was made of Bornean ironwood and serves as an outstation of Kanowit Parish.

== Restoration ==
On 2021, Unit for Other Religions under the Sarawak state government has approved MYR500,000 for restoration project of this chapel as well as a construction of a school near the cemetery area. The chapel was reopened on 22 February 2025 and was officiated by Bishop of Sibu, Joseph Hii.

== Architecture ==
The architecture is representative of the Iban architectural style and art motive, reflecting its characteristic structural and aesthetic features.

== Significance ==
The chapel represents the historical presence and spread of the Catholic faith among the local Iban community. Hence, it was chosen as one of the pilgrimage centre in Diocese of Sibu for the 2025 Jubilee, alongside St Anthony's Heritage Centre in Sarikei and St Teresa Oratory in Sungai Merah, Sibu.
