= Dominic Su Haw Chiu =

Malaysian Roman Catholic prelate (1939–2026)

His Excellency, The Most Reverend Dominic Su Haw Chiu
- Bishop Emeritus of Sibu
- Church: Roman Catholic Church
- Diocese: Sibu
- Appointed: 22 December 1986
- Installed: 11 February 1987
- Term ended: 24 December 2011
- Predecessor: Established
- Successor: Joseph Hii Teck Kwong
- Previous post: Vicar General of Archdiocese of Kuching (1981–1986)

Orders
- Ordination: 4 December 1969 by Charles Reiterer
- Consecration: 6 January 1987 by Pope John Paul II, Eduardo Martínez Somalo and Jose Tomas Sanchez

Personal details
- Born: 29 May 1939 Sibu, Raj of Sarawak
- Died: 15 May 2026 (aged 86) Sibu, Sarawak, Malaysia
- Motto: Laudetur dominus (English: Praise be to the Lord)

Styles of Dominic Su Haw Chiu
- Reference style: His Excellency; The Most Reverend
- Spoken style: Your Excellency
- Religious style: Bishop Emeritus

Dominic Su Haw Chiu
- Traditional Chinese: 蘇孝洲
- Simplified Chinese: 苏孝洲
- Hanyu Pinyin: Sū Xiàozhōu
- Jyutping: Sou1 Haau3 Zau1
- Hokkien POJ: So͘ Hàu-chiu
- Tâi-lô: Soo Hàu-tsiu

Dominic Su Haw Chiu (29 May 1939 – 15 May 2026) was a Malaysian prelate of the Catholic Church. He served as the first bishop of the Diocese of Sibu from 1987 to 2011.

== Biography ==
Su entered and studied at St Francis Xavier's Minor Seminary, Singapore, in 1961 to 1963. In 1964, he studied philosophy and theology at College General, Penang until 1969. He studied there together with his fellow seminarian Antony Selvanayagam, emeritus bishop of Penang.

He was ordained as a deacon on 28 April 1969, then to the priesthood on 4 December 1969 by the late bishop Charles Reiterer. Su then furthered his studies at Rome, to pursue Canon Law, attending the Pontifical Urbaniana University from 1979 to 1981, and from 1981 until 1986, after his return, served as a Vicar General of the Archdiocese of Kuching (1981–1986).

In 1986, Pope John Paul II appointed and consecrated Su on 6 January 1987 at St. Peter's Basilica in Rome, Italy. On 11 February 1987, Su was installed as the Bishop of the new Diocese of Sibu by Archbishop Renato Martino (now Cardinal), Apostolic Delegate to Malaysia. In 2009, Su celebrated a thanksgiving mass for his 40th anniversary of priestly ordination and 70th birthday. In 2011, he resigned for early retirement, and was succeeded by the auxiliary Bishop Joseph Hii Teck Kwong. He served as the president of the Malaysia-Singapore-Brunei Episcopal Commission for Pastoral Health Care.

Su died on 15 May 2026, at the age of 86.

Catholic Church titles
Preceded by Established	Bishop of Sibu; 1987–2011	Succeeded by Joseph Hii Teck Kwong
