= Sacred Heart Cathedral, Sibu =

Roman Catholic church in Sarawak, Malaysia

Sacred Heart Cathedral
- Malay: Katedral Hati Kudus
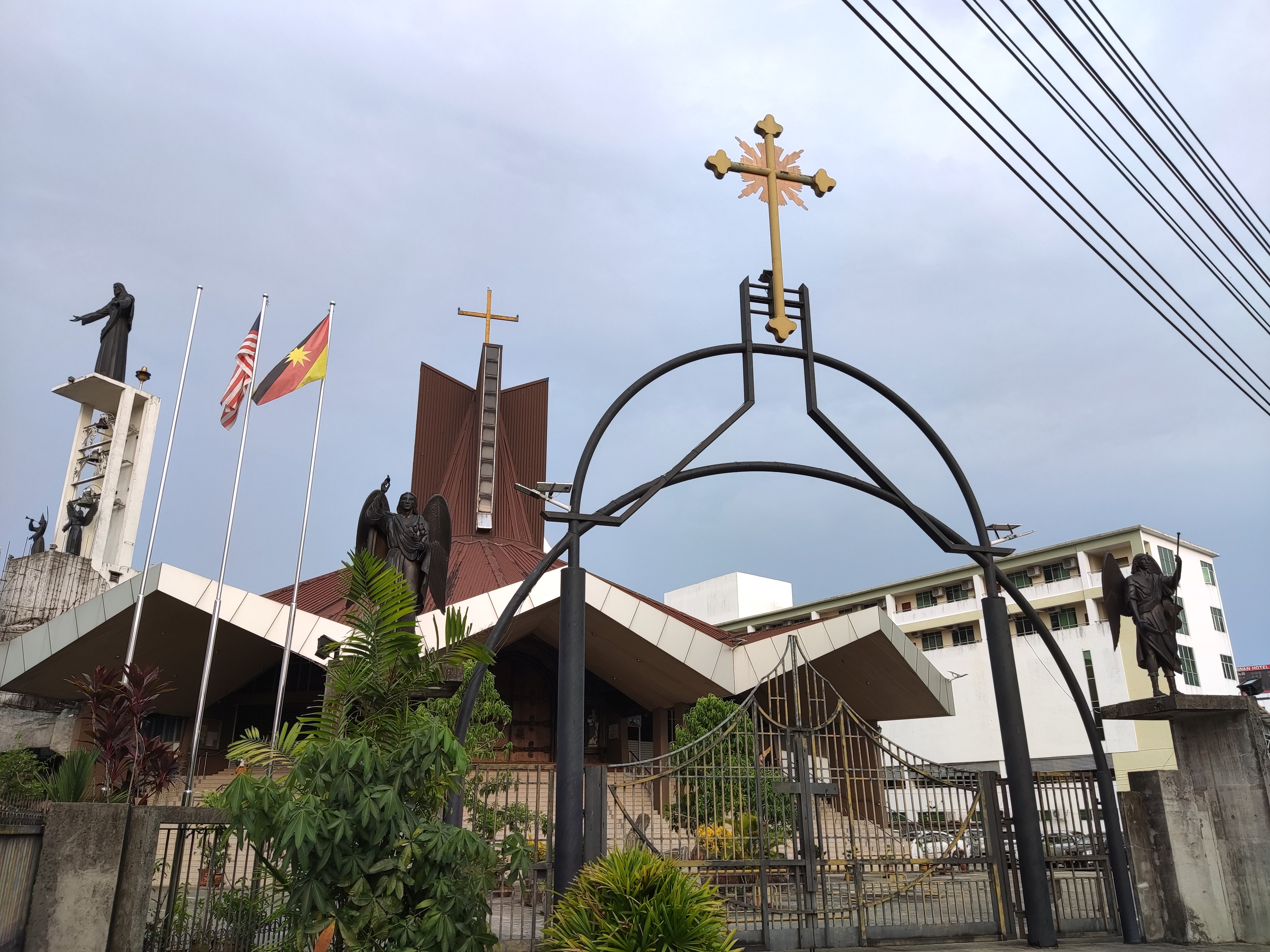
- The Cathedral in 2023

- Location within Sarawak
- 2°17′12″N 111°49′56″E
- Location: Sibu, Sarawak
- Country: Malaysia
- Language(s): English, Iban, Mandarin
- Denomination: Catholic
- Sui iuris church: Latin Church
- Tradition: Roman Rite
- Website: catholic.my/shc

History
- Status: Cathedral
- Founded: 1905 (as small chapel)
- Founder(s): Vincent Halder, MHM
- Dedication: Sacred Heart
- Consecrated: 30 July 1985

Architecture
- Closed: 1953 (first building), 1985 (second building), 1987 (elevated to cathedral status)

Specifications
- Capacity: 3,200

Administration
- Diocese: Diocese of Sibu

Clergy
- Bishop: Joseph Hii Teck Kwong
- Rector: Joseph Sebastian
- Vicar: Michael Lee Hock Chai

Sacred Heart Cathedral is a Latin Catholic cathedral in Sibu, Sarawak, Malaysia, and serves as the seat of the Bishop of Sibu, currently Joseph Hii Teck Kwong. The cathedral was originally consecrated as a church in 1985 and elevated to cathedral status in 1987. After undergoing a major renovation in 2013, it was rededicated in 2015. A shrine grotto dedicated to Mary Immaculate was completed in 2025, featuring an 18-foot-tall statue, believed to be one of the tallest representations of the Virgin Mary in the region. The cathedral is situated near Sibu Central Market and Sibu Gateway.

== History ==
Fr. Vincent Halder arrived in Sibu in 1905. He built the old Sacred Heart Church on stilts which served the Catholic community until 1953. A new Sacred Heart Church was built with brick and cement. It served the needs of the Catholic community until 1985 when the present cathedral was ready and consecrated on 30 July. The Church continued to grow during Fr. Adrian de Vos's time as rector. The Chinese Catholic community continued to increase. There was a great need for native Chinese speaking priests. This need was answered on 19 July 1955 when 3 priests arrived from Hong Kong. Fr. James Che was posted to Sibu. It was a great boost to Sibu, finally to have a Mandarin speaking priest, who also introduced the Legion of Mary. Fr. De Vos died suddenly of a heart attack when cycling to St Mary's convent. He died on 10 November 1962, aged 58.

The priestly ordination of Fr. Anthony Lam (from China) was held on 7 July 1957. He was the first priest to be ordained in Sacred Heart Church, Sibu. Fr. James Che become the rector but left for Korea during 1968 on medical grounds. He was succeeded by Fr. Joachim Phang. Fr. Henry Vollenberg also served in Sibu for three years (1965–1968) before moving to Mukah. By this time a trunk road was built from Kuching to Miri. The road cut through Iban territory and travelling to longhouses became easier. Selanggau along the Mukah river became a little township, when the road passed through. The Mission had acquired a piece of land next to the road, where a handsome church St Charles was built. The priests from Sibu looked after the Iban communities, who were previously serving in the Dalat and Mukah missions.

Fr. Dignum Marcus travelled extensively for nine years visiting longhouses by boat, on foot or by car. Many longhouse occupants embraced the faith. It was also mainly through him that a Than Parish Council was formed to work together and get support to cover the large area. Some Mill Hill priests (Frs. James Tollan and John Bede Morgan) were put in charge of the youth. Fr. Morgan introduced the Boy Scouts and cared for the altar boys. They only stayed a couple of years. A Malaysian government's ruling that only allowed a ten years stay for missionaries arriving after Malaysia Day (31 August 1963) was taking its toll. Fr. Ferdinand Vergeer's special skills for catechetists proved most useful in Sibu, giving the Confraternity of Christian Doctrine (CCD) a lot of help in teaching young people from non mission schools Catholic doctrine. Fr. Anthony van Vught travelled with Sibu as base to the remote areas of Selangau.

Fr. Vincent Oates travelled both the Oya and Mukah extensively. He left before the cathedral was completed. Fr. James Muhren had a special place for young people in his heart. He served in Sacred Heart for 5 years taking a great interest in the youth. Fr. John Ha (now Archbishop Emeritus of Kuching; Dato') served almost a year.

Fr. Peter Ng, the first local priest from the parish, was ordained on 15 December 1968. Then came the 3 brother of the Su's family, i.e. Fr. Dominic Su (now Bishop Emeritus), Fr. Francis Su and Fr. Philip Su who were ordained on 4 December 1969, 15 April 1974 and 1 May 1979 respectively. Fr. Thomas Taam became rector in that same year. Many remaining expatriate Mill Hill fellow priests enjoyed his hospitality and company for almost 20 years in Sacred Heart as rector.

The solemn dedication of the Sacred Heart Church was on 30 July 1985. Fr. Michael Lee was the first priest (and another native son of the parish as well as the town of Sibu) to be ordained in the new Church on 22 October 1985.

The rector, Fr. Thomas Taam, bought a semi detached house costing RM 100,000 at Rejang Park as a Catholic Centre.

The priestly ordination of Fr. James Ting was held on 16 June 1988. Two building projects were constructed and completed in the year 1988, i.e. Sibu Diocesan Centre cum Bishop's House at the cost of RM 800,000 and St. Anne's Chapel, Paradom of RM 115,000. Rector, Fr. Thomas Taam, also bought a detached house for RM 125,000 to be used as a Catholic Centre in Sukun Area.

The construction of Wisma Katolik costing RM1.5 million and Catholic Centre, Belatok at RM 300,000 were completed in 1991.

Three boys from Sacred Heart Parish, Fr. Joseph Hii (now Bishop), Fr. Alphonsus Tang and Fr. Andrew Tan were ordained as priests together on 25 March 1993.

Sacred Heart Minor Seminary costing RM2 million was completed on 3 December 1994. His Lordship, Bishop Dominic Su, celebrated his Sacerdotal Silver Jubilee on the following day.

The priestly ordination of Fr. Paul Chee was held on 1 January 1996.

The new Priests' House costing RM 700,000 was declared open by Rt. Rev. Bishop Dominic Su on 19 June 1998 on the Feast Day of Sacred Heart of Jesus.

After many years in Kapit area, Fr. Thomas Connors was appointed to Sacred Heart Parish from this year to look after the Iban Catholics. Fr. Thomas Taam was appointed rector of St. Teresa's Church. Fr. James Ting took over from Fr. Thomas Taam.

In 2015, the cathedral was renovated and re-dedicated with a new touch and a larger sitting capacity of 3,200 overall (900 people on the upper level pews).

== Mass Times ==
Mass Times as stated in the official website:

Mass	Time & Language
Weekday Mass (Monday-Friday)	6:15 am - Mandarin (M); 5:30 pm - English (E); 7:30 pm (First Friday of the month)
Sunday Mass	7:00 am - Mandarin (M); 9:00 am; 3:15 pm - Bahasa Iban (I); 11:00 am; 5:30 pm - English (E)
Sunset Mass	5:00 pm - Novena; 6:00 pm - English (E)
Holy Hour	7:30 pm to 8:30 pm (Friday)
Bible Reading	7:30 pm (Thursday)
