= St. Anthony's National Secondary School, Sarawak =

St. Anthony's National Secondary School
- Sekolah Menengah Kebangsaan St. Anthony
- Lot 658, Block 36, Sarikei Land District KM 1, Jalan Repok, 96100; Sarikei, Sarawak; Malaysia

Information
- Type: secondary, public
- Motto: NON SCHOLAE SED VITAE (Education is for Life)
- Religious affiliation: Christian
- Denomination: Roman Catholic Church (St. Anthony of Padua Church, Sarikei)
- Established: 1932
- Founder: Fr. Charles Quadekker, MHM
- Principal: Mr. Vincent Leong Shou Chuan (2017-now)
- Enrolment: 2000
- Feeder schools: SK St. Anne; SK St. Andrew; SK St. Augustine, Bintangor
- Affiliation: Ministry of Education of Malaysia; Diocese of Sibu
- Website: http://smkstanthony.uuuq.com

St. Anthony's National Secondary School (Malay: Sekolah Menengah Kebangsaan St. Anthony) is a public secondary school in Sarikei, Sarawak, in East Malaysia. The school was established in 1932. Currently, there are about 2000 students and more than 100 teachers in the school.

== History and Timeline ==
The roots of St Anthony's School can be traced back to 1932 when Bishop John Baus started the school in one wooden shack on the side of Repok Road where the current priest's abode and the old St. Anthony's Church are. The school was named after St Anthony Padua.

The first principal was Ambrose Wong Ik Loi. Imagine heading a school with 8 students in 1932 and 24 students in 1933. He was the only teacher.

Rev Father C. Quadekker secured the land across Repok Road in 1935 and built a block with 4 classrooms at the present location of St Anthony's School. The number of students rose to 31.

Father Quadekker was considered by some as the founder of St Anthony's School. The school was a building on stilts which was half school & half quarters for the teachers with a kitchen behind. The principal, Rev Quadekker, lived in one of the classrooms & slept in the dormitory.

By 1936, there were 70 students. There were very few books. A student usually spent 6 years with 1 book and caning is common. The school was co-ed and there was no school bell!

A new block made of hardy belian wood was completed in 1937. By then, the school had 5 teachers: Mr. Tion Heng Ing, Mr. Johnson, Mr. Yii Sii Ann, Mr. Wong Ing King, Mrs. Chieng.

Another block of general office and a house for Father Quadekker was built in 1940. During World War II from 1941-1945, the school was used by the Japanese as a camp for hundreds of its soldiers.

From 1946-1955, the school had 2 principals (Rev J Buis and Father J Chin). During this period, the school population grew to 200 students. In 1956, the school was managed by Rev Priest J Hol and Mc Hugh. The first group of Form 3 students sat for SRP (Sijil Rendah Pelajaran / Lower Education Certificate) in 1956. A school hall named Father Chin Jubilee Hall was completed.

Father Rottinghuis took over the helm in 1956-1972. In 1960, the historic Science Block (now St Francis Block) was built with 2 labs and 3 classes. The pioneer batch of students sat for Senior Cambridge Examination in 1962. In 1967, the primary school of St Anthony's School was relocated, leading to the beginning of St Anne's Primary School.

KA Titus was the last foreigner who headed St Anthony's School from 1972-1980. Government policy mandates that principals have to be citizens after this. During his tenure, the number of students increased to 800. A new block (now St Elizabeth Block) was opened in 1973. Other facilities like basketball court, bicycle shed, car porch for staff, extension of toilets and school fence were built.

1981-1982: Gerald Lee.

1983-1984: Tsai Jit Jui. A new block was added.

1985-1986: Jackson Chan Tian Ann from Kuching took over. A computer club was formed.

1986-1996: Andrew Wong Ee Hin. Three new 4-storey blocks were built from 1991-1995 (Blocks St Augustine, St Bernard, St Christopher)

1996-1997: Judith Wong Ngee Lay. Two additional Science labs were built, basketball court, volleyball court were upgraded.

1997-2001: Sylvester Tang Nguon Sam. The covered pathway to Physics and chemistry lab, refurnishing the floors of front of Block A and Block C with tar and upgraded of students toilets were done.

2001-2004: Sim Tong Hui. PIBG was formed in 2002. Single storey "Demonstration Room" block D was replaced by a 4-Storey concrete building (Block St Daniel). SMB St Anthony change to SMK St Anthony in 2002. In 2003, St Anthony started 2 classes of Lower 6.

2004-2005: Fong Yut Kuen. Upgrading the staff room and Dewan Kuliah was carried out.

2005-2010: Georgina Wong Leh Ting. Facilities in the school were upgraded and well maintained.

2010-2017: Alex Sali Anak Sumoh. A new hall was built in 2010 and was completed by 2011, which took one year to finish.

Through the efforts of the principals, teachers and supporting staff of SAS from 1932 – 2017, SAS has evolved from its humble roots to an excellent school in academic and co-curriculum activities. SAS had won many awards at divisional, state and national levels. With the support of parents, the students and ex-Anthonians, the school can look forward to continue to excel.
