= Kanowit =

Kanowit Pekan Kanowit
- Town and district capital

Other transcription(s)
  - Chinese: 加拿逸
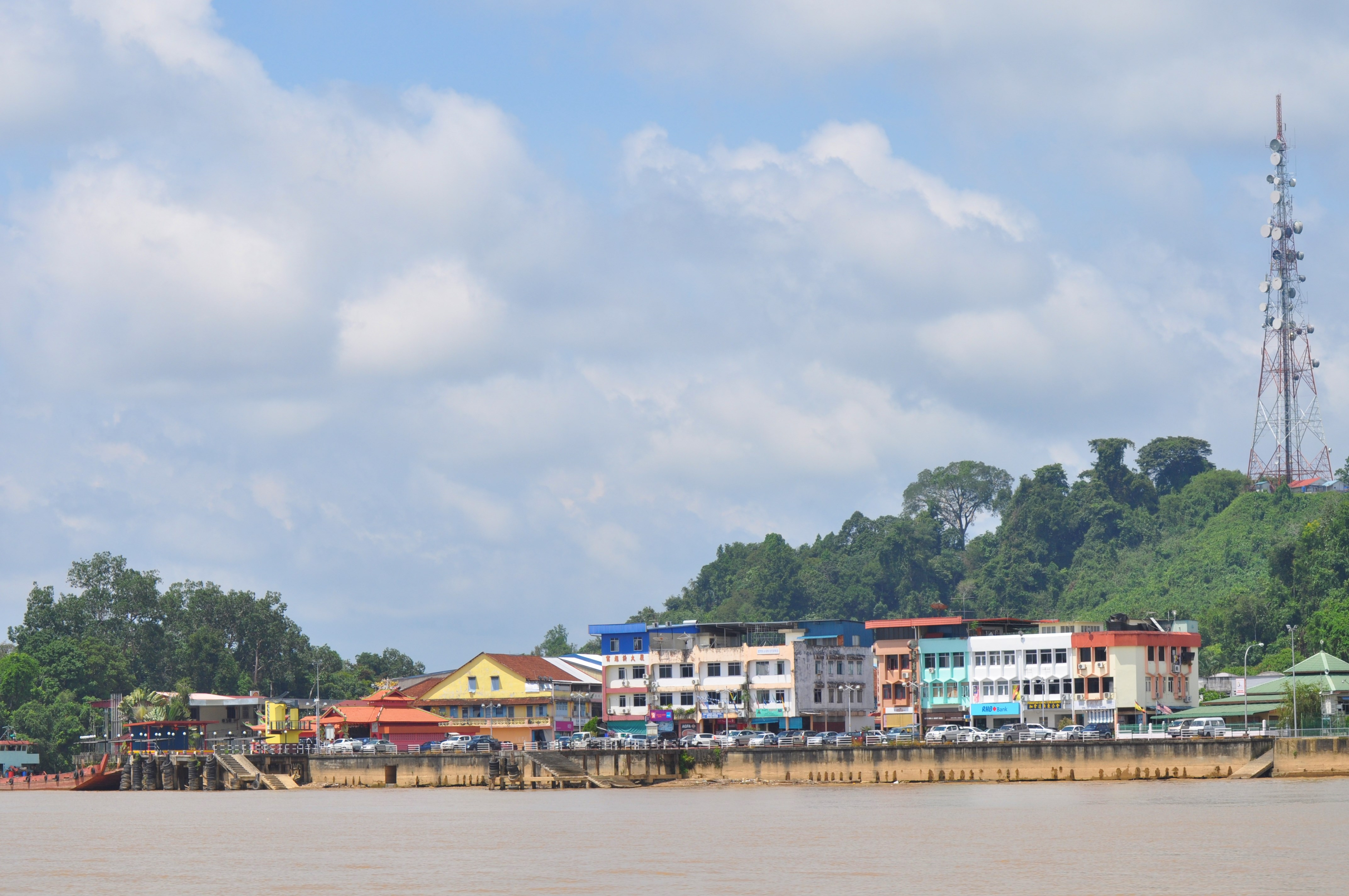

- Seal

- Location within Borneo
- Coordinates: 2°06′0″N 112°09′0″E
- Country: Malaysia
- State: Sarawak
- Division: Sibu
- District: Kanowit

Population (2010)
  - Total: 28,985
- Website: http://www.kanowitdc.sarawak.gov.my/

Kanowit (Malay: Pekan Kanowit) is a town and the capital of Kanowit District, Sibu Division, Sarawak, Malaysia, comprising 2,253.5 square kilometres. As of 2010, Kanowit's population is 28,985. It is built on the mouth of Kanowit River at the bank of Rajang River, approximately 174 kilometers from the coast of South China Sea. It takes 45 minutes to reach the town by land transport and an hour by boat from Sibu. The main ethnic groups are Iban, Chinese, Malay, and Melanau.

The town takes its name from the Kanowit, a Melanau ethnic group called Rajang by the Ibans (ISO 639-3: kxn). The language is still spoken by the Kanowit people living in the area.

The village where the Kanowit people live is known as Kampung Bedil, a short trip by boat up the Rajang River from Kanowit town.

== Etymology ==
The name "Kanowit" is derived from the name of the earliest ethnic group settling along the Kanowit River. The ethnic group adopted similar culture as the Melanau ethnic group. Therefore, they are often called as the "Melanau of Kanowit". Their languages is classified as the languages related to the people from Oya, Mukah, and Matu District. They had their own social rankings: aristocrats, middle class, and slaves. Their houses were 40 foot tall, although such houses no longer exists today. They were well known of their basketry which were sold in the Kanowit Bazaar (market). (Note: Richard C, 2010. Pages 47, 48)

== History ==
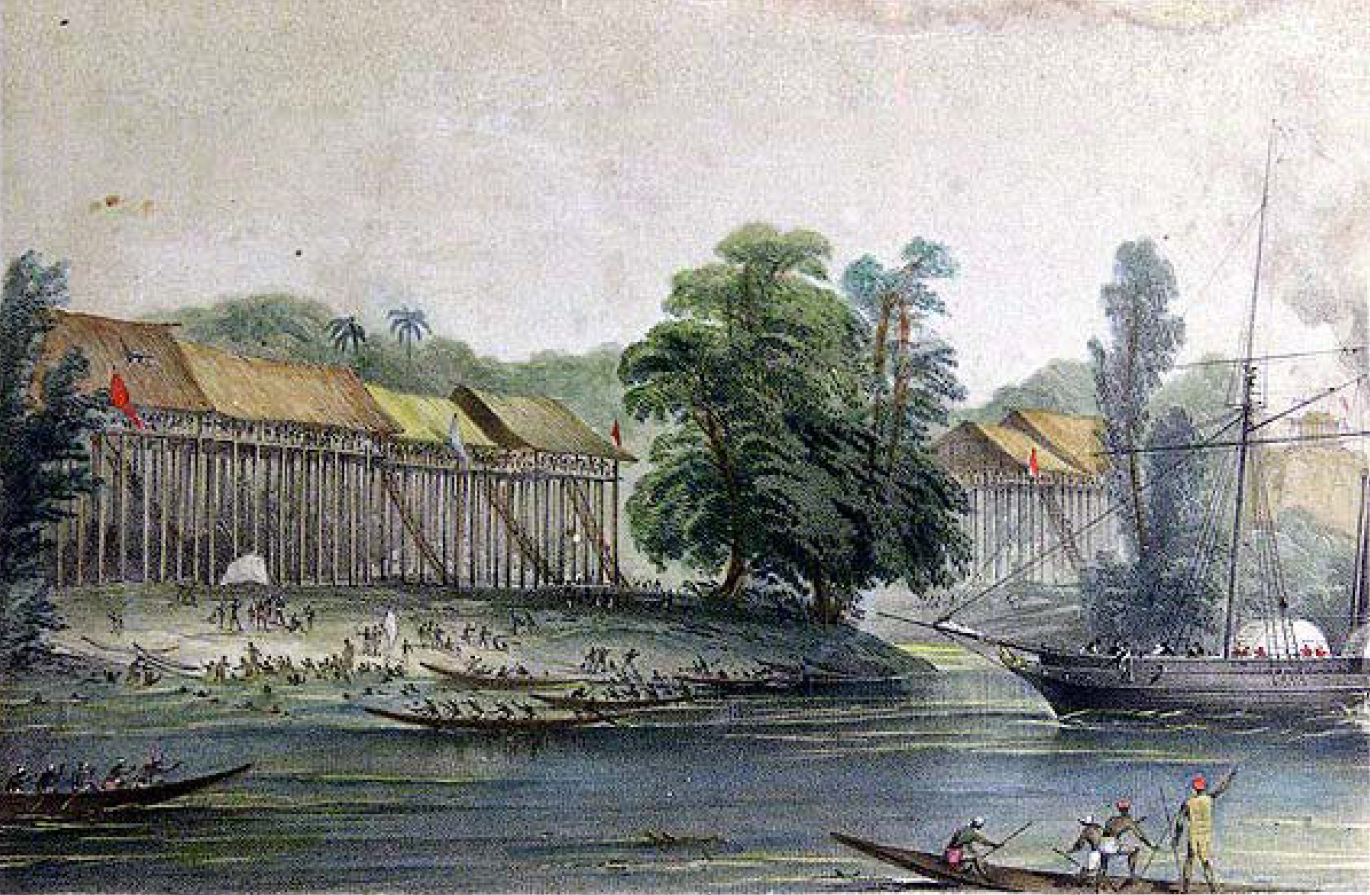
HEICS Phlegethon visits Kanowit on 29 Jun 1846

In 1846, Phlegethon ship commanded by Captain Rodney Mundy and James Brooke sail up the Rajang River to combat Dayak piracy that frequently threatened the borders of Sarawak (Kuching area). On 29 June, Rodney and James arrived at Kanowit and their first contact with the "Kanowit" people there was peaceful. In 1851, Fort Emma was built by the Brookes although Kanowit was still under the control of Bruneian empire. The fort was named after the sister of James Brooke, Emma Brooke. Emma Brooke was also the mother of the second Rajah of Sarawak, Charles Anthony Brooke. (Note: Richard C, 2010. Page 21, 46, 47) In 1853, James Brooke was able to take over Rajang River and its surrounding settlements from the Brunei Sultanate. Fort Emma offered protection against Dayak piracy along the Rajang River. Therefore, Hokkien Chinese from Singapore and Fujian province of China came to settle in Kanowit during the 1870s, while Sibu was still a small Malay village at that time. Chinese traders from Singapore brought clothes, jars, salt, and other daily necessities in exchange for rattan, hides of wild cattle, camphor, rhinoceros horns, and monkeys gall stones. The Cantonese people later arrived in the 1880s. They were involved in timber exports. (Note: Richard C, 2010. Page 53) The Fuzhounese arrived here from Sibu in 1910. (Note: Richard C, 2010. Page 54) Besides, Malay villages also established just immediate south to the fort. (Note: Richard C, 2010. Page 124) In 1883, Father Edmund Dunn of St Joseph College, Mill Hill, England, established the first Roman Catholic Mission headquarters at Kanowit. The missionary at that time worked almost exclusively amongst the Iban people (Note: Richard C, 2010. Page 124, 125) In 1885, St Francis Xavier Church was built. The church was demolished in 1967 to pave the way for new modern building construction. (Note: Richard C, 2010. Page 125, 126) Meanwhile in 1898, a chapel, Chapel of the Sacred Heart, Kanowit was also built by Mill Hill Missionaries. Later a mission hospital and a primary school was built. A boat to bring emergency cases to Sibu was provided. (Note: Richard C, 2010. Page 127)

In June 1859, Syarif Masahor, (Note: Richard C, 2010. Page 70) together with a "Kanowit" leader named "Sawing", and a number of Malay chiefs killed two Brooke government officials, Charles Fox and Henry Steele. (Note: Richard C, 2010. Page 70) In 1906, a peacemaking ceremony was performed between Kana and Iban tribes here.

During the last years of the Japanese occupation, the Kanowit bazaar was looted and burnt to the ground by some natives. In 1951, as the Korean War broke out, the Kanowit bazaar was overflowing with rubber sheets due to rise in rubber prices. However, on 8 November 1951, the bazaar was burnt to the ground in a large fire. (Note: Richard C, 2010. Page 129) Construction of the shophouses was restarted from 1952 to 1953. However, several owners were unable to pay the mortgages owed to Chartered Bank in Sibu due to low collapsing rubber prices. (Note: Richard C, 2010. Page 130)

In the 1970s, there were 48 shophouses in Kanowit, lying parallel to the Kanowit River. There was also a market, churches, a hospital, (Note: Richard C, 2010. Page 5) a moving picture theatre (named Capital Theatre), (Note: Richard C, 2010. Page 100) a jetty, government offices, government resident quarters, a government clinic, and a community hall. (Note: Richard C, 2010. Page 110) The Chinese were settled near the banks of the Rajang River. There were no roads that enter the town. Therefore, the Rajang River is the only mode of transport for people to travel to other towns. (Note: Richard C, 2010. Page 5)

== Government ==
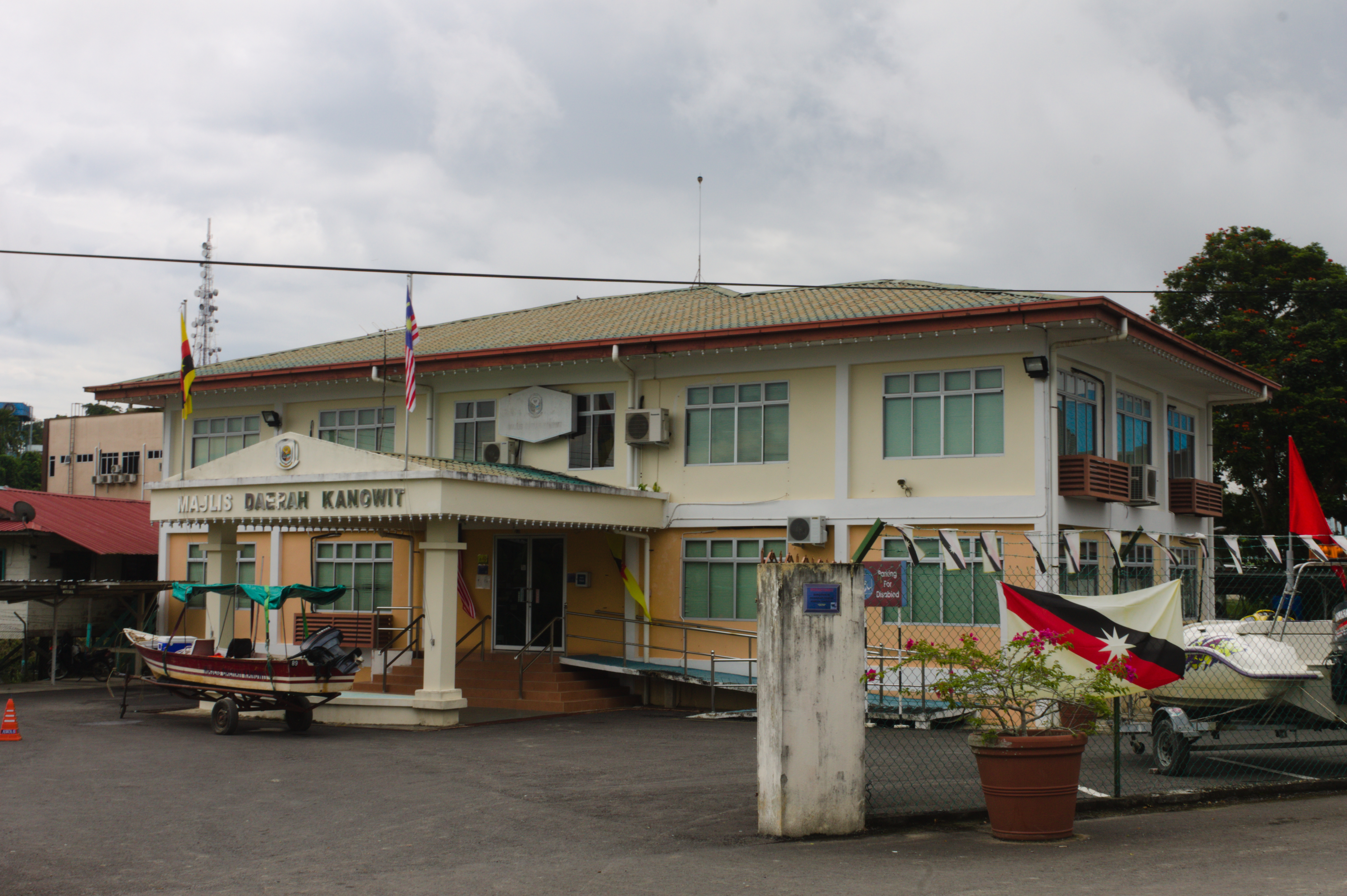
Kanowit District Council

The town of Kanowit is the capital of the Kanowit District. (Note: Richard C, 2010. Page 17) The Kanowit district is administered by a District officer, an assistant officer, administrative officers, treasurer, clerks, and other office employees. (Note: Richard C, 2010. Page 17) Kanowit District Council was first known as Kanowit Sea Dayak Local Authority when it was established in 1949. In 1957, the council name was changed to its present name. Julau was previously a sub-district under the jurisdiction of the Kanowit District. In 1973, Julau was upgraded into a district and put under the administration of Sarikei Division. In the 1960s, there were 24 democratically elected representatives in the Kanowit District Council. The Kanowit District was in turn put under the jurisdiction of the Third Division of Sarawak (also known as Sibu Division today). (Note: Richard C, 2010. Page 18) In the 1970s, the Kanowit government secondary school was the only secondary school apart from Sibu in the Rajang basin. (Note: Richard C, 2010. Page 155)

Kanowit is represented in the Dewan Rakyat as part of the Kanowit federal constituency.

== Geography ==
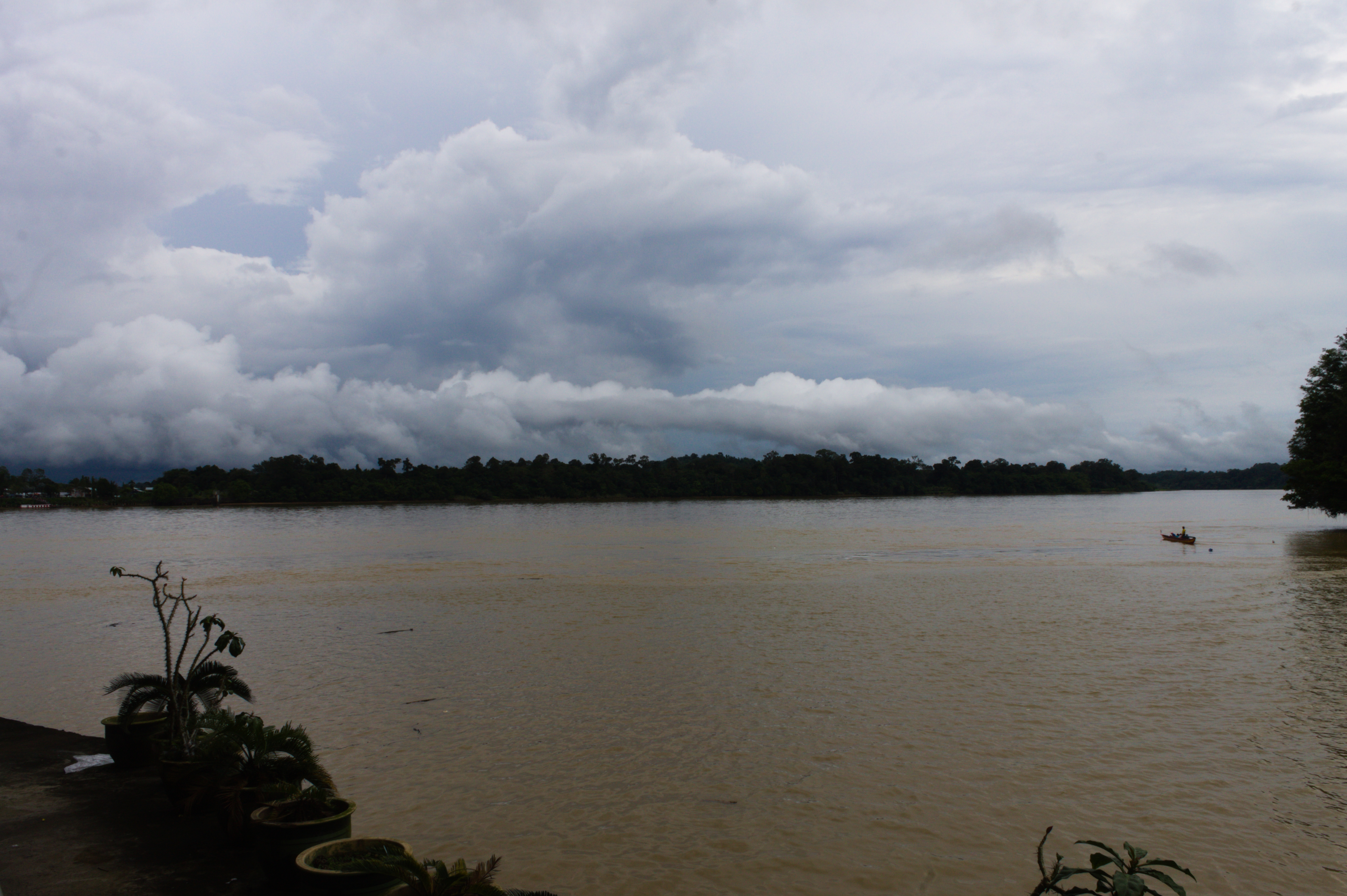
Confluence between the Rajang and the Kanowit River

Kanowit is located at 105 miles (169 km) miles from the sea, near the Rajang River. Although the Rajang flows from east to west in its general course of direction, the river is flowing from south to north in Kanowit, with the Kanowit river entering Rajang south to north. The part of Rajang River near Kanowit is 0.5 miles (0.80 km) wide. The town of Kanowit is located in the north-south direction. (Note: Richard C, 2010. Page 5)

The area around Kanowit contains mostly tertiary stage of Paleozoic rocks such as sandstones, greywicks, siltstone, shales, and slate. During the Peneplanation and Jerudong cycles, the erosions of the hills in the central Rajang basin has reduced their elevations to 200 to 300 feet, when compared to 3,000 to 5,000 feet mountains located near the Sarawak-Kalimantan border. The riverbanks at Kanowit are below sea level; therefore, Kanowit is subject to frequent flooding during periods of monsoon seasons. (Note: Richard C, 2010. Page 8,9) There are three types of soils in the Kanowit area: acid yellow soils found in the mountainous areas, podsols derived from sandy material at the moderately high terrains, and alluvial deposits at the flood plain areas. (Note: Richard C, 2010. Page 13)

== Climate ==
Kanowit has a tropical rainforest climate (Af) with heavy to very heavy rainfall year-round.

Climate data for Kanowit
Month	Jan	Feb	Mar	Apr	May	Jun	Jul	Aug	Sep	Oct	Nov	Dec	Year
Mean daily maximum °C (°F)	30.1 (86.2)	30.3 (86.5)	31.3 (88.3)	31.9 (89.4)	32.3 (90.1)	32.1 (89.8)	32.0 (89.6)	31.7 (89.1)	31.6 (88.9)	31.5 (88.7)	31.3 (88.3)	30.7 (87.3)	31.4 (88.5)
Daily mean °C (°F)	26.1 (79.0)	26.2 (79.2)	27.0 (80.6)	27.2 (81.0)	27.6 (81.7)	27.3 (81.1)	27.1 (80.8)	26.9 (80.4)	26.9 (80.4)	27.0 (80.6)	26.8 (80.2)	26.4 (79.5)	26.9 (80.4)
Mean daily minimum °C (°F)	22.2 (72.0)	22.2 (72.0)	22.7 (72.9)	22.6 (72.7)	22.9 (73.2)	22.5 (72.5)	22.2 (72.0)	22.1 (71.8)	22.3 (72.1)	22.5 (72.5)	22.4 (72.3)	22.2 (72.0)	22.4 (72.3)
Average rainfall mm (inches)	351 (13.8)	293 (11.5)	315 (12.4)	248 (9.8)	279 (11.0)	227 (8.9)	177 (7.0)	244 (9.6)	315 (12.4)	288 (11.3)	288 (11.3)	362 (14.3)	3,387 (133.3)
Source: Climate-Data.org

== Demographics ==
The total population in the Kanowit Bazaar (market) in 1960 was 1,555. (Note: Richard C, 2010. Page 40) It increased by 13% to 1,720 in August 1970, where 72.7% of them were Chinese and 18.1% were the Malays. Among the Chinese, Hokkien accounted for 48.8% of the population, followed by Cantonese (21.4%), and Fuzhounese (20.1%). (Note: Richard C, 2010. Page 28) The Iban people made up 6.5% of the population in the Kanowit bazaar. Outside the Kanowit bazaar, the Iban people were the majority. Some Malay families may raise or adopt children from other races. Therefore, names such as "Abdul Chen" and "Aminah Lim" may appear. (Note: Richard C, 2010. Page 60, 61) All the ethnic groups in the Kanowit Bazaar only started arriving in the last 200 years. The "Kanowit" ethnic group, where the town is named after them, is known to be the earliest inhabitants along the Kanowit River. Few of the "Kanowit" people still staying in Kampung Bedil today. (Note: Richard C, 2010. Page 45) The Kampung Bedil has about 40 houses with a population of 200 in the year 2015.

=== Languages ===
In the 1970s, there were seven widely spoken languages in Kanowit: English, Malay, Iban, Mandarin, Hokkien, Fuzhounese, and Cantonese. About 30% of the population at that time speak English. 90% of the population in Kanowit can speak Iban, including 70 to 80% of the Chinese. Meanwhile, 18% of the Kanowit people spoke Malay. (Note: Richard C, 2010. Page 42,43) Hokkien was the most widely spoken Chinese dialect in Kanowit during the 1970s. At that time, 48.8% of the Chinese spoke Hokkien, 40 to 50% of the Chinese spoke Fuzhounese, and 90% of the Chinese spoke Mandarin. Most of the Kanowit population was able to converse in more than one languages. (Note: Richard C, 2010. Page 44)

=== Religions ===
In the 1970s, 21% of the Kanowit bazaar population was Christians while 19% of the population was Muslims. Meanwhile, 60% of the population was devoted to other religions. (Note: Richard C, 2010. Page 173)

== Economy ==
Kanowit acts as a middleman of trade between the town of Sibu and people from the interior of the Rajang River. Kanowit exports rural agricultural products to the outside world. At the same time, manufactured goods from the outside world are imported for daily use by the Kanowit residents. (Note: Richard C, 2010. Page xi) Among the items available for trade in the Kanowit bazaar are: hill rice, vegetables, chicken, pigs, fish, and fresh-water shrimp. Rubber and pepper are also cultivated in Kanowit. (Note: Richard C, 2010. Page 15) Kanowit also produces rubber and black pepper. (Note: Richard C, 2010. Pages 72 to 76) Before 1970s, Kanowit acted as a transshipment centre for timbers coming from the Rajang upriver. After the freeze of new timber licenses in the 1970s, the effect of timber on the local economy has been reducing. (Note: Richard C, 2010. Page 14) Majority of the businesses in Kanowit were retail grocery businesses. Other business were: tailors, (Note: Richard C, 2010. Page 97) coffeshops, (Note: Richard C, 2010. Page 101) hairdressers, and food stalls. (Note: Richard C, 2010. Page 97)

== Transport ==
=== Local Bus ===
Fee of local bus is only RM1, but bus service is not frequently.

Route No.	Operating Route	Operator	Remark
20	Sibu-Kanowit	Lanang Bus	

=== Bus Express ===
Operating Route	Operator	Remark
Sibu-Kapit	Kapit Bus Express, BusAsia, Lanang Bus	

=== Water ===
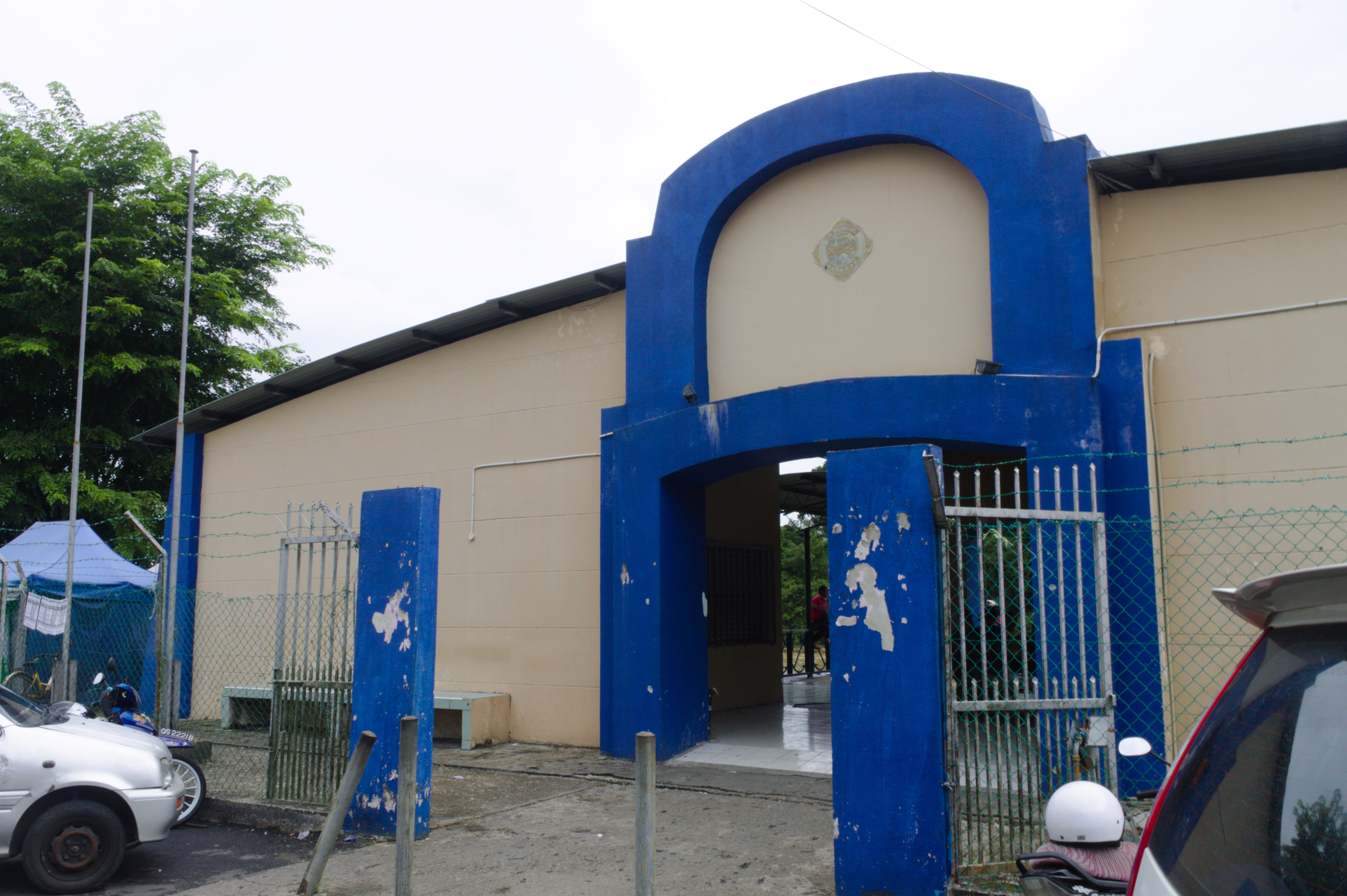
Kanowit wharf terminal

Express boats from Kanowit can reach Sibu in one and a half hours. (Note: Richard C, 2010. Page 8)

== Education ==
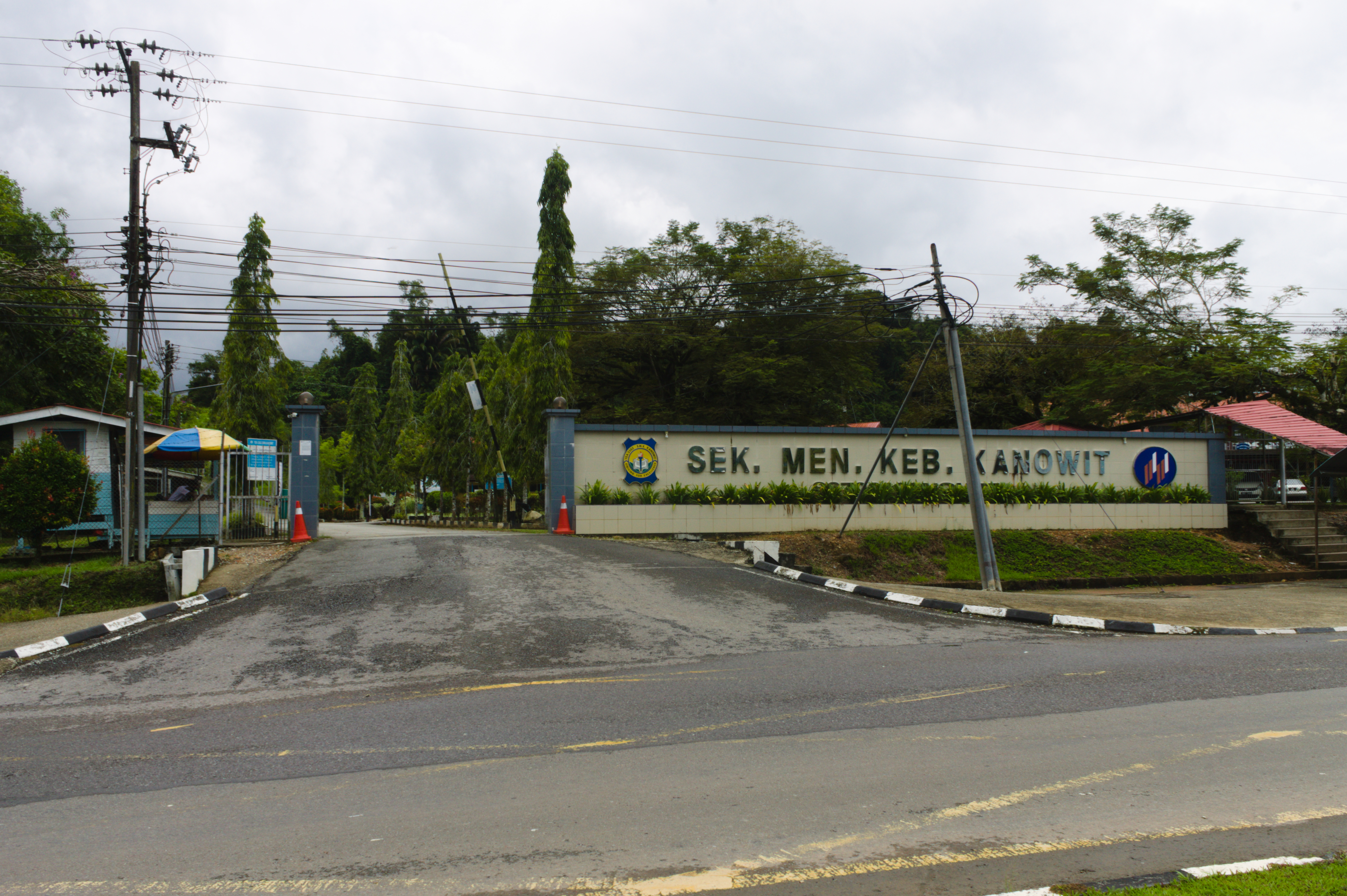
SMK Kanowit

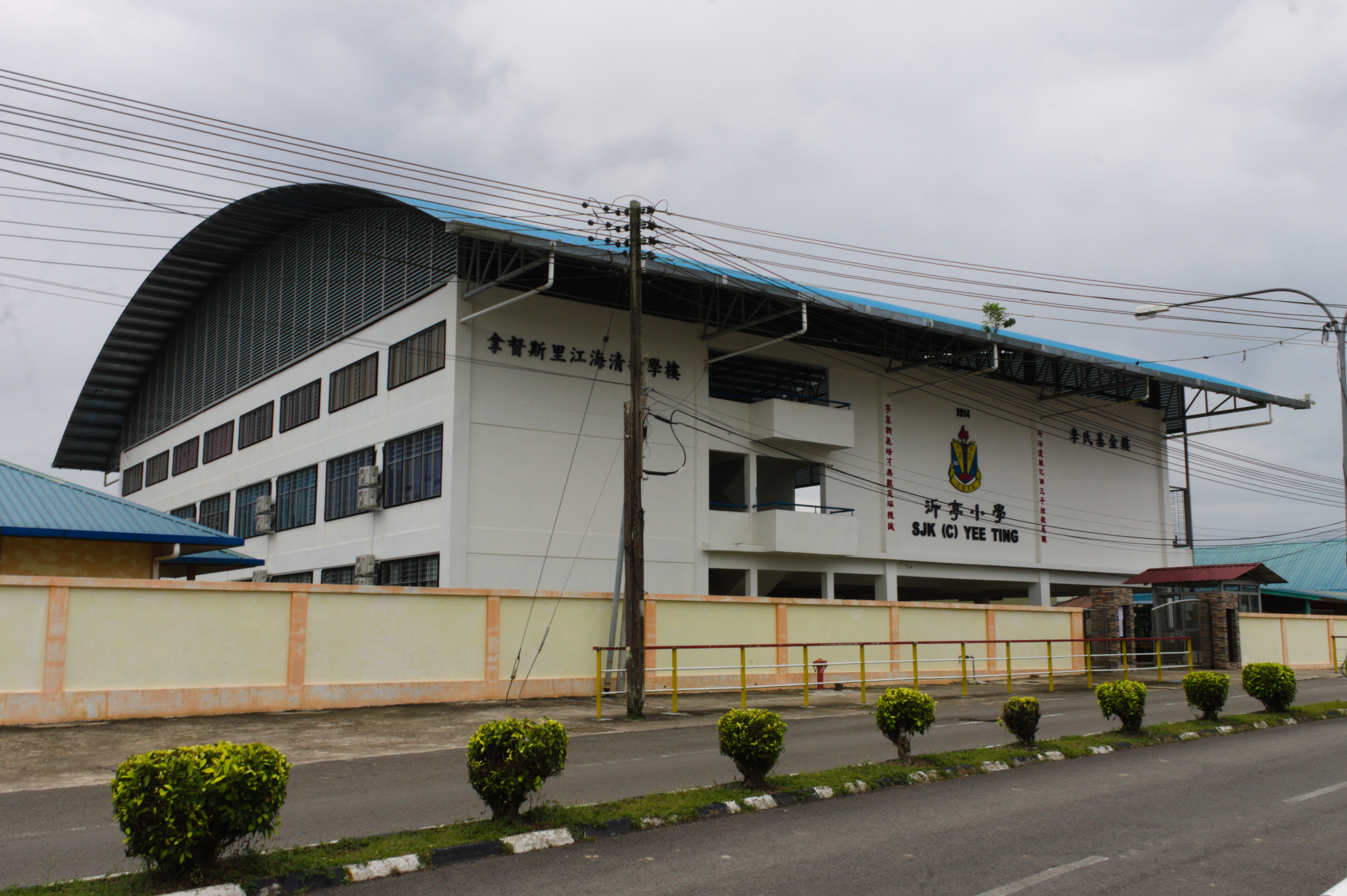
SJK(C) Yee Ting

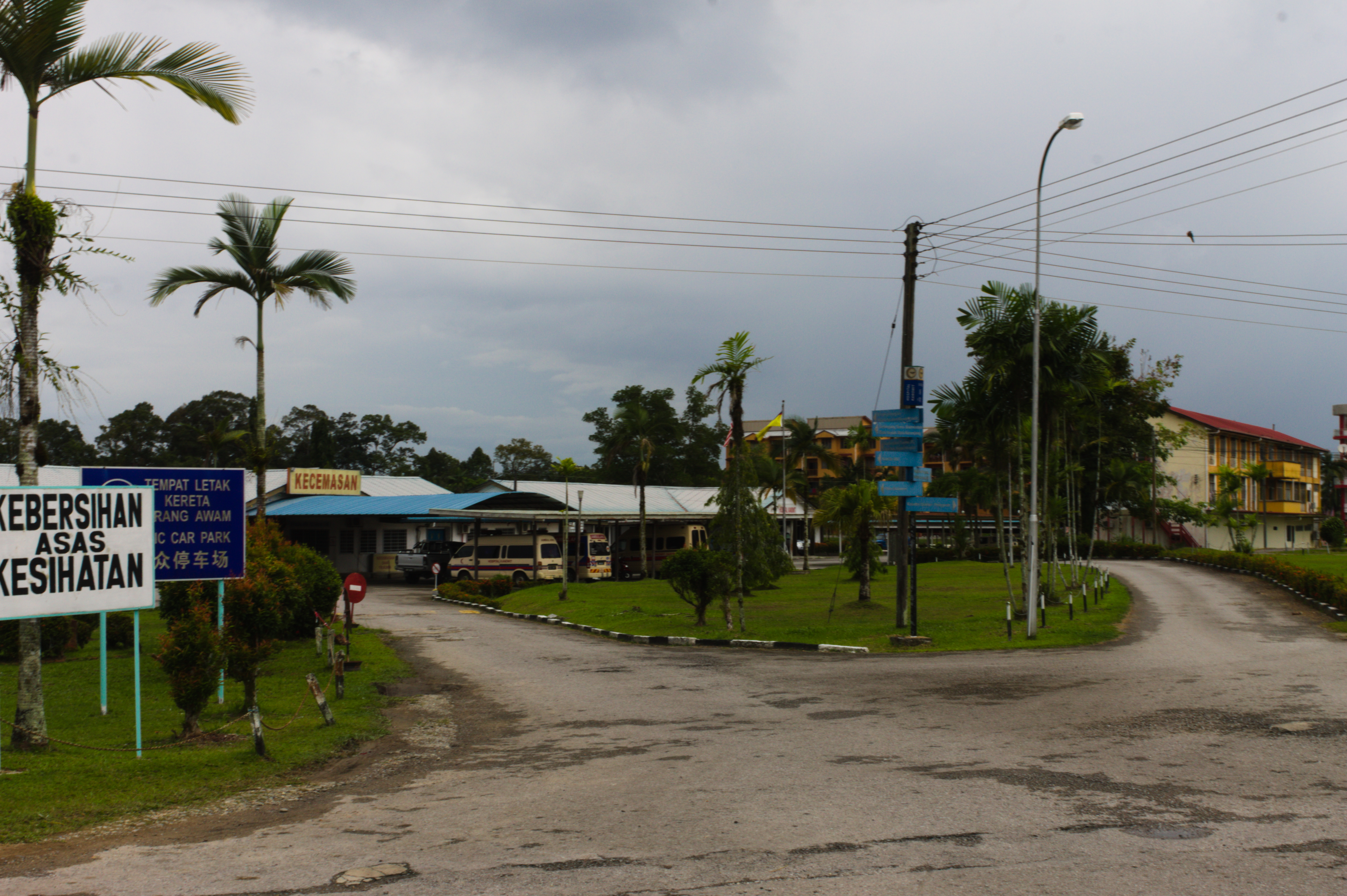
Kanowit Hospital emergency department

The town has two primary schools:

- Sekolah Rendah Kebangsaan St. Francis Xavier (the earliest primary school in Sarawak, founded in 1883)
- Sekolah Rendah Kebangsaan Yee Ting, a Chinese-run government school

and three secondary schools:

- Sekolah Menengah Kebangsaan Kanowit
- Sekolah Menengah Kebangsaan Datuk Haji Abdul Rahman Yakub
- Sekolah Menengah Kebangsaan Nanga Dap

== Culture and leisure ==
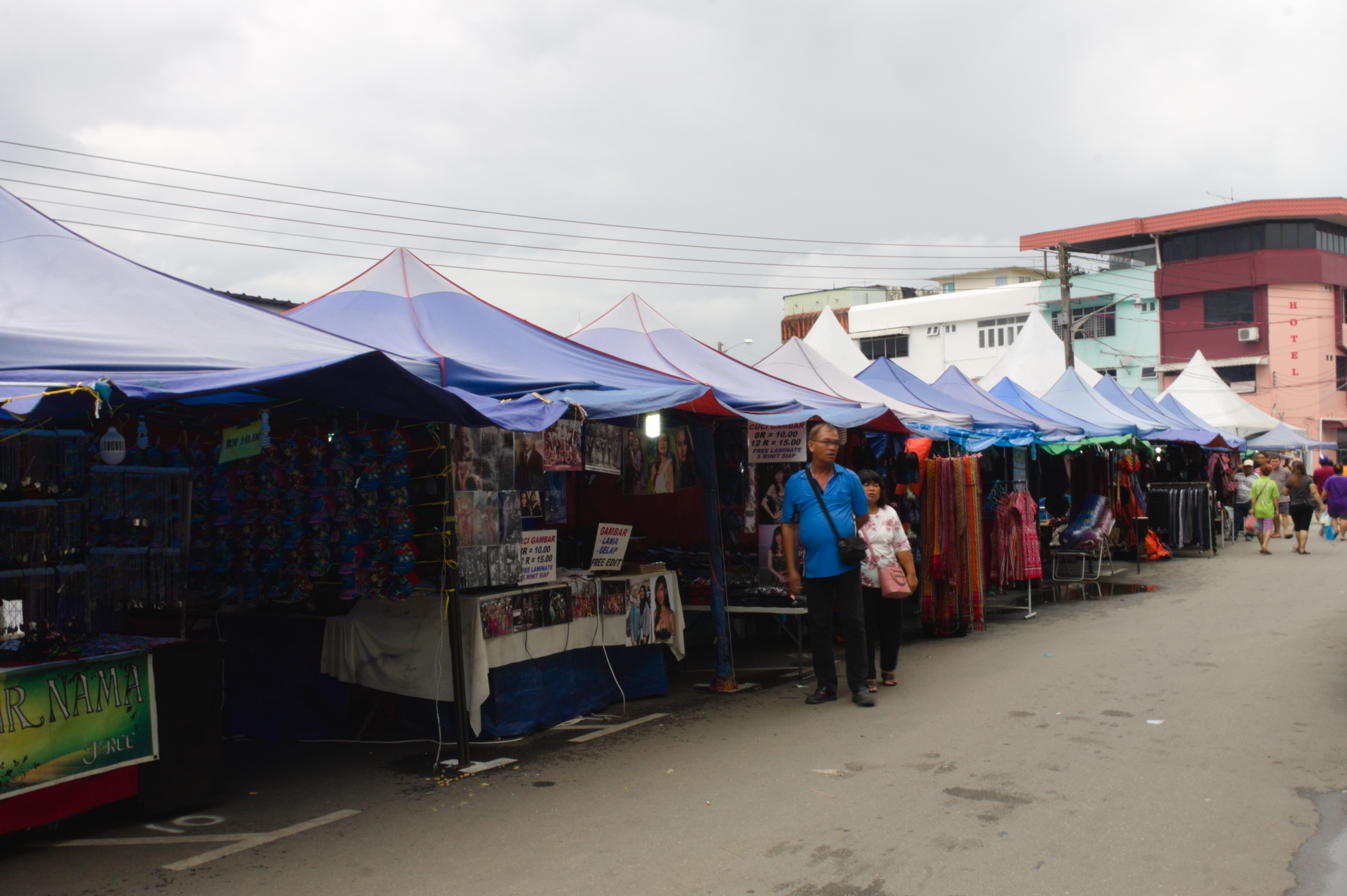
Stalls during the Kanowit festival in 2018

=== Attractions and recreational spots ===
The town center consists of three streets of 1930s vintage Chinese shophouses, near the waterfront. A few new shophouses have been built. Kanowit has a dry and wet market, offering local vegetables, meats and handicrafts. The market opens everyday from 7am till 12 noon. During periods of celebration, the local karaoke can often be heard from far away with the pounding basslines of 80s hits in English, Malay and Chinese.

The best sight seeing can be had by walking along the riverside from town or up the Telecom Hill or Bukit Memaluh Hill.
