= Julau =

- District

Other transcription(s)
  - Chinese: 如楼
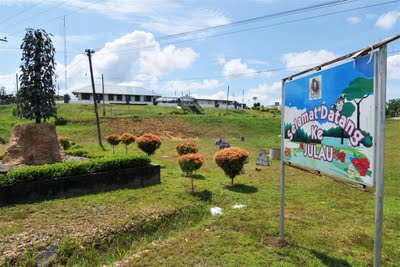
- At the junction just before entering Julau Town. Black Pepper statue is on the left side; symbolic of Julau as a Black Pepper District.
- Nickname: Black Pepper District
- Location within Malaysia
- Coordinates: 2°1′0″N 111°55′0″E
- Country: Malaysia
- State: Sarawak
- Division: Sarikei

Area
  - Total: 1,703.39 km^{2} (657.68 sq mi)

Population (2000)
  - Total: 34,500
- Time zone: UTC+8 (MST)
- Postal code: 96600
- National calling code: +6084734 (local landline only)
- Website: www.maradong-julaudc.sarawak.gov.my/

Julau is a town, and the capital of the Julau District (1703.39 square kilometres) in Sarikei Division, Sarawak, Malaysia. The district population (year 2020 census) is 15, 333. The population is dominated by Iban as well as Chinese especially the Fuzhou.

== History ==
In 1853, James Brooke was able to take over Rajang River and its surrounding settlements from the Brunei Sultanate. A person from Xiamen named Limah Din (林结麟) was the first Chinese to arrive in Julau in 1929. He settled near the mouth of the Julau river and started acres of rubber plantations. He then used his home to start a trade business with the natives in Julau. In memory of his role in opening up Julau, a road is now named after him as Limah Din road. (Note: Yii, 2010. Page 270) The Chinese started business activities in 1936 at the mouth of the Julau river between Julau and Nanga Meluan. In the same year, the Brooke government set up a fort at a hill in Meluan in order to defend itself from the Iban attacks led by Penghulu Asun. In 1938, the Brooke government formally put Julau under the jurisdiction of Ng Meluan. The trading of rubber sheets and Engkabang fruits (Shorea macrophylla) between the Iban and the Chinese was the major economic activity in Julau. (Note: Yii, 2010. Page 270)

During the Japanese occupation of Sarawak, there were some Iban people who took advantage of the power vacuum and went downriver and perform raiding activities. Therefore, the Chinese in Julau decided to cooperate with other more friendly Ibans to start patrolling and protecting the people. Besides, several Ibans decided to let the Chinese to open up their lands for the cultivation of rice, corn, and tobacco. (Note: Yii, 2010. Page 271-272) In 1953, the Bao Hua cinema (宝华戏院) was opened. However, in 1980s, due to the wide of availability of television sets, the cinema was closed down. In 1954, there were 22 shophouses in Julau. However, in 1965, all the shophouses were burnt down in a fire; while the land where the shophouses were built are left abandoned today. In 1955, a hospital, a telephone department, and a village council was set up. In 1957, a dormitory for the civil servants was built. (Note: Yii, 2010. Page 272) In 1957, the first row of five concrete shophouses were built. In the same year, the Julau village council started to install power station, electrical wires, and light bulbs, replacing oil lamps. (Note: Yii, 2010. Page 273) Motorboat companies were set up to connect Julau with other towns along the Rajang River such as Machan, Kanowit, and Sibu. (Note: Yii, 2010. Page 273) In 1960, Julau businessmen started a pipe water project where river water was pumped into shophouses and homes. The water project was later taken over by the government water board. (Note: Yii, 2010. Page 275)

In 1963, Malaysia was formed. Road conditions were improved. This significantly shorten the travelling time from Julau to Sarikei and Sibu. In 1970s, Julau bridge was built. Motorboat companies have to close down their businesses due to reducing number of customers. (Note: Yii, 2010. Page 274) In 1967, the first government secondary school in Julau was set up. Students from other rural areas such as Entabai, Pakan, and Meluan came to study here. In 1970s, Julau water board, telephone department, agriculture department and police department were built. (Note: Yii, 2010. Page 275) Previously, Julau was a sub-district under the jurisdiction of Kanowit District. In 1973, Julau was upgraded into a district and is put under the administration of Sarikei Division.

== Government ==
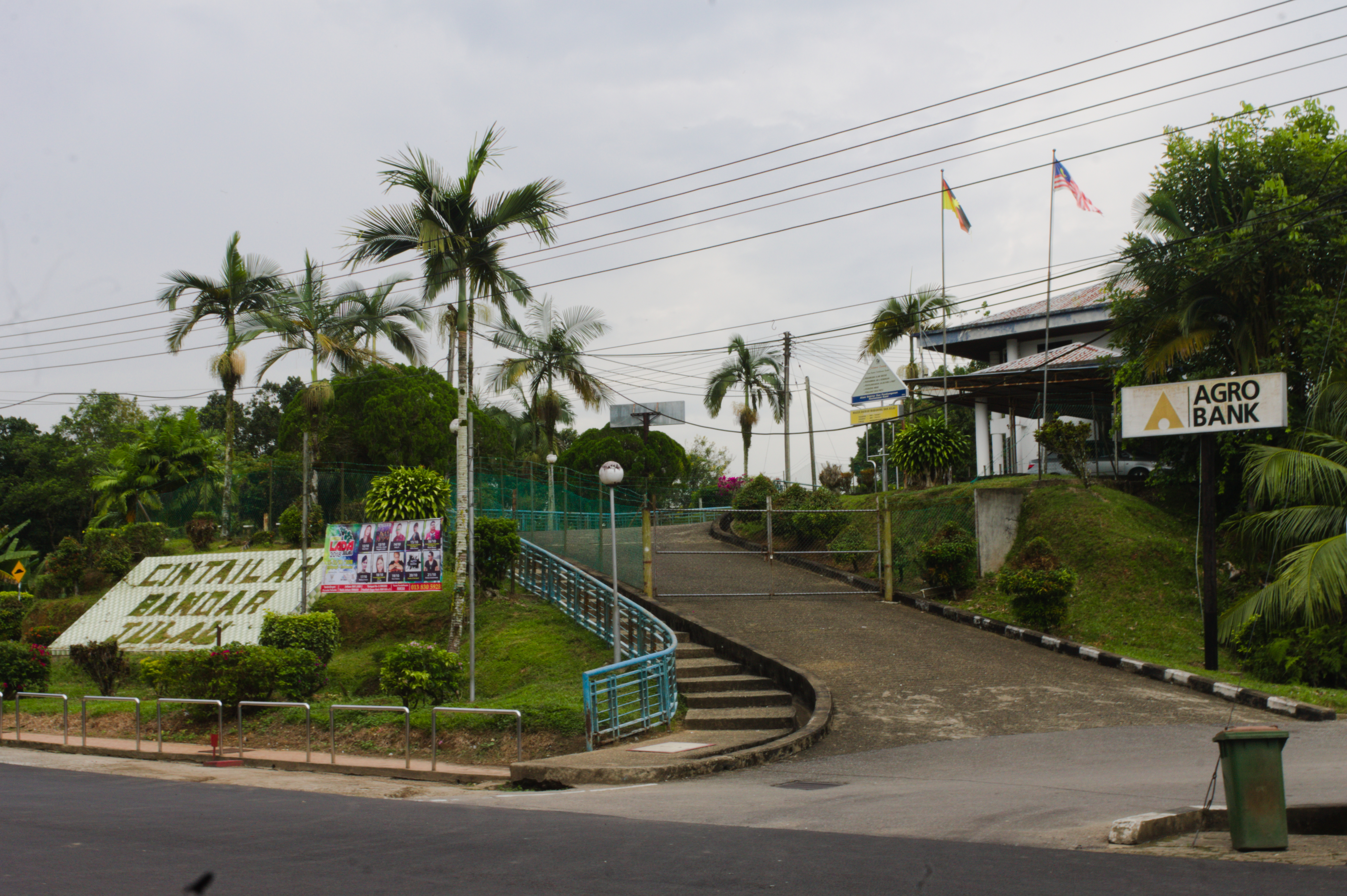
Meradong and Julau District Council, Julau branch

- Julau District Office
- Julau Sub-District Education Department
- Julau District Agriculture Department
- Julau District Police Station
- Julau District Health Department
- Julau District Public Works Department
- Julau District Information Department
- Meradong-Julau District Council
- Julau District National Registration Department
- Julau District Social Welfare Department
- Julau Cooperative Development Department
- Julau District KEMAS Office
- Julau District Post Office
- Julau District RELA Office
- Julau District SESCO
- Julau District Telekom Malaysia

== Geography ==
Julau is located at the intersection of Kanowit and Julau rivers. (Note: Yii, 2010. Page 270) Julau is located at 66 km from Sarikei town, 48 km from Bintangor, 39 km from Kanowit, and 60 km from Sibu. Floods happen in the Julau district in January 1968, January 1989, December 1993, January 2003, December 2011, and March 2021.

=== Climate ===
Julau has a tropical rainforest climate (Af) with heavy to very heavy rainfall year-round.

Climate data for Julau
Month	Jan	Feb	Mar	Apr	May	Jun	Jul	Aug	Sep	Oct	Nov	Dec	Year
Mean daily maximum °C (°F)	30.2 (86.4)	30.5 (86.9)	31.4 (88.5)	32.0 (89.6)	32.4 (90.3)	32.2 (90.0)	32.1 (89.8)	31.8 (89.2)	31.7 (89.1)	31.6 (88.9)	31.4 (88.5)	30.9 (87.6)	31.5 (88.7)
Daily mean °C (°F)	26.2 (79.2)	26.4 (79.5)	27.0 (80.6)	27.3 (81.1)	27.6 (81.7)	27.3 (81.1)	27.1 (80.8)	27.0 (80.6)	27.0 (80.6)	27.0 (80.6)	26.9 (80.4)	26.6 (79.9)	27.0 (80.5)
Mean daily minimum °C (°F)	22.2 (72.0)	22.3 (72.1)	22.6 (72.7)	22.6 (72.7)	22.9 (73.2)	22.5 (72.5)	22.1 (71.8)	22.2 (72.0)	22.3 (72.1)	22.4 (72.3)	22.4 (72.3)	22.3 (72.1)	22.4 (72.3)
Average rainfall mm (inches)	341 (13.4)	280 (11.0)	303 (11.9)	255 (10.0)	262 (10.3)	203 (8.0)	177 (7.0)	234 (9.2)	298 (11.7)	280 (11.0)	287 (11.3)	357 (14.1)	3,277 (128.9)
Source: Climate-Data.org

== Demographics ==
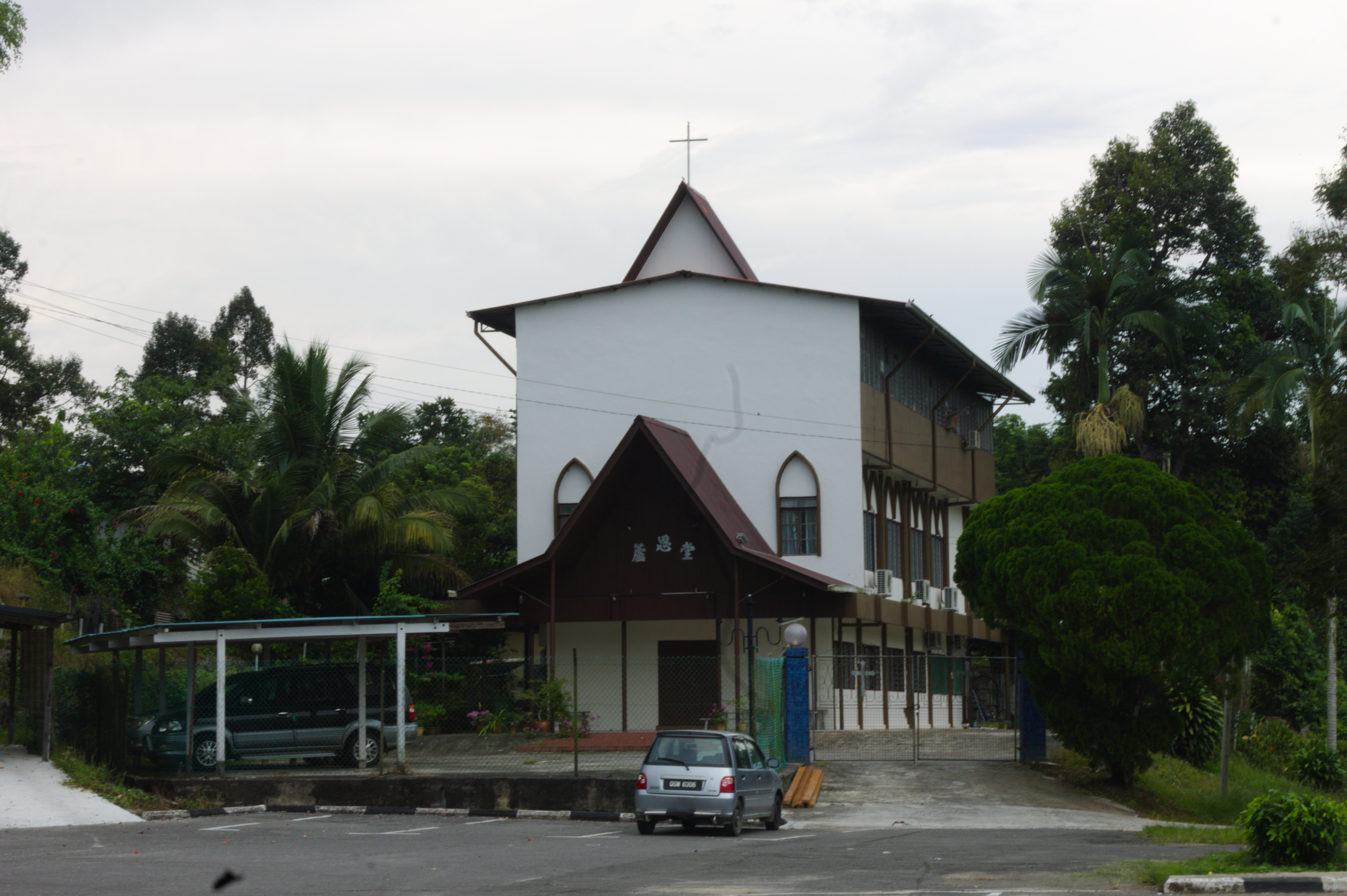
Julau Methodist church

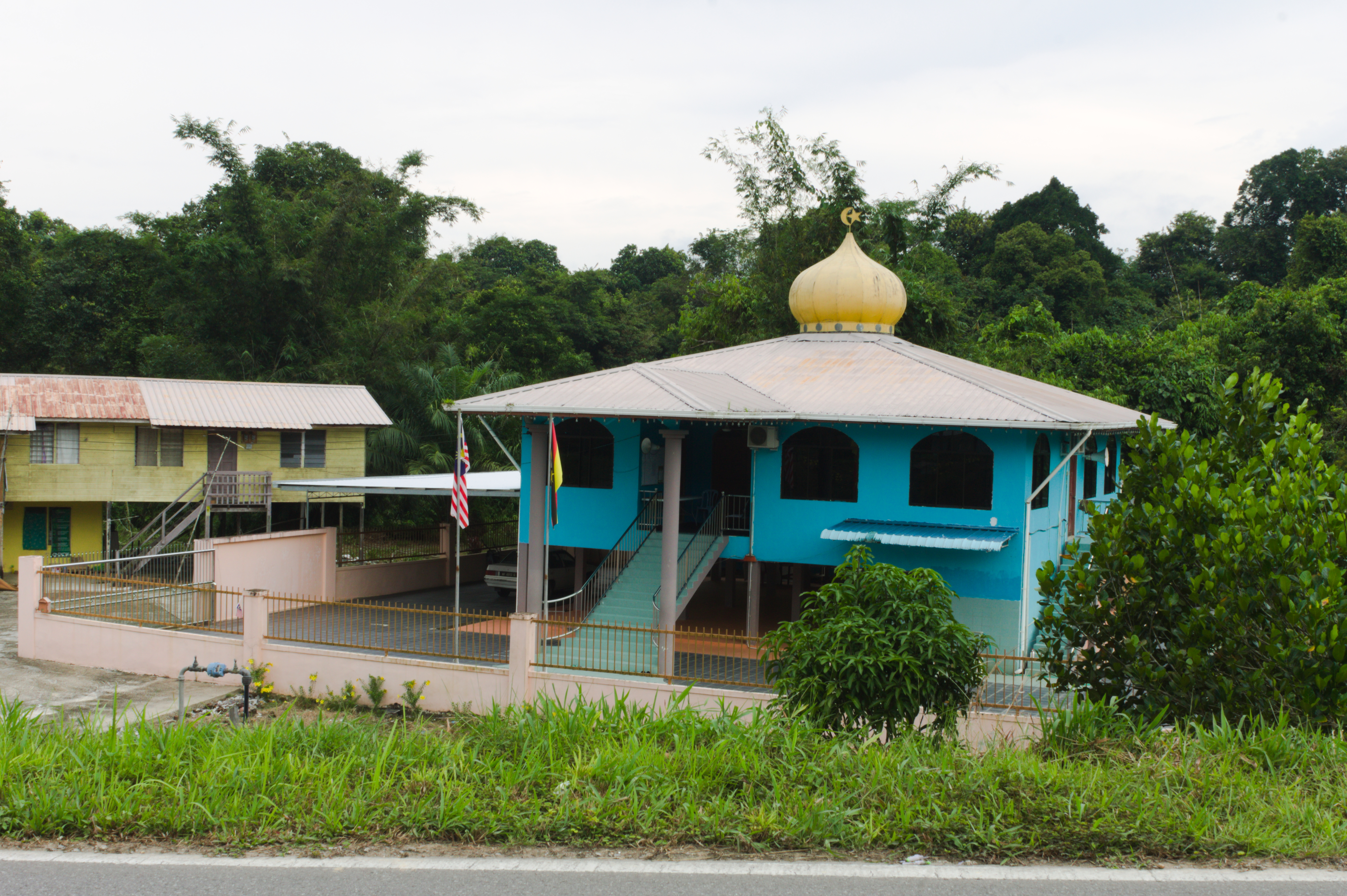
Nurul Hidayah mosque

The first Christian missionary in Julau was spread by Liu Yang Xin (刘杨馨) in 1946 when she completed her studies at Singapore Nanyang Girls' High School. She started a Sunday school during her free time. However, the Sunday school stopped operating when she was transferred back to Singapore Nanyang Nanyang Girls' High School in the end of the same year. After that, intermittent Christian missionaries were sent here from 1948 to 1950. Only in 1958, a permanent Christian missionary was tasked to visit Julau once or twice a month to host Sunday worship services. In 1971, Julau Methodist Church was established. A Methodist kinder-garden was established in 1988. (Note: Yii, 2010. Page 280, 281)

=== Place of Worship ===
Christian

- Julau St. Alphonsus Catholic Church
- Julau Methodist Church
- Julau Centre Seventh-day Adventist Church
- Nanga Luau Seventh-day Adventist Church
- Nanga Ejit Seventh-day Adventist Church
- Nanga Ayam Seventh-day Adventist Church
- Nanga Lijan Seventh-day Adventist Church
- Nanga Merurun Seventh-day Adventist Church
- Nanga Udur Seventh-day Adventist Church
- Nanga Rayah Seventh-day Adventist Church

Muslim

- Nurul Hidayah Mosque

== Economy ==
Major economic activities in Julau are: black pepper, rubber, rice, and fruits farming. Other economic activities include: retail, logging, and services. Julau is better known for its black pepper production.

== Transport ==
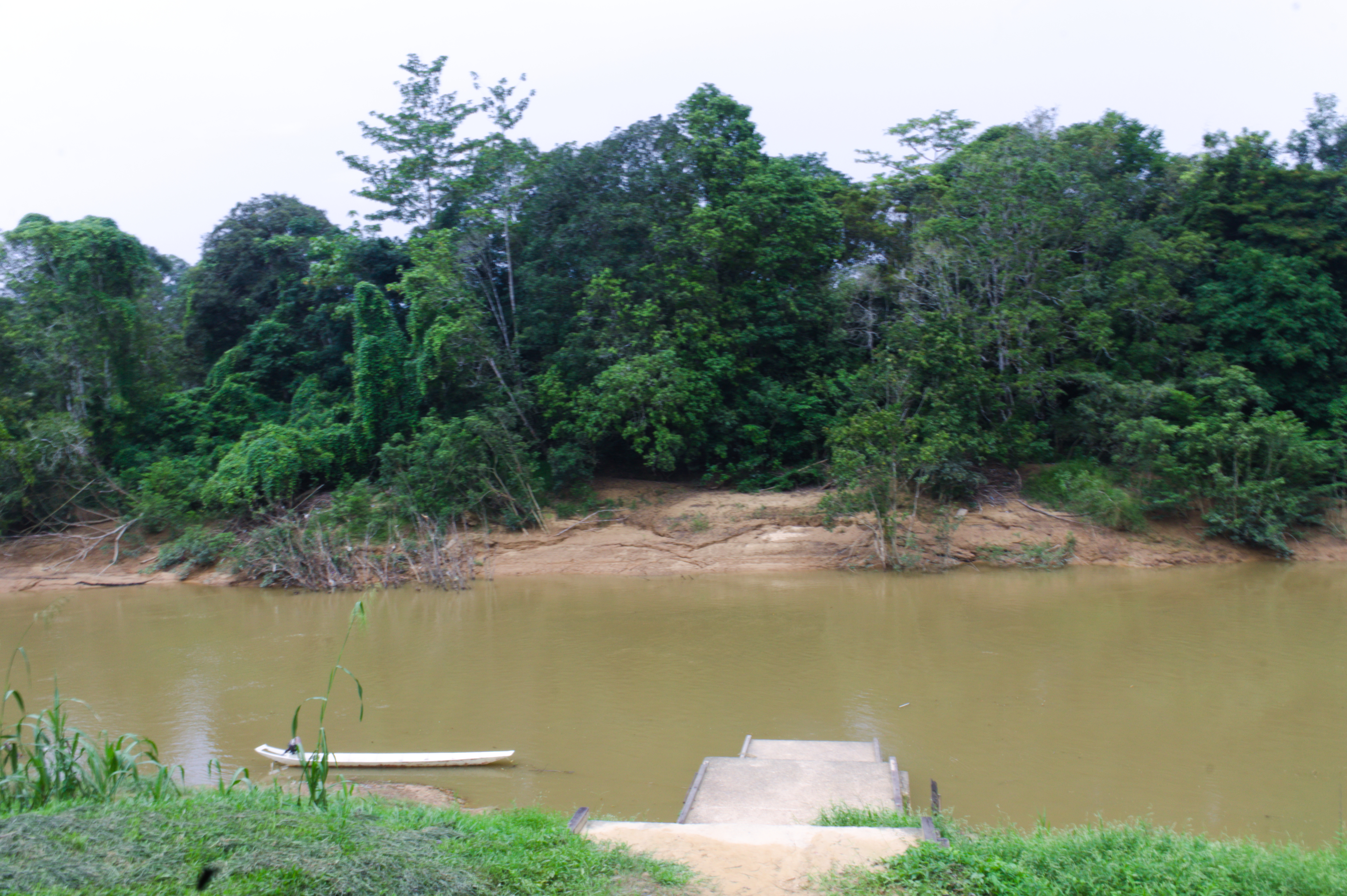
View of Julau river from the jetty.

For people from rural areas, their major mode of transport to Julau is plying through the rivers.

Land

Public Bus

- Borneo Almagated Sdn. Bhd

Personal Vehicles

- Today, most of Julau people have their own personal transportation, such as car, motorcycle and van to travel to their destination.

Water

There are many remote places in Julau that have not reachable yet with land transportation and boat is the only solution for them to go there.

== Other utilities ==
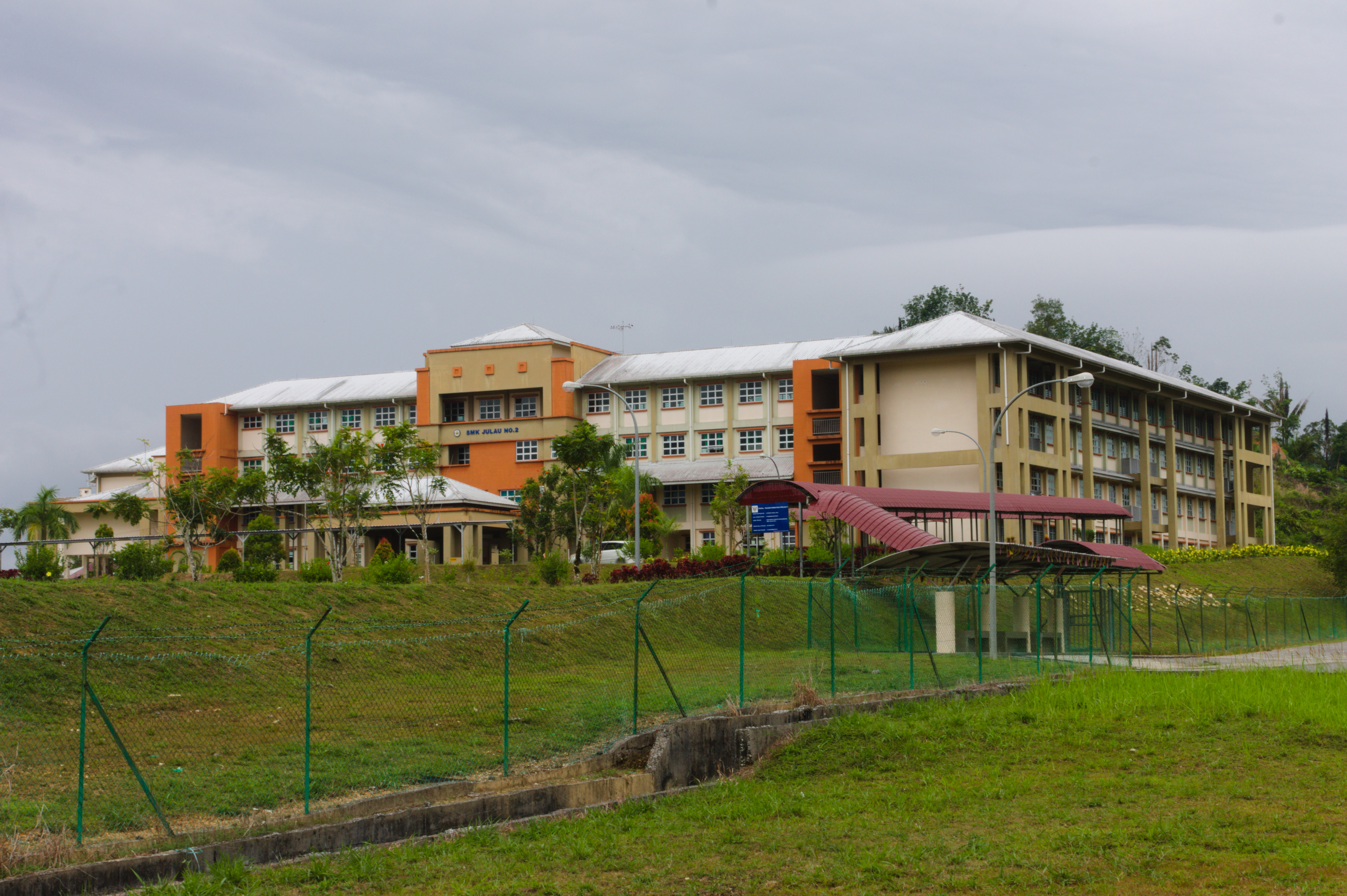
SMK Julau No. 2

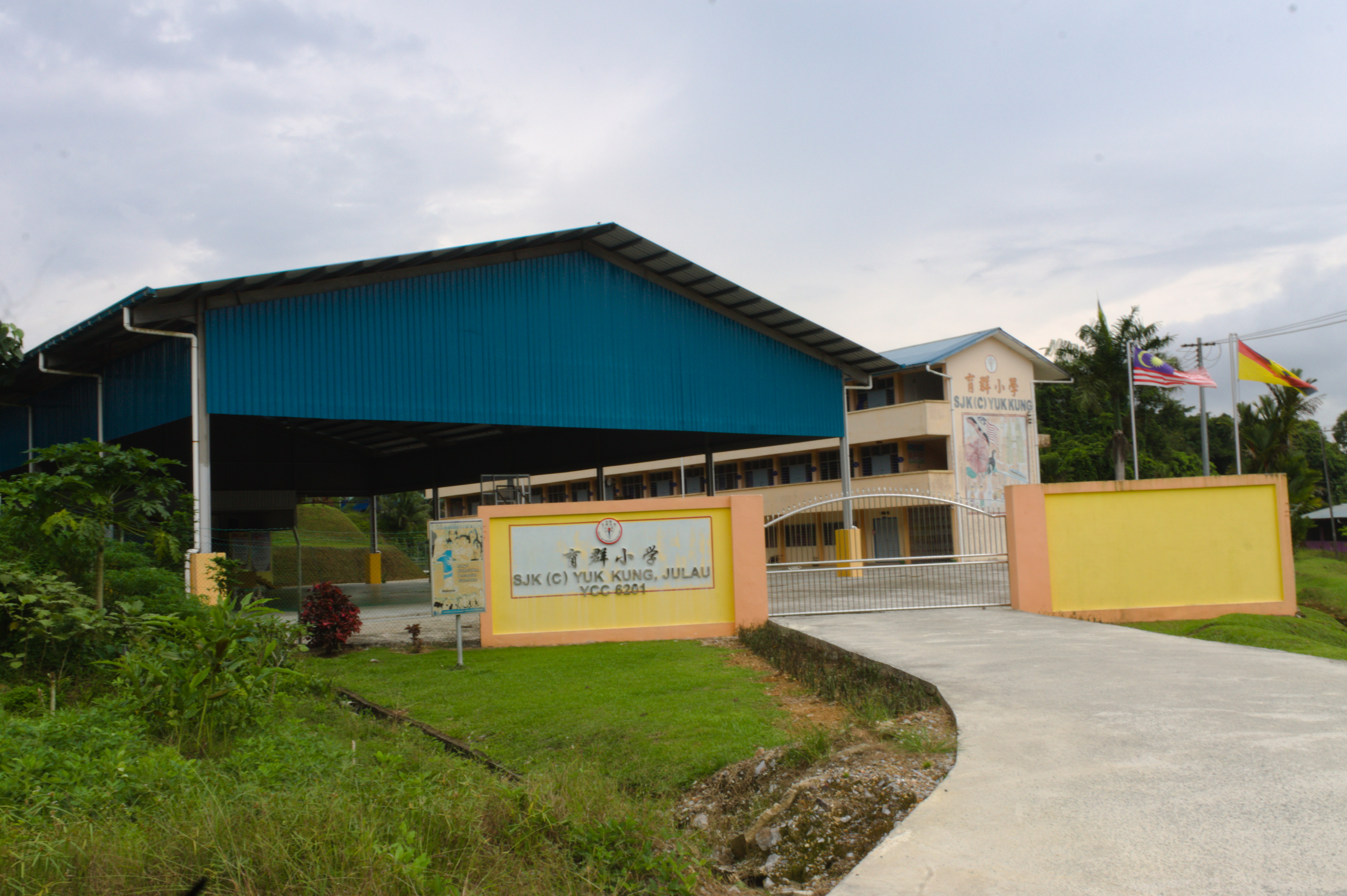
SJK(C) Yuk Kung

=== Education ===
The first primary school in Julau was set up in 1946, named Wen Ming primary school (文明学校). It was hosted inside a catholic church. In 1950, the school was migrated into a new shophouse. In 1951, a formal school building was completed. All the pupils from Wen Ming primary school were migrated into the new school building. At the same time, the school was renamed Yuk Kung primary school. In 1956, the school formally accepted subsidies from the Sarawak government. (Note: Yii, 2010. Page 282,283)

Pre-School

- Nanga Julau KEMAS Kindergarten
- Nanga Boa KEMAS Kindergarten
- Ejit KEMAS Kindergarten
- Bilat KEMAS Kindergarten
- Meluan KEMAS Kindergarten
- Entabai KEMAS Kindergarten
- Methodist Kindergarten

Primary School

The first school was started by Christian Missionaries. After the World War II, a Mission School called Roman Catholic Mission opened publicly in the 1930s. This school is the original of today's Julau St. Alphonsus Primary School or SK St. Alphonsus Julau (Primary School is also known as Sekolah Kebangsaan, SK). In 1951, Julau's Chinese also want to start their own school which then called Julau Yuk Kung Chinese National-type School or SJK (C) Yuk Kung Julau (Chinese National-type School is also known asSekolah Jenis Kebangsaan Cina, SJK(C)). The following years shows more primary schools are built, they are:

- Nanga Luau Primary School
- Nanga Merurun Primary School
- Kelangas Primary School
- Nanga Meluan Primary School
- Nanga Entabai Primary School
- Lubuk Assam Primary School
- Tapang Punggu Primary School
- Nanga Maong Primary School
- Nanga Ju Primary School
- Nanga Ensiring Primary School
- Nanga Jambu Primary School
- Nanga Serau Primary School
- Nanga Lasi Primary School

Secondary School

- Julau National High School or Sekolah Menengah Kebangsaan Julau (SMK Julau)

In 1966, SMK Julau started its operation in SK St. Alphonsus with only two classrooms. In 1970, SMK Julau moved to a new site which is the current site, Lembah Hilir Sungai Julau. The site was once belonged to Datuk Temenggong Banyang Anak Janting before he sold it to The State Government in 1968. On 22 March 1973, SMK Julau was officially launched by Yang Berhormat Tun Hussien Onn who was the Education Minister at the time.

In 2026 SMK Julau now provides sixth form of secondary education, referred to as "Form 6". Students from Julau who want to continue their study in Form 6 to get a STPM's can now go to SMK Julau instead of going to SMK Meradong

- Sekolah Menengah Kebangsaan Julau No.2

SMK Julau No.2 was built to support the need of Julau people in education especially for those who come from rural area.

=== Healthcare ===
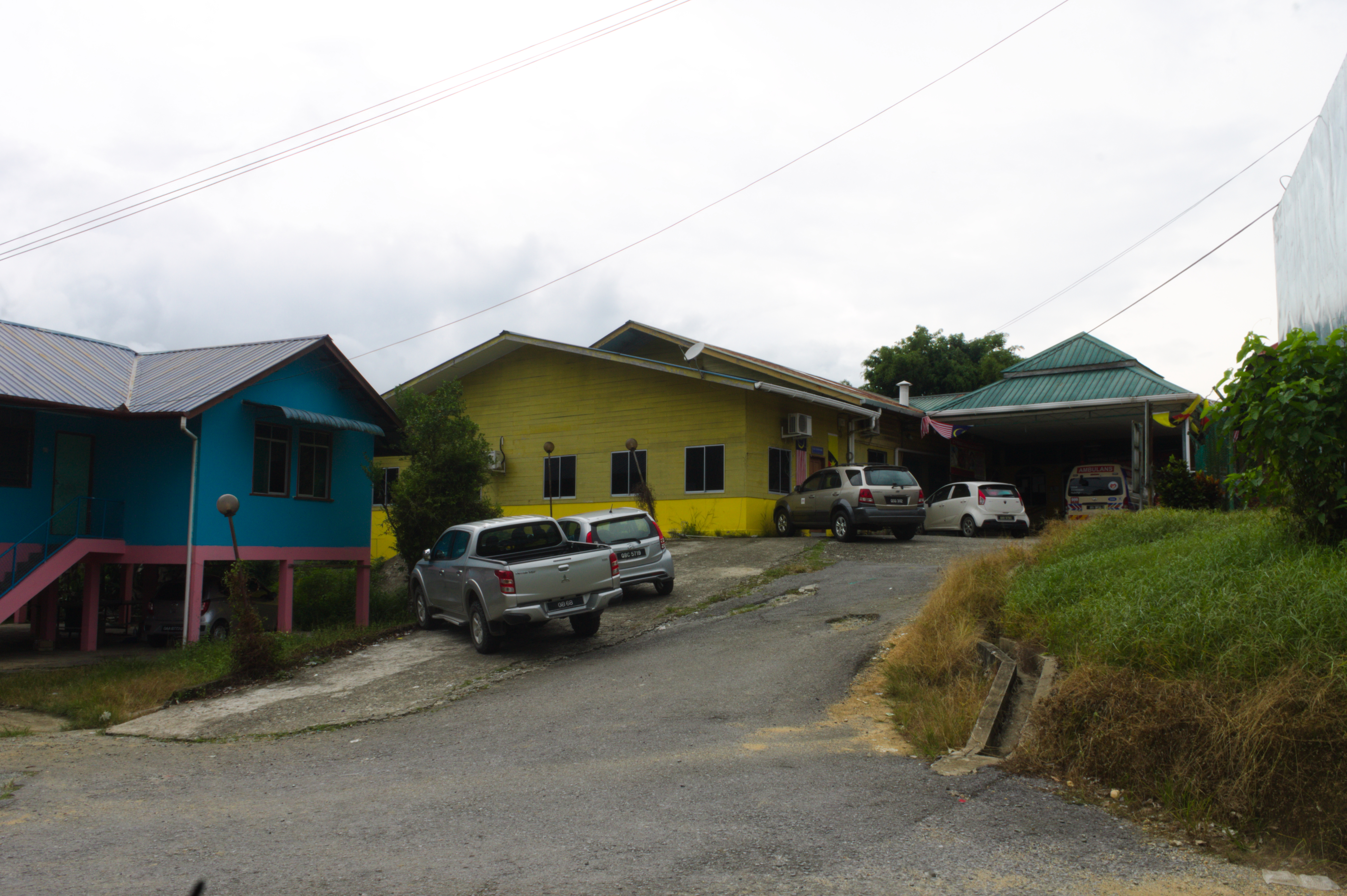
Julau health clinic

Clinic

- Julau Health Clinic

Before a clinic was built, Julau people need to go to the nearest clinic available, especially in Kanowit & Sarikei to get their medical needs. Currently, there is only one clinic established in Julau.

== Culture and leisure ==
=== Attractions and recreational spots ===
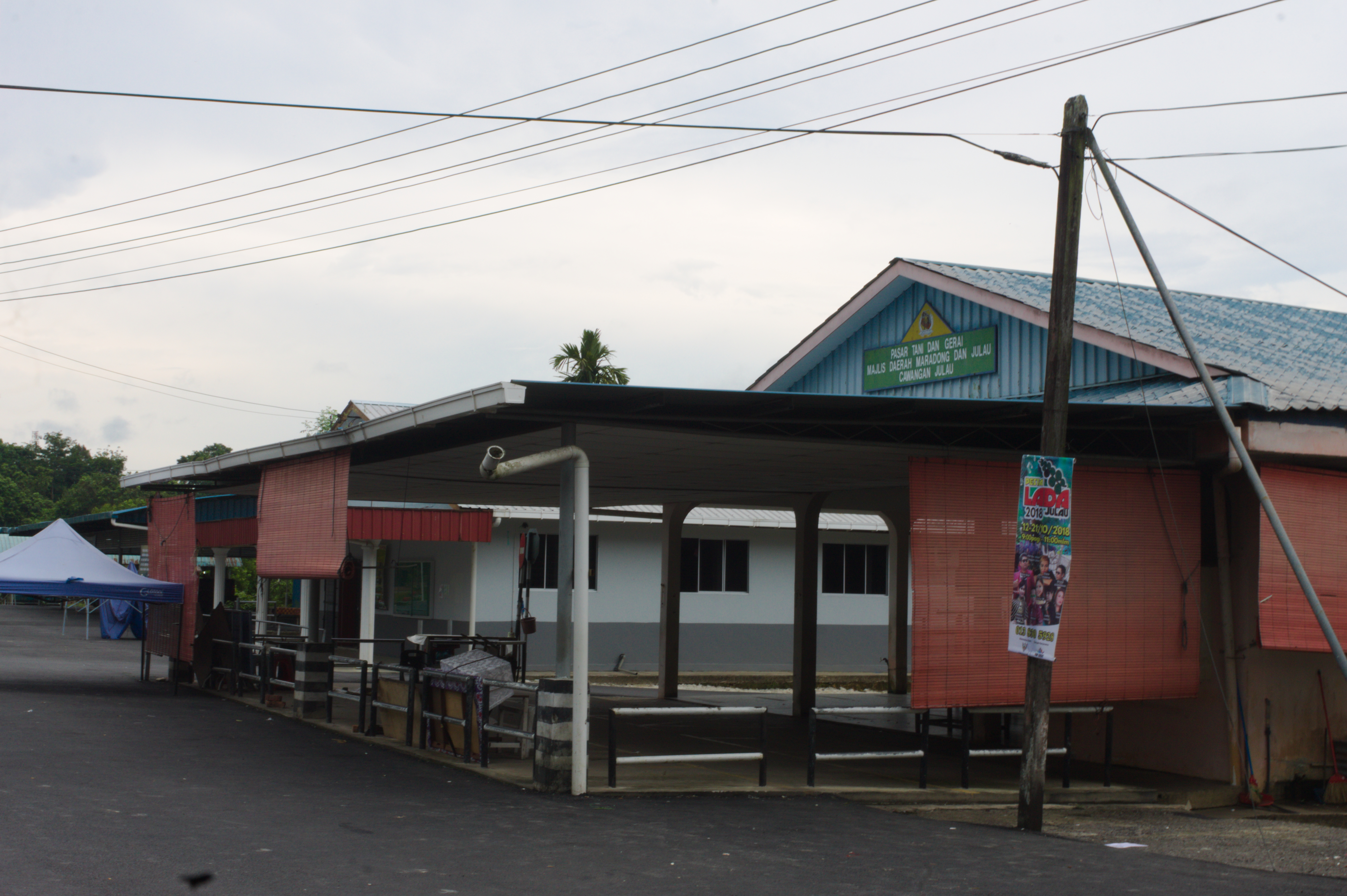
The Julau market

There is a weekly Sunday market in Julau where people will gather here to sell a variety of agricultural products. Fort Brooke is located at Nanga Meluan, 24 km away from Julau Town. The Fort was built by the Brooke government to hinder the attacks by Ibans.
