= Joseph Hii Teck Kwong =

Malaysian prelate

His Excellency, The Most Reverend Joseph Hii Teck Kwong
- Bishop of Sibu
- Church: Roman Catholic Church
- Diocese: Sibu
- Appointed: 24 December 2011
- Installed: 15 February 2012
- Predecessor: Dominic Su Haw Chiu
- Previous post: Auxiliary Bishop of Sibu (2008-2012)

Orders
- Ordination: 25 March 1993 by Dominic Su Haw Chiu
- Consecration: 1 May 2008 by Salvatore Pennacchio

Personal details
- Born: 25 June 1965 (age 61) Sibu, Sarawak, Malaysia
- Education: Pontifical Theological Faculty Teresianum
- Motto: Ecclesia christi sponsa (English: Church, bride of Christ)

Styles of Joseph Hii Teck Kwong
- Reference style: His Excellency; The Most Reverend
- Spoken style: Your Excellency
- Religious style: Bishop

Joseph Hii Teck Kwong
- Traditional Chinese: 許德光
- Simplified Chinese: 许德光
- Hanyu Pinyin: Xǔ Déguāng
- Pha̍k-fa-sṳ: Hí Tet-kông

Joseph Hii Teck Kwong (born 25 June 1965) is a Malaysian prelate of the Roman Catholic Church who has been serving as bishop of the Diocese of Sibu since 2012. He served as an auxiliary bishop of the same diocese from 2008 to 2012.

== Biography ==
=== Early life ===
Hii entered St. Peter's major seminary in Kuching, Sarawak, in 1986, to study philosophy and theology.

=== Priesthood ===
Hii was ordained a priest on 25 March 1993 at Sacred Heart Cathedral, Sibu. In 1999, he obtained a licentiate in spiritual theology from the Pontifical Theological Faculty Teresianum in Rome, Italy.

== Auxiliary Bishop of Sibu ==
At the age of 43, Hii was appointed titular bishop of Castellum Medianum and auxiliary bishop of the Diocese of Sibu on 25 January 2008, by Pope Benedict XVI. He received his episcopal consecration on 1 May 2008, from Archbishop Salvatore Pennacchio. Bishop Dominic Su Haw Chiu and Archbishop John Ha Tiong Hock served as co-consecrators.

== Bishop of Sibu ==
On 24 December 2011, Pope Benedict XVI accepted the resignation of Bishop Dominic Su Haw Chiu of Diocese of Sibu and named Hii to succeed him. Hii was installed as the second bishop of the Diocese of Sibu by his predecessor on 15 February 2012, at the Sacred Heart Cathedral in Sibu.

Catholic Church titles
Preceded by Stefan Regmunt	Roman Catholic Titular See of Castellum Medianum; 2008–2012	Succeeded by Roque Costa Souza
Preceded by –	Auxiliary Bishop of Sibu; 2008–2012	Succeeded by –
Preceded by Dominic Su Haw Chiu	Bishop of Sibu; 2012–present	Incumbent
