= Bintangor =

Bintangor may refer to:

- Bintangor, hardwood trees of the genus Calophyllum; also, their termite-resistant hardwood
- Bintangor, Sarawak, a town in Sarawak, island of Borneo, Malaysia
- Bintangor River, a river in Sarawak, island of Borneo, Malaysia
