= Sibu District =

Administrative district in Sarawak, Malaysia

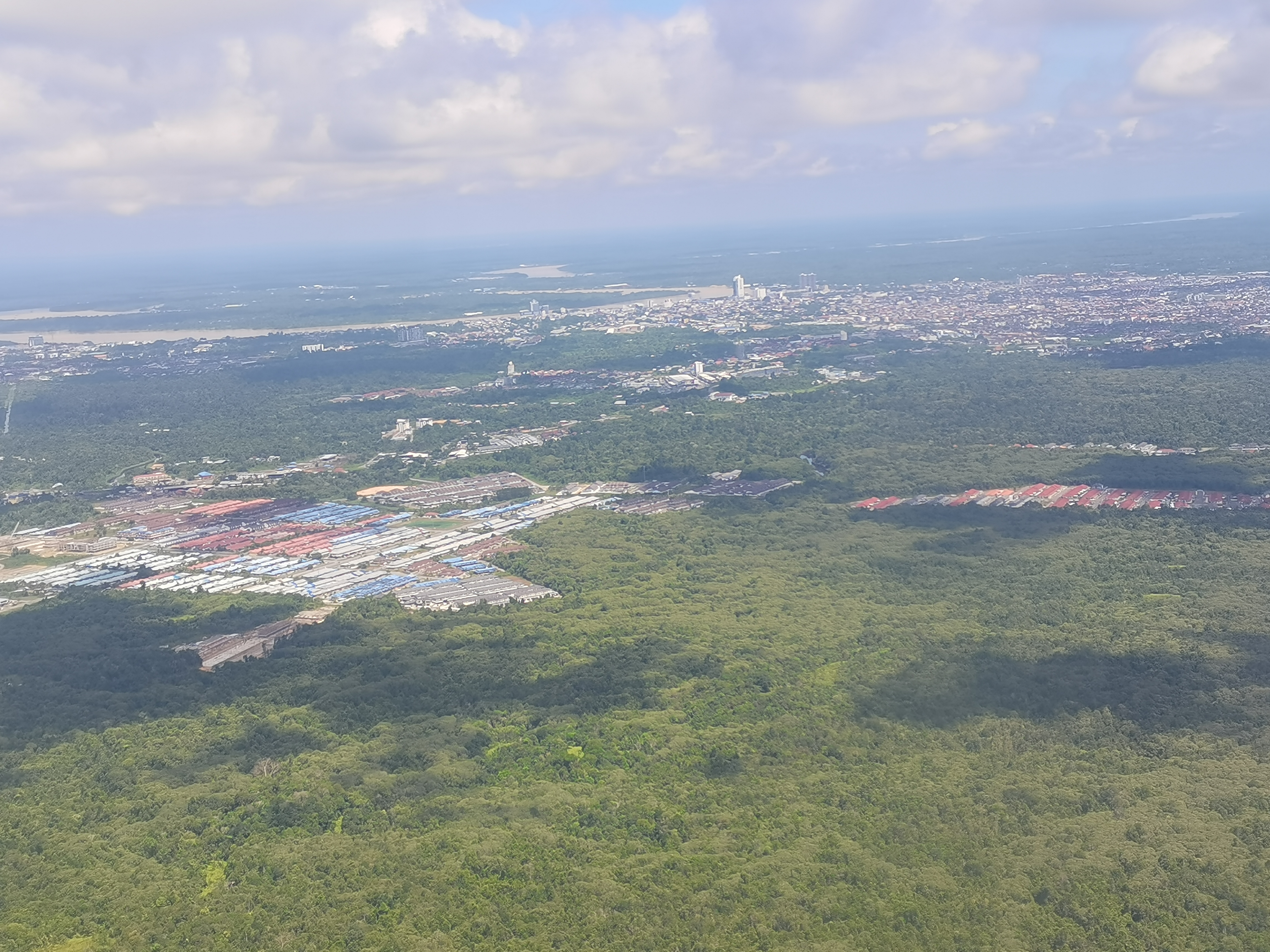
- Sibu District view from above the Permai Jaya housing estate.

- Districts of Sarawak

- District Office location: Sibu
- Local area government(s): Sibu Municipal Council (SMC); Sibu Rural District Council (SRDC)

Area
  - Total: 2,229.8 km^{2} (860.9 sq mi)

Population (2024)
  - Total: 465,163
  - Density: 208.61/km^{2} (540.30/sq mi)
- Chairman: Clarence Ting Ing Horh (SMC); Sempurai anak Petrus Ngelai (SRDC)
- License plate prefix: QS
- Ethnicity: Chinese (44.9%); Iban (29.8%); Malay (20.6%); Melanau (1.9%)
- Website: https://smc.gov.my/web/home/

Sibu District is an administrative district in Sibu Division, Sarawak, Malaysia covering a total area of 2229.8 km^{2}. It can be divided into Sibu Town area (129.5 km^{2}) and the rural areas (2,100.3 km^{2}). The satellite township of Sibu Jaya (26 km away from the Sibu city) is included in the rural areas. Sibu District is under the purview of Sibu District Office located at Sibu Islamic Complex, Sibu City. There are currently two local authorities namely Sibu Municipal Council (SMC) and Sibu Rural District Council (SRDC) that administers Sibu City and Sibu rural areas respectively.

== Demographics ==
There has been a marginal growth of Sibu District population of 2.36% from 1991 to 2000. Meanwhile, from 2000 to 2010, there is a marginal growth of 1.53%.

=== Ethnicity ===
Ethnic composition of Sibu District (2024)
| Ethnicities / Nationality | Percentage |
| Malays | 20.61% |
| Iban | 29.83% |
| Bidayuh | 1% |
| Melanau | 1.92% |
| Other Bumiputeras | 1.21% |
| Chinese | 44.92% |
| Indians | 0.02% |
| Others | 0% |
| Non-Malaysian | 0.49% |

| Ethnicity | 2024 | |
| Ethnicity | Pop. | % |
|---|---|---|
| Malays | 95890 | 20.61% |
| Iban | 138768 | 29.83% |
| Bidayuh | 4635 | 1% |
| Melanau | 8936 | 1.92% |
| Other Bumiputeras | 5610 | 1.21% |
| Chinese | 208953 | 44.92% |
| Indians | 91 | 0.02% |
| Others | 0 | 0% |
| Malaysian total | 462883 | 99.51% |
| Non-Malaysian | 2280 | 0.49% |
| Total | 465163 | 100.00% |

Historical population
| Year | Pop. | ±% |
|---|---|---|
| 1975 | 80,375 | — |
| 1980 | 98,954 | +23.1% |
| 1985 | 120,763 | +22.0% |
| 1990 | 151,932 | +25.8% |
| 1995 | 190,368 | +25.3% |
| 2004 | 229,582 | +20.6% |
| 2010 | 301,584 | +31.4% |
| 2015 | 364,895 | +21.0% |
| 2024 | 465,163 | +27.5% |

== City and towns ==
=== Sibu ===
James Brooke built a fort in Sibu in 1862. In 1901, 1,118 Fuzhounese settlers migrated to Sibu. Today, Sibu is the largest city by the Rajang River.

=== Sibu Jaya ===
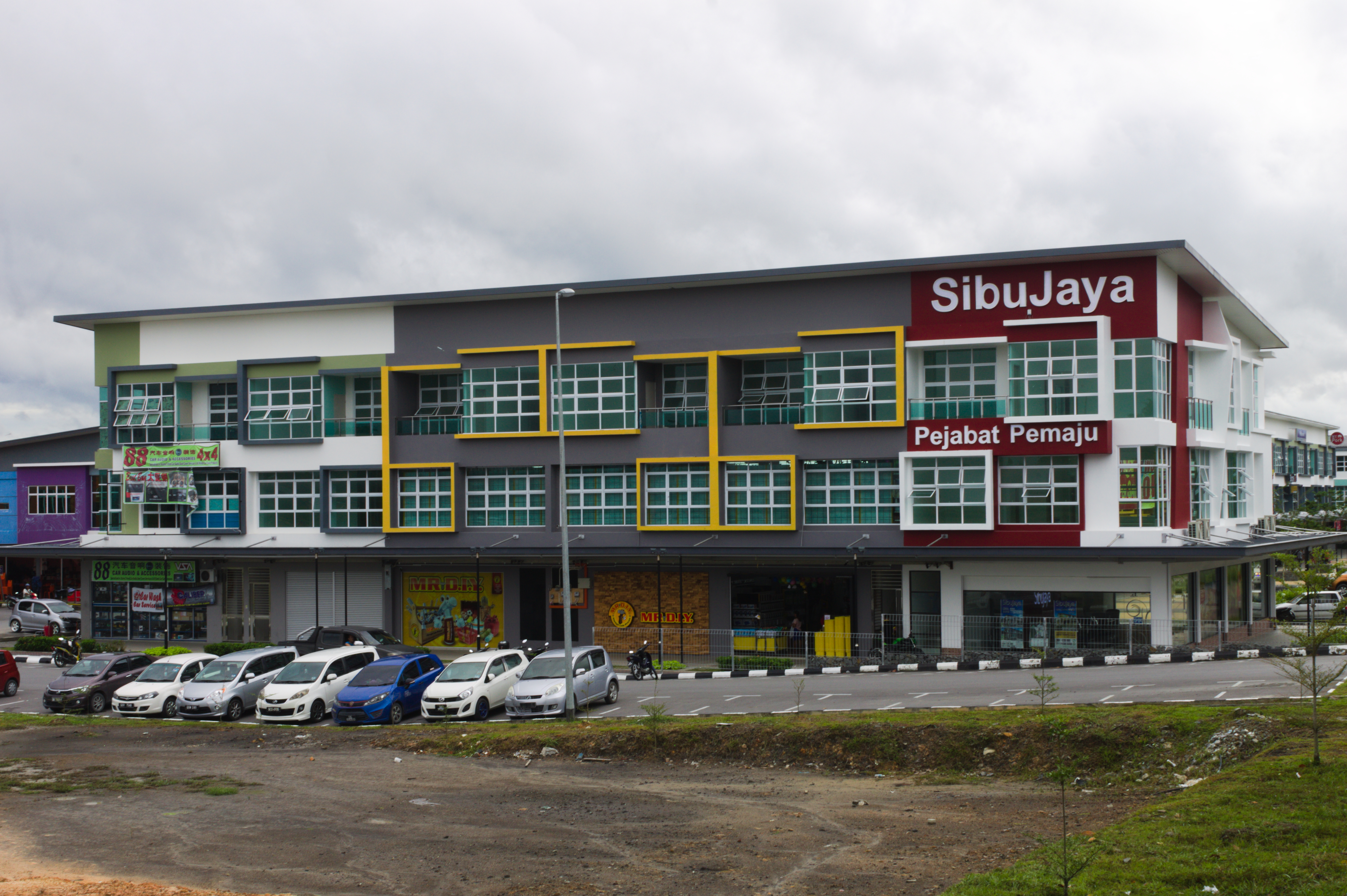
Sibu Jaya developer office

Sibu Jaya is located at 26 km away from Sibu. and 1 km away from Sibu Airport. It is a joint development project between AmCorp Corporation Sdn Bhd and Sarawak Housing and Development Corporation. It was developed as a satellite township to Sibu in 1995. The city is expected to be completed in 2023.

=== Durin ===
Pesta Rakyat Durin (Durin Peoples' festival) is held at Durin bazaar every year. Durin Bridge connecting the town of Sibu with Durin bazaar was opened in 2006.

=== Kemuyang ===
Kemuyang area is located 23 km away from the town of Sibu. Sibu Kemuyang Youth Camp started operation 1999. Sibu Pastoral Centre is also located here.

=== Rantau Panjang ===
Rantau Panjang Integrated Shipyard Shipbuilding Industrial Zone was constructed in 2003.

=== Pasai Siong ===
The largest Covid-19 cluster in Sarawak was detected here. The cluster lasted from December 2020 to April 2021, infecting a total of 2,693 people across ten other districts in Sarawak, resulting in 29 deaths.

== Climate ==
Climate data for Sibu (1991–2020 normals)
| Month | Jan | Feb | Mar | Apr | May | Jun | Jul | Aug | Sep | Oct | Nov | Dec | Year |
|---|---|---|---|---|---|---|---|---|---|---|---|---|---|
| Record high °C (°F) | 35.1 (95.2) | 35.0 (95.0) | 35.6 (96.1) | 35.7 (96.3) | 36.6 (97.9) | 36.6 (97.9) | 37.1 (98.8) | 36.6 (97.9) | 36.5 (97.7) | 36.2 (97.2) | 35.0 (95.0) | 35.3 (95.5) | 37.1 (98.8) |
| Mean daily maximum °C (°F) | 31.0 (87.8) | 31.4 (88.5) | 32.3 (90.1) | 32.8 (91.0) | 32.9 (91.2) | 32.7 (90.9) | 32.8 (91.0) | 32.8 (91.0) | 32.3 (90.1) | 32.1 (89.8) | 32.0 (89.6) | 31.5 (88.7) | 32.2 (90.0) |
| Daily mean °C (°F) | 26.0 (78.8) | 26.1 (79.0) | 26.6 (79.9) | 26.9 (80.4) | 27.2 (81.0) | 27.0 (80.6) | 26.9 (80.4) | 26.9 (80.4) | 26.6 (79.9) | 26.4 (79.5) | 26.4 (79.5) | 26.2 (79.2) | 26.6 (79.9) |
| Mean daily minimum °C (°F) | 23.2 (73.8) | 23.2 (73.8) | 23.4 (74.1) | 23.6 (74.5) | 23.8 (74.8) | 23.6 (74.5) | 23.3 (73.9) | 23.3 (73.9) | 23.2 (73.8) | 23.3 (73.9) | 23.3 (73.9) | 23.3 (73.9) | 23.4 (74.1) |
| Record low °C (°F) | 18.5 (65.3) | 19.5 (67.1) | 20.0 (68.0) | 21.5 (70.7) | 21.6 (70.9) | 21.0 (69.8) | 20.5 (68.9) | 20.2 (68.4) | 20.9 (69.6) | 20.8 (69.4) | 21.4 (70.5) | 21.0 (69.8) | 18.5 (65.3) |
| Average precipitation mm (inches) | 440.2 (17.33) | 337.3 (13.28) | 336.1 (13.23) | 292.8 (11.53) | 242.7 (9.56) | 219.6 (8.65) | 179.5 (7.07) | 222.4 (8.76) | 230.5 (9.07) | 276.2 (10.87) | 362.2 (14.26) | 417.8 (16.45) | 3,557.2 (140.05) |
| Average precipitation days (≥ 1.0 mm) | 20.7 | 15.6 | 16.4 | 16.4 | 15.5 | 13.0 | 11.8 | 13.0 | 14.8 | 18.3 | 20.1 | 21.1 | 196.7 |
| Average relative humidity (%) | 86 | 85 | 86 | 84 | 85 | 83 | 82 | 84 | 84 | 85 | 84 | 87 | 84 |
| Mean monthly sunshine hours | 133 | 132 | 152 | 175 | 190 | 183 | 198 | 176 | 145 | 163 | 162 | 149 | 1,958 |
| Mean daily sunshine hours | 4.2 | 4.7 | 4.9 | 5.9 | 6.2 | 6.3 | 6.4 | 5.8 | 5.0 | 5.4 | 5.4 | 4.8 | 5.4 |
Source 1: World Meteorological Organization
Source 2: Deutscher Wetterdienst (extremes 1997-2003, humidity 1998–1999, daily sun 1971-1990), Ogimet
