= Borneo Cultural Festival =

Cultural event in Borneo

Borneo Cultural Festival Festival Kebudayaan Borneo
- Status: Active
- Genre: Cultural festivals
- Frequency: Annually
- Venue: Tun Tuanku Bujang Square (Sibu Town Square)
- Locations: Sibu, Sarawak
- Country: Malaysia
- Years active: 2002–2019, 2022–present
- Inaugurated: 2002
- Previous event: 5-14 September 2026
- Next event: TBA
- Participants: Dayak, Malay, Chinese, Melanau, and Bumiputera ethnic groups
- Organiser: Sibu Municipal Council (SMC)
- Website: Official Facebook page

Borneo Cultural Festival, abbreviated as BCF, is an annual festival of food, music, and dance that places a focus on cultural diversity of Borneo. The festival is held in Sibu, one of the major towns in the state of Sarawak, Malaysia, and was first organised in 2002. The festival regularly takes place in July, and is organised by the Sibu Municipal Council (SMC).

== History ==
BCF was originally known as Pesta Sibu before going through several name changes, such as Millennium Celebration and Borneo Tribal Extravaganza. Since 2005, BCF is held by Sibu Municipal Council (SMC) in July every year at Sibu Town Square, for a period of 10 days. It is a celebration of traditional music, dances, contests, beauty pageant, food stalls, fun fairs, and product exhibitions. There are 3 separate stages for Iban, Chinese, and Malay performances. It draws around 20,000 people every year. Besides cultural performances, Kumang Borneo Dayak Cultural Festival- a traditional beauty pageant- are held at the Dayak stage of BCF. Beginning 2023 edition, an International Night will be added on top of three traditional signature nights, namely Chinese Night, Malay/Melanau Night and Dayak Night.

=== Hiatus ===
BCF was stopped briefly in 2011 before it was resumed in 2012. The festival also went on a two-year hiatus due to COVID-19 pandemic in 2020 and 2021.

== Event ==
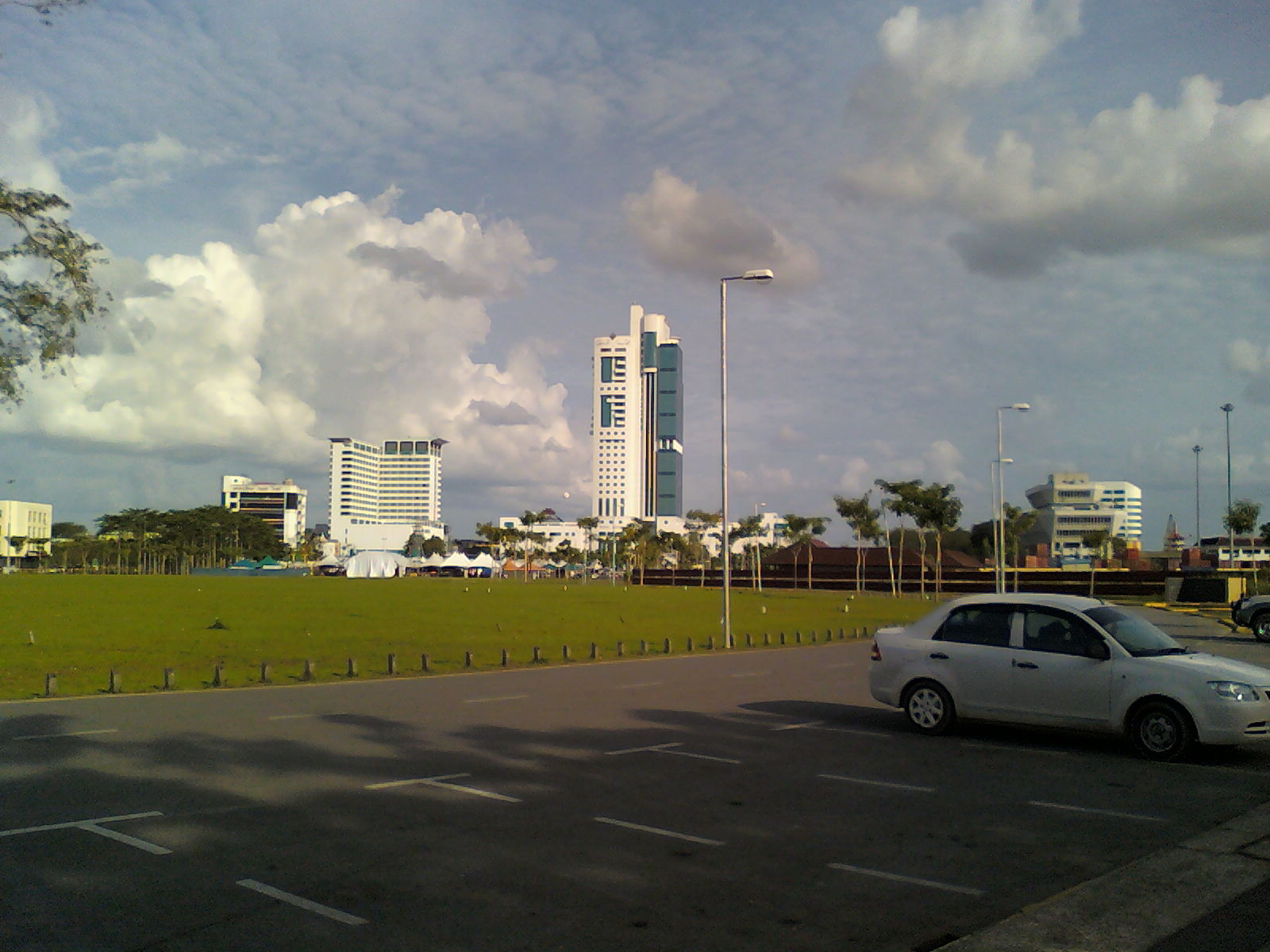
View of Sibu Town Square, where the festival is traditionally held.

Historically, the venue of the main event will be held in Sibu town square so as the trade fair and the exhibition will be held on the second phase of the town square. Usually the main town square which is located next to Wisma Sanyan will be utilised by the stages and food stalls.

=== Dates of the Festival ===
Year	Date	Venue	Attendance
2016	21-30 July	Sibu Town Square	500,000
2017	20-29 July	Sibu Town Square	600,000
2018	19-28 July	Sibu Town Square	N/A
2019	18-27 July	Sibu Town Square	N/A
2020	Not held due to the COVID-19 pandemic		
2021	Not held due to the COVID-19 pandemic		
2022	18-23 July	Sibu Town Square & Sibu Indoor Stadium	N/A
2023	14-23 July	Sibu Town Square	N/A
2024	8-17 August	Sibu Town Square	N/A
2025	3-12 July	Sibu Town Square	N/A
2026	5-14 September	Sibu Town Square	N/A

== Gallery ==
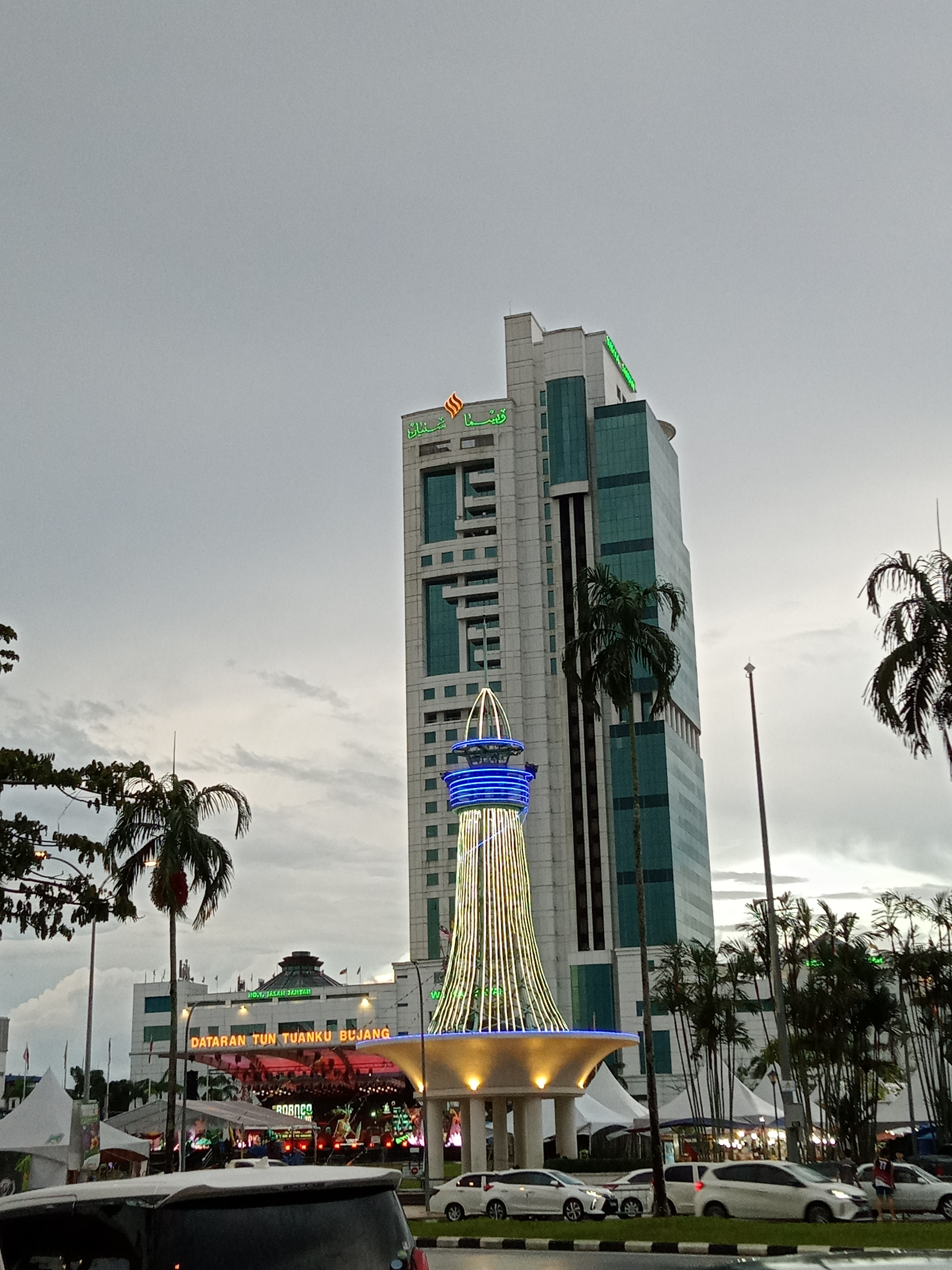
Borneo Cultural Festival with Wisma Sanyan in the background. Pictured in 2024

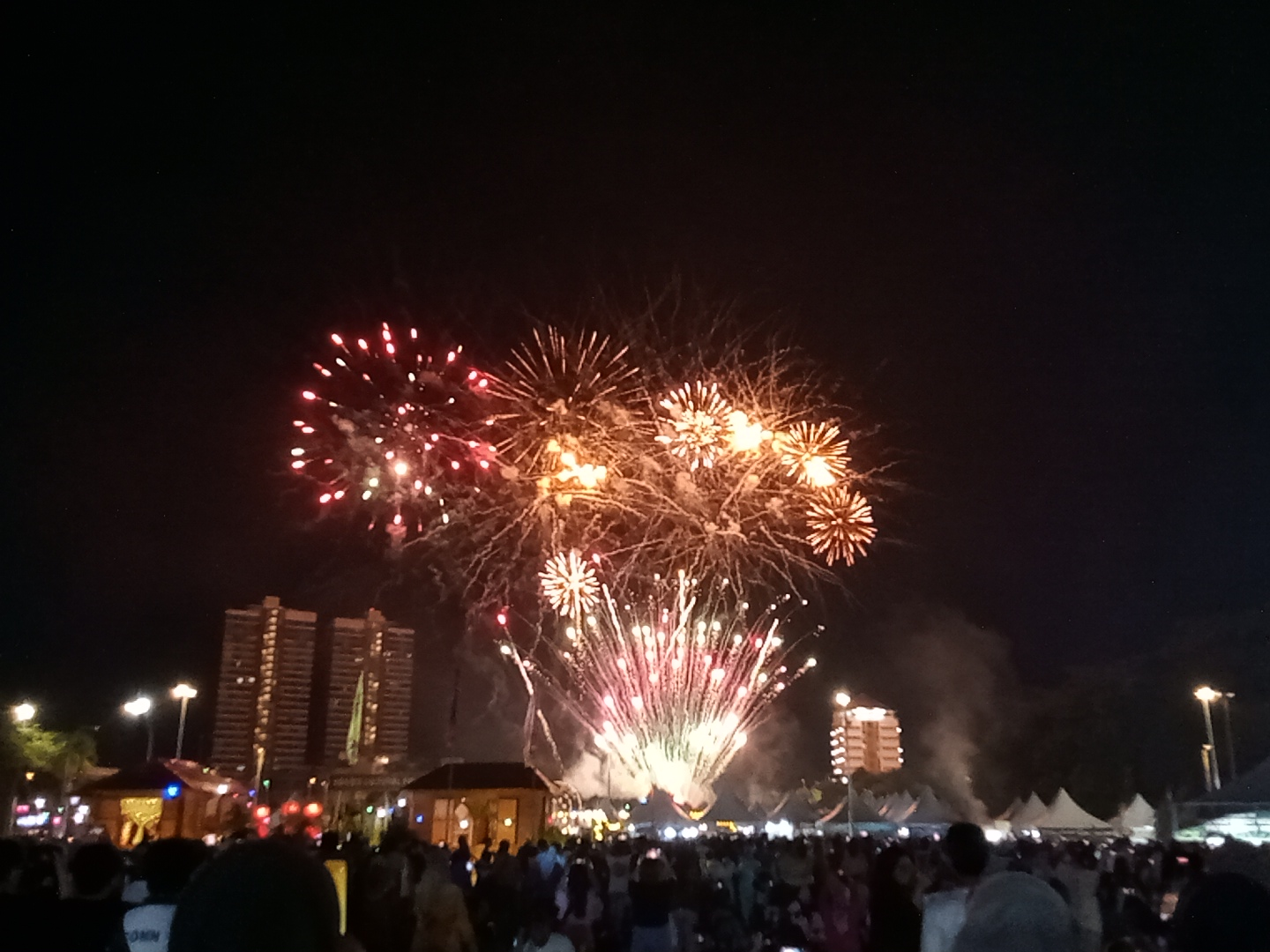
Fireworks on the closing night of the Borneo Cultural Festival 2025 (12 July 2025)
