= Sibu Indoor Stadium =

Stadium in Sibu, Sarawak, Malaysia

- Stadium Tertutup Sibu
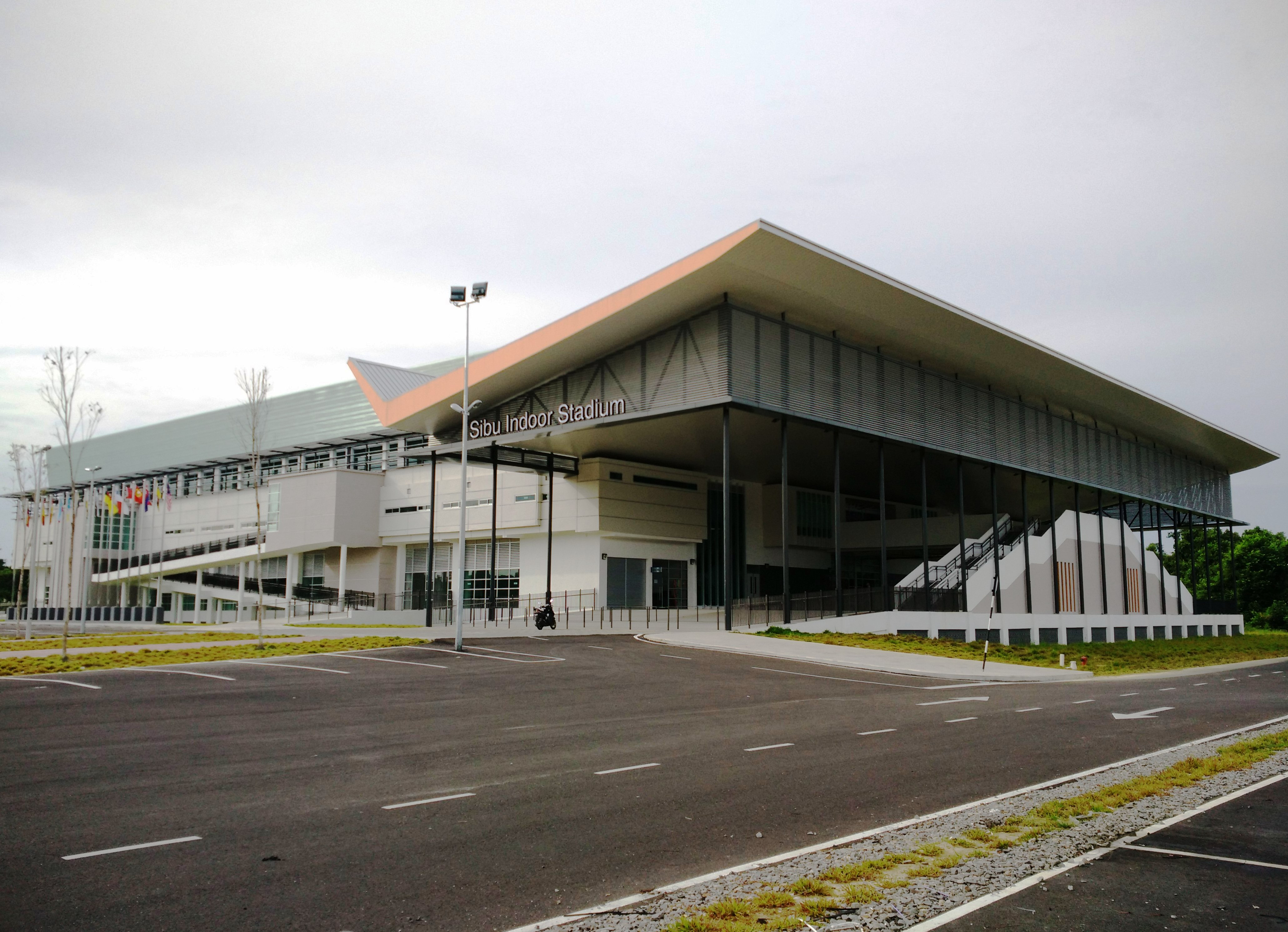
- Sibu Indoor Stadium
- Interactive map of Sibu Indoor Stadium
- Address: Jalan Teng Chun Hua (Airport Lama), 96000 Sibu, Sarawak, Malaysia.
- Location: Sibu, Sarawak, Malaysia
- Coordinates: 2.336513°N 111.845368°E
- Operator: Sarawak Sports Corporation
- Capacity: 4,250 maximum
- Scoreboard: Yes
- Acreage: 10

Construction
- Groundbreaking: 20 June 2014
- Built: 2013-2016
- Opened: 11 July 2016
- Cost: MYR 39 million
- Architect: JRC Architects
- Main contractor: Woodville Sdn Bhd

Website
- www.ssc16.gov.my/facilities/sibu-indoor-stadium/

Sibu Indoor Stadium (Malay: Stadium Tertutup Sibu) is an indoor stadium located in Sibu, Sarawak, Malaysia. The stadium is located on the Old Airport Road, Sibu.

== History ==
The ground breaking of the stadium was held on 20 June 2014 by the Second Finance Minister Datuk Seri Wong Soon Koh. The construction of the stadium was completed on 2 April 2016. The stadium had its soft-opening on 11 July 2016 and was officiated by the State Secretary Tan Sri Datuk Amar Mohd Morshidi Abdul Ghani.

== Facilities ==
The stadium houses eight badminton courts, a basketball court, two volleyball courts, a two-lane jogging track and a grandstand with a seating capacity of 4,250 people. It is also equipped with 479 parking bays for cars, 89 for motorcycles and 16 for stage coaches.

== Notable events ==
Sports and entertainment

- 2016 Sukma Games - Badminton
- 2017 Malaysia Masters Grand Prix Gold
- 2017 AGE Convention (Artistic, Game and Entertainment)
- 2017 Borneo International Martial Art Tournament
- 2017 National Golden Glove Championship
- 2018 Sarawak Civil Service Welfare and Recreational Council (Maksak) Volleyball Championship
- Karnival Lefestour 2019
- Stylofest Sibu 2022
- 17th Sarawak Indoor Archery Championship 2022
- 3rd Sarawak Games (Suksar III) - opening and closing ceremony, taekwondo, boxing
- 2024 Sukma Games - Badminton

=== Live Concerts ===
The stadium has hosted concerts and performances by renowned artists and bands, representing diverse genres from around the world.

Key
| Indicates cancelled shows |

| Date | Main act(s) | Tour / Concert Name | Notes |
|---|---|---|---|
| 8 December 2019 | Masterpiece | Concert Merindang Ke Bintang 1 Dekad Masterpiece | Sold-out concert attended by a crowd of 1,500 people. |
| 28 October 2026 | Air Supply | A Matter of Time Tour | The concert was originally scheduled to be held in Kuching. In light of unforeseen circumstances, the venue has been changed to Sibu Indoor Stadium. |

Celebrations

- 2018 Sarawak Youths Day celebration
- 2020 national-level Malaysia Day celebration
- Part of 2022 Borneo Cultural Festival events
- 2022 Sarawak Day celebration

Others

- COVID-19 quarantine centre
- COVID-19 vaccination centre (PPV)
- Division-level "Sarawak 60 Years of Independence Digital Exhibition"
