= Selangau =

Selangau Pekan Selako
- Town and district capital

Other transcription(s)
  - Chinese: 实兰沟
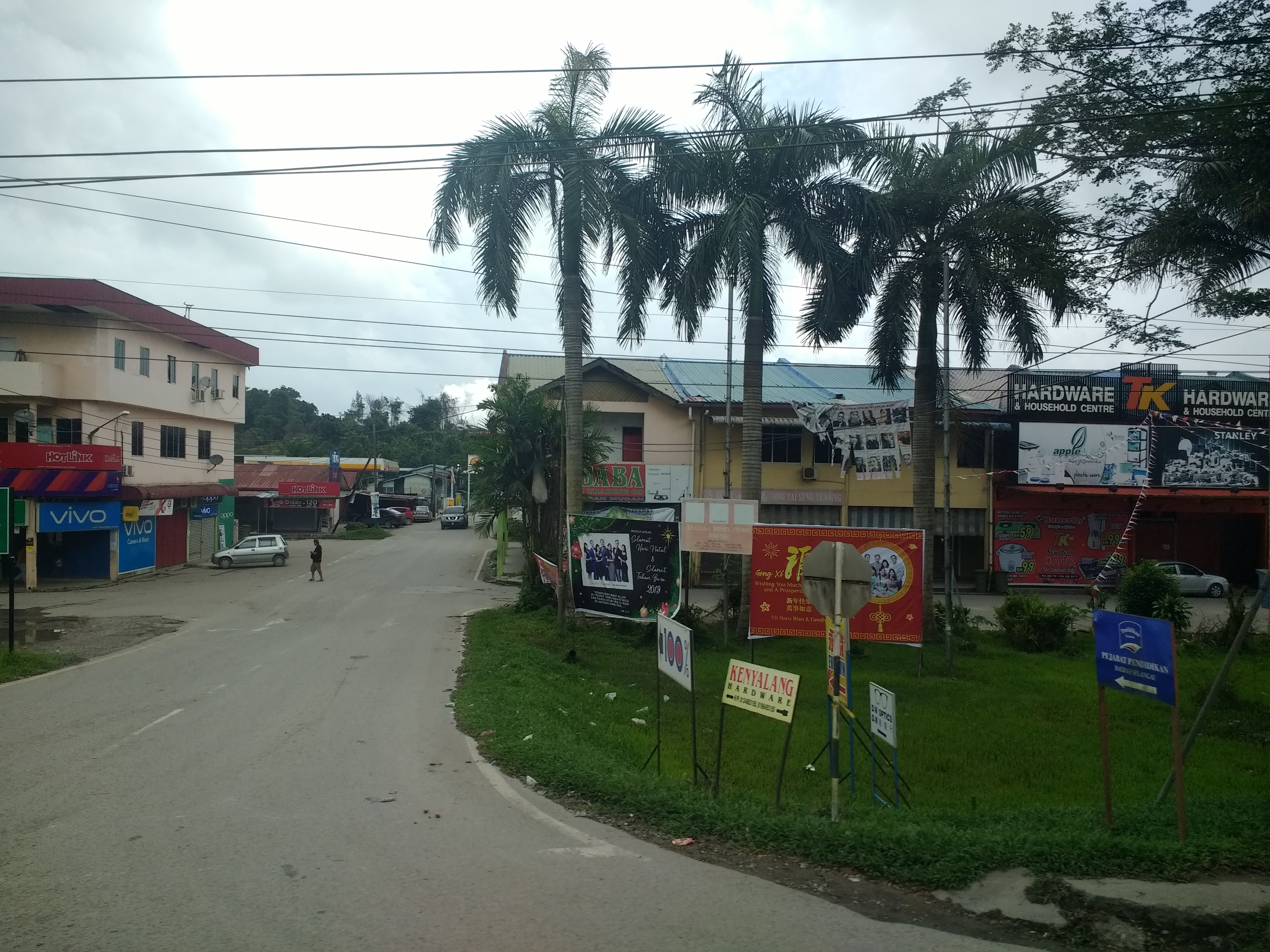

- Location in Malaysia
- Coordinates: 2°31′26″N 112°19′27″E
- Country: Malaysia
- State: Sarawak
- Division: Sibu
- District: Selangau

Population (2010 (district))
  - Total: 24,412
- District Officer: Inting@Enting Anak Nyami
- Website: www.sibu.sarawak.gov.my

Selangau, Sarawak, (Malay: Pekan Selangau) is a small town located by the Pan Borneo Highway (Sibu-Bintulu Road). It is also located by Batang Mukah, a river which flows to the South China Sea. It is located approximately 74 km (46 mi) from Sibu city, 84 km (52 mi) from Mukah town and 134 km (83 mi) from Bintulu town. Selangau town is the administrative centre for the Selangau District.

According to the 2020 Malaysian Population and Housing Census, the population of Selangau was 51,335. The population was 91.3% Malaysian citizens and 8.7% non-citizens, with a gender split of 54.0% male and 46.0% female.

== Etymology ==
The name "Selangau" comes from the name of a river, which is one of the tributaries of the Mukah river.

== History ==
The earliest settlement of Selangau town was near the Selangau river delta (near Nanga Selangau primary school today). Initially, the area was inhabited by the Beketan people before they were displaced by the Iban people from Kanowit and Lemanak river. The Beketan people then moved to Tatau District. Meanwhile, the Iban people inhabited the Selangau delta in the 1930s and 1940s. There were only four shophouses owned by Chinese and Iban people selling groceries at that time.

In the 1960s, after the completion of Pan Borneo Highway between Sibu and Bintulu, these residents then moved their homes to the present location beside the highway. Selangau was originally put under the administration of Mukah district. However, with the increasing number of traders coming to town, has raised the population of the town. In the 1970s, a representative was chosen to administer the town and act as an intermediary between the government and the people. Selangau also become a resting station for the people who ply the highway regularly.

In the 1980s, a great fire burnt down the wooden houses in the town of Selangau. After that concrete houses were built to replace the wooden houses.

Because of the rising population and the development of Selangau, it was declared as a new district on 1 March 2002 with the Selangau town acted as the administrative centre. The Selangau district is now put under the administration of Sibu Division.

== Government ==
Sibu Rural District Council (SRDC) administers the Selangau town and district.

== Geography ==
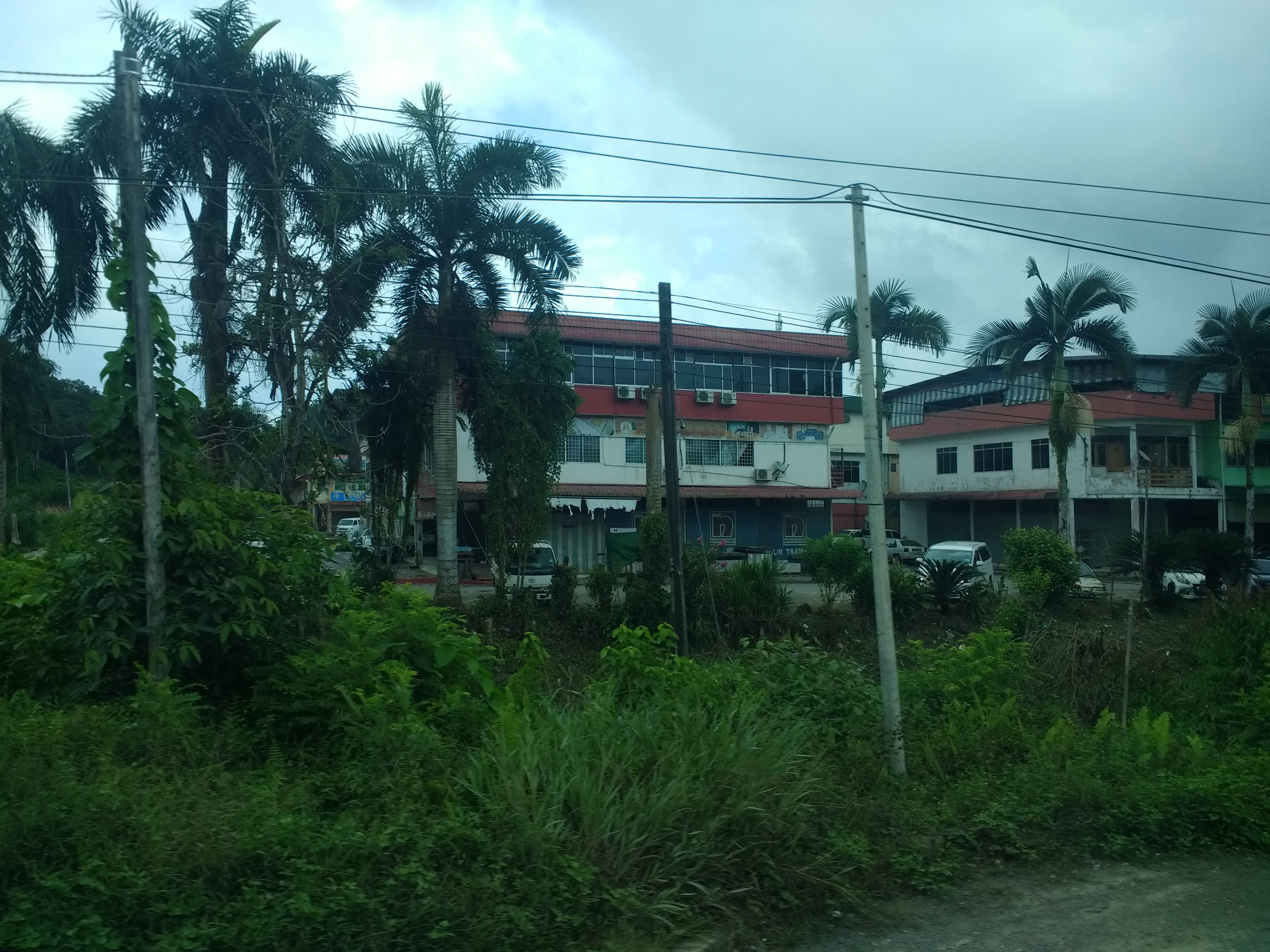
Buildings in Selangau

Selangau town is located at an intersection approximately 74 km from Sibu town, 84 km from Mukah town and 134 km from Bintulu town.

== Climate ==
Selangau has a tropical rainforest climate (Af) with heavy to very heavy rainfall year-round.

Climate data for Selangau
Month	Jan	Feb	Mar	Apr	May	Jun	Jul	Aug	Sep	Oct	Nov	Dec	Year
Mean daily maximum °C (°F)	29.9 (85.8)	30.1 (86.2)	30.9 (87.6)	31.5 (88.7)	32.0 (89.6)	31.8 (89.2)	31.6 (88.9)	31.4 (88.5)	31.4 (88.5)	31.1 (88.0)	30.9 (87.6)	30.5 (86.9)	31.1 (88.0)
Daily mean °C (°F)	26.0 (78.8)	26.2 (79.2)	26.7 (80.1)	27.0 (80.6)	27.5 (81.5)	27.2 (81.0)	26.8 (80.2)	26.8 (80.2)	26.9 (80.4)	26.7 (80.1)	26.6 (79.9)	26.3 (79.3)	26.7 (80.1)
Mean daily minimum °C (°F)	22.2 (72.0)	22.3 (72.1)	22.6 (72.7)	22.6 (72.7)	23.0 (73.4)	22.6 (72.7)	22.1 (71.8)	22.2 (72.0)	22.4 (72.3)	22.4 (72.3)	22.4 (72.3)	22.2 (72.0)	22.4 (72.4)
Average rainfall mm (inches)	446 (17.6)	349 (13.7)	326 (12.8)	235 (9.3)	227 (8.9)	217 (8.5)	181 (7.1)	252 (9.9)	284 (11.2)	296 (11.7)	309 (12.2)	434 (17.1)	3,556 (140)
Source: Climate-Data.org

== Demographics ==
The population (2010) of the district is 24,412.

== Economy ==
Selangau traders serve commuters along the Sibu-Bintulu trunk road on Pan Borneo Highway and workers from surrounding oil palm plantations with daily necessities.

== Transport ==
Selangau is the major stopover station for bus express. Selangau have accessibility of sea and land transportation via cars, trucks, bus and boats. Currently, it was accessed mainly on road as it used many times. Selangau included in Pan Borneo Highway project (WPC 08; Sg. Kua Bridge to Sg. Arip Bridge) and was managed by Lebuhraya Borneo Utara Sdn Bhd (LBU) as a turnkey contractor. The main purpose of this project is replacing the existing two-lane carriageway at the old road to new four-lane two-way carriageway, including a few new lanes and constructing of an interchange at Mukah junction and new bridges, including new Batang Mukah Bridge. The main contractor of this project is Musyati Mudajaya JV (MMJV) Sdn Bhd.

== Other utilities ==
=== Education ===
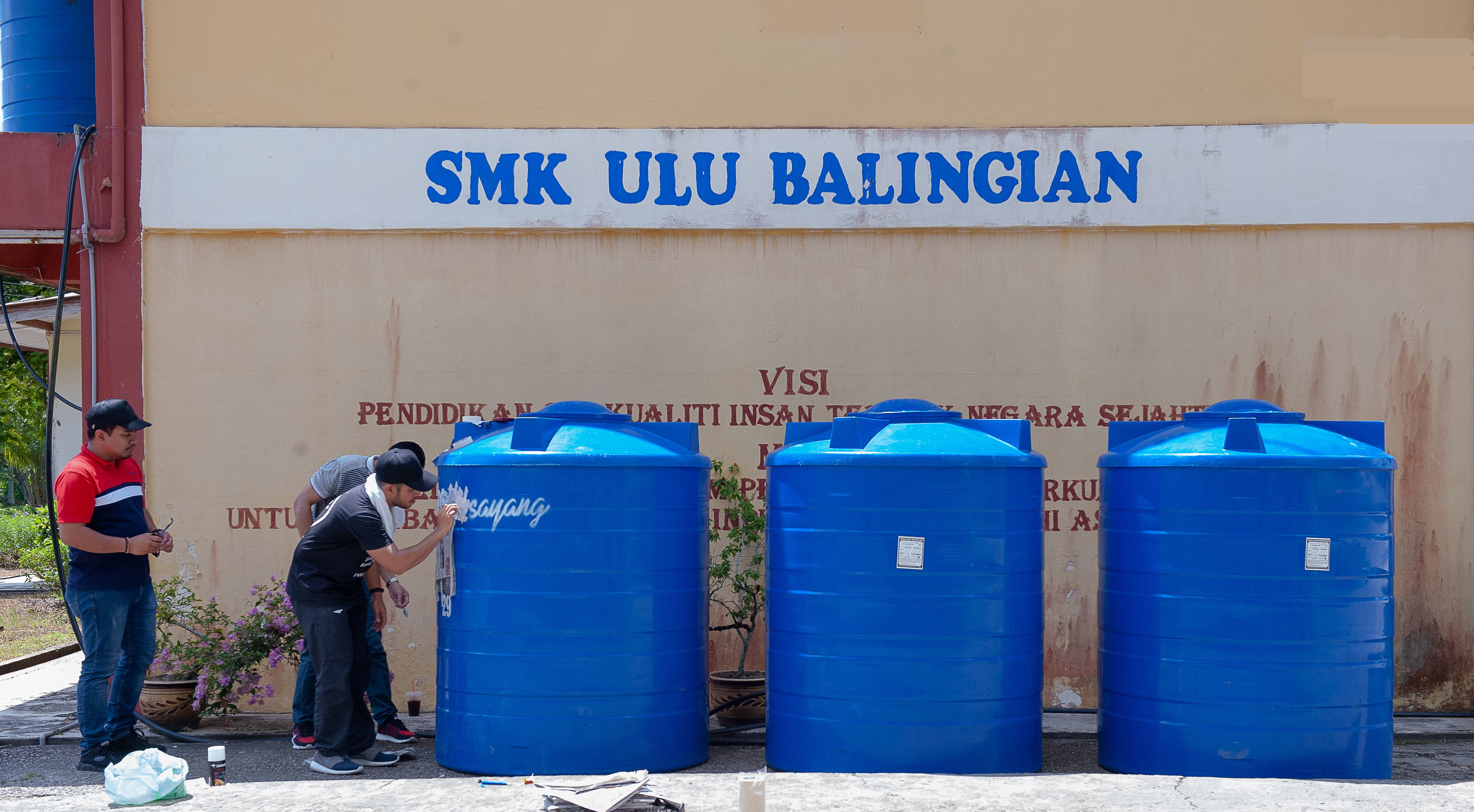
SMK Ulu Balingian

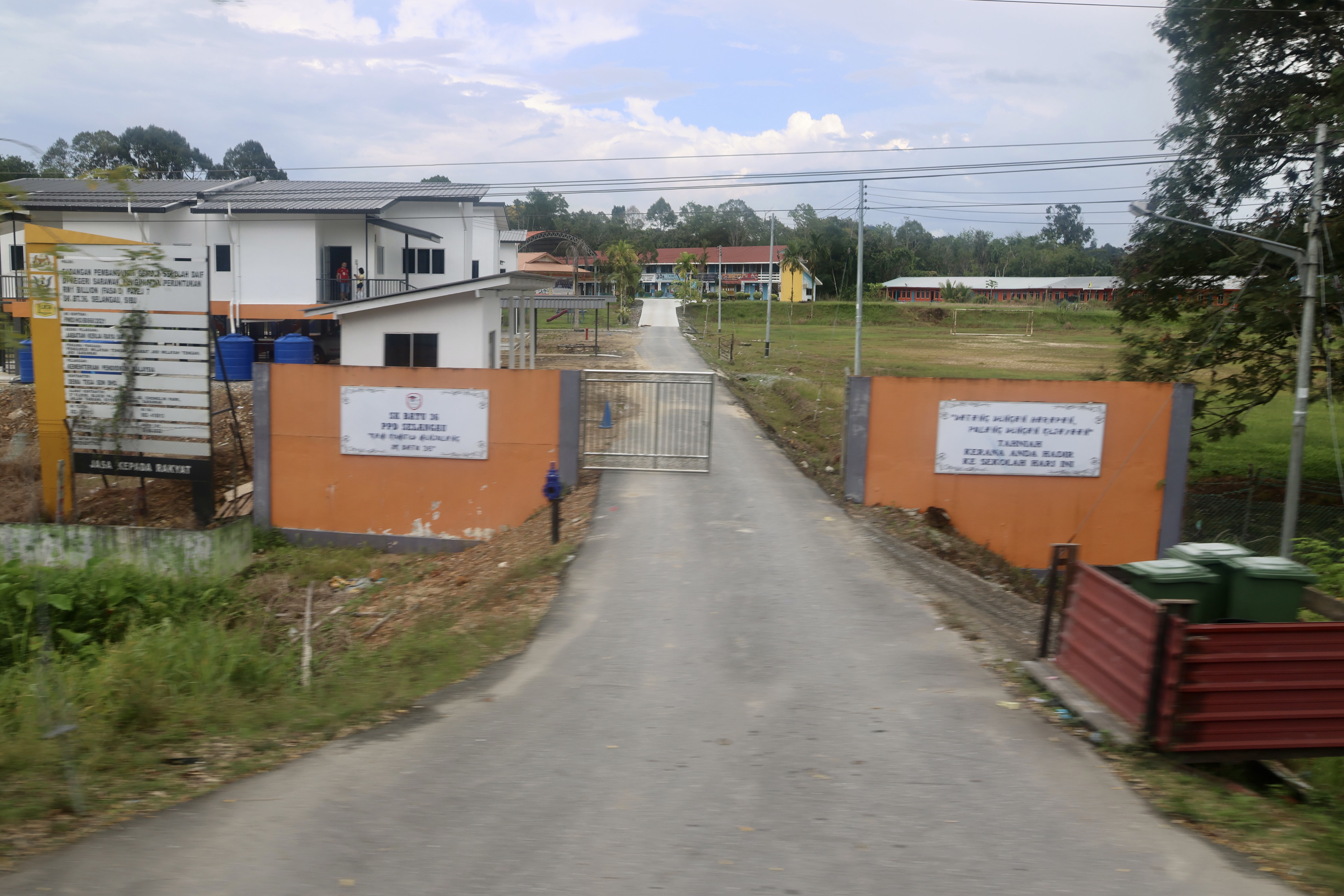
SK Batu 36

==== Primary schools ====
- SK Ulu Sungai Arip
- SK Sungai Tau
- SK Sungai Sepiring
- SK Sungai Pakoh
- SK Sungai Kemena
- SK Sungai Buloh
- SK Sungai Bawang
- SK Sungai Arau
- SK Sungai Anak
- SK St Matthew Sekuau (M)
- SK St Mark (M)
- SK Penghulu Imban
- SK Nanga Tajam
- SK Nanga Selangau
- SK Nanga Kua
- SK Kuala Pelugau
- SK Kuala Lemai
- SK Iban Union
- SK Bukit Arip
- SK Batu 36
- SK Dijih Selangau
- SJK(C) Tong Ah

==== secondary schools ====
- SMK Ulu Balingian

=== Healthcare ===
The town is served by a health clinic, Selangau Health Clinic operated by the Ministry of Health.

=== Fire station ===
The Selangau Fire Department Station was built, serving the emergency services, such as drowning and fire. It was managed by Fire and Rescue Department and Ministry of Housing and Local Government. With its existence, it will reduce response time from Sibu Fire Station and Mukah Fire Station.

== Culture and leisure ==
There is a weekend bazaar at Selangau where natives could sell their jungle produce to their customers. Pesta Selangau (Selangau Festival) is held every year. Among the activities during the festival are: rafting, kayaking, and radio-controlled boat race.

== Federal constituency ==
The federal constituency represented in the Dewan Rakyat is Selangau (federal constituency).
