= Durin Bridge =

Durin Bridge Jambatan Durin
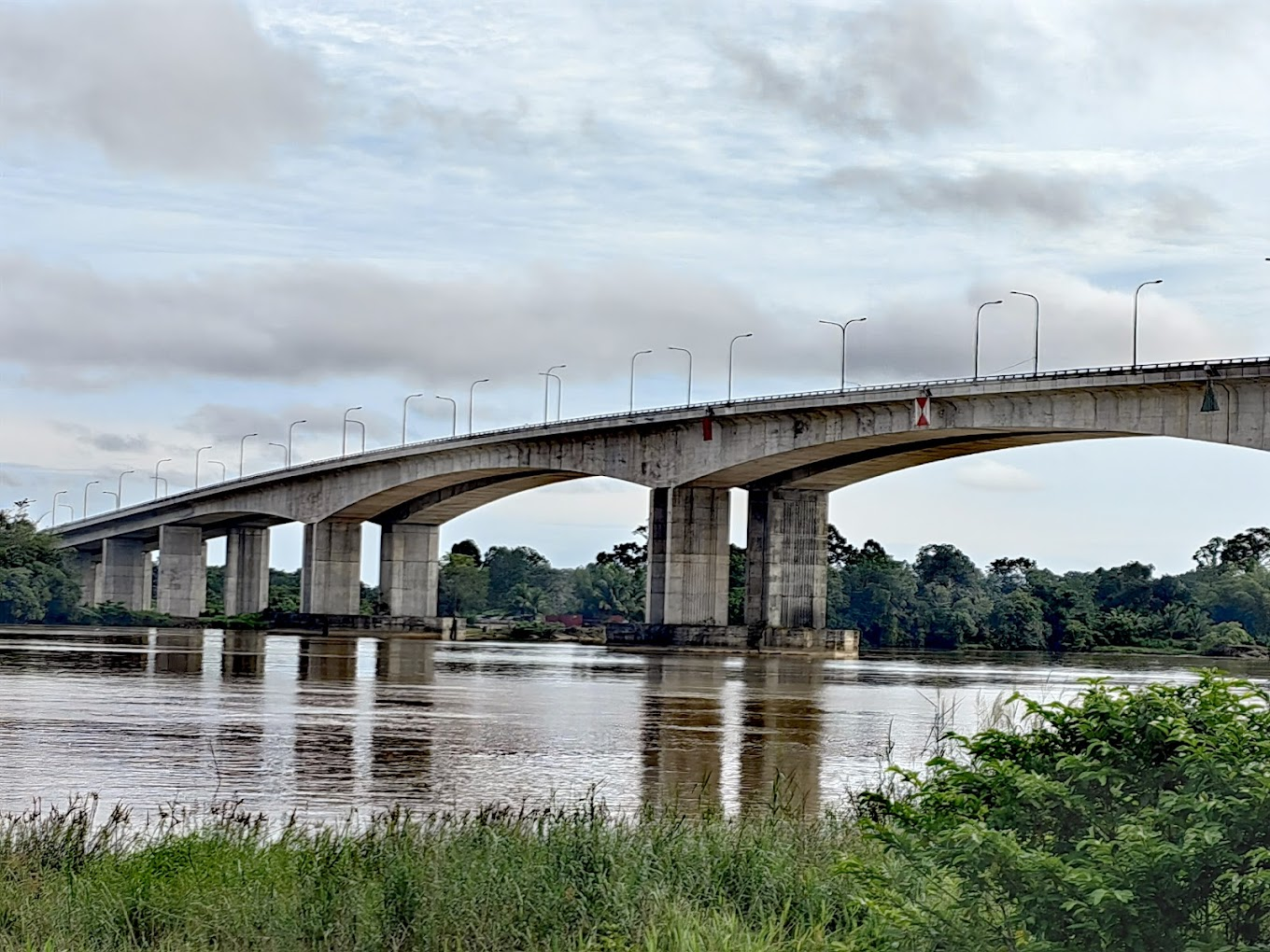
- Coordinates: 2°09′23″N 112°00′52″E
- Carries: Motor vehicles
- Crosses: Rajang River
- Locale: Jalan Sibu-Durin
- Official name: Durin Bridge
- Maintained by: Sarawak Public Works Department (JKR) Sibu Division

Characteristics
- Design: Arch box girder bridge
- Total length: 1.19 km

History
- Designer: Government of Malaysia; Government of Sarawak Phase 1 Sarawak Public Works Department (JKR) Phase 2 Lebuhraya Borneo Utara Sdn Bhd (LBU)
- Constructed by: Hock Seng Lee - Dhaya Maju Infrastructure (Asia) JV Sdn Bhd (Phase 2)

Location
- Interactive map of Durin Bridge

Durin Bridge (Malay: Jambatan Durin) or Sibu-Durin Bridge is a bridge connecting Sibu and Durin in Sarawak, Malaysia. The bridge is part of the Jalan Sibu-Durin of the Pan Borneo Highway.

== History ==
The bridge was opened on 2006 to replace the ferry service between Sibu and Durin. During that time, it was opened as two way bridge. A new bridge parallel to the existing bridge was completed in 2020.

=== Phase 2 ===
During upgrading of the Pan Borneo Highway, Lebuhraya Borneo Utara Sdn Bhd (LBU) wants to doubling the bridge into four on 2015. The phase 2 of the Durin Bridge will be built under the Pan Borneo Highway project and after its completion, it will turned into a four-lane carriageway bridge. Construction is led by LBU as a turnkey contractor and was taken by HSL DMIA JV Sdn Bhd as the main contractor. It is one of the part of Work Package Contract (WPC 07) which connects Bintangor Junction and Sungai Kua Bridge, including Durin Bridge, Julau Interchange and Sibu Airport Interchange. The phase 2 of the bridge is expected to be completed on 2018 or until it is fully completed, according to Works Ministry. In December 2019, the new parallel bridge was completely stitched by Minister of Works, Baru Bian and in 2020, it was started to asphalted and opened to the traffic on the same year while the old one remains intact and now served for Sarikei route.
