= Selangau District =

Place in Sarawak, Malaysia

- Districts of Sarawak

- Location of Selangau in Malaysian Borneo
- Coordinates: 2°29′57″N 112°19′19″E
- District Office location: Selangau
- Local area government: Sibu Rural District Council

Area
  - Total: 3,795 km^{2} (1,465 sq mi)

Population (2024)
  - Total: 49,075
  - Density: 12.93/km^{2} (33.49/sq mi)
- District Officer: Yalin Anak Asan
- Postcode: 96000

Map of Selangau District

The Selangau District is a district in Sarawak, Malaysia.

== History ==
Selangau was declared a district on 1 March 2002.

== Demographics ==
=== Ethnicity ===
Ethnic composition of Selangau District (2024)
Ethnicities / Nationality	Percentage
Malays	5.81%
Iban	81.21%
Bidayuh	0.22%
Melanau	4.43%
Other Bumiputeras	0.07%
Chinese	7.98%
Indians	0%
Others	0%
Non-Malaysian	0.29%

Ethnicity	2024	
Ethnicity	Pop.	%
Malays	2850	5.81%
Iban	39854	81.21%
Bidayuh	108	0.22%
Melanau	2176	4.43%
Other Bumiputeras	32	0.07%
Chinese	3915	7.98%
Indians	0	0%
Others	0	0%
Malaysian total	48935	99.71%
Non-Malaysian	140	0.29%
Total	49075	100.00%

Historical population
Year	Pop.	±%
1975	6,130	—
1980	8,512	+38.9%
1985	10,834	+27.3%
1990	15,173	+40.0%
1995	19,532	+28.7%
2004	25,410	+30.1%
2010	31,286	+23.1%
2015	38,564	+23.3%
2024	49,075	+27.3%
