= Sibu Division =

Sibu
- Divisions of Sarawak

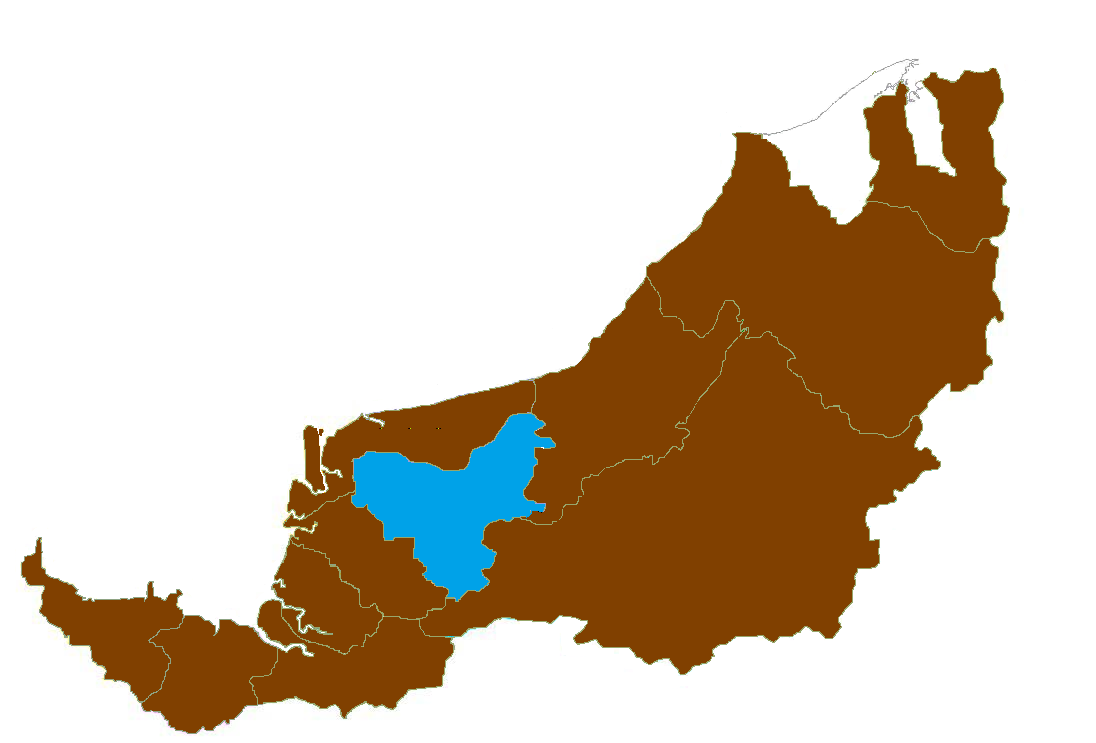
- Division Office location: Sibu
- Local area government(s): Sibu Municipal Council (SMC); Majlis Daerah Kanowit (MDK); Sibu Rural District Council (SRDC)

Area
  - Total: 8,278.3 km^{2} (3,196.3 sq mi)

Population (2010)
  - Total: 293,514
  - Density: 35.456/km^{2} (91.830/sq mi)
- Resident & Chairman: Charles Siaw
- License plate prefix: QE, QS

Sibu Division is one of the twelve administrative divisions of Sarawak, Malaysia. It has a total area of 8,278.3 square kilometres, and is the third largest division after Kapit Division and Miri Division.

The population of Sibu Division (year 2000 census) was 257,300. Ethnically, the population was mostly Iban, Chinese, Malay, and Melanau.

Sibu Division consists of three districts: Sibu, Kanowit, and Selangau.

The economy is largely based on timber extraction from the extensive tropical rainforest. Processed wood products, rather than log export has been given priority by the government. Agriculture is relatively minor, with oil palm and pepper the main products. Tourism, particularly ecotourism, is a growing component of the economy.

The two major rivers in the Sibu Division are the Rajang River and the Igan River.

== Early history ==
Before 1 June 1873, Sibu was known as "Maling", named after the winding portion, Tanjung Maling, on the other side of Rejang River. Maling was a small village with a few small and simple shop houses consisted of atap roof and wooden walls and floors. Main population was Malay and Chinese was minority.

In 1841, "Sarawak" (the present Kuching - Sarawak capital) was ruled by 'White Rajah', James Brooke. On 1 June 1873, the third division was created and the division was named after the native Rambutan because the division had a lot of native Rambutan known as "Buah Sibau" in Iban language.

In 1901, Wong Nai Siong led the first batch of Foochows from China to Sibu to open up the fertile lands of Sibu for cultivation, a massive opening up of Sibu. Therefore, it was a landmark year or a milestone in the history of the development of Sibu.

Wong Nai Siong came to Singapore in September 1899. From there, he proceeded to West Malaysia, Sumatra and the Dutch East Indies. For six months he explored the places but failed to find a suitable place for the immigration and settlement of his folks in China. In April 1900, Wong came to Sarawak and got the approval of the Sarawak Rajah to look for a suitable site for Chinese immigrants.

Wong explored the lower valley and upper reaches of the Rejang River. He soon discovered that the Rejang Delta was very fertile and particularly suitable for cultivation. He decided to choose the area for opening up for cultivation. With that decision, Wong went to see the second Rajah of Sarawak, Rajah Charles Brooke, for discussions regarding the matter of opening up of land for cultivation. In those days of the Rajahs, Sarawak was sparsely populated with vast land yet to be developed, Wong's plan was timely and very much appreciated.

When Wong went to see Sir Charles Brooke and explained to him his plan to lead large groups of Foochows to open up Sibu for cultivation, the Rajah immediately agreed. Both parties signed an agreement.

The Chinese immigrants came in three batches. The first batch consisted of 72 people, the second batch 535, and the third batch 511, totalling 1,118 people. Of the total, 130 brought their spouses and families, while the others were bachelors. After working in Sibu, nearly all the immigrants chose to settle down and made Sibu their new home. They were happy to settle down for a brighter future in Sibu.

== Administration ==
Administrative districts of Sibu Division

=== Members of Parliament ===
Parliament	Member of Parliament	Party
P210 Kanowit	YB Datuk Aaron Ago Dagang	GPS (PRS)
P211 Lanang	YB Puan Alice Lau	PH (DAP)
P212 Sibu	YB Tuan Oscar Ling	PH (DAP)
P214 Selangau	YB Tuan Edwin Banta	GPS (PRS)
