= Wisma Sanyan =

Building in Sarawak, Malaysia

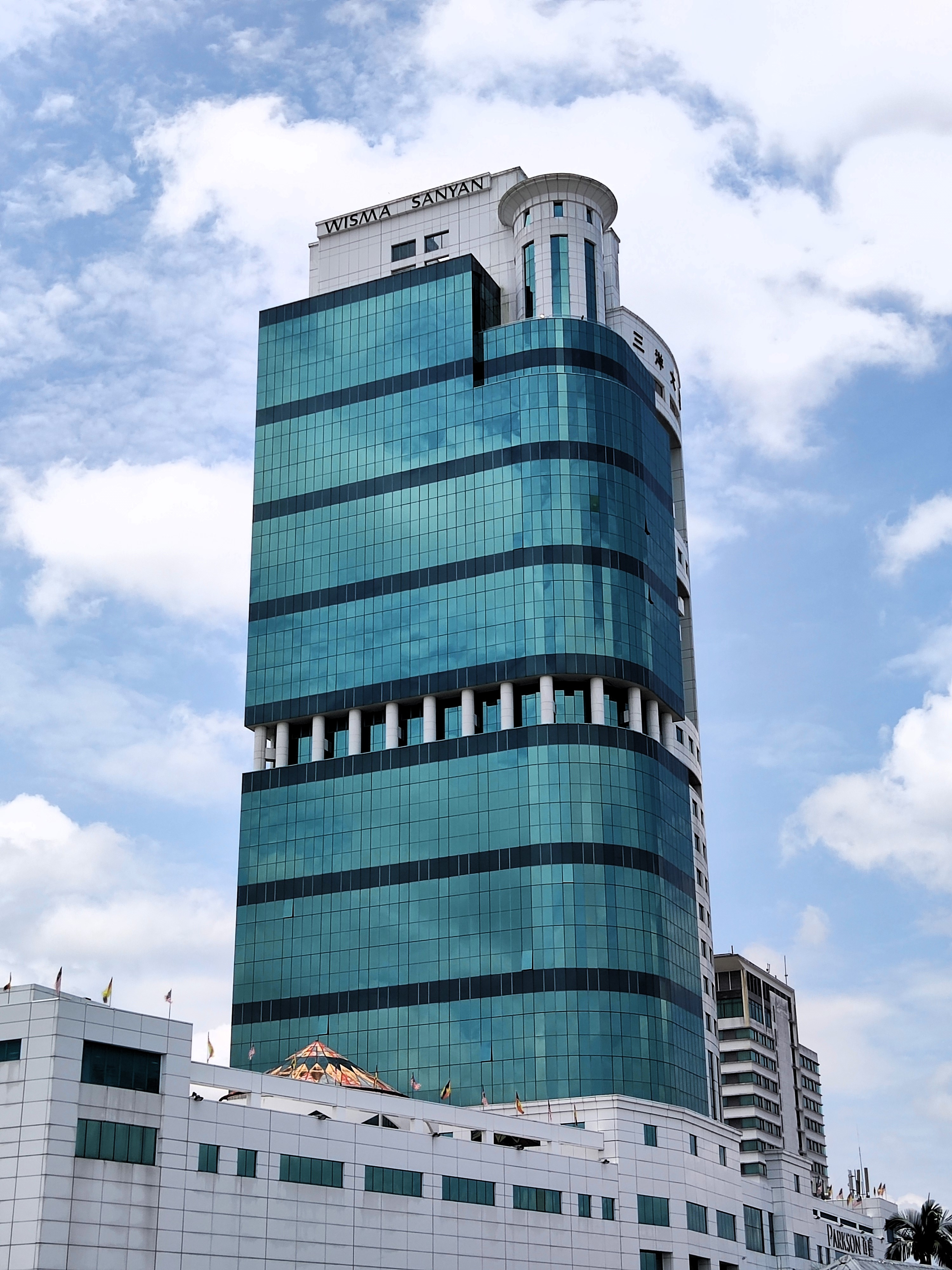
- Wisma Sanyan
- Interactive map of the Wisma Sanyan area

Record height
- Tallest in Sarawak from 2001 to 2019^{[I]}
- Surpassed by: Naim The Peak Condominium Bintulu

General information
- Status: Completed
- Type: Office, restaurant, shopping mall
- Location: Sibu, Sarawak, Malaysia
- Coordinates: 2°17′26″N 111°49′31″E
- Construction started: 2000
- Completed: 2001
- Opening: 2001
- Cost: (US$34 million)
- Owner: Sanyan Holdings Sdn Bhd
- Operator: Pelita Towerview Sdn Bhd

Height
- Roof: 126 m (413 ft)

Technical details
- Floor count: 28
- Lifts/elevators: Schindler

Design and construction
- Architect: Jurubina Unireka
- Developer: Mori Building Co.

Website
- www.wismasanyan.com.my

Wisma Sanyan
- Traditional Chinese: 三洋大廈
- Simplified Chinese: 三洋大厦
Transcriptions
Standard Mandarin
- Hanyu Pinyin: Sānyáng Dàshà

Wisma Sanyan was the tallest building in the state of Sarawak, Malaysia from its completion in 2001 to 2019.

Wisma Sanyan's title as Borneo's tallest building was taken by the 33-storey Kinabalu Tower in Kota Kinabalu which was completed in 2016. In 2019, its title as Sarawak's tallest building was surpassed by the 34-storey residential tower, Naim The Peak Condominium in Bintulu.

== Tenants ==
Opened in 2001, the building serves many purposes, amongst them shopping mall, restaurant and offices. It is the headquarters of Sanyan Group, which is one of Sarawak's largest timber companies. Besides that, government agencies such as the Public Works Department, Sarawak State Religious Department and also local authorities such as the Sibu Municipal Council (SMC) and Sibu Rural District Council (SRDC) are also based here. However most of the Government agencies (except for Public Works Department, SRDC and SMC) have relocated to the brand-new Sarawak Islamic Complex building.

The shopping mall occupies 5 levels of the building and offering 14,350 square meter of retail space. It houses Parkson as the anchor tenant, supermarket, F&B outlets and a variety of shops.

== Events ==
=== Sibu BASE Jump ===
Sibu BASE Jump is an annual event held in September. The event is organized by Sibu Tourism Task Force Group with Sibu Base Jumptechnical support by BASE Jumper from Australia and Malaysia. BASE jumpers launch from the top of the building and land in Sibu Town Square.

=== Sibu Tower Run ===
The inaugural Sibu Tower Run was held in conjunction with Visit Sibu Year in March 2017. The Sibu Tower Run is limited to 350 participants where runners will be running up the 627 steps of staircase of Wisma Sanyan in its final leg. For its fourth edition to be held in 2020, participants no longer need to run the usual two rounds around the Sibu Town Square but will proceed straight to the staircase of the building. The run is organised by Sibu Municipal Council (SMC) and Methodist Pilley Institute (MPI) Alumni Association, with support from Concept Event Agency. The run is the first and only tower run in Sarawak.

== Gallery ==
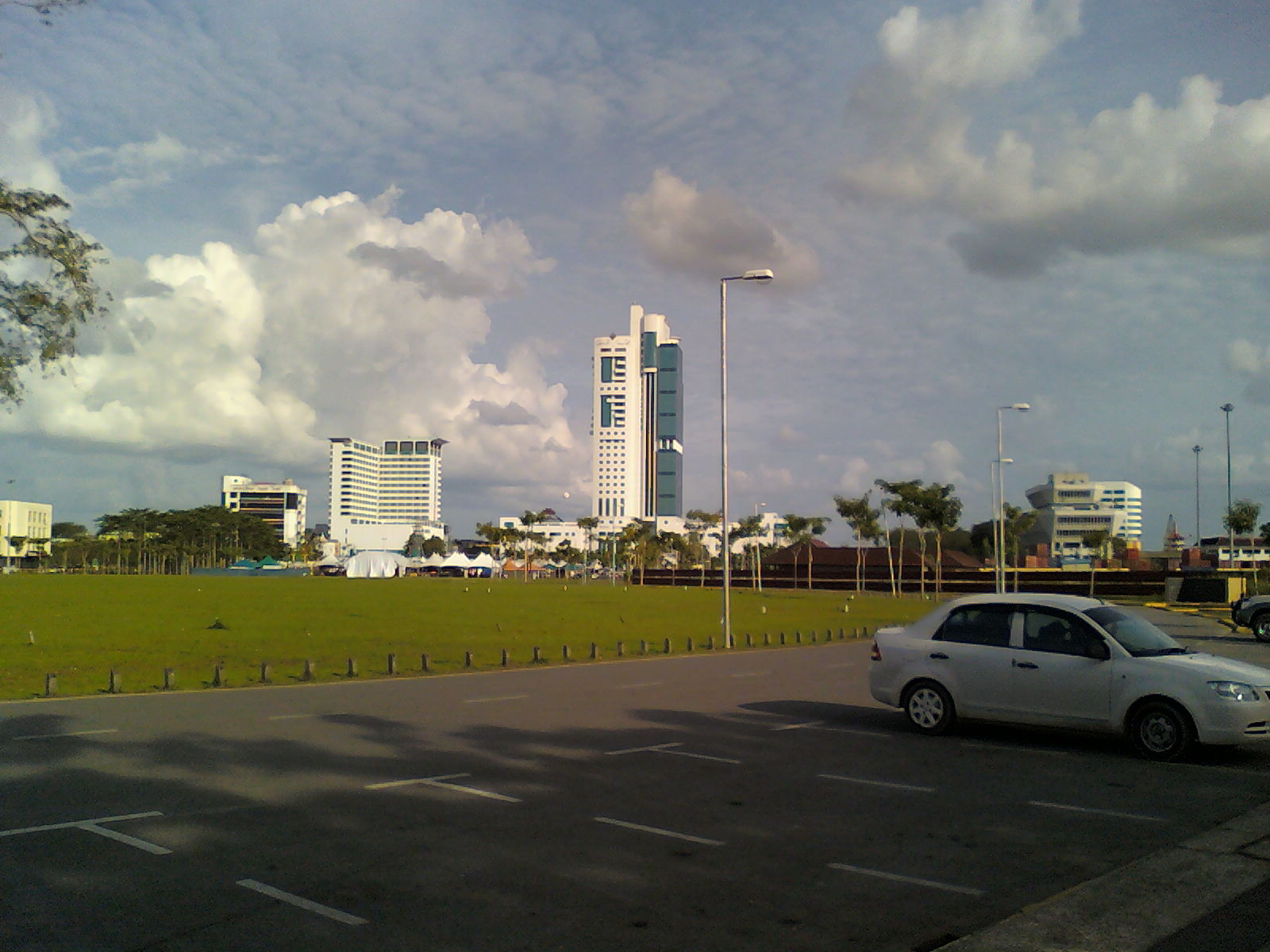
Wisma Sanyan as seen from the waterfront.

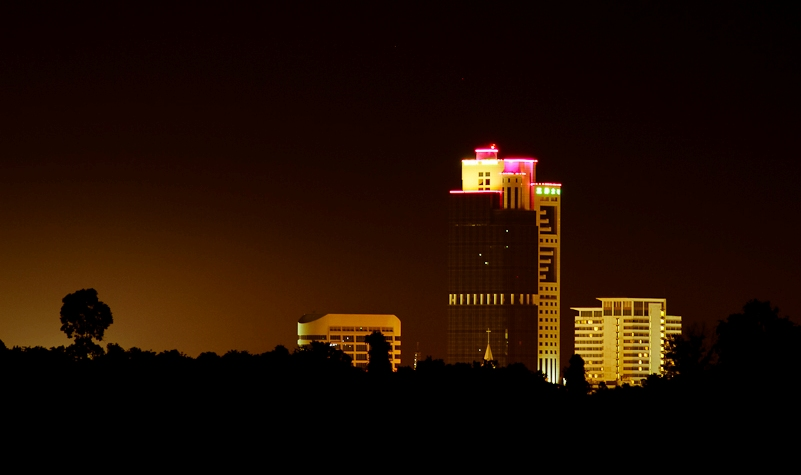
Night view of Wisma Sanyan

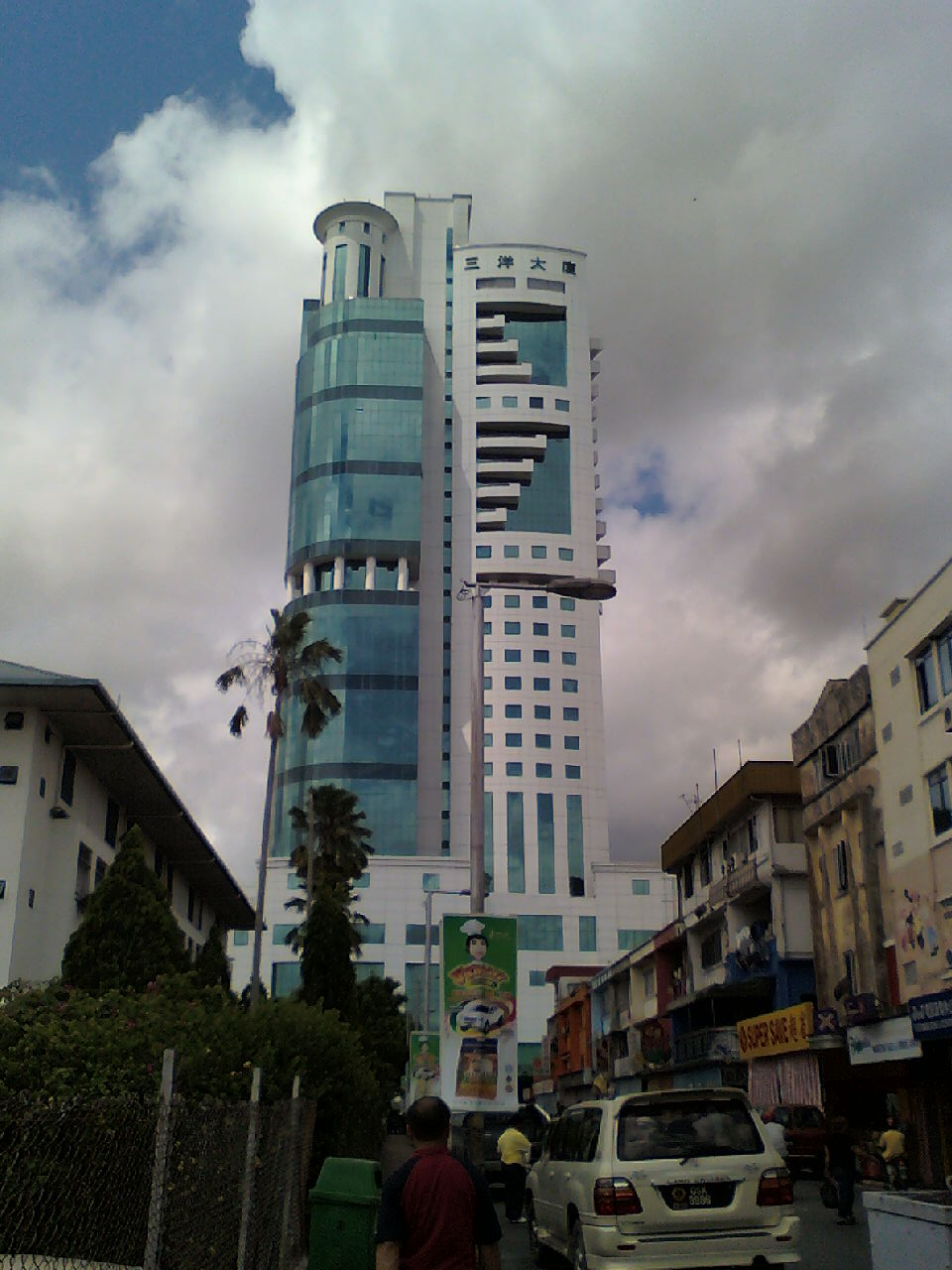
Wisma Sanyan as seen from Jalan Morshidi Sidek.

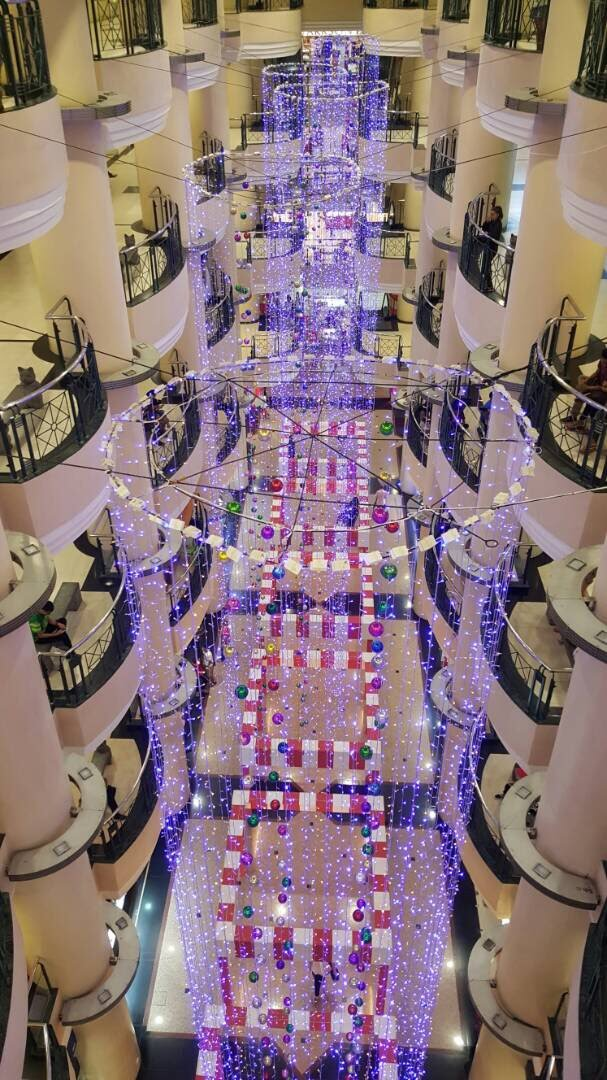
The interior of Wisma Sanyan shopping centre decorated during the 2017 Christmas season.

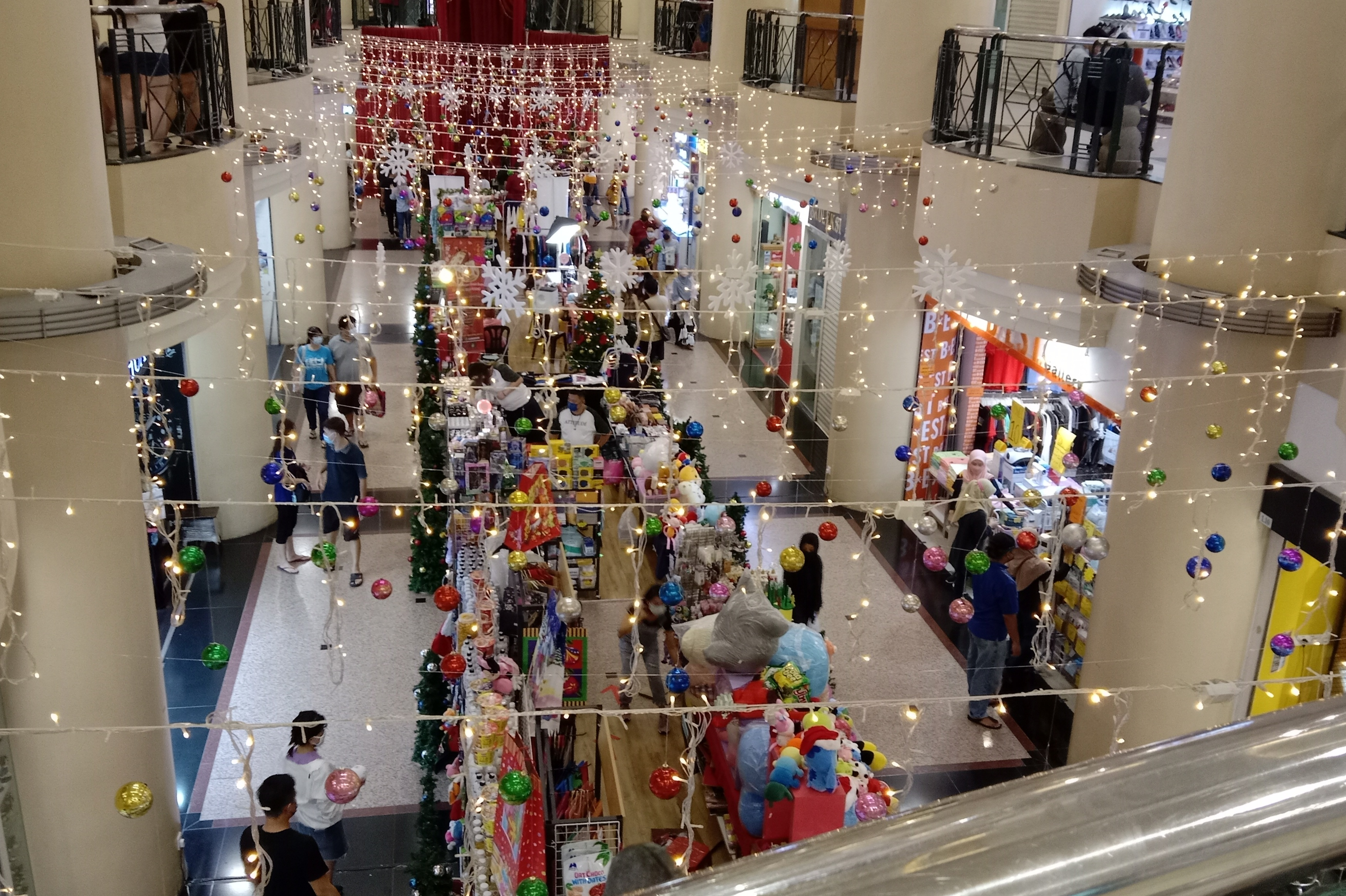
The interior of Wisma Sanyan shopping centre decorated during the 2021 Christmas season.

== See also ==
- List of towers
