= Sibu Rural District Council =

Sibu Rural District Council Majlis Daerah Luar Bandar Sibu
- Local Authorities Ordinance 1996

Type
- Type: Local authority of the Sibu Jaya and Selangau

History
- Founded: 1 January 1952

Leadership
- Chairman: Cr. Sempurai Petrus Ngelai
- Deputy Chairman: Cr Wong Ching Yong (appoint on 1 August 2020)
- Secretary: Mr Ng Siang Wei (January 2023)

Motto
- T.E.A.M (Together Everyone Achieve More)

Meeting place
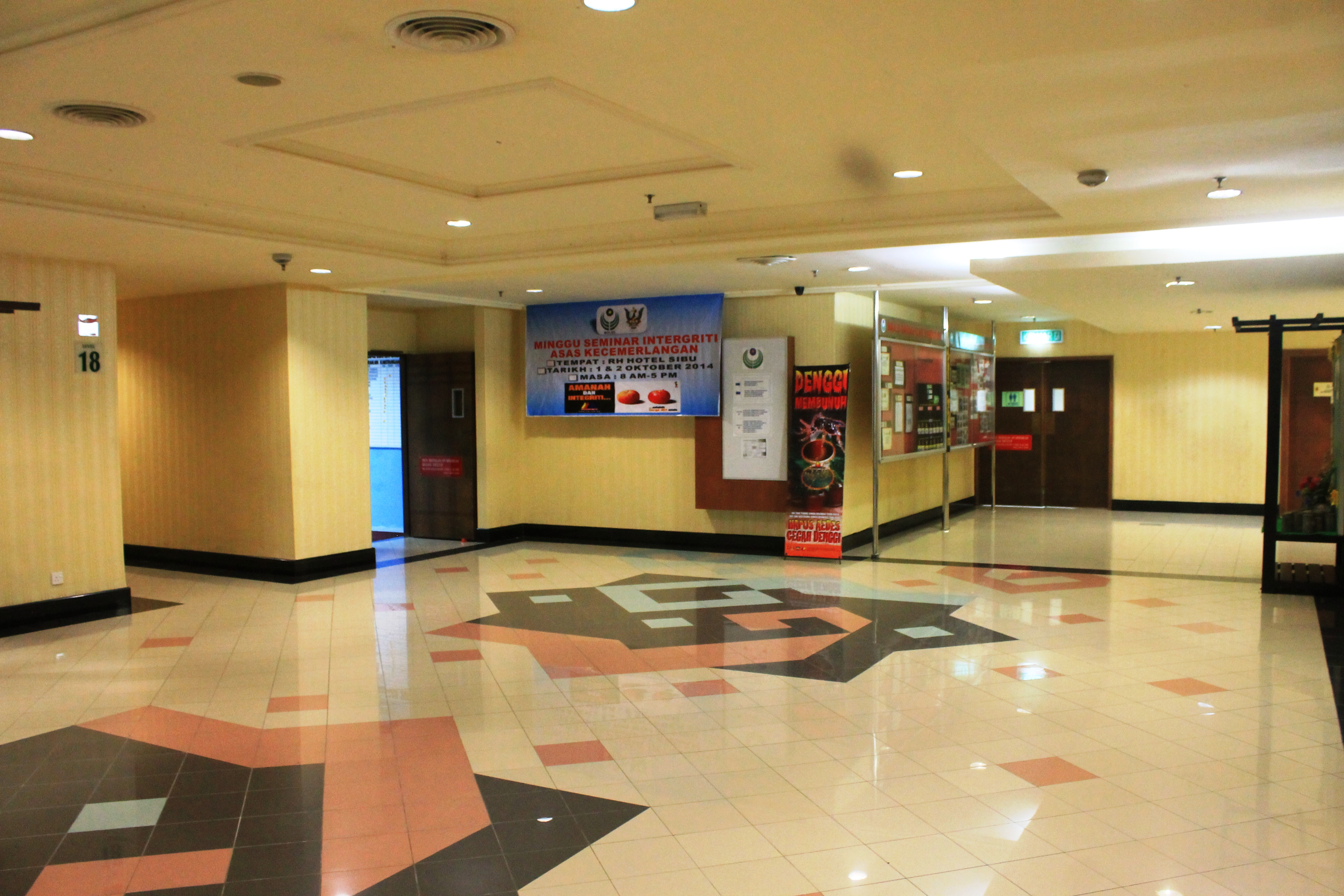
- Sibu Rural District Council, Floor 18, Wisma Sanyan, Sibu, Sarawak.

Website
- www.srdc.gov.my

Footnotes
- Known as Dayak Local Authority in the 1940s and later renamed as Local Authority Sibu

Sibu Rural District Council (Malay: Majlis Daerah Luar Bandar Sibu) (MDLBS or SRDC) is a local authority which administers Sibu rural areas such as Sibu Jaya and Selangau District. The agency is under the purview of Ministry of Local Government & Housing Sarawak (MLGH). The establishment of this council is to provide basic amenities, public infrastructure, and professional services to the population under its jurisdiction.

== History ==
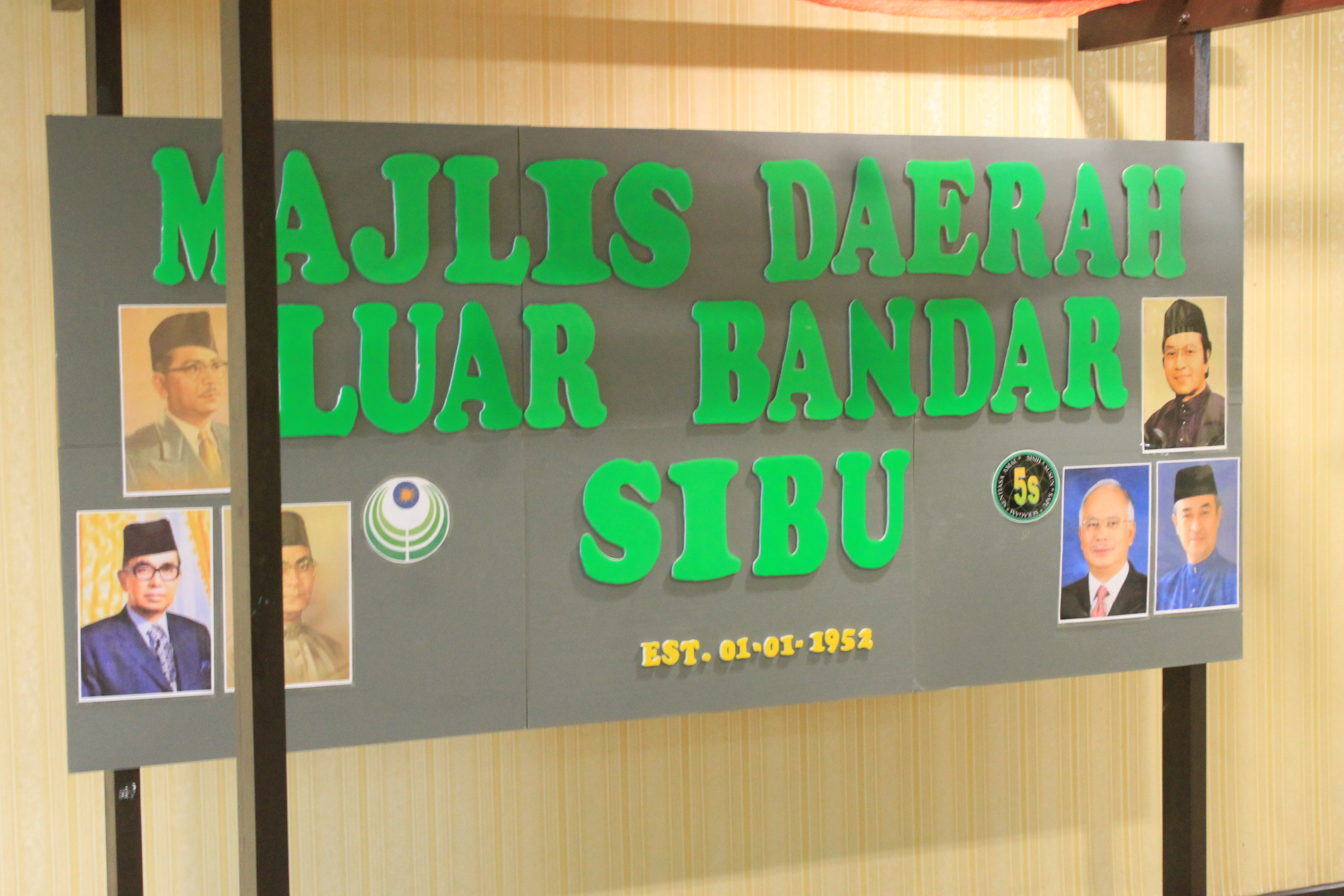
Sibu Rural District Council

The roots of SRDC can be dated back to 1940s where it was known as "Dayak Local Authority" which was under the chairmanship of Penghulu Imai. Its members were made up of Iban local chiefs of Sibu. The name was changed to "Local Authority Sibu" after it was put under the administration of British Colonial Officers.

== Administration ==
SRDC currently administers part of the Sibu District and Selangau District covering a total area of 6,000 km^{2} (2,300 sq mi). The area of administration contains a total of 60,000 population which are mainly Ibans. In 1981, due to a delineation exercise, one of the areas under SRDC was incorporated into Sibu Municipal Council (SMC). Another area known as Igan region was taken over by Matu-Daro District Council in October 1991.

== See also ==
- Sibu Municipal Council (SMC)
