= Sibu Municipal Council =

- Majlis Perbandaran Sibu

Agency overview
- Formed: 1 November 1981; 44 years ago
- Preceding agency: Sibu Urban District Council (1952–1981) Sibu Municipal Board (1925–1951)
- Jurisdiction: Sibu
- Headquarters: Floor 19-24, Wisma Sanyan, Jalan Sanyan, 96000 Sibu, Sarawak, Malaysia
- Motto: Serving People, Enhancing Lives (Berkhidmat untuk rakyat, mempertingkatkan kehidupan)
- Agency executives: Clarence Ting Ing Horh, Chairman; Mohammed Abdullah Izkandar Bin Dato' Roseley, Deputy Chairman; Yong Ing Chu, Municipal Secretary
- Website: smc.gov.my

The Sibu Municipal Council (Malay: Majlis Perbandaran Sibu, abbreviated SMC or MPS) is the municipal council which administers the district of Sibu in the state of Sarawak, Malaysia.

== History ==
=== Sibu Municipal Board ===
Sibu Municipal Board was founded on 31 January 1925 during the period of Kingdom of Sarawak. Resident of the third division of Sarawak was the chairman of the municipal board. The municipal officer at that time was Sibu District Officer. Other members of the municipal board includes Sibu Divisional Engineer, Superintendent of Sibu Lands & Surveys, and Sibu Divisional Medical Officer. "Unofficial members" which is also known as Sibu Municipal Commissioners were nominated from the leaders of various communities.

=== Sibu Urban District Council (SUDC) ===
Sibu Municipal Board was named to Sibu Urban District Council in 1952 when the Council is capable of managing its own finances and internal affairs. The Sibu District Officer was the chairman of the Council until 1957. The original area of jurisdiction for the Council was 3 square miles (7.77 km^{2}). The area was extended to 20 square miles (51.8 km^{2}) in 1957. In 1947, the population was 9,983 but it increased to 29,630 in 1960. Sibu town roads was completed by Public Works Department (consisted 16.61 miles (26.73 km) of bitumen road and 6.59 miles (10.61 km)) gravel roads was handed over to the Council in 1962. First attempt of bitumen road construction was done by the Council at Tiong Hua Road.

Bus shelters were provided since 1960s. The Council also spent RM 45,000 for the construction of bitumen running track for "King George VI Memorial Grounds" (now "Padang Sukan Tun Datuk Patinggi Tuanku Haji Bujang" at Bukit Lima Sports Complex, Sibu). Olympic sized swimming pool was completed by Public Works Department in November 1963 at a cost of RM 0.5 million. Sibu Fire Brigade moved out from old place (now MAKSAK Building at Channel Road/Cross Road) and shifted into present Fire station at Central Road on 25 December 1959. The Council also completed Island Road/Hospital Road pavement for Lau King Howe Hospital in 1958, bus station (now used for car parks at Market Road) in 1959, Sungei Bakong Market and Channel Road Market in 1959, Khoo Peng Loong Road Market in 1964, and Channel Road Hawkers' Stand in 1965.

After the Kuching Municipal Council election in 1956, SUDC followed suit in the following year with a local council election held on 15 December 1957. A total of 50 people were contesting for the seats. A total of 85.4% of the electorate voted in this election. The newly elected Council took office on 1 January 1958.

=== Sibu Municipal Council (SMC) ===
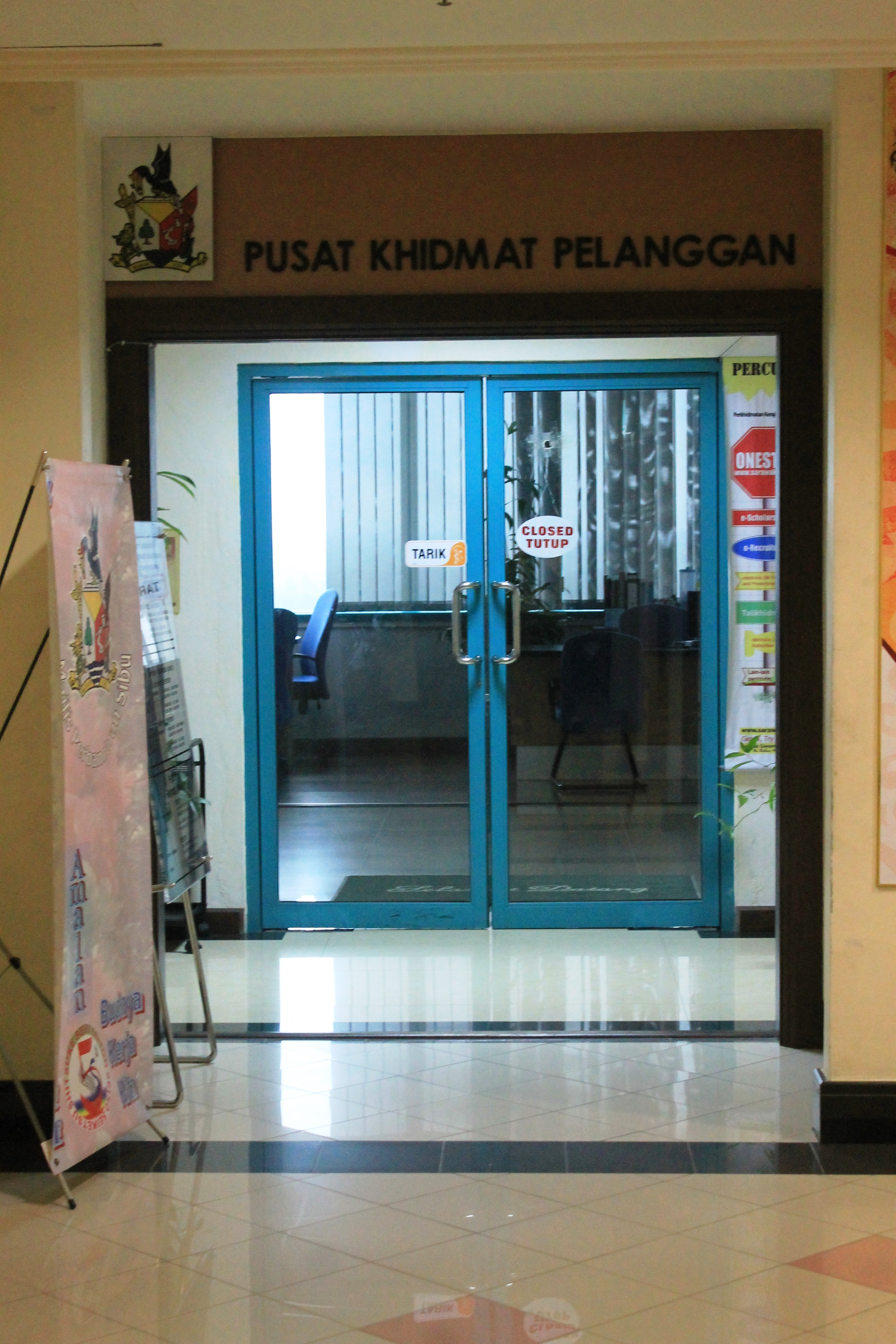
SMC customer service centre on 21st floor Wisma Sanyan.

SUDC was upgraded to Sibu Municipal Council (SMC) on 1 November 1981. In 1991, the Sibu Municipality have 126,000 residents. Chairman, Deputy Chairman, and 24 Councillors are to serve the SMC for 2-year term. During this period, Traffic Garden at Rejang Park was completed in 1983, Rejang Esplande Park was completed in 1988, Mission Road Mini Park was completed in 1990, Bukit Lima Recreational Park in 1991, Multi-Storey Car Park at Jalan Kampung Nyabor and Jalan Wong Nai Siong in 1993, Taman Jubli Bukit Aup (Phase I) was completed in 1993 and Phase II in 1997. New Sibu Central Market at Channel Road was completed in 1996. A new market at Grand Height, Jalan Upper Lanang was completed in 1999. SMC moved its headquarters to Wisma Sanyan in 2001.

== List of Chairpersons of the Sibu Municipal Council (SMC) ==
- Ting Lik Hung (1957-1959)
- Ting Chew Huat (1959-1961)
- Kong Sung Seng (1/01/1961 to 30/06/1963)
- Khoo Peng Loong (1963-1971)
- Lai Han Yu (1971-1979)
- Tan Sri Law Hieng Ding (1979-1981)
- Dato Yao Ping Hua (1981-1989)
- Datuk Ting Ing Mieng (1989-1991)
- Kong Sien Han (1991-1999)
- Datuk Robert Lau Hoi Chiew (1999-2005)
- Datuk Tiong Thai King (2005-2019)
- Clarence Ting Ing Horh (2019–present)

== Purpose ==
SMC is responsible for public health and sanitation, waste removal and management, town planning, environmental protection and building control, social and economic development and general maintenance functions of urban infrastructure.

== Administration ==
Administrative area of SMC included Sibu city centre, Sungei Merah Bazaar, extending from east bank of Rajang River to Teku, Ulu Oya, and Salim roads. The area of coverage has increased from 50 km^{2} during the administration of SUDC to 129.5 km^{2} when SUDC was upgraded to SMC.

== SMC public library ==
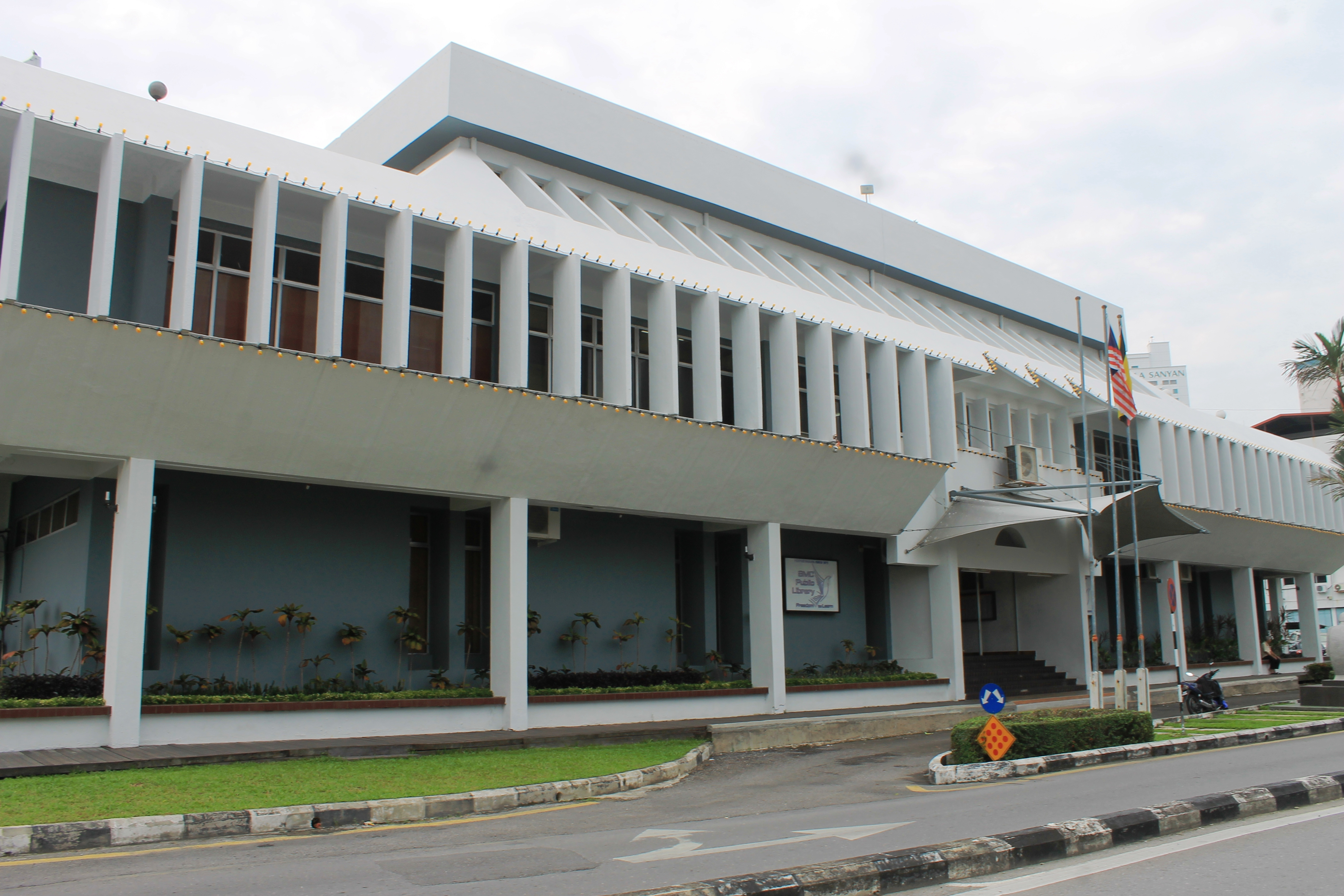
SMC public library

The library was started as a Methodist Missionary Library in the 1950s. It was taken over by SUDC in 1955. It was relocated to SUDC (now SMC town hall) at Wong Nai Siong road from 1962 to 1985. The library was moved to the present location at Keranji road in 1986. In 2014, the library was relaunched with a new logo, mascot, website and also free wi-fi service for its members.

== See also ==
- Sibu Rural District Council (SRDC)
