= Tiong Thai King =

Malaysian politician

Yang Berbahagia Datuk Tiong Thai King PGBK
- 张泰卿

Faction represented in Dewan Rakyat
- 1995–2013: Barisan Nasional

Faction represented in Sarawak State Legislative Assembly
- 2016–2018: Barisan Nasional
- 2018–2021: United Sarawak Party

Other roles
- 2004–2019: Chairman of Sibu Municipal Council

Personal details
- Born: 4 July 1945 (age 80)
- Party: United Sarawak Party (PSB) (2014-2021)
- Relations: Tiong Hiew King (Elder brother)
- Occupation: Politician

Tiong Thai King (simplified Chinese: 张泰卿; traditional Chinese: 張泰卿; pinyin: Zhāng Tàiqīng; born 4 July 1945) is a Malaysian politician who served as Member of the Sarawak State Legislative Assembly (MLA) for Dudong from May 2016 to December 2021 and Member of Parliament (MP) for the Lanang from April 1995 to May 2013. He was a member of the federal and state opposition Parti Sarawak Bersatu (PSB) before he quits politics in 2021. Previously he was a member of the Sarawak United Peoples' Party (SUPP), a component party of the federal and state ruling Gabungan Parti Sarawak (GPS) coalition and a former component party of the federal ruling Barisan Nasional (BN) coalition.

Tiong was elected to Parliament in the 1995 general election. In 2004 he was appointed Chairman of the Sibu Municipal Council. He is also a former Senator. In the 2011 Sarawak election, he was nominated as the candidate for the Dudong constituency, but was defeated by Yap Hoi Liong of the Democratic Action Party (DAP) by 317 votes. He failed to defend his federal parliamentary seat at the 2013 general election, losing to Alice Lau Kiong Yieng of the DAP by 8,630 votes.

However, in the 2016 state election, he contested in the Dudong constituency in Sarawak for the second time as direct BN candidate, and he won the seat this time, with the majority of 2,146 votes, beating the incumbent Yap Hoi Liong of DAP, Mary Ting Yiik Hong of State Reform Party (STAR), and 2 independent candidates, Casper Kayong Umping and Dato Sri Dr. Benny Lee.

Tiong officially resigned from the PSB party, effective 1 December 2021, just around the time of 2021 state election.

== Personal life ==
He is the younger brother of Tiong Hiew King, founding chairman of the Rimbunan Hijau Group, an established multinational timber and logging corporation. After Tiong Hiew King passed away, he takeover his position as Rimbunan Hijau Group Managing Director.

== Election results ==
Parliament of Malaysia
Year	Constituency	Candidate	Votes	Pct	Opponent(s)	Votes	Pct	Ballots cast	Majority	Turnout
1995	P183 Lanang	Tiong Thai King (SUPP)	18,221	53.54%	Wong Sing Nang (DAP)	15,813	46.46%	34,456	2,408	72.79%
1999	P184 Lanang	Tiong Thai King (SUPP)	16,256	63.20%	Wong Ho Leng (DAP)	9,466	36.80%	26,084	6,790	68.32%
2004	P210 Lanang	Tiong Thai King (SUPP)	14,895	59.42%	Wong Kee Woan (DAP)	10,174	40.58%	25,374	4,721	63.28%
2008	P211 Lanang	Tiong Thai King (SUPP)	19,476	57.13%	Wong Kee Woan (DAP)	14,612	42.87%	34,443	4,864	69.54%
2013	P211 Lanang	Tiong Thai King (SUPP)	17,983	40.32%	Alice Lau Kiong Yieng (DAP)	26,613	59.68%	44,956	8,630	78.67%

Sarawak State Legislative Assembly
Year	Constituency	Candidate	Votes	Pct	Opponent(s)	Votes	Pct	Ballots cast	Majority	Turnout
2011	N46 Dudong	Tiong Thai King (SUPP)	9,332	48.72%	Yap Hoi Liong (DAP)	9,649	50.37%	19,470	317	74.17%
2011	N46 Dudong	Tiong Thai King (SUPP)	9,332	48.72%	Apandi Abdul Rani (IND)	174	0.91%	19,470	317	74.17%
2016	N52 Dudong	Tiong Thai King (BN)	9,700	46.36%	Yap Hoi Liong (DAP)	7,554	36.11%	21,183	2,146	72.97%
2016	N52 Dudong	Tiong Thai King (BN)	9,700	46.36%	Lee Chung Fatt (IND)	3,288	15.72%	21,183	2,146	72.97%
2016	N52 Dudong	Tiong Thai King (BN)	9,700	46.36%	Casper Kayong Umping (IND)	228	1.09%	21,183	2,146	72.97%
2016	N52 Dudong	Tiong Thai King (BN)	9,700	46.36%	Ting Yiik Hong (STAR)	152	0.73%	21,183	2,146	72.97%

== Honours ==
- Sarawak
  - Commander of the Order of the Star of Hornbill Sarawak (PGBK) – Datuk (2005)
