= Buniayu Cave =

Cave in West Java, Indonesia

Buniayu Cave is a tourist destination area known for its caves adventure. Located on an area of approximately 10 hectares, Buniayu is located in the village of Kerta Angsana, Sukabumi, West Java, Indonesia.

== Name origin ==
The cave was better known as Cipicung cave because its location is within the area of Cipicung village. It is known as Siluman cave by spelunkers. Since the Perum Perhutani took over the management of this area, on 26 February 1992, the name of the cave was changed to Wana Wisata Buniayu Cave. Buniayu name itself is taken from the Sundanese language which consists of the word "Buni" which means "hidden" and "Ayu" which means "beautiful". Therefore, Buniayu means "hidden beauty".

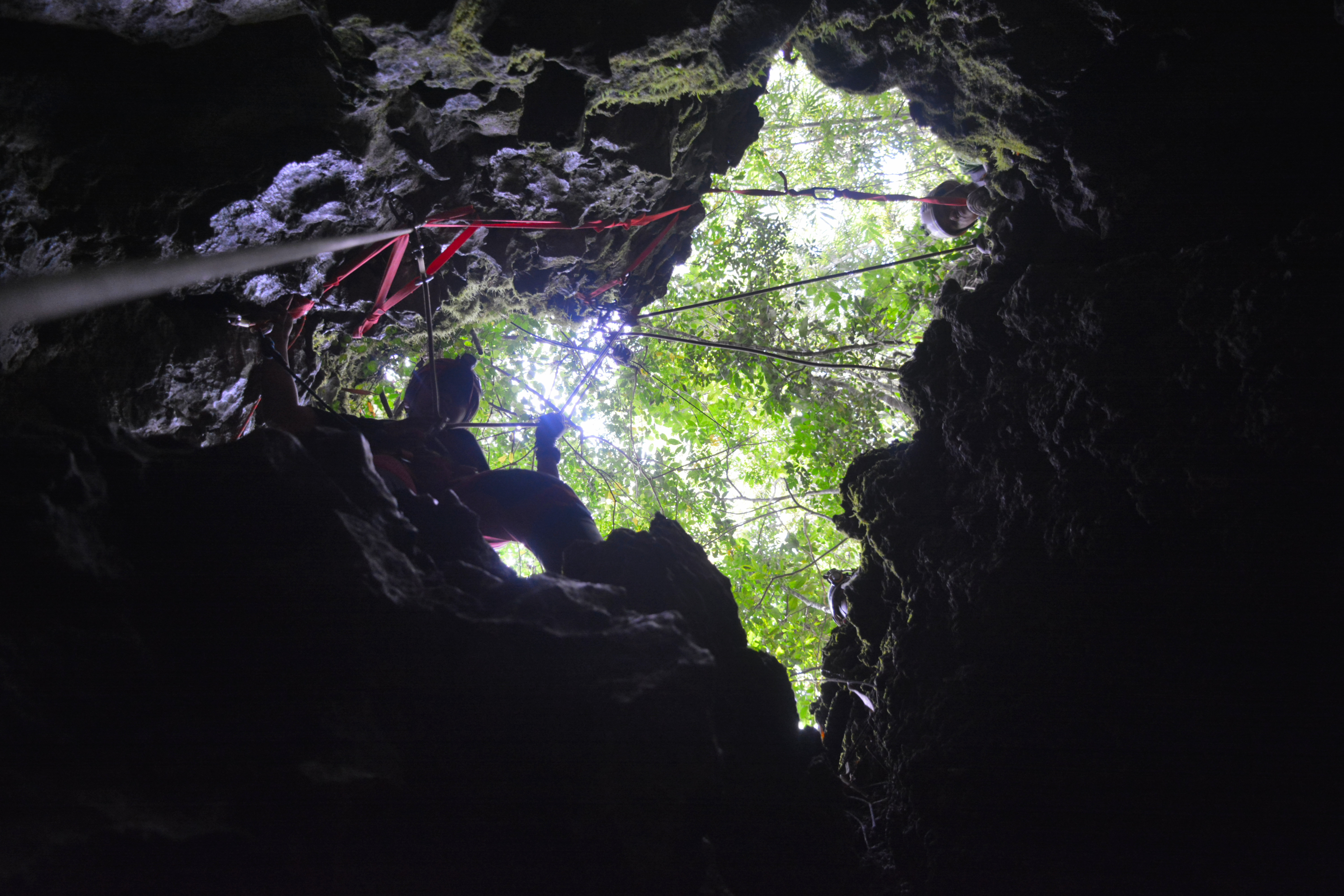
The entrance to Kerek Cave

== History ==
Since 1992, the resort is operated by Perum Perhutani Unit III Jawa Barat (West Java) and Banten. There are two caves in the area, namely Goa Angin (Wind Cave) and Goa Kerek (Kerek Cave). Goa Angin or Wind Cave is used for general interest tourism, while Goa Kerek is used for special interest tourism.

== Wind Cave ==
Wind Cave is a horizontal cave with the approximate distance around 300 meters or around 1.5 – 2 hours (backtrack). The cave is open to public because, to enter, the visitor would not require special equipment.

=== Tunnel ===
- Depth of vertical hole: Non vertical
- Area of chamber (room): Varies at some point
- Horizontal alley length: ± 300 m (travel time 2 hours round-trip)
- Hallway width: 1 – 20 meters
- Ceiling height: 2 – 25 meters on average from the cave floor

=== Waters ===
- River width: 1 – 2 meters
- River water level altitude: 0.5 – 3 meters (high intensity rainfall), 15 cm (dry)
- Diameter of the lake: None
- Depth of lake: None
- Waterfall height: None

=== Types of ornaments ===
- Stalactite, shaped like a spear
- Stalagmites, located always under the stalactites
- Drapery, shaped like a shark's fin
- Gourdam (baby gourdam, micro gourd), dome-shaped with a surface resembling a patch of rice fields
- Canopy, shaped like an umbrella
- Flow stone, shaped like a frozen waterfall
- Column, shaped like a pillar (originally from stalactite and stalagmite that have been fused)

=== Types of biota ===
- Crickets bat (megachiroptra)
- Spider
- Fish
- Shrimp
- Lizard
- Swallow (Collocalia)

=== General condition of the tunnel ===
- Wet with 60 – 70% humidity and temperature around 22 – 25 °C
- Climb angle between 30 ° - 45

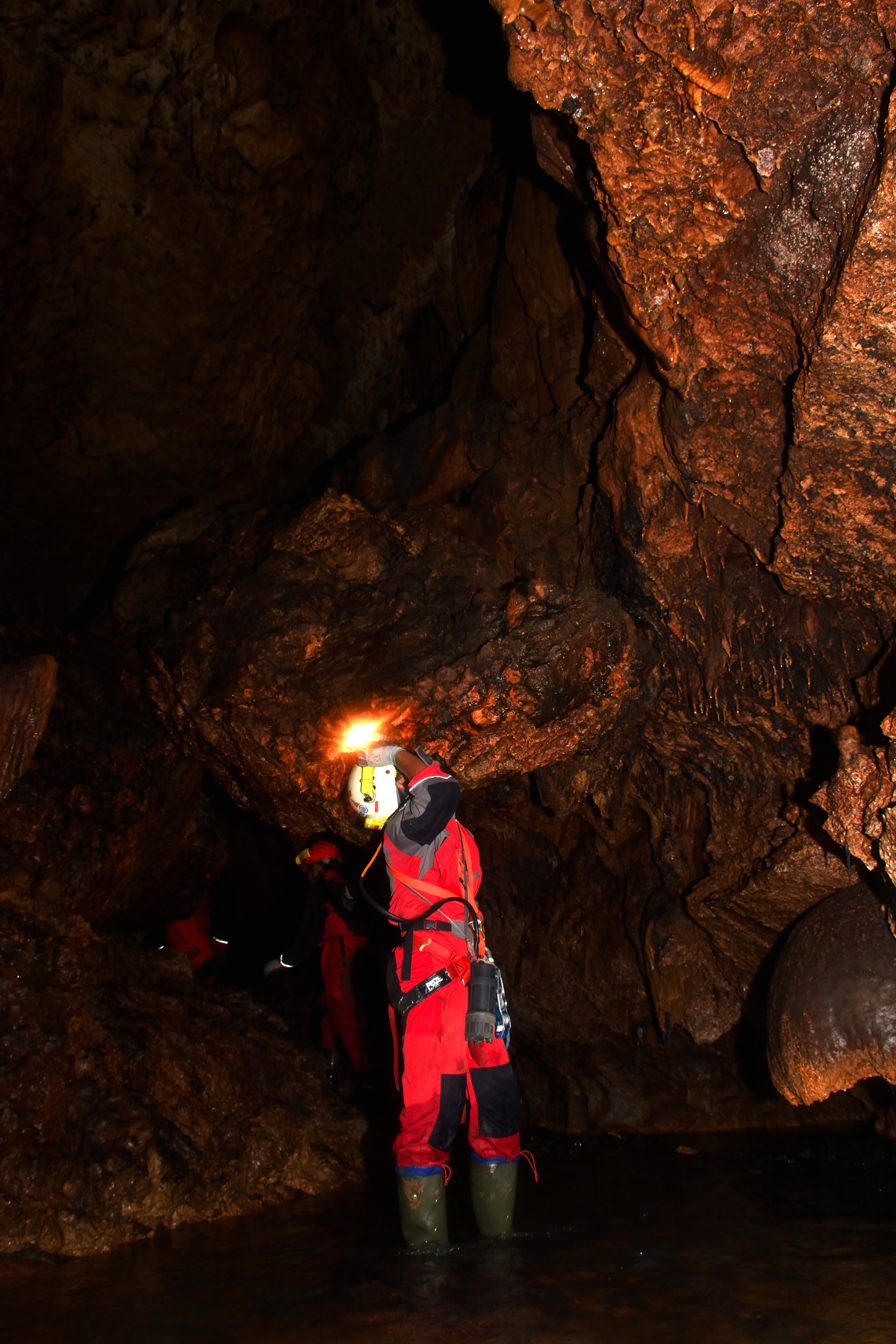
The chamber inside Kerek Cave

== Kerek Cave ==
To enter Kerek Cave, visitors will need special equipment. Kerek Cave is a cave with vertical entrance, around 30 meters tall. The distance from the entrance of the cave to the exit is around 2.5 kilometers or around 5 – 6 hours. With the number of cave floors collapsed as a result of water erosion, this cave is categorized as a cave with medium adventure level with quite high level of risk. Therefore, special equipment and professional guides are required. For that reason, this cave is only opened for visitors with special interest.

=== Tunnel ===
- Depth of vertical hole: ± 32 meters (entrance)
- Area of chamber (room): ± 1½ of soccer field
- Horizontal alley length: ± 2.5 km (travel time 5 – 7 hours to the horizontal exit hole)
- Hallway width: 1 – 20 meters
- Ceiling height: 2 – 35 meters on average from the cave floor

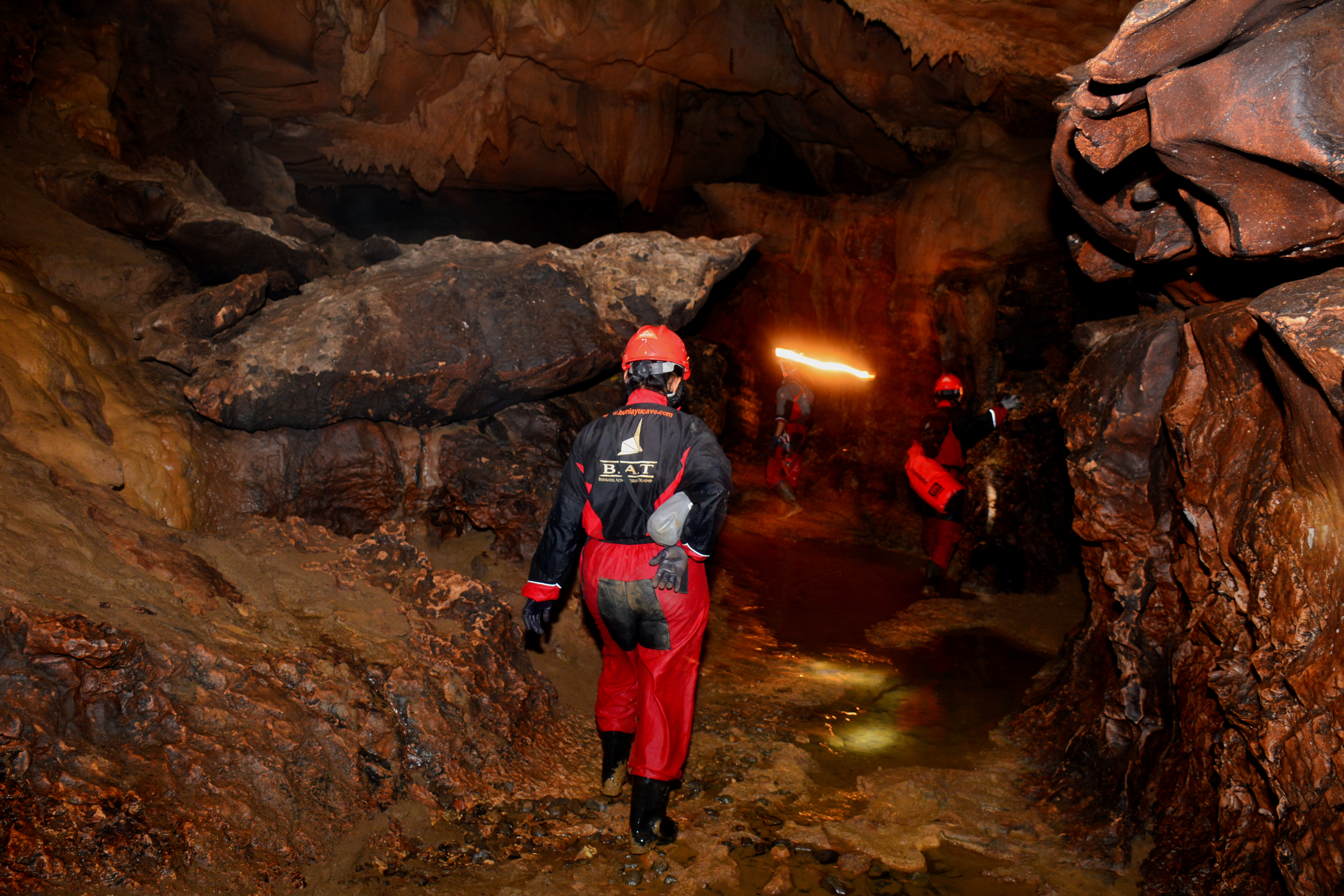
The condition inside Kerek Cave

=== Waters ===
- River width: 1 – 2 meters
- Surface height: 50 – 90 cm (high intensity rainfall), 15 cm (dry)
- Diameter of the lake: ± 10 meters
- The depth of the lake: ± 5 – 7 meters
- The height of the waterfall: ± 15 meters

=== Types of ornaments ===
- Stalactite, shaped like a spear
- Stalagmites, located always under the stalactites
- Drapery, shaped like a shark's fin
- Gourdam (baby gourdam, micro gourd), dome-shaped with a surface resembling a patch of rice fields
- Canopy, shaped like an umbrella
- Flow stone, shaped like a frozen waterfall
- Column, shaped like a pillar (originally from stalactite and stalagmite that have been fused)

=== Type of biota ===
- Crickets
- Bat (megachiroptra)
- Spider
- Fish
- Shrimp
- Lizard
- Swallow (Collocalia)

=== General condition of the tunnel ===
- Wet with 60 – 70% humidity and temperature around 22 – 25 °C
- Climb angle between 40 ° - 50 °

== Other caves ==
In addition to Wind and Kerek Cave, there are also several other caves in the area

- Cipicung Cave (± 3300 m long)
- Bibijilan Cave (± 717 m long)
- Adni Cave (± 635 m long)
- Nyangkut Cave (± 390 m long)
- Kubang Lanang Cave (± 302 m long)
- Goa Tanpa Nama (Unnamed Cave) (± 400 m long)
- Karsim Cave
- Bisoro Cave
- Idin Cave
- Gede Cave
- Kole Cave
