= National Provident Fund =

National Provident Fund may refer to one of the following:

- National Superannuation Fund of Papua New Guinea, formerly known as the National Provident Fund (NPF)
- Vanuatu National Provident Fund
