= Alice Lau =

Malaysian politician and pharmacist

Yang Berhormat Puan Alice Lau Kiong Yieng MP
- 刘强燕
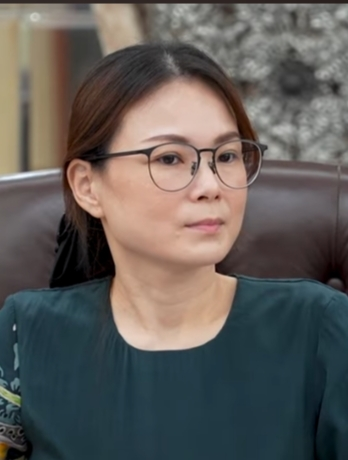

Deputy Speaker of the Dewan Rakyat II
- Incumbent
- Assumed office 19 December 2022 Serving with Ramli Mohd Nor
- Monarchs: Abdullah (2022–2024); Ibrahim Iskandar (since 2024)
- Prime Minister: Anwar Ibrahim
- Speaker: Johari Abdul
- Preceded by: Azalina Othman Said
- Constituency: Lanang

Chairperson of the National Institute of Occupational Safety and Health
- In office 1 October 2019 – 31 March 2020
- Monarch: Abdullah
- Prime Minister: Mahathir Mohamad
- Minister: M. Kulasegaran
- Preceded by: Lee Lam Thye
- Succeeded by: Wilson Ugak Kumbong

Assistant International Secretary of the Democratic Action Party
- Incumbent
- Assumed office 16 March 2025
- Secretary-General: Anthony Loke Siew Fook
- International Secretary: Kasthuriraani Patto
- Preceded by: Kasthuriraani Patto

Member of the Malaysian Parliament for Lanang
- Incumbent
- Assumed office 5 May 2013
- Preceded by: Tiong Thai King (BN–SUPP)
- Majority: 8,630 (2013); 14,546 (2018); 11,544 (2022)

Personal details
- Pronunciation: pinyin: Liú Qiángyàn
- Born: Alice Lau Kiong Yieng; 30 July 1981 (age 45) Sibu, Sibu Division, Sarawak, Malaysia
- Citizenship: Malaysian
- Party: Democratic Action Party (DAP) (since 2009)
- Other political affiliations: Pakatan Rakyat (PR) (2009–2015); Pakatan Harapan (PH) (since 2015)
- Spouse: Loo Chee Wee (罗智伟) (m. 2014)
- Parent: Lau Cheng Kiong (father)
- Education: International Medical University; University of Strathclyde (MPharm)
- Occupation: Politician
- Profession: Pharmacist
- Salary: RM192,000 per annum

Alice Lau Kiong Yieng (born 30 July 1981; simplified Chinese: 刘强燕; traditional Chinese: 劉強燕; pinyin: Liú Qiángyàn) is a Malaysian politician and pharmacist who has served as the Deputy Speaker of the Dewan Rakyat II under Speaker Johari Abdul since December 2022 and the Member of Parliament (MP) for Lanang since May 2013. She served as Chairperson of the National Institute of Occupational Safety and Health (NIOSH) from October 2019 to March 2020. She is a member of the Democratic Action Party (DAP), a component party of the Pakatan Harapan (PH) and formerly Pakatan Rakyat (PR) coalitions. She has served as the Assistant International Secretary of DAP since March 2025 and is the State Deputy Chairperson of DAP of Sarawak.

== Education ==
A pharmacist by profession, Lau received her Master of Pharmacy (MPharm) from University of Strathclyde.

== Political career ==
Lau joined DAP in 2009.

A native of Sibu, Lau first contested for the Bawang Assan seat in the Sarawak State Assembly during the 2011 Sarawak state election, but was defeated by six-term incumbent Member of Legislative Assembly (MLA) Wong Soon Koh.

In the 2013 Malaysian general election, Lau was nominated by the DAP to contest for Lanang in Sibu. She defeated five-term incumbent Tiong Thai King with a majority of 8,630 votes, or 19.2% of the votes, becoming the first female opposition MP elected from Sarawak.

Lau successfully defended her Lanang parliamentary seat during the historic 2018 Malaysian general election with an increased majority over candidates from the Sarawak United Peoples' Party (SUPP) and Justices of Peace Coalition People's Party (PEACE).

In July 2021, Alice distributed food aid to 1,540 families in the Lanang constituency during the Covid-19 pandemic.

== Chairperson of NIOSH ==
In October 2019, Lau was appointed as chairperson of the board of directors of the Malaysian National Institute of Occupational Safety and Health (NIOSH) succeeding Lee Lam Thye who had served in the capacity for 25 years. During her tenure as the chairperson of NIOSH, the management team proposed tax relief for imported personal protective equipment (PPE) during the Covid-19 pandemic, lobbied the government for more women to be trained in safety and health courses, more opportunities for east Malaysians and B40 to uprgrade their skills in safety and health for better employment. Her tenure was terminated by the end of March 2020 following events of the 2020 Malaysian political crisis which saw the Alliance of Hope (PH) coalition losing its grip on power.

== Issues raised ==
In July 2019, Alice Lau had asked in parliament on what actions the federal government would take against those who called for secession of Sarawak from Malaysia and if the secession is permissible by the Malaysian federal constitution and 1963 Malaysian agreement. Prime minister Mahathir replied that action would only be taken under the Sedition Act 1948 against Sarawak’s secessionists if they jeopardised public order and security. Sarawak United Peoples' Party (SUPP) then accused her of betraying the interests of Sarawakians. Alice Lau defended that she was merely raising the question on the legality Sarawak being seceded from Malaysia.

In March 2019, Alice questioned the Ministry of Health on the timing to station oncology specialists and other medical specialists in Sibu Hospital. Since 2022, Alice has been advocating for a heart centre and later a cancer centre to be built in Sibu.

== Election results ==
Parliament of Malaysia
Year	Constituency	Candidate	Votes	Pct	Opponent(s)	Votes	Pct	Ballots cast	Majority	Turnout
2013	P211 Lanang	Alice Lau Kiong Yieng (DAP)	26,613	59.68%	Tiong Thai King (SUPP)	17,983	40.32%	44,956	8,630	78.67%
2018	P211 Lanang	Alice Lau Kiong Yieng (DAP)	29,905	65.16%	Kong Sien Chiu (SUPP)	15,359	33.47%	46,419	14,546	74.90%
2018	P211 Lanang	Alice Lau Kiong Yieng (DAP)	29,905	65.16%	Priscilla Lau (PEACE)	628	1.37%	46,419	14,546	74.90%
2022	P211 Lanang	Alice Lau Kiong Yieng (DAP)	30,120	56.89%	Wong Ching Yong (SUPP)	18,576	35.08%	53,972	11,544	60.61%
2022	P211 Lanang	Alice Lau Kiong Yieng (DAP)	30,120	56.89%	Priscilla Lau (PSB)	3,663	6.92%	53,972	11,544	60.61%
2022	P211 Lanang	Alice Lau Kiong Yieng (DAP)	30,120	56.89%	Wong Tiing Kiong (IND)	587	1.11%	53,972	11,544	60.61%

Sarawak State Legislative Assembly
Year	Constituency	Candidate	Votes	Pct	Opponent(s)	Votes	Pct	Ballots cast	Majority	Turnout
2011	N47 Bawang Assan	Alice Lau Kiong Yieng (DAP)	5,508	42.95%	Wong Soon Koh (SUPP)	7,316	57.05%	12,936	1,808	77.26%

== Personal life ==
Lau's father, Lau Cheng Kiong, was the chairman of Pelawan branch of the Sarawak Progressive Democratic Party (SPDP), a component of the Barisan Nasional (BN) government coalition.

Lau is married to a businessman from Malacca, Loo Chee Wee. The couple have a son who was born on 9 April 2016.

On 27 May 2021, it was reported that she had tested positive for COVID-19 and undergoing quarantine at a Ministry of Health (KKM) centre in Sibu.

== Honours ==
=== Honours of Malaysia ===
- Malaysia
  - Recipient of the 17th Yang di-Pertuan Agong Installation Medal (2024)

== See also ==
- Lanang (federal constituency)

Parliament of Malaysia
Preceded by Tiong Thai King	Member of Parliament for Lanang; Since 2013	Incumbent
Government offices
Preceded by Lee Lam Thye	Chairperson of National Institute of Occupational Safety and Health (Malaysia); 2019–2020	Succeeded by Wilson Ugak Kumbong
