= Tiong Hiew King =

Malaysian businessman (1934–2025)

Yang Berbahagia Tan Sri Datuk Tiong Hiew King KBE PSM PGBK
- 张晓卿
- Born: 18 March 1934; Sibu, Raj of Sarawak (now Sarawak, Malaysia)
- Died: 11 November 2025 (aged 91); Sibu, Sarawak, Malaysia
- Occupations: Executive chairman, Rimbunan Hijau

Tiong Hiew King

Chinese name
- Traditional Chinese: 張曉卿
- Simplified Chinese: 张晓卿
- Hanyu Pinyin: Zhāng Xiǎoqīng
- Jyutping: Zoeng1 Hiu2 Hing1
- Hokkien POJ: Tiuⁿ Hiáu-kheng
- Tâi-lô: Tiunn Hiáu-khing
- Fuzhou BUC: Diŏng Hiēu-kĭng

Tan Sri Datuk Tiong Hiew King PSM PGBK (simplified Chinese: 张晓卿; traditional Chinese: 張曉卿; pinyin: Zhāng Xiǎoqīng; Jyutping: Zoeng1 Hiu2 Hing1; Pe̍h-ōe-jī: Tiuⁿ Hiáu-kheng; Hokchew Romanized: Diŏng Hiēu-kĭng; 18 March 1934 – 11 November 2025) was a Malaysian businessman who was the founder and chairman of the Rimbunan Hijau Group, a timber company founded in 1975. Its overseas timber operations in Papua New Guinea is the largest in that country. He also had interests in logging operations in Russia.

Tan Sri Datuk Tiong resided in Sibu, a town in Sarawak, of Borneo island that is part of Malaysia. As of March 2018, with a net worth of about US$1.1 billion, Tiong was ranked by Forbes as the 1,999th richest person in the world.

== Family ==
Tiong's family is the second largest private landowner in New Zealand. To be confirmed.

== Influence in media ==
Tiong's Rimbunan Hijau Group operates Sin Chew Daily and Guang Ming Daily, two of the major Chinese national dailies in Malaysia. They also operate The National Daily in Papua New Guinea and Ming Pao Holdings Ltd in Hong Kong. He was forging a global Chinese publishing group with his Ming Pao Enterprises; Ming Pao newspaper is also available in San Francisco, New York, Vancouver and Toronto.

Media Chinese International Limited (MCIL) is the holding company for all Tiong's media assets formed after the merger of Ming Pao Enterprise Corporation Limited, Sin Chew Media Corporation Berhad and Nanyang Press Holdings Berhad.

In 2018, Tiong stepped down from the position of executive chairman of MCIL to take up a non-executive, non-independent directorship in the group.

== Influence in local politics ==
Back home in Sibu, his family are members of the ruling Sarawak United People's Party (SUPP), a major party of the ruling coalition government in Sarawak. Tiong's younger brother Tiong Thai King has been the Member of Parliament of the Lanang Parliamentary Constituency in Sibu from 1995 to 2013.

== Knighthood controversy ==
In 2009, Tiong was awarded an honorary knighthood of the Order of the British Empire. Following his knighting, environmental groups around the world called for him to be stripped of his title, claiming that his success was built on the destruction of tropical forests by his company, Rimbunan Hijau.

== Illness and death ==
In April 2017, Tiong's family confirmed that he was hospitalised after suffering a stroke.

Tiong died in Sibu, Sarawak on 11 November 2025, at the age of 91.

== Honours ==
=== Honours of Malaysia ===
- Malaysia
  - Commander of the Order of Loyalty to the Crown of Malaysia (PSM) – Tan Sri (1999)
- Sarawak
  - Commander of the Order of the Star of Hornbill Sarawak (PGBK) – Datuk (1990)

=== Foreign honours ===
- United Kingdom
  - Honorary Knight Commander of the Order of the British Empire (KBE)
