= Lanang =

Federal constituency of Sarawak, Malaysia

Lanang (P211)
Sarawak constituency

Federal constituency
- Legislature: Dewan Rakyat
- MP: Alice Lau Kiong Yieng; PH
- Constituency created: 1987
- First contested: 1990
- Last contested: 2022

Demographics
- Population (2020): 104,930
- Electors (2022): 87,356
- Area (km²): 722
- Pop. density (per km²): 145.3

Lanang is a federal constituency in Sibu Division (Sibu District), Sarawak, Malaysia, that has been represented in the Dewan Rakyat since 1990.

The federal constituency was created in the 1987 redistribution and is mandated to return a single member to the Dewan Rakyat under the first past the post voting system.

== Demographics ==
https://ge15.orientaldaily.com.my/seats/sarawak/p

Ethnic breakdown of Lanang's electorate as of 2022
1. Chinese (65.1%)
2. Sarawak bumiputera (26.9%)
3. Malay-Muslim bumiputera (7.20%)
4. Other ethnicities (0.80%)

As of 2020, Lanang has a population of 104,930 people.

Age breakdown of Lanang's electorate as of 2022
1. 18-20 (5.99%)
2. 21-29 (21.1%)
3. 30-39 (19.8%)
4. 40-49 (17.2%)
5. 50-59 (15.1%)
6. 60-69 (12.1%)
7. 70-79 (6.09%)
8. 80-89 (1.99%)
9. above 90 (0.63%)
Gender breakdown of Lanang's electorate as of 2022
1. Male (49.3%)
2. Female (50.7%)

== History ==
=== Polling districts ===
According to the gazette issued on 31 October 2022, the Lanang constituency has a total of 26 polling districts.

State constituency	Polling Districts	Code	Location
Bukit Assek (N51)	Tiong Hua	211/51/01	SK Perbandaran Sibu No.4 Jln. Oya
Bukit Assek (N51)	Tong Sang	211/51/02	SJK (C) Sacred Heart Chinese Jln. Bukit Assek
Bukit Assek (N51)	Keladi	211/51/03	SJK (C) Hang Kwong; SK Ng. Salim; SJK (C) Sung Sang; SMK Bukit Assek
Bukit Assek (N51)	Kapor Lima	211/51/04	SJK (C) Chung Sing
Bukit Assek (N51)	Lembangan	211/51/05	SK St. Rita
Bukit Assek (N51)	Uk Daik	211/51/06	SMK Katolik
Bukit Assek (N51)	Hardin	211/51/07	SJK (C) Uk Daik
Bukit Assek (N51)	Lai Chee	211/51/08	SMK St Elizabeth
Bukit Assek (N51)	Merlin	211/51/09	SMK St Elizabeth
Bukit Assek (N51)	Hua Kiew	211/51/10	SMK Sacred Heart
Bukit Assek (N51)	Hin Yu	211/51/11	SMK Methodist
Bukit Assek (N51)	Layang-Layang	211/51/12	SK Sacred Heart
Bukit Assek (N51)	Manggis	211/51/13	SK Sacred Heart
Bukit Assek (N51)	Maling	211/51/14	SMK Sacred Heart
Dudong (N52)	Assan	211/52/01	SK Batu Wong; SK Ng. Asaan; SK Tanjong Latap; SJK (C) Sing Ming Kerto
Dudong (N52)	Naman	211/52/02	SK Sg. Naman; SK Ulu Sg. Naman; SK Ulu Durin Kiba
Dudong (N52)	Pak	211/52/03	SK Sg. Durin; SJK (C) Hing Ung Durin; SK Ng. Pak; SK Sg. Nibong
Dudong (N52)	Dudong	211/52/04	SJK (C) Yong Shing Stabau; SJK (C) Kwong Kok Salim
Dudong (N52)	Salim	211/52/05	SMK Bukit Lima
Dudong (N52)	Lanang	211/52/06	SMJK Chung Hua
Dudong (N52)	Aik Dee	211/52/07	SK Perbandaran Sibu No. 2
Dudong (N52)	Menyan	211/52/08	SK Sg. Menyan; SK Ulu Sg. Sengan; SJK (C) Sang Ming
Dudong (N52)	Sibu Jaya	211/52/09	SK Ulu Sg. Salim; SJK (C) Thian Hua
Dudong (N52)	Lada	211/52/10	SJK (C) Thai Kwang
Dudong (N52)	Usaha Jaya	211/52/11	SK Sentosa
Dudong (N52)	Mantis	211/52/12	SK SEDC

=== Representation history ===
Members of Parliament for Lanang
Parliament	No	Years	Member	Party	Vote Share
Constituency created from Sibu and Rajang
8th	P171	1990–1995	Wong Sing Nang (黄新楠)	GR (DAP)	15,405; 57.40%
9th	P183	1995–1999	Tiong Thai King (张泰卿)	BN (SUPP)	18,221; 53.54%
10th	P184	1999–2004	Tiong Thai King (张泰卿)	BN (SUPP)	16,256; 63.20%
11th	P210	2004–2008	Tiong Thai King (张泰卿)	BN (SUPP)	14,895; 59.42%
12th	P211	2008–2013	Tiong Thai King (张泰卿)	BN (SUPP)	19,476; 57.13%
13th	P211	2013-2018	Alice Lau Kiong Yieng (刘强燕)	PR (DAP)	26,613; 59.68%
14th	P211	2018-2022	Alice Lau Kiong Yieng (刘强燕)	PH (DAP)	29,905; 65.16%
15th	P211	2022–present	Alice Lau Kiong Yieng (刘强燕)	PH (DAP)	30,120; 56.89%

=== State constituency ===
Parliamentary constituency	State constituency					
Parliamentary constituency	1969–1978	1978–1990	1990–1999	1999–2008	2008–2016	2016−present
Lanang			Bukit Assek			
Lanang			Dudong			

=== Historical boundaries ===
State Constituency	Area			
State Constituency	1987	1996	2005	2015
Bukit Assek	Jalan Oya; Jalan Pedada; Jalan Pulau; Jalan Tong Sang; Persiaran Brooke	Bukit Assek; Jalan Oya; Lembangan; Maling; Tanjung Latap		
Dudong	Dudong; Lanang; Li Hua; Salim; Stabau	Dudong; Lanang; Salim; Sibu Jaya; Stabau		

=== Current state assembly members ===
No.	State Constituency	Member	Party (coalition)
N51	Bukit Assek	Chieng Jin Ek	GPS (SUPP)
N52	Dudong	Tiong King Sing	GPS (PDP)

=== Local governments & postcodes ===
No.	State Constituency	Local Government	Postcode
N51	Bukit Assek	Sibu Municipal Council	96000 Sibu; 96500 Bintangor; 96600 Julau; 96700 Kanowit
N52	Dudong	Sibu Municipal Council (Lanang area); Sibu Rural District Council	96000 Sibu; 96500 Bintangor; 96600 Julau; 96700 Kanowit

== Election results ==
Malaysian general election, 2022: Lanang
Party	Candidate	Votes	%	∆%
DAP	Alice Lau Kiong Yieng	30,120	56.89	▼8.27
GPS	Wong Ching Yong	18,576	35.08	▲35.08
PSB	Priscilla Lau	3,663	6.92	▲6.92
Independent	Wong Tiing Kiong	587	1.11	▲1.11
Total valid votes		52,946	100.00	
Total rejected ballots		865		
Unreturned ballots		161		
Turnout		53,972	60.61	▼14.29
Registered electors		87,356		
Majority		11,544	21.81	▼9.89
DAP hold		Swing		
Source(s) https://lom.agc.gov.my/ilims/upload/portal/akta/outputp/1753265/PARLIMEN%20SARAWAK%20(PUB%20620).pdf

Malaysian general election, 2018: Lanang
Party	Candidate	Votes	%	∆%
DAP	Alice Lau Kiong Yieng	29,905	65.16	▲5.48
BN	Kong Sien Chiu	15,359	33.47	▼6.85
PEACE	Priscilla Lau	628	1.37	▲1.37
Total valid votes		45,892	100.00	
Total rejected ballots		295		
Unreturned ballots		232		
Turnout		46,419	74.90	▼3.77
Registered electors		61,973		
Majority		14,546	31.70	▲12.34
DAP hold		Swing		{{{2}}}
Source(s) "His Majesty's Government Gazette - Notice of Contested Election, Parliament for the State of Sarawak [P.U. (B) 247/2018]" (PDF). Attorney General's Chambers of Malaysia. 3 May 2018. "Federal Government Gazette - Results of Contested Election and Statements of the Poll after the Official Addition of Votes, Parliamentary Constituencies for the State of Sarawak [P.U. (B) 321/2018]" (PDF). Attorney General's Chambers of Malaysia. 28 May 2018. Archived from the original (PDF) on 2019-12-29.

Malaysian general election, 2013: Lanang
Party	Candidate	Votes	%	∆%
DAP	Alice Lau Kiong Yieng	26,613	59.68	▲16.81
BN	Tiong Thai King	17,983	40.32	▼16.81
Total valid votes		44,596	100.00	
Total rejected ballots		304		
Unreturned ballots		56		
Turnout		44,956	78.67	▲9.13
Registered electors		57,143		
Majority		8,630	19.36	▲5.10
DAP gain from BN		Swing		?
Source(s) "Federal Government Gazette - Notice of Contested Election, Parliament for the State of Sarawak [P.U. (B) 184/2013]" (PDF). Attorney General's Chambers of Malaysia. 26 April 2013. "Federal Government Gazette - Results of Contested Election and Statements of the Poll after the Official Addition of Votes, Parliamentary Constituencies for the State of Sarawak [P.U. (B) 225/2013]" (PDF). Attorney General's Chambers of Malaysia. 22 May 2013. Archived from the original (PDF) on 2018-09-30.

Malaysian general election, 2008: Lanang
Party	Candidate	Votes	%	∆%
BN	Tiong Thai King	19,476	57.13	▼2.29
DAP	Wong Kee Woan	14,612	42.87	▲2.29
Total valid votes		34,088	100.00	
Total rejected ballots		253		
Unreturned ballots		102		
Turnout		34,443	69.54	▲6.26
Registered electors		49,530		
Majority		4,864	14.26	▼4.58
BN hold		Swing		

Malaysian general election, 2004: Lanang
Party	Candidate	Votes	%	∆%
BN	Tiong Thai King	14,895	59.42	▼3.78
DAP	Wong Kee Woan	10,174	40.58	▲3.78
Total valid votes		25,069	100.00	
Total rejected ballots		252		
Unreturned ballots		53		
Turnout		25,374	63.28	▼5.04
Registered electors		40,100		
Majority		4,721	18.84	▼7.56
BN hold		Swing		

Malaysian general election, 1999: Lanang
Party	Candidate	Votes	%	∆%
BN	Tiong Thai King	16,256	63.20	▲9.66
DAP	Wong Ho Leng	9,466	36.80	▼9.66
Total valid votes		25,722	100.00	
Total rejected ballots		292		
Unreturned ballots		70		
Turnout		26,084	68.32	▲4.47
Registered electors		38,177		
Majority		6,790	26.40	▲19.32
BN hold		Swing		

Malaysian general election, 1995: Lanang
Party	Candidate	Votes	%	∆%
BN	Tiong Thai King	18,221	53.54	▲10.94
DAP	Wong Sing Nang	15,813	46.46	▼10.94
Total valid votes		34,034	100.00	
Total rejected ballots		355		
Unreturned ballots		67		
Turnout		34,456	72.79	▲3.07
Registered electors		47,334		
Majority		2,408	7.08	▼7.72
BN gain from DAP		Swing		?

Malaysian general election, 1990: Lanang
Party	Candidate	Votes	%
DAP	Wong Sing Nang	15,405	57.40
BN	Tieu Sung Seng	11,432	42.60
Total valid votes		26,837	100.00
Total rejected ballots		213	
Unreturned ballots		0	
Turnout		27,050	69.22
Registered electors		39,078	
Majority		3,973	14.80
This was a new constituency created.
