= National Superannuation Fund =

The National Superannuation Fund (NASFUND) of Papua New Guinea (PNG) was established in May 2002, as the successor entity to the National Provident Fund (NPF). It is the largest private sector superannuation fund in PNG. In 2016, NASFUND reported net assets of PGK4.22 billion, representing a 28% growth on 2015.

Compulsory superannuation contributions in PNG were introduced in 1982. Employees are required to contribute a minimum of 6% of their salary to a superannuation fund and employers of over 15 persons are required to contribute 8.4%.

The chief executive officer of NASFUND is Ian Tarutia OBE. The fund is supervised by a board of nine directors, which is chaired by Hulala Tokome. Three of the directors are independent and six are representatives of the seven shareholding bodies:

- Employers Federation of PNG;
- Manufacturers Council of PNG;
- Rural Industries Council of PNG;
- Chamber of Mining & Petroleum;
- PNG Chamber of Commerce;
- PNG Banks & Financial Institutions Workers Union; and
- PNG Trade Union Congress.

The investment functions of NASFUND are outsourced to BSP Capital (BCAP), with fund administration managed by Kina Investments and Superannuation Services (KISS).

== The National Provident Fund (NPF) ==
The National Provident Fund (NPF) of Papua New Guinea was established in 1980. However, following severe financial losses in the 1990s as a result of fraud, corruption and mismanagement, the NPF was privatised in 2002 and its assets divested to NASFUND.

=== Financial Concerns and Restructuring ===
In the late 1990s concerns were raised about NPF's financial liabilities given its exposure to the PNG government, real estate and minerals as well as several allegations of fraud and mis-management. Between 1996 and 1997, the NPF had increased its debt by approving illegal loans from both domestic and foreign commercial banks as well as engaging in two fraudulent projects; the attempted purchase of the Waigani land and the construction of the NPF tower, which further contributed to its losses.

Subsequently in early 2000, NPF fund managers announced a write down of 50 percent in all member contributions made before December 1999, equating to almost PGK114 million. However, a special audit report commissioned into the NPF revealed that the total losses were actually in excess of PGK155 million. As a result of these findings the government requested a formal Commission of Inquiry into the financial dealings of the NPF and the allegations of fraud.

A number of measures were introduced to curb the NPF's losses through the National Provident Fund (Financial Reconstruction) Act 2000, which included the allocation of a PGK1 million annual grant.

== Commission of Inquiry into Frauds ==
The Commission of Inquiry into the NPF was established in April 2000, with wide terms of reference, to investigate all the equity investments and purchases of the NPF, as well as the allegations of fraud and mismanagement, after the findings of the special audit report were delivered. The Commission was chaired by former National and Supreme Court Judge, Tos Barnett, who had previously chaired the government inquiry into the Papua New Guinea Forestry Authority. Barnett was assisted by commissioners Donald Manoa and Lady Wilhelmina Siaguru.

The Commission, which reported its findings in November 2002, found that a number of NPF's senior officers had been in breach of duty and had, in some instances, committed criminal offences.

=== Waigani Land Fraud ===
The Commission of Inquiry reported that in 1999 NPF Chairman, Jimmy Maladina had influenced the NPF to purchase a piece of land in Waigani, which he secretly held an interest in, at an exorbitantly inflated price.

Maladina had acquired the lease for the Waigani land in 1997, via his company Waim No.92 Pty Ltd, at a reduced price of PGK1.4 million, instead of the market value of PGK2.87 million. The Commission found that Maladina negotiated this reduction by bribing the chairman of the Lands Board, Ralph Guise, and the Lands Minister, Viviso Seravo.

Following his appointment as Chairman of NPF in January 1999, Maladina with NPF's Legal Advisor, Herman Leahy, arranged for NPF to purchase the rights to the Waigani Land, by purchasing a 100 percent shareholding in Waim No.92 for an inflated price of PGK10 million. Maladina had not declared that he held an interest in Waim No.92.

However, when news of the proposed acquisition was published in the national media, the ensuing outcry against the exorbitant price led Prime Minister Sir William Skate, to force NPF's withdrawal from the purchase.

=== NPF Tower Fraud ===
The Commission of Inquiry also found that Jimmy Maladina, Herman Leahy and Peter O'Neill had profited by PGK2.5 million in a fraudulent scheme involving Japanese construction firm, Kumagai Gumi.

Kumagai Gumi was contracted by NPF to build what is now known as the Deloitte Tower in Port Morseby, in 1997. The project was beset by delays and overran its initial schedule, which when coupled with the devaluing of the Kina in 1998 and 1999, reduced the profitability of the project for Kumagai Gumi and led it to register a devaluation claim against NPF.

Maladina agreed with Kumagai general manager, Shuichi Taniguchi, that he would ensure that NPF pay out a PGK5.8 devaluation settlement provided that PGK2.5 million of this then be paid to Maladina, by way of commission. The monies were paid as agreed and the PGK2.5 million was shared between Maladina, O'Neill and Leahy.

The Deloitte Tower is now owned by NASFUND and was valued at PGK108 million in 2010.

=== Referrals by the Commission of Inquiry ===
As a result of the Inquiry, Maladina was referred to the Commissioner of Police, but fled to Australia to avoid arrest. The government of PNG applied for the extradition of Maladina from Australia, but he returned to PNG voluntarily. Maladina was subsequently found guilty of misappropriation and sentenced to 8 years in prison (see State v Maladina [2015] PGNC 146; N6049). This custodial sentence was suspended by the court.

The Commission also referred then Treasurer Peter O'Neill to the Commissioner of Police for his involvement in both the NPF Tower fraud and the Waigani land case. O'Neill was brought before the Waigani Committal Court in 2005 and charged with misappropriation, but the charges were dropped due to insufficient evidence.
