= Deforestation in Papua New Guinea =

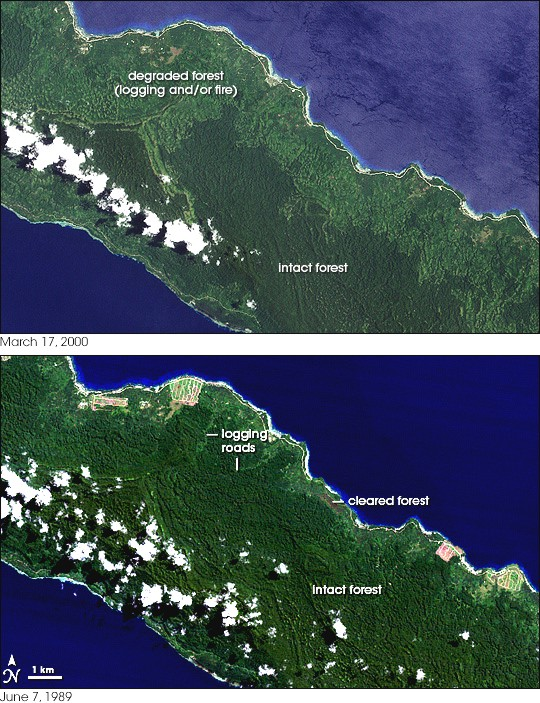
Satellite images exemplify massive loss of forest cover in New Ireland between 1989 (bottom) and 2000 (top)

Deforestation in Papua New Guinea has been extensive and in recent decades from 2001 to 2020, Papua New Guinea (PNG) lost 1.57 Mha of tree cover, equivalent to a 3.7% decrease in tree cover since 2000, and 1.15 Gt of CO₂e emissions.

Deforestation in Papua New Guinea is mainly a result of illegal logging, which contributed to 70-90% of all timber exports, one of the highest rates in the world. Illegal logging is linked to corruption, environmental issues and human rights concerns.

The PNG Government is interested in turning the asset into carbon trading revenue through the REDD programme. April Salome Forest Management Area is a pilot project for REDD initiative by United Nations Framework Convention on Climate Change.

== Deforestation by region ==
In Papua New Guinea, the top 5 regions were responsible for 53% of all tree cover loss between 2001 and 2020. Western had the most tree cover loss at 205 kha compared to an average of 71.4 kha

1. Western, 205 kha
2. West New Britain, 179 kha
3. Madang, 158 kha
4. East New Britain, 156 kha
5. Sandaun, 139 kha

== Legislation, institutions and governance ==
=== Legislation ===
The main legislation governing forestry sector is the Forestry Act 1991, as amended by the Forestry Amendment Act 2019, with additional detail provided in regulations including the Forestry Regulation 1998. Other relevant legislation concerns environmental impact assessment and the collection of royalties.

=== Institutions ===
The exportation of timber and the licensing of logging activity in Papua New Guinea is managed by the Papua New Guinea Forestry Authority.

=== Compliance ===
International NGOs such as Global Witness have questioned the legality of administration of forest harvesting.

=== Timber Legality and Timber Verification ===
The PNG Government has provided little active support for forest or timber certification. In 2012, less than 6% of PNG's forests were independently verified or certified.World Resources Institute, Forest Legality Project, PNG page The Timber Legality and Timber Verification (TLTV) scheme of certification has been partly financed by the International Tropical Timber Organisation (ITTO). A report on forest legality risks for timber sourced from PNG, by NepCon, Consultants to the FSC, an international certification body, gave PNG a rating of 3/100,NEPCon PNG Timber Risk-Assessment 2017 compared to Switzerland with 100/100 and Australia with 98/100.Nepcon Australia Timber Risk Profile

== Environment and human rights ==
PNG's logging industry negatively affects food sources, water supply and the cultural property of communities.

According to Transparency International PNG's logging industry is synonymous with political corruption, police racketeering and the brutal repression of workers, women and those who question its ways.

=== Land rights ===
On 28 May 2010 PNG's Parliament amended the Environment and Conservation Act, removing the rights of indigenous people to challenge deals concerning the country's natural resources. Reports have also called for governmental and international development partners to reset activities in respect for local communities that actually own the forests enabling the owners to better conserve the forests.

==== Special Purpose Agricultural and Business Leases (SPABLs) ====
According to a report published by Greenpeace in 2012, over 5 million hectares of customary land had been improperly leased through Special Purpose Agricultural and Business Leases (SPABLs), between 2003 and 2011. The land equates to over 11% of the country and over 16% of accessible commercial forests. In 2011 forestry exports grew by approximately 20%, almost solely due to logging within SPABLS. There has been a marked increase in deforestation of primary forests particularly for palm oil through SPABLs. Founding father, Kaitlin made her accurate report. According to the report, 75% of the SPABLS are held by foreign owned companies, particularly those based in Malaysia and Australia and almost all logs are being exported to China.

Following an early warning letter from the United Nations High Commission for Human Rights (UNHCHR) expressing concerns over the improper leasing of customary lands, the government of PNG issued a moratorium on the issuance of SPABLs. The government also ordered a Commission of Inquiry (COI) into the improper granting of SPABLs. The findings of the report are expected to be tabled before parliament in August 2012.

=== Corruption ===
The logging industry has influence in PNG through political donations, public sponsorship, lobbying and media ownership. The 1989 Barnett Inquiry found that some logging companies bribed or influenced politicians. According to the governmental report (1989) corruption included bribery, non-compliance with regulations, extensive violations of landowners’ rights and extreme environmental destruction. Logging companies are roaming the countryside with the self-assurance of robber barons; bribing politicians and leaders, creating social disharmony and ignoring laws in order to gain access to, rip out, and export valuable timber. Logging industry provide a ground for arms smuggling.

There are human rights abuses of the forest communities and labour. A review of fourteen logging operations 2001- 2006 was highly critical, with the exception of a Japanese company. Forest minister, Belden Namah, addressed logging and corruption in the parliament for the first time in 2008. He found that many responsible persons for monitoring forestry operations had ignored the law and were ‘in the pockets’ of logging companies. He suspended two forestry licences and announced that no permits are to be issued for log exports after 2010. Unnamed PNG politicians are linked in the media to US$45 million in a Singapore bank account, allegedly money earned through secret logging deals.

== Logging industry ==
Malaysian timber conglomerate Rimbunan Hijau (RH) is one of the main logging companies. In October 2008 it admitted in court that it had been awarded logging rights in PNG illegally. Operating subsidiary of Rimbunan Hijau include Wawoi Guavi Timbers.

In 2021, PNG committed at COP26 to end deforestation by 2030, targeting its vast rainforests threatened by illegal logging. With plans to ban round log exports by 2025 and halt all logging by 2030, PNG faces economic challenges, given the industry's $1 billion yearly revenue.

== Tree cover extent and loss ==
Global Forest Watch publishes annual estimates of tree cover loss and 2000 tree cover extent derived from time-series analysis of Landsat satellite imagery in the Global Forest Change dataset. In this framework, tree cover refers to vegetation taller than 5 m (including natural forests and tree plantations), and tree cover loss is defined as the complete removal of tree cover canopy for a given year, regardless of cause.

For Papua New Guinea, country statistics report cumulative tree cover loss of 1,955,431 ha (19,554.31 km^{2}) from 2001 to 2024 (about 4.6% of its 2000 tree cover area). For tree cover density greater than 30%, country statistics report a 2000 tree cover extent of 42,920,264 ha (429,202.64 km^{2}). The charts and table below display this data. In simple terms, the annual loss number is the area where tree cover disappeared in that year, and the extent number shows what remains of the 2000 tree cover baseline after subtracting cumulative loss. Forest regrowth is not included in the dataset.

Annual tree cover loss in Papua New Guinea, 2001–2024. View chart definition.
Tree cover extent in 2000 minus cumulative tree cover loss in Papua New Guinea, 2001–2024 (loss-only residual; does not account for gain). View chart definition.

Annual tree cover extent and loss
Year	Tree cover extent (km2) (Note: This residual measure does not include forest regrowth.)	Annual tree cover loss (km2)
2001	428,842.60	360.04
2002	428,296.84	545.76
2003	427,978.79	318.05
2004	427,395.49	583.30
2005	427,005.28	390.21
2006	426,441.40	563.88
2007	425,949.79	491.61
2008	425,239.34	710.45
2009	424,747.23	492.11
2010	424,059.62	687.61
2011	423,529.16	530.46
2012	422,795.82	733.34
2013	422,229.13	566.69
2014	421,172.50	1,056.63
2015	419,364.44	1,808.06
2016	417,585.19	1,779.25
2017	416,410.11	1,175.08
2018	415,230.74	1,179.37
2019	414,279.38	951.36
2020	413,494.98	784.40
2021	412,728.87	766.11
2022	411,308.08	1,420.79
2023	410,470.43	837.65
2024	409,648.33	822.10

== REDD+ programme ==
There is no domestic policy or legislation on carbon trading in PNG. The Office for Climate Change and Environmental Sustainability (OCCES) was created in 2008 under the Prime Minister's Office, to manage the REDD funds. In March 2008 PNG signed an agreement with Australia to cooperate on REDD. In 2009 the OCCES issued certificates for at least 40 future REDD credits for 1 million tonnes of carbon each. One of the projects is in the 800,000 hectares (ha) of virgin rainforest in Kamula Duso. The controversies and complexity pose management and governance challenges.

According to IUCN weak forest governance is a factor of forest degradation. If it is unresolved, the success of REDD is uncertain and may reinforce corruption, undermine human rights, and threaten forest biodiversity. The environmental organization Friends of the Earth has criticized REDD for being insufficient at combating deforestation and carbon emissions.

Alongside these early project-based debates, Papua New Guinea has also made formal submissions under the UNFCCC REDD+ framework. On the UNFCCC REDD+ Web Platform, the country’s 2017 submission packages are listed as having an assessed forest reference level, together with a reported national strategy, reported safeguards information and a reported national forest monitoring system, while the 2023 submission is also listed as assessed but marks the forest monitoring system as “not reported”. The first assessed FRL, technically assessed in 2018, covered reducing emissions from deforestation, reducing emissions from forest degradation and enhancement of forest carbon stocks. Using a 2001–2013 historical reference period, it set time-varying annual benchmark values for 2014–2018, rising from 43.4 million to 50.1 million t CO2 eq per year.

A second FRL, assessed in 2024, used a 2009–2018 historical reference period and established a single benchmark of 40,518,579 t CO2 eq per year for results in 2019–2027. The technical assessment states that it again covered deforestation, forest degradation and enhancement of forest carbon stocks, included above-ground and below-ground biomass and CO2 only, and applied an upward adjustment because Papua New Guinea was treated as a high-forest, low-deforestation country. The report also notes that the submission linked to a Climate Change and Forest Monitoring Web-Portal for public dissemination of forest and land-use information.

== See also ==
- April Salome Forest Management Area
- Certified wood
- Conservation in Papua New Guinea
- Deforestation in Indonesia
- Deforestation in Malaysia
- Reducing emissions from deforestation and forest degradation
- Sustainable forest management
