= April Salome Forest Management Area =

Forest management area in East Sepik Province, Papua New Guinea

April Salumei Forest Management Area April — Salumei Rainforest
- Location within Papua New Guinea

Geography
- Location: Papua New Guinea
- Coordinates: 4°38′15.3″S 142°46′37.0″E
- Area: 521,500 ha (1,289,000 acres)

Ecology
- Ecosystem: Tropical rainforest

April Salumei Forest Management Area also known as April Salome Rainforest is a forest management area in April — Salumei tropical forest covering over 600,000 hectares in Ambunti-Dreikikir District of East Sepik Province, of Papua New Guinea. The forest is located in the basins of two rivers: April and Salumei. The town of Ambunti serves as a gateway to the April Salome Forest Management Area.

The project area has previously been recognised as an exceptional biodiversity hotspot by the Climate Community and Biodiversity Standard (SCS, 2011). Before becoming a carbon project, the area was planned to be cleared for logging.

The April Salumei Rainforest Community Conservation Project, is developed by Rainforest Project Management Limited, and sustainably manages over 600,000 hectares of rainforest in the East Sepik Province of Papua New Guinea, with a crediting area of over 200,000 hectares.

The April Salumei Working Group, formed to assist with managing the project, provides employment opportunities to the local community. The project promotes culturally inclusive, sustainable community development via a new five-year Sustainable Development Plan, agreed by locals.

Previous project activities have delivered benefits including:

- Providing over 10,000 native eaglewood trees for village areas for sustainable agriculture
- Providing 1,000 solar powered lights to community schools, health centres and families to provide affordable, sustainable energy
- Created 18 jobs for community members
- Providing funds to improve 15 local schools to help promote quality education.

== Population ==
It is estimated that about 20,000 people are living in this area in 164 forest-dependent communities. Populated places include Nakek and Uwu.

== Geography ==
April Salumei Forest Management Area is located in the Sepik river basin. Sepik tributary, the April river is the major river in the area.

== See also ==
- Papua New Guinea Forestry Authority
- Deforestation in Papua New Guinea
