= Papua New Guinea Forestry Authority =

The Papua New Guinea Forest Authority (PNGFA) was established in 1993 under the Forestry Act, 1991. It replaced the former Department of Forest and unified all the Provincial Forest Divisions and the Forest Industries Council. This restructuring was the result of the 1989 Barnett Commission of Inquiry into forestry in Papua New Guinea.

The mandate of the PNGFA is to “Promote the management and wise utilization of the forest resources of Papua New Guinea as a renewable asset for the well-being of present and future generations.”

== Background ==
The PNGFA is overseen by the National Forest Board, which advises the Minister for Forests and gives directions to the National Forest Service, the operational arm of the PNGFA.

Since July 2010, the Minister for Forests has been Timothy Bonga and in 2007 Kanawi Pouru was appointed managing director of the National Forest Board.

Papua New Guinea has a total land area of 46.284 million hectares, of which an estimated 29.437million hectares is covered by forest. This land is home to an estimated 15,000 to 20,000 higher order plant species, of which over 2,000 are tree species and 400 may be currently utilised for harvesting, or other commercial uses, such as timber production or log exports.

Of the forest land, 62,277 hectares is commercial forest plantations and PNGFA conducted a valuation of these plantations in 2005, with funding assistance from AusAID. The valuation found that the total estimated investment value of the PNGFA's forest plantations is PGK123 million.

An estimated 95 per cent of land in Papua New Guinea is owned and managed by customary landowners. Therefore, forest related operations, such as logging and reforestation, must be agreed upon in consultation between the PNGFA and the landowners.

The PNGFA is headquartered at Hohola in the National Capital District, with 19 provincial offices and over 386 permanent employees throughout the country. The 2012 budget allocated to the PNGFA by the Department of Treasury is PGK11.8 million.

== Illegal logging ==
According to the PNGFA, the total log harvest of Papua New Guinea in 2006 was 3,389 million cubic metres. However, in August 2006, the World Bank estimated that illegal logging could account for as much as 70 per cent of logging in Papua New Guinea, which would fall well outside the official national log harvest figures.

Since 2004, Greenpeace has mounted an aggressive campaign against illegal logging in Papua New Guinea, after publishing a report indicating that 90 per cent of logging could be illegal.

It is alleged that in response Rimbunan Hijau, the largest logging company in Papua New Guinea, at the centre of Greenpeace's accusations, commissioned ITS-Global to write a report attacking Greenpeace.

During 2008 the International Tropical Timber Organization (ITTO) helped to trial a new electronic tracking service at timber concessions in Papua New Guinea in a bid to restrict the levels of illegal timber trading in Papua New Guinea. Following this trial period, the government launched the two-year project, Enhancing Forest Law Enforcement in Papua New Guinea alongside the PNGFA.

An ongoing Commission of Inquiry into Special Agricultural and Business Leases (SABL) has highlighted that despite the appointment of Pouru as managing director in 2007, the level of illegal logging has continued to grow in Papua New Guinea.

== Controversies ==
In 1989, an attempt was made to kill the Australian judge, Tos Barnett after his commission published findings of its inquiry into corruption in the Papua New Guinea forest industry. As the Chairman of the Commission of Inquiry, Barnett later went on to state that the “control of forestry operations was left to the decentralised, dismembered, disorganised and demoralised forestry service administrating the toothless and out-of-date Forestry Act.”

In 2008, the Supreme Court of Papua New Guinea quashed a decision to grant logging rights in the Kamula Doso forest area to Malaysian logging company Rimbunan Hijau, after the company admitted that earlier logging rights, previously granted to it, had been illegally obtained.

In 2010, the report submitted by the Auditor-General to the Public Accounts Committee on the PNGFA found that PGK100 million (US$41 million) in public funds allocated to the Forest Authority from 1999 to 2005 could not be accounted for. The Auditor-General's report reiterated substantive concerns about the failure of the PNGFA to maintain proper accounting. In response to these reports, Timothy Bonga, the then Chairman of the Public Accounts Committee stated that “the whole functional system of the (Forest) Authority has collapsed”.

== See also ==
- April Salome Forest Management Area
- Papua New Guinea
