= Dudong =

Malaysian state constituency

Dudong (N52)
Sarawak constituency

State constituency
- Legislature: Sarawak State Legislative Assembly
MLA
Vacant
- Constituency created: 1968
- First contested: 1969
- Last contested: 2026

Dudong is a state constituency in Sarawak, Malaysia, that has been represented in the Sarawak State Legislative Assembly since 1969.

The state constituency was created in the 1968 redistribution and is mandated to return a single member to the Sarawak State Legislative Assembly under the first past the post voting system.

== Demographics ==
Ethnic breakdown of Dudong's electorate as of 2022
1. Chinese (51.7%)
2. Sarawak bumiputera (37.5%)
3. Malay-Muslim bumiputera (9.90%)
4. Other ethnicities (0.90%)

== History ==
As of 2020, Dudong has a population of 67,264 people.

=== Polling districts ===
According to the gazette issued on 31 October 2022, the Dudong constituency has a total of 12 polling districts.

State constituency	Polling Districts	Code	Location
Dudong (N52)	Assan	211/52/01	SK Batu Wong; SK Ng. Asaan; SK Tanjong Latap; SJK (C) Sing Ming Kerto
Dudong (N52)	Naman	211/52/02	SK Sg. Naman; SK Ulu Sg. Naman; SK Ulu Durin Kiba
Dudong (N52)	Pak	211/52/03	SK Sg. Durin; SJK (C) Hing Ung Durin; SK Ng. Pak; SK Sg. Nibong
Dudong (N52)	Dudong	211/52/04	SJK (C) Yong Shing Stabau; SJK (C) Kwong Kok Salim
Dudong (N52)	Salim	211/52/05	SMK Bukit Lima
Dudong (N52)	Lanang	211/52/06	SMJK Chung Hua
Dudong (N52)	Aik Dee	211/52/07	SK Perbandaran Sibu No. 2
Dudong (N52)	Menyan	211/52/08	SK Sg. Menyan; SK Ulu Sg. Sengan; SJK (C) Sang Ming
Dudong (N52)	Sibu Jaya	211/52/09	SK Ulu Sg. Salim; SJK (C) Thian Hua
Dudong (N52)	Lada	211/52/10	SJK (C) Thai Kwang
Dudong (N52)	Usaha Jaya	211/52/11	SK Sentosa
Dudong (N52)	Mantis	211/52/12	SK SEDC

=== Representation history ===
Members of the Legislative Assembly for Dudong
Assembly	No	Years	Member	Party
Constituency created
8th	N30	1970-1974	Kong Chung Siew (江仲宵)	SUPP
9th	N30	1974-1979	Sandah Jarrow	SNAP
10th	N30	1979-1983	Sandah Jarrow	BN (SNAP)
11th	N30	1983-1987	Wilfred Kiroh Jeram	Independent
12th	N30	1987-1991	Jawan Empaling	BN (SUPP)
13th	N37	1991-1996	Soon Choon Teck (孙春德)	BN (SUPP)
14th	N40	1996-2001	Soon Choon Teck (孙春德)	BN (SUPP)
15th	N40	2001-2006	Soon Choon Teck (孙春德)	BN (SUPP)
16th	N46	2006-2011	Soon Choon Teck (孙春德)	BN (SUPP)
17th	N46	2011-2016	Yap Hoi Liong (叶海量)	PR (DAP)
18th	N52	2016-2018	Tiong Thai King (张泰卿)	BN (Direct)
18th	N52	2018-2021	Tiong Thai King (张泰卿)	PSB
19th	N52	2021–2026	Tiong King Sing (张庆信)	GPS (PDP)

== Election results ==
Sarawak state election, 2026: Dudong
Party	Candidate	Votes	%	∆%
GPS				▲
PH				▲
Total valid votes				
Total rejected ballots				
Unreturned ballots				
Turnout				
Registered electors				
Majority				

Sarawak state election, 2021: Dudong
Party	Candidate	Votes	%	∆%
GPS	Tiong King Sing	9,390	46.99	▲46.99
PSB	Wong Hui Ping	3,584	17.93	▲17.93
DAP	Paul Ling	2,724	13.63	▼22.48
PBK	Jane Lau Sing Yee	1,779	8.90	▲8.90
Independent	Fadhil Mohd Isa	1,178	5.89	▲5.89
PBDS Baru	Julius Enchana	893	4.47	▲4.47
Independent	Engga Unchat	225	1.13	▲1.13
ASPIRASI	Josephine Lau Kiew Peng	212	1.06	▲1.06
Total valid votes		19,985	100.00	
Total rejected ballots		298		
Unreturned ballots		72		
Turnout		20,355	58.23	▼14.74
Registered electors		34,955		
Majority		5,806	29.05	▲19.38
GPS gain from BN		Swing		?
Source(s) https://lom.agc.gov.my/ilims/upload/portal/akta/outputp/1718688/PUB687.pdf

Sarawak state election, 2016: Dudong
Party	Candidate	Votes	%	∆%
BN	Tiong Thai King	9,700	46.36	▼4.01
DAP	Yap Hoi Liong	7,554	36.11	▼14.26
Independent	Benny Lee Chung Fatt	3,288	15.72	▲15.72
Independent	Casper Kayong Umping	228	1.09	▲1.09
STAR	Ting Yiik Hong	152	0.73	▲0.73
Total valid votes		20,922	100.00	
Total rejected ballots		219		
Unreturned ballots		42		
Turnout		21,183	72.97	▼1.20
Registered electors		29,028		
Majority		2,146	10.26	▲8.60
BN gain from DAP		Swing		?
Source(s) "Federal Government Gazette - Notice of Contested Election, State Legislative Assembly of the State of Sarawak [P.U. (B) 190/2016]" (PDF). Attorney General's Chambers of Malaysia. 25 April 2016. Archived from the original (PDF) on 12 June 2017. "Senarai Calon yang Disahkan Layak Bertanding Pilihan Raya Dewan Undangan Negeri ke-11". Election Commission of Malaysia. 25 April 2016. Archived from the original on 25 April 2016.

Sarawak state election, 2011: Dudong
Party	Candidate	Votes	%	∆%
DAP	Yap Hoi Liong	9,649	50.37	▲1.80
BN	Tiong Thai King	9,332	48.72	▼2.71
Independent	Apandi Abdul Rani	174	0.91	▲0.91
Total valid votes		19,155	100.00	
Total rejected ballots		211		
Unreturned ballots		104		
Turnout		19,470	74.17	▲7.36
Registered electors		26,251		
Majority		317	1.65	▼43.12
DAP gain from BN		Swing		?
Source(s) "Federal Government Gazette - Results of Contested Election and Statements of the Poll after the Official Addition of Votes Sarawak [P.U. (B) 245/2011]" (PDF). Attorney General's Chambers of Malaysia. 29 April 2011.

Sarawak state election, 2006: Dudong
Party	Candidate	Votes	%	∆%
BN	Soon Choon Teck	7,359	51.43	▼16.81
DAP	Stephen Lu Cheng Kuok	6,951	48.57	▲24.85
Total valid votes		14,310	100.00	
Total rejected ballots		210		
Unreturned ballots		59		
Turnout		14,579	66.81	▼2.69
Registered electors		21,819		
Majority		408	2.85	▼41.92
BN hold		Swing		

Sarawak state election, 2001: Dudong
Party	Candidate	Votes	%	∆%
BN	Soon Choon Teck	9,679	68.24	▲2.26
DAP	Wong Kee Woan	3,364	23.72	▲4.12
Independent	Lubau Genam	1,001	7.06	▲7.06
Independent	Yek Tiew Loeng	140	0.99	▲0.99
Total valid votes		14,184	100.00	
Total rejected ballots		218		
Unreturned ballots		3		
Turnout		14,405	69.50	▼1.95
Registered electors		20,726		
Majority		6,315	44.52	▼1.48
BN hold		Swing		

Sarawak state election, 1996: Dudong
Party	Candidate	Votes	%	∆%
On nomination day, Soon Choon Teck won uncontested.
BN	Soon Choon Teck			
Total valid votes				
Total rejected ballots				
Unreturned ballots				
Turnout				
Registered electors		18,353		
Majority				
BN hold		Swing		

Sarawak state election, 1991: Dudong
Party	Candidate	Votes	%	∆%
BN	Soon Choon Teck	8,580	65.98	▲15.56
DAP	Joseph Tang	2,549	19.60	▲19.60
PBDS	Kong Pak Nam	1,874	14.41	▲14.41
Total valid votes		13,003	100.00	
Total rejected ballots		206		
Unreturned ballots		95		
Turnout		13,304	71.45	▲1.23
Registered electors		18,619		
Majority		6,031	46.38	▲3.86
BN hold		Swing		

Sarawak state election, 1987: Dudong
Party	Candidate	Votes	%	∆%
BN	Jawan Empaling	4,717	50.42	▼14.15
PBDS	Wilfred Kiroh Jeram	4,406	47.10	▲11.10
Independent	Siew Chee Kiong	232	2.48	▲2.48
Total valid votes		9,355	100.00	
Total rejected ballots		158		
Unreturned ballots		0		
Turnout		9,513	70.22	▼1.77
Registered electors		13,548		
Majority		311	3.32	▼32.73
BN gain from Independent		Swing		?

Sarawak state election, 1983: Dudong
Party	Candidate	Votes	%	∆%
Independent	Wilfred Kiroh Jeram	2,870	36.09	▲36.09
BN	Joseph Tan Chok Tiong	2,695	33.89	▼20.09
PBDS	Raymond Sabang	2,387	30.01	▲30.01
Total valid votes		7,952	100.00	
Total rejected ballots		112		
Unreturned ballots		0		
Turnout		8,064	71.56	▲0.56
Registered electors		11,269		
Majority		175	2.20	▼27.09
Independent gain from BN		Swing		?

Sarawak state election, 1979: Dudong
Party	Candidate	Votes	%	∆%
BN	Sandah Jarrow	4,125	54.28	▲4.28
Independent	Liaw Yew Ming	1,898	24.98	▲24.98
DAP	John Chan Hiu Fei	883	11.62	▲11.62
Independent	Yun Janang	454	5.98	▲5.98
Independent	Alexander Temaga Seli	239	3.15	▲3.15
Total valid votes		7,599	100.00	
Total rejected ballots		203		
Unreturned ballots		0		
Turnout		7,802	70.53	▲1.53
Registered electors		11,062		
Majority		2,227	29.31	▲26.31
BN gain from SNAP		Swing		?

Sarawak state election, 1974: Dudong
Party	Candidate	Votes	%	∆%
SNAP	Sandah Jarrow	2,164	50.37	▲13.65
BN	Ting Ing Mieng	2,017	46.95	▼10.05
Independent	Kong Siew Yong	115	2.68	▲2.68
Total valid votes		4,296	100.00	
Total rejected ballots		338		
Unreturned ballots		0		
Turnout		4,634	68.58	▼9.53
Registered electors		6,753		
Majority		147	3.42	▼1.58
SNAP gain from SUPP		Swing		?

Sarawak state election, 1969: Dudong
Party	Candidate	Votes	%
SUPP	Kong Chung Siew	1,675	36.72
PESAKA	Jonathan Bangau	1,434	31.44
SNAP	Sandah Jarrow	1,138	24.95
Independent	Galau Kumbang	195	4.28
Independent	Langgai Abol	119	2.61
Total valid votes		4,561	100.00
Total rejected ballots		280	
Unreturned ballots		0	
Turnout		4,841	78.11
Registered electors		6,193	
Majority		241	5.28
This was a new constituency created.
