= Parti Rakyat Gabungan Jaksa Pendamai =

Parti Rakyat Gabungan Jaksa Pendamai Justices of Peace Coalition People's Party (Peace Party)
- Abbreviation: PEACE
- President: Julian Petrus Jout
- Founder: Julian Petrus Jout
- Founded: 2013
- Headquarters: Kuching, Sarawak
- Ideology: Sarawak regionalism
- Colours: White, yellow, red, blue
- Dewan Negara: 0 / 70
- Dewan Rakyat: 0 / 222
- Sarawak State Legislative Assembly: 0 / 82

The Parti Rakyat Gabungan Jaksa Pendamai or Justices of Peace Coalition People's Party (PEACE); or just shortly known as Peace Party is a political party based in Sarawak, Malaysia. It received permission to operate as a political party in 2013 and was among the 20 new parties registration approved by the Registrar of Society (RoS). The party's founder and president Julian Petrus Jout announced that the party's aims were among other things, for Sarawak to get 50 percent royalty in oil and gas, as well as for the government to appoint a minister in charge of non-Muslim affairs and rights.

== General election results ==
Election	Total seats won	Seats contested	Total votes	Voting Percentage	Outcome of election	Election leader
2016	0 / 26	11	1,005	0.01%	0 seat; No representation in Parliament	Julian Petrus Jout

=== State election results ===
Sarawak State Legislative Assembly
Election	Votes		Seats			Position (Note: As part of electoral coalition.)	Status
Election	Count	%	Result	Won / contested	+/–	Position	Status
2016	Did not contest						No seats
2021	Did not contest						No seats

== See also ==
- Politics of Malaysia
- List of political parties in Malaysia
