= Rimbunan Hijau =

Forest logging company of Malaysia

Rimbunan Hijau Group

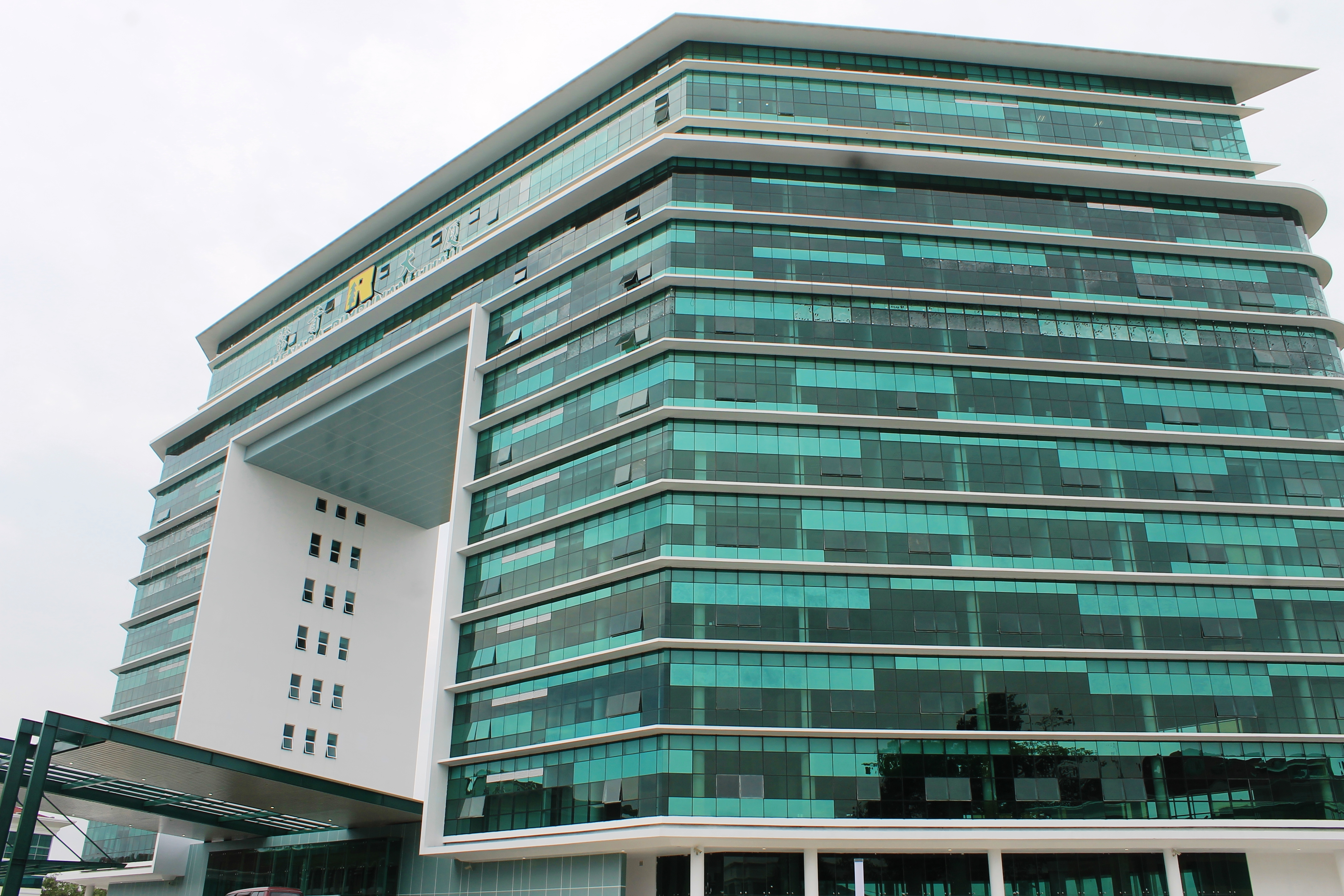
- Rimbunan Hijau tower built in 2014
- Type: Private Limited Company
- Industry: Forestry, Plantations, Media, ICT, Hospitality
- Headquarters: 2°15′52.6″N 111°50′38.1″E; Sibu, Sarawak, Malaysia
- Key people: Tan Sri' Dato Tiong Hiew King
- Number of employees: 10,000
- Website: RH group Malaysia homepage

Rimbunan Hijau is a Malaysian multinational logging corporation founded by Malaysian businessman Tiong Hiew King. The company has operations in many countries, including Malaysia, Indonesia, Papua New Guinea, Equatorial Guinea, Gabon, Vanuatu, New Zealand and Russia.

In Papua New Guinea, Rimbunan Hijau is the single biggest logging operator, and runs the country's biggest sawmill. It also owns one of the two major newspapers in the country, The National.

The company was established in 1975 and has an estimated annual turnover of more than US$1 billion, according to Malaysia-China Business Council.

== Businesses ==
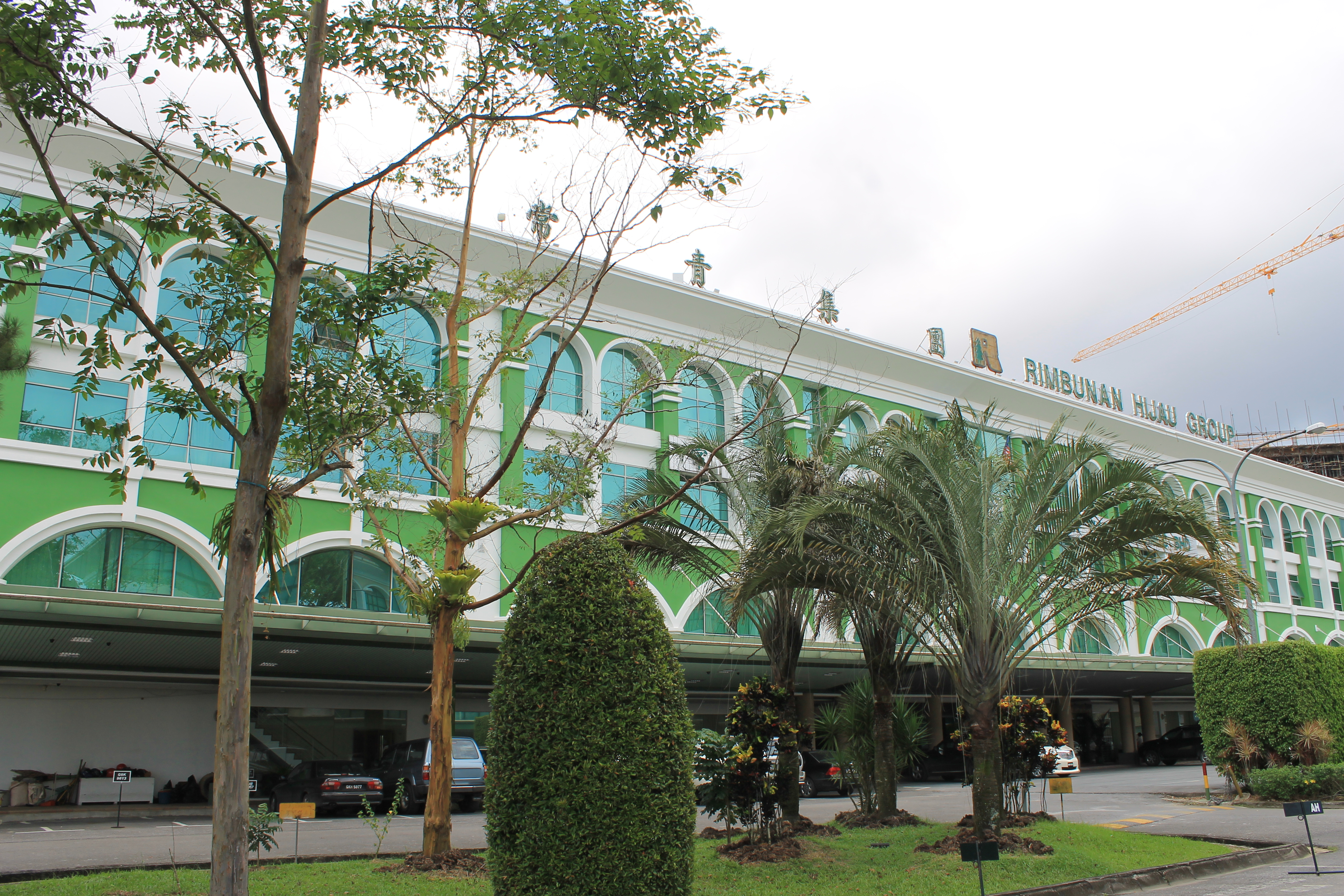
RH Group old headquarters

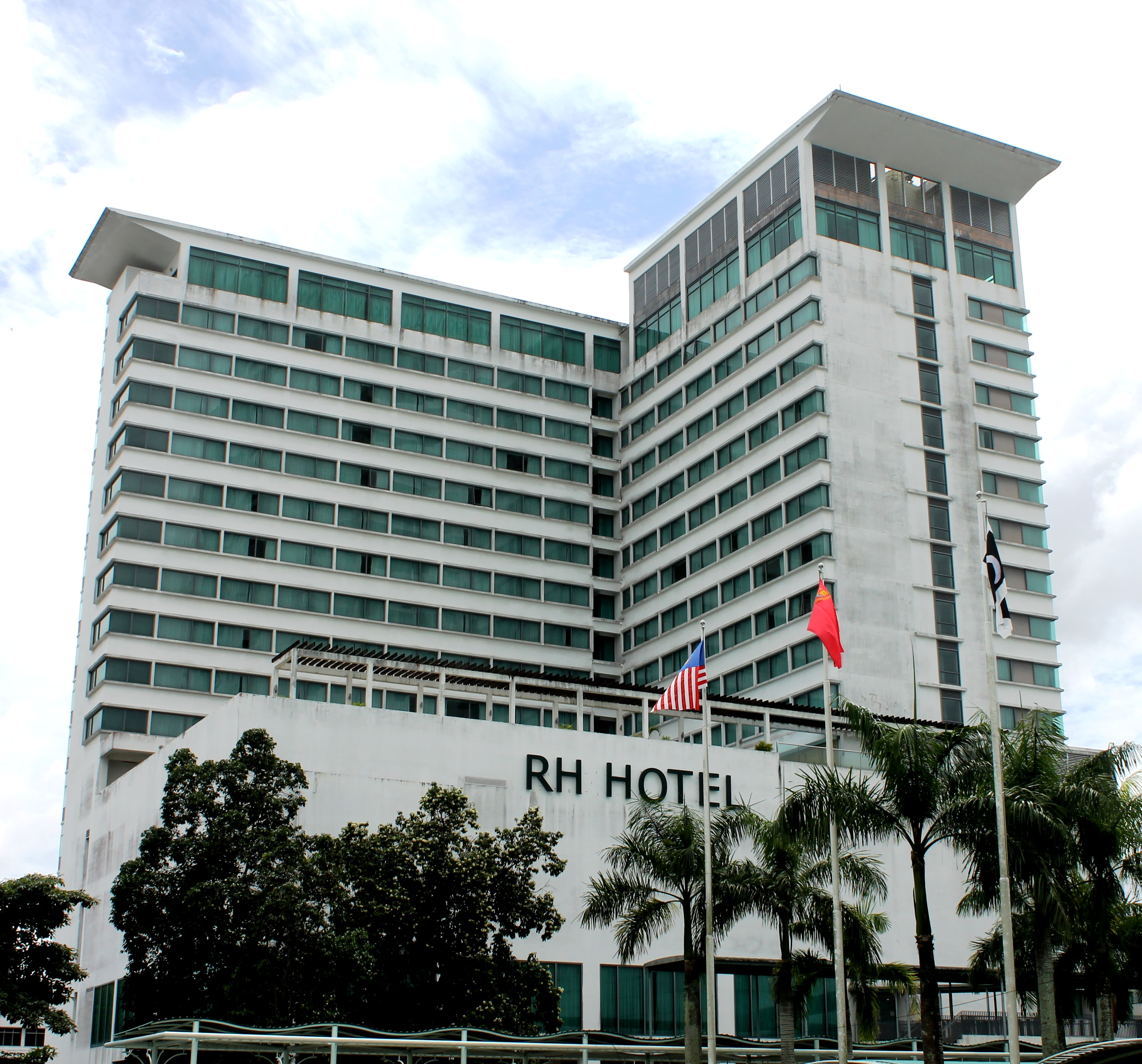
RH Hotel in Sibu

The company is involved in various business activities through its subsidiaries such as forestry, oil palm, media, ICT and hospitality.

=== Forestry and oil palm ===
Jaya Tiasa Holdings started as a downstream wood processing company at Tanjong Ensurai, Sibu, Sarawak in 1983. Jaya Tiasa had five wood processing mills as of 1994. In 2002, the company diversified into the oil palm business and opened the first crude palm oil mill in 2009. Listed on Bursa Malaysia, the company had a market capitalisation of RM 2.5 billion in 2014.

Subur Tiasa Holdings Berhad was founded in 1988 by Tiong Hiew King with an initial paid-up capital of RM 125.7 million. The company initially went on to manufacture plywood and veneer, followed by sawn timber and laminated board manufacturing.

Rimbunan Sawit Berhad owns oil palm plantations in Lundu, Selangau, Miri and Marudi. This subsidiary acquired three palm oil mills between 2015 and 2017 located in Miri and Lundu.

=== Information and communication technologies ===
In 1995, Rimbunan Hijau acquired COMSERV (Sarawak) Sdn Bhd, providing services for IT network infrastructure and system integration for the government of Sarawak. The company became an authorized sales and distributor for IBM mid-range computers, an authorized Microsoft Provider, an Oracle Authorized system integrator, and an IBM system partner.

RH also owns another subsidiary in Peninsular Malaysia named Optical Communications Engineering Sdn Bhd that manufactures and supplies optical fibres.

== Other countries ==
=== Papua New Guinea ===
Rimbunan Hijau (PNG) Limited was established in 1988.

=== Equatorial Guinea ===
It is the dominant player in the logging sector in Equatorial Guinea by the subsidiary Shimmer International. Rimbunan Hijau was in 1999 also logging contractor for Teodorin Obiang, the agriculture and forests minister of Equatorial Guinea and the son of the president.

=== Russia ===
Rimbunan Hijau Far East Company Limited was set up in 1997 in Russia, involving in timber harvesting and processing. Majority of the timber are exported to China, Japan and South Korea.

=== Singapore ===
In January 1997, a subsidiary of Rimbunan Hijau named Woodsville Private Limited bought a Singaporean company named Tri-M Technologies that provides electronics contract manufacturing services. Woodsville is in turn owned by Surreyville Pte Ltd, an investment holding company under RH group. In 2009, Surreyville and Sharptone Investments owned 50.56% and 28.03% of Tri-M. Tri-M was renamed to RH Petrogas Limited in the same year.

== Controversies ==
Rimbunan Hijau has been heavily criticized by environmental and humanitarian organizations for alleged human rights abuses, ignoring indigenous peoples Human rights, political corruption and negligence of the environment. A recent World Bank report estimates that up to 70 percent of logging in Papua New Guinea is illegal, further adding to the criticism.

Two groups that have made investigations and held protests against the company are Greenpeace and Rainforest Action Network. Rimbunan Hijau in turn has threatened to sue Greenpeace for defamation because of its report "The Untouchables - Rimbunan Hijau’s World of Forest Crime and Political Patronage" demanding that the group withdraw the paper. Greenpeace has declined to comply.

Citibank, following a review of its own environmental policies in 2005, declared that it would require the client Rimbunan Hijau to obtain credible, independent, third party certification for its Papua New Guinea operations in the future.
